= Azure (Art Farmer and Fritz Pauer album) =

Studio album by Art Farmer and Fritz Pauer
- Released: 1987
- Recorded: June 25–26 & September 9–10, 1987
- Studio: Austrophon Studios, Vienna, Austria
- Genre: Jazz
- Length: 39:55
- Label: Soul Note; SN 1126
- Producer: Giovanni Bonandrini

Art Farmer chronology
Something to Live For: The Music of Billy Strayhorn (1987)	Azure (1987)	Blame It On My Youth (1988)

Azure is an album by American flugelhornist Art Farmer and Austrian pianist Fritz Pauer featuring performances recorded in 1987 and released on the Soul Note label.

== Reception ==
Professional ratings
Review scores
Source	Rating
Allmusic	3/5 stars
The Penguin Guide to Jazz Recordings	2.5/4 stars

The Allmusic review called the album "A peaceful and mostly introspective release".

== Track listing ==
1. "If You Could See Me Now" (Tadd Dameron, Carl Sigman) - 4:32
2. "Nighttime" (Fritz Pauer) - 3:58
3. "Yesterday's Thoughts" (Benny Golson) - 4:56
4. "Blue Windows" (Traditional) - 3:19
5. "Azure" (Duke Ellington, Irving Mills) - 4:15
6. "Sound Within an Empty Room" (Pauer) - 6:13
7. "Soul Eyes" (Mal Waldron) - 4:22
8. "Danielle" (Al Cohn) - 4:17
9. "Song of Praise" (Pauer) - 4:03

== Personnel ==
- Art Farmer - flugelhorn
- Fritz Pauer - piano
