= Julian Priester =

American jazz trombonist

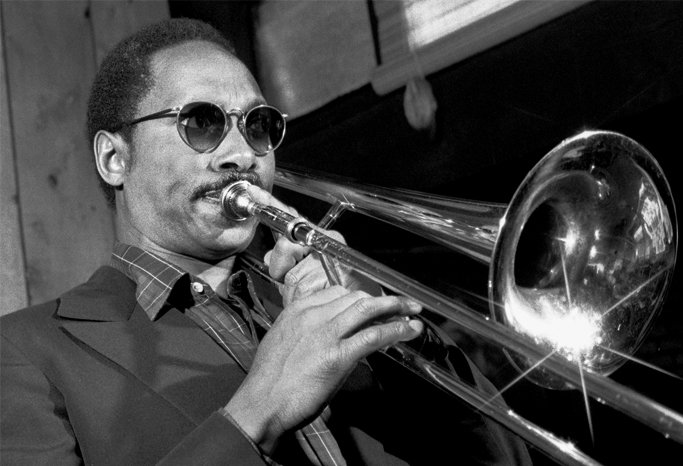
- Julian Priester in 1987

Background information
- Born: June 29, 1935 (age 91); Chicago, Illinois, U.S.
- Genres: Jazz, avant-garde jazz
- Occupations: Musician, composer
- Instruments: Trombone, euphonium
- Years active: 1950s–present
- Labels: ECM, Postcards, Blue Note

Julian Priester (born June 29, 1935) is an American jazz trombonist and occasional euphoniumist. He is sometimes credited as "Julian Priester Pepo Mtoto". He has played with Sun Ra, Max Roach, Duke Ellington, John Coltrane, and Herbie Hancock.

== Biography ==
He was born in Chicago, Illinois, United States. Priester attended Chicago's DuSable High School, where he studied under Walter Dyett. In his teens he played with blues and R&B artists such as Muddy Waters, and Bo Diddley, and had the opportunity to jam with jazz players such as the saxophonist Sonny Stitt.

In the early 1950s, Priester was a member of Sun Ra's big band, recording several albums with the group, before leaving Chicago in 1956 to tour with Lionel Hampton, and he then joined Dinah Washington in 1958. The following year he settled in New York and joined the group led by drummer Max Roach, who heard him playing on the Philly Joe Jones album, "Blues for Dracula" (1958). While playing in Roach's group, Priester also recorded two albums as a leader, Keep Swingin' and Spiritsville, both of which were recorded and released by Riverside (the latter by their Jazzland subsidiary) in 1960.

Priester recorded two albums with trumpeter Booker Little in 1961, Out Front and Booker Little and Friend (also known as Victory and Sorrow), the first also features Roach, and Priester took part in the sessions for John Coltrane's Africa/Brass album (on which he played euphonium), which was recorded in the same year. He left Roach's band during 1961, and between then and 1969 appeared as a sideman on albums led by Freddie Hubbard, Stanley Turrentine, Blue Mitchell, Art Blakey, Joe Henderson, McCoy Tyner, Johnny Griffin, and Sam Rivers. In 1969, he accepted an offer to play with Duke Ellington's big band, and he stayed with that ensemble for six months, before leaving in 1970 to join pianist Herbie Hancock's fusion sextet.

After leaving the Hancock band in 1973, Priester moved to San Francisco, where he recorded two more albums as a leader: Love, Love in 1974 and 1977's Polarization, both for the ECM label. In 1979 he joined the faculty of Cornish College of the Arts in Seattle, where he taught jazz composition, performance, and history until retiring in 2011.

In the 1980s, he became a member of the Dave Holland's quintet, and also returned to Sun Ra's band for a few recordings. The 1990s saw the addition of Charlie Haden's Liberation Music Orchestra to his schedule. Priester was co-leader with drummer Jimmy Bennington on 'Portraits and Silhouettes' which received an Honorable Mention in All About Jazz New York's 'Best Recordings of 2007', which culminated with the two musicians appearing at the 30th Annual Chicago Jazz Festival. Priester also performs on the album Monoliths & Dimensions, by the drone metal band Sunn 0))), released in May 2009. His major contributions were to the final track of the album, "Alice," a tribute to Alice Coltrane.

In addition to teaching and touring, Priester continues to record albums under his own name. He released Hints on Light and Shadow (with Sam Rivers and Tucker Martine) in 1997 and followed it in 2002 with In Deep End Dance.

As of the beginning of 2022, Julian hosted listening sessions early on Wednesday evenings in Seattle as a part of a Jazz Fellowship, at Vermillion Art Gallery and Bar.

== Discography ==
=== As leader or co-leader ===
- 1960: Keep Swingin' (Riverside)
- 1960: Spiritsville (Jazzland)
- 1973: Love, Love (ECM)
- 1977: Polarization (ECM)
- 1997: Hints on Light and Shadow with Sam Rivers (Postcards)
- 2002: In Deep End Dance (Conduit)
- 2007: Portraits and Silhouettes with Jimmy Bennington (That Swan)
- 2008: Formations with Marcus Wood
- 2010: Conversational Music with Aaron Alexander
- 2012: Blue Stride

Compilations

- 2001: Out of This World with Walter Benton (Milestone) - pairs Priester's Spiritsville with Benton's Out of This World

=== As sideman ===
With Jane Ira Bloom

- The Nearness (Arabesque, 1996)

With Anthony Braxton

- Composition No. 96 (Leo, 1981 [1989])

With Donald Byrd

- Fancy Free, (Blue Note, 1970)

With Jay Clayton

- Live at Jazz Alley (ITM, 1995)

With Jazz Artists Guild

- Newport Rebels (Candid, 1961)

With John Coltrane

- Africa/Brass, (Impulse!, 1961)

With Duke Ellington

- New Orleans Suite (Atlantic, 1971)
- The Intimate Ellington (Pablo, 1969–71 [1977])
- Up in Duke's Workshop (Pablo, 1969–72 [1979])

With Robben Ford

- Blues Connotation (ITM Pacific, 1996)
- City Life (West Wind, 2006)

With David Friesen, Eddie Moore, Jim Pepper, and Mal Waldron

- Remembering the Moment (Soul Note, 1987)

With Red Garland

- So Long Blues (Galaxy, 1979 [1984])
- Strike Up the Band (Galaxy, 1979 [1981])

With Jerry Granelli

- Koputai (ITM, 1990)
- One Day at a Time (ITM, 1990)
- A Song I Thought I Heard Buddy Sing (ITM, 1992)
- Another Place (Intuition, 1994)

With Johnny Griffin

- The Little Giant (Riverside, 1959)

With George Gruntz

- Theatre (ECM, 1983)

With Carolyn Graye

- Carolyn Graye (Pony Boy, 2005)

With Charlie Haden

- Helium Tears (By, 2006)

With Herbie Hancock

- Mwandishi (Warner Bros., 1970)
- Crossings (Warner Bros., 1972)
- Sextant (Columbia, 1973)
- V.S.O.P (Columbia, 1976 [1977])

With David Haney

- Caramel Topped Terrier (Cadence, 2001)

With Billy Harper

- Capra Black (Strata-East, 1973)

With Eddie Henderson

- Sunburst (Blue Note, 1975)
- Heritage (Blue Note, 1976)
- Comin' Through (Capitol, 1977)
- Mahal (Capitol, 1978)

With Andrew Hill

- Passing Ships (Blue Note, 1969)

With Dave Holland

- Jumpin' In (ECM, 1984)
- Seeds of Time (ECM, 1985)

With Wayne Horvitz

- 4+1 Ensemble (Intuition, 1996 [1998])
- From a Window (Avant, 2000)

With Freddie Hubbard

- Hub Cap (Blue Note, 1961)

With Bobbi Humphrey

- Fancy Dancer (Blue Note, 1975)

With Philly Joe Jones

- Blues for Dracula (Riverside, 1958)
- Showcase (Riverside, 1959)

With Clifford Jordan

- These are My Roots: Clifford Jordan Plays Leadbelly (Atlantic, 1965)
- Soul Fountain (Vortex, 1966 [1970])
- In the World (Strata-East, 1969 [1972])
- Masters from Different Worlds (Mapleshade, 1989 [1994]) with Ran Blake
- The Mellow Side of Clifford Jordan (Mapleshade, 1989-91 [1997])

With Eyvind Kang

- Visible Breath (Ideologic Organ, 2011)

With Azar Lawrence

- Bridge into the New Age (Prestige, 1974)

With Abbey Lincoln

- Abbey Is Blue (Riverside, 1959)
- Straight Ahead (Candid, 1961)

With Booker Little

- Out Front (Candid, 1961)
- Booker Little and Friend (Bethlehem, 1961)

With Herbie Mann

- Impressions of the Middle East (Atlantic, 1966)

With Pat Metheny

- Move to the Groove (Westwind, 2000)

With Blue Mitchell

- Smooth as the Wind (Riverside, 1961)
- Boss Horn (Blue Note, 1966)
- Heads Up! (Blue Note, 1968)

With Lee Morgan

- Sonic Boom (Blue Note, 1967)

With Duke Pearson

- Introducing Duke Pearson's Big Band (Blue Note, 1967)

With Buddy Rich

- Rich Versus Roach (Mercury, 1959)

With Sam Rivers

- Dimensions & Extensions (Blue Note, 1967)

With Max Roach

- The Many Sides of Max (Mercury, 1959 [1964])
- Quiet as It's Kept (Mercury, 1959)
- Moon Faced and Starry Eyed (Mercury, 1959)
- Long as You're Living (Enja, 1960 [1984])
- Parisian Sketches (Mercury, 1960)
- We Insist!, (Candid, 1960)
- Percussion Bitter Sweet (Impulse!, 1961)
- Max Roach and Friends Vol. 2 (Jazz View, 1961)
- It's Time (Impulse!, 1962)

With Paul Schutze

- Site Anubis (Big Cat, 1996)

With Lonnie Smith

- Turning Point (Blue Note, 1969)

With Sunn O)))

- Monoliths & Dimensions (Southern Lord, 2009)

With Sun Ra

- Super-Sonic Jazz (Saturn, 1956)
- Jazz by Sun Ra (Saturn, 1956)
- Sound of Joy (Delmark, 1956 [1968])
- Jazz in Silhouette (Saturn, 1959)
- Angels and Demons at Play (Saturn, 1956–1960 [1965])
- Lanquidity (Philly Jazz, 1978)
- Blue Delight (A&M, 1989)
- Purple Night (A&M, 1990)
- Somewhere Else (Rounder, 1993)
- Second Star to the Right: Salute to Walt Disney (Leo, 1995)

With Cal Tjader

- El Sonido Nuevo (Verve, 1967) with Eddie Palmieri

With Stanley Turrentine

- The Spoiler (Blue Note, 1966)
- A Bluish Bag (Blue Note, 1967)

With McCoy Tyner

- Tender Moments (Blue Note, 1967)

With Dinah Washington

- Dinah Washington Sings Fats Waller (Emarcy, 1957)
- Dinah Sings Bessie Smith (Emarcy, 1958) - reissued as The Bessie Smith Songbook (Mercury, 1986)

With Reggie Workman

- Summit Conference (Postcards, 1994)
- Cerebral Caverns (Postcards, 1995)
