= You Make Me Smile (album) =

Studio album by Art Farmer Quintet featuring Clifford Jordan
- Released: 1986
- Recorded: December 13 & 15, 1984; Classic Sound Studio, New York City
- Genre: Jazz
- Length: 36:34
- Label: Soul Note; SN 1076
- Producer: Giovanni Bonandrini

Art Farmer chronology
| In Concert (1984) | You Make Me Smile (1986) | Something to Live For: The Music of Billy Strayhorn (1987) |

Professional ratings
Review scores
| Source | Rating |
|---|---|
| Allmusic | 4/5 stars |

You Make Me Smile is an album by American flugelhornist Art Farmer's Quintet featuring saxophonist Clifford Jordan featuring performances recorded in 1984 and released on the Soul Note label.

== Reception ==
The Allmusic review called the album "Creative bop-based music with Farmer's usual subtlety clearly in evidence".

== Track listing ==
1. "You Make Me Smile" (Rufus Reid) - 4:19
2. "Prelude No. 1" (Alexander Scriabin) - 7:02
3. "Nostalgia" (Tadd Dameron, Fats Navarro) - 5:42
4. "Flashback" (Art Farmer) - 7:51
5. "Souvenir" (Benny Carter) - 6:52
6. "Have You Met Miss Jones?" (Lorenz Hart, Richard Rodgers) - 4:48

== Personnel ==
- Art Farmer - flugelhorn
- Clifford Jordan - tenor saxophone
- Fred Hersch - piano
- Rufus Reid - bass
- Akira Tana - drums
