= Todd Coolman =

American jazz musician

Todd Coolman (born July 14, 1954) is a jazz bassist and a retired tenured Professor of Music at the Jazz Studies Program in the Conservatory of Music at Purchase College in Westchester County, New York. He is currently the Artistic Director of the Skidmore Jazz Institute.

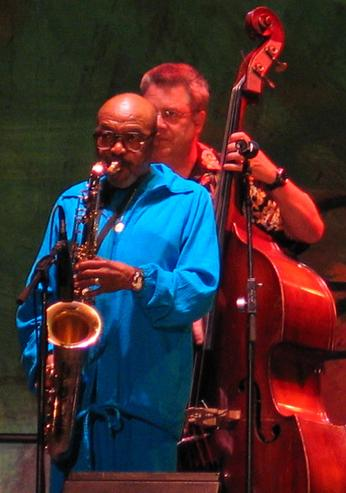
Coolman playing the bass behind James Moody

Coolman grew up in Gary, Indiana. In 1978 he moved to New York City. He has since then performed with Horace Silver, Gerry Mulligan, Art Farmer, Lionel Hampton, Benny Goodman, Slide Hampton, Stan Getz, Tommy Flanagan, and countless others. He is probably best known for his 26-year association with the James Moody Quartet. Coolman has recorded with numerous jazz musicians in many contexts and has also released four recordings under his own leadership: Tomorrows (1990), Lexicon (1995), Perfect Strangers (2008) and Collectables (2016). In 1999, Coolman won the Grammy Award for Best Album Notes for Miles Davis Quintet 1965-1968. In 2011 an album on which he played, James Moody's Moody 4B, won the Grammy Award for Best Jazz Instrumental Album, Individual or Group.

He has written two method books related to jazz bass playing: The Bass Tradition and The Bottom Line.

In 1997, Coolman received a Ph.D. in Music and the Performing Arts from New York University.

He lives in Denville, New Jersey.

== Discography ==
=== As leader ===
- Tomorrows (BRC, 1990)
- Lexicon (Double-Time, 1995)
- Perfect Strangers (ArtistShare, 2008)
- Collectables (Sunnyside, 2016)

=== As sideman ===
With Hal Galper Trio

- Invitation to a Concert (1990)
- Live at Port Townsend '91 (1991)

With James Moody

- Moving Forward (1988)
- Sweet and Lovely (1989)
- Young at Heart (1996)
- Moody Plays Mancini (1997)
- Homage (2004)
- Our Delight (2008)
- Moody 4A (2009)
- Moody 4B (2010)

With Rob Schneiderman

- Radio Waves (1991)
- Glass Enclosure (2008)

With Gerald Wilson

- Monterey Moods (2007)
- Detroit (2009)

With others

- Lionel Hampton, Made in Japan (1982)
- Bobby Watson, Advance (1984)
- Terry Gibbs, Chicago Fire (1987)
- John Campbell, After Hours (1988)
- Buddy DeFranco/Terry Gibbs, Holiday for Swing (1988)
- David "Fathead" Newman Quartet ans Clifford Jordan, Blue Head (Candid, 1990)
- Ahmad Jamal, Live in Paris '92 (1993)
- George Gershwin & Ira Gershwin, Sincerely, George & Ira Gershwin (1997) – compilation
- Buddy DeFranco, Gone with the Wind (1999)
- Michael Dease, Bonafide (2018)
