= The Electric Boogaloo Song =

Studio album by Cedar Walton
- Released: 1969
- Recorded: January 14, 1969; New York City
- Genre: Jazz
- Labels: Prestige; PR 7618
- Producer: Don Schlitten

Cedar Walton chronology
Spectrum (1968)	The Electric Boogaloo Song (1969)	Soul Cycle (1969)

The Electric Boogaloo Song is an album by pianist Cedar Walton, which was recorded in 1969 and released on the Prestige label.

== Reception ==
Professional ratings
Review scores
Source	Rating
AllMusic	4/5 stars
The Rolling Stone Jazz Record Guide	3/5 stars

AllMusic reviewed the album, stating: "The Electric Boogaloo Song (1969) continued the high standards of earlier successes like Cedar! and Spectrum, thanks to another strong batch of Walton-penned sides and excellent support musicians."

== Track listing ==
All compositions by Cedar Walton except as indicated

1. "The Electric Boogaloo Song" – 8:15
2. "You Stepped out of a Dream" (Nacio Herb Brown, Gus Kahn) – 7:45
3. "Impressions of Scandinavia" (Clifford Jordan) – 5:08
4. "Sabbatical" – 8:10
5. "Ugetsu" – 5:04

== Personnel ==
- Cedar Walton – piano, electric piano
- Blue Mitchell – trumpet
- Clifford Jordan – tenor saxophone, flute
- Bob Cranshaw – bass
- Mickey Roker – drums

=== Production ===
- Don Schlitten – producer
- Dave Jones – engineer
