= Astral Weeks (disambiguation) =

Astral Weeks is a 1968 album by Van Morrison.

Astral Weeks may also refer to:

- Astral Weeks (Charles Mingus album), a 1990 bootleg album
- "Astral Weeks" (song), the title track of the Van Morrison album
- Astral Weeks Live at the Hollywood Bowl, a 2009 live album by Van Morrison featuring the songs of Astral Weeks
