= Straight Ahead (Abbey Lincoln album) =

Studio album by Abbey Lincoln
- Released: 1961
- Recorded: February 22, 1961
- Genre: Jazz
- Length: 38:52
- Label: Candid
- Producer: Nat Hentoff

Abbey Lincoln chronology
Abbey Is Blue (1959)	Straight Ahead (1961)	People in Me (1973)

Straight Ahead is an album by American jazz vocalist Abbey Lincoln featuring performances recorded in 1961 for the Candid label.

== Reception ==
Professional ratings
Review scores
Source	Rating
AllMusic	5/5 stars
MusicHound Jazz	5/5 stars
The Penguin Guide to Jazz Recordings	3/4 stars
The Rolling Stone Jazz Record Guide	3/5 stars
The Virgin Encyclopedia of Jazz	4/5 stars

The editors of AllMusic awarded the album 5 stars, and reviewer Scott Yanow stated that "this is one of Abbey Lincoln's greatest recordings".

The authors of The Penguin Guide to Jazz Recordings singled out the track titled "Retribution" for praise, writing: "For the first time, Lincoln seems willing to confront her music rather than stand up-stage of it. 'Retribution' is raw, responsive and aware. It boded well for what was to come."

== Track listing ==
1. "Straight Ahead" (Abbey Lincoln, Earl Baker, Mal Waldron) — 5:24
2. "When Malindy Sings" (Oscar Brown, Paul Lawrence Dunbar) — 4:05
3. "In the Red" (Chips Bayen, Abbey Lincoln, Max Roach) — 8:32
4. "Blue Monk" (Abbey Lincoln, Thelonious Monk) — 6:39
5. "Left Alone" (Billie Holiday, Mal Waldron) — 6:48
6. "African Lady" (Langston Hughes, Randy Weston) — 3:46
7. "Retribution" (Abbey Lincoln, Julian Priester) — 3:50

- Recorded at Nola Penthouse Studios in New York City on February 22, 1961

== Personnel ==
- Abbey Lincoln — vocals
- Booker Little — trumpet
- Julian Priester — trombone
- Eric Dolphy — alto saxophone, bass clarinet, flute, piccolo
- Walter Benton — tenor saxophone
- Coleman Hawkins — tenor saxophone
- Mal Waldron — piano
- Art Davis — bass
- Max Roach — drums
- Roger Sanders, Robert Whitley — congas
