= Live at Ethell's =

Live album by Clifford Jordan Quartet
- Released: 1990
- Recorded: October 16–18, 1987
- Venue: Ethell's, Baltimore, MD
- Genre: Jazz
- Length: 59:23
- Label: Mapleshade MHS 512629A
- Producer: Clifford Jordan, Pierre Sprey

Clifford Jordan chronology
Royal Ballads (1986)	Live at Ethell's (1990)	Blue Head (1990)

Live at Ethell's is a live album by saxophonist Clifford Jordan which was recorded in Baltimore in 1987 and released on the Mapleshade label.

== Reception ==
Professional ratings
Review scores
Source	Rating
AllMusic	4.5/5 stars

The AllMusic review by Scott Yanow called it, "Excellent advanced straight-ahead jazz from an underrated great".

== Track listing ==
No.	Title	Writer(s)	Length
1.	"Cal Massey"	Stanley Cowell	6:03
2.	"Summer Serenade"	Benny Carter	10:07
3.	"Lush Life"	Billy Strayhorn	9:20
4.	"'Round Midnight"	Thelonious Monk, Cootie Williams, Bernie Hanighen	8:56
5.	"Blues in Advance"	Clifford Jordon	6:50
6.	"Little Boy for So Long...Little Boy, But Not for Long"	Jordan	10:07
7.	"Arapaho"	Clifford Jordan, Barry Harris	9:50
8.	"Don't Get Around Much Anymore"	Duke Ellington, Bob Russell	7:10
Total length:			59:23

== Personnel ==
- Clifford Jordan – tenor saxophone
- Kevin O'Connell – piano
- Ed Howard – bass
- Vernel Fournier – drums
