= Walter Benton =

American jazz saxophonist. (1930–2000)

- Born: September 8, 1930; Los Angeles, California, United States
- Died: August 14, 2000 (aged 69)
- Genres: Jazz
- Instrument: Tenor saxophone

Walter Benton (September 8, 1930 in Los Angeles – August 14, 2000) was an American jazz tenor saxophonist.

Benton first began playing saxophone as a high schooler in Los Angeles. After three years of service in the Army in the early 1950s, he played in 1954 with Kenny Clarke, Max Roach, and Clifford Brown. From 1954 to 1957 he played with Perez Prado, including on a tour of Asia. He worked with Quincy Jones in 1957 and Victor Feldman in 1958-59. He led his own group from 1959, recording under his own name in 1960 with Freddie Hubbard, Wynton Kelly, Paul Chambers, and Tootie Heath. That same year he worked with Max Roach and Julian Priester. In 1961 he recorded with Abbey Lincoln, Roach again, Eric Dolphy, and Slide Hampton. Later in the 1960s he worked with Gerald Wilson and John Anderson. Benton retired from music in 1966 and became a real estate agent.

== Discography ==
=== As leader ===
- Out of This World (Jazzland, 1960)

=== As sideman ===
With Clifford Brown

- Best Coast Jazz (Emarcy, 1954)
- Clifford Brown All Stars (Emarcy, 1954 [1956])

With Kenny Clarke

- Telefunken Blues (Savoy, 1955)

With Quincy Jones

- Go West, Man! (ABC Paramount, 1957)

with Victor Feldman

- Latinsville! (Contemporary, 1960)

With Milt Jackson

- Meet Milt Jackson (Savoy, 1954)

With Abbey Lincoln

- Straight Ahead (Candid, 1961)

With Julian Priester

- Spiritsville (Jazzland, 1960)

With Jazz Artists Guild

- Newport Rebels (Candid, 1961)

With Max Roach

- We Insist! (Candid, 1960)
