= Spiritsville =

Studio album by Julian Priester
- Released: 1960
- Recorded: July 12, 1960
- Studios: Plaza Sound Studios, New York City
- Genre: Jazz
- Labels: Jazzland; JLP 25
- Producer: Orrin Keepnews

Julian Priester chronology
Keep Swingin' (1960)	Spiritsville (1960)	Love, Love (1973)

Spiritsville is the second album led by American jazz trombonist Julian Priester which was recorded in 1960 for Riverside's subsidiary Jazzland label.

The album was reissued as part of the 2001 Milestone compilation Out of This World, paired with Walter Benton's album of the same name.

== Reception ==
Professional ratings
Review scores
Source	Rating
AllMusic	3/5 stars

The AllMusic site awarded the album 3 stars.

François van de Linde of Flophouse Magazine stated that Spiritsville has "no lack" of swing, and called it "a fine album that boasts the challenging tune 'Excursion' and a great ballad reading by Priester of 'It Might As Well Be Spring'."

== Track listing ==
All compositions by Julian Priester except as indicated

1. "Chi-Chi" (Charlie Parker) - 4:43
2. "Blue Stride" - 6:15
3. "It Might as Well Be Spring" (Richard Rodgers, Oscar Hammerstein II) - 5:47
4. "Excursion" (Walter Benton) - 5:42
5. "Spiritsville" - 7:31
6. "My Romance" (Rodgers, Lorenz Hart) - 5:50
7. "Donna's Waltz" - 5:32

== Personnel ==
- Julian Priester - trombone
- Walter Benton - tenor saxophone (tracks 1, 2 & 4–7)
- Charles Davis - baritone saxophone (tracks 1, 2 & 4–7)
- McCoy Tyner - piano
- Sam Jones - bass
- Art Taylor - drums
