= Hints on Light and Shadow =

Studio album by Julian Priester and Sam Rivers
- Released: 1997
- Recorded: November 14 and 15, 1996
- Genre: Free jazz
- Length: 48:47
- Labels: Postcards; POST 1017
- Producer: Ralph Simon

Julian Priester chronology
Polarization (1977)	Hints on Light and Shadow (1997)	In Deep End Dance (2002)

Hints on Light and Shadow is an album by trombonist Julian Priester and saxophonist Sam Rivers. It was recorded on November 14 and 15, 1996, and was released in 1997 by Postcards Records, now part of the Arkadia label. On the album, Priester and Rivers are joined by electronic musician Tucker Martine.

== Reception ==
Professional ratings
Review scores
Source	Rating
All About Jazz	3.5/5 stars
AllMusic	2.5/5 stars
The Penguin Guide to Jazz	3/4 stars

In a review for All About Jazz, Glenn Astarita stated that the album is "modern, at times free-flowing yet conveys a sense of buoyancy and clear-sightedness which for the most part may seem transparent to the listener."

Geoffrey Himes of The Washington Post commented: "If the abstraction of these pieces makes them a bit challenging to enter, the obvious intelligence, high standards and restless curiosity of Rivers' playing makes it well worth the effort... Priester... is an able foil for Rivers... Martine stays in the background and allows Priester's smears and smudges of sound to provide a stimulating counterpoint to Rivers's darting, jagged lines."

AllMusic's Steve Loewy wrote: "While the idea of bringing these two very accomplished players together must have appeared to be a no-miss effort, in reality they each seem to be improvising around, rather than with, each other."

Writing for Salon, Michael Ullman stated that Priester and Rivers "seem to belong together" on the album, and remarked: "Suggestive, challenging, informal and occasional irritating, Hints is not, as Dexter Gordon liked to say about music he liked, your average B flat."

The authors of The Penguin Guide to Jazz Recordings called the album "a disappointing set," noting that "Martine's electronic backgrounds sometimes add an attractive dimension but often disguise an emptiness as the centre."

== Track listing ==
1. "Heads of the People" (Tucker Martine) – 6:51
2. "Desire" (Sam Rivers) – 5:55
3. "Zone" (Sam Rivers) – 3:41
4. "The New System" (Julian Priester, Sam Rivers) – 5:14
5. "Mister Mayor and Mister Miser" (Julian Priester, Sam Rivers) – 7:11
6. "Autumnal Influences: The Book of Beauty" (Julian Priester, Sam Rivers) – 5:54
7. "Public Servant" (Julian Priester, Sam Rivers) – 4:16
8. "The Circumlocution Office" (Julian Priester, Sam Rivers) – 4:15
9. "Chiaroscuro" (Julian Priester, Sam Rivers) – 5:07

== Personnel ==
- Julian Priester – trombone
- Sam Rivers – tenor saxophone, soprano saxophone, flute, piano
- Tucker Martine – electronics
