= Showcase (Philly Joe Jones album) =

Studio album by Philly Joe Jones
- Released: 1959
- Recorded: November 17–18, 1959; New York City
- Genre: Jazz
- Length: 38:02
- Label: Riverside; RLP 12-313
- Producer: Orrin Keepnews

Philly Joe Jones chronology
Drums Around the World (1959)	Showcase (1959)	Philly Joe's Beat (1960)

Showcase is the third album led by American jazz drummer Philly Joe Jones which was recorded in 1959 for the Riverside label.

== Reception ==
Professional ratings
Review scores
Source	Rating
Allmusic	4/5 stars
The Rolling Stone Jazz Record Guide	4/5 stars
The Penguin Guide to Jazz Recordings	3/4 stars

The Allmusic review called it "a particularly interesting hard bop-oriented set... well-conceived, diverse, and recommended".

== Track listing ==
All compositions by Philly Joe Jones except as indicated

1. "Battery Blues" (Julian Priester) - 4:06
2. "Minor Mode" (Bill Barron) - 4:26
3. "Gwen" - 3:57
4. "Joe's Debut" - 5:35
5. "Gone" (George Gershwin, Ira Gershwin, DuBose Heyward) - 4:42
6. "Joe's Delight" - 3:50
7. "Julia" (Priester) - 3:26
8. "I'll Never Be The Same" (Gus Kahn, Matty Malneck, Frank Signorelli) - 3:58
9. "Interpretation" (Barron) - 4:02
- Recorded in New York City on November 17 (tracks 1, 4 & 6–8) and November 18 (tracks 2, 3, 5 & 9), 1959.

== Personnel ==
- Philly Joe Jones - drums, piano (track 3)
- Blue Mitchell - trumpet (tracks 1, 2 & 4–9)
- Julian Priester - trombone (tracks 1, 2 & 4–9)
- Bill Barron - tenor saxophone (tracks 1, 2 & 4–9)
- Pepper Adams - baritone saxophone (tracks 1, 2 & 4–9)
- Dolo Coker (tracks 1, 4 & 6–8), Sonny Clark (tracks 2, 5 & 9) - piano
- Jimmy Garrison - bass (tracks 1–9)
