= Love, Love =

Studio album by Julian Priester Pepo Mtoto
- Released: 1974
- Recorded: June 28 and September 13, 1973
- Studios: Different Fur Music; San Francisco, California
- Genres: Avant-garde jazz; jazz fusion; jazz-funk; post-bop
- Length: 37:54
- Label: ECM 1044 ST
- Producers: Julian Priester, Pat Gleeson

Julian Priester chronology
Spiritsville (1960)	Love, Love (1974)	Polarization (1977)

Love, Love is an album by American jazz trombonist and composer Julian Priester Pepo Mtoto recorded in two sessions on June 28 and September 13, 1973 and released on ECM the following year.

== Reception ==
Professional ratings
Review scores
Source	Rating
All About Jazz	4/5 stars
AllMusic	3.5/5 stars
Jazzwise	5/5 stars
The Penguin Guide to Jazz Recordings	4/4 stars

The editors of AllMusic gave the album 3½ stars, with reviewer Scott Yanow stating "The two lengthy improvisations are mostly on one-chord repetitive rhythmic vamps stated by the bass, featuring sound explorations and plenty of electronics. Only on the last half of the second medley does Priester himself emerge a bit from the electronic sounds. One is reminded of Bitches Brew, since that is an obvious influence, but also Hancock's group and Weather Report. The music develops slowly, but listeners with patience will enjoy the blending of the many different voices in this unusual musical stew."

The authors of The Penguin Guide to Jazz Recordings awarded the album a full 4 stars, describing it as "one of the best albums of its period, subtly contrived and richly executed by a fascinating ensemble."

John Kelman of All About Jazz noted that "In the midst of pyrotechnic fusion groups like Mahavishnu Orchestra and Return to Forever, Love, Love... represented a different kind of fusion, relying more on texture, groove, and collective improvisation than complex arrangement and high-velocity soloing... its collective approach and spirited vitality retain a sense of freshness and excitement thirty years later."

The BBC's Colin Buttimer called the recording "a monster of an album... a must for anybody interested in living, breathing, unexpected music," and stated that the title track "grabs the listener by the lapels and proceeds to groove remorselessly for a full nineteen minutes."

Writing for Between Sound and Space, Tyran Grillo remarked: "The music... at once sails through the clouds of its infatuations and plunges into the oceanic expanse of its fears. It knows exactly where it's going, and hopes that you will be waiting on the other side."

== Track listing ==
All tracks are written by Julian Priester Pepo Mtoto.

Side I
No.	Title	Length
1.	"Prologue/Love, Love"	19:30

Side II
No.	Title	Length
1.	"Images/Eternal Worlds/Epilogue"	18:24

== Personnel ==
- Julian Priester Pepo Mtobo – trombone, horns, whistle, flute, percussion, synthesizer
- Pat Gleeson – synthesizer
- Hadley Caliman – flute, saxophone, clarinet
- Mguanda David Johnson – flute, saxophone
- Bill Connors – electric guitar
- Bayete Umbra Zindiko – piano, clavinet
- Ron McClure – electric bass (track 1)
- Nyimbo Henry Franklin – electric bass (track 2)
- Ndugu Leon Chancler – drums
- Kamau Eric Gravatt – drums, congas
