= Dr. Chicago =

Studio album by Clifford Jordan
- Released: 1985
- Recorded: August 3, 1984
- Studio: Vanguard Studios, NYC
- Genre: Jazz
- Length: 42:55
- Label: Bee Hive Records BH 7018
- Producer: Jim Neumann, Susan Neumann

Clifford Jordan chronology
| Repetition (1984) | Dr. Chicago (1985) | Two Tenor Winner (1984) |

Dr. Chicago is an album by saxophonist Clifford Jordan which was recorded in 1984 and released on the Bee Hive label.

== Reception ==
Professional ratings
Review scores
| Source | Rating |
|---|---|
| AllMusic | 4/5 stars |

The AllMusic review by Scott Yanow stated, "The repertoire is colorful and diverse (three jazz standards, an obscurity, Jordan's bluesy title cut and Fournier's intriguing "Zombie"), and the very consistent Jordan is up to his usual high level".

== Track listing ==
| No. | Title | Writer(s) | Length |
|---|---|---|---|
| 1. | "Dr. Chicago" | Clifford Jordan | 5:52 |
| 2. | "Something to Live For" | Duke Ellington, Billy Strayhorn | 12:00 |
| 3. | "Zombie" | Vernel Fournier | 5:23 |
| 4. | "Touch Love" | Alonzo Levister | 5:44 |
| 5. | "If I Had You" | Irving King, with Ted Shapiro | 7:07 |
| 6. | "Bebop" | Dizzy Gillespie | 6:49 |
| Total length: | | | 42:55 |

== Personnel ==
- Clifford Jordan – tenor saxophone
- Red Rodney – trumpet, flugelhorn
- Jaki Byard – piano
- Ed Howard – bass
- Vernel Fournier – drums
