= George Handy =

American arranger, composer and pianist (1920–1997)

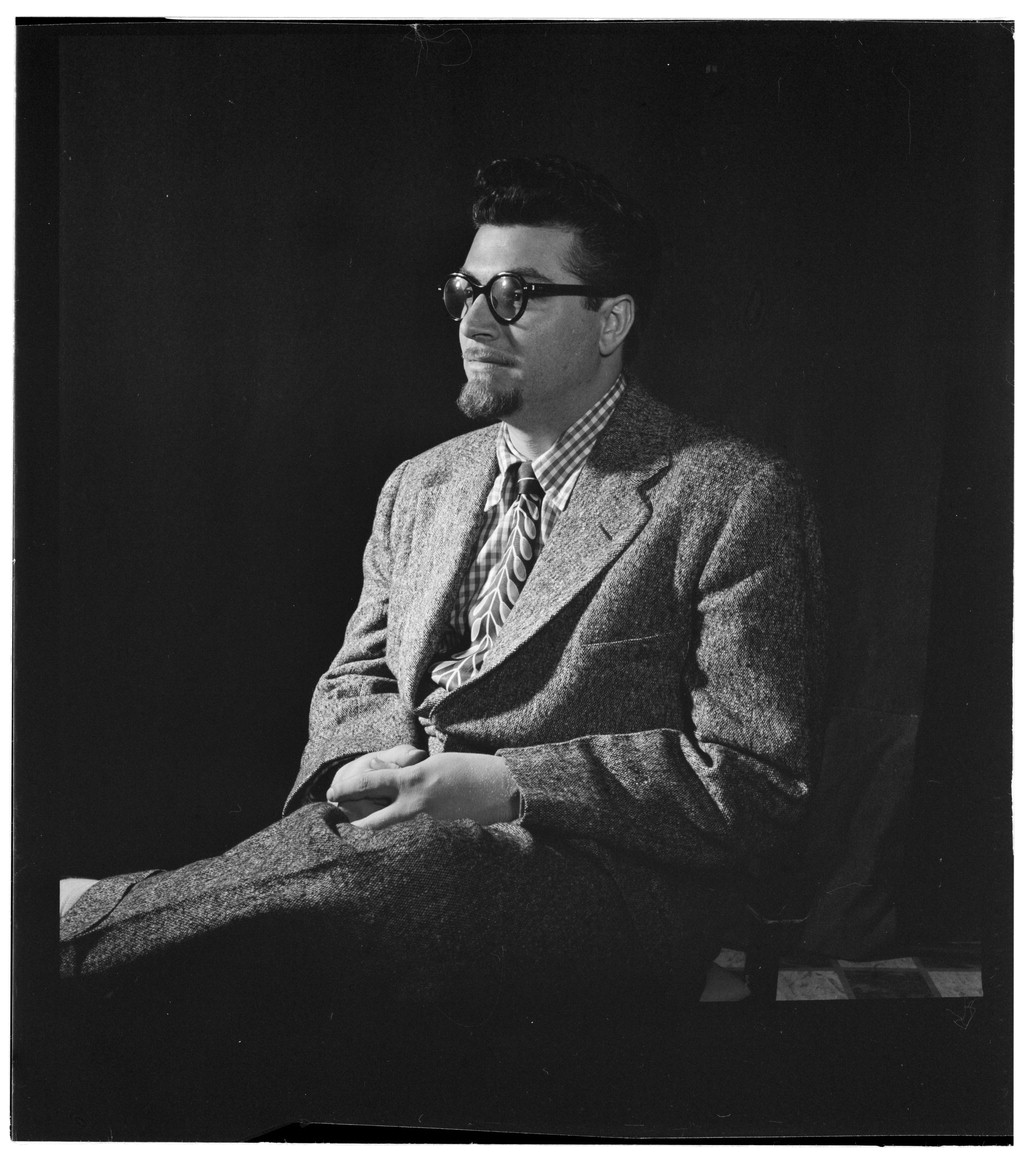
- Handy in c.1947

Background information
- Born: George Joseph Hendleman; January 17, 1920; New York City, U.S.
- Died: January 8, 1997 (aged 76) Harris, New York, U.S.
- Genres: Jazz
- Occupations: Musician, arranger, composer
- Instrument: Piano

George Handy (born George Joseph Hendleman) (January 17, 1920 – January 8, 1997) was an American jazz arranger, composer and pianist whose musical beginnings were fostered under the tutelage of composer Aaron Copland. While he had an impressive career as a pianist, he is best known in retrospect for his bebop arrangements.

== Life ==
Born in New York City, Handy first worked professionally as a swing pianist for Michael Loring in 1938, but soon was drafted into the United States Army in 1940. From 1944 to 1946 he became a member of the Boyd Raeburn Orchestra, composing and performing on piano. This was during a time when many big bands were transforming their musical tendencies toward bebop. He did leave the orchestra briefly to do work for Paramount Studios, but returned to Raeburn quickly. During this period he entered one of his most creative periods, doing arrangements of older standards with a distinctly bebop quality. Just as he was entering his prime, however, he had a falling out with Raeburn and left the group. While he continued to arrange for other musicians in his later career, it is that 1944–1946 period for which he is remembered most. AllMusic noted that "He was pianist with Zoot Sims' combo during 1956–1957 but mostly worked outside of jazz during his last four decades, although he did spend some time as a Down Beat critic during the latter half of the 60s."

Handy died in Harris, New York, in January 1997 at the age of 76, from heart disease.

== Discography ==
=== As leader ===
- Handyland U.S.A. (X, 1954)
- By George! (Handy, Of Course) (X, 1956)

=== As sideman ===
- Charlie Parker, The Complete Dial Sessions (Stash, 1993) (one composition; not performing)
- Boyd Raeburn, Jewells (Savoy, 1980; recordings from 1945-1949) (piano)
- Zoot Sims, Zoot! (Riverside, 1957; recorded, 1956) (piano and arrangement)
- Zoot Sims, Zoot Sims Plays Four Altos (ABC-Paramount, 1957) (piano)
