= The Mellow Side of Clifford Jordan =

Studio album by Clifford Jordan
- Released: 1997
- Recorded: 1989–1991
- Genre: Jazz
- Length: 50:14
- Label: Mapleshade 05032
- Producer: Larry Willis, Pierre Sprey

Clifford Jordan chronology
| Four Play (1990) | The Mellow Side of Clifford Jordan (1997) | Play What You Feel (1991) |

The Mellow Side of Clifford Jordan is an album by saxophonist Clifford Jordan which was recorded between 1989 and 1991 and released on the Mapleshade label in 1997.

== Reception ==
Professional ratings
Review scores
| Source | Rating |
|---|---|
| AllMusic | 4/5 stars |
| The Penguin Guide to Jazz Recordings | 3/4 stars |

The AllMusic review by Scott Yanow observed: "Although not completely flawless, the music is quite rewarding overall and displays the flexibility and creativity of the late great Clifford Jordan".

== Track listing ==
| No. | Title | Writer(s) | Length |
|---|---|---|---|
| 1. | "Embraceable You" | George Gershwin, Ira Gershwin | 5:18 |
| 2. | "CJ's Riff" | Carter Jefferson | 2:56 |
| 3. | "Trees" | Oscar Rasbach, Joyce Kilmer | 9:00 |
| 4. | "Jug's Groove" | Jordan | 4:07 |
| 5. | "Soul Eyes" | Mal Waldron | 16:32 |
| 6. | "Five 'n' Free" | Jordan | 5:42 |
| 7. | "Day Dream" | Duke Ellington, Billy Strayhorn, John La Touche | 6:53 |
| Total length: | | | 50:14 |

== Personnel ==
- Clifford Jordan – tenor saxophone, soprano saxophone
- Kenny Reed – trumpet (track 3)
- Julian Priester – trombone (track 6)
- Carter Jefferson – tenor saxophone (tracks 2 & 6)
- Fred Cook – baritone saxophone (track 6)
- Chris Anderson (track 7), Larry Willis (track 3) – piano
- Mike LeDonne – B3 organ (track 1)
- Rudy Turner – electric guitar (track 4)
- Edson Machado – drums (track 1)
- Nasser Abadey – percussion (tracks 2 & 6)
