= Breezing (album) =

Studio album by Sonny Red
- Released: 1961
- Recorded: November 3, 1960
- Studio: Plaza Sound Studios, NYC
- Genre: Jazz
- Label: Jazzland; JLP 32

Sonny Red chronology
Out of the Blue (1960)	Breezing (1961)	A Story Tale (1961)

Professional ratings
Review scores
Source	Rating
Allmusic	3/5 stars

Breezing is an album by American saxophonist Sonny Red recorded in late 1960 and released in 1961 on the Jazzland label.

== Track listing ==
All compositions by Sonny Red except as indicated

1. "Brother B" - 5:02
2. "All I Do Is Dream of You" (Arthur Freed, Nacio Herb Brown) - 4:03
3. "The New Blues" - 5:34
4. "Ditty" - 4:36
5. "'Teef" - 6:26
6. "Breezing" - 6:06
7. "A Handful of Stars" (Ted Shapiro, Jack Lawrence) - 4:42
8. "If There Is Someone Lovelier Than You" (Howard Dietz, Arthur Schwartz) - 2:50

== Personnel ==
- Sonny Red - alto saxophone
- Blue Mitchell - trumpet (tracks 1, 3, 5 & 6)
- Yusef Lateef - tenor saxophone (tracks 1, 3, 5 & 6)
- Barry Harris - piano
- Bob Cranshaw - bass
- Albert Heath - drums
