= Drink Plenty Water =

Studio album by Clifford Jordan
- Released: 2023
- Recorded: August, 1974
- Studio: Minot Studio, White Plains, New York
- Genre: Hard bop; post-bop; modern big band
- Length: 35:37
- Label: Harvest Song Records; HS2022-1
- Producer: Clifford Jordan

Clifford Jordan chronology
Glass Bead Games (1973)	Drink Plenty Water (2023)	Half Note (1985)

Drink Plenty Water is a studio album by saxophonist Clifford Jordan recorded in 1974 and released in 2023. This recording was anticipated as Jordan's next album after his well-received 1973 double-LP, Glass Bead Games. It would also have been his third release with Strata-East Records. Unfortunately, this label went out of business in 1975, so the album never saw a release.

The original tapes, found in the archives by Jordan's widow, Sandy Jordan, were subsequently remastered and officially issued on CD through her label, Harvest Song Records.

This particular recording stands out as Jordan's sole lead vocal performance, with arrangements from bassist Bill Lee. The accompanying musicians include Bill Hardman on trumpet, Dick Griffin on trombone, Charlie Rouse on bass clarinet, and Bernard Fennell on cello. Clifford Jordan's then-16-year-old daughter, Donna Harris, handles the lead vocals.

== Reception ==
Professional ratings
Review scores
Source	Rating
All About Jazz	4/5 stars

For Marc Myers "Clifford Jordan sounds terrific here along with his friends invited to participate" and Drink Plenty Water "is an unusual storytelling record, with spoken word over music and background vocals, but it's plenty soulful, earthy and musical.

In the liner notes of the CD, Swiss pianist Franz Biffiger, describes this album as the pure opposite of its predecessor Glass Bead Games, claiming the latter as the "highest level of the Clifford Jordan Quartet work and this as a social and musical event in the tradition of Black folk music."

Pierre Giroux from All About Jazz, qualifies this album with 4 stars, defining it as "an exciting blend of traditional and contemporary jazz elements and adds to Clifford Jordan's discography legacy."

== Track listing ==
Music and lyrics composed by Clifford Jordan, except lyrics of track #6 by David Smyrl.

1. "The Highest Mountain" – 3:54
2. "Witch Doctor's Chant (Ee-Bah-Lickey-Doo) " – 3:08
3. "Drink Plenty Water and Walk Slow" – 3:08
4. "I've Got a Feeling for You" – 3:13
5. "My Papa's Coming Home" – 3:09
6. "Talking Blues" – 9:32
7. "Talking Blues" (Instrumental) – 9:33

== Personnel ==
- Clifford Jordan – tenor saxophone
- Dick Griffin – trombone
- Bill Hardman – trumpet
- Charlie Rouse – bass clarinet
- Bernard Fennell – cello
- Stanley Cowell – piano
- Sam Jones – bass
- Bill Lee – bass
- Billy Higgins – drums
- David Smyrl – vocals
- Donna Jordan Harris – vocals
- Kathy O'Boyle, Denise Williams, Muriel Winston – backing vocals

== Production ==
- Clifford Jordan – producer
- Malcolm Addey, Charles Tolliver – mixing and mastering
- Sandra Williams Jordan, Frank Ruegger – design
- Martin Bough (cover), Clifford Jordan Sr (pg. 3-left), Michael Wilderman (pg.3-right), Raymond Ross (pg.4), Norma Lederer (pg.11) – photography
- Charles Tolliver, Franz Biffiger – liner notes
