= Out of This World (Walter Benton album) =

Studio album by Walter Benton
- Released: 1960
- Recorded: September 19 & 21, 1960
- Studio: Plaza Sound Studios
- Genre: Jazz
- Label: Jazzland; JLP 28
- Producer: Orrin Keepnews

Out of This World is the sole album led by American jazz saxophonist Walter Benton which was recorded in 1960 for the Jazzland label.

The album was reissued as part of the 2001 Milestone compilation Out of This World, paired with Julian Priester 's Spiritsville.

== Reception ==
Professional ratings
Review scores
Source	Rating
AllMusic	3/5 stars

The AllMusic site awarded the album 3 stars, and reviewer Alex Henderson noted that it gives listeners a chance to hear Hubbard early in his career, although his solos "aren't as adventurous or cutting-edge as other things [he] did in the early '60s."

Metronome's Ted White called the recording "a superior set," but stated that, despite the album title, "The charts are the usual non-challenging jump-off points for soloing, and the soloists attempt nothing new, nothing startling."

Nat Hentoff of HiFi/Stereo Review described the album as "one of the more stimulating programs released so far" on Jazzland, and remarked: "It is relatively diversified as to mood and tempo, and the playing has urgency... [Benton's] musical conceptions show increasing individuality, and he has chosen challenging associates for this recording."

== Track listing ==
All compositions by Walter Benton except as indicated

1. "Out of This World" (Harold Arlen, Johnny Mercer) - 5:43
2. "Walter's Altar" - 8:26
3. "Iris" - 5:24
4. "Night Movements" - 2:43
5. "A Blues Mood" - 7:30
6. "Azil" - 4:36
7. "Lover Man" (Jimmy Davis, Ram Ramirez, James Sherman) - 8:45

== Personnel ==
- Walter Benton - tenor saxophone
- Freddie Hubbard - trumpet (tracks 1, 2, 4 & 6)
- Wynton Kelly - piano
- Paul Chambers - bass
- Jimmy Cobb (tracks 1, 2, 4 & 6), Albert Heath (tracks 3, 5 & 7) - drums
