= These are My Roots: Clifford Jordan Plays Leadbelly =

Studio album by Clifford Jordan
- Released: 1965
- Recorded: February 1 & 17, 1965; New York City
- Genre: Jazz
- Length: 38:13
- Label: Atlantic; SD 1444
- Producer: Donald Elfman

Clifford Jordan chronology
Bearcat (1962)	These are My Roots: Clifford Jordan Plays Leadbelly (1965)	Soul Fountain (1966)

These are My Roots: Clifford Jordan Plays Leadbelly is an album featuring jazz saxophonist Clifford Jordan performing tunes associated with Huddie "Lead Belly" Ledbetter which was recorded in 1965 and released on the Atlantic label.

== Reception ==
Professional ratings
Review scores
Source	Rating
Allmusic	4/5 stars
The Penguin Guide to Jazz Recordings	3/4 stars

The Allmusic site awarded the album 4 stars with the review by Scott Yanow stating, "Overall, this project is an unexpected success -- one would not have thought that Clifford Jordan and Leadbelly had that much in common!"

== Track listing ==
All compositions are Traditional except as indicated

1. "Dick's Holler" – 4:53
2. "Silver City Bound" – 2:41
3. "Take This Hammer" – 4:18
4. "Black Betty" – 2:59
5. "The Highest Mountain" (Clifford Jordan) – 4:17
6. "Goodnight Irene" (Huddie Ledbetter) – 4:29
7. "De Gray Goose" – 3:38
8. "Black Girl" – 4:22
9. "Jolly O' the Ransom" – 2:22
10. "Yellow Gal" – 4:27

== Personnel ==
- Clifford Jordan — tenor saxophone
- Roy Burrowes – trumpet
- Julian Priester – trombone
- Cedar Walton – piano
- Chuck Wayne – banjo
- Richard Davis – bass
- Albert Heath – drums
- Sandra Douglas – vocals (tracks 3 & 8)
