= Hyde Park After Dark =

Studio album by Clifford Jordan Quartet
- Released: 1981
- Recorded: September 5, 1981
- Studio: P.S. Studios, Chicago.
- Genre: Jazz
- Length: 45:22
- Label: Bee Hive Records BH 7014
- Producer: Jim Neumann, Susan Neumann

Clifford Jordan chronology
Hello, Hank Jones (1978)	Hyde Park After Dark (1981)	Repetition (1984)

Professional ratings
Review scores
Source	Rating
Allmusic	3/5 stars

Hyde Park After Dark is an album by saxophonist Clifford Jordan which was recorded in Chicago in 1981 together with Victor Sproles on bass, Wilbur Campbell on drums, Norman Simmons on piano, Cy Touff on bass trumpet, and Von Freeman on saxophone. The album is a tribute to the Chicago jazz scene and a reunion of important players from the 1950s.

== Track listing ==
No.	Title	Writer(s)	Length
1.	"Hyde Park After Dark"	Clifford Jordan	7:14
2.	"You're Blasé"	Ord Hamilton, Bruce Siever	6:19
3.	"Lotus Blossom"	Kenny Dorham	6:11
4.	"Sad Sam"	Norman Simmons	6:51
5.	"I Waited for You"	Walter Gil Fuller, Dizzy Gillespie	5:31
6.	"I'm Glad There Is You"	Jimmy Dorsey, Paul Madeira	3:28
7.	"2° East, 3° West"	John Lewis	6:48
Total length:			45:22

== Personnel ==
Band

- Victor Sproles – bass
- Wilbur Campbell – drums
- Norman Simmons – piano
- Cy Touff – bass trumpet
- Von Freeman – tenor saxophone
- Clifford Jordan – tenor saxophone

Production

- Malcolm Addey – engineer
- Hank Hechtman – cover
- Norman Simmons – arranging
- Dick Sorensen – layout
- Chris Erbach – photography
- Jim Neumann – producer
- Susan Neumann – producer
- Paul Serrano – recording
