= Hello, Hank Jones =

Studio album by Clifford Jordan
- Released: 1978
- Recorded: July 25, 1978
- Studio: Mediasound, New York City
- Genre: Jazz
- Length: 31:50
- Label: Eastworld; EWLF-98003
- Producer: Yoshio Ozawa

Clifford Jordan chronology
The Adventurer (1978)	Hello, Hank Jones (1978)	Hyde Park After Dark (1981)

Hello, Hank Jones is an album by saxophonist Clifford Jordan which was recorded direct-to-disc in New York City in 1977 and released on the Japanese Eastworld label.

== Reception ==
Professional ratings
Review scores
Source	Rating
Allmusic	4/5 stars
The Rolling Stone Jazz Record Guide	4/5 stars

In his review on Allmusic, Ken Dryden stated "Jordan, who is the leader of the session, shines on tenor sax, driven by an outstanding rhythm section... Any jazz fan fortunate enough to locate a copy decades later will enjoy the performances and marvel at the warm, very intimate sound achieved by the musicians and the engineers on that summer day in 1978"

== Track listing ==
All compositions by Clifford Jordan except as indicated

1. "Vienna" - 16:19
2. "Bohemia After Dark" (Oscar Pettiford) - 7:29
3. "Love for Sale" (Cole Porter) - 8:02

== Personnel ==
- Clifford Jordan - tenor saxophone
- Hank Jones - piano
- Reggie Workman - bass
- Freddie Waits - drums
