= Starting Time =

Studio album by Clifford Jordan
- Released: 1961
- Recorded: June 14–15, 1961
- Studio: Plaza Sound Studios, New York City
- Genre: Jazz
- Label: Jazzland; JLP 52
- Producer: Orrin Keepnews

Clifford Jordan chronology
| A Story Tale (1961) | Starting Time (1961) | Bearcat (1962) |

Starting Time is an album by jazz saxophonist Clifford Jordan which was recorded in 1961 and released on the Jazzland label.

== Reception ==
Professional ratings
Review scores
| Source | Rating |
|---|---|
| Down Beat | 4/5 stars |
| Allmusic | 3/5 stars |
| The Rolling Stone Jazz Record Guide | 4/5 stars |

The Allmusic site awarded the album 3 stars. The review by Scott Yanow stated: "The music is straight-ahead, and although the tunes are pretty obscure, the solos and high musicianship uplift the music. Recommended to straight-ahead jazz collectors".

== Track listing ==
All compositions by Clifford Jordan except as indicated

1. "Sunrise in Mexico" (Kenny Dorham) - 5:58
2. "Extempore" - 5:15
3. "Down Through the Years" - 4:45
4. "Quittin' Time" - 4:40
5. "One Flight Down" (Cedar Walton) - 4:43
6. "Windmill" (Dorham) - 3:52
7. "Don't You Know I Care" (Duke Ellington, Mack David) - 4:55
8. "Mosaic" (Walton) - 4:56

== Personnel ==
- Clifford Jordan - tenor saxophone
- Kenny Dorham - trumpet
- Cedar Walton - piano
- Wilbur Ware - bass
- Albert Heath - drums
