= Spectrum (Cedar Walton album) =

Studio album by Cedar Walton
- Released: 1968
- Recorded: May 24, 1968; New York City
- Genre: Jazz
- Label: Prestige; PR 7591
- Producer: Don Schlitten

Cedar Walton chronology
Cedar! (1967)	Spectrum (1968)	The Electric Boogaloo Song (1969)

Spectrum is an album by pianist Cedar Walton, recorded in 1968 and released on the Prestige label.

== Reception ==
Professional ratings
Review scores
Source	Rating
AllMusic	3/5 stars
The Rolling Stone Jazz Record Guide	4/5 stars
The Penguin Guide to Jazz Recordings	3/4 stars

The AllMusic review by Scott Yanow stated: "The music, essentially advanced hard bop with a few odd twists, is well-played if not essential."

== Track listing ==
All compositions by Cedar Walton, except as indicated

1. "Higgins Holler" – 10:20
2. "Days of Wine and Roses" (Henry Mancini, Johnny Mercer) – 8:56
3. "Jake's Milkshakes" – 3:55
4. "Spectrum" – 5:39
5. "Lady Charlotte" (Cal Massey) – 6:14

== Personnel ==
- Cedar Walton – piano
- Blue Mitchell – trumpet (tracks 1 & 3–5)
- Clifford Jordan – tenor saxophone (tracks 1 & 3–5)
- Richard Davis – bass
- Jack DeJohnette – drums

=== Production ===
- Don Schlitten – producer
- Richard Alderson – engineer
