= Keep Swingin' =

Studio album by Julian Priester
- Released: 1960
- Recorded: January 11, 1960
- Studio: Reeves Sound Studios, New York City
- Genre: Jazz
- Length: 35:43
- Label: Riverside; RLP 12-316
- Producer: Orrin Keepnews

Julian Priester chronology
Keep Swingin' (1960)	Spiritsville (1960)

Keep Swingin is a 1960 album by American jazz trombonist Julian Priester, his debut as leader, which was recorded and released by the Riverside label.

== Reception ==
Professional ratings
Review scores
Source	Rating
AllMusic	4/5 stars
The Penguin Guide to Jazz Recordings	3.5/4 stars

The AllMusic site awarded the album 4 stars, with reviewer Scott Yanow calling it a "swinging, modern, mainstream session".

The authors of The Penguin Guide to Jazz Recordings described the album as "an excellent debut," featuring "short, well-crafted tunes with nicely defined shapes."

A writer for Billboard noted that Priester "impresses greatly" on the album, and commented: "He is as much at home with his inventive, ballad improvising, as he is on the up-tempo items. He has tone and technique, and this set gives promise of fine things."

François van de Linde of Flophouse Magazine remarked: "The stars stood in the right spot, the time was right, the guys were in sync, in a happy mood, comfortable... the mood is right. The session is relaxed yet urgent."

== Track listing ==
All compositions by Julian Priester except as indicated

1. "24-Hour Leave" (Jimmy Heath) - 7:00
2. "The End" - 3:51
3. "1239A" (Charles Davis) - 3:03
4. "Just Friends" (John Klenner, Sam M. Lewis) - 3:51
5. "Bob T's Blues" - 3:57
6. "Under the Surface" - 4:21
7. "Once in a While" (Michael Edwards, Bud Green) - 5:21
8. "Julian's Tune" - 4:19

== Personnel ==
- Julian Priester - trombone
- Tommy Flanagan - piano
- Sam Jones - bass
- Elvin Jones - drums
- Jimmy Heath - tenor saxophone (tracks 1–2, 4, 6–7)
