= Royal Ballads =

Studio album by Clifford Jordan Quartet
- Released: 1987
- Recorded: December 23, 1986
- Studio: Van Gelder, Englewood Cliffs, NJ
- Genre: Jazz
- Length: 58:08
- Label: Criss Cross Jazz; 1025
- Producer: Gerry Teekens

Clifford Jordan chronology
The Rotterdam Session (1985)	Royal Ballads (1987)	Live at Ethell's (1987)

Royal Ballads is an album by saxophonist Clifford Jordan's Quartet, recorded in late 1986 and released on the Dutch Criss Cross Jazz label.

== Reception ==
Professional ratings
Review scores
Source	Rating
AllMusic	4/5 stars
The Penguin Guide to Jazz Recordings	3.5/4 stars

In his review on AllMusic, Ken Dryden stated that "Clifford Jordan was still an important tenor saxophonist during the years prior to his death in 1993, though his final recording for Criss Cross is one of his lesser known dates... Any fan of Clifford Jordan will want to seek out this release."

== Track listing ==
1. "Lush Life" (Billy Strayhorn) - 7:53
2. "Pannonica" (Thelonious Monk) - 6:55
3. "Royal Blues" (Clifford Jordan) - 8:19
4. "Little Girl Blue" (Lorenz Hart, Richard Rodgers) - 8:18
5. "Armando" (Vernel Fournier) - 8:06
6. "Don't Get Around Much Anymore" (Duke Ellington, Bob Russell) - 6:56
7. "Everything Happens to Me" (Tom Adair, Matt Dennis) - 3:51 Bonus track on CD
8. "'Round About Midnight" (Thelonious Monk) - 8:24 Bonus track on CD

== Personnel ==
- Clifford Jordan - tenor saxophone
- Kevin O'Connell - piano
- Ed Howard - bass
- Vernel Fournier - drums
