= In Deep End Dance =

Studio album by Julian Priester
- Released: 2002
- Recorded: April 10–13, 2002
- Studio: Studio Litho, Seattle, Washington
- Genre: Free jazz
- Length: 1:02:02
- Label: Conduit Records; CR 1301
- Producer: Beck Henderer-Peña, Julian Priester

Julian Priester chronology
Hints on Light and Shadow (1997)	In Deep End Dance (2002)	Portraits and Silhouettes (2007)

In Deep End Dance is an album by trombonist Julian Priester. It was recorded during April 10–13, 2002, at Studio Litho in Seattle, Washington, and was released later that year by Conduit Records. On the album, Priester is joined by pianist Dawn Clement, double bassist Geoff Harper, and drummer Byron Vannoy. The recording features five Priester originals plus one composition by each band member.

== Reception ==
Professional ratings
Review scores
Source	Rating
The Penguin Guide to Jazz	3/4 stars

Marshall Bowden of PopMatters included the recording in his list of the top 10 albums of 2002, calling it a "disc that demands something of the listener... a gem, with compositions that help showcase [Priester's] inventive playing as well as the energetic work of his young group."

The authors of The Penguin Guide to Jazz Recordings noted that "there is a spiritual cast to the music," and described the album as "a highly expressive set, veering between the open, improvisational forms that [Priester] helped pioneer in the '70s and a more obviously expressive style."

Writing for JazzTimes, Doug Ramsey stated that the album "is evidence that as [Priester] went further out he kept a grip on fundamentals," and commented: "In Deep End Dance meets a fundamental requirement of music with staying power: The more you listen, the more you hear."

In an article for All About Jazz, Jerry D'Souza called the album "a stimulating piece of work," and noted that Priester's "impulses are well corralled and he does not somersault into excess, or for that matter go anywhere near it." Another AAJ reviewer remarked: "Very rarely can one boast of a recording that deserves attention from start to finish. Priester's In Deep End Dance is such a rarity."

One Final Note's Joe Milazzo noted that Priester is "in such fine voice throughout," and wrote: "the more you listen, the more clear it becomes that the entire album is a celebration of what Albert Ayler called spiritual unity, not political solidarity. This in itself is rare in contemporary improvised music that promotes a social agenda, where preaching often supplants the provision of creative, useful examples."

== Track listing ==
1. "In Deep" (Julian Priester) – 7:09
2. "Captured Imaginations" (Julian Priester) – 6:48
3. "Blues Sea" (Julian Priester) – 12:07
4. "Ecumene" (Julian Priester) – 5:37
5. "Thin Seam of Dark Blue Light" (Geoff Harper) – 6:56
6. "Mejatoto" (Byron Vannoy) – 8:12
7. "A Delicate Balance" (Dawn Clement) – 8:12
8. "End Dance" (Julian Priester) – 6:08

== Personnel ==
- Julian Priester – trombone
- Dawn Clement – piano
- Geoff Harper – double bass
- Byron Vannoy – drums
