= Four Play (album) =

Album by Clifford Jordan

Studio album by Clifford Jordan, Richard Davis, James Williams and Ronnie Burrage
- Released: 1990
- Recorded: 1990
- Studio: Big Box 901 Studio, Tokyo, Japan
- Genre: Jazz
- Length: 49:22
- Label: DIW DIW-836
- Producer: Kohei Kowakami and DIW

Clifford Jordan chronology
Masters from Different Worlds (1989)	Four Play (1990)	The Mellow Side of Clifford Jordan (1989-91)

Four Play is an album by saxophonist Clifford Jordan with bassist Richard Davis, pianist James Williams and drummer Ronnie Burrage which was recorded in Tokyo in 1990 and released on the Japanese DIW label.

== Reception ==
Professional ratings
Review scores
Source	Rating
AllMusic	4/5 stars

The AllMusic review by Scott Yanow stated, "Although this CD is technically listed under all four musicians' names, Jordan is primarily the lead voice. His sound was always instantly recognizable and he seemed to be in a good mood for the date, judging by the many song quotes he throws into his solos" calling it "a good example of the hard bop mainstream of the early 1990s as played by some of its best practioners [sic]".

== Track listing ==
No.	Title	Writer(s)	Length
1.	"Tokyo Road"	Clifford Jordan	7:19
2.	"Japanese Dream"	Jordan	11:38
3.	"I Mean You"	Thelonious Monk	6:01
4.	"For My Nephews"	James Williams	8:24
5.	"Hi-Fly"	Randy Weston	10:14
6.	"Misako: Beautiful Shore"	Richard Davis	6:24
Total length:			49:22

== Personnel ==
- Clifford Jordan – tenor saxophone
- James Williams – piano
- Richard Davis – bass
- Ronnie Burrage – drums
