= Polarization (album) =

Studio album by Julian Priester and Marine Intrusion
- Released: 1977
- Recorded: January 1977
- Studio: Tonstudio Bauer; Ludwigsburg, W. Germany
- Genre: Jazz
- Length: 43:40
- Label: ECM; ECM 1098 ST
- Producer: Manfred Eicher

Julian Priester chronology
Love, Love (1973)	Polarization (1977)	Hints on Light and Shadow (1997)

Polarization is an album by American jazz trombonist and composer Julian Priester and Marine Intrusion recorded in January 1977 and released on ECM later that year. The sextet features saxophonist Ron Stallings and rhythm section Ray Obiedo, Curtis Clark, Heshima Mark Williams and Augusta Lee Collins.

== Reception ==
Professional ratings
Review scores
Source	Rating
AllMusic	4/5 stars
The Penguin Guide to Jazz	3/4 stars

The AllMusic review by Richard S. Ginell says, "This is an often engaging record from a trombonist too seldom heard as a leader."

The Penguin Guide to Jazz Recordings noted that the album finds the musicians playing "in a spacious modern idiom, with carefully deployed electronics ... individual pieces are atmospheric but without sacrifice of linear energies."

A writer for Billboard called the music "lovely, often haunting", and commented: "Priester's flutters, stops, deep tones glide easily through the six compositions".

Writing for ECM blog Between Sound and Space, Tyran Grillo remarked: "Polarization delivers in its many moods and emotional travels. The musicians don't so much feed off as feed into one another, nourishing a delicate conversation in which agreement is the norm. Their harmonies are tender, the synergy relaxed and intuitive, acute yet soft around the edges."

== Track listing ==
All tracks are written by Julian Priester.

Side I
No.	Title	Length
1.	"Polarization"	5:01
2.	"Rhythm Magnet"	8:31
3.	"Wind Dolphin"	8:59
Total length:		22:31

Side II
No.	Title	Length
1.	"Coincidence"	3:38
2.	"Scorpio Blue"	9:36
3.	"Anatomy of Longing"	8:29
Total length:		21:43 44:14

== Personnel ==
=== Marine Intrusion ===
- Julian Priester – trombone, ARP String Ensemble
- Ron Stallings – tenor and soprano saxophones
- Ray Obiedo – electric and acoustic guitars
- Curtis Clark – piano
- Heshima Mark Williams – electric bass
- Augusta Lee Collins – drums

=== Technical personnel ===
- Manfred Eicher – producer
- Martin Wieland – recording engineer
- Robert C. Ludwig – mastering
- Frieder Grindler – design, photography
