= Moody 4B =

2010 studio album by James Moody

Studio album by James Moody
- Released: August 25, 2010
- Recorded: July 21, 2008–July 22, 2008 in New York City
- Genre: Jazz
- Length: 61:04
- Label: IPO
- Producer: Michael Patterson

James Moody chronology
Moody 4A (2009)	Moody 4B (2010)

Moody 4B is an instrumental album released by jazz musician James Moody. The album was released in 2010 on IPO Recordings, Moody's fifth release on the label, and was produced by Michael Patterson, Bill Sorin was executive producer. It won the 2011 Grammy Award for Best Jazz Instrumental Album, Individual or Group.

== Overview ==
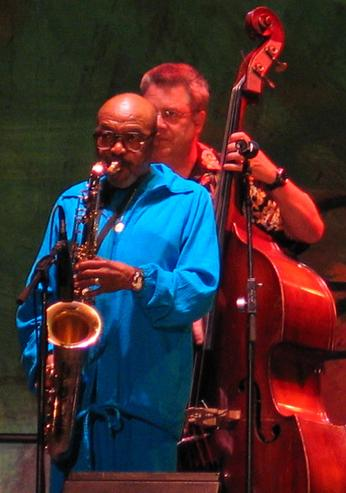
James Moody with bassist Todd Coolman in the background

Moody 4B was recorded in July 2008 in New York City. Work began one day after completion of Moody's 2009 release Moody 4A. He employed the same musicians for both recordings; pianist Kenny Barron, bassist Todd Coolman, and drummer Lewis Nash with Moody on tenor sax. The album consists of reworks of seven selections from the Great American Songbook and jazz standards plus two originals composed by Barron, "Nikara's Song", and Coolman, "O.P. Update".

This recording was a total pleasure because producer Bill Sorin let me be me, musically. So many of the previous producers of my albums wanted a "concept." Well, how about the concept being "Moody"? Bill is wonderful!!

— James Moody

In February 2011 Moody 4B won the Grammy Award for Best Jazz Instrumental Album by an Individual or Group. Moody had previously recorded over fifty solo albums and been nominated for several Grammies but the win was his first. The award was given two months after Moody died as a result of pancreatic cancer. The other nominees in the category were Positootly! by John Beasley, The New Song and Dance by The Clayton Brothers, Historicity by the Vijay Iyer Trio, and Providencia by Danilo Pérez. During the Grammy telecast Moody was featured along with other recently deceased musicians in a tribute montage.

== Reception ==
Professional ratings
Moody 4B
Review scores
Source	Rating
Allmusic	3.5/5 stars

Michael G. Nastos of Allmusic called Moody 4B a "safe concession to mainstream jazz" and that Moody "has still got it". He called Moody's sax playing "polished and graceful" and his sidemen "too good and literate to be denied high accolades".

All About Jazz published three reviews of the album by Warren Allen, Edward Blanco, and Dan Bilawsky. Allen called the album "a healthy dose of good swing by the best in the business". He called the two original numbers "sweet and catchy enough to fit seamlessly into the program" and closes by saying the recording "simply sounds like good jazz should". Blanco closed his review with "At 85 years young, James Moody keeps churning out some of the best straight ahead jazz in the business." Lastly, Bilawsky called the set "a fine edition to the catalog of one of the most enduring and important saxophonists in jazz".

Andrea Canter called the album "a monster quartet outing" in Jazz Police, going on she wrote that "each musician shines although perhaps none more than the leader".

== Track listing ==
1. "Take the A Train" (Billy Strayhorn) 4:30
2. "Hot House" (Tadd Dameron) 9:11
3. "Speak Low" (Kurt Weill, Ogden Nash) 6:27
4. "Polka Dots & Moonbeams" (Jimmy Van Heusen) 9:50
5. "I Love You" (Cole Porter) 6:45
6. "O.P. Update" (Todd Coolman) 5:18
7. "Nikara's Song" (Kenny Barron) 6:06
8. "Along Came Betty" (Benny Golson) 6:16
9. "But Not for Me" (George Gershwin, Ira Gershwin) 6:41

== Personnel ==
- James Moody – tenor saxophone
- Kenny Barron – piano
- Todd Coolman – bass
- Lewis Nash – drums

=== Production ===
- Michael Patterson – producer
- William F. Sorin – A&R, executive producer
- Jonathan Rosenberg – engineer, mastering
- Ira Gitler – liner notes
- Nick Ruechel – photography
- MaryJo Schwalbach – watercolor artwork
