= Repetition (Clifford Jordan album) =

Studio album by Clifford Jordan Quartet
- Released: 1984
- Recorded: February 9, 1984
- Studio: Classic Sound Studio, NYC
- Genre: Jazz
- Length: 40:16
- Label: Soul Note; SN 1084

Clifford Jordan chronology
Hyde Park After Dark (1981)	Repetition (1984)	Dr. Chicago (1984)

Repetition is an album by saxophonist Clifford Jordan, recorded in New York City in 1984 and released on the Italian Soul Note label.

== Reception ==
Professional ratings
Review scores
Source	Rating
AllMusic	4.5/5 stars
The Penguin Guide to Jazz Recordings	3/4 stars
The Rolling Stone Jazz Record Guide	4/5 stars

In his review on AllMusic, Ken Dryden stated that "Clifford Jordan was in top form for this marathon, noon-to-midnight quartet studio session."

== Track listing ==
All compositions by Clifford Jordan except as indicated

1. "Third Avenue" – 6:40
2. "Fun" (Clifford Jordan, Barry Harris, Walter Booker, Vernel Fournier) – 3:30
3. "Repetition" (Neal Hefti) – 6:36
4. "Evidence" (Thelonious Monk) – 4:14
5. "Nostalgia/Casbah" (Fats Navarro/Tadd Dameron) – 6:24
6. "House Call" – 5:40
7. "Quittin' Time" – 7:12

== Personnel ==
- Clifford Jordan – tenor saxophone
- Barry Harris – piano
- Walter Booker – bass
- Vernel Fournier – drums
