= People in Me =

1973 album by jazz vocalist Abbey Lincoln

Studio album by Abbey Lincoln
- Released: 1973
- Recorded: June 23, 1973
- Studio: Aoyama Victor Studio, Tokyo
- Genre: Jazz
- Length: 37:08
- Label: Philips; RJ-5100

Abbey Lincoln chronology
Straight Ahead (1961)	People in Me (1973)	Live in Misty (1973)

People in Me is an album by jazz vocalist Abbey Lincoln. It was recorded on June 23, 1973, at Aoyama Victor Studio in Tokyo, and was initially released on vinyl later that year by Philips Records. On the album, Lincoln is joined by saxophonist Dave Liebman, pianist Hiromasa Suzuki, double bassist Kunimitsu Inaba, drummer Al Foster, and conga player James Mtume. The album was issued on CD in 1989 by German label ITM, and then again in 1993 by Verve Records. It was also reissued in Germany with the title Naturally by the NewEdition label (2005).

The album, the first to extensively feature Lincoln's compositions, appeared after a hiatus of roughly twelve years, during which she wrote songs and worked on vocal training. She also toured Africa with Miriam Makeba, where she was given the names "Aminata" and "Moseka," an experience that motivated her to focus on exploring her "inner voices." She recalled: "what I discovered in Africa was that I hadn't been bastardized and ruined. Everybody knew I was an African woman; they just didn't know where to put me." According to Lincoln, the album's title track was her first original song; regarding the process of composing it, she stated: "It really relieved me of whatever anxieties I had been carrying around, and it helped me to make peace with myself."

== Reception ==
Professional ratings
Review scores
Source	Rating
AllMusic	4/5 stars
The Penguin Guide to Jazz	2/4 stars
The Rolling Stone Jazz & Blues Album Guide	2.5/5 stars
The Virgin Encyclopedia of Jazz	3/5 stars
DownBeat	4/5 stars

Writing for the New York Times, John S. Wilson described the album as "a very impressive display of Miss Lincoln's talents as a songwriter as well as a singer," and commented: "she sings with a very positive projection, particularly on her own songs, which are imaginatively phrased statements of her feelings — the search for a homeland in her haunting lyric to John Coltrane's 'Africa,' and 'People in Me,' in which she joyously shouts out the lists of the mingled bloodstreams that make up the human race."

In a review for AllMusic, Scott Yanow wrote: "Every Abbey Lincoln recording is well worth picking up for her sincerity, credibility and talent make each of her dates memorable in their own way."

The authors of The Penguin Guide to Jazz Recordings called the album "the one moment where Lincoln's unflinching self-determination founders," and stated that it "finds herself possessed by the spirits of Bessie Smith, Billie Holiday, Betty Carter and... Diana Ross; and, while there is no reason to believe that all these styles can't be subsumed and synthesized, that isn't what’s happening here."

DownBeat assigned 4 stars to the album. Reviewer Bob Henschen wrote that the album "is a substantial collection of humanistic poetry and heartfelt jazz. More improvisation might have made the session even better, but you’re left with a desire to hear more from Abbey Lincoln, both the singer and composer".

== Track listing ==
1. "You and Me Love" (Abbey Lincoln, Johnny Rotella) – 4:25
2. "Natas (Playmate)" (Abbey Lincoln) – 2:28
3. "Dorian (The Man with the Magic)" (Ronnie Mathews, Abbey Lincoln) – 4:33
4. "Africa" (John Coltrane, Abbey Lincoln) – 7:08
5. "People in Me" (Abbey Lincoln) – 4:53
6. "Living Room" (Max Roach, Abbey Lincoln) – 5:18
7. "Kohjoh-No-Tsuki (Japanese Folk Song)" (Rentarō Taki, Bansui Tsuchii, Abbey Lincoln) – 3:26
8. "Naturally" (Abbey Lincoln) – 4:39

== Personnel ==
- Abbey Lincoln – vocals
- Dave Liebman – soprano saxophone
- Hiromasa Suzuki – piano
- Kunimitsu Inaba – double bass
- Al Foster – drums
- James Mtume – congas
