= Cedar! =

Studio album by Cedar Walton
- Released: 1967
- Recorded: July 10, 1967; New York City
- Genre: Jazz
- Length: 38:04
- Label: Prestige; PR 7519
- Producer: Don Schlitten

Cedar Walton chronology
Cedar! (1967)	Spectrum (1968)

Cedar! is the debut album by pianist Cedar Walton, recorded in 1967 and released on the Prestige label.

== Reception ==
Professional ratings
Review scores
Source	Rating
The Penguin Guide to Jazz	3.5/4 stars
The Rolling Stone Jazz Record Guide	4/5 stars

Allmusic reviewed the album, stating:"Pianist Cedar Walton's debut as a leader is quite impressive.... One of the top hard bop-based pianists to emerge during the 1960s, Walton also contributed four originals to his excellent set."

== Track listing ==
All compositions by Cedar Walton except where noted.

1. "Turquoise Twice" – 7:19
2. "Twilight Waltz" – 4:20
3. "My Ship" (Ira Gershwin, Kurt Weill) – 5:34
4. "Short Stuff" – 6:25
5. "Head and Shoulders" – 4:15
6. "Come Sunday" (Duke Ellington) – 6:59
7. "Take the "A" Train" (Billy Strayhorn) – 3:29 Bonus track on CD reissue

== Personnel ==
- Cedar Walton – piano
- Kenny Dorham – trumpet (tracks 1, 2, 4 and 5–7)
- Junior Cook – tenor saxophone (tracks 1, 5 and 6)
- Leroy Vinnegar – bass
- Billy Higgins – drums

=== Production ===
- Don Schlitten – producer
- Richard Alderson – engineer
