= Philly Joe's Beat =

Studio album by Philly Joe Jones
- Released: 1960
- Recorded: May 20, 1960; NYC
- Genre: Jazz
- Length: 36:50
- Label: Atlantic; LP 1340
- Producer: Nesuhi Ertegun

Philly Joe Jones chronology
Showcase (1959)	Philly Joe's Beat (1960)	Together! (1961)

Philly Joes Beat is an album by American jazz drummer Philly Joe Jones which was released on the Atlantic label in 1960.

== Reception ==
Professional ratings
Review scores
Source	Rating
Allmusic	3/5 stars
DownBeat	4/5 stars

Allmusic gave the album 3 stars.

DownBeat assigned the album 4 stars. Reviewer Barbara Gardner wrote of Jones, "He is a brilliant percussionist, and he proves it throughout the recording . . . Jones is developing into the most dynamic, electrifying drum soloist in jazz today. This album is a milestone in that direction". She singles out "Salt Peanuts" as the high point of the album.

== Track listing ==
1. "Salt Peanuts" (Dizzy Gillespie, Kenny Clarke) - 6:13
2. "Muse Rapture" (John Hines) - 6:01
3. "Dear Old Stockholm" (Traditional) - 5:35
4. "Two Bass Hit" (Gillespie, John Lewis) - 4:33
5. "Lori" (Jimmy Garrison) - 5:21
6. "Got to Take Another Chance" (Philly Joe Jones) - 4:03
7. "That's Earl Brother" (Gillespie, Gil Fuller, Ray Brown) - 5:04

== Personnel ==
- Philly Joe Jones - drums
- Mike Downs - cornet
- Bill Barron - tenor saxophone
- Walter Davis, Jr. - piano
- Paul Chambers - bass
