= Drums Around the World =

Studio album by Philly Joe Jones
- Released: 1959
- Recorded: May 4, 11 & 28, 1959; New York City
- Genre: Jazz
- Length: 47:20
- Label: Riverside; RLP 12-302
- Producer: Orrin Keepnews

Philly Joe Jones chronology
Blues for Dracula (1958)	Drums Around the World (1959)	Showcase (1959)

Drums Around the World (subtitled Philly Joe Jones Big Band Sounds) is the second album led by American jazz drummer Philly Joe Jones. It was recorded in 1959 and released on the Riverside label.

== Reception ==
Professional ratings
Review scores
Source	Rating
AllMusic	3/5 stars
The Penguin Guide to Jazz Recordings	3/4 stars

The AllMusic review states: "There is some strong playing but this set is primarily recommended to fans of Philly Joe Jones's drum solos."

== Track listing ==
All compositions by Philly Joe Jones except as indicated

1. "Blue Gwynn" - 7:29
2. "Stablemates" (Benny Golson) - 5:56
3. "Stablemates" [alternate take] (Golson) - 4:27 Bonus track on CD reissue
4. "Carioca ('El Tambores')" (Edward Eliscu, Gus Kahn, Vincent Youmans) - 4:29
5. "The Tribal Message" [Drum Solo] - 2:51
6. "Cherokee" (Ray Noble) - 8:17
7. "Land of the Blue Veils" (Golson) - 3:38
8. "Philly J.J." (Tadd Dameron) - 10:13
- Recorded in New York City on May 4 (tracks 4, 7 & 8), May 11 (tracks 1–3 & 6) and May 28 (track 5), 1959.

== Personnel ==
- Philly Joe Jones – drums
- Blue Mitchell (tracks 1–3 & 6), Lee Morgan (tracks 1–4 & 6–8) – trumpet
- Curtis Fuller – trombone (tracks 1–4 & 6–8)
- Herbie Mann – flute, piccolo (tracks 4, 7 & 8)
- Cannonball Adderley – alto saxophone (tracks 1–4 & 6–8)
- Benny Golson – tenor saxophone (tracks 1–4 & 6–8)
- Sahib Shihab – baritone saxophone (tracks 1–4 & 6–8)
- Wynton Kelly – piano (tracks 1–4 & 6–8)
- Jimmy Garrison (tracks 4, 7 & 8), Sam Jones (tracks 1–3 & 6) – bass
