= Zoot! =

Album by Zoot Sims

Studio album by Zoot Sims
- Released: 1957
- Recorded: December 13 & 18, 1956; Reeves Sound Studios, New York City
- Genre: Jazz
- Length: 40:14
- Label: Riverside; RLP 12-228
- Producer: Orrin Keepnews

Zoot Sims chronology
Zoot Sims Plays Alto, Tenor and Baritone (1956)	Zoot! (1957)	Zoot Sims Plays 4 Altos (1957)

Zoot! (also released as Zoot Sims Quintet) is an album by American jazz saxophonist Zoot Sims featuring tracks recorded in 1956 for the Riverside label.

== Reception ==
Professional ratings
Review scores
Source	Rating
Allmusic	3/5 stars

Allmusic awarded the album 3 stars with Scott Yanow calling it "a typically hard-swinging and melodic Zoot Sims date".

== Track listing ==
All compositions by Florence Handy except as indicated

1. "Why Cry?" - 5:54
2. "Echoes of You" - 7:12
3. "Swim, Jim" - 7:07
4. "Here and Now" - 4:55
5. "Fools Rush In (Where Angels Fear to Tread)" (Rube Bloom, Johnny Mercer) - 4:30
6. "Osmosis" (Osie Johnson) - 4:44
7. "Taking a Chance on Love" (Vernon Duke, Ted Fetter, John La Touche) - 6:01

== Personnel ==
- Zoot Sims - alto saxophone, tenor saxophone
- Nick Travis - trumpet
- George Handy - piano, arranger
- Wilbur Ware - bass
- Osie Johnson - drums
