= Bearcat (album) =

Studio album by Clifford Jordan
- Released: 1962
- Recorded: December 28, 1961, January 10, 1962; New York City
- Genre: Jazz
- Length: 37:47
- Label: Jazzland; JLP 69
- Producer: Orrin Keepnews

Clifford Jordan chronology
Starting Time (1961)	Bearcat (1962)	These are My Roots: Clifford Jordan Plays Leadbelly (1965)

Bearcat is an album by jazz saxophonist Clifford Jordan which was recorded in late 1961 and early 1962 and released on the Jazzland label.

== Reception ==
Professional ratings
Review scores
Source	Rating
Down Beat	3/5 stars
Allmusic	3/5 stars
The Penguin Guide to Jazz Recordings	3.5/4 stars

Writing in the Chicago Tribune about the 1991 reissue, Jack Fuller stated: "For me hard bop is like the blues that you find at its core. I can always listen to it with pleasure. It is never monotonous, no matter how closely it hews to the norm. And when it is energetic and smiling, as it is on this reissue of a 1962 release by tenor saxophonist Clifford Jordan backed by pianist Cedar Walton, it can almost always lift my spirits, too". Scott Yanow stated in his review for Allmusic: "It would be 1973 before Jordan had another opportunity to be showcased in a quartet format, making this formerly rare set one of his best all-around recordings".

== Track listing ==
All compositions by Clifford Jordan except as indicated

1. "Bear Cat" - 4:56
2. "Dear Old Chicago" - 5:30
3. "How Deep Is the Ocean?" (Irving Berlin) - 4:58
4. "The Middle of the Block" - 4:59
5. "You Better Leave It Alone" - 5:57
6. "Malice Towards None" (Tom McIntosh) - 5:58
7. "Out-House" - 5:29

== Personnel ==
- Clifford Jordan — tenor saxophone
- Cedar Walton - piano
- Teddy Smith - bass
- J. C. Moses - drums
