= Abbey Is Blue =

Studio album by Abbey Lincoln
- Released: 1959
- Recorded: Spring and Fall, 1959; New York City
- Genre: Jazz
- Length: 39:19
- Label: Riverside; RLP 12-308
- Producer: Bill Grauer and Orrin Keepnews

Abbey Lincoln chronology
It's Magic (1958)	Abbey Is Blue (1959)	Straight Ahead (1961)

Abbey Is Blue is the fourth album by American jazz vocalist Abbey Lincoln featuring tracks recorded in 1959 for the Riverside label.

== Reception ==
Professional ratings
Review scores
Source	Rating
All About Jazz	4.5/5 stars
AllMusic	4.5/5 stars
DownBeat	5/5 stars
New York Age	1/5 stars
The Penguin Guide to Jazz Recordings	3.5/4 stars
PopMatters	9/10 stars
The Rolling Stone Jazz Record Guide	5/5 stars
The Virgin Encyclopedia of Jazz	4/5 stars

AllMusic awarded the album 4½ stars, with the review by Scott Yanow stating: "Abbey Lincoln is quite emotional and distinctive during a particularly strong set... very memorable". All About Jazz also gave the album 4½ stars, with David Rickert calling it "a breakthrough performance in jazz singing", and observing: "With the civil rights movement looming over the horizon, no longer did singers need to stick with standards and Tin Pan Alley tunes and could truly sing about subjects that mattered to them. Lincoln picked up Billie Holiday's skill at inhabiting the lyrics of a song and projecting its emotional content outward, and these songs, all of which deal with sorrow, are stark and harrowing accounts of loss and injustice." Chris Ingalls of PopMatters commented: "The choice of compositions is consistently interesting... and stands apart from so much of the music released during this time... Lincoln was intent on infusing the album with elements of civil rights issues so important to her then and throughout the rest of her life, and it doesn't hurt that her vocals on these standards absolutely soar with emotion and deft technique."

== Track listing ==
1. "Afro Blue" (Mongo Santamaría, Oscar Brown) - 3:20
2. "Lonely House" (Langston Hughes, Kurt Weill) - 3:40
3. "Let Up" (Abbey Lincoln) - 5:32
4. "Thursday's Child" (Elisse Boyd, Murray Grand) - 3:31
5. "Brother, Where Are You?" (Oscar Brown) - 3:10
6. "Laugh, Clown, Laugh" (Ted Fio Rito, Sam M. Lewis, Joe Young) - 5:24
7. "Come Sunday" (Duke Ellington) - 5:13
8. "Softly, as in a Morning Sunrise" (Oscar Hammerstein II, Sigmund Romberg) - 2:46
9. "Lost in the Stars" (Maxwell Anderson, Kurt Weill) - 4:11
10. "Long as You're Living" (Oscar Brown, Julian Priester, Tommy Turrentine) - 2:33

== Personnel ==
- Abbey Lincoln - vocals
- Kenny Dorham (tracks 2, 4, 7–9), Tommy Turrentine (tracks 1, 3, 6, 10) - trumpet
- Julian Priester - trombone (tracks 1, 3, 6, 10)
- Stanley Turrentine - tenor saxophone (tracks 1, 3, 6, 10)
- Les Spann - guitar (tracks 2, 4, 7–9), flute (track 5)
- Wynton Kelly (tracks 2, 4, 5), Cedar Walton (tracks 3, 6), Phil Wright (tracks 7–9) - piano
- Bobby Boswell (tracks 1, 3, 6, 10), Sam Jones (tracks 2, 4, 5, 7–9) - bass
- Philly Joe Jones (tracks: 2, 4, 5, 7–9), Max Roach (tracks: 1, 3, 6, 10) - drums
