= Blues for Dracula =

Studio album by Philly Joe Jones
- Released: 1958
- Recorded: September 17, 1958; New York City
- Genre: Jazz
- Length: 42:31
- Label: Riverside; RLP 12-282
- Producer: Orrin Keepnews

Philly Joe Jones chronology
Blues for Dracula (1958)	Drums Around the World (1959)

Blues for Dracula is the debut album by American jazz drummer Philly Joe Jones which was recorded in 1958 for the Riverside label.

== Reception ==
Professional ratings
Review scores
Source	Rating
AllMusic	3.5/5 stars
The Rolling Stone Jazz Record Guide	3/5 stars
The Penguin Guide to Jazz Recordings	3/4 stars

The Allmusic review by Scott Yanow described it as a "worthwhile but not overly essential release". It features Jones's vocal impersonation of Bela Lugosi. The album "became an instant classic thanks to the title track."

== Track listing ==
1. "Blues for Dracula" (Johnny Griffin) - 8:11
2. "Trick Street" (Owen Marshall) - 3:47
3. "Fiesta" (Cal Massey) - 10:25
4. "Tune-Up" (Miles Davis) - 8:00
5. "Ow!" (Dizzy Gillespie) - 12:08

== Personnel ==
- Philly Joe Jones - drums, narrator
- Nat Adderley - cornet
- Julian Priester - trombone
- Johnny Griffin - tenor saxophone
- Tommy Flanagan - piano
- Jimmy Garrison - bass
