= Masters from Different Worlds =

Studio album by Clifford Jordan and Ran Blake featuring Julian Priester
- Released: March 1, 1994
- Recorded: December 26–30, 1989
- Venue: Mapleshade Studios, Upper Marlboro, MD
- Genre: Jazz
- Length: 67:27
- Label: Mapleshade MS 01732
- Producer: Fred Kaplan, Pierre Sprey

Clifford Jordan chronology
Blue Head (1990)	Masters from Different Worlds (1994)	Four Play (1990)

Ran Blake chronology
You Stepped Out of a Cloud (1989)	Masters from Different Worlds (1989)	That Certain Feeling (1991)

Masters from Different Worlds is an album by saxophonist Clifford Jordan and pianist Ran Blake with trombonist Julian Priester which was recorded in 1989 and released on the Mapleshade label in 1994.

Professional ratings
Review scores
Source	Rating
AllMusic	3/5 stars
The Penguin Guide to Jazz Recordings	3.5/4 stars

== Track listing ==
No.	Title	Writer(s)	Length
1.	"Something to Live For"	Duke Ellington, Billy Strayhorn	9:34
2.	"A Touch of Evil"	Ran Blake	10:37
3.	"Arline"	Blake	9:25
4.	"Laura"	David Raksin, Johnny Mercer	2:49
5.	"Short Life of Barbara Monk"	Blake	8:04
6.	"Vanguard"	Blake	9:00
7.	"Julia"	John Lennon, Paul McCartney	4:14
8.	"Wives and Lovers"	Burt Bacharach, Hal David	4:45
9.	"Doug's Prelude"	Clifford Jordan	6:16
10.	"Mood Indigo"	Ellington, Barney Bigard, Irving Mills	2:43
Total length:			67:27

== Personnel ==
- Clifford Jordan – tenor saxophone, soprano saxophone (tracks 1–3, 6, 8 & 9)
- Ran Blake – piano
- Julian Priester – trombone (tracks 2, 3 & 5)
- Windmill Saxophone Quartet: (tracks 2 & 8)
  - Jesse Meman – alto saxophone
  - Tom Monroe, Ken Plant – tenor saxophone
  - Clayton Englar – baritone saxophone
- Steve Williams – drums (tracks 2, 4, 5 & 10)
- Alfredo Mojica – congas (track 2)
- Claudia Polley – vocals (track 5 & 8)
