= The Rotterdam Session =

Studio album by Philly Joe Jones, James Long and Clifford Jordan
- Released: 1985
- Recorded: April 18, 1985
- Studio: Audio Daddio
- Genre: Jazz
- Label: Audio Daddio (RS 1013)
- Producer: Mark Lewis

Clifford Jordan chronology
| Two Tenor Winner (1984) | The Rotterdam Session (1985) | Royal Ballads (1986) |

The Rotterdam Session is a studio album by American jazz saxophonist Clifford Jordan recorded together with Philly Joe Jones on drums and James Long on bass in the Netherlands in 1985. This album is a rare Dutch session from the trio and one of the last recordings including Philly Joe Jones before his death in August 1985.

== Track listing ==
| No. | Title | Writer(s) | Length |
|---|---|---|---|
| 1. | "D.B. Blues" | Clarence Beaks, Lester Young | 8:30 |
| 2. | "Presidential Suite 1st Movement" | Jordan | 4:45 |
| 3. | "Presidential Suite 2nd Movement" | Jordan | 7:30 |
| 4. | "Miss Brown Calling" | Jordan | 5:08 |
| 5. | "Whispering Grass" | Doris Fisher, Fred Fisher | 6:58 |
| 6. | "Soul Fountain" | Jordan | 10:37 |

== Personnel ==
- Clifford Jordan – tenor saxophone
- Philly Joe Jones – drums
- James Long – bass
