= Blue Head =

Live album by David "Fathead" Newman Quartet plus Clifford Jordan
- Released: 1990
- Recorded: September 3, 1989
- Venue: Riverside Park Arts Festival, New York City
- Genre: Jazz
- Length: 73:25
- Label: Candid; CCD79041
- Producer: Mark Morganelli

David "Fathead" Newman chronology
Fire! Live at the Village Vanguard (1989)	Blue Head (1990)	Blue Greens & Beans (1990)

Clifford Jordan chronology
Live at Ethell's (1990)	Blue Head (1990)	Masters from Different Worlds (1990)

Blue Head is a live album by American saxophonist David "Fathead" Newman's Quartet plus Clifford Jordan recorded at the 5th Annual Riverside Park Arts Festival in 1989 and released on the Candid label.

== Reception ==
Professional ratings
Review scores
Source	Rating
AllMusic	4/5 stars

In his review for AllMusic, Scott Yanow states "The distinctive tenors David Newman and Clifford Jordan make for a potent team on this live jam session set which finds Jordan sitting in with Newman's quartet ... The six performances each clock in between 11 and 15 minutes with plenty of stretching out for the two veteran saxophonists ... Easily recommended to straightahead jazz fans".

== Track listing ==
1. "Strike Up the Band" (George Gershwin, Ira Gershwin) – 11:10
2. "Blue Head" (David "Fathead" Newman) – 14:13
3. "Willow Weep for Me" (Ann Ronell) – 12:59
4. "Blues for David" (Buddy Montgomery) – 12:07
5. "What's New?" (Bob Haggart, Johnny Burke) – 11:50
6. "Eye Witness Blues" (Clifford Jordan) – 11:16

== Personnel ==
- David "Fathead" Newman – alto saxophone, tenor saxophone, flute
- Clifford Jordan – tenor saxophone, soprano saxophone
- Ted Dunbar – guitar
- Charles "Buddy" Montgomery – piano
- Todd Coolman – bass
- Marvin "Smitty" Smith – drums
