= Spellbound (Clifford Jordan album) =

Studio album by Clifford Jordan
- Released: 1960
- Recorded: August 10, 1960; New York City
- Genre: Jazz
- Length: 39:55
- Label: Riverside; RLP 340
- Producer: Cannonball Adderley

Clifford Jordan chronology
| Cliff Craft (1957) | Spellbound (1960) | A Story Tale (1961) |

Spellbound is an album by jazz saxophonist Clifford Jordan which was recorded in 1960 and released on the Riverside label.

== Reception ==
Professional ratings
Review scores
| Source | Rating |
|---|---|
| Allmusic | 4/5 stars |
| The Penguin Guide to Jazz Recordings | 4/4 stars |
| DownBeat | 4/5 stars |

The Allmusic site awarded the album 4 stars with the review by Scott Yanow stating, "At this point, Jordan did not quite have the distinctive sound that he would develop in his period with Charles Mingus, but he was already a strong hard bop stylist... It's an excellent straight-ahead outing"

DpwnBeat reviewer Frank Kofsky awarded the album 4 stars. Kofsky found a heavy influence of Sonny Rollins in Jordan's playing.

== Track listing ==
All compositions by Clifford Jordan except as indicated

1. "Toy" - 4:25
2. "Lush Life" (Billy Strayhorn) - 5:15
3. "Moon-A-Tic" - 4:41
4. "Spellbound" - 5:54
5. "Hot Water" - 5:06
6. "Last Night When We Were Young" (Harold Arlen, Yip Harburg) - 6:30
7. "Au Privave" (Charlie Parker) - 8:31

== Personnel ==
- Clifford Jordan — tenor saxophone
- Cedar Walton - piano
- Spanky DeBrest - bass
- Albert Heath - drums
