= Cliff Craft =

Studio album by Cliff Jordan
- Released: 1958
- Recorded: November 10, 1957
- Studio: Van Gelder Studio; Hackensack, NJ
- Genre: Jazz
- Length: 43:18
- Label: Blue Note; BLP 1582
- Producer: Alfred Lion

Clifford Jordan chronology
Jenkins, Jordan and Timmons (1957)	Cliff Craft (1958)	Spellbound (1960)

Cliff Craft is an album by American jazz saxophonist Clifford Jordan recorded on November 10, 1957 and released on Blue Note the following year.

== Reception ==
Professional ratings
Review scores
Source	Rating
AllMusic	4/5 stars
The Penguin Guide to Jazz Recordings	3/4 stars

The AllMusic review by Lee Bloom calling Cliff Craft a "wonderfully relaxed recording, which dates from a very fertile period of the renowned jazz label's history".

== Track listing ==
All tracks are written by Cliff Jordan, except as noted.

Side 1
No.	Title	Length
1.	"Laconia"	7:06
2.	"Soul-Lo Blues"	8:29
3.	"Cliff Craft"	6:30

Side 2
No.	Title	Writer(s)	Length
1.	"Confirmation"	Charlie Parker	7:34
2.	"Sophisticated Lady"	Duke Ellington; Irving Mills; Mitchell Parish	6:46
3.	"Anthropology"	Dizzy Gillespie; Parker	7:03

== Personnel ==
=== Musicians ===
- Clifford Jordan – tenor saxophone
- Art Farmer – trumpet (except "Sophisticated Lady")
- Sonny Clark – piano
- George Tucker – bass
- Louis Hayes – drums

=== Technical personnel ===
- Alfred Lion – producer
- Rudy Van Gelder – recording engineer
- Reid Miles – design
- Francis Wolff – photography
- Robert Levin – liner notes
