= Newport Rebels =

Studio album by Jazz Artists Guild
- Released: 1961
- Recorded: November 1 & 11, 1960
- Studio: Nola Penthouse Studios in NYC
- Genre: Jazz
- Length: 39:34
- Label: Candid CJM-8022/CJS-9022
- Producer: Bob d'Orleans

Charles Mingus chronology
Mingus (1961)	Newport Rebels (1961)	Oh Yeah (1962)

Newport Rebels is an album by various artists released under the Jazz Artists Guild, led by bassist Charles Mingus and drummer Max Roach, that was recorded in November 1960 and released on the Candid label.

== Background ==
Though the album is a standard studio album, the recording and group resulted from the 1960 Cliff Walk Manor (or C.W.M.) concert, aka Newport Rebels festival, aka "the protest festival" and sometimes known as the "Rump Festival", organized by Charles Mingus and Max Roach as a protest against the exploitation of the Newport Jazz Festival.

The regular 1960 Newport Jazz Festival was shut down by violent riotingof drunken youths, while Mingus and Roach's alternative festival happened without incident.

Nat Hentoff's liner notes explain the background situation of the album and festival:

The one positive accomplishment of the 1960 Newport Festival was the creation in rebellion of a musicians' festival at Cliff Walk Manor. As the 'official' rites were ending because of ugly rioting in the streets several hundred people were listening in calm and pleasure to the rebels at Cliff Walk. The dissidents had been organized by Charles Mingus and Max Roach in protest against the accelerating commercialization of the annual Ben-Hur-with-a-horn production of Freebody Park. It was exhilarating for the musicians involved to realize that for once in their careers, they were capable of formulating and sustaining their own ground rules without booking agents, impressarios, and other middlemen. The rebels set up their own tents for sleeping quarters, even stitching the canvas themselves; handled advertising and promotion; alternated as announcers of the rebels; and took tickets. (Mr. Mingus roamed the grounds besides, asking for payment from freeloaders outside the fence) [...].

== Reception ==
Professional ratings
Review scores
Source	Rating
AllMusic	3/5 stars
DownBeat	2.5/5 stars

The contemporaneous DownBeat reviewer commented: "One of the non-insignificant faults of this album is a looseness that induces sloppy playing", and identified Jones as the main culprit. AllMusic reviewer Scott Yanow states: "In 1960 bassist Charles Mingus helped to organize an alternative Newport Jazz Festival in protest of Newport's conservative and increasingly commercial booking policy. The music on this LP (which has been reissued on CD) features some of the musicians who participated in Mingus's worthy if short-lived venture".

== Track listing ==
1. "Mysterious Blues" (Charles Mingus) – 8:35
2. "Cliff Walk" (Booker Little) – 9:37
3. "Wrap Your Troubles In Dreams" (Harry Barris) – 3:47
4. "Tain't Nobody's Bizness If I Do" (Everett Robbins, Porter Grainger) – 7:11
5. "Me and You" (Charles Mingus, Jo Jones, Roy Eldridge, Tommy Flanagan) – 9:46

== Personnel ==
- Roy Eldridge (tracks 1, 3 & 5), Booker Little (track 2), Benny Bailey (track 4) – trumpet
- Jimmy Knepper (track 1), Julian Priester (track 2) – trombone
- Eric Dolphy – alto saxophone (tracks 1 & 4)
- Walter Benton – tenor saxophone (track 2)
- Tommy Flanagan (tracks 1, 3 & 5), Kenny Dorham (track 4) – piano
- Charles Mingus (tracks 1, 3 & 5), Peck Morrison (tracks 2 & 4) – bass
- Jo Jones (all tracks), Max Roach (track 2) – drums
- Abbey Lincoln – vocals (track 4)
