= Ph.D. (Art Farmer album) =

Studio album by Art Farmer
- Released: 1989
- Recorded: April 3–4, 1989; New York City
- Genre: Jazz
- Length: 52:38
- Labels: Contemporary; C 14055
- Producer: Helen Keane

Art Farmer chronology
Blame It on My Youth (1988)	Ph.D. (1989)	Central Avenue Reunion (1989)

Ph.D. is an album by Art Farmer recorded in New York in 1989 and originally released on the Contemporary label.

== Reception ==
Professional ratings
Review scores
Source	Rating
Allmusic	4.5/5 stars
The Penguin Guide to Jazz Recordings	4/4 stars

Scott Yanow of Allmusic said "The advanced hard bop music has enough unpredictable moments to hold one's interest".

== Track listing ==
All compositions by James Williams except as indicated

1. "Ph.D." – 8:09
2. "Affaire d'Amour" (Donald Brown) – 6:42
3. "Mr. Day's Dream" – 6:02
4. "The Summary" (Thad Jones) – 6:10
5. "Blue Wail" (Kenny Drew) – 8:31
6. "Like Someone in Love" (Johnny Burke, Jimmy van Heusen) – 6:42
7. "Rise to the Occasion" – 6:13
8. "Ballade Art" (Clifford Jordan) – 4:37

== Personnel ==
- Art Farmer – flugelhorn, trumpet
- Clifford Jordan – tenor saxophone
- James Williams – piano
- Kenny Burrell – guitar
- Rufus Reid – bass
- Marvin "Smitty" Smith – drums
