= A Story Tale =

Studio album by Clifford Jordan and Sonny Red
- Released: 1961
- Recorded: February 14, 1961
- Studio: Bell Sound (New York City)
- Genre: Jazz
- Label: Jazzland; JLP 40
- Producer: Orrin Keepnews

Clifford Jordan chronology
Spellbound (1960)	A Story Tale (1961)	Starting Time (1961)

Sonny Red chronology
Breezing (1960)	A Story Tale (1961)	The Mode (1961)

Professional ratings
Review scores
Source	Rating
Allmusic	3/5 stars

A Story Tale is an album by jazz saxophonists Clifford Jordan and Sonny Red which was recorded in 1961 and released on the Jazzland label.

== Track listing ==
All compositions by Clifford Jordan except as indicated

1. "Cumberland Court" - 3:40
2. "A Story Tale" - 4:48
3. "You're Driving Me Crazy" (Walter Donaldson) - 5:39
4. "Defiance" (Sonny Red) - 3:23
5. "Prints" (Red) - 6:03
6. "Hip Pockets" (Jordan, Red) - 5:00
7. "They Say It's Wonderful" (Irving Berlin) - 5:12
8. "If I Didn't Care" (Jack Lawrence) - 5:13

== Personnel ==
- Clifford Jordan - tenor saxophone
- Sonny Red - alto saxophone
- Tommy Flanagan (tracks 1–5), Ronnie Mathews (tracks 6–8) - piano
- Art Davis - bass
- Elvin Jones - drums
