= Take the "A" Train =

"Take the 'A' Train"

Song by Billy Strayhorn
- Written: 1939
- Published: 1941 by Tempo Music
- Genre: Jazz standard
- Composer: Billy Strayhorn
- Lyricists: Lee Gaines (1942); Joya Sherrill (1944)

"Take the 'A' Train" is a jazz standard by Billy Strayhorn that was the signature tune of the Duke Ellington orchestra.

In 1976, the 1941 recording by Duke Ellington on Victor Records was inducted into the Grammy Hall of Fame.

== History ==
"Take The 'A' Train"

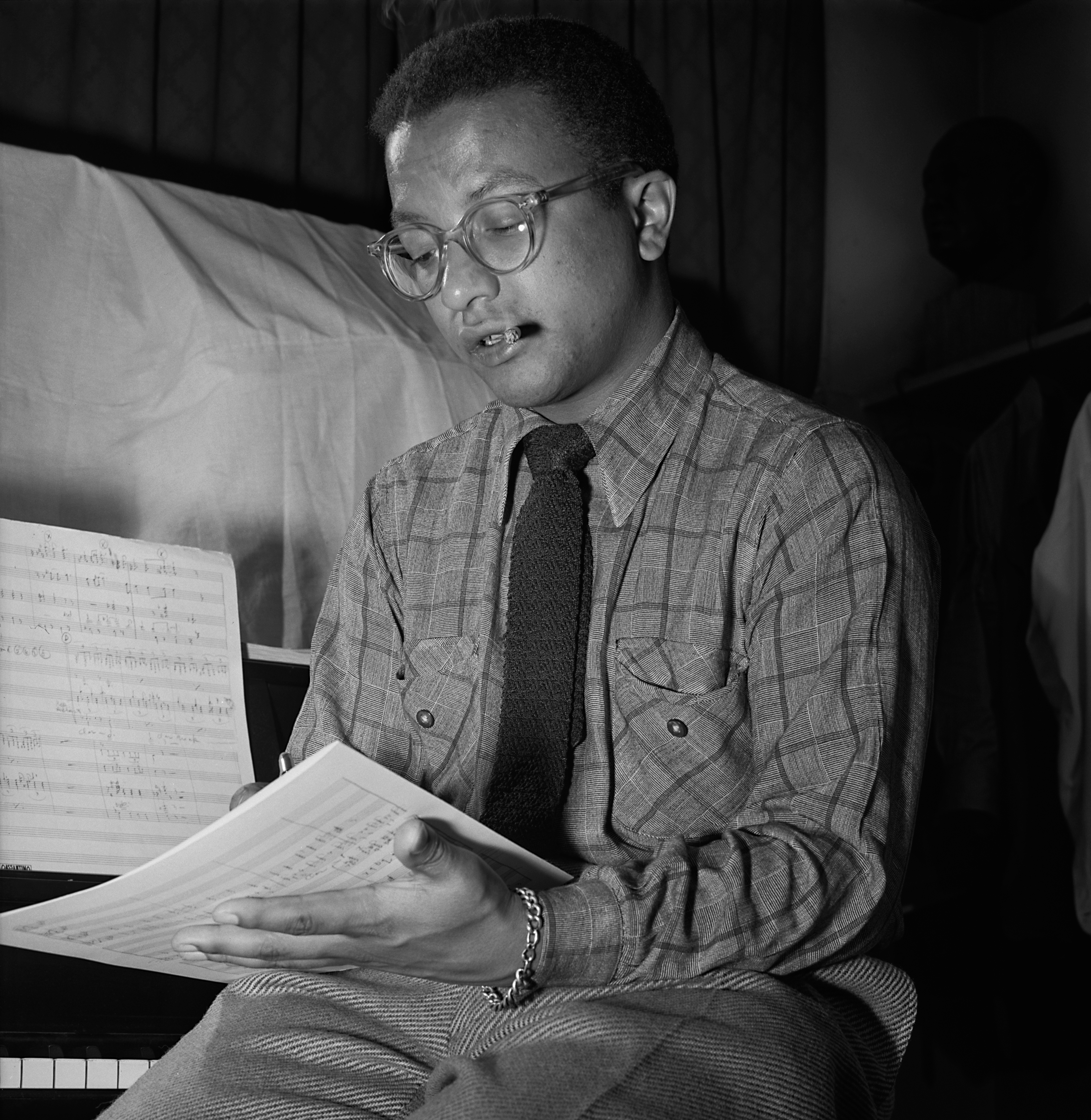
Billy Strayhorn, circa 1946

The use of the Strayhorn composition as the signature tune was made necessary by a ruling in 1940 by the American Society of Composers, Authors and Publishers (ASCAP). When ASCAP raised its licensing fees for broadcast use, many ASCAP members, including Ellington, could no longer play their compositions over radio, as most music was played live on radio at the time. Ellington turned to Billy Strayhorn and son Mercer Ellington, who were registered with ASCAP's competitor BMI, to "write a whole new book for the band," Mercer recalled. "'A' Train" was one of many tunes written by Strayhorn, and was picked to replace "Sepia Panorama" as the band's signature song. Mercer recalled that he found the composition in a trash can after Strayhorn discarded a draft of it because it sounded too much like a Fletcher Henderson arrangement. The song was first recorded on January 15, 1941, as a standard transcription for radio broadcast. The first (and most famous) commercial recording was made on February 15, 1941.

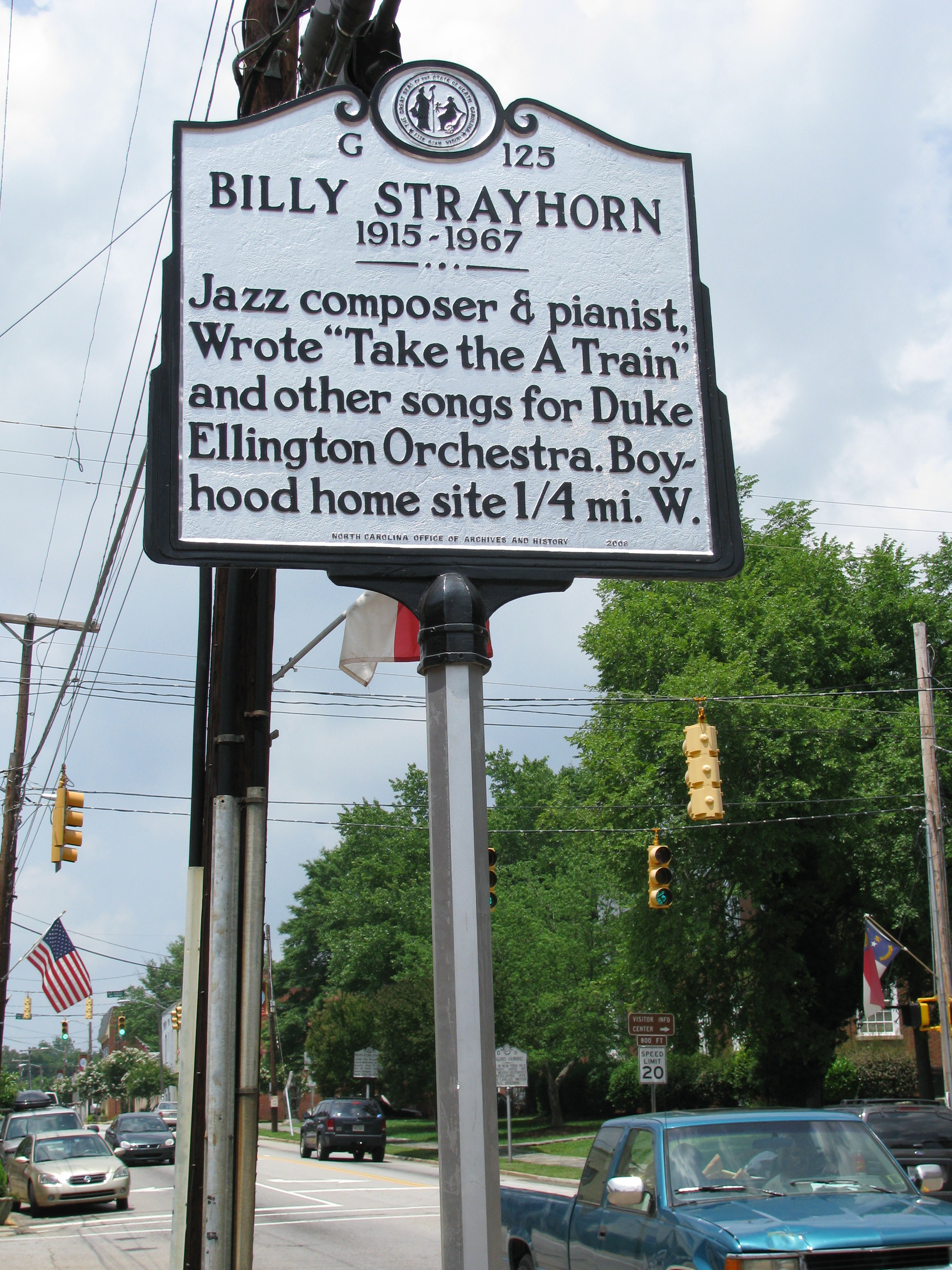
Commemorative sign near Strayhorn's childhood home in Hillsborough, North Carolina

"Take the 'A' Train" was composed in 1939, after Ellington offered Strayhorn a job in his organization and gave him money to travel from Pittsburgh to New York City. Ellington wrote directions for Strayhorn to get to his house by subway. The directions began with the words "Take the A Train", referring to the then-new A subway service that runs through New York City, which at that time ran from eastern Brooklyn, on the Fulton Street Line opened in 1936, up into Harlem and northern Manhattan, using the Eighth Avenue Line in Manhattan opened in 1932.

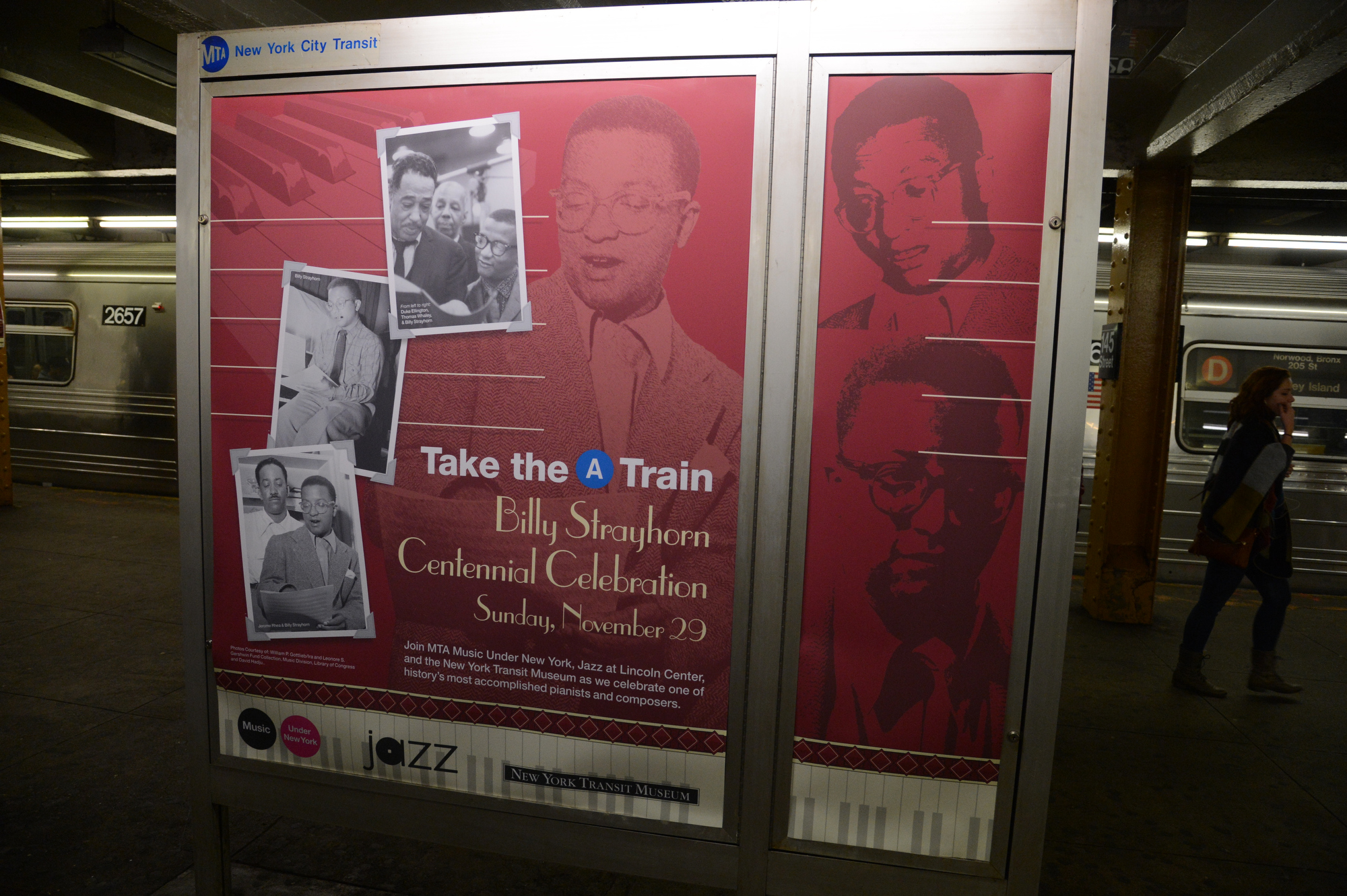
A pop-up jazz concert was held in 2015 aboard the A train to mark the 100th anniversary of the birth of Strayhorn, on a vintage subway car between 145th St and 59th St–Columbus Circle.

Strayhorn was a great fan of Fletcher Henderson's arrangements. "One day, I was thinking about his style, the way he wrote for trumpets, trombones and saxophones, and I thought I would try something like that", Strayhorn recalled in Stanley Dance's The World of Duke Ellington.

Although Strayhorn said he wrote lyrics for it, the recorded first lyrics were composed by, or for, the Delta Rhythm Boys. The lyrics used by the Ellington band were added by Joya Sherrill, who was 20 at the time (1944). She made up the words at her home in Detroit, while the song played on the radio. Her father, a noted Detroit activist, set up a meeting with Ellington. Owing to Joya's remarkable poise and singing ability and her unique take on the song, Ellington hired her as a vocalist and adopted her lyrics. The vocalist who most often performed the song with the Ellington band was trumpeter Ray Nance, who enhanced the lyrics with numerous choruses of scat singing. Nance is also responsible for the trumpet solo on the first recording, which was so well suited for the song that it has often been duplicated note for note by others.

The song was performed by Ellington and the band in the 1943 film Reveille with Beverly with vocalist Betty Roché. The band is depicted performing in a railroad passenger car, not a subway car.

Based loosely on the chordal structure of "Exactly Like You", the song combines the propulsive swing of the 1940s-era Ellington band with the confident sophistication of Ellington and the black elite who inhabited Sugar Hill in Harlem. The tune is in AABA form, in the key of C, with each section being a lyric couplet. (The Ellington band's version begins in C and rises to the key of E♭ after the second chorus.)

Ella Fitzgerald sang and recorded this song many times from 1957 onwards, including with Ellington and orchestra. A live version with Fitzgerald scatting is on her 1961 Verve release Ella in Hollywood.

The Midwestern rock band Chicago added their version in 1995 on their back-to-the-roots-disc, Night & Day Big Band.

Jo Stafford recorded an intentionally inept interpretation of the song under the pseudonym Darlene Edwards.

The tune, in a version taken from Duke Ellington and his orchestra's 1941 album Hollywood, was included in the soundtrack of the 2008 video game Grand Theft Auto IV from the fictitious in-game jazz music radio station "JNR 108.5 (Jazz Nation Radio)".

The song was the theme song of the Voice of America Jazz Hour, heard worldwide on shortwave radio, for many years.

The song is mentioned in the 2005 musical In the Heights in the opening song, "In the Heights."

== Awards and honors ==
In 1999, National Public Radio included this song in the "NPR 100", in which NPR's music editors sought to compile the one hundred most important American musical works of the 20th century. In June 2026, CBS News included the song in its list of the 250 essential American songs of the past 250 years.

== Other recordings ==
- Duke Ellington – Hollywood (1941)
- Delta Rhythm Boys in a Soundie (1942)
- Bob Wills and His Texas Playboys – The Tiffany Transcriptions (1947)
- Duke Ellington – Ellington Uptown (1952), vocal version with Betty Roché
- Clifford Brown with Max Roach – Study in Brown (1955)
- Ella Fitzgerald – Ella Fitzgerald Sings the Duke Ellington Song Book (1957)
- Anita O'Day – Anita O'Day Sings the Winners (1958)
- Johnny Dankworth – London to Newport (1959)
- Billy Strayhorn – The Peaceful Side of Billy Strayhorn
- Charles Mingus – Pre-Bird (1961)
- Sun Ra – Piano Recital (1977)
- Joe Henderson – Lush Life (1991)
- Chicago – Night & Day: Big Band (1995)
- Dave Grusin – Homage to Duke (1993)
- Herman Brood – Back on the Corner (1999)
- Tina May – Tina May – Live in Paris (2000)
- Nikki Yanofsky – Nikki (2010)
- Lost Weekend – Harbor Lights and Cowboy Blues (2001)
- James Moody – Moody 4B (2010)

== See also ==
- List of train songs
- A-Train
