= Blame It on My Youth (Art Farmer album) =

Studio album by Art Farmer Quintet
- Released: 1988
- Recorded: February 4 & 8, 1988; New York City
- Genre: Jazz
- Length: 47:32
- Label: Contemporary; C-14042
- Producer: Helen Keane

Art Farmer chronology
Something to Live For: The Music of Billy Strayhorn (1987)	Blame It on My Youth (1988)	Ph.D. (1989)

Blame It on My Youth is an album by Art Farmer's Quintet recorded in New York in 1988 and originally released on the Contemporary label.

== Reception ==
Professional ratings
Review scores
Source	Rating
AllMusic	4.5/5 stars
The Penguin Guide to Jazz	👑

Scott Yanow of AllMusic called it "one of the better Art Farmer recordings of the 1980s, which is saying a great deal, for the flugelhornist is among the most consistent of all jazz musicians... It's an enjoyable and very successful outing". In addition to a maximum four-star rating, The Penguin Guide to Jazz awarded the album a "Crown" signifying a recording that the authors "feel a special admiration or affection for".

== Track listing ==
1. "Blame It on My Youth" (Edward Heyman, Oscar Levant) - 7:05
2. "Fairy Tale Countryside" (Fritz Pauer) - 9:46
3. "The Smile of the Snake" (Donald Brown) - 6:01
4. "Third Avenue" (Clifford Jordan) - 8:16
5. "Summer Serenade" (Benny Carter) - 6:16
6. "Progress Report" (James Williams) - 4:32
7. "I'll Be Around" (Alec Wilder) - 5:04

== Personnel ==
- Art Farmer - flugelhorn
- Clifford Jordan - tenor saxophone, soprano saxophone
- James Williams - piano
- Rufus Reid - bass
- Victor Lewis - drums
