= Astral Weeks (Charles Mingus album) =

Live album by Charles Mingus
- Released: 1993
- Recorded: April 14, 1964
- Venue: Copenhagen
- Genre: Jazz
- Label: Moon

Astral Weeks is an unauthorized bootleg album of Charles Mingus' music, released by Moon Records in Italy on vinyl and CD in 1990. The material was recorded live in Copenhagen, on April 14, 1964,

The release contains only two tracks: "Fables of Faubus" and "Meditations", although the full performance of his group's music that day also included other compositions that are absent from the Moon releases.

The bootleg was named after the Van Morrison album Astral Weeks.

== Personnel ==
- Charles Mingus – bass
- Eric Dolphy – alto saxophone, flute, bass clarinet
- Clifford Jordan – tenor saxophone
- Jaki Byard – piano
- Johnny Coles – trumpet
- Dannie Richmond – drums
