= Jimmy Bennington =

American drummer

James Arnold Bennington
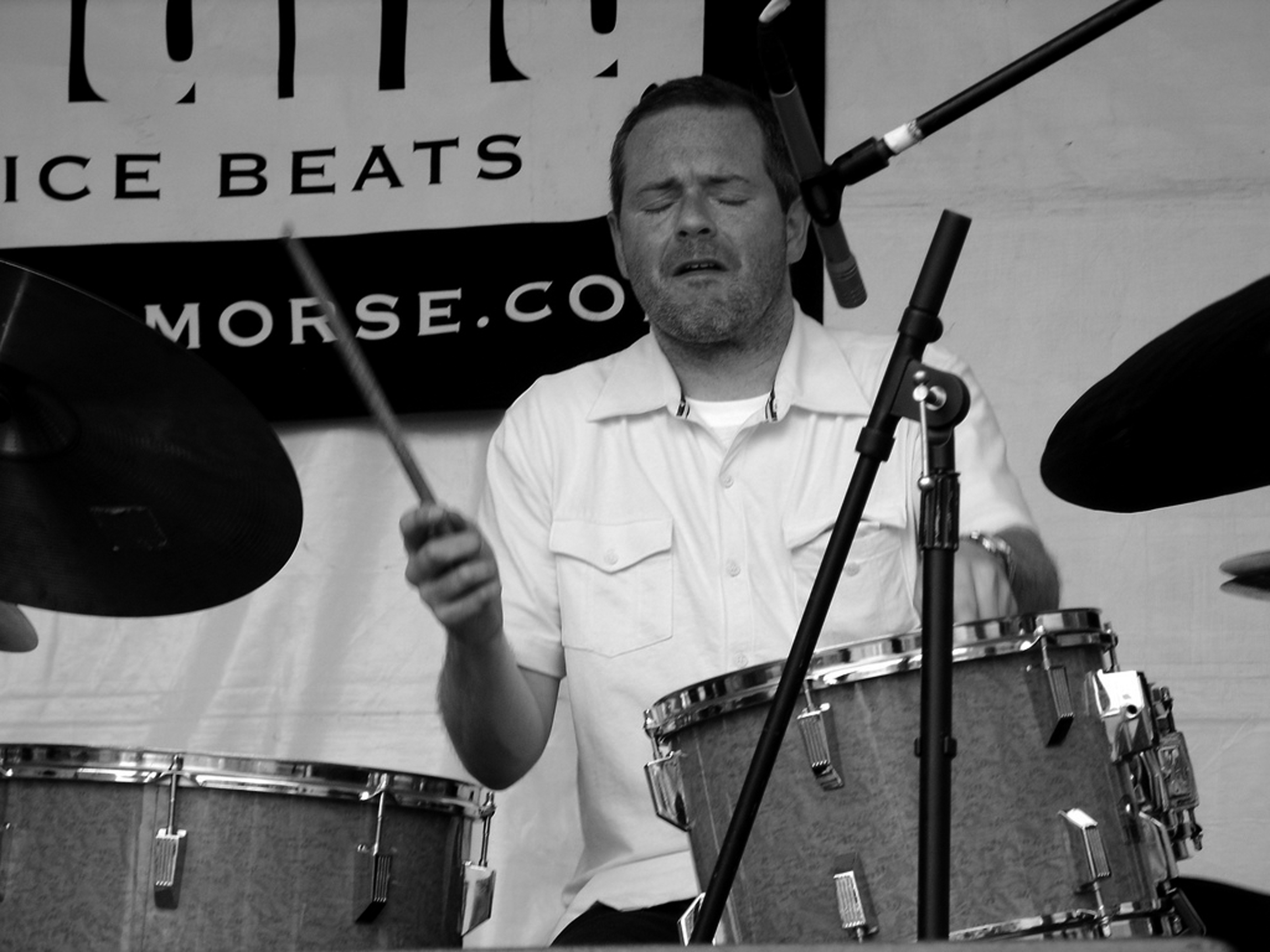
- James Arnold Bennington

Background information
- Born: May 22, 1970 (age 56)
- Genres: Jazz, Avant-garde
- Instrument: Drums
- Years active: 25
- Label: SLAM/ Cadence Jazz/ CIMP/ CIMPoL/ Unseen Rain/ OA2/ ThatSwan!
- Website: www.jbcolourandsound.com

James Arnold Bennington (born May 22, 1970 in Columbus, Ohio) is an American jazz drummer and avant-garde musician based in Chicago, Illinois.

== Biography ==
Born in Columbus, Ohio, in 1970, James Bennington lived in Detroit, Michigan until 1978 when he relocated to Houston, Texas. He began music studies on clarinet while attending Elementary School before switching to drums at age thirteen. Bennington's experience has come from private study, marching and concert bands both middle and high school, work as a sideman, and as a band leader with his group, Colour and Sound.

Early musical experiences include participation in several jazz and blues sessions in Texas throughout the late 1980s and early 1990s. Bennington studied with Elvin Jones for ten years beginning in 1993 and served as band manager / drum tech from 2000–2002 on tours in the U.S. and Europe.

Active in Texas 1990-1998, the West Coast from 1998-2006, moved to Chicago 2006–present. Bennington has performed throughout the U.S., Canada, Europe, and South America. He has played and recorded in the jazz and improvised music communities for over 35 years. He has been an active contributor to the music scene playing and recording with Perry Robinson (Clarinetist), Joe Lovano (Saxophonist), Daniel Carter (Saxophonist), Ed Schuller (Bassist), Brian Smith (Bassist), Fredrick Jackson Jr. (AACM Saxophonist), Samuel Hasting (guitarist), Jim Baker (piano), Mike W Harmon (bassist), Steve Cohn (Pianist), Dustin Laurenzi (Saxophonist), and Artie Black (Saxophonist) among many others.

Notably, Bennington has been a featured performer at the 30th Annual Chicago Jazz Festival, Fred Anderson's Velvet Lounge, and the Tampon-Galerie in Paris, France in 2008, Joe's Pub in NYC 2025, WKCR NYC 2025. Bennington is endorsed by Dream Cymbals and Gongs, Inc. and is featured in the books ['Herbie Nichols; A Jazzists Life'] by Mark Miller and ['Dreaming Drums'] by Christian Ducasse

== Recordings ==
- Contemplation, (1998) Jimmy Bennington, Liner notes by Delfeayo Marsalis, ThatSwan! Records 1000
- Midnight Choir, (2003) Jimmy Bennington, OA2 Records 22007
- Our Dialogue, Live at the Tugboat, vol. V (2004) Jimmy Bennington/ David Haney, CD/DVD, ThatSwan! Records 1003
- "Jazz Kaleidoscope; solo drums live (2005), Jimmy Bennington, ThatSwan! Records 1004
- "Portraits and Silhouettes" (2005) Jimmy Bennington/ Julian Priester, ThatSwan! Records 1005
- Another Friend; The Music Of Herbie Nichols (2005), Jimmy Bennington Trio w David Haney/ Michael Bisio, ThatSwan! Records 1006
- "The Spirits at Belle's" (2009) Jimmy Bennington/ Perry Robinson Quartet, Cadence Jazz Records 1219
- "Symbols Strings and Magic" (2010) Jimmy Bennington Trio w Perry Robinson/ Ed Schuller CIMP Records 379
- "No Lunch in Hackensack" (2010) Jimmy Bennington/ Steve Cohn, Unseen Rain Records 9979
- "One More Beautiful Ballad" (2011) Jimmy Bennington Trio w Daniel Carter/ Ed Schuller CIMP Records
- "Sad Drums/ BItter Drums: Ballad for Sierra Leone" Jimmy Bennington/ Seth Paynter, ThatSwan!sing#001
- "The Walk to Montreuil" (2013) Jimmy Bennington Trio w Benjamin Duboc/ Jobic LeMasson, Cadence Jazz Records
- "Exotic Coda" (2014) Jimmy Bennington/ Demian Richardson Trio w Ken Filiano, CIMP Records
- "Tear it Down, Then Play a Ballad" (2015) Jimmy Bennington Colour and Sound w Daniel Carter/ Brian Smith, ThatSwan!sing#002
- "Albany Park" (2018) Jimmy Bennington/ Steve Cohn, SLAM Records LC05526
- "A Little While in Chicago" (2018) Jimmy Bennington Colour and Sound w Fred Jackson Jr./ Jerome Croswell/ Ed Schuller, CIMP 417
- "Boom! Live at the Bop Shop" (2018) Jimmy Bennington Colour and Sound w Fred Jackson Jr./ Jerome Croswell/ Ed Schuller, CIMPoL 5043
- "New Jersey Freebie" (2019) Jimmy Bennington/ Steve Cohn/ Ed Schuller, SLAM 596
- "Live at Andy's" (2020) Jimmy Bennington Colour and Sound w Fred Jackson Jr./Dustin Laurenzi/ Artie Black/ Mike Harmon, ThatSwan!1009
- "Everlasting Belle" (2021) Jimmy Bennington Colour and Sound w Dustin Laurenzi, Artie Black, James Cook, Davi Priest, ThatSwan! 1010
- "Out in the Taiga at Night (2020) SVOBODNI w Phil Hunger, ThatSwan!
- "Mercenary Blues" (2021) SVOBODNI II w Phil Hunger, Brian Seyler, Davi Priest, ThatSwan! 1011
- "Churchbells - Live at the Greenmill (2022) w Fred Jackson Jr./Dustin Laurenzi/ Artie Black/ Mike Harmon, Cadence Jazz Records 1270
- "The Return to Catalhoyuk" (2024) SVOBODNI III w Phil Hunger, Brian Seyler, Daniel Thatcher, Matthew Jennings, ThatSwan! 1012
- "Blue Veils and Bright Stars" (2025) w Jimmy Bennington, Paul Blaney, Julian Priester, ThatSwan! 1013
- "New York Jazz Stories at the Public Theater (2025) w David Haney, Joe Lovano, Judi Silvano, Cheryl Pyle, Adam Lane
