= Something to Live For: The Music of Billy Strayhorn =

Studio album by Art Farmer
- Released: 1987
- Recorded: January 14–15, 1987; New York City
- Genre: Jazz
- Length: 38:42
- Labels: Contemporary; C 14029
- Producer: Helen Keane

Art Farmer chronology
Real Time (1986)	Something to Live For: The Music of Billy Strayhorn (1987)	Blame It on My Youth (1988)

Something to Live For: The Music of Billy Strayhorn is an album by Art Farmer recorded in New York in 1987 and originally released on the Contemporary label.

== Reception ==
Professional ratings
Review scores
Source	Rating
Allmusic	4/5 stars
The Penguin Guide to Jazz Recordings	4/4 stars

Scott Yanow of Allmusic said "This very logical set is a real gem... Farmer brings the right combination of sensitivity, swing, respect for the melody, and creativity to these renditions and the results are quite memorable".

== Track listing ==
All compositions by Billy Strayhorn except as indicated

1. "Isfahan" (Duke Ellington, Billy Strayhorn) - 7:25
2. "Blood Count" - 6:08
3. "Johnny Come Lately" - 5:39
4. "Something to Live For" (Ellington, Strayhorn) - 6:07
5. "Upper Manhattan Medical Group" - 7:07
6. "Rain Check" - 6:44
7. "Day Dream" (Ellington, Strayhorn, John La Touche) - 5:12 Bonus track on CD

== Personnel ==
- Art Farmer - flugelhorn
- Clifford Jordan - tenor saxophone
- James Williams - piano
- Rufus Reid - bass
- Marvin "Smitty" Smith - drums
