= Clifford Jordan =

American jazz saxophonist (1931–1993)

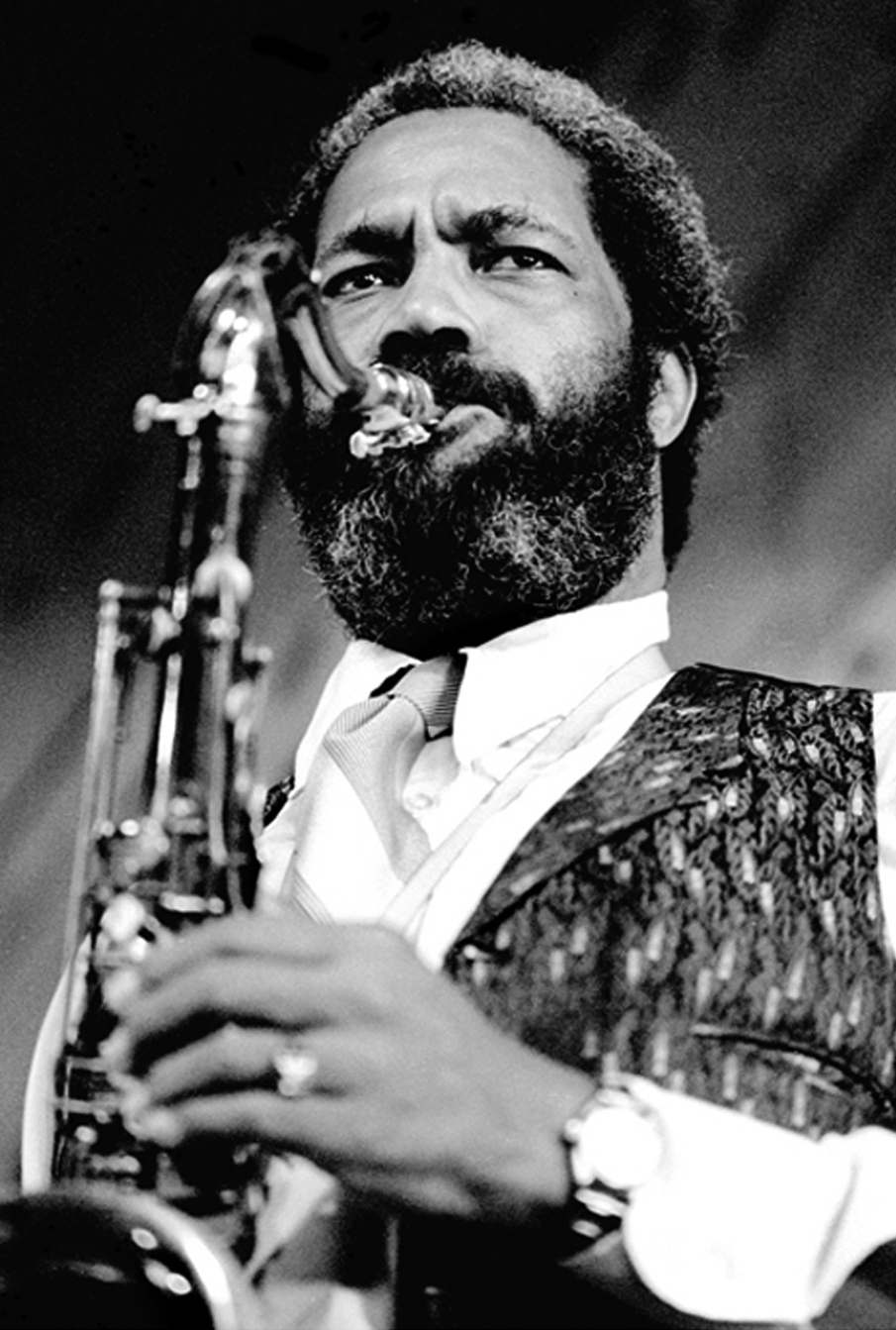
- Jordan performing with Barry Harris in 1980

Background information
- Born: Clifford Laconia Jordan Jr. September 2, 1931; Chicago, Illinois, U.S.
- Died: March 27, 1993 (aged 61) New York City, New York, U.S.
- Genres: Jazz
- Occupation: Musician
- Instrument: Saxophone
- Labels: Blue Note, New Jazz, Riverside, Jazzland, Atlantic, Vortex, Strata-East, SteepleChase, Muse, Eastworld, Bee Hive, Soul Note, Criss Cross, Mapleshade, Milestone

Clifford Laconia Jordan (September 2, 1931 – March 27, 1993) was an American jazz tenor saxophone player and composer. Originally from Chicago, Jordan later moved to New York City, where he recorded extensively in addition to touring across both Europe and Africa. He recorded and performed with Art Farmer, Horace Silver, Max Roach, J.J. Johnson, and Kenny Dorham, among others. In later years, he performed with Cedar Walton's quartet Eastern Rebellion, and led his own groups, including a big band.

== Early life and career ==
Jordan took music lessons from a young age, originally playing piano and later taking up the saxophone at age 13. Jordan attended DuSable High School, where his classmates included John Gilmore and Johnny Griffin. He originally got his start leading a dance band before breaking into the rhythm and blues scene, as well as playing bebop with the likes of Max Roach and Sonny Stitt.

== New York City and touring ==
After moving to New York City in 1957, Jordan recorded three albums for Blue Note Records, the first of which, Blowing in from Chicago featured Horace Silver and Art Blakey as well as his former schoolmate Gilmore as co-leader. A series of notable collaborations followed - Jordan joined Silver's band, co-led a group with Kenny Dorham, and recorded as a sideman with J.J Johnson, Lee Morgan, Eric Dolphy, and Joe Zawinul, to name a few. In 1960, Jordan began performing with Cedar Walton, a collaboration that would continue for the remainder of Jordan's career.

Jordan re-joined Eric Dolphy in 1964 as part of the Charles Mingus Sextet, which toured Europe and produced a number of live albums. Jordan later toured Africa with Randy Weston for the US State Department. Jordan briefly moved to Belgium in 1969, and during this time he frequently performed in Paris.

== Return to New York and later career ==
Jordan moved back to New York City in late 1969, signing a deal with Strata East Records to record a trio of albums that mostly featured Jordan's own compositions. The last of these, Drink Plenty Water, was recorded in 1974 but remained unreleased until 2023. The album features spoken-word from actor David Smyrl and singing from Jordan, as well as a small vocal ensemble which included Jordan's daughter, Donna.

Jordan would continue to record prolifically throughout the 1970s and 1980s, with his ambitious Strata East projects contrasted by more straight-ahead offerings, such as the 1981 offering Hyde Park After Dark, which saw him return to his Chicago roots, playing hard bop with a group that included Norman Simmons, Victor Sproles, and Cy Touff. He also rekindled his collaboration with Art Farmer around this time, afterwards playing as a sideman on several of Farmer's albums.

In the early 1990s, Jordan began leading a big band in New York City, which would become a regular act at Eddie Condon's.

== Personal life ==
Jordan was married to Shirley Jordan, a designer and former owner of The Clothes Gallery in New York. He later married Sandy Jordan (née Williams), a graphic artist and Honorary Founders Board member of the Jazz Foundation of America. Jordan died of lung cancer at the age of 61 in New York City. He was survived by a daughter, Donna Jewell Harris, (née Jordan), and a son, Eric Jordan.

== Discography ==
=== As leader/co-leader ===
- 1957: Blowing In from Chicago with John Gilmore (Blue Note, 1957)
- 1957: Cliff Jordan (Blue Note, 1957)
- 1957: Jenkins, Jordan and Timmons with John Jenkins and Bobby Timmons (New Jazz, 1957)
- 1957: Cliff Craft (Blue Note, 1958)
- 1960: Spellbound (Riverside, 1960)
- 1961: A Story Tale with Sonny Red (Jazzland, 1961)
- 1961: Starting Time (Jazzland, 1961)
- 1961–1962: Bearcat (Jazzland, 1962)
- 1965: These are My Roots: Clifford Jordan Plays Leadbelly (Atlantic, 1965)
- 1966: Soul Fountain (Vortex, 1970)
- 1969: In the World (Strata-East, 1972)
- 1973: Glass Bead Games (Strata-East, 1974)
- 1974: Half Note (SteepleChase, 1985)
- 1974: Drink Plenty Water (Harvest Song, 2023)
- 1975: Night of the Mark VII (Muse, 1975)
- 1975: On Stage Vol. 1 (SteepleChase, 1977)
- 1975: On Stage Vol. 2 (SteepleChase, 1978)
- 1975: On Stage Vol. 3 (SteepleChase, 1979)
- 1975: Firm Roots (SteepleChase, 1975)
- 1975: The Highest Mountain (SteepleChase, 1975)
- 1976: Remembering Me-Me (Muse, 1977)
- 1977: Inward Fire (Muse, 1978)
- 1978: The Adventurer (Muse, 1980)
- 1978: Hello, Hank Jones (Eastworld, 1978)
- 1981: Hyde Park After Dark (Bee Hive, 1981)
- 1984: Repetition (Soul Note, 1984)
- 1984: Dr. Chicago (Bee Hive, 1985)
- 1984: Two Tenor Winner with Junior Cook (Criss Cross, 1985)
- 1985: The Rotterdam Session with Philly Joe Jones and James Long (Audio Daddio, 1985)
- 1986: Royal Ballads (Criss Cross, 1987)
- 1987: Live at Ethell's (Mapleshade, 1990)
- 1989: Blue Head with David "Fathead" Newman (Candid, 1990)
- 1989: Masters from Different Worlds with Ran Blake (Mapleshade, 1994)
- 1990?: Four Play with Richard Davis, James Williams & Ronnie Burrage (DIW, 1990)
- 1990: Play What You Feel (Mapleshade, 1997)
- 1989-1991: The Mellow Side of Clifford Jordan (Mapleshade, 1997)
- 1991: Down Through the Years (Milestone, 1992)

=== As sideman ===
With Richard Davis

- Epistrophy & Now's the Time (Muse, 1972)
- Dealin' (Muse, 1974) – rec. 1973

With Eric Dolphy

- Conversations (FM, 1963) – rec. 1963
- Iron Man (Douglas International, 1968) – rec. 1963

With Art Farmer

- Mirage (Soul Note, 1982)
- You Make Me Smile (Soul Note, 1986) – rec. 1984
- Something to Live For: The Music of Billy Strayhorn (Contemporary, 1987)
- Blame It on My Youth (Contemporary, 1988)
- Ph.D. (Contemporary, 1989)
- Live at Sweet Basil (Evidence, 1994) – rec. 1992

With Carmen McRae

- Any Old Time (Denon, 1986)
- Carmen Sings Monk (Novus, 1990) – rec. 1988

With Charles Mingus

- Town Hall Concert (Jazz Workshop, 1964)
- Right Now: Live at the Jazz Workshop (Fantasy, 1964)
- The Great Concert of Charles Mingus (America, 1971) – rec. 1964
- Mingus in Europe Volume I (Enja, 1980) – rec. 1964
- Mingus in Europe Volume II (Enja, 1980) – rec. 1964
- Astral Weeks (Moon, 1993) – rec. 1964
- Revenge! (Revenge, 1996) – rec. 1964
- Charles Mingus Sextet with Eric Dolphy Cornell 1964 (Blue Note, 2007) – rec. 1964

With Mingus Dynasty

- Live at the Theatre Boulogne-Billancourt/Paris, Vol. 1 (Soul Note, 1988)
- Live at the Theatre Boulogne-Billancourt/Paris, Vol. 2 (Soul Note, 1988)

With Lee Morgan

- Here's Lee Morgan (Vee-Jay, 1960)
- Expoobident (Vee-Jay, 1960)
- Take Twelve (Jazzland, 1962)

With Max Roach

- Percussion Bitter Sweet (Impulse!, 1961)
- It's Time (Impulse!, 1962)
- Speak, Brother, Speak! (Fantasy, 1962)

With Cedar Walton

- Spectrum (Prestige, 1968)
- The Electric Boogaloo Song (Prestige, 1969)
- A Night at Boomers, Vol. 1 (Muse, 1973)
- A Night at Boomers, Vol. 2 (Muse, 1973)
- The Pentagon (East Wind, 1976)

With others

- Paul Chambers, Paul Chambers Quintet (Blue Note, 1957)
- Sonny Clark, Sonny Clark Quintets (Blue Note, 1957) – the three tracks with Clifford Jordan reissued on My Conception, 2008 CD
- Dameronia, Live at the Theatre Boulogne-Billancourt Paris (Soul Note, 1994) – rec. 1989
- Dizzy Gillespie, To Bird with Love (Telarc, 1992)
- Slide Hampton, Roots (Criss Cross, 1985)
- John Hicks and Elise Wood, Luminous (Nilva, 1985)
- Andrew Hill, Shades (Soul Note, 1987)
- J. J. Johnson, J.J. Inc. (Columbia, 1960)
- Charles McPherson, Con Alma! (Prestige, 1965)
- Pony Poindexter, Pony's Express (Epic, 1962)
- Freddie Redd, Lonely City (Uptown, 1989)
- Dizzy Reece, Manhattan Project (Bee Hive, 1978)
- Sahib Shihab, The Jazz We Heard Last Summer (Savoy, 1957)
- Horace Silver, Further Explorations (Blue Note, 1958)
- Charles Tolliver, Music Inc. (Strata-East, 1971)
- Mal Waldron, What It Is (Enja, 1982)
- Joe Zawinul, Money in the Pocket (Atlantic, 1966)
