= Junior Mance Special =

Studio album / Live album by Junior Mance
- Released: 1989
- Recorded: September 14, 1986, and November 30, 1988, Cherry Beach Sound and Cafe des Copains, Toronto, Canada
- Genre: Jazz
- Length: 59:47
- Label: Sackville; SKCD 2-3043
- Producer: John Norris and Bill Smith

Junior Mance chronology
Truckin' and Trakin' (1983)	Junior Mance Special (1989)	Here 'Tis (1992)

Junior Mance Special is a solo album by jazz pianist Junior Mance recorded in the studio and live and released on the Sackville label in 1989.

== Reception ==
Professional ratings
Review scores
Source	Rating
Allmusic	4/5 stars
The Penguin Guide to Jazz Recordings	3/4 stars

The Allmusic site awarded the album 4 stars, noting: "While he's best at blues-tinged material, Mance shows the versatility necessary to do other material and doesn't substitute clichés and gimmicks for ideas and substance".

== Track listing ==
1. "Yancey Special" (Meade Lux Lewis, Andy Razaf) - 5:15
2. "Careless Love (Traditional) - 6:54
3. "If You Could See Me Now" (Tadd Dameron, Carl Sigman) - 3:50
4. "I Wish I Knew How It Would Feel to Be Free" (Billy Taylor) - 6:03
5. "Since I Lost My Baby I Almost Lost My Mind" (Ivory Joe Hunter) - 6:18
6. "I Got It Bad (And That Ain't Good)" (Duke Ellington, Paul Francis Webster) - 5:54
7. "In a Sentimental Mood" (Ellington, Manny Kurtz, Irving Mills) - 6:21
8. "Blue Monk" (Thelonious Monk) - 6:45
9. "Whisper Not" (Benny Golson) - 7:14
10. "Flat on Your Face" (Junior Mance) - 5:08
- Recorded at Cherry Beach Sound in Toronto, Canada on September 14, 1986 (tracks 1–5), and Cafe des Copains, Toronto, Canada on November 30, 1988 (tracks 6–10)

== Personnel ==
- Junior Mance - piano
