= The Midnight Show (album) =

Live album by The Eddie "Lockjaw" Davis and Johnny Griffin Quintet
- Released: 1964
- Recorded: January 6, 1961; Minton's Playhouse, New York City
- Genre: Jazz
- Label: Prestige; PRLP 7330
- Producer: Esmond Edwards

Eddie "Lockjaw" Davis chronology
The Late Show (1961)	The Midnight Show (1964)	Lookin' at Monk! (1961)

Johnny Griffin chronology
The Late Show (1961)	The Midnight Show (1961)	Lookin' at Monk! (1961)

Professional ratings
Review scores
Source	Rating
Allmusic	4.5/5 stars
The Rolling Stone Jazz Record Guide	4/5 stars

The Midnight Show is a live album by saxophonists Eddie "Lockjaw" Davis and Johnny Griffin recorded at Minton's Playhouse in 1961 and released on the Prestige label in 1964. The album was the third release from the recordings at Minton's after The Tenor Scene and The First Set.

== Track listing ==
1. "In Walked Bud" (Thelonious Monk) - 6:14
2. "Land of Dreams" (Norman Gimbel, Eddie Heywood) - 7:52
3. "Beano" (John Campbell) - 6:42
4. "Robbins Nest" (Illinois Jacquet, Bob Russell, Sir Charles Thompson) - 10:12
5. "Our Delight" (Tadd Dameron) - 7:17
6. "Theme" (Traditional) - 1:03

== Personnel ==
- Eddie "Lockjaw" Davis, Johnny Griffin - tenor saxophone
- Junior Mance - piano
- Larry Gales - bass
- Ben Riley - drums
