= For Dancers Only =

Studio album by Junior Mance and Martin Rivera
- Released: 1983
- Recorded: July 3, 1983
- Studio: McClear Place Studios, Toronto, Canada
- Genre: Jazz
- Length: 43:37
- Label: Sackville; 3031
- Producer: John Norris and Bill Smith

Junior Mance chronology
The Tender Touch of Junior Mance and Martin Rivera (1983)	For Dancers Only (1983)	Truckin' and Trakin' (1983)

For Dancers Only is an album by jazz pianist Junior Mance and bassist Martin Rivera that was released on the Sackville label in 1983. Though the front cover credits the album to Junior Mance and Martin Rivera, the spine and disc label both credit it to Junior Mance alone, and the liner notes characterize Rivera as a sideman.

== Reception ==
Professional ratings
Review scores
Source	Rating
Allmusic	4/5 stars
The Penguin Guide to Jazz Recordings	4/4 stars

Allmusic reviewer Scott Yanow described the album as "Accessible yet creative music, recommended to a wide audience".

== Track listing ==
1. "Harlem Lullaby" (Junior Mance) - 7:10
2. "Girl of My Dreams" (Sunny Clapp) - 4:17
3. "Prelude to a Kiss" (Duke Ellington, Irving Gordon, Irving Mills) - 4:45
4. "Come on Home" (Horace Silver) - 5:51
5. "For Dancers Only" (Sy Oliver, Don Raye, Vic Schoen) - 4:55
6. "Run 'Em Around" (Mance) - 4:43
7. "Summertime" (George Gershwin, DuBose Heyward) - 11:56

== Personnel ==
- Junior Mance - piano
- Martin Rivera - bass
