= The Late Show (Eddie "Lockjaw" Davis album) =

Live album by The Eddie "Lockjaw" Davis and Johnny Griffin Quintet
- Released: 1965
- Recorded: January 6, 1961
- Venue: Minton's Playhouse, New York City
- Genre: Jazz
- Label: Prestige; PRLP 7357
- Producer: Esmond Edwards

Eddie "Lockjaw" Davis chronology
The Tenor Scene (1961)	The Late Show (1965)	The Midnight Show (1961)

Johnny Griffin chronology
The Tenor Scene (1961)	The Late Show (1961)	The Midnight Show (1961)

Professional ratings
Review scores
Source	Rating
Allmusic	3/5 stars
The Rolling Stone Jazz Record Guide	4/5 stars

The Late Show is a live album by saxophonists Eddie "Lockjaw" Davis and Johnny Griffin recorded at Minton's Playhouse in 1961 and released on the Prestige label in 1965. The album was the fourth release from the recordings at Minton's after The Tenor Scene, The First Set and The Midnight Show.

== Reception ==
The Allmusic site awarded the album 3 stars.

== Track listing ==
1. "Dee Dee's Dance" (Denzil Best) - 6:12
2. "Billie's Bounce" (Charlie Parker) - 8:43
3. "Epistrophy" (Thelonious Monk, Kenny Clarke) - 8:46
4. "Light and Lovely" (Eddie "Lockjaw" Davis, George Duvivier) - 11:33

== Personnel ==
- Eddie "Lockjaw" Davis, Johnny Griffin - tenor saxophone
- Junior Mance - piano
- Larry Gales - bass
- Ben Riley - drums
