= Night Hawk (album) =

Studio album by Coleman Hawkins with Eddie "Lockjaw" Davis
- Released: 1961
- Recorded: December 30, 1960
- Studio: Van Gelder, Englewood Cliffs, New Jersey
- Genre: Jazz
- Length: 40:40
- Label: Swingville; SVLP 2016
- Producer: Esmond Edwards

Coleman Hawkins chronology
The Hawk Swings (1960)	Night Hawk (1961)	Jazz Reunion (1961)

Eddie "Lockjaw" Davis chronology
Griff & Lock (1960)	Night Hawk (1960)	The First Set (1961)

Night Hawk is an album by saxophonists Coleman Hawkins with Eddie "Lockjaw" Davis, recorded at the end of 1960 and released on the Swingville label.

== Reception ==
Professional ratings
Review scores
Source	Rating
AllMusic	4/5 stars
DownBeat	4/5 stars
The Penguin Guide to Jazz Recordings	3/4 stars
The Rolling Stone Jazz Record Guide	4/5 stars

The contemporaneous DownBeat reviewer picked Hawkins' performance on "There Is No Greater Love" as the highlight, stating: "his fine sense of form and rhythmic construction [...] are exceptional, even for him". The AllMusic site awarded the album 4 stars, stating: "Hawkins was one of the main inspirations of his fellow tenor Eddie "Lockjaw" Davis, so it was logical that they would one day meet up in the recording studio. This CD has many fine moments from these two highly competitive jazzmen".

== Track listing ==
1. "Night Hawk" (Coleman Hawkins) – 10:30
2. "There Is No Greater Love" (Isham Jones, Marty Symes) – 8:15
3. "In a Mellow Tone" (Duke Ellington, Milt Gabler) – 6:45
4. "Don't Take Your Love from Me" (Henry Nemo) – 8:35
5. "Pedalin'" (Ken McIntyre) – 6:35

== Personnel ==
- Coleman Hawkins, Eddie "Lockjaw" Davis – tenor saxophone
- Tommy Flanagan – piano
- Ron Carter – bass
- Gus Johnson – drums
