= Here 'Tis (Junior Mance album) =

Studio album by Junior Mance Quintet
- Released: 1992
- Recorded: January 14 & 16, 1992; Toronto, Canada
- Genre: Jazz
- Length: 61:27
- Labels: Sackville; SKCD 2-3043
- Producer: John Norris

Junior Mance chronology
Junior Mance Special (1986-88)	Here 'Tis (1992)	Blue Mance (1994)

Here 'Tis (subtitled The Junior Mance Quintet Play the Music of Dizzy Gillespie) is an album by jazz pianist Junior Mance's Quintet featuring compositions associated with Dizzy Gillespie. It was recorded in 1992 and released on the Sackville label.

== Reception ==
Professional ratings
Review scores
Source	Rating
AllMusic	4/5 stars
The Penguin Guide to Jazz Recordings	3/4 stars

The Globe and Mail wrote that Mance "shows more than the blues-based style that has dominated his work lately; his solo version of 'Tunesia' sustains the CD's light mood but also reveals a side of the composition that's rarely, if ever, heard."

== Track listing ==
All compositions by Dizzy Gillespie except where noted.

1. "Here 'Tis" - 8:02
2. "Woody 'n' You" - 6:16
3. "Ow" - 9:51
4. "Con Alma" - 4:51
5. "Tour de Force" - 5:48
6. "Tin Tin Deo" (Chano Pozo, Gil Fuller) - 9:44
7. "I Waited for You" (Gillespie, Fuller) - 7:03
8. "Blue 'n' Boogie" (Gillespie, Frank Paparelli) - 6:15
9. "A Night in Tunisia" (Gillespie, Paparelli) - 3:33
- Recorded in Toronto, Canada, on January 14, 1992 (tracks 2–5, 7 & 8), and January 16, 1992 (tracks 1, 6 & 9)

== Personnel ==
- Junior Mance – piano
- Bill McBirnie – flute (tracks 1–3, 6 & 8)
- Reg Schwager – guitar (tracks 1–3, 6 & 8)
- Kieran Overs – bass (tracks 1–8)
- Norman Marshall Villeneuve – drums (tracks 1–8)
