= Stuart Broomer =

Canadian editor, music critic, pianist, writer, jazz historian and composer

Stuart Broomer is a Canadian editor, music critic, pianist, writer, jazz historian, and composer. He is a former editor with CODA magazine and currently works as an editor at Coach House Books. As a music critic he has written articles for Amazon.com, The Globe and Mail, Toronto Life, Down Beat, Musicworks, Cadence Magazine, ParisTransatlantlic and Signal to Noise. He has also authored more than 60 liner essays for musicians internationally. His book Time and Anthony Braxton (ISBN 978-1551281445) was published by The Mercury Press in 2009. He is a member of the music faculty at George Brown College.

Broomer is a graduate of The Royal Conservatory of Music where he studied music composition and piano with Samuel Dolin. As a pianist, he is best known for playing in the jazz trio "Broomer, Mars & Smith" in the 1970s and later the duo "Stuart Broomer & John Mars" during the 1980s, both of which included compositions by Broomer in their repertoire. The duo released a 1983 album, Annihilated Surprise, on Ugly Dog Records.

He is the father of video essayist Stephen Broomer.
