= Visitation (Joe McPhee album) =

Studio album by Joe McPhee with the Bill Smith Ensemble
- Released: 1985
- Recorded: November 6, 1983, at McClear Palace Studios, Toronto
- Genre: Jazz
- Length: 43:31
- Label: Sackville 3036
- Producer: Bill Smith

Joe McPhee chronology
Oleo (1981)	Visitation (1985)	Songs and Dances (1987)

Alternative cover

Visitation is an album by multi-instrumentalist and composer Joe McPhee, recorded in 1983 and first released on the Canadian Sackville label, it was rereleased on CD in 2003.

== Reception ==
Professional ratings
Review scores
Source	Rating
Allmusic	4.5/5 stars
The Penguin Guide to Jazz Recordings	3/4 stars

Allmusic reviewer Scott Yanow states "The interplay between these masterful improvisers on group originals and Albert Ayler's classic "Ghosts" is consistently impressive and worthy of a close investigation by the more open-eared segment of the jazz audience".

== Track listing ==
All compositions by Joe McPhee except as indicated

1. "Exuma" - 4:23
2. "Eleuthera" - 10:21
3. "Home at Last" (Bill Smith) - 7:14
4. "Ghosts" (Albert Ayler) - 7:22
5. "If I Don't Fall" (David Prentice) - 5:47
6. "A-Configuration" (Smith) - 8:24

== Personnel ==
- Joe McPhee - tenor saxophone, soprano saxophone, pocket trumpet, flugelhorn
- Bill Smith - soprano saxophone, sopranino saxophone, alto saxophone
- David Prentice - violin
- David Lee - bass
- Richard Barnard - drums
