= Big Chief! =

Studio album by Junior Mance
- Released: 1961
- Recorded: August 1, 1961
- Studio: Plaza Sound Studios, New York City
- Genre: Jazz
- Label: Jazzland; JLP 53
- Producer: Orrin Keepnews

Junior Mance chronology
Junior Mance Trio at the Village Vanguard (1961)	Big Chief! (1961)	The Soul of Hollywood (1962)

Big Chief! is an album by jazz pianist Junior Mance which was recorded in 1961 and released on the Jazzland label.

Professional ratings
Review scores
Source	Rating
AllMusic	3/5 stars

== Track listing ==
All compositions by Junior Mance except where noted.

1. "Big Chief!" – 4:18
2. "Love for Sale" (Cole Porter) – 4:58
3. "The Seasons" (Sara Cassey) – 3:30
4. "Fillet of Soul" (Larry Gales) – 4:32
5. "Swish" – 3:44
6. "Summertime" (George Gershwin, DuBose Heyward) – 4:15
7. "Ruby, My Dear" (Thelonious Monk) – 6:03
8. "Little Miss Gail" – 4:50
9. "Atlanta Blues" (W. C. Handy) – 5:52

== Personnel ==
- Junior Mance – piano
- Jimmy Rowser – bass
- Paul Gussman – drums
