= I Believe to My Soul =

I Believe to My Soul may refer to:

- "I Believe to My Soul" (song), a song by Ray Charles
- I Believe to My Soul (album), an album by Junior Mance
- I Believe to My Soul - The Best of 1977-2003, a compilation album by Joe Camilleri
