= Seven Dials =

Seven Dials may refer to:

- Seven Dials, Brighton, a junction of seven roads in the Prestonville area of Brighton, England, United Kingdom
- Seven Dials, London, a junction of seven roads in the Covent Garden area of London, England, United Kingdom
  - Seven Dials Jazz Club, a jazz venue located in the Covent Garden area
  - The Seven Dials Mystery, a murder mystery by Agatha Christie set in the Covent Garden area
    - Agatha Christie's Seven Dials, a 2026 television adaptation of Christie's novel
  - The Duchess of Seven Dials, a 1920 silent film set in the Covent Garden area
- "Seven Dials" (2point4 Children), episode 33 in series 5 (1995) of the BBC TV series 2point4 Children
- Seven Dials, a non-fiction imprint of Orion Publishing Group
