= Bobby Thomas (musician) =

American drummer (1932–2013)

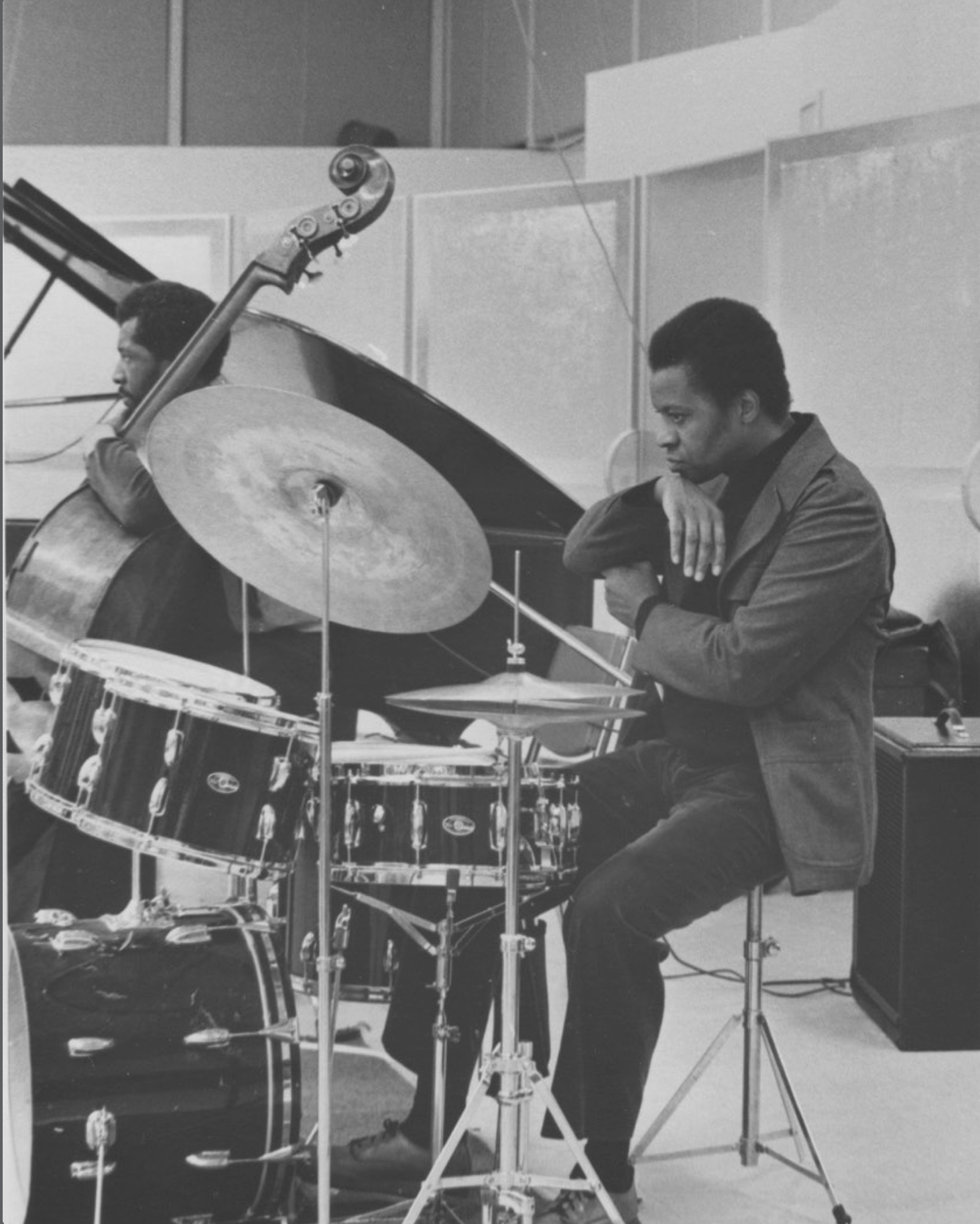
- Thomas in a recording session.

Background information
- Born: November 14, 1932; Newark, New Jersey, U.S.
- Died: October 20, 2013
- Genre: Jazz
- Occupation: Musician
- Instrument: Drums
- Years active: 1960–1999
- Label: Atlantic

Bobby Thomas (Robert C. Thomas) (November 14, 1932 – October 20, 2013) was a Kittitian-American jazz drummer. A member of Junior Mance's trio in 1960, Thomas recorded with the Montgomery Brothers in New York in January 1960.

== Early life and musical beginnings ==
Born in Newark, New Jersey, to West Indian parents emigrated from the Caribbean island of Saint Kitts, Thomas began his music studies at age 12. He studied drums with Al Germansky. He continued his training through high school at Central High. He performed with the Nat Phipps Band during his teenage years and young adulthood. He served in the United States Army from 1953 to 1955 where he played in the Army Band.

After his military service, he attended the Juilliard School of Music and graduated with Bachelor of Science degree. While at Juilliard he worked and recorded with Wes Montgomery, Gigi Gryce, Junior Mance, Illinois Jacquet, Roland Hanna, Hubert Laws, Don Ellis, Wayne Shorter, Richard Williams, Richard Davis.

== Career ==
On August 29, 1966 Thomas recorded on some unreleased Atlantic Records tracks with the Dorothy Ashby Octet, featuring Clark Terry, Hubert Laws, John Patton, Richard Davis, Ray Barretto, Randall Hicks, and on the following day, a further series of tracks, also unreleased, by the Dorothy Ashby Nonet, with the same personnel, minus Laws and with Richard Williams, and Clifford Jordan instead.

In his years studying at the Juilliard School he often played drums for dance classes and befriended choreographer Michael Bennett with whom he later worked as musical coordinator (credited as Robert Thomas) developing the critically acclaimed and Pulitzer Prize winning Broadway show A Chorus Line. His other Broadway musical credits include "Henry, Sweet Henry", " Promises, Promises", "Coco", "Company", "Don't Play Us Cheap".

Thomas performed with Jerome Robbins' Ballet U.S.A., Carmen McRae, Herbie Mann, Cy Coleman, Alvin Ailey Dance Company, Ray Charles, Jimmy Heath, Gloria Lynn, Charles Aznavour, Frank Wess, Dionne Warwick, Joe Williams, Lionel Hampton, Gerry Mulligan, Paul Desmond, Oliver Jones, and the Billy Taylor Trio. As a member of the Billy Taylor Trio he performed two command performances at the White House for both Presidents Richard Nixon and Gerald Ford, and toured Europe, Russia, the United States and the Caribbean.

Wayne Shorter, Hubert Laws, Junior Mance, Dave Pike, Attila Zoller have recorded Bobby's compositions and the David Frost T.V. Show Band led by Billy Taylor. He was the Musical Coordinator as well as the composer of the theme for Tony Brown's Journal.

Thomas was co-chair with Max Roach as percussion instructor at the Jazz in July Workshop in Jazz Improvisation at the University of Massachusetts at Amherst. He has conducted master classes at many universities and performing arts centers both in the U.S. and abroad. He was associate professor in the Jazz Faculty at Rutgers University's Mason Gross School of the Arts from 1993 through 1996.

Thomas was drum teacher to his friend and former Juilliard roommate Frank Perowsky's son, Jazz and rock drummer Ben Perowsky for many years. He also gave lessons to drummer/percussionist Alphonse Mouzon.

From 1999 to 2010 Thomas and his wife Nicole lived in Montréal, Québec, where he devoted his time to composing, mentoring young musicians and vocalists. The couple moved back to Harlem in New York City in 2011. They have two children, television producer Lorna Thomas and Marc Thomas.

The drummer Bobby Thomas is not to be confused with Robert Thomas Jr., the percussionist and hand drummer of the same name who played with Weather Report, though coincidentally he has been a lifelong friend of Weather Report founder Wayne Shorter, whom he met during their teenage years performing in New Jersey. Wayne recorded Thomas's original piece "Depois Do Amor, O Vazio (After Love, Emptiness)" on his album Odyssey of Iska.

== Discography ==
With Paul Desmond

- Desmond Blue (RCA Victor, 1961)

With Art Farmer

- The Many Faces of Art Farmer (Scepter, 1964)

With Stan Getz

- Billy Highstreet Samba (EmArcy, 1981 [1990])

With Gigi Gryce

- Reminiscin' (Mercury, 1960)

With Eddie Harris

- The Tender Storm (Atlantic, 1966)

With Hubert Laws

- The Laws of Jazz (Atlantic, 1964)
- Flute By-Laws (Atlantic, 1965)

With Junior Mance

- The Soulful Piano of Junior Mance (Riverside, 1960)
- That's Where It Is! (Capitol, 1965)
- Harlem Lullaby (Atlantic, 1967)

With Herbie Mann

- Herbie Mann Live at Newport (Atlantic, 1963)
- Latin Fever (Atlantic, 1964)
- My Kinda Groove (Atlantic, 1964)
- Our Mann Flute (Atlantic, 1966)
- The Beat Goes On (Atlantic, 1967)

With The Montgomery Brothers

- Groove Yard (Riverside, 1961)

With Dave Pike

- Manhattan Latin (Decca, 1964)

With Billy Taylor

- The Jazzmobile Allstars
- White Nights

With Richard Williams

- New Horn in Town (Candid, 1960)
