= Happy Time =

Happy Time or Happy Times may refer to:

- Happy Time (Roy Eldridge album), a 1975 studio album
- Happy Time (Junior Mance album), a 1962 studio album
- Happy Time (TV program), a Philippine variety show on Net 25
- Happy Times (1943 film), a Hungarian film
- Happy Times (2000 film), a Chinese film
- Happy Times (2014 film), a Mexican film
- Happy TImes (2021 film), Filipino romantic comedy film
- The Happy Time, a 1952 American comedy-drama film based on a novel and a play of the same name
- The Happy Time (musical), 1967, also based on the novel and play
- First Happy Time, a period of successful German U-boat warfare during the Battle of the Atlantic, July 1940 - October 1940 or April 1941
- Second Happy Time, a period of successful German U-boat warfare during the Battle of the Atlantic, January-August 1942
