= The Junior Mance Touch =

Studio album by Junior Mance
- Released: 1973
- Recorded: 1973
- Genre: Jazz
- Label: Polydor; PD 5051
- Producer: Marvin Lagunoff and Jim Rein

Junior Mance chronology
| That Lovin' Feelin' (1972) | The Junior Mance Touch (1973) | Holy Mama (1976) |

The Junior Mance Touch is an album by jazz pianist Junior Mance which was released on the Polydor label in 1973.

== Reception ==
Professional ratings
Review scores
| Source | Rating |
|---|---|
| Allmusic | 3/5 stars |

The Allmusic site awarded the album 3 stars calling it "A nice approach without the schmaltz".

== Track listing ==
1. "Zabuda" (Martin Rivera) - 5:02
2. "Let's Stay Together" (Al Green, Willie Mitchell, Al Jackson Jr.) - 5:37
3. "Tin Tin Deo" (Chano Pozo, Gil Fuller) - 7:08
4. "Midnight Special" (Lead Belly) - 5:22
5. "I Can See Clearly Now" (Johnny Nash) - 7:02
6. "Where I Come From" (Junior Mance) - 7:30
7. "Something" (George Harrison) - 6:08

== Personnel ==
- Junior Mance - piano
- Martin Rivera - bass
- Bruno Carr - drums
- String section arranged and conducted by William Fischer
