= Harlem Lullaby =

Studio album by Junior Mance
- Released: 1967
- Recorded: September 12, October 28 and November 7, 1966; New York City
- Genre: Jazz
- Length: 33:35
- Label: Atlantic; SD 1479
- Producer: Joel Dorn

Junior Mance chronology
That's Where It Is! (1964)	Harlem Lullaby (1967)	I Believe to My Soul (1967)

Harlem Lullaby is an album by jazz pianist Junior Mance which was recorded in 1966 and released on the Atlantic label.

== Reception ==
Professional ratings
Review scores
Source	Rating
Allmusic	3/5 stars

Allmusic awarded the album three stars with the review by Scott Yanow stating: "Most records by pianist Junior Mance are well worth getting, but this obscure Atlantic album was a bit of a misfire. One of the problems is that on three of the eight songs, Mance switches to harpsichord, which doesn't work too well".

== Track listing ==
All compositions are by Junior Mance except where indicated.

1. "The Uptown" - 3:52
2. "That Mellow Feeling" - 4:35
3. "Cootin'" - 4:43
4. "I'm Falling For You" (Joe "Trafalgar" Hubert, George Sanders, Clarence Williams) (misidentified on album as 'Floyd Trill') - 5:03
5. "St. James Infirmary" (Traditional) - 3:11
6. "Harlem Lullaby" - 4:54
7. "Run 'Em Round" - 4:37
8. "What Becomes of the Brokenhearted" (William Weatherspoon, Paul Riser, James Dean) - 3:02

== Personnel ==
- Junior Mance - piano (tracks 2, 4 & 6–8), harpsichord (tracks 1, 3 & 5)
- Bob Cunningham (tracks 2 & 6), Gene Taylor (tracks 1, 3–5, 7 & 8) - bass
- Alan Dawson (tracks 2 & 6), Ray Lucas (tracks 1, 3 & 8), Bobby Thomas (tracks 4, 5 & 7) - drums
