= Griff & Lock =

Studio album by The Eddie "Lockjaw" Davis and Johnny Griffin Quintet
- Released: 1961
- Recorded: November 4 & 10, 1960
- Studio: Plaza Sound Studios, New York City
- Genre: Jazz
- Label: Jazzland; JLP-42
- Producer: Orrin Keepnews

Eddie "Lockjaw" Davis chronology
Tough Tenors (1960)	Griff & Lock (1961)	The First Set (1961)

Johnny Griffin chronology
Tough Tenors (1960)	Griff & Lock (1960)	The First Set (1961)

Griff & Lock is an album by saxophonists Eddie "Lockjaw" Davis and Johnny Griffin recorded in 1960 and released on the Jazzland label.

== Reception ==
Professional ratings
Review scores
Source	Rating
AllMusic	4/5 stars
DownBeat	3/5 stars

The contemporaneous DownBeat reviewer described the album as "hearty, full-blowing jazz of the type now associated with this partnership of contrasting tenor styles". The AllMusic review by Scott Yanow stated: "Easily recommended to straightahead jazz fans."

== Track listing ==
1. "The Last Train from Overbrook" (James Moody) - 6:50
2. "Hey Lock!" (Eddie "Lockjaw" Davis) - 7:54
3. "Midnight at Minton's" (Babs Gonzales) - 5:23
4. "Second Balcony Jump" (Billy Eckstine, Jerry Valentine) - 4:19
5. "I'll Remember April" (Gene de Paul, Patricia Johnston, Don Raye) - 6:33
6. "Good Bait" (Tadd Dameron) - 7:39

== Personnel ==
- Eddie "Lockjaw" Davis, Johnny Griffin - tenor saxophone
- Junior Mance - piano
- Larry Gales - bass
- Ben Riley - drums
