= Blue Mance =

Studio album by The Junior Mance Trio
- Released: April 25, 1995
- Recorded: May 18, 1994
- Studio: Van Gelder Studio, Englewood Cliffs, NJ
- Genre: Jazz
- Length: 71:20
- Label: Chiaroscuro; CR(D) 331
- Producer: Hank O'Neal

Junior Mance chronology
Here 'Tis (1992)	Blue Mance (1995)	Softly as in a Morning Sunrise (1994)

Blue Mance is an album by the jazz pianist Junior Mance, recorded in 1994 and released on the Chiaroscuro label the following year.

== Reception ==
Professional ratings
Review scores
Source	Rating
AllMusic	4/5 stars
The Penguin Guide to Jazz Recordings	3.5/4 stars

AllMusic noted that "this CD finds Mance and his colleagues in excellent form on well-known standards as well as some lesser-known gems".

== Track listing ==
1. "Falling in Love with Love" (Richard Rodgers, Lorenz Hart) - 5:36
2. "Head Start" (Keter Betts) - 5:12
3. "Emily" (Johnny Mandel, Johnny Mercer) - 8:10
4. "Teach Me Tonight" (Gene de Paul, Sammy Cahn) - 5:21
5. "Blue Monk" (Thelonious Monk) - 9:31
6. "Blue Mance" (Junior Mance) - 7:35
7. "Shepherd of the Night Flock" (Duke Ellington) - 5:42
8. "If I Had You" (Jimmy Campbell, Reg Connelly, Ted Shapiro) - 5:52
9. "I Wish I Knew How It Would Feel to Be Free" (Billy Taylor) - 8:52
10. "Jazzspeak" - 9:07

== Personnel ==
- Junior Mance - piano
- Keter Betts - bass
- Jackie Williams - drums
