= Straight Ahead! (Junior Mance album) =

Studio album by Junior Mance with the Bob Bain Brass Ensemble
- Released: 1964
- Recorded: September 13, 14 & 15, 1964
- Studio: Capitol (Hollywood)
- Genre: Jazz
- Length: 28:14
- Label: Capitol; T/ST 2218
- Producer: David Cavanaugh

Junior Mance chronology
Get Ready, Set, Jump!!! (1964)	Straight Ahead! (1964)	That's Where It Is! (1965)

Straight Ahead! is an album by jazz pianist Junior Mance, recorded in 1964 and released on the Capitol label.

== Reception ==
Professional ratings
Review scores
Source	Rating
Allmusic	4/5 stars

The Allmusic reviewer Dave Nathan stated: "Combining Mance's natural blues-inflected piano with a big horn sound is a true aural treat. The result is a musical conversation with each side taking turns playing on or over the melody line. ... Usually a large-ensemble format doesn't allow for much diversion from the charts. Here it's clear that the band stayed with the charts, but Mance was allowed a good deal of leeway in his playing. He could respond to the call of the band as he saw fit. The result is a dynamic session combining the best of a disciplined brass assembly with the unfettered play of a top jazz improvisor".

== Track listing ==
1. "In a Mellow Tone" (Duke Ellington, Milt Gabler) - 2:28
2. "Hannah Strikes Again" (Hank Lentz) -1:45
3. "Li'l Darlin'" (Neal Hefti) - 4:52
4. "Diane" (Lew Pollack, Ernö Rapée) - 2:43
5. "Happy Time" (Junior Mance) - 2:35
6. "The Late, Late Show" (Roy Alfred, Murray Berlin) - 2:07
7. "Fine Brown Frame" (Guadalupe Cartiero, J. Mayo Williams) - 2:08
8. "Señor Mance" (Mance, Bob Bain) - 2:11
9. "Stompin' at the Savoy" (Benny Goodman, Chick Webb, Edgar Sampson, Andy Razaf) - 2:57
10. "Trouble in Mind" (Richard M. Jones) - 2:18
11. "The J. A. M. F." (Lentz) - 2:10

== Personnel ==
- Junior Mance - piano
- John Audino, Pete Candoli, Don Fagerquist, Al Porcino, Ray Triscari - trumpet
- Milt Bernhart, Vern Friley, Lew McCreary - trombone
- George Roberts, Ken Shroyer - bass trombone
- Bob Bain - guitar, musical director
- Monty Budwig - bass
- Shelly Manne - drums
- Bob Bain, David Cavanaugh - arranger
