= Blues Up & Down =

Studio album by The Eddie "Lockjaw" Davis and Johnny Griffin Quintet
- Released: 1961
- Recorded: June 5 and August 17, 1961; New York City
- Genre: Jazz
- Label: Jazzland; JLP-60
- Producer: Orrin Keepnews and Ray Fowler

Eddie "Lockjaw" Davis chronology
Lookin' at Monk! (1961)	Blues Up & Down (1961)	Tough Tenor Favorites (1962)

Johnny Griffin chronology
Change of Pace (1961)	Blues Up & Down (1961)	White Gardenia (1961)

Professional ratings
Review scores
Source	Rating
AllMusic	3/5 stars
The Penguin Guide to Jazz Recordings	3.5/4 stars

Blues Up & Down is an album by saxophonists Eddie "Lockjaw" Davis and Johnny Griffin recorded in 1961 and released on the Jazzland label.

== Reception ==
AllMusic awarded the album 3 stars.

== Track listing ==
All compositions by Johnny Griffin, except as indicated.

1. "Camp Meeting" - 5:26
2. "Blues Up and Down" (Gene Ammons, Sonny Stitt) - 5:03
3. "Nice and Easy" - 7:25
4. "Oh, Gee" (Matthew Gee) - 3:51
5. "Walkin'" (Richard Carpenter) - 6:56
6. "Leapin' On Lenox" (Eddie "Lockjaw" Davis) - 4:35
7. "Layin' On Mellow" (Griffin, Davis) - 4:48

== Personnel ==
- Eddie "Lockjaw" Davis, Johnny Griffin - tenor saxophone
- Lloyd Mayers - piano
- Larry Gales - bass
- Ben Riley - drums
