= With a Lotta Help from My Friends =

Studio album by Junior Mance
- Released: 1970
- Recorded: March 16–19, 1970; Atlantic Studios, New York City
- Genre: Jazz
- Length: 31:12
- Label: Atlantic; SD 1562
- Producer: Joel Dorn

Junior Mance chronology
Live at the Top (1969)	With a Lotta Help from My Friends (1970)	Dexter Gordon with Junior Mance at Montreux (1970)

With a Lotta Help from My Friends is a rock/jazz/funk fusion album by jazz pianist Junior Mance which was released on the Atlantic vinyl label in 1970.

== Reception ==
Professional ratings
Review scores
Source	Rating
Allmusic	3/5 stars
The Penguin Guide to Jazz Recordings	3/4 stars

Allmusic awarded the album 3 stars.

== Track listing ==
1. "Thank You (Falettinme Be Mice Elf Agin)" (Sylvester Stewart) - 4:18
2. "Never Say Naw" (Percy Mayfield) - 4:04
3. "Don't Rush Us" (Junior Mance, Billy Cobham, Chuck Rainey) - 5:09
4. "Well I'll Be White Black" (Cobham) - 4:05
5. "Home Groovin" (Mance) - 3:40
6. "Spinning Wheel" (David Clayton-Thomas) - 4:57
7. "Don't Cha Hear Me Callin' to Ya" (Rudy Stevenson) - 5:08

== Personnel ==
- Junior Mance - piano
- Eric Gale - guitar
- Chuck Rainey - electric bass
- Billy Cobham - drums
