= John Mars =

- Origin: Canada
- Genres: Pop, rock
- Occupations: Singer, songwriter, percussionist
- Years active: 1960s–present
- Website: www.johnmars.com

John Mars is a Canadian singer, songwriter, and percussionist. Mars began his musical training at Sykes Music in Brantford, Ontario where he studied the drums with Carl Lemke. In the late 1960s, he played the drums in the band "John Mars and the Martians" with bassist Kevin Cosman and guitarist Stan Baka. The group disbanded after Baka was killed by a drunk driver. Mard then moved to Toronto where he met pianist Stuart Broomer and saxophonist Bill Smith. The three men formed the successful jazz trio "Broomer, Mars & Smith" which actively performed throughout the 1970s. In 1980 Smith left to pursue other projects and the duo "Stuart Broomer & John Mars" was formed. The duo performed up through 1986 and notably released the 1983 album Annihilated Surprise on Ugly Dog Records.

While performing in the jazz duo with Broomer, Mars performed concurrently in the rock band "Brian's Children" which he established with guitarist /songwriter Dave Templeton (Temps) and drummer Teddy Fury in 1979. For this group, Martin served as lead singer and the main songwriter. The group released one single "Cut Her Hair b/w Oh Yeah" which was produced by Daniel Lanois. In 1986 Mars shortened the band's name to "The Children" and formed a new band with guitarist/songwriter Aurelio Lanzalone and bassist Mark Sinkowski. The group performed up through 1991 and went through several membership changes.

In 1988 Mars began performing in the Ontario area with guitarist David Essig. In the mid-1990s he met guitarist Mike Ardelli and the two began performing with their mutual pal drummer Glenn Kimberley in an ad hoc group called the Natural Born Lovers. The band played rockabilly/roots in concert series at various universities. The band disbanded when Ardelli died of a brain tumor at the age of 24.
