= Glidin' Along =

Studio album by Bennie Green
- Released: 1961
- Recorded: March 9 & 22, 1961
- Genre: Jazz
- Length: 39:31
- Label: Jazzland
- Producer: Orrin Keepnews

Bennie Green chronology
Hornful of Soul (1960)	Glidin' Along (1961)	My Main Man (1964)

Glidin' Along is an album by American trombonist Bennie Green recorded in 1961 and released on the Jazzland label.

== Reception ==
Professional ratings
Review scores
Source	Rating
Allmusic	3/5 stars
The Penguin Guide to Jazz Recordings	3/4 stars

The Allmusic review awarded the album 3 stars.

== Track listing ==
All compositions by Bennie Green except where noted.

1. "African Dream" - 5:45
2. "Sweet Sucker" (Johnny Griffin) - 8:00
3. "Glidin' Along" (Babs Gonzales) - 5:08
4. "Green's Scene" (Gonzales, Green) - 8:27
5. "Milkshake" (Griffin) - 3:59
6. "Stardust" (Hoagy Carmichael, Mitchell Parish) - 4:13
7. "Expubidence" (Gonzales) - 3:59
- Recorded in New York City on March 9 (tracks 2, 3, 6 & 7) and March 22 (tracks 1, 4 & 5), 1961.

== Personnel ==
- Bennie Green - trombone
- Johnny Griffin - tenor saxophone
- Junior Mance - piano
- Paul Chambers (tracks 2, 3, 6 & 7), Larry Gales (tracks 1, 4 & 5) - bass
- Ben Riley - drums
