= Tough Tenors =

Studio album by The Johnny Griffin and Eddie "Lockjaw" Davis Quintet
- Released: 1960
- Recorded: November 4 & 10, 1960; Plaza Sound Studios, New York City
- Genre: Jazz
- Label: Jazzland; JLP-31
- Producer: Orrin Keepnews

Johnny Griffin chronology
Johnny Griffin’s Studio Jazz Party	Tough Tenors (1960)	Griff & Lock (1960)

Eddie "Lockjaw" Davis chronology
Trane Whistle (1960)	Tough Tenors (1960)	Griff & Lock (1960)

Tough Tenors is an album by saxophonists Johnny Griffin and Eddie "Lockjaw" Davis recorded in 1960 and released on the Jazzland label.

== Reception ==
Professional ratings
Review scores
Source	Rating
AllMusic	4/5 stars

AllMusic awarded the album 4 stars stating: "Tough Tenors is one of the many amazing jazz recordings from 1960, and will please saxophone fans, Davis/Griffin fans, and anyone who enjoys classic hard bop."

== Track listing ==
1. "Tickle Toe" (Lester Young) - 5:30
2. "Save Your Love for Me" (Buddy Johnson) - 7:09
3. "Twins" (Eddie "Lockjaw" Davis, Johnny Griffin) - 6:35
4. "Funky Fluke" (Bennie Green) - 9:16
5. "Imagination" (Johnny Burke, Jimmy Van Heusen) - 4:29
6. "Soft Winds" (Benny Goodman, Fletcher Henderson) - 7:17

== Personnel ==
- Eddie "Lockjaw" Davis - tenor saxophone, except track 5, Johnny Griffin - tenor saxophone
- Junior Mance - piano
- Larry Gales - bass
- Ben Riley - drums
