= Hotel Kenmore Hall =

Hotel in Manhattan, New York

Coordinates: 40°44′22.08″N 73°59′2.59″W

Hotel Kenmore Hall is a 22-story single room occupancy hotel located at 145 East 23rd Street in the Gramercy section of Manhattan, designed by architect Maurice Deutsch and constructed in 1927. Author Nathanael West lived and worked at the hotel as a night manager in the early years after the hotel opened. One of West's real-life experiences at the hotel inspired the incident between Romola Martin and Homer Simpson that would later appear in The Day of the Locust (1939). West allowed friends like Edmund Wilson, Erskine Caldwell, S. J. Perelman and Maxwell Bodenheim free room and meals. Dashiell Hammett finished The Maltese Falcon here.

From Lonely Hearts, published in 2010 by Marion Meade: "Kenmore Hall, a pretty redbrick residence hotel not yet two years old, was home to hundreds of young professionals who booked by the week or month. Prized for its desirable address near Gramercy Park, its reasonable rates, and amenities such as a pool and roof garden, the place always had a waiting list for vacancies, sometimes a long one. Nat (Nathanael West) was supposed to remember guests' names, but he happened to know a great deal more, and not just gossip either. He knew exactly when they awoke and when they left for their offices, who got mail and from whom, what time they went to bed, and which ones couldn't sleep, because the bleary-eyed were known to shuffle down to the lobby and fret about it, as if he could do anything. There were friendly women who found pretexts for inviting him to their rooms. To all proposals he would beg off with an easy smile and a general refusal worded to give no offense. He took fewer pains with the prostitutes, alone or in pairs, who constantly tried to sneak past the desk on their way to the elevator. Hookers — and stolen bath towels — were his biggest aggravations."

The 600+ room Kenmore offered affordable hotel accommodations in mid-town Manhattan for more than 50 years. By the late 1970s, the hotel was a rather dilapidated warren, filled with single folks living off tiny pensions, and a sprinkling of ironic hipsters who enjoyed feeling like they were living in a fin de siècle bohemia. Occasionally a bewildered family of Scandinavian tourists would wander into the paint-peeling lobby, an old hotel guidebook in their hand that had recommended the place. The pool, amazingly, was still open, and maids still cleaned the communal baths on each floor. In 1985 the hotel was purchased by Tran Dinh Truong, a Vietnamese born hotel operator; a ten-year period of decline between 1985 and 1994 in which crime and related illegal activities spiked at the hotel led to the June 1994 seizure of the building by the United States Marshal Service in what was later described as the largest asset forfeiture action ever undertaken by the federal government. Despite entreaties by federal and local authorities over a period of years, the hotel's ownership failed to take corrective action and the Kenmore became "a beehive of narcotics-related activities, including the sale, distribution, preparation, packaging and/or possession of narcotics." Five years after the seizure in 1999, after undergoing a complete gut-renovation, the building was re-opened as a 326-unit supportive housing development by the New York City based non-profit organization Housing and Services, Inc.

== See also ==
- List of former hotels in Manhattan
