= Live at the Top =

Live album by Junior Mance
- Released: 1969
- Recorded: September 6, 27 & 28, 1968; The Village Gate, New York City
- Genre: Jazz
- Length: 36:13
- Label: Atlantic; SD 1521
- Producer: Joel Dorn

Junior Mance chronology
The Good Life (1967)	Live at the Top (1969)	With a Lotta Help from My Friends (1970)

Live at the Top is a live album by jazz pianist Junior Mance which was released on the Atlantic label in 1969.

== Reception ==
Professional ratings
Review scores
Source	Rating
Allmusic	3/5 stars

Allmusic awarded the album 3 stars with the review by Dave Nathan stating, "This is another satisfying session by Mance, who never received the attention and credit he merited for his playing".

== Track listing ==
1. "Before This Time Another Year" (Traditional) - 9:32
2. "I Wish I Knew (How It Would Feel to Be Free)" (Billy Taylor, Dick Dalas) - 9:38
3. "That's All" (Alan Brandt, Bob Haymes) - 9:13
4. "Turning Point" (David Newman) - 7:50

== Personnel ==
- Junior Mance - piano
- David Newman - flute (track 4), tenor saxophone (track 3)
- Wilbur Little - bass
- Rudy Collins (tracks 2–4), Paul Gusman (track 1) - drums
