= Junior Mance Trio at the Village Vanguard =

Live album by Junior Mance
- Released: 1961
- Recorded: February 22–23, 1961
- Venue: Village Vanguard, New York City
- Genre: Jazz
- Length: 42:10
- Label: Jazzland; JLP 41
- Producer: Orrin Keepnews

Junior Mance chronology
The Soulful Piano of Junior Mance (1960)	Junior Mance Trio at the Village Vanguard (1961)	Big Chief! (1961)

Junior Mance Trio at the Village Vanguard is a live album by jazz pianist Junior Mance which was recorded at the Village Vanguard in 1961 and released on the Jazzland label.

== Reception ==
Professional ratings
Review scores
Source	Rating
AllMusic	4.5/5 stars
DownBeat	3/5 stars
The Penguin Guide to Jazz Recordings	3/4 stars

The contemporaneous DownBeat reviewer wrote that the album was inferior to The Soulful Piano of Junior Mance, because it lacked emotion and individuality. The AllMusic site awarded the album 4½ stars stating: "Mance's many fans have no reason to despair though for, in addition to a boppish rendition of "Girl of My Dreams", the pianist does perform a generous amount of blues and soulful pieces".

== Track listing ==
All compositions by Junior Mance except where noted.

1. "Looptown" - 5:05
2. "Letter from Home" - 4:50
3. "Girl of My Dreams" (Sunny Clapp) - 4:01
4. "63rd Street Theme" (Johnny Griffin) - 6:17
5. "Smokey Blues" - 6:36
6. "9:20 Special" (William Engvick, Earle Warren) - 5:10
7. "Bingo Domingo" (Eddie "Lockjaw" Davis) - 4:41
8. "You Are Too Beautiful" (Lorenz Hart, Richard Rodgers) - 5:30

== Personnel ==
- Junior Mance - piano
- Larry Gales - bass
- Ben Riley - drums
