= Holy Mama =

Studio album by Junior Mance
- Released: 1976
- Recorded: May 3–4, 1976
- Studio: Vanguard Studios, New York City
- Genre: Jazz
- Label: East Wind; EW-8036
- Producer: Kiyoshi Itoh and Yasohachi Itoh

Junior Mance chronology
The Junior Mance Touch (1973)	Holy Mama (1976)	Deep (1980)

Holy Mama is an album by jazz pianist Junior Mance which was released on the Japanese East Wind label in 1976.

== Reception ==
Professional ratings
Review scores
Source	Rating
Allmusic	4/5 stars

The Allmusic site awarded the album 4 stars stating "These 1976 sessions by pianist Junior Mance are typical for the era, mixing originals, standards, and a modern pop tune. ...This is an excellent date that is well worth seeking out".

== Track listing ==
All compositions by Junior Mance except where noted.

1. "By the Time I Get to Phoenix" (Jimmy Webb) - 7:33
2. "God Bless the Child" (Billie Holiday, Arthur Herzog, Jr.) - 8:20
3. "That Mellow Feeling" - 7:16
4. "Holy Mama" - 5:21
5. "Miss Otis Regrets" (Cole Porter) - 2:58
6. "The Good Old Days" - 5:59
7. "Blues for the Schnug" - 6:45

== Personnel ==
- Junior Mance - piano
- Martin Rivera - bass
- Salvatore LaRocca - drums
