= The Soul of Hollywood =

Studio album by Junior Mance
- Released: 1962
- Recorded: October–December, 1961 and January, 1962; Plaza Sound Studios, New York City
- Genre: Jazz
- Label: Jazzland; JLP 63
- Producer: Orrin Keepnews

Junior Mance chronology
Big Chief! (1961)	The Soul of Hollywood (1962)	Junior's Blues (1962)

The Soul of Hollywood is an album by jazz pianist Junior Mance featuring interpretations of music from motion pictures which was recorded in late 1961 and early 1962 and released on the Jazzland label.

== Reception ==
Professional ratings
Review scores
Source	Rating
Allmusic	3/5 stars

The Allmusic site awarded the album 3 stars with the review by Alex Henderson stating: "The Soul of Hollywood was an interesting departure for Junior Mance. Most of the time he has been heard in small-group settings, but on this album the pianist is backed by an orchestra arranged and conducted by trombonist Melba Liston.... The Soul of Hollywood isn't quite in a class with Gil Evans or Oliver Nelson's best work, but it's still a decent example of orchestral jazz".

== Track listing ==
1. "Never on Sunday" (Manos Hadjidakis) - 2:47
2. "Maria" (Leonard Bernstein, Stephen Sondheim) - 2:51
3. "Tara's Theme" (Max Steiner) - 4:00
4. "Fanny" (Harold Rome) - 4:00
5. "On Green Dolphin Street" (Bronisław Kaper, Ned Washington) - 2:36
6. "One-Eyed Jacks" (Hugo Friedhofer) - 2:33
7. "Exodus" (Ernest Gold) - 2:30
8. "Invitation" (Kaper) - 4:03
9. "The Apartment" (Adolph Deutsch) - 3:35
10. "Goodbye Again" (Georges Auric, Dory Langdon) - 4:09
11. "Spellbound" (Miklós Rózsa) - 3:32

== Personnel ==
- Junior Mance - piano
- Ernie Royal, Clark Terry - trumpet
- Jimmy Cleveland, Britt Woodman - trombone
- Romeo Penque - flute
- Jerome Richardson - flute, tenor saxophone
- Danny Bank - baritone saxophone, bass clarinet
- George Duvivier - bass
- Osie Johnson - drums
- Melba Liston - arranger, conductor
- Unidentified orchestra
