= Steve Holt (Canadian musician) =

Canadian jazz pianist

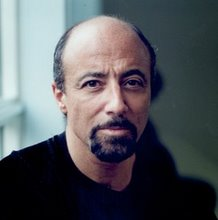
- Steve Holt

Background information
- Born: 1954 (age 71–72); Montreal, Canada
- Genres: Jazz, Pop/Rock
- Occupation: Musician
- Instrument: Piano
- Years active: 1980s–present

Steve Holt (born 1954) is a Canadian jazz pianist and composer.

== Early life and education ==
Born in Montreal, Quebec, in 1954, Holt exhibited musical ability in early childhood, playing piano at the age of four. By the time he was a teenager, Holt was a regular on the Montreal club scene.

Holt remained self-taught until he entered McGill University. There, he was taught by pianist Armas Maiste, whose bebop playing influenced him. Holt also became a student of Kenny Barron, traveling regularly to New York City for private lessons with the pianist. Holt graduated from McGill in 1981 with that university's first Bachelor of Music major in Jazz Performance, and taught jazz improvisation there.

== Later life and career ==
In 1983, Holt's debut album, The Lion's Eyes, was released. It was nominated for a Juno Award. He has worked with jazz musicians Larry Coryell, James Moody, Eddie "Cleanhead" Vinson, and Archie Shepp. Holt moved to Toronto in 1987 and worked as an equity analyst. For a time, he also continued playing clubs at night. Further albums were released in the 1990s: Christmas Light (1991); Just Duet (1992); and Catwalk (1994).

In 1999, Holt returned to concentrating on music full-time. Three years later, his fifth album, The Dream, was released. He then moved into music production, and stopped performing jazz live until 2014. Following a move to the countryside, his interest in jazz performance returned. In 2017, he opened a health food store in Warkworth, Ontario, that operated as a jazz venue (The Jazz Cafe) once a week.

After a 20 year absence from the recording field, Holt released a new album in April 2025. The album, IMPACT, featured several new compositions and a new band, The Steve Holt Jazz Impact Quintet. The album received widespread international acclaim and a 2026 JUNO Award nomination for Jazz Album of the Year.

In November 2025 Holt released a holiday album, "Jazz Christmas - Live At Waring House", a live album recorded December 10, 2024.

== Discography ==
- 1983: The Lion's Eyes (Plug)
- 1991: Christmas Light (Inner Music)
- 1992: Just Duet (Sackville) with Kieran Overs
- 1993: Catwalk (Sackville)
- 2001: The Dream (Trilogy)
- 2025: Impact (Inner Music)
- 2025 Jazz Christmas - Live at Waring House (Inner Music)

Singles

- 2002: We Need You (Trilogy)
- 2002: Just to Be With You (Trilogy)
- 2003: Soon (Trilogy)
