= Junior (Junior Mance album) =

Studio album by Junior Mance
- Released: 1959
- Recorded: April 9, 1959; New York City
- Genre: Jazz
- Length: 44:44
- Label: Verve; MGV 8319/MGVS 6057
- Producer: Norman Granz

Junior Mance chronology
Junior (1959)	The Soulful Piano of Junior Mance (1960)

Junior is the debut album led by jazz pianist Junior Mance which was recorded in 1959 and released on the Verve label. Norman Granz offered Mance the opportunity to record his own album after working on the sessions that produced Dizzy Gillespie's Have Trumpet, Will Excite!.

== Reception ==
Professional ratings
Review scores
Source	Rating
Allmusic	3/5 stars

The Allmusic site awarded the album 3 stars.

== Track listing ==
All compositions by Junior Mance except where noted.

1. "A Smooth One" (Benny Goodman, Ernie Royal) – 3:29
2. "Miss Jackie's Delight" (Gene Wright) – 3:54
3. "Whisper Not" (Benny Golson) – 4:22
4. "Love for Sale" (Cole Porter) – 4:26
5. "Lilacs in the Rain" (Peter DeRose, Mitchell Parish) – 3:42
6. "Small Fry" (Hoagy Carmichael, Frank Loesser) – 4:08
7. "Jubilation" – 3:31
8. "Birks' Works" (Dizzy Gillespie) – 5:45
9. "Blues for Beverlee" – 7:54
10. "Junior's Tune" – 3:33

== Personnel ==
- Junior Mance - piano
- Ray Brown - bass
- Lex Humphries - drums
