= Deep (Junior Mance album) =

Studio album by Junior Mance Trio
- Released: 1980
- Recorded: June 1980; Downtown Sound, New York City
- Genre: Jazz
- Label: JSP; 1013
- Producer: John Stedman

Junior Mance chronology
Holy Mama (1976)	Deep (1980)	The Tender Touch of Junior Mance and Martin Rivera (1983)

Deep is an album by jazz pianist Junior Mance which was released on the JSP label in 1980.

== Reception ==
Professional ratings
Review scores
Source	Rating
AllMusic	3/5 stars
The Penguin Guide to Jazz Recordings	3.5/4 stars

AllMusic awarded the album 3 stars calling it a "a patented blend of soul jazz, blues, and mainstream fare" and stating: "Mance reflects the influence of Ahmad Jamal in his phrasing and solos, but works in the Gene Harris school, eschewing fancy statements and intricate progressions for more bluesy, funky lines".

== Track listing ==
1. "9:20 Special" (Earle Warren, Jack Palmer, William Engvick)
2. "Georgia on My Mind" (Hoagy Carmichael, Stuart Gorrell)
3. "Small Fry" (Carmichael, Frank Loesser)
4. "In the Evening" (Leroy Carr, Don Raye)
5. "I Want a Little Girl" (Murray Mencher, Billy Moll)
6. "Deep" (Junior Mance)
7. "Ease On down the Road" (Charlie Smalls)
8. "Smokey Blues" (Mance)

== Personnel ==
- Junior Mance - piano
- Martin Rivera - bass
- Walter Bolden - drums
