= Truckin' and Trakin' =

Studio album by Junior Mance with David "Fathead" Newman
- Released: 1984
- Recorded: December 13, 1983; New York City
- Genre: Jazz
- Label: Bee Hive; BH 7015
- Producer: Bob Porter

Junior Mance chronology
For Dancers Only (1983)	Truckin' and Trakin' (1984)	Junior Mance Special (1986-88)

Truckin' and Trakin' is an album by jazz pianist Junior Mance with saxophonist David "Fathead" Newman which was released on the Bee Hive label in 1984.

== Reception ==
Professional ratings
Review scores
Source	Rating
Allmusic	4/5 stars

Scott Yanow of Allmusic gave the album 4 stars, stating that "Mance and tenor saxophonist David 'Fathead' Newman make for a logical combination, since their soulful styles often straddle the boundary between jazz and R&B". Writing for United Press International, Ken Franckling stated that Mance's "versatile playing ranges from sophisticated and bluesy to churchy and funky."

== Track listing ==
1. "Mean Old Amtrak" (Junior Mance) - 6:55
2. "That Lucky Old Sun" (Beasley Smith, Haven Gillespie) - 5:15
3. "Truckin'" (Hank Crawford) - 6:15
4. "Funky Carnival" (Esmond Edwards) - 7:35
5. "Miss Otis Regrets" (Cole Porter) - 5:59
6. "Birks' Works (composition)" (Dizzy Gillespie) - 5:51

== Personnel ==
- Junior Mance - piano
- David "Fathead" Newman - tenor saxophone, flute
- Martin Rivera - bass
- Walt Bolden - drums
