= The Soulful Piano of Junior Mance =

Studio album by Junior Mance
- Released: 1960
- Recorded: October 25, 1960; New York City
- Genre: Jazz
- Label: Jazzland; JLP 30
- Producer: Orrin Keepnews

Junior Mance chronology
Junior (1960)	The Soulful Piano of Junior Mance (1960)	Junior Mance Trio at the Village Vanguard (1961)

The Soulful Piano of Junior Mance is an album by jazz pianist Junior Mance which was recorded in 1960 and released on the Jazzland label.

== Reception ==
Professional ratings
Review scores
Source	Rating
AllMusic	3/5 stars
DownBeat	4/5 stars

The AllMusic site awarded the album three stars. Leonard Feather noted in DownBeat that "Mance plays in a modern groove that combines several current trends, with a heavy accent on the blues."

== Track listing ==
All compositions by Junior Mance except where noted.

1. "The Uptown" – 4:02
2. "Ralph's New Blues" (Milt Jackson) – 4:20
3. "Main Stem" (Duke Ellington) – 4:21
4. "Darling, Je Vous Aime Beaucoup" (Anna Sosenko) – 3:38
5. "Playhouse" – 4:14
6. "Sweet and Lovely" (Gus Arnheim, Jules LeMare, Harry Tobias) – 3:55
7. "In the Land of Oo-Bla-Dee" (Milt Orent, Mary Lou Williams) – 4:36
8. "I Don't Care" (Ray Bryant) – 4:27
9. "Swingmatism" (Jay McShann, William Scott) – 5:12

== Personnel ==
- Junior Mance – piano
- Ben Tucker – bass
- Bobby Thomas – drums
