= Junior's Blues =

Studio album by Junior Mance
- Released: 1963
- Recorded: February 14, 1963; New York City
- Genre: Jazz
- Label: Riverside; RLP 447
- Producer: Orrin Keepnews

Junior Mance chronology
The Soul of Hollywood (1962)	Junior's Blues (1963)	Happy Time (1962)

Junior's Blues is an album by jazz pianist Junior Mance which was recorded in 1963 and released on the Riverside label.

== Reception ==
Professional ratings
Review scores
Source	Rating
Allmusic	4.5/5 stars
The Penguin Guide to Jazz Recordings	4/4 stars

The Allmusic site awarded the album 4½ stars stating "It's one of many consistently crafted works Mance would make over the years that mixed jazz and blues 50/50. Recommended".

== Track listing ==
All compositions by Junior Mance except where noted.

1. "Down the Line" - 4:58
2. "Creole Love Call" (Duke Ellington) - 3:19
3. "Rainy Mornin' Blues" - 4:00
4. "Yancey Special" (Meade Lux Lewis, Andy Razaf) - 3:01
5. "Gravy Waltz" (Steve Allen, Ray Brown) - 3:15
6. "Cracklin'" - 4:32
7. "In the Evening" (Leroy Carr, Don Raye) - 3:47
8. "Blue Monk" (Thelonious Monk) - 6:28
9. "The Jumpin' Blues" (Jay McShann, Charlie Parker) - 5:24

== Personnel ==
- Junior Mance - piano
- Bob Cranshaw - bass
- Mickey Roker - drums
