= Change of Pace =

Studio album by Johnny Griffin
- Released: 1961
- Recorded: February 7 & 16, 1961; New York City
- Genre: Jazz
- Length: 45:34
- Label: Riverside; RLP 368

Johnny Griffin chronology
| Lookin' at Monk! (1961) | Change of Pace (1961) | Blues Up & Down (1961) |

Change of Pace is an album by jazz saxophonist Johnny Griffin which was recorded in 1961 and released on the Riverside label.

== Reception ==
Professional ratings
Review scores
| Source | Rating |
|---|---|
| AllMusic | 3/5 stars |
| DownBeat | 4/5 stars |
| The Penguin Guide to Jazz Recordings | 3/4 stars |

The contemporaneous DownBeat reviewer commented that the "ensemble blend creates a fresh sound which, by itself, gives several of these pieces a texture sufficiently different from the accustomed to set them apart". AllMusic awarded the album 3 stars. Duck Baker in the May 2000 JazzTimes referred to it as a great album revealing the arranging skills of the leader to a new extent, and that the two bass mix was effective.

== Track listing ==
All compositions by Johnny Griffin, except as indicated.

1. "Soft and Furry" – 3:43
2. "In the Still of the Night" (Cole Porter) – 3:29
3. "The Last of the Fat Pants" – 4:20
4. "Same to You" – 4:25
5. "Connie's Bounce" (Consuela Lee) – 4:01
6. "Situation" (Julius Watkins) – 3:56
7. "Nocturne" – 5:27
8. "Why Not?" – 5:02
9. "As We All Know" (Lee) – 4:46

== Personnel ==
- Johnny Griffin – tenor saxophone
- Julius Watkins – French horn
- Larry Gales, Bill Lee – bass
- Ben Riley – drums
