= Housing and Services, Inc. =

Nonprofit Organization

Housing and Services, Inc. (HSI)
- Founded: 1987
- Type: Supportive Housing Organization
- Tax ID no.: 51 0201833
- Location: 243 West 30th Street, 2nd floor, New York, NY 10001
- Region served: New York City Neighborhoods of Harlem, Gramercy Park, Upper West Side, Upper Manhattan, and the Bronx
- Employees: 85
- Website: http://hsi-ny.org/

HSI is a nonprofit social services organization in New York City that manages and develops housing programs for lower income households and New Yorkers with special needs.

Founded in 1987, HSI was originally a spin-off of the Vera Institute of Justice. Its supportive housing programs include Hotel Kenmore Hall, The Narragansett and Cecil Hotel, home to the famous Minton's Playhouse, all in Manhattan, and the HSI Scatter Site Program in Manhattan and the Bronx. Each program provides services that are customized to aid men, women, and children with special needs, living with a range of housing barriers including: those who are veterans, older adults, ex-offenders, families with children, and people living with HIV/AIDS, mental illness, physical disabilities, developmental disabilities and addiction. On-site programs and services include case management provided by HSI social services staff, 24/7 front desk staff, educational, medical, nutritional, and financial programs. Housing & Services, Inc. is responsible for developing and preserving more than 2,000 units of housing, including technical assistance to tenants working to convert their Mitchell-Lama Housing Program rental projects into affordable cooperatives, programs for youth aging out of foster care, actors, and housing for people living with HIV/AIDS.
