= Lookin' at Monk! =

Studio album by The Johnny Griffin and Eddie "Lockjaw" Davis Quintet
- Released: 1961
- Recorded: February 7, 1961; New York City
- Genre: Jazz
- Label: Jazzland; JLP-39
- Producer: Orrin Keepnews

Johnny Griffin chronology
The Midnight Show (1961)	Lookin' at Monk! (1961)	Change of Pace (1961)

Eddie "Lockjaw" Davis chronology
The Midnight Show (1961)	Lookin' at Monk! (1961)	Blues Up & Down (1961)

Lookin' at Monk! is an album by saxophonists Johnny Griffin and Eddie "Lockjaw" Davis featuring compositions associated with Thelonious Monk recorded in 1961 and released on the Jazzland label.

== Reception ==
Professional ratings
Review scores
Source	Rating
AllMusic	4/5 stars
The Penguin Guide to Jazz Recordings	2.5/4 stars

The AllMusic review by Rick Anderson stated: "this was only the second all-Monk program anyone had recorded and several of these numbers had yet to attain standard status. The playing is uniformly inventive and witty (both required attributes when approaching this repertoire), and Mance is particularly to be commended for maintaining a graceful and elegant attack and not trying to praise Monk by imitation".

== Track listing ==
All compositions by Thelonious Monk, except as indicated.

1. "In Walked Bud" - 4:34
2. "Well, You Needn't" - 5:31
3. "Ruby, My Dear" - 4:39
4. "Rhythm-A-Ning" - 3:53
5. "Epistrophy" (Kenny Clarke, Monk) - 8:36
6. "'Round Midnight" - 5:25
7. "Stickball (I Mean You)" (Coleman Hawkins, Monk) - 5:52

== Personnel ==
- Eddie "Lockjaw" Davis, Johnny Griffin - tenor saxophone
- Junior Mance - piano
- Larry Gales - bass
- Ben Riley - drums
