= That's Where It Is! =

Studio album by Junior Mance Trio
- Released: 1965
- Recorded: October 12, 13 & 17, 1964; New York City
- Genre: Jazz
- Length: 33:00
- Label: Capitol; T/ST 2393
- Producer: David Cavanaugh

Junior Mance chronology
Straight Ahead! (1964)	That's Where It Is! (1965)	Harlem Lullaby (1966)

That's Where It Is! is an album by jazz pianist Junior Mance which was recorded in 1964 and released on the Capitol label.

== Reception ==
Professional ratings
Review scores
Source	Rating
Allmusic	3/5 stars

The Allmusic site awarded the album 3 stars.

== Track listing ==
1. "Wabash Blues" (Fred Meinken, Dave Ringle) - 4:31
2. "In the Dark" (Lil Green) - 3:02
3. "The Host (W.L.Y.T.M.)" (Junior Mance) - 2:25
4. "I Got It Bad (and That Ain't Good)" (Duke Ellington, Paul Francis Webster) - 4:08
5. "I Want a Little Girl" (Murray Mencher, Billy Moll) – 2:45
6. "That's Where It Is!" (Bill Schluger) - 2:34
7. "St. Louis Blues" (W. C. Handy) - 4:37
8. "It Ain't Necessarily So" (George Gershwin, Ira Gershwin) - 2:35
9. "Caribe Blues" (Mance) - 2:59
10. "God Bless the Child" (Arthur Herzog, Jr., Billie Holiday) - 5:15
11. "Hanky Panky" (Marvin Fisher) - 2:44

== Personnel ==
- Junior Mance - piano
- George Tucker - bass
- Bobby Thomas - drums
