= Get Ready, Set, Jump!!! =

Studio album by Junior Mance with the Bob Bain Brass Ensemble
- Released: 1964
- Recorded: January 6, 7 & 8, 1964
- Studio: Capitol (Hollywood)
- Genre: Jazz
- Length: 29:29
- Label: Capitol; T/ST 2092
- Producer: David Cavanaugh

Junior Mance chronology
Happy Time (1962)	Get Ready, Set, Jump!!! (1964)	Straight Ahead! (1964)

Get Ready, Set, Jump!!! is an album by jazz pianist Junior Mance, recorded in 1964 and released on the Capitol label.

== Reception ==
Professional ratings
Review scores
Source	Rating
Allmusic	4/5 stars

The Allmusic site awarded the album 4 stars, with reviewer Dave Nathan stating, "For his first recording session for Capitol, jazz blues pianist Junior Mance abandoned his usual small-group format for a big-band recording. Mance is joined by some of the cream of the West Coast studio and jazz players for a session that features Mance doing his blues thing on piano while the band swings at various tempi ranging from high moderate paces to high-energy romping. There are no reeds, so the sound is brighter and edgier than usual, but never shrill, resembling somewhat the style of the Count Basie Orchestra. ... his work and the ensemble playing are outstanding and, despite the parsimonious time allowance, the album is recommended".

== Track listing ==
1. "Sweet Talkin' Hannah" (Hank Lenz) - 2:39
2. "Jubilation" (Junior Mance) - 2:24
3. "Moten Swing" (Bennie Moten, Buster Moten) - 3:30
4. "But Beautiful" (Jimmy Van Heusen, Johnny Burke) - 2:18
5. "Broadway" (Billy Byrd, Teddy McRae, Henri Wood) - 1:58
6. "Hear Me Talkin' to Ya" (Nat Adderley) - 2:41
7. "She's a Little Doll" (Bill Schluger) - 2:40
8. "Running Upstairs" (S. Watts) - 1:48
9. "September Song" (Kurt Weill, Maxwell Anderson) - 2:30
10. "Gee, Baby, Ain't I Good to You" (Andy Razaf, Don Redman) - 2:18
11. ""D" Waltz" (Jimmy Heath) - 2:18
12. "Get Ready, Set, Jump!!!" (Al Cooper) - 2:25

== Personnel ==
- Junior Mance - piano
- John Audino, Pete Candoli, Don Fagerquist, Mannie Klein, Al Porcino, Ray Triscari - trumpet
- Milt Bernhart, Vern Friley, Lew McCreary - trombone
- George Roberts, Ken Shroyer - bass trombone
- Joe Comfort - bass
- Shelly Manne - drums
- Bob Bain (tracks 2–5 & 8–12), David Cavanaugh (tracks 1, 6 & 7) - arranger
