= That Lovin' Feelin' =

Studio album by Junior Mance
- Released: 1972
- Recorded: Spring 1972; New York City
- Genre: Jazz
- Label: Milestone; MSP 9041
- Producer: Orrin Keepnews

Junior Mance chronology
Dexter Gordon with Junior Mance at Montreux (1970)	That Lovin' Feelin' (1972)	The Junior Mance Touch (1973)

That Lovin' Feelin' is an album by jazz pianist Junior Mance which was released on the Milestone label in 1972.

== Reception ==
Professional ratings
Review scores
Source	Rating
Allmusic	3/5 stars
The Penguin Guide to Jazz Recordings	3/4 stars

The Allmusic site awarded the album 3 stars stating "That Lovin' Feelin' is essentially an album of acoustic-oriented jazz, but it is acoustic-oriented soul-jazz/hard bop that grooves in a funky, churchy, down-home fashion. Thankfully, That Lovin' Feelin' is not the sort of album that finds the artist playing note-for-note covers of rock and R&B hits and calling it "jazz" ...Although not quite essential, That Lovin' Feelin' is an enjoyable, swinging effort that deserves credit for having an interesting variety of material".

== Track listing ==
1. "You've Lost That Lovin' Feelin'" (Phil Spector, Barry Mann, Cynthia Weil) – 3:02
2. "Mean Old Frisco Blues" (Arthur Crudup) – 4:00
3. "Out South" (Junior Mance) – 2:46
4. "The Good Life" (Sacha Distel, Jack Reardon) – 4:14
5. "Cubano Chant" (Ray Bryant) – 2:42
6. "Boss Blues" (Mance) – 3:54
7. "Blowin' in the Wind" (Bob Dylan) – 2:42
8. "When Sunny Gets Blue" (Marvin Fisher, Jack Segal) – 5:07
9. "Lee's Lament" (Ron Collier) – 4:32

== Personnel ==
- Junior Mance – piano
- Bob Cranshaw – electric bass
- Harold Wing – drums
- Ralph MacDonald – percussion
