= The Tenor Scene =

Live album by The Eddie "Lockjaw" Davis and Johnny Griffin Quintet
- Released: 1961
- Recorded: January 6, 1961; Minton's Playhouse, New York City
- Genre: Jazz
- Label: Prestige; PRLP 7191
- Producer: Esmond Edwards

Eddie "Lockjaw" Davis chronology
The First Set (1961)	The Tenor Scene (1961)	The Late Show (1961)

Johnny Griffin chronology
The First Set (1961)	The Tenor Scene (1961)	The Late Show (1961)

The Tenor Scene (also released as The Breakfast Show) is a live album by saxophonists Eddie "Lockjaw" Davis and Johnny Griffin recorded at Minton's Playhouse in 1961 and released on the Prestige label.

== Reception ==
Professional ratings
Review scores
Source	Rating
AllMusic	3/5 stars
The Rolling Stone Jazz Record Guide	4/5 stars
The Penguin Guide to Jazz Recordings	4/4 stars

AllMusic awarded the album 3 stars with the review by Scott Yanow stating: "The straight-ahead music contains plenty of sparks; this was a classic group."

== Track listing ==
1. "Light and Lovely" (Eddie "Lockjaw" Davis, George Duvivier) - 11:33
2. "Straight, No Chaser" (Thelonious Monk) - 10:03
3. "Woody 'n' You" (Dizzy Gillespie) - 7:20
4. "Bingo Domingo" (Eddie "Lockjaw" Davis) - 4:33
5. "I'll Remember April" (Gene de Paul, Patricia Johnston, Don Raye) - 9:29

== Personnel ==
- Eddie "Lockjaw" Davis - tenor saxophone
- Johnny Griffin - tenor saxophone
- Junior Mance - piano
- Larry Gales - bass
- Ben Riley - drums
