= Happy Time (Junior Mance album) =

Studio album by Junior Mance
- Released: 1962
- Recorded: June 20, 1962; Plaza Sound Studios, New York City
- Genre: Jazz
- Length: 43:14
- Label: Jazzland; JLP 77
- Producer: Orrin Keepnews

Junior Mance chronology
Junior's Blues (1962)	Happy Time (1962)	Get Ready, Set, Jump!!! (1964)

Happy Times is an album by jazz pianist Junior Mance which was recorded in 1962 and released on the Jazzland label.

== Reception ==
Professional ratings
Review scores
Source	Rating
Down Beat	2/5 stars
Allmusic	4/5 stars
The Penguin Guide to Jazz Recordings	3.5/4 stars

Allmusic awarded the album 4 stars with the review by Al Campbell stating: "Pianist Junior Mance was in excellent company on this inspired 1962 session with bassist Ron Carter and drummer Mickey Roker. It's unfortunate this trio only recorded together on this one date as their unity propels the blues, gospel, and bebop ideas Mance consistently feeds them".

== Track listing ==
All compositions are by Junior Mance except where indicated.

1. "Happy Time" - 6:17
2. "Jitterbug Waltz" (Fats Waller) - 5:22
3. "Out South" - 5:28
4. "Tin Tin Deo" (Gil Fuller, Dizzy Gillespie, Chano Pozo) - 4:42
5. "For Dancers Only" (Sy Oliver, Don Raye, Vic Schoen) - 5:50
6. "Taggie's Tune" - 4:39
7. "Azure-Te" (Bill Davis, Donald Wolf) - 5:36
8. "The Simple Waltz" (Bob Brookmeyer, Clark Terry) - 5:20

== Personnel ==
- Junior Mance - piano
- Ron Carter - bass
- Mickey Roker - drums
