= Larry Gales =

American jazz musician

- Born: Lawrence Bernard Gales; March 25, 1936
- Died: September 12, 1995 (aged 59)
- Genre: Jazz
- Instrument: Double bass

Lawrence Bernard Gales (March 25, 1936 – September 12, 1995) was an American jazz double-bassist.

== Life ==
Gales began playing bass at age 11, and attended the Manhattan School of Music in the late 1950s. In that decade and the beginning of the next he worked with J.C. Heard, Eddie "Lockjaw" Davis, Johnny Griffin, Herbie Mann, Junior Mance, and Joe Williams. From 1964 to 1969 he was a member of the Thelonious Monk Quartet, where he recorded extensively and toured worldwide. After 1969, Gales relocated to Los Angeles, where he worked frequently on the local scene with Erroll Garner, Willie Bobo, Red Rodney, Sweets Edison, Benny Carter, Blue Mitchell, Clark Terry, and Kenny Burrell. He also recorded with Buddy Tate, Bennie Green, Sonny Stitt, Mary Lou Williams, Jimmy Smith, Sonny Criss, and Big Joe Turner, among others. His first session as a leader was released in 1990 on Candid Records; comprising one original and five Thelonious Monk tunes, the album was entitled A Message From Monk.

He died of leukemia in 1995, aged 59.

== Discography ==
=== As leader ===
- A Message from Monk (Candid, 1990)

=== As sideman ===
With Kenny Burrell

- When Lights Are Low (Concord Jazz, 1978)
- Kenny Burrell Live at the Village Vanguard (Muse, 1978 [1980])
- Kenny Burrell in New York (Muse, 1978 [1981])

With Sonny Criss

- Crisscraft (Muse, 1975)
- Out of Nowhere (Muse, 1976)

With Bennie Green

- Glidin' Along (Jazzland, 1961)

With Eddie "Lockjaw" Davis

- Afro-Jaws (Riverside, 1960)

With Johnny Griffin

- Tough Tenors (Jazzland, 1960) - with Eddie "Lockjaw" Davis
- The First Set (Prestige, 1961) - with Eddie "Lockjaw" Davis
- The Tenor Scene (Prestige, 1961) - with Eddie "Lockjaw" Davis
- The Late Show (Prestige, 1961) - with Eddie "Lockjaw" Davis
- The Midnight Show (Prestige, 1961) - with Eddie "Lockjaw" Davis
- Lookin' at Monk! (Jazzland, 1961) - with Eddie "Lockjaw" Davis
- Change of Pace (Riverside, 1961)
- Blues Up & Down (Jazzland, 1961) - with Eddie "Lockjaw" Davis

With Eddie Harris

- The Real Electrifying Eddie Harris (Mutt & Jeff, 1982)

With Johnny Lytle

- Swingin' at the Gate (Pacific Jazz, 1967)

With Junior Mance

- Junior Mance Trio at the Village Vanguard (Jazzland, 1961)

With Thelonious Monk

- Monk (Columbia, 1964)
- Live at the It Club (Columbia, 1964)
- Live at the Jazz Workshop (Columbia, 1964)
- Straight, No Chaser (Columbia, 1966)
- Underground (Columbia, 1968)
- Palo Alto (Impulse!, 2020).

With Charlie Rouse

- Bossa Nova Bacchanal (Blue Note, 1962)

With Sonny Stitt

- Stitt Goes Latin (Roost, 1963)
- Forecast: Sonny & Red (Catalyst, 1976) with Red Holloway

With Buddy Tate

- Tate-a-Tate (Swingville, 1960) with Clark Terry

With Eddie "Cleanhead" Vinson

- The "Clean" Machine (Muse, 1978)
