= I Believe to My Soul (album) =

Studio album by Junior Mance
- Released: February 1968
- Recorded: September 12, 1966, and August 3 & 4, 1967; New York City
- Genre: Jazz
- Length: 37:04
- Label: Atlantic; SD 1496
- Producer: Joel Dorn

Junior Mance chronology
Harlem Lullaby (1966)	I Believe to My Soul (1968)	The Good Life (1967)

I Believe to My Soul is an album by jazz pianist Junior Mance which was released on the Atlantic label in 1968.

== Reception ==
Professional ratings
Review scores
Source	Rating
Allmusic	3/5 stars

Allmusic awarded the album 3 stars with the review by Dave Nathan stating, "Mance never ventures far from that jazzy soulfulness which characterized his playing. This is a good representative recording by an artist who was never able to raise himself to the top tier of jazz pianists".

== Track listing ==
All compositions by Junior Mance except where indicated

1. "I Believe to My Soul" (Ray Charles) – 5:11
2. "A Time and a Place" (Jimmy Heath) – 5:07
3. "Sweet Georgia Brown" (Ben Bernie, Maceo Pinkard, Kenneth Casey) – 3:13
4. "Golden Spur" – 5:06
5. "Don't Worry 'Bout It" – 2:08
6. "Home on the Range" (Traditional) – 6:47
7. "Sweets for My Sweet" (Doc Pomus, Mort Shuman) – 5:41
8. "My Romance" (Richard Rodgers, Lorenz Hart) – 3:51

== Personnel ==
- Junior Mance – piano
- Melvin Lastie (track 5), Joe Newman (tracks 1, 5 & 7), Jimmy Owens (tracks 1 & 7) – trumpet
- David Newman (tracks 1, 5 & 7), Frank Wess (track 5) – tenor saxophone
- Hubert Laws – tenor saxophone, flute (tracks 1 & 7)
- Bobby Capers (tracks 1 & 7), Haywood Henry (track 5) – baritone saxophone
- Bob Cunningham (tracks 3 & 4), Richard Davis (tracks 2, 5, 6 & 8) – bass
- Jimmy Tyrell – electric bass (tracks 1 & 7)
- Alan Dawson (tracks 3 & 4), Ray Lucas (tracks 1 & 7), Freddie Waits (tracks 2, 5, 6 & 8) – drums
- Ray Barretto – congas (track 7)
- Sylvia Shemwell – vocals (tracks 1 & 7)
- Uunidentified string section conducted by Gene Orloff (track 6)
