= Bill Smith (Canadian musician) =

Canadian writer, editor, and musician

- Born: William Ernest Smith; 12 May 1938 (age 87); Bristol, England
- Genres: Jazz
- Occupations: Record producer, editor, writer
- Instruments: Saxophone, clarinet

William Ernest Smith (usually called Bill Smith) (born 12 May 1938) is a Canadian writer, editor, record producer, saxophonist, and clarinetist of English birth. He has served as the editor of CODA magazine since 1976, and is a co-founder of Sackville Records, a Canadian record label that specialized in jazz.

== Early life ==
Born in Bristol, England, Smith studied aeronautical design at the North Staffordshire Technical Institute, and played drums and trumpet in England, before moving to Toronto in 1963 when he became the art director of CODA, a jazz music magazine. In 1967, he was promoted to the role of co-publisher of CODA with John Norris. He succeeded Norris as editor of the magazine in 1976. In 1968, Smith and Norris co-founded Sackville Records, is a Canadian record label specializing in jazz music.

== Career ==
While working at CODA, Smith began seriously studying and performing jazz as a saxophonist and clarinetist in Toronto. He developed a modest, conversational style and began performing in freely improvised settings in the mid-1970s, first with pianist Stuart Broomer and percussionist John Mars in the jazz trio, Broomer, Mars & Smith. He then performed with his own jazz trio, the Bill Smith Ensemble (BSE) from 1980 to 1989. Other members of the BSE included violinist David Prentice and double bass player David Lee. The BSE recorded several albums, both as a trio and with guests Leo Smith and Joe McPhee.

Smith performed in London in April 1983 as "Four Nights of Canadian Improvised Music" with fellow Canadian saxophonist, Maury Coles, starting at the Seven Dials Jazz Club, Covent Garden, run by Matthew Wright of Ray's Jazz Shop. They were accompanied by local musicians Paul Rutherford (trombone), Paul Rogers (bass) and Nigel Morris (drums). This was followed by gigs at Club Extempore, Haverstock Hill, Club Improv, Conway Street and the New Merlin's Cave. Other musicians involved included Jim Dvorak, Roger Turner, Ollie Blanchflower, Marcio Mattos, Eddie Prevost, Elton Dean and Harrison Smith (no relation).

In addition to his work with the BSE, Smith performed as a sopranino saxophonist in Zes Winden (1986–88). He was also co-producer with Ron Mann of a feature-length documentary about the October Revolution in Jazz, Imagine the Sound (1981), and published a collection of his jazz photography and reminiscences, Imagine the Sound, no.5: The Book (Toronto, 1985). In 1989, Smith moved the editorial offices of CODA to Hornby Island, northwest of Vancouver, and thereafter played saxophone and drums locally. The magazine's business office remains in Toronto, under Norris.

== Discography ==
- CCMC, Music Gallery LP
- PICK A NUMBER Bill Smith Trio (David Lee and David Prentice), Onari LP
- CONVERSATIONS with Stuart Broomer
- RASTAFARI, Leo Smith with The Bill Smith Ensemble (Bill Smith, David Lee, David Prentice and Larry Potter), Sackville LP and CB
- ZES WINDEN, Zes Winden (with Bill Smith, John Tchicai, Dies Le Duc, Klaas Hekman, Ad Peijnenburg and Frans Vermeerssen), BVHaast LP

With Joe McPhee

- Visitation (Sackville, 1983 [1985]) LP and CD
