= The First Set =

Live album by The Eddie "Lockjaw" Davis and Johnny Griffin Quintet
- Released: 1964
- Recorded: January 6, 1961; Minton's Playhouse, New York City
- Genre: Jazz
- Label: Prestige; PRLP 7309
- Producer: Esmond Edwards

Eddie "Lockjaw" Davis chronology
Griff & Lock (1960)	The First Set (1964)	The Tenor Scene (1961)

Johnny Griffin chronology
Griff & Lock (1960)	The First Set (1964)	The Tenor Scene (1961)

The First Set is a live album by saxophonists Eddie "Lockjaw" Davis and Johnny Griffin recorded at Minton's Playhouse in 1961 and released on the Prestige label. The album was the second release from the recordings at Minton's after The Tenor Scene.

== Track listing ==
1. "Billie's Bounce" (Charlie Parker) - 8:43
2. "Epistrophy" (Thelonious Monk, Kenny Clarke) - 7:17
3. "Well, You Needn't" (Monk) - 8:58
4. "I'll Remember April" (Gene de Paul, Patricia Johnston, Don Raye) - 8:05

== Personnel ==
- Eddie "Lockjaw" Davis, Johnny Griffin - tenor saxophone
- Junior Mance - piano
- Larry Gales - bass
- Ben Riley - drums
