= Junior Mance =

American jazz pianist and composer (1928–2021)

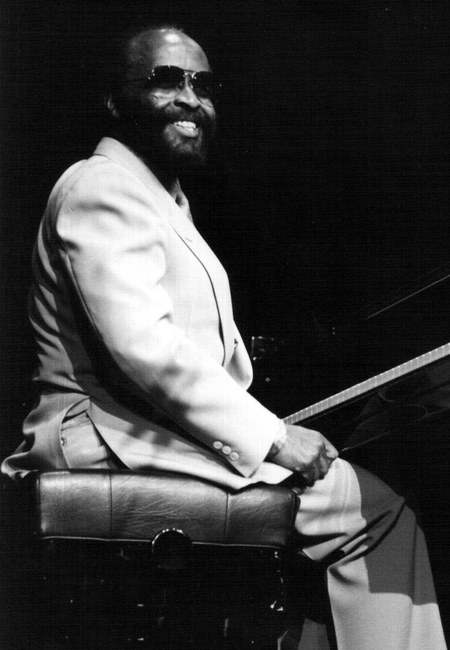
- Mance in 1980

Background information
- Born: Julian Clifford Mance, Jr. October 10, 1928; Evanston, Illinois, U.S.
- Died: January 17, 2021 (aged 92) New York City, U.S.
- Genres: Jazz, hard bop, Blues
- Occupations: Musician, composer
- Instrument: Piano
- Years active: 1947–2016
- Labels: Riverside, Capitol, Atlantic

Julian Clifford Mance, Jr. (October 10, 1928 – January 17, 2021), known as Junior Mance, was an American jazz pianist and composer.

== Biography ==
=== Early life (1928–1947) ===
Mance was born in Evanston, Illinois. When he was five years old, Mance started playing piano on an upright in his family's home in Evanston. His father, Julian, taught Mance to play stride piano and boogie-woogie. With his father's permission, Mance had his first professional gig in Chicago at the age of ten when his upstairs neighbor, a saxophone player, needed a replacement for a pianist who was ill. Mance was known to his family as "Junior" (to differentiate him from his father), and the nickname stuck with him throughout his professional career.

Mance's mother encouraged him to study medicine at nearby Northwestern University in Evanston, but agreed to let him attend Roosevelt College in Chicago instead. Despite urging him to enroll in pre-med classes, Mance signed up for music classes, though he found that jazz was forbidden by the faculty, and did not finish out the year.

=== Chicago and military service (1947–1953) ===
Mance first played with Gene Ammons in Chicago in 1947 while he was enrolled at Roosevelt. He recorded with Ammons on September 23 that year for Aladdin Records, and they worked in New York City during a week when Mance was suspended from school (having been caught playing jazz in a practice room). While on tour, Lester Young came to see Ammons play at the Congo Lounge in Chicago in 1949. Young's piano player, Bud Powell, had missed his flight to Chicago, and Young asked Mance to replace him, thinking Mance was a fill-in rather than Ammons' regular pianist. Having just been offered Stan Getz's chair in the Woody Herman band, Ammons was "delighted" to let Mance go. Mance recorded with Young for Savoy Records that year, and reunited with Ammons to record with Sonny Stitt for Prestige Records in 1950.

The U.S. Army drafted Mance in 1951. Two weeks before shipping out to Korea from basic training, Julian "Cannonball" Adderley helped Mance score a position in the 36th Army Band at Fort Knox, Kentucky, where he remained as the company clerk.

Discharged from the Army in 1953, Mance immediately started working at the Bee Hive Jazz Club in Chicago, completing the house rhythm section with Israel Crosby (bass) and Buddy Smith (drums). During his year at the Bee Hive, Mance backed musicians such as Charlie Parker, Coleman Hawkins, Eddie "Lockjaw" Davis, and Sonny Stitt.

=== New York City (1953–1959) ===
Charlie Parker encouraged Mance to move to New York, which he did after saving money from working nearly a year at the Bee Hive. In 1954, Mance was asked to record with Dinah Washington after Wynton Kelly was drafted. Mance toured with Washington over the next two years and learned accompaniment technique from Washington's arranger, Jimmy Jones. EmArcy released two LPs, Dinah Jams and Jam Session, from a live session recorded August 14–15, 1954 in Los Angeles with Mance, Washington, Clifford Brown, Clark Terry, Maynard Ferguson, Herb Geller, Harold Land, Richie Powell, Keter Betts, George Morrow, and Max Roach.

In 1956, Mance joined Cannonball Adderley's first civilian band, along with Nat Adderley, Sam Jones, and Jimmy Cobb. They made several recordings for EmArcy/Mercury over the next two years. Dinah Washington hired this group to back her on In the Land of Hi-Fi, and Mance also recorded sessions with Johnny Griffin, James Moody, and Wilbur Ware for Argo Records and Riverside during this period.

After the Adderley group broke up for lack of gigs, Adderley became part of the Miles Davis Sextet, while Mance joined Dizzy Gillespie's band, once again replacing Wynton Kelly. Mance backed Gillespie and Louis Armstrong during a televised performance of the song "Umbrella Man" on CBS in January 1959.

=== Debut as leader and later career (1959–2016) ===
Verve Records founder Norman Granz offered Mance his first recording date as leader during one of his sessions with Dizzy Gillespie. Granz set Mance up with bassist Ray Brown, and Gillespie's drummer Lex Humphries completed the trio, which recorded together in April 1959. His debut record Junior was released by Verve later that year. A busy release schedule followed, as Mance went on to record six albums for Jazzland/Riverside in the early '60s, and joined the Eddie "Lockjaw" Davis/Johnny Griffin quintet which released seven albums with Mance during 1960–1961.

Mance recorded for major labels Capitol (1964–1965) and Atlantic (1966–1970), including one date featuring Mance on harpsichord (Harlem Lullaby, 1966) and a fusion album (With a Lotta Help from My Friends, 1970). During a recording session with Benny Carter for the soundtrack to the film A Man Called Adam in 1965, Carter and Mance took in all three sets of an Ornette Coleman performance at the Five Spot Café. Mance cited Carter's broad-mindedness as an inspiration for his own stylistic explorations. Hansen House published his book How to Play Blues Piano in June 1967.

Junior Mance continued to record and perform during the next three decades, albeit at a less intense pace. He made several duet recordings with bassist Martin Rivera, and two solo piano recordings for Canadian label Sackville Records, Junior Mance Special and Jubilation. He also taught at The New School for Jazz and Contemporary Music for 23 years, counting Brad Mehldau and Larry Goldings among his students before retiring in 2011.

From 1990 to 2009 Mance was part of a group called "100 Gold Fingers" which frequently toured Japan. The rotating line-up of all star pianists included Toshiko Akiyoshi, Monty Alexander, Geri Allen, Lynne Arriale, Kenny Barron, Joanne Brackeen, Ray Bryant, Bill Charlap, Cyrus Chestnut, Gerald Clayton, João Donato, Tommy Flanagan, Don Friedman, Benny Green, Barry Harris, Gene Harris, Hank Jones, Duke Jordan, Roger Kellaway, John Lewis, Harold Mabern, Dave McKenna, Marian McPartland, Mulgrew Miller, Dado Moroni, Hod O'Brien, Eric Reed, Ted Rosenthal, Renee Rosnes, Mal Waldron, Cedar Walton, James Williams, and Chihiro Yamanaka, with bassist Bob Cranshaw and either Alan Dawson or Grady Tate on drums.

Mance and his wife Gloria formed their own record label, JunGlo, in 2007. Their first release, Live At Café Loup, featured Mance in a trio with Hidé Tanaka on bass and Jackie Williams on drums, with guest vocalist José James. Drummer Kim Garey later took over from Williams, with the addition of saxophonists Ryan Anselmi and Andrew Hadro. Mance toured the U.S., Italy, Japan, and Israel in 2013 accompanied by Tanaka and violinist Michi Fuji (a former New School student of Mance's.) This Mance trio held their Sunday night residency at Café Loup until his retirement in the spring of 2016.

He died in New York of a brain hemorrhage that he had suffered after a fall, aged 92. He had also been suffering from Alzheimer's.

== Discography ==
=== As leader ===
- Junior (Verve, 1959)
- The Soulful Piano of Junior Mance (Jazzland, 1960)
- Big Chief! (Jazzland, 1961)
- The Soul of Hollywood (Jazzland, 1962) – recorded in 1961–62
- Happy Time (Jazzland, 1962)
- Junior's Blues (Riverside, 1963) – recorded in 1962
- Get Ready, Set, Jump!!! (Capitol, 1964)
- Straight Ahead! (Capitol, 1964)
- That's Where It Is! (Capitol, 1965) – recorded in 1964
- Harlem Lullaby (Atlantic, 1967) – recorded in 1966
- The Good Life (Tuba, 1967) – recorded in 1965
- I Believe to My Soul (Atlantic, 1967) – recorded in 1966
- Live at the Top (Atlantic, 1968)
- With a Lotta Help from My Friends (Atlantic, 1970)
- That Lovin' Feelin' (Milestone, 1972)
- The Junior Mance Touch (Polydor, 1973)
- Holy Mama (East Wind, 1976)
- Deep (JSP, 1980)
- The Tender Touch of Junior Mance and Martin Rivera (Nilva, 1983)
- For Dancers Only (Sackville, 1983)
- Truckin' and Trakin' (Bee Hive, 1983)
- Junior Mance Special (Sackville, 1989) – recorded in 1986–88
- Here 'Tis (Sackville, 1992)
- Blue Mance (Chiaroscuro, 1995) – recorded in 1994
- Softly as in a Morning Sunrise (Enja, 1994)
- Milestones (Sackville, 1999) – recorded in 1997
- Mance (Chiaroscuro, 2000) – guests Etta Jones and Lou Donaldson. recorded in 1998.
- Yesterdays (M&I, 2002) – guest Eric Alexander. recorded in 2000.
- Groovin' Blues (M&I, 2002) with Eric Alexander – recorded in 2001
- On the Road (Trio, 2002) – live
- Blues Ballads And 'A' Train (Trio, 2003) – recorded in 2000
- Soul Eyes (M&I, 2004)
- The Shadow of Your Smile (Pony Canyon, 2006)
- Ballads (M&I, 2006)
- Groovin' With Junior (Sackville, 2008)
- Blue Minor (Mojo, 2008)
- For My Fans...It's All About You (Kickstarter, 2015)

=== Live albums ===
- Junior Mance Trio at the Village Vanguard (Jazzland, 1961)
- Live at the Top of the Gate (Atlantic, 1968)
- Live at Sweet Basil (Flying Disk, 1977)
- First: Live at 3361 Black (Tokuma, 2004) – recorded in 1984
- Second: Live at 3361 Black (Tokuma, 2004) – recorded in 1984
- At Town Hall, Vol. 1 (Enja, 1995)
- At Town Hall, Vol. 2 (Enja, 1995)
- Jubilation (Sackville, 1996) recorded in 1994
- Live at the 1995 Floating Jazz Festival (Chiaroscuro, 1996)
- Live at the 1996 Floating Jazz Festival (Chiaroscuro, 1997)
- Live at the 1997 Floating Jazz Festival (Chiaroscuro, 1998)
- Live at the 1998 Floating Jazz Festival (Chiaroscuro, 1999)
- Mance (Chiaroscuro, 2000) – recorded in 1998
- Opus de Funk (Absord, 2003) – recorded in 1991
- The Music of Thelonious Monk (Chiaroscuro, 2003) with Joe Temperley – recorded in 1996, 2000
- Live at Cafe Loup (JunGlo, 2007)
- Out South (JunGlo, 2010)
- Letter From Home (JunGlo, 2011)
- The Three of Us (JunGlo, 2012)

=== As sideman ===
With Cannonball Adderley

- In the Land of Hi-Fi with Julian Cannonball Adderley (EmArcy, 1956)
- Sophisticated Swing (EmArcy, 1957)
- Cannonball's Sharpshooters (EmArcy, 1958)

With Nat Adderley

- To the Ivy League from Nat (EmArcy, 1956)
- Little Big Horn! (Riverside, 1963)

With Gene Ammons

- Soulful Saxophone (Chess, 1959) – recorded in 1948-50
- Jug and Sonny (Chess, 1960) – recorded in 1948-51
- All Star Sessions (Prestige, 1956) – recorded in 1950-55
- The Boss Is Back! (Prestige, 1969)
- Brother Jug! (Prestige, 1969)
- Together Again for the Last Time (Prestige, 1976) with Sonny Stitt – recorded in 1973

With Dizzy Gillespie

- The Ebullient Mr. Gillespie (Verve, 1959)
- Have Trumpet, Will Excite! (Verve, 1959)
- Copenhagen Concert (1979) – recorded in 1959
- To Diz with Love (Telarc, 1992) – live

With Johnny Griffin

- Johnny Griffin (Argo, 1958) – recorded in 1956
- Tough Tenors (Jazzland, 1960) with Eddie "Lockjaw" Davis
- Griff & Lock (Jazzland, 1960) with Eddie "Lockjaw" Davis
- The First Set (Prestige, 1961) with Eddie "Lockjaw" Davis
- The Tenor Scene (Prestige, 1961) with Eddie "Lockjaw" Davis
- The Late Show (Prestige, 1961) with Eddie "Lockjaw" Davis
- The Midnight Show (Prestige, 1961) with Eddie "Lockjaw" Davis
- Lookin' at Monk! (Jazzland, 1961) with Eddie "Lockjaw" Davis

With Jimmy Scott

- The Source (Atlantic, 1969)
- Dream (Sire, 1994)

With Sonny Stitt

- Kaleidoscope (Prestige, 1957) – recorded in 1950-51
- Stitt's Bits (Prestige, 1958) – recorded in 1950
- The Matadors Meet the Bull (Roulette, 1965)
- The Last Stitt Sessions, Vol. 1 (Muse, 1982)

With Clark Terry

- Everything's Mellow (Moodsville, 1961)
- One on One (Chesky, 2000)

With Dinah Washington

- After Hours with Miss "D" (EmArcy, 1954)
- Dinah Jams (EmArcy, 1955) – recorded in 1954
- In the Land of Hi-Fi (EmArcy, 1956)

With Joe Williams

- At Newport '63 (RCA, 1963)
- Me and the Blues (RCA, 1964)
- Havin' a Good Time (Hyena, 2005) – live recorded in 1964

With others

- Ernie Andrews, No Regrets (Muse, 1992)
- Art Blakey, Hard Drive (Bethlehem, 1957)
- Clifford Brown, Jam Session (EmArcy, 1954)
- Benny Carter, A Man Called Adam (Original Soundtrack) (Reprise, 1966)
- Jimmy Cleveland, A Map of Jimmy Cleveland (Mercury, 1959)
- Arnett Cobb, Keep On Pushin' (Bee Hive, 1984)
- Ray Crawford, Smooth Groove (Candid, 1988) – recorded in 1961
- Harry "Sweets" Edison, Live at the Iridium (Telarc, 1997)
- Paul Gonsalves, Jazz School (EmArcy, 1956)
- Virgil Gonsalves, Jazz at Monterey (Omega, 1959)
- Dexter Gordon, Dexter Gordon with Junior Mance at Montreux (Prestige, 1970)
- Joe Gordon, Introducing Joe Gordon (EmArcy, 1955) – recorded in 1954
- Bennie Green, Glidin' Along (Jazzland, 1961)
- Al Grey, Centerpiece: Live at the Blue Note (Telarc, 1995)
- Buddy Guy, Buddy & the Juniors (MCA, 1970)
- Aretha Franklin, Soul '69 (Atlantic, 1969)
- Red Holloway, Standing Room Only (Chiaroscuro, 2000) – recorded in 1998
- José James, The Dreamer (Brownswood Recordings, 2008)
- Eddie Jefferson, Letter From Home (Riverside, 1962)
- Etta Jones, Etta Jones Sings (Roulette, 1966) – recorded in 1965
- Irene Kral, Better Than Anything (Äva, 1963)
- Jay Leonhart, Great Duets (Chiaroscuro, 1999)
- Les McCann, Comment (Atlantic, 1970) – recorded in 1969
- Howard McGhee, The Sharp Edge (Fontana, 1961)
- The Metronomes, Something Big (Jazzland, 1962)
- James Moody, Last Train from Overbrook (Argo, 1958)
- Wild Bill Moore, Wild Bill's Beat (Jazzland, 1961)
- Barbara Morrison, Live at the Dakota, Volume 2 (Dakota, 2005) – live
- Sandy Mosse, Relaxin' with Sandy Mosse (Argo, 1959)
- Leo Parker, 1947–1950 (Classic, 2002) – 78 rpm singles recorded for Savoy in 1947
- Ken Peplowski, Illuminations (Concord Jazz, 1991)
- Billie Poole, Confessin' the Blues (Riverside, 1963)
- Bernard "Pretty" Purdie, Soul to Jazz II (Act, 1997)
- Alvin Queen, Glidin' and Stridin' (Nilva, 1981)
- Arnold Sterling, Here's Brother Sterling (Jam, 1982)
- Frank Vignola, Appel Direct (Concord Jazz, 1993)
- Wilbur Ware, The Chicago Sound (Riverside, 1957)
- Ben Webster, Live at Pio's (Enja, 1963) – live
- Marion Williams, The New Message (Atlantic, 1969)
- Leo Wright, Blues Shout (Atlantic, 1960)
- Lester Young,The Immortal Lester Young - Blue Lester (Savoy, 1949)
