= Sackville Records =

Canadian record company and label

- Founded: 1968
- Founder: John Norris; Bill Smith
- Genre: Jazz
- Country of origin: Canada
- Location: Toronto, Ontario

Sackville Records was a Canadian record company and label that specialized in jazz. In 2011, with Sackville defunct, Delmark Records acquired its catalogue.

Sackville was founded in 1968 in Toronto, Ontario, Canada by John Norris and Bill Smith of the jazz magazine CODA. The bulk of the label's new releases were from sessions recorded in Canada. It has also done reissues. In the 1990s it became the distributor for American Music, Chiaroscuro, Nagel-Heyer, Classics, Storyville, and Timeless.

Its catalogue included Doc Cheatham, Don Ewell, Art Hodes, Keith Ingham, Geoffrey Keezer, Humphrey Lyttelton, Harold Mabern, Junior Mance, Jay McShann, Don Menza, Sammy Price, Don Pullen, Frank Rosolino, Archie Shepp, Ralph Sutton, and Buddy Tate.

== Roster ==
- Ian Bargh
- Ed Bickert
- Ruby Braff
- Anthony Braxton
- Doc Cheatham
- Don Ewell
- Jim Galloway
- Sonny Greenwich
- Herb Hall
- Milt Hinton
- Art Hodes
- Steve Holt
- Keith Ingham
- JMOG
- Geoff Keezer
- Humphrey Lyttelton
- Harold Mabern
- Junior Mance
- George Masso
- Jay McShann
- Don Menza
- Sammy Price
- Don Pullen
- Red Richards
- Frank Rosolino
- Andrew Scott
- Archie Shepp
- Willie "The Lion" Smith
- Ralph Sutton
- Barbara Sutton Curtis
- Buddy Tate
- Charles Thompson
