= Coda (magazine) =

Bygone Canadian jazz magazine

- Former editors: John Norris, Bill Smith
- Categories: Music magazine
- Frequency: Bimonthly
- Founder: John Norris
- Founded: 1958
- Final issue: 2009
- Country: Canada
- Based in: Toronto, Ontario
- Language: English
- ISSN: 0010-017X

Coda was a Canadian magazine covering jazz and related topics. The magazine produced six publications a year on a bi-monthly basis. Founded in 1958 by publisher and record producer John Norris, the magazine contained reviews and articles about jazz artists active internationally, as well as articles on jazz recordings, jazz books, and other topics related to jazz. In 1976, Norris was succeeded as editor by saxophonist Bill Smith.
