= John Norris (publisher) =

Canadian publisher and editor (1934–2010)

John Norris (1934 – January 31, 2010) was a British-born Canadian publisher and editor. Norris founded Coda magazine.

Born in the United Kingdom he later moved to Canada where he opened up a jazz club. In 1962 Norris founded Coda magazine. He was editor until 1976 when Bill Smith took over. In 1968 Norris and Smith founded Sackville Recordings.

Norris died on January 31, 2010, after suffering with a heart condition.
