= Minton's Playhouse =

Jazz club and bar in New York City

- U.S. National Register of Historic Places
- New York State Register of Historic Places
- New York City Landmark
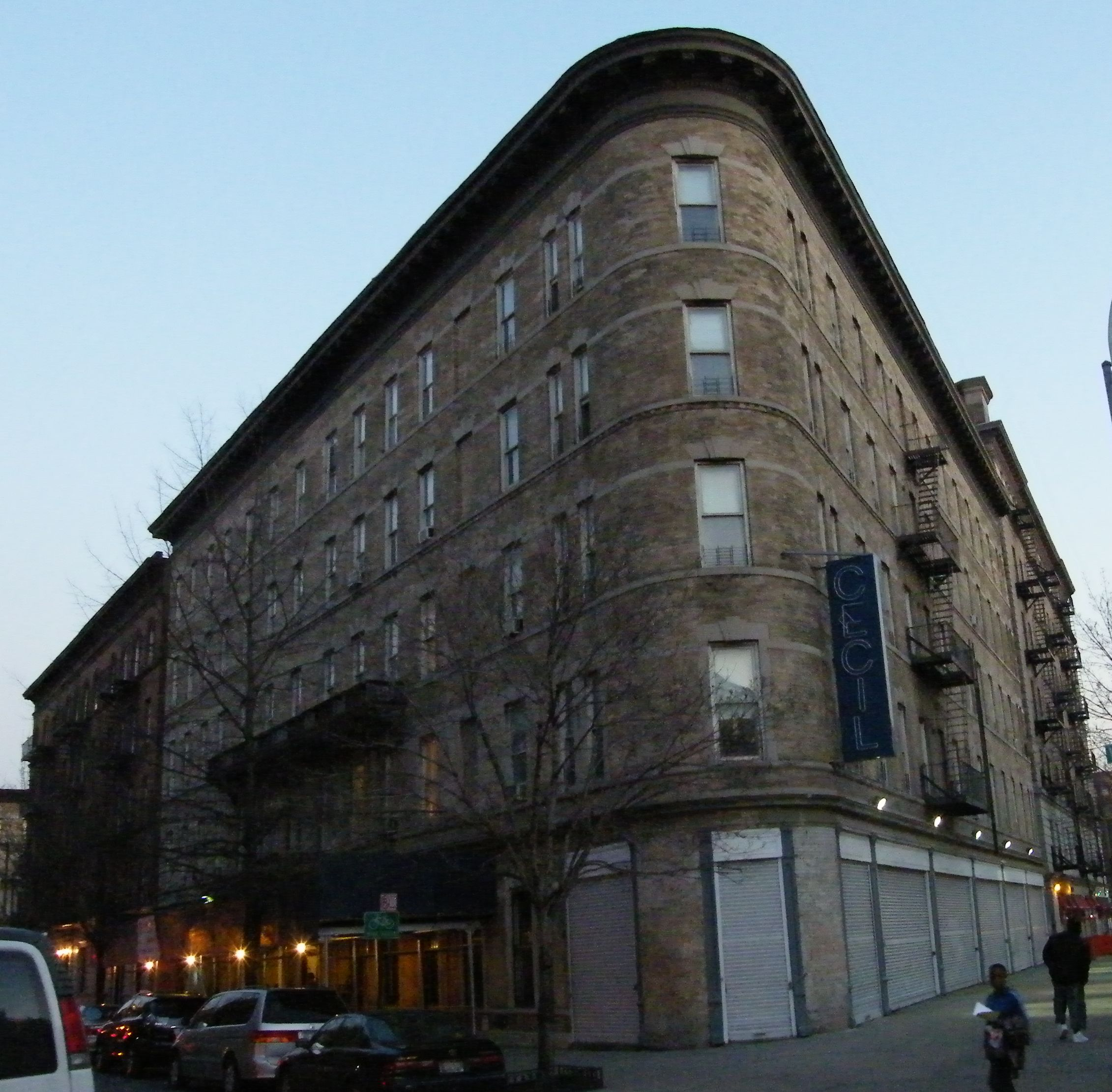

- Location within Manhattan Location within New York City Location within New York Location within the United States
- Interactive map of Minton's Playhouse
- Location: 206—210 West 118th Street, Manhattan, New York, US
- Coordinates: 40°48′17″N 73°57′12″W
- Area: less than one acre
- Architectural style: Late 19th And 20th Century Revivals, Second Renaissance Revival
- NRHP reference No.: 85002423
- NYSRHP No.: 06101.001800
- NYCL No.: 2671

Significant dates
- Added to NRHP: September 18, 1985
- Designated NYSRHP: August 12, 1985
- Designated NYCL: June 27, 2023

Minton's Playhouse is a jazz club and bar located on the first floor of the Cecil Hotel at 210 West 118th Street in Harlem, Manhattan, New York City. It is a registered trademark of Housing and Services, Inc., a New York City nonprofit provider of supportive housing. The door to the club is at 206 West 118th Street and is marked by a small plaque. Minton's was founded by tenor saxophonist Henry Minton in 1938. Minton's is known for its role in the development of modern jazz, particularly bebop. Thelonious Monk, Bud Powell, Kenny Clarke, Charlie Christian, Charlie Parker and Dizzy Gillespie pioneered be-bop in the club's jam sessions in the early 1940s. Minton's thrived for three decades until its decline near the end of the 1960s, and it eventually closed in 1974. After being closed for more than 30 years, the newly remodeled club reopened on May 19, 2006, under the name Uptown Lounge at Minton's Playhouse. Minton's operated until 2010, before re-opening as Minton's Playhouse in 2013.

== Beginnings ==
Minton's original owner, Henry Minton, was known in Harlem for being the first ever black delegate to the American Federation of Musicians Local 802. In addition, he had been the manager of the Rhythm Club, in Harlem, in the early part of the 1930s, a venue which Louis Armstrong, Fats Waller, James P. Johnson, and Earl Hines frequented. The novelist Ralph Ellison later wrote that because of his union background and music business experience, Minton was aware of the economic and artistic needs of jazz musicians in New York in the late 1930s. Minton's popularity and his penchant for generosity with food and loans made his club a favorite hang-out for musicians.

Minton developed a policy of holding regular jam sessions at his club, which would later prove to be a significant factor in the development of bebop. Because of his union ties, Minton was able to ensure that musicians would not be fined for their participation in jam sessions, an activity that was prohibited by the union. Dizzy Gillespie recalled that there were "walking" delegates from the union that would follow musicians around and fine them "a hundred to five hundred dollars" for participating in jam sessions, but that they were "somewhat immune from this at Minton's because of Henry Minton". According to Ralph Ellison, Minton's Playhouse provided "a retreat, a homogeneous community where a collectivity of common experience could find continuity and meaningful expression".

== 1940s ==
In late 1940, Minton hired Teddy Hill, a former bandleader, to manage the club. Building in the same direction that Minton had started, Hill used his connections from the Savoy Ballroom (where his band used to play), and the Apollo Theater to increase the interest in the club. Hill put together the house band which included Thelonious Monk on piano, Joe Guy on trumpet, Nick Fenton on bass, and Kenny Clarke on drums. Both Clarke and Guy were in Teddy Hill's band before it disbanded in 1939. According to Clarke, Teddy Hill wanted to "do something for the guys that had worked with him" by giving them work during difficult times. The house band at Minton's in 1941, with the addition of frequent guests, Dizzy Gillespie and Charlie Christian, was at the center of the emergence of bebop in the early 1940s. Later, the band was led by tenor saxophonist Kermit Scott.

== Monday celebrity nights ==
A feature of Minton's Playhouse during Teddy Hill's tenure as manager was the Monday Celebrity Nights sponsored by the Schiffmans who owned the nearby Apollo Theater. The Schiffmans treated their performers to free dinner and drinks after the conclusion of a long week of work. The food at Minton's became almost as popular as the music as noted by many present at that time. In an interview with Al Fraser (1979), Dizzy Gillespie told his recollection of Monday nights at Minton's:

On Monday nights, we used to have a ball. Everybody from the Apollo, on Monday nights, was a guest at Minton's, the whole band. We had a big jam session. Monday night was the big night, the musician's night off. There was always some food there for you. Oh, that part was beautiful. Teddy Hill treated the guys well.

== Cutting sessions and duels ==
During the Monday Celebrity Nights, many guest musicians such as Roy Eldridge, Hot Lips Page, Ben Webster, Don Byas, and Lester Young would sit in. The trumpet duels between Roy Eldridge and Dizzy Gillespie became legendary, with Gillespie eventually surpassing his mentor. Speaking to Al Fraser, Gillespie recalled how Thelonious Monk one night teased Eldridge after being out-played by Gillespie saying, "Look, you're supposed to be the greatest trumpet player in the world ... but that's the best." Eldridge was an established musician in the older swing style, but he was an active figure at Minton's and contributed through his encouragement of Gillespie and Clarke to further their explorations.

Eldridge and the other swing musicians who participated in the early cutting sessions at Minton's played an important role in the evolution of swing toward bebop by inspiring the next generation of musicians. A young Sonny Stitt witnessed the great battles between the master saxophonists of the day in the early 1940s:

Can you imagine Lester Young, Coleman Hawkins, Chu Berry, Don Byas, and Ben Webster on the same little jam session? They had a place called Minton's Playhouse in New York. It's kaput now. And these guys, man, nothing like it. And guess who won the fight? ... Don Byas walked off with everything.

Byas was one of the first tenor saxophonists to assimilate bebop into his style, in contrast to Young, Hawkins, and Webster, who stayed close to their swing roots through the development of bebop.

Herman Pritchard, who tended bar at Minton's "in the old days", would watch as Ben Webster and Lester Young would "fight on those saxophones ... like dogs in the road". Ralph Ellison believes that what was occurring at Minton's from 1941 to 1942 was a "continuing symposium of jazz, a summation of all the styles, personal and traditional, of jazz".

== Charlie Christian and the house band ==
One of the pioneers of the new style, which would eventually become known as bebop, was the young electric guitarist from Benny Goodman's band, Charlie Christian. He played nightly at Minton's and was one of its stars. Christian was in his mid-twenties in 1941; his time at Minton's was significant, but brief; he would die the following March suffering from tuberculosis in a sanatorium. As evidenced by recordings made by Columbia University student Jerry Newman in 1941, Christian's playing was breaking new ground. Gunther Schuller's assessment of Christian's playing on those recordings is as follows:

His work here seems to me relentlessly creative, endlessly fertile, and is so in a way that marks a new stylistic departure. Indeed, it signals the birth of a new language in jazz, which even [Charlie] Parker did not have as clearly in focus at that time.

Kenny Clarke and the band at Minton's would look forward with anticipation to Christian's arrival after finishing his set with Goodman. Christian was admired by his peers at Minton's, including Thelonious Monk who "loved listening to Charlie play solos with fluid lines and interesting harmonies". Hill bought Christian an amplifier to use so he would not have to bring his along. Hill retained it up until his death in 1978.

== Bird and Dizzy ==
Soon after Charlie Christian's death, alto saxophonist Charlie Parker emerged as a new leader of the bebop movement. Parker's collaboration with Dizzy Gillespie, Thelonious Monk and Kenny Clarke, at sessions at Minton's, would build on the earlier experiments of Christian. Before 1942, Parker was known to have spent more time at Clark Monroe's Uptown House, another Harlem club where jam sessions extended into the early morning than he spent playing at Minton's. After leaving Jay McShann's band at the end of 1941, Parker joined Earl Hines's band in 1942 and was reunited with Dizzy Gillespie, whom he had met sometime earlier. It was during this period of time starting in 1942 that Parker, nicknamed 'Bird', could be found sitting-in at Minton's on Monday nights as recalled by Miles Davis:

On Monday nights at Minton's, Bird and Dizzy would come in to jam, so you'd have a thousand [players] up there trying to get in so they could listen to and play with Bird and Dizzy. But most of the musicians in the know didn't even think about playing when Bird and Dizzy came to jam. We would just sit out in the audience, to listen and learn.

Parker never was officially a member of the house band at Minton's during that period. However, sensing his importance to the bebop movement, Clarke and Monk approached Teddy Hill about hiring Parker into the band. Hill refused so Clarke and Monk decided to pay Parker out of their salaries.

After Parker's arrival on the scene in Harlem, other new players followed. Miles Davis, Fats Navarro, Dexter Gordon, Art Blakey, Max Roach and many others were drawn to Minton's. Miles Davis's search for Charlie Parker brought him to Minton's where he "cut his teeth" at the jam sessions. Davis remembered:

The way [it] went down up at Minton's was you brought your horn and hoped that Bird and Dizzy would invite you to play with them up on stage. And when this happened you better not blow it ... People would watch for clues from Bird and Dizzy, and if they smiled when you finished playing, then that meant your playing was good.

== Sitting-in ==
The house band at Minton's Playhouse developed ways of weeding out less skilled musicians who wanted to sit in. According to bassist Milt Hinton, Gillespie prompted the band to play standards, such as Gershwin's "I Got Rhythm", in difficult keys in order to discourage beginners from sitting in. Bassist Charles Mingus remembered being required to audition to get up on stage:

To play at Minton's you couldn't just walk in and grab a bass. They made you go in a back room or a kitchen and call a few tunes. They did it to me too. They said, "Can you play 'Perdido'? Can you play 'Body and Soul'?"

Practices such as these challenged up-and-coming jazz musicians to get their acts together in order to participate in the jam sessions, which kept the music at a high level.

== End of an era ==
Minton's changed its open jam policy in favor of big-name acts in the 1950s. By the late 1960s, bands were no longer at the cutting edge. Harlem writer, Amiri Baraka (LeRoi Jones) wrote in Black Music (1967): "The groups that come into Minton's are stand-up replicas of what was a highly experimental twenty-five years ago." Although the club was open for a little more than three decades, Minton's Playhouse will always be associated with the 1940s and the jam sessions that gave birth to bebop. Minton's thrived for three decades until its decline near the end of the 1960s, and its eventual closure in 1974.

== Revival ==
After being closed for more than 30 years, the newly remodeled club reopened on May 19, 2006, under the name Uptown Lounge at Minton's Playhouse. However, the reopened club was closed again in 2010.

In 2013, Richard Parsons revived Minton's as an upscale jazz club and restaurant.The reopening attracted a new generation of jazz talent to the space. Pianist and bandleader J.C. Hopkins, whose J.C. Hopkins Biggish Band secured a weekly Saturday night residency at the revived club, commemorated the venue's return with the 2017 album Meet Me at Minton's (Harlem Jazz Records), recorded with vocalists including Jon Hendricks, Andy Bey, Jazzmeia Horn, and Brianna Thomas. The restaurant's cuisine was entrusted to restaurant owner Alexander Smalls. The new club was designed by architect Sarah Garcia of Estudio Sarah Garcia and a new brand identity designed by New York designer John Simoudis.

The New York City Landmarks Preservation Commission designated the Hotel Cecil and Minton's Playhouse as a city landmark on June 27, 2023.

== See also ==
- List of jazz clubs
- Midnight at Minton's – 1941 Jerry Newman recording of a session featuring Don Byas and Thelonious Monk
- Up at "Minton's" - 1961 live album by Stanley Turrentine
