= Riverside Records discography =

This discography of the Riverside Records label includes the two principal 12-inch LP series. The main label's mono series had a 12- (later RLP 12-) prefix and the RLP 1100 series consisted of stereo issues (not given here) of albums also released in mono. The Jazzland subsidiary is also listed, but the earlier 10" series are omitted. They principally were the 1000 series of reissues of early jazz, and the 2500 series of new recordings unrestricted to a single style. Albums issued on the subsidiary Battle (largely gospel), Judson and Washington labels are also omitted, as are the 100 series (12-inch reissues of early jazz), 600 series (folk music), and 800 series (primarily folk, cabaret, and comedy).

== Discography ==
=== 200 series ===
| Catalog number | Year | Artist | Title | Notes |
|---|---|---|---|---|
| RLP 12-201 | 1955 | Thelonious Monk | Thelonious Monk Plays the Music of Duke Ellington | |
| RLP 12-202 | 1955 | Joe Sullivan | New Solos by an Old Master | |
| RLP 12-203 | 1956 | Randy Weston | Get Happy with the Randy Weston Trio | |
| RLP 12-204 | 1956 | Mundell Lowe | The Mundell Lowe Quartet | |
| RLP 12-205 | 1956 | Tony Parenti | Ragtime! | |
| RLP 12-206 | 1956 | Marty Bell & Don Elliott | The Voice of Marty Bell – The Quartet of Don Elliott | |
| RLP 12-207 | 1956 | George Lewis | Jazz in the Classic New Orleans Tradition | |
| RLP 12-208 | 1956 | Mundell Lowe | Guitar Moods | |
| RLP 12-209 | 1956 | Thelonious Monk | The Unique Thelonious Monk | |
| RLP 12-210 | 1956 | Gene Mayl | Dixieland in Hi Fi | |
| RLP 12-211 | 1956 | Wild Bill Davison | Sweet and Hot | |
| RLP 12-212 | 1956 | Ralph Sutton | Classic Jazz Tradition | |
| RLP 12-213 | 1956 | Bob Helm & Lu Watters | Riverside Roustabouts | |
| RLP 12-214 | 1956 | Randy Weston | With These Hands... | |
| RLP 12-215 | 1956 | Conrad Janis | Dixieland Jam Session | |
| RLP 12-216 | 1956 | Sidney Bechet | Creole Reeds | |
| RLP 12-217 | 1956 | Paul Barbarin & Sharkey | New Orleans Contrasts | |
| RLP 12-218 | 1956 | Don Elliot & Rusty Dedrick | Counterpoint for Six Valves | |
| RLP 12-219 | 1956 | Mundell Lowe | New Music of Alec Wilder | |
| RLP 12-220 | 1956 | Bob Corwin | The Bob Corwin Quartet featuring the Trumpet of Don Elliott | |
| RLP 12-221 | 1956 | Matthew Gee | Jazz by Gee | |
| RLP 12-222 | 1956 | Ernie Henry | Presenting Ernie Henry | |
| RLP 12-223 | 1957 | Bill Evans | New Jazz Conceptions | |
| RLP 12-224 | 1956 | Kenny Drew | Kenny Drew Trio | |
| RLP 12-225 | 1957 | Trigger Alpert | Trigger Happy! | |
| RLP 12-226 | 1957 | Thelonious Monk | Brilliant Corners | |
| RLP 12-227 | 1957 | Randy Weston | Trio and Solo | |
| RLP 12-228 | 1957 | Zoot Sims | Zoot! | |
| RLP 12-229 | 1957 | Gigi Gryce | Gigi Gryce and the Jazz Lab Quintet | |
| RLP 12-230 | 1957 | George Lewis | Jazz at Vespers | |
| RLP 12-231 | 1957 | Carl Halen | Gin Bottle Jazz | |
| RLP 12-232 | 1957 | Randy Weston | Jazz à la Bohemia | |
| RLP 12-233 | 1957 | Coleman Hawkins | The Hawk Flies High | |
| RLP 12-234 | 1957 | Herbie Mann | Sultry Serenade | |
| RLP 12-235 | 1957 | Thelonious Monk | Thelonious Himself | |
| RLP 12-236 | 1957 | Kenny Drew | This Is New | |
| RLP 12-237 | 1957 | Clark Terry | Serenade to a Bus Seat | |
| RLP 12-238 | 1957 | Mundell Lowe | A Grand Night for Swinging | |
| RLP 12-239 | 1957 | Kenny Dorham | Jazz Contrasts | |
| RLP 12-240 | 1957 | Bobby Jaspar | With George Wallington, Idrees Sulieman | |
| RLP 12-241 | 1957 | Sonny Rollins | The Sound of Sonny | |
| RLP 12-242 | 1957 | Thelonious Monk | Monk's Music | |
| RLP 12-243 | 1957 | Various artists | Blues for Tomorrow | |
| RLP 12-244 | 1957 | Various artists | Jazz for Lovers | |
| RLP 12-245 | 1957 | Herbie Mann | Great Ideas of Western Mann | |
| RLP 12-246 | 1957 | Clark Terry | Duke with a Difference | |
| RLP 12-247 | 1957 | Thelonious Monk & Gerry Mulligan | Mulligan Meets Monk | |
| RLP 12-248 | 1957 | Ernie Henry | Seven Standards and a Blues | |
| RLP 12-249 | 1958 | Kenny Drew | Pal Joey | |
| RLP 12-250 | 1958 | Freddie Redd | San Francisco Suite | |
| RLP 12-251 | 1958 | Abbey Lincoln | That's Him! | |
| RLP 12-252 | 1958 | Wilbur Ware | The Chicago Sound | |
| RLP 12-253 | 1958 | Dick Johnson | Most Likely | |
| RLP 12-254 | 1958 | Wynton Kelly | Piano | |
| RLP 12-255 | 1958 | Kenny Dorham | 2 Horns / 2 Rhythm | |
| RLP 12-256 | 1958 | Benny Golson | The Modern Touch | |
| RLP 12-257 | 1958 | Toots Thielemans | Man Bites Harmonica! | |
| RLP 12-258 | 1958 | Sonny Rollins | Freedom Suite | |
| RLP 12-259 | 1958 | Dixieland Rhythm Kings | At the Hi Fi Jazz Band Ball | |
| RLP 12-260 | 1958 | Red Onion Jazz Band | Dance Off Both Your Shoes | |
| RLP 12-261 | 1958 | Carl Halen | Whoopee Makers' Jazz | |
| RLP 12-262 | 1958 | Thelonious Monk | Thelonious in Action | |
| RLP 12-263 | 1958 | Evans Bradshaw | Look Out for Evans Bradshaw! | |
| RLP 12-264 | 1958 | Johnny Griffin | Johnny Griffin Sextet | |
| RLP 12-265 | 1958 | Pepper Adams | 10 to 4 at the 5 Spot | |
| RLP 12-266 | 1958 | Ernie Henry | Last Chorus | |
| RLP 12-267 | 1958 | Various artists | Riverside Drive | |
| RLP 12-268 | 1958 | Marty Grosz | Hooray for Bix! | |
| RLP 12-269 | 1958 | Cannonball Adderley | Portrait of Cannonball | |
| RLP 12-270 | 1958 | Joe Albany & Warne Marsh | The Right Combination | |
| RLP 12-271 | 1958 | Clark Terry Quartet with Thelonious Monk | In Orbit | |
| RLP 12-272 | 1958 | Various artists | Eight Ways to Jazz Cole Porter | |
| RLP 12-273 | 1958 | Blue Mitchell | Big 6 | |
| RLP 12-274 | 1958 | Johnny Griffin | Way Out! | |
| RLP 12-275 | 1958 | Kenny Dorham | This Is the Moment! | |
| RLP 12-276 | 1958 | John Benson Brooks | Alabama Concerto | |
| RLP 12-277 | 1958 | Abbey Lincoln | It's Magic | |
| RLP 12-278 | 1958 | Chet Baker | (Chet Baker Sings) It Could Happen to You | |
| RLP 12-279 | 1958 | Thelonious Monk | Misterioso | |
| RLP 12-280 | 1958 | Max Roach | Deeds, Not Words | |
| RLP 12-281 | 1958 | Chet Baker | Chet Baker in New York | |
| RLP 12-282 | 1958 | Philly Joe Jones | Blues for Dracula | |
| RLP 12-283 | 1958 | George Lewis | George Lewis of New Orleans | |
| RLP 12-284 | 1958 | Various artists | Saxophone Revolt | |
| RLP 12-285 | 1958 | Nat Adderley | Branching Out | |
| RLP 12-286 | 1959 | Cannonball Adderley | Things Are Getting Better | |
| RLP 12-287 | 1959 | Ahmed Abdul-Malik | Jazz Sahara | |
| RLP 12-188 | N/A | Unissued | Unissued | |
| RLP 12-289 | 1959 | Dixieland Rhythm Kings | Jazz in Retrospect | |
| RLP 12-290 | 1959 | Benny Golson | The Other Side of Benny Golson | |
| RLP 12-291 | 1959 | Bill Evans | Everybody Digs Bill Evans | |
| RLP 12-292 | 1959 | Chet Baker | Chet Baker Introduces Johnny Pace | |
| RLP 12-293 | 1959 | Blue Mitchell | Out of the Blue | |
| RLP 12-294 | 1959 | Various artists | New Blue Horns | |
| RLP 12-295 | 1959 | Clark Terry | Top and Bottom Brass | |
| RLP 12-296 | 1959 | Evans Bradshaw | Pieces of Eighty-Eight | |
| RLP 12-297 | 1959 | Kenny Dorham | Blue Spring | |
| RLP 12-298 | 1959 | Wynton Kelly | Kelly Blue | |
| RLP 12-299 | 1959 | Chet Baker | Chet | |
| RLP 12-300 | 1959 | Thelonious Monk | The Thelonious Monk Orchestra at Town Hall | |

=== 300 series ===
| Catalog number | Year | Artist | Title | Notes |
|---|---|---|---|---|
| RLP 12-301 | 1959 | Nat Adderley | Much Brass | |
| RLP 12-302 | 1959 | Philly Joe Jones | Drums Around the World | |
| RLP 12-303 | 1959 | Cannonball Adderley | Cannonball Takes Charge | |
| RLP 12-304 | 1959 | Johnny Griffin | The Little Giant | |
| RLP 12-305 | 1959 | Thelonious Monk | 5 by Monk by 5 | |
| RLP 12-306 | 1959 | Billy Taylor | Billy Taylor with Four Flutes | |
| RLP 12-307 | 1959 | Chet Baker | Chet Baker Plays the Best of Lerner and Loewe | |
| RLP 12-308 | 1959 | Abbey Lincoln | Abbey Is Blue | |
| RLP 12-309 | 1959 | Blue Mitchell | Blue Soul | |
| RLP 12-310 | 1959 | Wes Montgomery | The Wes Montgomery Trio | |
| RLP 12-311 | 1959 | Cannonball Adderley | The Cannonball Adderley Quintet in San Francisco | |
| RLP 12-312 | 1960 | Thelonious Monk | Thelonious Alone in San Francisco | |
| RLP 12-313 | 1960 | Philly Joe Jones | Showcase | |
| RLP 12-314 | 1960 | Jimmy Heath | The Thumper | |
| RLP 12-315 | 1960 | Bill Evans | Portrait in Jazz | |
| RLP 12-316 | 1960 | Julian Priester | Keep Swingin' | |
| RLP 12-317 | 1960 | Bobby Timmons | This Here Is Bobby Timmons | |
| RLP 12-318 | 1960 | Nat Adderley | Work Song | |
| RLP 12-319 | 1960 | Billy Taylor | Uptown | |
| RLP 12-320 | 1960 | Wes Montgomery | The Incredible Jazz Guitar of Wes Montgomery | |
| RLP 12-321 | 1960 | John Lee Hooker | That's My Story | |
| RLP 12-322 | 1960 | Cannonball Adderley | Them Dirty Blues | |
| RLP 12-323 | 1960 | Thelonious Monk | Thelonious Monk at the Blackhawk | |
| RLP 12-324 | 1960 | Sam Jones | The Soul Society | |
| RLP 325 | 1960 | Yusef Lateef | The Three Faces of Yusef Lateef | |
| RLP 326 | 1960 | Barry Harris | Barry Harris at the Jazz Workshop | |
| RLP 12-327 | 1960 | James Clay and David Newman | The Sound of the Wide Open Spaces!!!! | |
| RLP 328 | 1960 | Bev Kelly | Love Locked Out | |
| RLP 329 | 1960 | Dick Morgan | Dick Morgan at the Showboat | |
| RLP 330 | 1960 | Nat Adderley | That's Right! | |
| RLP 331 | 1960 | Johnny Griffin | The Big Soul-Band | |
| RLP 332 | 1960 | Don Wilkerson | The Texas Twister | |
| RLP 333 | 1960 | Jimmy Heath | Really Big! | |
| RLP 334 | 1960 | Bobby Timmons | Soul Time | |
| RLP 335 | 1960 | Mangione Brothers Sextet | Jazz Brothers | |
| RLP 336 | 1960 | Blue Mitchell | Blue's Moods | |
| RLP 337 | 1960 | Yusef Lateef | The Centaur and the Phoenix | |
| RLP 338 | 1961 | Johnny Griffin | Johnny Griffin’s Studio Jazz Party | |
| RLP 339 | 1960 | Billy Taylor | Warming Up! | |
| RLP 340 | 1960 | Clifford Jordan | Spellbound | |
| RLP 341 | 1961 | George Russell | Stratusphunk | |
| RLP 342 | 1961 | Wes Montgomery | Movin' Along | |
| RLP 343 | 1960 | Budd Johnson | Budd Johnson and the Four Brass Giants | |
| RLP 344 | 1960 | Cannonball Adderley | The Cannonball Adderley Quintet at the Lighthouse | |
| RLP 345 | 1961 | Bev Kelly | In Person | |
| RLP 346 | 1961 | Lennie McBrown | Eastern Lights | |
| RLP 347 | 1961 | Dick Morgan | See What I Mean? | |
| RLP 348 | 1961 | Elmer Snowden | Harlem Banjo! | |
| RLP 349 | 1961 | James Clay | A Double Dose of Soul | |
| RLP 350 | 1961 | Roosevelt Wardell | The Revelation | |
| RLP 351 | 1961 | Bill Evans | Explorations | |
| RLP 352 | 1961 | Teri Thornton | Devil May Care | |
| RLP 353 | 1961 | Buck Clayton | Goin' to Kansas City | |
| RLP 354 | 1961 | Barry Harris | Preminado | |
| RLP 355 | 1961 | Cannonball Adderley | Cannonball Adderley and the Poll Winners | |
| RLP 356 | 1961 | Various artists | New Orleans: The Living Legends | |
| RLP 357 | 1961 | Various artists | New Orleans: The Living Legends | |
| RLP 358 | 1961 | Sam Jones | The Chant | |
| RLP 359 | 1961 | Paul Serrano | Blues Holiday | |
| RLP 360 | 1961 | Dave Pike | It's Time for Dave Pike | |
| RLP 361 | 1961 | The Jazz Five | The Hooter | |
| RLP 362 | 1961 | Montgomery Brothers | Groove Yard | |
| RLP 363 | 1961 | Bobby Timmons | Easy Does It | |
| RLP 364 | 1961 | Sweet Emma Barrett | New Orleans: The Living Legends | |
| RLP 365 | 1961 | Kid Thomas | New Orleans: The Living Legends | |
| RLP 366 | 1961 | Victor Feldman | Merry Olde Soul | |
| RLP 367 | 1961 | Blue Mitchell | Smooth as the Wind | |
| RLP 368 | 1961 | Johnny Griffin | Change of Pace | |
| RLP 369 | 1961 | Jim Robinson | New Orleans: The Living Legends | |
| RLP 370 | 1961 | Bill Pierce & Dede Pierce | New Orleans: The Living Legends | |
| RLP 371 | 1961 | Jazz Brothers | Hey Baby! | |
| RLP 372 | 1961 | Jimmy Heath | The Quota | |
| RLP 373 | 1961 | Eddie "Lockjaw" Davis | Afro-Jaws | |
| RLP 374 | 1961 | Ida Cox | Blues for Rampart Street | |
| RLP 375 | 1961 | George Russell | Ezz-thetics | |
| RLP 376 | 1961 | Bill Evans | Sunday at the Village Vanguard | |
| RLP 377 | 1961 | Cannonball Adderley | African Waltz | |
| RLP 378 | 1961 | Percy Humphrey | New Orleans: The Living Legends | |
| RLP 379 | 1961 | Peter Bocage | New Orleans: The Living Legends | |
| RLP 380 | 1961 | Walter Norris | The Trio | |
| RLP 381 | 1961 | Elmo Hope | Homecoming! | |
| RLP 382 | 1961 | Wes Montgomery | So Much Guitar | |
| RLP 383 | 1961 | Dick Morgan | Settlin' In | |
| RLP 384 | 1961 | Don Friedman | A Day in the City | |
| RLP 385 | 1961 | Louis Cottrell | New Orleans: The Living Legends | |
| RLP 386 | 1961 | Kid Thomas | New Orleans: The Living Legends | |
| RLP 387 | 1961 | Johnny Griffin | White Gardenia | |
| RLP 388 | 1961 | Cannonball Adderley | The Cannonball Adderley Quintet Plus | |
| RLP 389 | 1961 | Various artists | Chicago: The Living Legends | |
| RLP 390 | 1961 | Various artists | Chicago: The Living Legends | |
| RLP 391 | 1961 | Bobby Timmons | In Person | |
| RLP 392 | 1961 | Barry Harris | Listen to Barry Harris | |
| RLP 393 | 1962 | Jim Robinson | New Orleans: The Living Legends | |
| RLP 394 | 1962 | Bill Pierce & Dede Pierce | New Orleans: The Living Legends | |
| RLP 395 | 1962 | Mark Murphy | Rah! | |
| RLP 396 | 1961 | JFK Quintet | Jazz Frontiers from Washington | |
| RLP 397 | 1962 | Riverside Jazz Stars | A Jazz Version of Kean | |
| RLP 398 | 1961 | Earl Hines | A Monday Date | |
| RLP 399 | 1962 | Bill Evans | Waltz for Debby | |
| RLP 400 | 1962 | Jimmy Heath | Triple Threat | |

=== 400 series ===
| Catalog number | Year | Artist | Title | Notes |
|---|---|---|---|---|
| RLP 401 | 1962 | Lil Hardin Armstrong | Chicago: The Living Legends | |
| RLP 402 | 1962 | Meade Lux Lewis | The Blues Piano Artistry of | |
| RLP 403 | 1962 | Little Brother Montgomery | Chicago: The Living Legends | |
| RLP 404 | 1962 | Cannonball Adderley | The Cannonball Adderley Sextet in New York | |
| RLP 405 | 1962 | Jazz Brothers | Spring Fever | |
| RLP 406 | 1962 | Franz Jackson | Chicago: The Living Legends | |
| RLP 407 | 1962 | Milt Jackson & Wes Montgomery | Bags Meets Wes | |
| RLP 408 | 1962 | Elmo Hope | Hope-Full | |
| RLP 409 | 1962 | Elvin Jones | Elvin! | |
| RLP 410 | 1962 | Little Brother Montgomery | Chicago: The Living Legends | |
| RLP 411 | 1962 | Eddie Jefferson | Letter from Home | |
| RLP 412 | 1962 | George Russell | The Stratus Seekers | |
| RLP 413 | 1962 | Barry Harris | Newer Than New | |
| RLP 414 | 1962 | Blue Mitchell | A Sure Thing | |
| RLP 415 | 1962 | Junie Cobb | New Hometown Band | |
| RLP 416 | 1962 | Cannonball Adderley | Greatest Hits | |
| RLP 417 | 1962 | Odetta | Odetta and the Blues | |
| RLP 418 | 1962 | Alberta Hunter | Chicago: The Living Legends | |
| RLP 419 | 1962 | Tadd Dameron | The Magic Touch | |
| RLP 420 | 1962 | Johnny Griffin | The Kerry Dancers | |
| RLP 421 | 1962 | Thelonious Monk | Greatest Hits | |
| RLP 422 | 1962 | Bobby Timmons | Sweet and Soulful Sounds | |
| RLP 423 | 1962 | Mongo Santamaria | Go Mongo | |
| RLP 424 | 1962 | JFK Quintet | Young Ideas | |
| RLP 425 | 1962 | Billie Poole | Sermonette | |
| RLP 426 | 1962 | Albert Wynn | Chicago: The Living Legends | |
| RLP 427 | 1962 | Charlie Byrd | Latin Impressions | |
| RLP 428 | 1962 | Bill Evans | Moon Beams | |
| RLP 429 | 1962 | Milt Jackson | Big Bags | |
| RLP 430 | 1962 | Sweets Edison & Eddie "Lockjaw" Davis | Jawbreakers | |
| RLP 431 | 1962 | Don Friedman | Circle Waltz | |
| RLP 432 | 1962 | Sam Jones | Down Home | |
| RLP 433 | 1962 | Cannonball Adderley | Know What I Mean? | |
| RLP 434 | 1962 | Wes Montgomery | Full House | |
| RLP 435 | 1962 | Barry Harris | Chasin' the Bird | |
| RLP 436 | 1962 | Charlie Byrd | Bossa Nova Pelos Passaros | |
| RLP 437 | 1962 | Johnny Griffin | Grab This! | |
| RLP 438 | 1962 | Art Blakey | Caravan | |
| RLP 439 | 1962 | Blue Mitchell | The Cup Bearers | |
| RLP 440 | 1962 | George Russell | The Outer View | |
| RLP 441 | 1963 | Mark Murphy | That's How I Love the Blues! | |
| RLP 442 | 1963 | Johnny "Hammond" Smith | Black Coffee | |
| RLP 443 | 1963 | Thelonious Monk | Thelonious Monk in Italy | |
| RLP 444 | 1963 | Cannonball Adderley | Jazz Workshop Revisited | |
| RLP 445 | 1963 | Bill Evans | Interplay | |
| RLP 446 | 1963 | Milt Jackson | Invitation | |
| RLP 447 | 1963 | Junior Mance | Junior's Blues | |
| RLP 448 | 1963 | Charlie Byrd | Byrd's Word! | |
| RLP 449 | 1963 | Charlie Byrd | Byrd in the Wind | |
| RLP 450 | 1963 | Charlie Byrd | Mr. Guitar | |
| RLP 451 | 1963 | Charlie Byrd | The Guitar Artistry of Charlie Byrd | |
| RLP 452 | 1963 | Charlie Byrd | Charlie Byrd at the Village Vanguard | |
| RLP 453 | 1963 | Charlie Byrd | Blues Sonata | |
| RLP 454 | 1963 | Charlie Byrd | Once More! Charlie Byrd's Bossa Nova | |
| RLP 455 | 1963 | Cannonball Adderley | Cannonball's Bossa Nova | |
| RLP 456 | 1963 | Johnny Lytle | Got That Feeling! | |
| RLP 457 | 1963 | Sal Nistico | Comin' On Up | |
| RLP 458 | 1963 | Billie Poole | Confessin' the Blues | |
| RLP 459 | 1963 | Wes Montgomery | Boss Guitar | |
| RLP 460 | 1963 | Thelonious Monk | Two Hours with Thelonious 1 | |
| RLP 461 | 1963 | Thelonious Monk | Two Hours with Thelonious 2 | |
| RLP 462 | 1963 | Johnny Griffin | Do Nothing 'til You Hear from Me | |
| RLP 463 | 1963 | Don Friedman | Flashback | |
| RLP 464 | 1963 | Art Blakey | Ugetsu | |
| RLP 465 | 1963 | Jimmy Heath | Swamp Seed | |
| RLP 466 | 1963 | Johnny "Hammond" Smith | Mr. Wonderful | |
| RLP 467 | 1963 | Charlie Byrd | Byrd at the Gate | |
| RLP 468 | 1963 | Bobby Timmons | Born to Be Blue! | |
| RLP 469 | 1963 | Willie Rodriguez | Flatjacks | |
| RLP 470 | 1963 | Johnny Lytle | Happy Ground | reissue of Jazzland JLP 44 |
| RLP 471 | 1964 | Rod Levitt | The Dynamic Sound Patterns | |
| RLP 472 | 1963 | Wes Montgomery | Fusion! Wes Montgomery with Strings | |
| RLP 473 | 1964 | Bill Evans | How My Heart Sings | |
| RLP 474 | 1963 | Nat Adderley | Little Big Horn | |
| RLP 475 | 1964 | Duke Ellington & Billy Strayhorn | Great Times! | |
| RLP 476 | 1963 | Ben Webster & Joe Zawinul | Soulmates | |
| RLP 477 | 1963 | Cannonball Adderley | Nippon Soul | |
| RLP 478 | 1966 | Milt Jackson | For Someone I Love | |
| RLP 479 | 1967 | Johnny Griffin | Wade in the Water | rerelease of RLP 331 |
| RLP 480 | 1966 | Johnny Lytle | The Village Caller! | |
| RLP 481 | 1966 | Charlie Byrd | Byrd Song | |
| RLP 482 | 1966 | Johnny "Hammond" Smith | Open House! | |
| RLP 483 | 1966 | Thelonious Monk | Thelonious Monk Story 1 | |
| RLP 484 | 1966 | Thelonious Monk | Thelonious Monk Story 2 | |
| RLP 485 | 1966 | Don Friedman | Dreams and Explorations | |
| RLP 486 | 1966 | Jimmy Heath | On the Trail | |
| RLP 487 | 1966 | Bill Evans | At Shelly's Manne-Hole | |
| RLP 488 | N/A | Unissued | Unissued | Unissued |
| RLP 489 | N/A | Unissued | Unissued | Unissued |
| RLP 490 | 1966 | Thelonious Monk | Thelonious Monk with John Coltrane | |
| RLP 491 | 1966 | Thelonious Monk | Monk in France | |
| RLP 492 | 1966 | Wes Montgomery | Portrait of Wes | |
| RLP 493 | 1967 | Art Blakey | Kyoto | |
| RLP 494 | 1967 | Wes Montgomery | Guitar on the Go | |
| RLP 495 | 1967 | Milt Jackson | Milt Jackson Quintet Live at the Village Gate | |
| RLP 496 | 1967 | Johnny "Hammond" Smith | A Little Taste | |
| RLP 497 | N/A | Unissued | Unissued | Unissued |
| RLP 498 | 1967 | Charlie Byrd | Solo Flight | |
| RLP 499 | 1967 | Cannonball Adderley | Cannonball in Europe! | |
| RLP 12-500 | N/A | Unissued | Unissued | Unissued |

== Jazzland discography ==
| Catalog number | Artist | Title | Notes |
|---|---|---|---|
| JLP 1 | Gigi Gryce & Donald Byrd | Gigi Gryce and the Jazz Lab Quintet | reissue of RLP 12-229 |
| JLP 2 | Zoot Sims | Zoot! | AKA Zoot Sims Quintet |
| JLP 3 | Kenny Dorham | The Swingers | |
| JLP 4 | Randy Weston & Art Blakey | Zulu (Trio and Solo) | |
| JLP 5 | Herbie Mann & Jack Sheldon | Californians | |
| JLP 6 | Kenny Drew | Hard Bop (This Is New) | |
| JLP 7 | Clark Terry and Eddie Henry | Cruisin' | |
| JLP 8 | Mundell Lowe | Low Down Guitar (A Grand Night for Swinging) | |
| JLP 9 | Kenny Drew | Tough Piano Trio | |
| JLP 10 | Clark Terry and Kenny Dorham | Top Trumpets | |
| JLP 11 | Various artists | East Coast Sounds | |
| JLP 12 | Wilbur Ware | Chicago Cookers | reissue of RLP 12-252 |
| JLP 13 | Randy Weston | Greenwich Village Jazz | reissue of RLP 12-232 |
| JLP 14 | Kenny Dorham | Kenny Dorham & Friends | |
| JLP 15 | Don Elliott | Double Trumpet Doings | |
| JLP 16 | Mel Rhyne | Organizing | |
| JLP 17 | Woody Herman | The Fourth Herd | |
| JLP 18 | Chet Baker | Chet Baker in Milan | |
| JLP 19 | Charlie Rouse | Takin' Care of Business | |
| JLP 20 | Harold Land | West Coast Blues! | |
| JLP 21 | Chet Baker | Chet Baker with Fifty Italian Strings | |
| JLP 22 | Johnny Lytle | Blue Vibes | |
| JLP 23 | Joe Alexander | Blue Jubilee | |
| JLP 24 | Joyce Collins | Girl Here Plays a Mean Piano | |
| JLP 25 | Julian Priester | Spiritsville | |
| JLP 26 | Bernt Rosengren & Lars Werner | Bombastica | |
| JLP 27 | René Thomas | Guitar Groove | |
| JLP 28 | Walter Benton | Out of This World | |
| JLP 29 | Dexter Gordon | The Resurgence of Dexter Gordon | |
| JLP 30 | Junior Mance | The Soulful Piano of Junior Mance | |
| JLP 31 | Eddie Davis & Johnny Griffin | Tough Tenors | |
| JLP 32 | Sonny Red | Breezing | |
| JLP 33 | Harold Land | Eastward Ho! Harold Land in New York | |
| JLP 34 | Tubby Hayes & Ronnie Scott | The Message from Britain | |
| JLP 35 | Les Spann | Gemini | |
| JLP 36 | Paul Gonsalves | Gettin' Together! | |
| JLP 37 | Joe Harriott | Southern Horizons | |
| JLP 38 | Wild Bill Moore | Wild Bill's Beat | |
| JLP 39 | Eddie Davis & Johnny Griffin | Lookin' at Monk! | |
| JLP 40 | Clifford Jordan & Sonny Red | A Story Tale | |
| JLP 41 | Junior Mance | Junior Mance Trio at the Village Vanguard | |
| JLP 42 | Eddie Davis & Johnny Griffin | Griff & Lock | |
| JLP 43 | Bennie Green | Glidin' Along | |
| JLP 44 | Johnny Lytle | Happy Ground | |
| JLP 45 | Don Sleet | All Members | |
| JLP 46 | Thelonious Monk | Thelonious Monk with John Coltrane | |
| JLP 47 | Nat Adderley | Naturally! | |
| JLP 48 | Red Garland | Bright and Breezy | |
| JLP 49 | Joe Harriott | Free Form | |
| JLP 50 | Fats Navarro | Fats Navarro with the Tadd Dameron Quintet | |
| JLP 51 | Don Rendell | Roarin' | |
| JLP 52 | Clifford Jordan | Starting Time | |
| JLP 53 | Junior Mance | Big Chief! | |
| JLP 54 | Wild Bill Moore | Bottom Groove | |
| JLP 55 | George Shearing | George Shearing and the Montgomery Brothers | |
| JLP 56 | Frank Strozier | Long Night | |
| JLP 57 | Chris Anderson | Inverted Image | |
| JLP 58 | Junior Cook | Junior's Cookin' | |
| JLP 59 | Sonny Red | The Mode | |
| JLP 60 | Eddie Davis & Johnny Griffin | Blues Up & Down | |
| JLP 61 | Dorothy Ashby | Soft Winds | |
| JLP 62 | Red Garland | The Nearness of You | |
| JLP 63 | Junior Mance | The Soul of Hollywood | |
| JLP 64 | Oscar Pettiford | Last Recordings | |
| JLP 65 | Various artists | Great Big Band and Friends | |
| JLP 66 | Sal Nistico | Heavyweights | |
| JLP 67 | Johnny Lytle | Nice and Easy | |
| JLP 68 | Tadd Dameron | 1948 | |
| JLP 69 | Clifford Jordan | Bearcat | |
| JLP 70 | Frank Strozier | March of the Siamese Children | |
| JLP 71 | [[Sonny Stitt]] | Low Flame | |
| JLP 72 | Sonny Rollins | Sonny's Time | |
| JLP 73 | Red Garland | Solar | |
| JLP 74 | Sonny Red | Images | |
| JLP 75 | Nat Adderley | In the Bag | |
| JLP 76 | Eddie Davis & Johnny Griffin | Tough Tenor Favorites | |
| JLP 77 | Junior Mance | Happy Time | |
| JLP 78 | The Metronomes | Something Big | |
| JLP 79 | Max Roach | Conversation | |
| JLP 80 | Lee Morgan | Take Twelve | |
| JLP 81 | Johnny Lytle | Moon Child | |
| JLP 82 | Kenny Dorham | And Friends | |
| JLP 83 | Wynton Kelly | Whisper Not | |
| JLP 84 | Chuck Mangione | Recuerdo | |
| JLP 85 | Benny Golson | Reunion (The Modern Touch) | |
| JLP 86 | Sonny Rollins | Shadow Waltz (Freedom Suite) | |
| JLP 87 | Red Garland | Red's Good Groove | |
| JLP 88 | Chet Baker | Polka Dots and Moonbeams (In New York) | |
| JLP 92 | Philly Joe Jones | Drums Around the World | reissue of RLP-302 |
| JLP 93 | Johnny Griffin | The Little Giant | |
| JLP 96 | Clark Terry Quartet with Thelonious Monk | In Orbit | |
| JLP 97 | Eddie Davis | Alma Alegre | |
| JLP 1001 | Various artists | The Stars of Jazz 1961 | |
