= Norman Simmons (musician) =

American musician (1929–2021)

Norman Simmons (October 6, 1929 – May 13, 2021) was an American musician, arranger, composer, educator, and most prominently a pianist who worked extensively with Helen Humes, Carmen McRae, Sarah Vaughan, Anita O'Day, and Joe Williams among others.

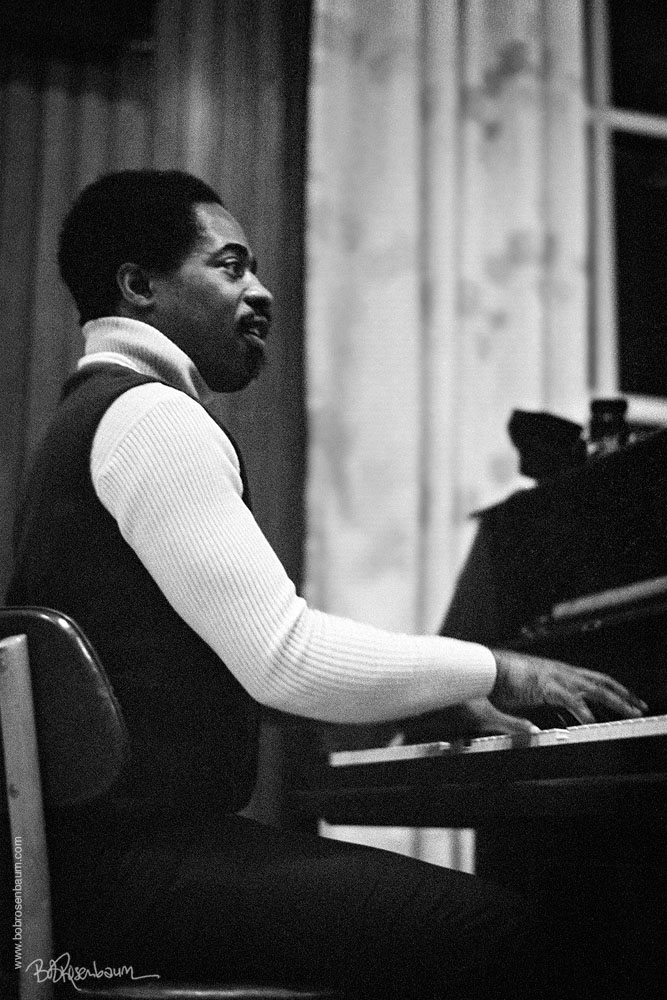
Pianist Norman Simmons in Binghamton NY, 1973.

== Biography ==
Simmons was born in Chicago, Illinois on October 6, 1929. During the early 1950s, he was house pianist at the Beehive Lounge on East 55th Street, playing with visiting musicians such as Wardell Gray, Lester Young and with Charlie Parker on his final Chicago performance in February 1955.

In 1966, his arrangement for Ramsey Lewis' hit of "Wade in the Water" became a large commercial success. He was a member of the Ellington Legacy Band from 2002.

== Discography ==
=== As leader ===
- Norman Simmons Trio (Argo, 1956)
- Ramira The Dancer (Spotlite, 1976)
- Midnight Creeper (Milljac, 1979)
- I'm...The Blues (Milljac, 1981)
- 13th Moon (Milljac, 1986)
- The Heat And The Sweet (Milljac, 1997)
- The Art Of Norman Simmons (Savant, 2000) - with Eric Alexander
- Manha De Carnaval (Sound Hills [Japan], 2002)
- Synthesis (Savant, 2002) - with Eric Alexander
- In Private (Savant, 2004)

=== As sideman ===
With Roy Eldridge

- What It's All About (Pablo, 1976)

With Johnny Griffin

- Battle Stations (Prestige, 1960) - with Eddie "Lockjaw" Davis
- Johnny Griffin’s Studio Jazz Party (Riverside, 1960)

With Red Holloway

- Red Soul (Prestige, 1965)

With Etta Jones

- My Buddy: Etta Jones Sings the Songs of Buddy Johnson (HighNote, 1998)
- All the Way (HighNote, 1999)

With Carmen McRae

- Sings Lover Man and Other Billie Holiday Classics (Philips, 1962)
- Live at Sugar Hill San Francisco (Time, 1963)
- Bittersweet (Focus, 1964)
- Second to None (Mainstream, 1964)
- Haven't We Met? (Mainstream, 1965)
- Woman Talk, Live at the Village Gate (Mainstream, 1965)
- Portrait of Carmen (Atlantic, 1968)
- The Sound of Silence (Atlantic, 1968)
- Live & Wailing (Mainstream, 1965, reissued with Woman Talk on Columbia, 1973)
- Carmen McRae (Mainstream, 1971)
- Live at Century Plaza, Los Angeles (Atlantic, 1975)

With Betty Carter

- Betty Carter (Bet-Car Productions, 1970)
- Round Midnight (Roulette, 1975)
- Finally, Betty Carter (Roulette, 1975)

With Harold Ousley

- The People's Groove (Muse, 1977)
- Sweet Double Hipness (Muse, 1980)

With Anita O'Day

- Anita O'Day with John Poole Trio Featuring Norman Simmons - Live at Mingo's (Emily, 1979)

With Scott Hamilton and Warren Vaché

- Skyscrapers (Concord Jazz, 1980)

With Clifford Jordan, Von Freeman, Cy Touff, Victor Sproles, and Wilbur Campbell

- Hyde Park After Dark (Bee Hive, 1983)

With Dakota Staton

- Ms. Soul (Groove Merchant, 1974)

With Joe Williams

- Joe Williams & Friends June 1985 - I Just Want to Sing (Delos, 1985)
- Every Night: Live At Vine St. (Verve, 1987)
- In Good Company (Verve, 1989)
- That Holiday Feelin' (Verve, 1990)
- Ballad And Blues Master (Verve, 1992)

With Al Grey and Bjarne Nerem

- Al Meets Bjarne (Gemini, 1987)

=== As arranger ===
With Johnny Griffin

- The Little Giant (Riverside, 1959)
- The Big Soul-Band (Riverside, 1960)
- White Gardenia (Riverside, 1961)

With Teri Thornton

- Devil May Care (Riverside, 1961)

With Mark Murphy

- Memories of You: Remembering Joe Williams (HighNote, 2003)
