= Johnny Griffin (album) =

Studio album by Johnny Griffin Quartet
- Released: 1958
- Recorded: 1956; Chicago
- Genre: Jazz
- Length: 26:12
- Label: Argo; LP 624
- Producer: Dave Usher

Johnny Griffin chronology
Johnny Griffin Sextet (1958)	Johnny Griffin (1958)	Way Out! (1958)

Johnny Griffin (also referred to as J. G., Tenor and Johnny Griffin Quartet) is an album by American jazz saxophonist Johnny Griffin featuring tracks recorded in 1956 and released on the Argo label in 1958. The album features the first recordings made under Griffin's leadership but was not released until 1958 by which time his first Blue Note album Introducing Johnny Griffin (1956) had been released and he had attracted attention as a member of Art Blakey's Jazz Messengers.

== Reception ==
Professional ratings
Review scores
Source	Rating
AllMusic	4/5 stars
The Penguin Guide to Jazz Recordings	3/4 stars

Thom Jurek, writing for AllMusic, described it as "a necessary addition to any shelf that pays Johnny Griffin homage".

== Track listing ==
All compositions by Johnny Griffin, except as indicated

1. "I Cried for You" (Gus Arnheim, Arthur Freed, Abe Lyman) – 3:37
2. "Satin Wrap" – 3:05
3. "Yesterdays" (Otto Harbach, Jerome Kern) – 2:31
4. "Riff-Raff" (Wilbur Ware) – 3:10
5. "Bee-Ees" – 3:52
6. "The Boy Next Door" (Harbach, Vincent Youmans) – 3:18
7. "These Foolish Things" (Harry Link, Jack Strachey, Eric Maschwitz) – 3:36
8. "Lollypop" – 3:03

== Personnel ==
- Johnny Griffin – tenor saxophone
- Junior Mance – piano
- Wilbur Ware – bass
- Buddy Smith – drums
