= The Congregation (Johnny Griffin album) =

Studio album by Johnny Griffin
- Released: March 1958
- Recorded: October 23, 1957
- Studio: Van Gelder Studio; Hackensack, NJ
- Genre: Jazz
- Length: 29:51 (LP); 37:20 (CD)
- Label: Blue Note; BLP 1580
- Producer: Alfred Lion

Johnny Griffin chronology
A Blowin' Session (1957)	The Congregation (1958)	Johnny Griffin Sextet (1958)

The Congregation is an album by American tenor saxophonist Johnny Griffin recorded on October 23, 1957 and released on Blue Note the following year, his final recording for the label.

== Background ==
=== Artwork ===
The cover art was designed by Reid Miles and illustrated by Andy Warhol.

== Reception ==
Professional ratings
Review scores
Source	Rating
AllMusic	5/5 stars
The Penguin Guide to Jazz Recordings	3/4 stars

The AllMusic review by Scott Yanow states, "The great tenor saxophonist Johnny Griffin is heard in top form on this near-classic quartet set... It's recommended for bop collectors."

== Track listing ==
All tracks are written by Johnny Griffin, except as noted.

Side 1
No.	Title	Writer(s)	Length
1.	"The Congregation"		6:47
2.	"Latin Quarter"	John Jenkins	6:29

Side 2
No.	Title	Writer(s)	Length
1.	"I'm Glad There Is You"	Jimmy Dorsey; Paul Mertz	5:10
2.	"Main Spring"		6:33
3.	"It's You or No One"	Sammy Cahn; Jule Styne	4:52

1994 CD reissue bonus track
No.	Title	Writer(s)	Length
5.	"I Remember You"	Johnny Mercer; Victor Schertzinger	7:29

== Personnel ==
=== Musicians ===
- Johnny Griffin – tenor saxophone
- Sonny Clark – piano
- Paul Chambers – bass
- Kenny Dennis – drums

=== Technical personnel ===
==== Original ====
- Alfred Lion – producer
- Rudy Van Gelder – recording engineer
- Reid Miles – design
- Andy Warhol – cover illustration
- Francis Wolff – photography
- Robert Levin – liner notes

==== Reissue ====
- Michael Cuscuna – reissue producer
- Larry Walsh – mastering
- Patrick Roques – redesign
