= It Could Happen to You =

It Could Happen to You may refer to:

- "It Could Happen to You" (song), a 1944 popular standard by Johnny Burke and Jimmy Van Heusen
- (Chet Baker Sings) It Could Happen to You, a 1958 album by Chet Baker containing a version of the above song
- It Could Happen to You (1937 film), a drama directed by Phil Rosen
- It Could Happen to You (1939 film), a mystery directed by Alfred L. Werker
- It Could Happen to You (1994 film), a romantic comedy-drama starring Nicolas Cage and Bridget Fonda

== See also ==
- It Should Happen to You, a 1954 film starring Judy Holliday and Jack Lemmon
