= Ev'rything I've Got =

Song
- Published: 1942
- Composer: Richard Rodgers
- Lyricist: Lorenz Hart

"Ev'rything I've Got" (sometimes referred to as "Ev'rything I've Got Belongs to You") is a show tune from the Rodgers and Hart musical By Jupiter (1942), in which it was introduced by Ray Bolger and Benay Venuta.

== Notable recordings ==
- Ella Fitzgerald - Ella Fitzgerald Sings the Rodgers & Hart Songbook (1956)
- Blossom Dearie - Blossom Dearie (1957)
- Johnny Pace - Chet Baker Introduces Johnny Pace (1958)
- Rosemary Clooney - Show Tunes (1989)
- Kristin Korb - Why Can't You Behave (2006)
- Sara Gazarek - Blossom & Bee (2012)
- Cécile McLorin Salvant - The Window (2018)
