= Red's Good Groove =

Studio album by Red Garland
- Released: 1962
- Recorded: March 22, 1962
- Studios: Plaza Sound Studio, New York City
- Genres: Jazz, hard bop
- Label: Jazzland JLP 87
- Producer: Orrin Keepnews

Red Garland chronology
Solar (1962)	Red's Good Groove (1962)	When There Are Grey Skies (1962)

Red's Good Groove is an album by American jazz pianist Red Garland with a quintet which was recorded in 1962 and released on the Jazzland label.

== Reception ==
Professional ratings
Review scores
Source	Rating
DownBeat	3/5 stars
AllMusic	3/5 stars
The Penguin Guide to Jazz Recordings	2.5/4 stars

The AllMusic reviewer Ken Dryden stated: "Although this is a one time studio blowing session, things obviously gelled quickly for everyone as they got underway on this 1962 recording... [a] very enjoyable session". The song "Take Me in Your Arms" had not been recorded by many jazz artists at the time of Red Garland's recording, though it had been recorded by several easy-listening artists including Percy Faith, Pete King, and Ferrante & Teicher. The song is an adaptation of "Liebe war es nie" by Alfréd Márkus (also known as "Fred Markush"), a Hungarian composer of operettas and film scores.

== Track listing ==
1. "Red's Good Groove" (Red Garland) – 8:22
2. "Love Is Here to Stay" (George Gershwin, Ira Gershwin) – 4:44
3. "This Time the Dream's on Me" (Harold Arlen, Johnny Mercer) – 5:54
4. "Take Me in Your Arms" (Fred Markush, Mitchell Parish) – 5:35
5. "Excerent!" (Pepper Adams) – 6:05
6. "Falling in Love with Love" (Lorenz Hart, Richard Rodgers) – 6:06

== Personnel ==
- Red Garland – piano
- Blue Mitchell – trumpet
- Pepper Adams – baritone saxophone
- Sam Jones – bass
- Philly Joe Jones – drums
