= This Here Is Bobby Timmons =

Studio album by Bobby Timmons
- Released: 1960
- Recorded: January 13 & 14, 1960
- Genre: Jazz, hard bop
- Length: 37:33
- Label: Riverside RLP 1164
- Producer: Orrin Keepnews

Bobby Timmons chronology
| Jenkins, Jordan and Timmons (1957) | This Here Is Bobby Timmons (1960) | Soul Time (1960) |

This Here Is Bobby Timmons is an album by American jazz pianist Bobby Timmons recorded in 1960 and released on the Riverside label. It was his first album as sole leader; the earlier Jenkins, Jordan and Timmons (1957) was a co-led date with saxophonists John Jenkins and Clifford Jordan.

== Reception ==
The AllMusic review awarded the album 4 stars.

Professional ratings
Review scores
| Source | Rating |
|---|---|
| AllMusic | 4/5 stars |
| The Penguin Guide to Jazz | 3/4 stars |
| The Rolling Stone Jazz Record Guide | 4/5 stars |

== Track listing ==
All compositions by Bobby Timmons except as indicated

1. "This Here" – 3:34
2. "Moanin'" – 5:08
3. "Lush Life" (Billy Strayhorn) – 2:31
4. "The Party's Over" (Jule Styne) – 4:14
5. "Prelude to a Kiss" (Duke Ellington, Irving Mills) – 3:23
6. "Dat Dere" – 5:26
7. "My Funny Valentine" (Lorenz Hart, Richard Rodgers) – 5:08
8. "Come Rain or Come Shine" (Harold Arlen, Johnny Mercer) – 4:33
9. "Joy Ride" – 3:58

- Recorded at Reeves Sound Studios in New York City on January 13 & 14, 1960.

== Personnel ==
- Bobby Timmons – piano
- Sam Jones – bass (except track 3)
- Jimmy Cobb – drums (except track 3)
