= Jenkins, Jordan and Timmons =

Studio album by John Jenkins, Clifford Jordan and Bobby Timmons
- Released: 1957
- Recorded: July 26, 1957
- Studio: Van Gelder Studio, Hackensack, New Jersey
- Genre: Jazz
- Length: 37:26
- Label: New Jazz; PRLP 8232
- Producer: Bob Weinstock

John Jenkins chronology
Alto Madness (1957)	Jenkins, Jordan and Timmons (1957)	John Jenkins with Kenny Burrell (1957)

Clifford Jordan chronology
Cliff Jordan (1957)	Jenkins, Jordan and Timmons (1957)	Cliff Craft (1957)

Bobby Timmons chronology
Jenkins, Jordan and Timmons (1957)	This Here Is Bobby Timmons (1960)

Jenkins, Jordan and Timmons is an album by saxophonists John Jenkins and Clifford Jordan and pianist Bobby Timmons recorded in 1957 and released on the New Jazz label.

== Reception ==
Professional ratings
Review scores
Source	Rating
Allmusic	4/5 stars

Scott Yanow of Allmusic reviewed the album calling it "an excellent effort".

== Track listing ==
All compositions by John Jenkins except as indicated

1. "Cliff's Edge" (Clifford Jordan) - 6:29
2. "Tenderly" (Walter Gross, Jack Lawrence) - 7:03
3. "Princess" - 6:15
4. "Soft Talk" (Julian Priester) - 10:32
5. "Blue Jay" - 7:07

== Personnel ==
- John Jenkins - alto saxophone
- Clifford Jordan - tenor saxophone
- Bobby Timmons - piano
- Wilbur Ware - bass
- Dannie Richmond - drums

=== Production ===
- Bob Weinstock - supervisor
- Rudy Van Gelder - engineer
