= Live at Century Plaza =

Live album by Carmen McRae
- Released: 1975
- Recorded: December 26–27, 1968
- Venue: Hong Kong Bar, Century Plaza Hotel, Los Angeles
- Genre: Vocal jazz
- Label: Atlantic

Carmen McRae chronology
November Girl (1975)	Live at Century Plaza (1975)	Can't Hide Love (1976)

Live at Century Plaza is a live album by American singer Carmen McRae, recorded in late December 1968 at the Los Angeles Century Plaza Hotel's Hong Kong Bar with the participation of a trio consisting of pianist Norman Simmons, drummer Frank Severino and bassist Chuck Domanico.

Atlantic Records established and contractually licensed the rights to the show, but for inexplicable reasons waited years before doing anything with the material, until label executive director Nesuhi Ertegun finally released an abridged version in 1975 in Japan. The album exists in two versions: the 1975 version, which is available only on vinyl and includes 15 tracks, and the expanded 1991 release, which added nine bonus tracks.

== Critical reception ==
Professional ratings
Review scores
Source	Rating
AllMusic	4/5 stars

Nathan Southern of AllMusic attributed the delayed release to the lack of stylistic cohesion present to Seth MacRae; over the course of one evening, first backed by a swinging jazz trio and then on solo piano, she moves nonstop from blues standards to bossa nova, upbeat tempo pop, late '60s melodies and more. In his opinion, the stylistic diversity seems harsh at first, but those who are ready to adapt to MacRae's interest in combining several genres will feel great satisfaction from the material presented here. He also recommended listening to the extended version of the album, because it not only includes wonderful melodies, but also leaves a recitative of MacRae, which demonstrates her unique personality and delightful sense of humor, as well as her ability to instantly win over the audience.

== Track listing ==
1. "Elusive Butterfly"
2. "Midnight Sun"
3. "For Once in My Life"
4. "Yesterday"
5. "Spread to All"
6. "The Right to Love"
7. "If You Never Fall in Love with Me"
8. "I'm Always Drunk in San Francisco"
9. "Why Shouldn't I"
10. "I Thought About You"
11. "The Sound of Silence"
12. "Away, Away, Away"
13. "Did I Ever Love"
14. "On a Clear Day (You Can See Forever)"

1991 reissue bonus tracks

9. "Introduction"
16. "Sweet Pumpkin"
17. "Introduction"
18. "No More Blues"
19. "Miss Otis Regrets"
20. "Satin Doll"
21. "Never Let Me Go"
22. "My Ship"
23. "Never Will I Marry"
24. "September in the Rain"

Note: The track "Introduction" does not appear in the original version, however, in the 1991 reissue it comes separately immediately after "I'm Always Drunk in San Francisco" and is not listed as a bonus track.

== Personnel ==
- Carmen McRae – vocals
- Chuck Domanico – bass
- Frank Severino – drums
- Norman Simmons – piano
