= Johnny Griffin, Vol. 2 =

- A Blowin' Session

Studio album by Johnny Griffin
- Released: September or October 1957
- Recorded: April 8, 1957
- Studio: Van Gelder Studio; Hackensack, New Jersey
- Genre: Jazz
- Length: 38:19
- Label: Blue Note; BLP 1559
- Producer: Alfred Lion

Johnny Griffin chronology
Introducing Johnny Griffin (1956)	Johnny Griffin, Vol. 2 (1957)	The Congregation (1957)

Professional ratings
Review scores
Source	Rating
AllMusic	5/5 stars
The Rolling Stone Jazz Record Guide	4/5 stars
The Penguin Guide to Jazz Recordings	3/4 stars

Johnny Griffin, Vol. 2, also known as A Blowing Session, is an album by the jazz saxophonist Johnny Griffin. It was recorded in April 1957 and released in September or October the same year through Blue Note Records.

== Track listing ==
=== Side 1 ===
1. "The Way You Look Tonight" (Kern, Fields) – 9:41
2. "Ball Bearing" (Griffin) – 8:11

=== Side 2 ===
1. "All the Things You Are" (Kern, Hammerstein) – 10:14
2. "Smoke Stack" (Griffin) – 10:13

=== 1999 CD reissue bonus track ===
5. "Smoke Stack" (alternate take) – 11:00

== Personnel ==
=== Musicians ===
- Lee Morgan – trumpet
- Johnny Griffin, Hank Mobley, John Coltrane – tenor saxophone
- Wynton Kelly – piano
- Paul Chambers – bass
- Art Blakey – drums

=== Technical personnel ===
- Alfred Lion – producer
- Rudy Van Gelder – recording engineer
- Reid Miles – design
- Francis Wolff, Harold Feinstein – photography
- Ira Gitler – liner notes
