= When There Are Grey Skies =

Studio album by Red Garland
- Released: March 1963
- Recorded: October 9, 1962
- Studio: Van Gelder Studio, Englewood Cliffs, NJ
- Genre: Jazz
- Length: 39:31
- Label: Prestige; PRLP 7258
- Producer: Ozzie Cadena

Red Garland chronology
Red's Good Groove (1962)	When There Are Grey Skies (1963)	The Quota (1971)

When There Are Grey Skies is an album by the jazz pianist Red Garland, recorded in 1962 and released the following year on the Prestige label.

== Reception ==
Professional ratings
Review scores
Source	Rating
DownBeat	4.5/5 stars
Allmusic	4/5 stars
The Penguin Guide to Jazz Recordings	3/4 stars

Jazz critic Harvey Pekar, writing for DownBeat magazine, had this to say about Garland: "Garland is one of the most important figures in recent jazz piano history. His method of block-chording has influenced many other pianists. Also important is the way he establishes a groove with his left hand..." Scott Yanow noted the album's "unlikely material."

== Track listing ==
1. "Sonny Boy" (Brown, DeSylva, Henderson, Jolson) - 5:16
2. "My Honey's Lovin' Arms" (Meyer, Ruby) - 3:40
3. "St. James Infirmary" (Primrose) - 6:41
4. "I Ain't Got Nobody" (Graham, Peyton, Williams) - 3:55
5. "Baby Won't You Please Come Home" (Warfield, Williams) - 4:08
6. "Nobody Knows the Trouble I See" (Traditional) - 12:00
7. "My Blue Heaven" (Donaldson, Whiting) - 3:51 Bonus track on CD reissue

== Personnel ==
- Red Garland - piano
- Wendell Marshall - double bass
- Charlie Persip - drums
