= White Gardenia =

Studio album by Johnny Griffin
- Released: 1961
- Recorded: July 13, 14 & 17, 1961 at Plaza Sound Studios, New York City
- Genre: Jazz
- Length: 38:54
- Label: Riverside RLP 387 (mono), RS 9387
- Producer: Orrin Keepnews

Johnny Griffin chronology
Blues Up & Down (1961)	White Gardenia (1961)	The Kerry Dancers (1962)

White Gardenia is an album by jazz saxophonist Johnny Griffin with brass and strings which was recorded in 1961 and released on the Riverside label. Intended as a tribute album to jazz singer Billie Holiday, who had died two years earlier, she had sung all of the songs, except for the title track, which is the only original composition by Griffin on the album. The white gardenia was the flower Holiday often wore in her hair. The orchestral arrangements were written by Melba Liston and Norman Simmons.

== Reception ==
Professional ratings
Review scores
Source	Rating
DownBeat	3/5 stars
Penguin Guide to Jazz	3/4 stars
AllMusic	2.5/5 stars

Richard Cook and Brian Morton wrote in their Penguin Guide to Jazz on CD: "A delightful, smoothly orchestrated tribute to Lady Day that manages to be more than just pastiche" with the strings serving "mainly for depth of focus and harmony, rather than as emotional treacle." The AllMusic site review by Scott Yanow stated the arrangements were "tasteful, and the lyrical music is well-performed, if not overly memorable. Worth checking out".

== Release notes ==
A review of White Gardenia in DownBeat from March 1962 indicates that the album was in fact released not until about that time. Riverside also released the title track as a single with "Good Morning, Heartache" as B-side (R 4514), and a 7-inch EP with four tracks, adding "Detour Ahead" and "No More" (SE-2056). In 1973, the album was reissued on a double LP coupled with another recording by Griffin with Orchestra from May and June 1960, originally released as The Big Soul-Band (Big Soul on Milestone). White Gardenia was later reissued on CD as part of the Original Jazz Classics series on OJCCD 1877-2.

== Track listing ==
1. "Gloomy Sunday" (Sam M. Lewis, Rezső Seress) – 4:06
2. "That Old Devil Called Love" (Doris Fisher, Allan Roberts) – 3:50
3. "White Gardenia" (Johnny Griffin) – 3:18
4. "God Bless the Child" (Billie Holiday, Arthur Herzog, Jr.) – 3:17
5. "Detour Ahead" (Lou Carter, Herb Ellis, Johnny Frigo) – 4:33
6. "Good Morning Heartache" (Ervin Drake, Dan Fisher, Irene Higginbotham) – 4:10
7. "Don't Explain" (Holiday, Herzog) – 4:43
8. "Trav'lin' Light" (Trummy Young, Jimmy Mundy, Johnny Mercer) – 4:06
9. "No More" (Tutti Camarata, Bob Russell) – 3:57
10. "Left Alone" (Holiday, Mal Waldron) – 2:54

Tracks 1, 7 and 9 were recorded on July 13, tracks 2, 5 and 8 were recorded July 14, and tracks 3, 4, 6 and 10 were recorded on July 17, 1961.

== Personnel ==
- Johnny Griffin — tenor saxophone
- Nat Adderley – cornet (except tracks 1, 7 and 9)
- Ernie Royal – trumpet (exc. 1, 7, 9)
- Clark Terry – flugelhorn (1, 7, 9), trumpet (exc. 1, 7, 9)
- Ray Alonge – French horn
- Jimmy Cleveland, Paul Faulise, Urbie Green – trombone
- Jimmy Jones – piano (exc. 2, 5, 8)
- Barry Harris – piano (2, 5, 8)
- Barry Galbraith – guitar
- Ron Carter – bass
- Ben Riley – drums
- Alfred Brown, Harry Lookofsky, David Schwartz – violin
- Charles McCracken (exc. 2, 5, 8), Lucient Schmit (1, 5, 7–9), Maurice Bialkin, Ray Schweitzer and Edgardo Sodero (2, 5, 8), Abe Kessler and Peter Makas (3, 4, 6, 10) – cello
- Melba Liston (exc. 4–6, 8), Norman Simmons (4–6, 8) – arranger
