= Jazz Eyes =

Studio album by John Jenkins with Donald Byrd
- Released: 1957
- Recorded: September 10, 1957
- Studio: Van Gelder Studio, Hackensack, New Jersey
- Genre: Jazz
- Length: 37:36
- Label: Regent; MG 6056
- Producer: Ozzie Cadena

John Jenkins chronology
John Jenkins with Kenny Burrell (1957)	Jazz Eyes (1957)

Donald Byrd chronology
Modern Jazz Perspective (1957)	Jazz Eyes (1957)	Byrd in Paris (1958)

Jazz Eyes is an album by saxophonist John Jenkins and trumpeter Donald Byrd recorded in 1957 and released on Regent Records (a subsidiary of Savoy Records). Savoy issued it again later with the alternate title Star Eyes.

== Reception ==
Professional ratings
Review scores
Source	Rating
Allmusic	4/5 stars

Brandon Burke of Allmusic reviewed the album observing: "In keeping with much of Regent and Savoy's output at the time, all four tunes are based upon very relaxed, mid-tempo bop heads. As compositions, they aren't entirely memorable, but that shouldn't take anything away from the sublime groove maintained throughout the LP. Recommended".

== Track listing ==
All compositions by John Jenkins except where noted

1. "Star Eyes" (Gene de Paul, Don Raye) - 10:00
2. "Orpheus" - 8:20
3. "Honeylike" - 9:15
4. "Rockaway" - 10:00

== Personnel ==
- John Jenkins - alto saxophone
- Donald Byrd - trumpet
- Curtis Fuller - trombone
- Tommy Flanagan - piano
- Doug Watkins - bass
- Art Taylor - drums

=== Production ===
- Ozzie Cadena - producer
- Rudy Van Gelder - engineer
