= Johnny Griffin Sextet =

Studio album by Johnny Griffin
- Released: Late May/early June 1958
- Recorded: February 25, 1958; New York City
- Genre: Jazz
- Length: 41:29
- Label: Riverside; RLP 12-264
- Producer: Orrin Keepnews

Johnny Griffin chronology
The Congregation (1958)	Johnny Griffin Sextet (1958)	JG (1958)

Professional ratings
Review scores
Source	Rating
AllMusic	4/5 stars
The Penguin Guide to Jazz Recordings	4/4 stars

Johnny Griffin Sextet is an album by jazz saxophonist Johnny Griffin and his all-star sextet, released on the Riverside label in 1958. It was Griffin's first album as leader on Riverside, and was recorded the day before the Way Out! session dates.

== Track listing ==
1. "Stix' Trix" (Wilbur Campbell) - 7:43
2. "What's New?" (Bob Haggart, Johnny Burke) - 7:53
3. "Woody 'n' You" (Dizzy Gillespie) - 6:12
4. "Johnny G.G." (John Hines) - 9:45
5. "Catharsis" (Johnny Griffin) - 9:56

== Personnel ==
- Johnny Griffin — tenor saxophone
- Pepper Adams - baritone saxophone (not on "Woody 'n' You")
- Donald Byrd - trumpet (not on "Woody 'n' You")
- Kenny Drew — piano
- Wilbur Ware — bass
- Philly Joe Jones — drums
