= John Jenkins (jazz musician) =

American jazz musician

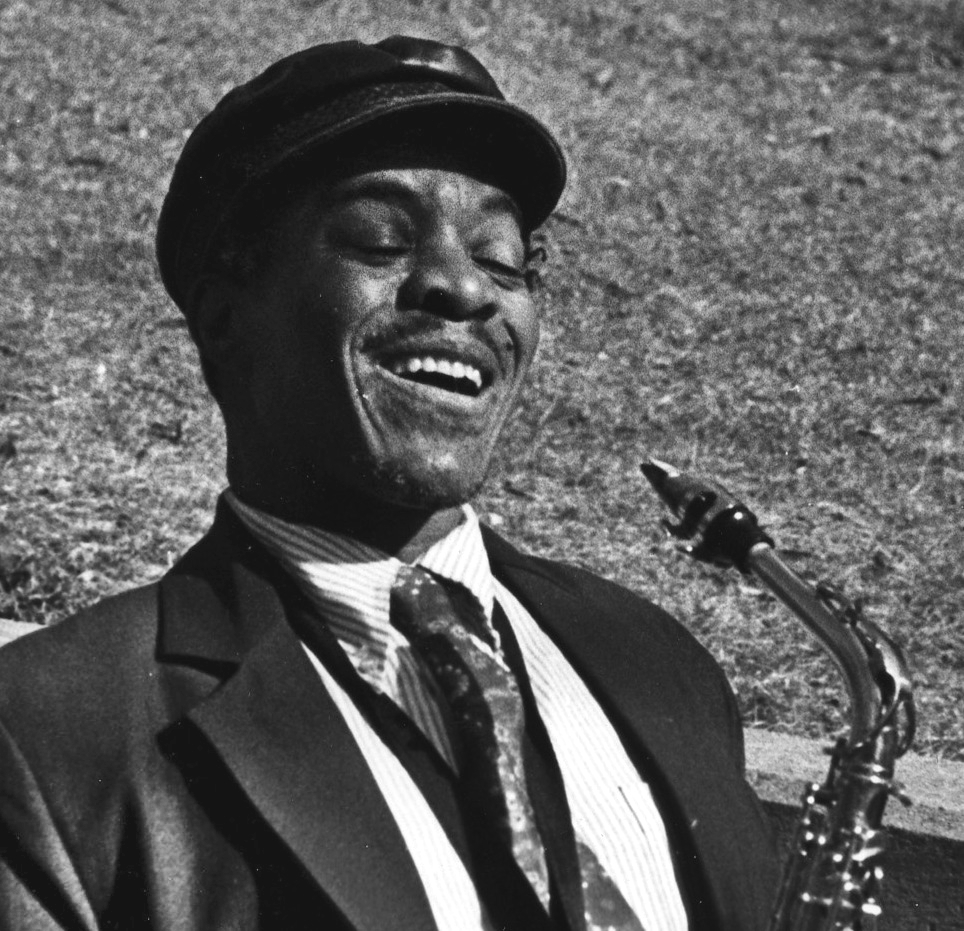
- Jenkins in 1992

Background information
- Born: John Jenkins; January 3, 1931; Chicago, Illinois
- Died: July 12, 1993 (aged 62)
- Genres: Jazz, bebop, hard bop, straight-ahead jazz
- Occupation: Musician
- Instrument: Alto saxophone
- Years active: 1949–1962, 1984-1993
- Labels: Blue Note, Prestige, Savoy, Riverside

John Jenkins (January 3, 1931 – July 12, 1993) was an American jazz saxophonist.

== Career ==
Born in Chicago, Jenkins initially studied clarinet in high school but switched to saxophone after six months on the instrument. He played in jam sessions led by Joe Segal at Roosevelt College from 1949 to 1956. He played with Art Farmer in 1955 and led his own group in Chicago later that year. In 1957, he played with Charles Mingus and recorded two albums as a leader. He played as a sideman with Johnny Griffin, Donald Byrd, Hank Mobley, Paul Quinichette, Clifford Jordan, Sahib Shihab, and Wilbur Ware in the late 1950s and early 1960s, but essentially dropped out of music after 1962, aside from a few dates with Gloria Coleman.

After leaving the jazz world he worked as a messenger in New York and dabbled in jewelry; he sold brass objects at street fairs in the 1970s. After 1983, he began practicing again and playing live on street corners; shortly before he died he played with Clifford Jordan.

== Discography ==
=== As leader ===
- Alto Madness (Prestige, 1957) - with Jackie McLean
- Jenkins, Jordan and Timmons (New Jazz, 1957) - with Clifford Jordan and Bobby Timmons
- John Jenkins with Kenny Burrell (Blue Note, 1957)
- Jazz Eyes (Regent, 1957) (Reissued as Donald Byrd - Star Eyes (Savoy 1976)

=== As sideman ===
With Teddy Charles

- Coolin' (New Jazz, 1957)

With Clifford Jordan

- Cliff Jordan (Blue Note, 1957)
- Play What You Feel (Mapleshade, 1990 [1997])

With Hank Mobley

- Hank (Blue Note, 1957)

With Paul Quinichette

- On the Sunny Side (Prestige, 1957)

With Sahib Shihab

- The Jazz We Heard Last Summer (Savoy, 1957)

With Wilbur Ware

- The Chicago Sound (Riverside, 1957) (a.k.a. The Chicago Cookers (Jazzland LP 12))
