= John Jenkins with Kenny Burrell =

Studio album by John Jenkins with Kenny Burrell
- Released: 1957
- Recorded: August 11, 1957
- Studio: Van Gelder Studio; Hackensack, NJ
- Genre: Jazz
- Length: 50:51
- Label: Blue Note; BLP 1537
- Producer: Alfred Lion

John Jenkins chronology
Jenkins, Jordan and Timmons (1957)	John Jenkins with Kenny Burrell (1957)	Jazz Eyes (1957)

Kenny Burrell chronology
2 Guitars (1957)	John Jenkins and Kenny Burrell (1957)	All Day Long (1957)

John Jenkins with Kenny Burrell is an album by American jazz saxophonist John Jenkins, featuring jazz guitarist Kenny Burrell, recorded on August 11, 1957 and released on Blue Note later that year. The two are backed by rhythm section Sonny Clark, Paul Chambers and Dannie Richmond.

== Reception ==
The AllMusic review by Scott Yanow states, "Sounding at times like Charlie Parker (with touches of Phil Woods and Jackie McLean), Jenkins easily keeps up with his better-known sidemen and plays the boppish music with plenty of creativity, emotion, and excitement. After listening to the high-quality set, one wonders why Jenkins did not make it."

Professional ratings
Review scores
Source	Rating
AllMusic	3/5 stars

== Track listing ==
All tracks are written by John Jenkins, except as noted.

Side 1
No.	Title	Writer(s)	Length
1.	"From This Moment On"	Cole Porter	7:37
2.	"Motif"		6:14
3.	"Everything I Have Is Yours"	Harold Adamson; Burton Lane	6:10

Side 2
No.	Title	Writer(s)	Length
1.	"Sharon"		7:47
2.	"Chalumeau"		5:56
3.	"Blues for Two"	Kenny Burrell	4:42

1996 CD reissue bonus tracks
No.	Title	Length
7.	"Sharon" (alternate take)	6:27
8.	"Chalumeau" (alternate take)	5:58

== Personnel ==
=== Musicians ===
- John Jenkins – alto saxophone
- Kenny Burrell – guitar
- Sonny Clark – piano
- Paul Chambers – bass
- Dannie Richmond – drums

=== Technical personnel ===
- Alfred Lion – producer
- Rudy Van Gelder – recording engineer, mastering
- Tom Hannan – design
- Francis Wolff – photography
- Ira Gitler – liner notes
