= Cliff Jordan (album) =

Studio album by Cliff Jordan
- Released: 1957
- Recorded: June 2, 1957
- Studio: Van Gelder Studio; Hackensack, New Jersey
- Genre: Jazz
- Length: 40:33
- Label: Blue Note; BN 1565
- Producer: Alfred Lion

Clifford Jordan chronology
Blowing in from Chicago (1957)	Cliff Jordan (1957)	Jenkins, Jordan and Timmons (1957)

Cliff Jordan is an album by American jazz saxophonist Clifford Jordan recorded on June 2, 1957 and released on Blue Note later that year. The septet features horn section Lee Morgan, Curtis Fuller and John Jenkins, and rhythm section Ray Bryant, Paul Chambers and Art Taylor.

== Reception ==
The AllMusic review by awarded the album 3 stars.

Professional ratings
Review scores
Source	Rating
AllMusic	3/5 stars
The Rolling Stone Jazz Record Guide	4/5 stars

== Track listing ==
All compositions by Cliff Jordan, except as noted.

=== Side 1 ===
1. "Not Guilty" – 11:43
2. "St. John" (John Jenkins) – 8:18

=== Side 2 ===
1. "Blue Shoes" (Curtis Fuller) – 9:38
2. "Beyond the Blue Horizon" (W. Franke Harling, Leo Robin, Richard A. Whiting) – 6:59
3. "Ju-Ba" (Lee Morgan) – 3:55

== Personnel ==
=== Musicians ===
- Lee Morgan – trumpet
- Curtis Fuller – trombone
- John Jenkins – alto saxophone
- Cliff Jordan – tenor saxophone
- Ray Bryant – piano
- Paul Chambers – bass
- Art Taylor – drums

=== Technical personnel ===
- Alfred Lion – producer
- Rudy Van Gelder – recording engineer, mastering
- Tom Hannan – design
- Francis Wolff – photography
- Robert Levin – liner notes
