= Battle Stations (album) =

Studio album by Eddie "Lockjaw" Davis and Johnny Griffin
- Released: 1960
- Recorded: September 2, 1960
- Studio: Van Gelder Studio, Englewood Cliffs
- Genre: Jazz
- Label: Prestige; PRLP 7282
- Producer: Esmond Edwards

Eddie "Lockjaw" Davis chronology
Afro-Jaws (1960)	Battle Stations (1960)	Trane Whistle (1960)

Johnny Griffin chronology
The Big Soul-Band (1960)	Battle Stations (1960)	Johnny Griffin’s Studio Jazz Party (1960)

Battle Stations is an album by saxophonists Eddie "Lockjaw" Davis and Johnny Griffin recorded in 1960 and released on Prestige Records.

Professional ratings
Review scores
Source	Rating
DownBeat	3.5/5 stars
AllMusic	3/5 stars

== Reception ==
AllMusic reviewer Alex Henderson stated: "Battle Stations is an album that fans of heated two-tenor exchanges shouldn't overlook."

== Track listing ==
1. "What's Happening" (Fletcher Henderson) – 6:51
2. "Abundance" (Norman Simmons) – 6:54
3. "If I Had You" (Jimmy Campbell and Reg Connelly, Ted Shapiro) – 6:45
4. "63rd Street Theme" (Johnny Griffin) – 7:12
5. "Pull My Coat" (Richard Evans) – 6:40
6. "Hey Jim!" (Babs Gonzales, James Moody) – 8:00

== Personnel ==
- Eddie "Lockjaw" Davis, Johnny Griffin – tenor saxophone
- Norman Simmons – piano
- Victor Sproles – bass
- Ben Riley – drums
