= Soul Groove =

Studio album by Johnny Griffin and Matthew Gee
- Released: 1964
- Recorded: May 14 & 16, 1963; New York City
- Genre: Jazz
- Label: Atlantic; LP-1431

Matthew Gee chronology
Jazz by Gee (1956)	Soul Groove (1964)

Johnny Griffin chronology
Grab This! (1962)	Soul Groove (1963)	Do Nothing 'til You Hear from Me (1963)

Soul Groove is an album by saxophonist Johnny Griffin and trombonist Matthew Gee recorded in 1963 and released on the Atlantic label.

== Reception ==
Professional ratings
Review scores
Source	Rating
AllMusic	3/5 stars

AllMusic awarded the album 3 stars stating "The music seldom reaches ignition point on this undistinguished 1965 session... Soul Groove disappoints in several areas, including the writing that seldom surpasses head-arrangement status... The co-leaders' contributions also pass in a blur. Tenor and trombone front lines can work, but here the tone of the two instruments is too similar; Griffin and Gee's solos tend to drift and smear over one another".

== Track listing ==
All compositions by Matthew Gee except as indicated

1. "Oh Gee" - 2:21
2. "Here" - 5:10
3. "At Sundown" (Lou Donaldson) - 4:51
4. "The Swingers Get the Blues, Too" - 8:00
5. "Twist City" - 5:22
6. "Poor Butterfly" (John Golden, Raymond Hubbell) - 4:59
7. "Mood for Cryin'" (Aaron Bell) - 4:42
8. "Renee" - 5:18

== Personnel ==
- Johnny Griffin - tenor saxophone
- Matthew Gee - trombone
- "Big" John Patton - organ (tracks 1, 5 & 8)
- Hank Jones - piano, organ (tracks 2–4, 6 & 7)
- Aaron Bell - bass, tuba
- Art Taylor - drums
- Carlos "Patato" Valdes - congas, bongos
