= Night Lady =

Studio album by Johnny Griffin Quartet
- Released: 1964
- Recorded: February 13, 1964; Koln, West Germany
- Genre: Jazz
- Length: 42:10
- Label: Philips; 840 447 PY

Johnny Griffin chronology
Do Nothing 'til You Hear from Me (1963)	Night Lady (1964)	The Man I Love (1963)

Professional ratings
Review scores
Source	Rating
Allmusic	3/5 stars

Night Lady is an album by saxophonist Johnny Griffin recorded in West Germany in 1963. Originally released on the Philips label, Night Lady was later released on EmArcy Records.

== Reception ==
Allmusic awarded the album three stars.

== Track listing ==
All compositions by Francy Boland except as indicated

1. "Scrabble" (Johnny Griffin) - 7:18
2. "Summertime" (George Gershwin, Ira Gershwin, DuBose Heyward) - 5:53
3. "Old Stuff" - 8:05
4. "Night Lady" - 9:23
5. "Little Man You've Had A Busy Day" (Al Hoffman, Maurice Sigler, Mabel Wayne) - 5:20
6. "All the Things You Are" (Oscar Hammerstein II, Jerome Kern) - 6:11

== Personnel ==
- Johnny Griffin - tenor saxophone
- Francy Boland - piano
- Jimmy Woode - bass
- Kenny Clarke - drums
