= The Chicago Sound =

Studio album by Wilbur Ware Quintet featuring Johnny Griffin
- Released: 1957
- Recorded: October 16 and November 18, 1957; Reeves Sound Studios, New York City
- Genre: Jazz
- Length: 38:25
- Label: Riverside; RLP 12-252
- Producer: Orrin Keepnews

The Chicago Sound is the sole album led by American jazz bassist Wilbur Ware. It features a quintet with the saxophonist Johnny Griffin and was recorded in 1957 for the Riverside label. It was subsequently re-released by the Jazzland label as: Johnny Griffin & Wilbur Ware with Junior Mance and renamed "The Chicago Cookers" in 1960.

== Reception ==
Professional ratings
Review scores
Source	Rating
Allmusic	4.5/5 stars
The Penguin Guide to Jazz Recordings	3.5/4 stars

Allmusic reviewer Scott Yanow considered the album "a fine debut by Ware. It seems strange that in his remaining 20-plus years the bassist never led another album".

== Track listing ==
All compositions by Wilbur Ware, except as indicated.

1. "Mamma-Daddy" - 3:53
2. "Body and Soul" (Frank Eyton, Johnny Green, Edward Heyman, Robert Sour) - 3:15
3. "Desert Sands" (Paul Dunlap, Edward Heyman, Stuff Smith) - 5:28
4. "31st and State" - 6:27
5. "Lullaby of the Leaves" (Bernice Petkere, Joe Young) - 2:56
6. "Latin Quarters" (John Jenkins) - 4:37
7. "Be-Ware" (Jenkins) - 4:28
8. "The Man I Love" (George Gershwin, Ira Gershwin) - 7:21
- Recorded at Reeves Sound Studios in New York City on October 16 (tracks 1 & 3–7) and November 18 (tracks 2 & 8), 1957

== Personnel ==
- Wilbur Ware - bass
- Johnny Griffin - tenor saxophone
- John Jenkins - alto saxophone
- Junior Mance - piano
- Wilbur Campbell (tracks 1 & 3–7), Frankie Dunlop (tracks 2 & 8) - drums
