= Chet Baker with Fifty Italian Strings =

Studio album by Chet Baker
- Released: 1960
- Recorded: September 28 & 29 and October 5, 1959; Milan, Italy
- Genre: Jazz
- Length: 34:44
- Label: Jazzland; JLP 21

Chet Baker chronology
Chet Baker in Milan (1959)	Chet Baker with Fifty Italian Strings (1960)	Chet Is Back! (1962)

Chet Baker with Fifty Italian Strings is an album by trumpeter Chet Baker which was recorded in Italy in 1959 and released on the Jazzland label.

== Reception ==
Professional ratings
Review scores
Source	Rating
Allmusic	1.5/5 stars
The Penguin Guide to Jazz Recordings	3/4 stars

Allmusic awarded the album with 1½ stars stating "Fans will want this set but, due to the mundane string arrangements and the lack of variety, more general collectors should acquire his earlier jazz-oriented dates first". The Penguin Guide to Jazz Recordings is more positive, describing the album as “a good one of its kind”, and awarding 3 stars.

== Track listing ==
1. "I Should Care" (Sammy Cahn, Axel Stordahl, Paul Weston) – 2:46
2. "The Song Is You" (Oscar Hammerstein II, Jerome Kern) – 3:16
3. "Goodbye" (Gordon Jenkins) – 2:30
4. "Angel Eyes" (Earl Brent, Matt Dennis) – 3:34
5. "Forgetful" (George Handy, Jack Segal) – 4:59
6. "Violets for Your Furs" (Dennis, Tom Adair) – 3:30
7. "When I Fall in Love" (Edward Heyman, Victor Young) – 3:32
8. "Autumn in New York" (Vernon Duke) – 2:26
9. "Street of Dreams" (Sam M. Lewis, Victor Young) – 2:41
10. "Deep in a Dream" (Eddie DeLange, Jimmy Van Heusen) – 4:30
- Recorded in Milan, Italy on September 28 (tracks 2, 4, 7 & 10), September 29 (tracks 1, 3 & 8) and October 5 (tracks 5, 6 & 9), 1959.

== Personnel ==
- Chet Baker – trumpet, vocals
- Mario Pezzotta – trombone
- Glauco Masetti – alto saxophone
- Gianni Basso – tenor saxophone
- Fausto Papetti – baritone saxophone
- Giulio Libano – piano, celeste
- Franco Cerri – bass
- Gene Victory – drums
- Len Mercer – arranger, conductor
- Unidentified string section
