= Tough Tenor Favorites =

Studio album by The Johnny Griffin and Eddie "Lockjaw" Davis Quintet
- Released: 1962
- Recorded: February 5, 1962; New York City
- Genre: Jazz
- Label: Jazzland; JLP-76

Johnny Griffin chronology
The Kerry Dancers (1961–62)	Tough Tenor Favorites (1962)	Grab This! (1962)

Eddie "Lockjaw" Davis chronology
Blues Up & Down (1961)	Tough Tenor Favorites (1962)	Jawbreakers (1962)

Professional ratings
Review scores
Source	Rating
Allmusic	4/5 stars
The Penguin Guide to Jazz Recordings	2.5/4 stars

Tough Tenor Favorites is an album by saxophonists Eddie "Lockjaw" Davis and Johnny Griffin recorded in 1962 and released on the Jazzland label.

== Reception ==
The AllMusic site awarded the album 4 stars stating "Johnny Griffin and Eddie "Lockjaw" Davis, the two "tough tenors" in question, always made for an exciting team... The main winner in these fiery tenor "battles" is the listener".

== Track listing ==
1. "Bahia" (Ary Barroso)
2. "Blue Lou" (Irving Mills, Edgar Sampson)
3. "How Am I to Know?" (Jack King)
4. "Ow!" (Dizzy Gillespie)
5. "I Wished on the Moon" (Dorothy Parker, Ralph Rainger)
6. "Tin Tin Deo" (Gil Fuller, Dizzy Gillespie, Chano Pozo)
7. "From This Moment On" (Cole Porter)

== Personnel ==
- Eddie "Lockjaw" Davis, Johnny Griffin - tenor saxophone
- Horace Parlan - piano
- Buddy Catlett - bass
- Ben Riley - drums
