= Man Bites Harmonica! =

Studio album by Jean Thielemans
- Released: 1958
- Recorded: December 30, 1957 and January 7, 1958; Reeves Sound Studios, New York City
- Genre: Jazz
- Length: 38:25
- Label: Riverside; RLP 12-257
- Producer: Orrin Keepnews

Toots Thielemans chronology
The Sound (1955)	Man Bites Harmonica! (1958)	The Whistler and His Guitar (1964)

Man Bites Harmonica! is an album by harmonica player Jean "Toots" Thielemans, his second as a bandleader. It was recorded in late 1957 and early 1958 for the Riverside label. The album showcases the harmonica, previously little-used in jazz, and demonstrates it could be an improvising jazz instrument on par with trumpet, saxophones or piano. Thielemans plays harmonica on all songs, except for a version of "Imagination" on which he plays guitar.

== Reception ==
Professional ratings
Review scores
Source	Rating
Allmusic	4.5/5 stars

Allmusic awarded the album 4½ stars. In his review, Scott Yanow states "Even four decades later, no jazz harmonica player has dethroned the great Toots".

== Track listing ==
All compositions by Toots Thielemans except as indicated

1. "East of the Sun" (Brooks Bowman) - 7:14
2. "Don't Blame Me" (Dorothy Fields, Jimmy McHugh) - 2:27
3. "18th Century Ballroom" (Ray Bryant) - 3:46
4. "Soul Station" - 6:58
5. "Fundamental Frequency" - 4:54
6. "Struttin' With Some Barbecue" (Lil Hardin Armstrong, Don Raye) - 4:30
7. "Imagination" (Johnny Burke, Jimmy Van Heusen) - 4:27
8. "Isn't It Romantic?" (Lorenz Hart, Richard Rodgers) - 5:16
- Recorded at Reeves Sound Studios in New York City on December 30, 1957 (tracks 1, 3-6 & 8) and January 7, 1958 (tracks 2 & 7)

== Personnel ==
- Jean "Toots" Thielemans - harmonica, guitar
- Pepper Adams - baritone saxophone (1, 3–6, 8)
- Kenny Drew - piano
- Wilbur Ware - bass
- Art Taylor - drums
