= Johnny Griffin's Studio Jazz Party =

Studio album by Johnny Griffin
- Released: 1960
- Recorded: September 7, 1960; New York City
- Genre: Jazz
- Length: 45:34
- Label: Riverside; RLP 338
- Producer: Orrin Keepnews

Johnny Griffin chronology
Battle Stations (1960)	Johnny Griffin's Studio Jazz Party (1960)	Tough Tenors (1960)

Johnny Griffin's Studio Jazz Party is an album by jazz saxophonist Johnny Griffin which was recorded in 1960 and released on the Riverside label.

== Reception ==
Professional ratings
Review scores
Source	Rating
AllMusic	4/5 stars

The AllMusic review by Scott Yanow stated the album was "performed before an invited and enthusiastic studio audience, who provided atmosphere. Babs Gonzales introduces several of the numbers, but proves to be an unnecessary presence. However, Griffin in particular plays quite well in this loose straight-ahead setting"

== Track listing ==
1. "Party Time" (spoken introduction by Babs Gonzales) - 1:14
2. "Good Bait" (Count Basie, Tadd Dameron) - 12:24
3. "There Will Never Be Another You" (Mack Gordon, Harry Warren) - 8:20
4. "Toe-Tappin'" (David Burns) - 7:53
5. "You've Changed" (Bill Carey, Carl T. Fischer) - 7:37
6. "Low Gravy" (Gonzales) - 8:06

== Personnel ==
- Johnny Griffin — tenor saxophone
- Dave Burns - trumpet
- Norman Simmons - piano
- Victor Sproles - bass
- Ben Riley - drums
- Babs Gonzales - announcer
