= Chet Baker Plays the Best of Lerner and Loewe =

Studio album by Chet Baker
- Released: 1959
- Recorded: July 21 & 22, 1959; Reeves Sound Studios, New York City
- Genre: Jazz
- Length: 43:02
- Label: Riverside; RLP 12-307
- Producer: Orrin Keepnews

Chet Baker chronology
Chet (1959)	Chet Baker Plays the Best of Lerner and Loewe (1959)	Chet Baker in Milan (1959)

Chet Baker Plays the Best of Lerner and Loewe is an album by trumpeter Chet Baker featuring show tunes by Lerner and Loewe which was recorded in 1959 and released on the Riverside label.

== Reception ==
Professional ratings
Review scores
Source	Rating
Allmusic	3/5 stars
Pitchfork	5.5/10
The Rolling Stone Jazz Record Guide	3/5 stars
The Penguin Guide to Jazz Recordings	3/4 stars
Tom Hull	B+

Allmusic awarded the album with 3 stars stating "these readings are comparatively understated. That said, the timelessness of the melodies, coupled with the assembled backing aggregate, make Chet Baker Plays the Best of Lerner and Loewe (1959) a memorable concept album".

== Track listing ==
All compositions by Alan Jay Lerner and Frederick Loewe

1. "I've Grown Accustomed to Her Face" - 4:16
2. "I Could Have Danced All Night" - 3:43
3. "The Heather on the Hill" - 5:04
4. "On the Street Where You Live" - 8:37
5. "Almost Like Being in Love" - 4:53
6. "Thank Heaven for Little Girls" - 4:35
7. "I Talk to the Trees" - 5:51
8. "Show Me" - 6:30
- Recorded at Reeves Sound Studios in New York City on July 21 (tracks 2 & 6–8) and July 22 (tracks 1 & 3–5), 1959.

== Personnel ==
- Chet Baker - trumpet
- Herbie Mann - flute, tenor saxophone
- Zoot Sims - tenor saxophone, alto saxophone
- Pepper Adams - baritone saxophone
- Bob Corwin (tracks 1 & 3–5), Bill Evans (tracks 2 & 6–8) - piano
- Earl May - bass
- Clifford Jarvis - drums
