= Solar (Red Garland album) =

Studio album by Red Garland Quartet
- Released: September 1962
- Recorded: January 30, 1962; Plaza Sound Studios, New York City
- Genre: Jazz
- Length: 38:11
- Label: Jazzland; JLP 73
- Producer: Orrin Keepnews

Red Garland Quartet chronology
The Nearness of You (1961)	Solar (1962)	Red's Good Groove (1962)

Professional ratings
Review scores
Source	Rating
Allmusic	3/5 stars
The Penguin Guide to Jazz Recordings	2.5/4 stars

Solar is an album by jazz musician Red Garland, recorded in 1962 and released the same year on Jazzland as JLP 73.

== Track listing ==
1. "Sophisticated Swing" (Hudson, Parish) - 5:31
2. "Solar" (Miles Davis/Chuck Wayne) - 5:03
3. "Where Are You?" (Adamson, McHugh) - 5:17
4. "Marie's Delight" (Garland) - 3:33
5. "This Can't Be Love" (Rodgers, Hart) - 4:08
6. "The Very Thought of You" (Ray Noble) - 5:29
7. "Blues For 'News" (Garland) - 3:24
8. "I Just Can't See for Lookin'" (Nadine Robinson, Dok Stanford) - 5:46

== Personnel ==
- Red Garland - piano
- Les Spann - guitar, flute (#3, 6)
- Sam Jones - bass
- Frank Gant - drums
