= Introducing Johnny Griffin =

Studio album by Johnny Griffin
- Released: February 1957
- Recorded: April 17, 1956
- Studio: Van Gelder Studio; Hackensack, NJ
- Genre: Jazz
- Length: 37:03 (LP); 47:43 (CD)
- Label: Blue Note; BLP 1533
- Producer: Alfred Lion

Johnny Griffin chronology
Introducing Johnny Griffin (1957)	A Blowin' Session (1957)

Professional ratings
Review scores
Source	Rating
AllMusic	4.5/5 stars
The Penguin Guide to Jazz Recordings	3/4 stars

Introducing Johnny Griffin is the debut album by the jazz tenor saxophonist Johnny Griffin. It was released through Blue Note Records in February 1957. The recording was made at the Van Gelder Studio in Hackensack on April 17, 1956.

== Track listing ==
=== Original release ===
Side 1
No.	Title	Writer(s)	Length
1.	"Mil Dew"	Griffin	3:56
2.	"Chicago Calling"	Griffin	5:38
3.	"These Foolish Things"	Harry Link; Holt Marvell; Jack Strachey	5:12
4.	"The Boy Next Door"	Hugh Martin; Ralph Blane	4:57

Side 2
No.	Title	Writer(s)	Length
1.	"Nice and Easy"	Griffin	4:22
2.	"It's All Right with Me"	Cole Porter	5:02
3.	"Lover Man"	Davis; Ram Ramirez; Sherman	7:56

=== CD reissue ===
No.	Title	Writer(s)	Length
1.	"Mil Dew"	Griffin	3:56
2.	"Chicago Calling"	Griffin	5:38
3.	"These Foolish Things"	Harry Link; Holt Marvell; Jack Strachey	5:12
4.	"The Boy Next Door"	Hugh Martin; Ralph Blane	4:57
5.	"Nice and Easy"	Griffin	4:22
6.	"It's All Right with Me"	Cole Porter	5:02
7.	"Lover Man"	Davis; Ram Ramirez; Sherman	7:56
8.	"The Way You Look Tonight"	Dorothy Fields; Jerome Kern	6:23
9.	"Cherokee"	Ray Noble	4:17
Total length:			47:43

== Personnel ==
- Johnny Griffin – tenor saxophone
- Wynton Kelly – piano
- Curly Russell – bass
- Max Roach – drums
