= Chet Baker in Milan =

Studio album by Chet Baker
- Released: 1959
- Recorded: September 25 & 26 and October 6, 1959
- Studio: Gurtler Studio, Milan, Italy
- Genre: Jazz
- Length: 42:41
- Label: Jazzland; JLP 18

Chet Baker chronology
Chet Baker Plays the Best of Lerner and Loewe (1959)	Chet Baker in Milan (1959)	Chet Baker with Fifty Italian Strings (1959)

Chet Baker in Milan is an album by trumpeter Chet Baker which was recorded in Italy in 1959 and released on the Jazzland label.

== Reception ==
Professional ratings
Review scores
Source	Rating
Allmusic	3/5 stars
The Penguin Guide to Jazz Recordings	2.5/4 stars

Allmusic awarded the album with 3 stars stating "If the adage that claims music as the universal language was never proven before, it certainly becomes obvious here. The Italian musicians are intimately familiar with the decidedly American art form of jazz, so much so that the accompanying sax solos are often rendered with more fluidity than Baker's own trumpet leads. The lack of recognizable names should not dissuade fans of West Coast cool jazz from seeking a copy of Chet Baker in Milan, as the album captures all of what is vibrant about the genre".

== Track listing ==
1. "Lady Bird" (Tadd Dameron) - 4:46
2. "Cheryl Blues" (Charlie Parker) - 5:00
3. "Tune Up" (Miles Davis) - 5:18
4. "Line for Lyons" (Gerry Mulligan) - 7:47
5. "Pent Up House" (Sonny Rollins) - 5:00
6. "Look for the Silver Lining" (Buddy DeSylva, Jerome Kern) - 4:35
7. "Indian Summer" (Al Dubin, Victor Herbert) - 5:15
8. "My Old Flame" (Sam Coslow, Arthur Johnston) - 4:56
- Recorded in Milan, Italy on September 25 (track 1), September 26 (tracks 2–4) and October 6 (tracks 5–8), 1959.

== Personnel ==
- Chet Baker - trumpet
- Glauco Masetti - alto saxophone - except 7 and 8
- Gianni Basso - tenor saxophone - except 7 and 8
- Renato Sellani - piano
- Franco Cerri - bass
- Gene Victory - drums
- Giulio Libano - arranger
