= The Kerry Dancers =

Studio album by Johnny Griffin
- Released: 1962
- Recorded: December 21, 1961; January 5 & 29, 1962
- Studio: Plaza Sound Studios, NYC
- Genre: Jazz
- Length: 38:55
- Label: Riverside; RLP 420
- Producer: Orrin Keepnews

Johnny Griffin chronology
White Gardenia (1961)	The Kerry Dancers (1962)	Tough Tenor Favorites (1962)

The Kerry Dancers (subtitled and Other Swinging Folk) is the album which was recorded by jazz saxophonist Johnny Griffin during the late 1961 and early 1962 period, and it was subsequently released by the Riverside label.

== Reception ==
Professional ratings
Review scores
Source	Rating
AllMusic	4/5 stars
The Penguin Guide to Jazz Recordings	3/4 stars

The AllMusic site reviewer Alex Henderson stated: "Many straight-ahead bop musicians would never consider recording traditional folk songs from the British Isles, but that's exactly what Johnny Griffin does... one of his best releases of the 1960s... The Kerry Dancers and Other Swinging Folk is among the many Griffin releases that the Chicagoan can be proud of".

== Track listing ==
1. "The Kerry Dancers" (Traditional) - 4:44
2. "Black Is the Color of My True Love's Hair" (Traditional) - 6:15
3. "Green Grow the Rushes" (Traditional) - 4:38
4. "The Londonderry Air" (Traditional) - 4:54
5. "25½ Daze" (Sara Cassey) - 4:42
6. "Oh, Now I See" (Johnny Griffin) - 5:11
7. "Hush-a-Bye" (Traditional) - 4:56
8. "Ballad for Monsieur" (Cassey) - 3:35
- Recorded at Plaza Sound Studios in New York City on December 21, 1961 (tracks 2, 6 & 7), January 5, 1962 (tracks 3, 5 & 8) and January 29, 1962 (tracks 1 & 4).

== Personnel ==
- Johnny Griffin — tenor saxophone
- Barry Harris - piano
- Ron Carter - bass
- Ben Riley - drums
