= Johnny Pace =

- Born: Johnny Pace; 1929
- Origin: United States
- Died: 1979 (aged 50)
- Genres: Jazz
- Occupation: Singer
- Instrument: Vocals
- Years active: 1950s and 1960s

Johnny Pace (born 1929, Paterson, New Jersey – 1979) was an American jazz and blues vocalist of the 1950s and 1960s, although he had limited recording and was overshadowed by Frank Sinatra, he rivalled Johnny Desmond, Chet Baker and Bobby Darin

== Biography ==
Pace was born in Paterson, New Jersey and served in the Army USO in Germany where he met his wife Anneliese Glaser, they traveled back to the states in 1954. Johnny and Anneliese had three children Monica, Suzanne and John. Discovered by Chet Baker in 1958, his sole album, Chet Baker Introduces Johnny Pace was recorded in December of that year for Riverside Records.

Pace was backed on the album by the Chet Baker quintet, featuring such major talents as flautist Herbie Mann and drummer Philly Joe Jones. Joe Berle is credited as the pianist but it is also noted that Bill Evans, who was briefly playing with Chet Baker at the time, played on some tracks. The recording was reissued in 1991 by the Original Jazz Classics label.

== Death ==
Pace died of cancer in 1979, and was survived by his longtime companion Naida.

== Discography ==
- Chet Baker Introduces Johnny Pace (1958) (Riverside RLP 12-292)
