= The Nearness of You (Red Garland album) =

Studio album by Red Garland
- Released: 1962
- Recorded: November 30, 1961; New York City
- Genre: Jazz
- Length: 39:38
- Label: Jazzland JLP 62

Red Garland chronology
Bright and Breezy (1961)	The Nearness of You (1962)	Solar (1962)

The Nearness of You (subtitled ballads played by Red Garland) is an album by American pianist Red Garland. Recorded in 1961, it was released on the Jazzland label in 1962.

== Reception ==
Professional ratings
Review scores
Source	Rating
Down Beat	3/5 stars
Allmusic	3/5 stars
The Penguin Guide to Jazz Recordings	3/4 stars

The Allmusic site awarded the album 3 stars stating it is "Particularly effective when used as background music".

== Track listing ==
1. "Why Was I Born?" (Oscar Hammerstein II, Jerome Kern) - 4:51
2. "The Nearness of You" (Hoagy Carmichael, Ned Washington) - 5:34
3. "Where or When" (Lorenz Hart, Richard Rodgers) - 6:09
4. "Long Ago (and Far Away)" (Ira Gershwin, Kern) - 3:54
5. "I Got It Bad (and That Ain't Good)" (Duke Ellington, Paul Francis Webster) - 5:17
6. "Don't Worry About Me" (Rube Bloom, Ted Koehler) - 4:40
7. "Lush Life" (Billy Strayhorn) - 4:15
8. "All Alone" (Irving Berlin) - 4:58

== Personnel ==
- Red Garland - piano
- Larry Ridley - bass (except 7)
- Frank Gant - drums (except 7)
