= Bright and Breezy =

Studio album by The Red Garland Trio
- Released: Mid October 1961
- Recorded: July 19, 1961
- Studio: Plaza Sound Studios, New York City
- Genre: Jazz, hard bop
- Length: 41:01
- Label: Jazzland; JLP 48
- Producer: Orrin Keepnews

The Red Garland Trio chronology
Soul Burnin' (1964)	Bright and Breezy (1961)	The Nearness of You (1961)

Professional ratings
Review scores
Source	Rating
Allmusic	3/5 stars

Bright and Breezy is an album by jazz pianist Red Garland and his trio, recorded in 1961 and released on Jazzland as JLP 48. Sam Jones had been the trio's bassist for two years (following the departure of Paul Chambers). Art Taylor, who had played drums in the Red Garland Trio since 1956, was replaced by Charlie Persip in 1960. This was the first of four sessions (July 1961–March 1962) by Garland for the Riverside subsidiary label, that were recorded at the Plaza Sound Studios by Orrin Keepnews. In October 1962 he would record a last session for his former label Prestige before taking a hiatus of nearly ten years.

== Track listing ==
1. "On Green Dolphin Street" (Bronisław Kaper, Ned Washington) – 5:09
2. "I Ain't Got Nobody" (Spencer Williams, Roger A. Graham) – 5:07
3. "You'll Never Know" (Harry Warren, Mack Gordon) – 5:27
4. "Blues in the Closet" (Oscar Pettiford) – 4:23
5. "What's New" (Bob Haggart, Johnny Burke) – 4:17
6. "Lil' Darlin'" (Neal Hefti) – 7:21
7. "What Is There to Say?" (E. Y. Harburg, Vernon Duke) – 5:11
8. "So Sorry Please" (Bud Powell) – 4:06

== Personnel ==
- Red Garland – piano
- Sam Jones – bass
- Charlie Persip – drums
