= African Waltz =

Studio album by Cannonball Adderley
- Released: 1961
- Recorded: February 28, May 9 & 15, 1961
- Studio: Plaza Sound (New York City)
- Genre: Jazz
- Length: 35:04
- Label: Riverside
- Producer: Orrin Keepnews

Cannonball Adderley chronology
Know What I Mean? (1961)	African Waltz (1961)	Plus (1961)

African Waltz is an album by jazz saxophonist Cannonball Adderley, released on the Riverside label and performed by Adderley with an orchestra conducted by Ernie Wilkins. The title track had been a UK hit single for Johnny Dankworth.

== Reception ==
The AllMusic review by Scott Yanow awarded the album three stars and states: "The music on this CD reissue is better than it should be. Cannonball Adderley had a fluke hit with 'African Waltz' so a full album was recorded with the hope of coming up with additional hits... There is some strong material on the set (including 'West Coast Blues', 'Stockholm Sweetnin' ' and a remake of 'This Here') but the results are not too substantial and this was not that big a seller; it is still a reasonably enjoyable effort". The Penguin Guide to Jazz awarded the album three stars stating "'A departure from and an extension of what the Adderleys were doing in their small groups. Ernie Wilkins arranges a set of full-bodied top-heavy charts which Adderley has to jostle with to create their own space, and the music's worth hearing for its Sheer Brashness and impact".

Professional ratings
Review scores
Source	Rating
AllMusic	3/5 stars
DownBeat	3.5/5 stars
The Encyclopedia of Popular Music	5/5 stars
The Penguin Guide to Jazz	3/4 stars

== Track listing ==
1. "Something Different" (Chuck Mangione) – 3:04
2. "West Coast Blues" (Wes Montgomery) – 4:04
3. "Smoke Gets in Your Eyes" (Jerome Kern, Otto Harbach) – 3:02
4. "The Uptown" (Junior Mance) – 2:15
5. "Stockholm Sweetnin'" (Quincy Jones) – 3:41
6. "African Waltz" (Galt MacDermot) – 2:12
7. "Blue Brass Groove" (Nat Adderley) – 4:52
8. "Kelly Blue" (Wynton Kelly) – 3:51
9. "Letter from Home" (Mance) – 2:00
10. "I'll Close My Eyes" (Buddy Kaye, Billy Reid) – 3:42
11. "This Here" (Bobby Timmons) – 3:00 Bonus track on CD
  - Recorded at Plaza Sound Studio, NYC, on February 28 (tracks 6 & 8), May 9 (tracks 1–3, 7, 9 & 11), and May 15 (tracks 4, 5, 10 & 12), 1961.

== Personnel ==
- Cannonball Adderley – alto saxophone
- Nat Adderley, Joe Newman, Ernie Royal, Clark Terry, Nick Travis – trumpet
- Jimmy Cleveland, George Matthews, Arnett Sparrow, Melba Liston – trombone
- Bob Brookmeyer – valve trombone
- Paul Faulise – bass trombone
- Don Butterfield – tuba
- George Dorsey – alto saxophone, flute
- Oliver Nelson – tenor saxophone, flute
- Jerome Richardson – tenor saxophone, flute, piccolo
- Arthur Clarke – baritone saxophone
- Wynton Kelly – piano
- Sam Jones – bass
- Charlie Persip, Louis Hayes – drums
- Michael Olatunji – congas, bongos
- Ray Barretto – congas
- Ernie Wilkins – arranger

Production

- Orrin Keepnews – producer
- Ray Fowler – engineer (recording)
- Ken Deardoff – design
- Hugh Bell – photography (cover)
- Steve Schapiro – photography (liner, back)
