= The Little Giant (album) =

Studio album by Johnny Griffin
- Released: Late November/early December 1959
- Recorded: August 4 & 5, 1959
- Studios: Reeves Sound Studio, NYC
- Genre: Jazz
- Length: 34:16
- Labels: Riverside; RLP 12-304
- Producer: Orrin Keepnews

Johnny Griffin chronology
Way Out! (1958)	The Little Giant (1959)	The Big Soul-Band (1960)

Professional ratings
Review scores
Source	Rating
AllMusic	3/5 stars
DownBeat	4.5/5 stars
The Rolling Stone Jazz Record Guide	5/5 stars
The Penguin Guide to Jazz Recordings	3/4 stars

The Little Giant is an album by jazz saxophonist Johnny Griffin and his all-star sextet, released on the Riverside label in 1959. It was Griffin's third album on Riverside.

"The Little Giant" was Griffin's nickname.

== Track listing ==
1. "Olive Refractions" (Norman Simmons) – 4:17
2. "The Message" (Simmons) – 7:24
3. "Lonely One" (Babs Gonzales) 4:09
4. "63rd Street Theme" (Griffin) – 7:35
5. "Playmates" (Saxie Dowell) – 4:19
6. "Venus and the Moon" (Simmons) – 6:32

== Personnel ==
- Johnny Griffin – tenor saxophone
- Blue Mitchell – trumpet
- Julian Priester – trombone
- Wynton Kelly – piano
- Sam Jones – bass
- Albert "Tootie" Heath – drums
