= Chet Baker Introduces Johnny Pace =

Studio album by Chet Baker and Johnny Pace
- Released: 1959
- Recorded: December 23, 29 & 30, 1958; Reeves Sound Studios, New York City
- Genre: Jazz
- Length: 36:19
- Label: Riverside; RLP 12-292
- Producer: Orrin Keepnews

Chet Baker chronology
Chet Baker in New York (1958)	Chet Baker Introduces Johnny Pace (1959)	Chet (1958)

Chet Baker Introduces Johnny Pace is an album by trumpeter Chet Baker featuring vocalist Johnny Pace which was recorded in 1958 and released on the Riverside label early the following year.

== Reception ==
Professional ratings
Review scores
Source	Rating
Allmusic	3/5 stars

Allmusic awarded the album with 3 stars stating "Pace delivers a winning program of standards in a style that owes an obvious debt to Frank Sinatra, but distinguishes itself by means of fruitier tone and an occasionally pronounced vibrato... Recommended".

== Track listing ==
1. "All or Nothing at All" (Arthur Altman, Jack Lawrence) – 3:21
2. "Crazy She Calls Me" (Bob Russell, Carl Sigman) – 4:13
3. "The Way You Look Tonight" (Dorothy Fields, Jerome Kern) – 3:15
4. "This Is Always" (Mack Gordon, Harry Warren) – 3:38
5. "When the Sun Comes Out" (Harold Arlen, Ted Koehler) – 4:04
6. "What Is There to Say?" (Vernon Duke, Yip Harburg) – 3:41
7. "Ev'rything I've Got" (Lorenz Hart, Richard Rodgers) – 2:44
8. "We Could Make Such Beautiful Music Together" (Henry Manners, Robert Sour) – 3:15
9. "It Might as Well Be Spring" (Oscar Hammerstein II, Rodgers) – 3:53
10. " Yesterdays" (Otto Harbach, Kern) – 5:00
- Recorded at Reeves Sound Studios in New York City on December 23 (tracks 1, 2 & 9), December 29 (tracks 3 & 5–7) and December 30 (tracks 4, 6 & 8), 1958.

== Personnel ==
- Johnny Pace – vocals
- Chet Baker – trumpet
- Herbie Mann – flute
- Joe Berle – piano
- Vinnie Burke – bass
- Philly Joe Jones – drums
- Ed Thigpen - drums
