= Grab This! =

Studio album by Johnny Griffin
- Released: 1962
- Recorded: June 28, 1962; Pacific Jazz Studios, Los Angeles
- Genre: Jazz
- Length: 38:41
- Label: Riverside; RLP 437
- Producer: Orrin Keepnews

Johnny Griffin chronology
Tough Tenor Favorites (1962)	Grab This! (1962)	Soul Groove (1963)

Grab This! is an album by jazz saxophonist Johnny Griffin which was recorded in 1962 and released on the Riverside label.

== Reception ==
Professional ratings
Review scores
Source	Rating
Down Beat	3.5/5 stars
Allmusic	4/5 stars
The Penguin Guide to Jazz Recordings	3/4 stars

The Allmusic site awarded the album 4 stars stating "Grab This! finds tenor Johnny Griffin in a soul-jazz mood... It's amazing that five guys were able to get together and cut this album for Riverside in one day during the summer of 1962... Grab This! is a fine album, and serves as a reminder of Griffin's lovely tenor sound".

== Track listing ==
All compositions by Johnny Griffin except as indicated

1. "Grab This!" - 6:06
2. "63rd Street Theme" - 5:34
3. "Don't Get Around Much Anymore" (Duke Ellington, Bob Russell) - 8:37
4. "Offering Time" (Paul Bryant) - 6:16
5. "These Foolish Things" (Harry Link, Holt Marvell, Jack Strachey) - 6:39
6. "Cherry Float" - 5:29

== Personnel ==
- Johnny Griffin — tenor saxophone
- Paul Bryant - organ
- Joe Pass - guitar
- Jimmy Bond - bass
- Doug Sides - drums
