= Soul Time =

Studio album by Bobby Timmons
- Released: 1960
- Recorded: August 12 and 17, 1960
- Studio: Plaza Sound Studio, New York
- Genre: Jazz
- Label: Riverside
- Producer: Orrin Keepnews

Bobby Timmons chronology
This Here is Bobby Timmons (1960)	Soul Time (1960)	Easy Does It (1961)

Soul Time is a 1960 album by jazz pianist Bobby Timmons featuring Blue Mitchell on trumpet, Sam Jones on bass, and Art Blakey on drums.

After This Here Is Bobby Timmons, this was the second album recorded under Timmons' leadership. He handpicked a cast of jazz musicians to complement his gospel style of jazz. This album contains four songs written by Timmons ("Soul Time", "So Tired", "Stella B." (named for his wife), and "One Mo'"). "The Touch of Your Lips" was written by Ray Noble, "S'posin" was written by Andy Razaf and Paul Denniker, and "You Don't Know What Love Is" was written by Don Raye and Gene de Paul.

== Reception ==
Professional ratings
Review scores
Source	Rating
AllMusic	4/5 stars
The Penguin Guide to Jazz	3/4 stars

Reviewing the album for AllMusic, Scott Yanow wrote:

Pianist Bobby Timmons, best known for his sanctified and funky playing and composing, is mostly heard in a straightahead vein on this CD reissue of a Riverside session. Timmons's four originals ("So Tired" is most memorable) alternate with three standards and are interpreted by a quartet with trumpeter Blue Mitchell, bassist Sam Jones and drummer Art Blakey. The swinging music is well-played, making this a good example of Bobby Timmons playing in a boppish (as opposed to funky) setting.

== Releases ==
The album was re-released on CD, by Hallmark Records in 2013 and on 180 gram vinyl by Jazz Workshop.

== Track listing ==
All compositions by Bobby Timmons except as indicated

Side 1

1. "Soul Time" – 6:18
2. "So Tired" – 6:10
3. "The Touch of Your Lips" (Ray Noble) – 4:10
4. "S'posin" (Andy Razaf, Paul Denniker) – 5:09

Side 2

1. "Stella B." – 5:40
2. "You Don't Know What Love Is" (Don Raye, Gene de Paul) – 6:12
3. "One Mo'" – 6.53
- Recorded August 12 and 17, 1960, at Plaza Sound Studio in New York.

== Personnel ==
- Bobby Timmons – piano
- Blue Mitchell – trumpet
- Sam Jones – bass
- Art Blakey – drums
- Ray Fowler – recording engineer
- Jack Matthews – mastering
