= Chet (Chet Baker album) =

Studio album by Chet Baker
- Released: 1959
- Recorded: December 30, 1958 & January 19, 1959
- Studios: Reeves Sound Studios, New York City
- Genre: Jazz
- Length: 41:48
- Label: Riverside
- Producer: Orrin Keepnews

Chet Baker chronology
Chet Baker Introduces Johnny Pace (1958)	Chet (1959)	Chet Baker Plays the Best of Lerner and Loewe (1959)

Chet is an album by jazz trumpeter Chet Baker first released in 1959. The record is sometimes subtitled The Lyrical Trumpet of Chet Baker. Chet features performances by Baker with alto flautist Herbie Mann, baritone saxophonist Pepper Adams, pianist Bill Evans, guitarist Kenny Burrell, bassist Paul Chambers, and either Connie Kay (on six tracks) or Philly Joe Jones (on four tracks) playing drums. It was recorded in December 1958 and January 1959 and released on the Riverside label.

Though Baker was by the late 1950s known as much for his singing as his trumpet playing, this album is entirely instrumental. It contains 9 standard ballads (and the Chet Baker composition "Early Morning Mood" as an additional bonus track on the CD version) played in the styles of hard bop to cool jazz. Though the album is entirely devoted to explorations of the ballad mood, it includes considerable variety.

The Chambers-Evans-Jones rhythm section played together for several weeks in April and May of 1958 in the band of trumpeter Miles Davis.

== Reception ==
The Allmusic review by Dave Nathan awarded the album 4 stars and states: "Chet is a good album to hear Baker's special way with the horn, and is made even more attractive with the presence and contributions of top jazz artists".

Professional ratings
Review scores
Source	Rating
Allmusic	4/5 stars
Pitchfork	8.0/10
The Rolling Stone Jazz Record Guide	3/5 stars
The Penguin Guide to Jazz Recordings	3/4 stars

== Track listing ==
1. "Alone Together" (Howard Dietz, Arthur Schwartz) - 6:46
2. "How High the Moon" (Nancy Hamilton, Morgan Lewis) - 3:31
3. "It Never Entered My Mind" (Lorenz Hart, Richard Rodgers) - 4:36
4. "'Tis Autumn" (Henry Nemo) - 5:12
5. "If You Could See Me Now" (Tadd Dameron, Carl Sigman) - 5:11
6. "September Song" (Maxwell Anderson, Kurt Weill) - 3:00
7. "You'd Be So Nice to Come Home To" (Cole Porter) - 4:38
8. "Time on My Hands (You in My Arms)" (Vincent Youmans, Harold Adamson, Mack Gordon) - 4:27
9. "You and the Night and the Music" (Howard Dietz, Arthur Schwartz) - 3:50
10. "Early Morning Mood" (Chet Baker) - 9:02 Bonus track on CD

Recorded in New York City on December 30, 1958 (tracks 1–3 & 5–7), and January 19, 1959 (tracks 4 & 8–10).

== Personnel ==
=== December 30, 1958 (Tracks 1–3, 5–7) ===
- Chet Baker – trumpet
- Herbie Mann – alto flute (except tracks 3 & 6)
- Pepper Adams – baritone saxophone (except tracks 3 & 6)
- Bill Evans – piano (except tracks 3 & 6)
- Kenny Burrell – guitar (tracks 3 & 6)
- Paul Chambers – bass
- Connie Kay – drums

=== January 19, 1959 (Tracks 4, 8–10) ===
- Chet Baker – trumpet
- Herbie Mann – alto flute (except track 8)
- Pepper Adams – baritone saxophone (except track 8)
- Bill Evans – piano
- Paul Chambers – bass
- Philly Joe Jones – drums
