= Plus (Cannonball Adderley Quintet album) =

Studio album by The Cannonball Adderley Quintet
- Released: Mid November 1961
- Recorded: May 11, 1961
- Studio: Plaza Sound (New York City)
- Genre: Jazz
- Length: 42:21 original LP; 54:33 CD reissue
- Label: Riverside; RLP 12-388
- Producer: Orrin Keepnews

Cannonball Adderley chronology
| African Waltz (1961) | Plus (1961) | Nancy Wilson/Cannonball Adderley (1961) |

Plus is an album by Cannonball Adderley Quintet released on the Riverside label featuring performances by Adderley with Nat Adderley, Wynton Kelly, Victor Feldman, Sam Jones and Louis Hayes.

The two additional tracks added on the CD reissue, an alternate take of "Lisa" and "O.P.", were discovered in the mid-1980s. The latter is named after Oscar Pettiford, but features a different lineup; for instance, Adderley does not play on it. Producer Keepnews speculated that the second cellist playing was Ron Carter.

== Reception ==
The AllMusic review by Scott Yanow awarded the album 4 stars and states "The music falls between funky soul-jazz and hard bop, and each of the performances (particularly 'Star Eyes' and 'Well You Needn't') is enjoyable." The Penguin Guide to Jazz awarded the album 3 stars stating "Plus brings in Wynton Kelly on a few tracks, enabling Feldman to play some more vibes, but it's otherwise a routine Adderley band date".

Professional ratings
Review scores
| Source | Rating |
|---|---|
| AllMusic | 4/5 stars |
| The Penguin Guide to Jazz | 3/4 stars |

== Track listing ==
1. "Arriving Soon" (Vinson) – 8:11
2. "Well, You Needn't" (Monk) – 6:27
3. "New Delhi" (Victor Feldman) – 6:58
4. "Winetone" (Wynton Kelly) – 6:58
5. "Star Eyes" (Gene de Paul, Raye) – 7:06
6. "Lisa" [Take 8] (Feldman, Phil Zito) – 6:41

Bonus tracks on CD:

7. "Lisa" [Take 3] – 7:00
8. "O.P." (Sam Jones) – 5:12

== Personnel ==
- Cannonball Adderley – alto saxophone
- Nat Adderley – cornet
- Victor Feldman – vibes (tracks 2–5), piano
- Wynton Kelly – piano (except 1, 6, 7)
- Sam Jones – bass
- Louis Hayes – drums
