= Chet Baker in New York =

Studio album by Chet Baker
- Released: 1959
- Recorded: September 1958; Reeves Sound Studios, New York City
- Genre: Jazz
- Length: 51:28
- Label: Riverside; RLP 12-281
- Producer: Orrin Keepnews

Chet Baker chronology
(Chet Baker Sings) It Could Happen to You (1958)	Chet Baker in New York (1959)	Chet Baker Introduces Johnny Pace (1958)

Chet Baker in New York is an album by trumpeter Chet Baker recorded in 1958 and released on the Riverside label early the following year. The album includes a Benny Golson composition, "Fair Weather", that is not to be confused with a Kenny Dorham song of the same name that Baker recorded in 1986 for the Round Midnight soundtrack album.

== Reception ==
Professional ratings
Review scores
Source	Rating
Allmusic	4/5 stars
Pitchfork	7.1/10
The Penguin Guide to Jazz Recordings	3/4 stars
Tom Hull	B+

Allmusic awarded the album with 4 stars, stating: "Chet Baker in New York is a highly recommended entry into Baker's catalog."

== Track listing ==
1. "Fair Weather" (Benny Golson) - 6:58
2. "Polka Dots and Moonbeams" (Johnny Burke, Jimmy Van Heusen) - 7:56
3. "Hotel 49" (Owen Marshall) - 9:48
4. "Solar" (Chuck Wayne) - 5:52
5. "Blue Thoughts" (Golson) - 7:33
6. "When Lights Are Low" (Benny Carter, Spencer Williams) - 6:52
7. "Soft Winds" (Benny Goodman, Fletcher Henderson) - 6:26 Bonus track on CD reissue

== Personnel ==
- Chet Baker - trumpet
- Johnny Griffin - tenor saxophone (tracks 1, 3 & 5)
- Al Haig - piano
- Paul Chambers - bass
- Philly Joe Jones - drums
