= Do Nothing 'til You Hear from Me (album) =

Studio album by Johnny Griffin
- Released: 1963
- Recorded: 1963; New York
- Genre: Jazz
- Length: 38:41
- Label: Riverside; RLP 462
- Producer: Orrin Keepnews

Johnny Griffin chronology
Soul Groove (1963)	Do Nothing 'til You Hear from Me (1963)	Night Lady (1964)

Do Nothing 'til You Hear from Me is an album by jazz saxophonist Johnny Griffin which was recorded in 1963 and released on the Riverside label.

== Reception ==
Professional ratings
Review scores
Source	Rating
Allmusic	3/5 stars
The Penguin Guide to Jazz Recordings	3/4 stars

The Allmusic site awarded the album 3 stars stating "Johnny Griffin, known as the world's fastest tenor-saxophonist in the late 1950s, purposely slowed down a bit on some of his later Riverside albums including this set... The music swings and the classic tenorman cuts loose a few times, making for enjoyable if not quite essential music".

== Track listing ==
All compositions by Johnny Griffin except as indicated

1. "Do Nothing till You Hear from Me" (Duke Ellington, Bob Russell) - 5:37
2. "The Midnight Sun Will Never Set" (Dorcas Cochran, Quincy Jones, Henri Salvador) - 4:59
3. "That's All" (Alan Brandt, Bob Haymes) - 6:24
4. "Slow Burn" - 8:14
5. "Wonder Why" (Nicholas Brodzsky, Sammy Cahn) - 5:23
6. "Heads Up" - 5:36

== Personnel ==
- Johnny Griffin - tenor saxophone
- Buddy Montgomery - vibraphone, piano
- Monk Montgomery - bass
- Art Taylor - drums
