= Way Out! =

Studio album by Johnny Griffin
- Released: November 1958
- Recorded: February 26–27, 1958; New York City
- Genre: Jazz
- Length: 42:51
- Label: Riverside; RLP 12-274
- Producer: Orrin Keepnews

Johnny Griffin chronology
JG (1958)	Way Out! (1958)	The Little Giant (1959)

Way Out! is an album by jazz saxophonist Johnny Griffin, released on the Riverside label in 1958.

== Reception ==
Professional ratings
Review scores
Source	Rating
AllMusic	4/5 stars
The Rolling Stone Jazz Record Guide	5/5 stars
The Penguin Guide to Jazz Recordings	3.5/4 stars

AllMusic reviewer Scott Yanow wrote that "the tenor is in superior form for this spirited date."

== Track listing ==
1. "Where's Your Overcoat, Boy?" (Richard Evans) – 6:20
2. "Hot Sausage" (Jody Christian) – 4:07
3. "Sunny Monday" (John Hines) – 9:58
4. "Cherokee" (Ray Noble) – 6:47
5. "Teri's Tune" (Teri Thornton) – 8:06
6. "Little John" (Hines) – 7:33

== Personnel ==
- Johnny Griffin – tenor saxophone
- Kenny Drew – piano
- Wilbur Ware – bass
- Philly Joe Jones – drums
