= Wilbur Ware =

American bassist (1923–1979)

- Born: Wilbur Bernard Ware; September 8, 1923; Chicago, Illinois, U.S.
- Died: September 9, 1979 (aged 56) Philadelphia, Pennsylvania, U.S.
- Genres: Jazz
- Occupation: Musician
- Instrument: Double bass

Wilbur Bernard Ware (September 8, 1923 – September 9, 1979) was an American jazz double bassist. He was a regular bassist for the Riverside record label in the 1950s, and he recorded regularly in that decade with Johnny Griffin, Kenny Dorham, Kenny Drew, and Thelonious Monk. He also appeared on records released by J.R. Monterose, Toots Thielemans, Sonny Clark, Tina Brooks, Zoot Sims, Archie Shepp, and Grant Green, among others.

== Career ==
Ware grew up in Chicago where he taught himself to play drums, banjo, and bass while playing at church. In the 1940s, he worked with Stuff Smith, Sonny Stitt, and Roy Eldridge. He recorded with Sun Ra in the early 1950s. Later in the 1950s, settling in New York City, Ware played with Eddie Vinson, Art Blakey, and Buddy DeFranco. His only album recorded as a leader and released during his lifetime was The Chicago Sound, from 1957 when he worked for Riverside. He made jazz instructional albums for Music Minus One. In 1958, Ware was one of 57 jazz musicians to appear in the photograph A Great Day in Harlem.

Ware was a member of the Thelonious Monk quartet from 1957 to 1958. He also performed and recorded in 1957 with the Sonny Rollins Trio at the Village Vanguard. Largely self taught, Ware had an unorthodox but highly unique and percussive approach to the bass.

Ware's addiction to narcotics resulted in his return to Chicago in 1963 and then to a period of incarceration. He was inactive musically for about six years. In 1969, Ware played with Clifford Jordan, Elvin Jones, and Sonny Rollins. He died from emphysema in Philadelphia, Pennsylvania, in 1979.

== Discography ==
=== As leader ===
- The Chicago Sound with Johnny Griffin (Riverside, 1957)
- Super Bass (Wilbur Ware Institute, 2012) – With Clifford Jordan; recorded for Strata-East in 1968 but not released for more than 40 years

=== As sideman ===
With Walt Dickerson

- Tell Us Only the Beautiful Things (Whynot, 1975)
- Walt Dickerson 1976 (Whynot, 1976)

With Kenny Drew

- A Harry Warren Showcase (Judson, 1957)
- A Harold Arlen Showcase (Judson, 1957)
- I Love Jerome Kern (Riverside, 1957)
- This Is New (Riverside, 1957)
- Pal Joey (Riverside, 1957)

With Johnny Griffin

- Johnny Griffin (Argo, 1956)
- Johnny Griffin Sextet (Riverside, 1958)
- Way Out! (Riverside, 1958)

With Ernie Henry

- Presenting Ernie Henry (Riverside, 1956)
- Seven Standards and a Blues (Riverside, 1957)
- Last Chorus (Riverside, 1958)

With Clifford Jordan

- Jenkins, Jordan and Timmons (Prestige, 1957)
- Starting Time (Jazzland, 1961)
- In the World (Strata-East, 1972)
- Remembering Me-Me (Muse, 1977)

With Thelonious Monk

- Thelonious Himself (Riverside, 1957)
- Monk's Music (Riverside, 1957)
- Mulligan Meets Monk (Riverside, 1957)
- Thelonious Monk with John Coltrane (Jazzland, 1961)

With others

- Art Blakey, Originally (Columbia, 1982)
- Tina Brooks, The Waiting Game (Blue Note, 1961)
- Sonny Clark, Dial "S" for Sonny (Blue Note, 1957)
- Kenny Dorham, 2 Horns / 2 Rhythm (Riverside, 1957)
- Matthew Gee, Jazz by Gee (Riverside, 1956)
- Grant Green, Remembering (Blue Note, 1961)
- Herbie Mann, The Jazz We Heard Last Summer (Savoy, 1957)
- Blue Mitchell, Big 6 (Riverside, 1958)
- Hank Mobley, Hank (Blue Note, 1957)
- Charles Moffett, The Gift (Savoy, 1969)
- J. R. Monterose, J. R. Monterose (Blue Note, 1957)
- Lee Morgan, Lee Morgan Indeed! (Blue Note, 1956)
- Cecil Payne, Zodiac (Strata-East, 1973)
- Rita Reys, The Cool Voice of Rita Reys (Columbia, 1956)
- Sonny Rollins, Night at the Village Vanguard (Blue Note, 1958)
- Nina Simone, Nina Simone at Town Hall (Colpix, 1959) – live
- Zoot Sims, Zoot! (Riverside, 1956)
- Toots Thielemans, Man Bites Harmonica! (Riverside, 1958)
