= The Big Soul-Band =

Studio album by Johnny Griffin Orchestra
- Released: September/October 1960
- Recorded: May 24, 31 & June 3, 1960
- Studio: Plaza Sound Studios, NYC
- Genre: Jazz
- Length: 39:07 original LP
- Label: Riverside; RLP 331
- Producer: Orrin Keepnews

Johnny Griffin chronology
The Little Giant (1959)	The Big Soul-Band (1960)	Battle Stations (1960)

Professional ratings
Review scores
Source	Rating
Allmusic	3/5 stars
The Rolling Stone Jazz Record Guide	3/5 stars
The Penguin Guide to Jazz Recordings	3/4 stars

The Big Soul-Band (also released as Wade in the Water) is an album by the Johnny Griffin Orchestra, led by jazz saxophonist Johnny Griffin, featuring arrangements by Norman Simmons. It was released on the Riverside label in 1960.

== Track listing ==
1. "Wade in the Water" (Traditional) - 3:50 Bonus track on CD reissue
2. "Wade in the Water" - 3:46
3. "Panic Room Blues" (Norman Simmons) - 4:36
4. "Nobody Knows the Trouble I've Seen" (Traditional) - 2:43
5. "Meditation" (Simmons) - 8:21
6. "Holla" (Simmons) - 3:38
7. "So Tired" (Bobby Timmons) - 6:38
8. "Deep River" (Traditional) - 5:28
9. "Jubilation" (Junior Mance) - 3:57

Tracks 1, 2, 3 and 8 recorded on May 24, 1960; 6, 7 and 9 on May 31; tracks 4–5 recorded on June 3, 1960.

== Personnel ==
- Johnny Griffin - tenor saxophone
- Clark Terry, Bob Bryant - trumpet
- Julian Priester, Matthew Gee - trombone
- Pat Patrick - alto sax (#1, 2, 3, 8)
- Frank Strozier - alto sax (#4, 5, 6, 7, 9)
- Edwin Williams - tenor sax
- Charles Davis - baritone sax
- Harold Mabern - piano (all tracks except #5)
- Bobby Timmons - piano (#5), celeste (#4)
- Bob Cranshaw - bass (#1, 2, 3, 8)
- Victor Sproles - bass (#4, 5, 6, 7, 9)
- Charlie Persip - drums
- Norman Simmons - arranger
