= (Chet Baker Sings) It Could Happen to You =

It Could Happen to You

Studio album by Chet Baker
- Released: November 3, 1958
- Recorded: August 1958; Reeves Sound Studios, New York City
- Genre: Jazz
- Length: 52:39 (2010 reissue)
- Label: Riverside; RLP 12-278
- Producer: Bill Grauer

Chet Baker chronology
Stan Meets Chet (1958)	It Could Happen to You (1958)	Chet Baker in New York (1958)

(Chet Baker Sings) It Could Happen to You is an album by jazz trumpeter and vocalist Chet Baker. It follows a formula similar to two other Baker albums, Chet Baker Sings (1954) and Chet Baker Sings and Plays with Bud Shank, Russ Freeman & Strings (recorded in 1955, released in 1964) in which he sings traditional pop standards in a jazzy fashion. Unlike those records, It Could Happen to You features songs with Baker playing no trumpet whatsoever, opting to scat in place of an instrumental solo.

In 2010, it was remastered and reissued on CD by Original Jazz Classics with two previously unissued takes.

== Reception ==
Professional ratings
Review scores
Source	Rating
Allmusic	4/5 stars
Pitchfork	8.3/10
The Penguin Guide to Jazz Recordings	3/4 stars

The Allmusic review by Lindsay Planer awarded the album 4 stars and states:

One immediate distinction between these vocal sides and those recorded earlier in the decade for Pacific Jazz is the lissome quality of Baker's playing and, most notably, his increased capacity as a vocalist. The brilliant song selection certainly doesn't hurt either. This is an essential title in Chet Baker's 30-plus year canon

— Planer, Lindsay Allmusic review

== Track listing ==
No.	Title	Writer(s)	Length
1.	"Do It the Hard Way"	Richard Rodgers, Lorenz Hart	3:00
2.	"I'm Old Fashioned"	Jerome Kern, Johnny Mercer	5:03
3.	"You're Driving Me Crazy"	Walter Donaldson	2:53
4.	"It Could Happen to You"	Jimmy Van Heusen, Johnny Burke	2:49
5.	"My Heart Stood Still"	Richard Rodgers, Lorenz Hart	3:26
6.	"The More I See You"	Harry Warren, Mack Gordon	3:03
7.	"Everything Happens to Me"	Matt Dennis, Tom Adair	5:02
8.	"Dancing on the Ceiling"	Richard Rodgers, Lorenz Hart	3:08
9.	"How Long Has This Been Going On?"	George Gershwin, Ira Gershwin	4:10
10.	"Old Devil Moon"	Burton Lane, E.Y. Harburg	2:59

=== 1987 CD reissue bonus tracks ===
No.	Title	Writer(s)	Length
11.	"While My Lady Sleeps"	Bronisław Kaper, Gus Kahn	4:21
12.	"You Make Me Feel So Young"	Josef Myrow, Mack Gordon	3:38

=== 2010 CD reissue ===
1. "Do It the Hard Way" – 3:03
2. "I'm Old Fashioned" – 5:06
3. "You're Driving Me Crazy" – 2:56
4. "It Could Happen to You" – 2:53
5. "My Heart Stood Still" – 3:28
6. "The More I See You" – 3:06
7. "Everything Happens to Me" – 5:05
8. "Dancing on the Ceiling" – 3:09
9. "How Long Has This Been Going On?" – 4:10
10. "Old Devil Moon" – 2:58
11. "While My Lady Sleeps" [Take 10] – 4:22
12. "You Make Me Feel So Young" [Take 5] – 3:41
13. "The More I See You" [Take 8] – 2:51
14. "Everything Happens to Me" [Take 2] – 4:51

== Personnel ==
- Chet Baker – vocals, trumpet
- Kenny Drew – piano
- George Morrow (#1–2, 5, 7–8, 14), Sam Jones (#3–4, 6, 9–13) – bass
- Philly Joe Jones (#1–2, 5–8, 10–14), Dannie Richmond (#3–4, 9) – drums
