= Johnny Griffin =

American jazz saxophonist (1928–2008)

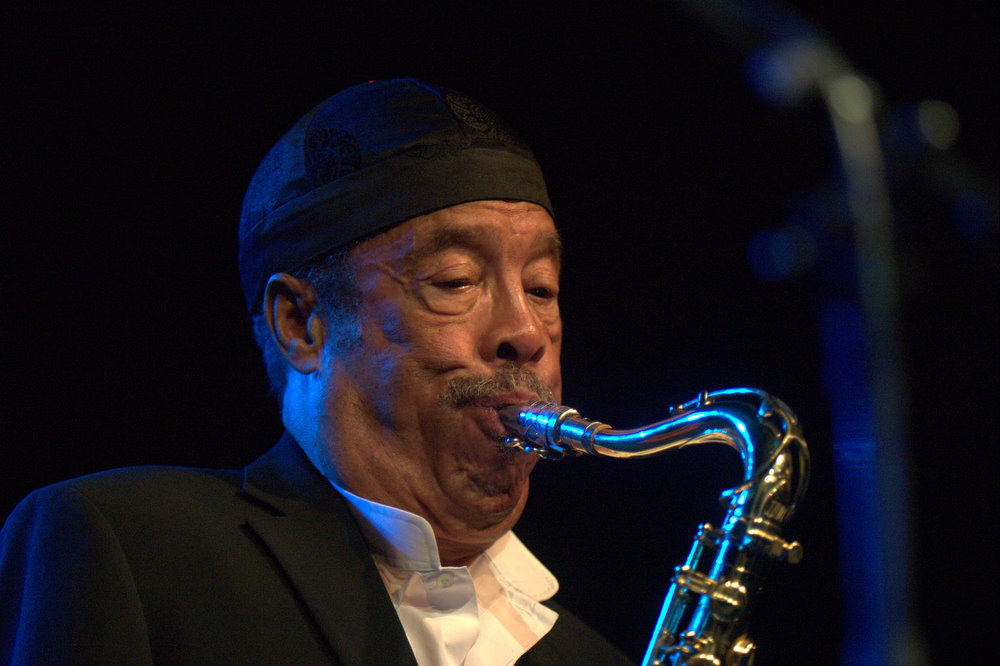
- Griffin performing in 2007

Background information
- Born: John Arnold Griffin III; April 24, 1928; Chicago, Illinois, U.S
- Died: July 25, 2008 (aged 80) Availles-Limouzine, France
- Genres: Jazz
- Occupation: Musician
- Instrument: Tenor saxophone
- Years active: 1940s–2008
- Labels: Blue Note, Riverside

John Arnold Griffin III (April 24, 1928 – July 25, 2008) was an American jazz tenor saxophonist. Nicknamed "the Little Giant" for his short stature and forceful playing, Griffin began his career in the mid-1940s and continued until the month of his death. A pioneering figure in hard bop, Griffin recorded prolifically as a bandleader in addition to stints with the pianist Thelonious Monk and the drummer Art Blakey, in partnership with his fellow tenor Eddie "Lockjaw" Davis, and as a member of the Kenny Clarke/Francy Boland Big Band after he moved to Europe in the 1960s. In 1995, Griffin was awarded an Honorary Doctorate of Music from Berklee College of Music.

== Early life and career ==
Griffin studied music at DuSable High School in Chicago under Walter Dyett, starting out on clarinet before moving on to oboe and then alto saxophone. While still at high school at the age of 15, Griffin was playing with T-Bone Walker in a band led by Walker's brother.

Alto saxophone was still his instrument of choice when he joined Lionel Hampton's big band, three days after his high school graduation, but Hampton encouraged him to take up the tenor, playing alongside Arnett Cobb. He first appeared on a Los Angeles recording with Hampton's band in 1945 at the age of 17.

By mid-1947, Griffin and fellow Hampton band member Joe Morris, had formed a sextet made up of local musicians, including George Freeman, where he remained for the next two years. His playing can be heard on early rhythm and blues recordings for Atlantic Records. By 1951, Griffin was playing baritone saxophone in an R&B septet led by former bandmate Arnett Cobb.

After returning to Chicago from two years in the Army, Griffin began to establish a reputation as one of the premiere saxophonists in that city. Thelonious Monk enthusiastically encouraged Orrin Keepnews of the Riverside label to sign the young tenor, but before he could act Blue Note had signed Griffin.

He joined Art Blakey's Jazz Messengers in 1957, and his recordings from that time include an album joining together the Messengers and Thelonious Monk. Griffin then succeeded John Coltrane as a member of Monk's Five Spot quartet; he can be heard on the albums Thelonious in Action and Misterioso.

Griffin's unique style, based on an astounding technique, included a vast canon of bebop language. He was known to quote generously from classical, opera and other musical forms. A prodigious player, he was often subjected to "cutting sessions" (a musical battle between two musicians) involving a legion of tenor players, both in his hometown Chicago with Hank Mobley and Gene Ammons, and on the road. Diminutive, he was distinctive as a fashionable dresser, a good businessman, and a well-liked bandleader to other musicians.

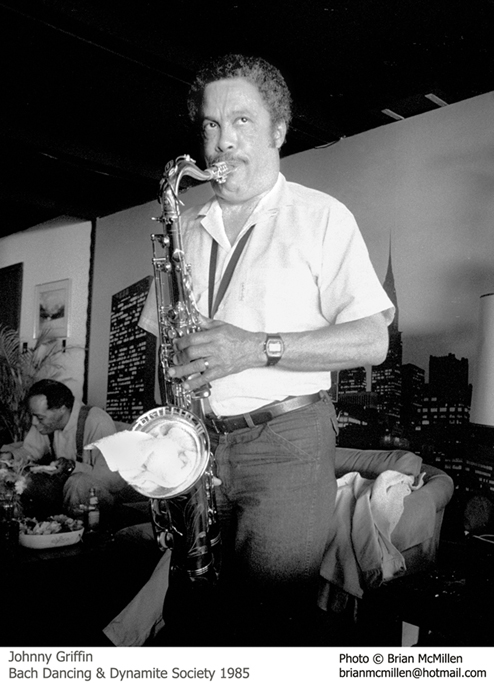
Johnny Griffin backstage at Bach Dancing & Dynamite Society, Half Moon Bay, California, 1985

Griffin was leader on his first Blue Note album Introducing Johnny Griffin in 1956. Also featuring Wynton Kelly on piano, Curly Russell on bass and Max Roach on drums, the recording brought Griffin critical acclaim.

The album A Blowin' Session (1957) featured John Coltrane and Hank Mobley. He played with Art Blakey's Jazz Messengers for a few months in 1957 and in the Thelonious Monk Sextet and Quartet (1958). During this period, he recorded a set with Clark Terry on Serenade to a Bus Seat, featuring the rhythm trio of Wynton Kelly, Paul Chambers, and Philly Joe Jones.

=== Move to Europe ===
Griffin moved to France in 1963 and to the Netherlands in 1978, where he settled in Bergambacht. His relocation was the result of several factors, including income tax problems, a failing marriage and feeling "embittered by the critical acceptance of free jazz" in the United States, as journalist Ben Ratliff wrote. Apart from appearing regularly under his own name at jazz clubs such as London's Ronnie Scott's, Griffin became a "first choice" sax player for visiting US musicians touring the continent during the 1960s and 1970s.

In 1965, he recorded albums with Wes Montgomery. He briefly rejoined Monk's groups (an Octet and Nonet) in 1967. From 1967 to 1969, he was part of the Kenny Clarke/Francy Boland Big Band.

Griffin and Davis met up again in 1970 and recorded Tough Tenors Again 'n' Again, and again with the Dizzy Gillespie Big 7 at the Montreux Jazz Festival. In the late 1970s, Griffin recorded with Peter Herbolzheimer and His Big Band, which also included, among others, Nat Adderley, Derek Watkins, Art Farmer, Slide Hampton, Jiggs Whigham, Herb Geller, Wilton Gaynair, Stan Getz, Gerry Mulligan, Rita Reys, Jean "Toots" Thielemans, Niels-Henning Ørsted Pedersen, Grady Tate, and Quincy Jones as arranger.

He also recorded with the Nat Adderley Quintet in 1978, having previously recorded with Adderley in 1958.

In 1978, Griffin and Dexter Gordon returned to the U.S., and the two performed at the Ann Arbor's Eclipse Jazz Festival, before recording Live at Carnegie Hall.

Griffin's last concert was in Hyères, France on July 21, 2008. On July 25, 2008, he died of a heart attack at the age of 80 in Mauprévoir, near Availles-Limouzine, France.

== Discography ==
=== As leader/co-leader ===
==== Studio albums ====
Year	Title	Label	Year recorded	Notes
1957	Introducing Johnny Griffin	Blue Note	1956	
1957	A Blowin' Session	Blue Note	1957	
1958	The Congregation	Blue Note	1957	
1958	Johnny Griffin	Argo	1956	
1958	Johnny Griffin Sextet	Riverside	1958	
1958	Way Out!	Riverside	1958	
1959	The Little Giant	Riverside	1959	
1960	The Big Soul-Band	Riverside	1960	
1960	Battle Stations	Prestige	1960	with Eddie "Lockjaw" Davis
1960	Johnny Griffin's Studio Jazz Party	Riverside	1960	
1960	Tough Tenors	Jazzland	1960	with Eddie "Lockjaw" Davis
1961	Lookin' at Monk!	Jazzland	1961	with Eddie "Lockjaw" Davis
1961	Change of Pace	Riverside	1961	
1961	Blues Up & Down	Jazzland	1961	with Eddie "Lockjaw" Davis
1961	White Gardenia	Riverside	1961	
1962	The Kerry Dancers	Riverside	1961–62	
1962	Tough Tenor Favorites	Jazzland	1962	with Eddie "Lockjaw" Davis
1962	Grab This!	Riverside	1962	
1963	Do Nothing 'til You Hear from Me	Riverside	1963	
1964	Soul Groove	Atlantic	1963	with Matthew Gee
1964	Night Lady	Philips	1964	
1969	The Man I Love	Polydor	1967	
1969	Lady Heavy Bottom's Waltz	Vogue	1968	
1970	Tough Tenors Again 'n' Again	MPS	1970	
1972	You Leave Me Breathless	Black Lion	1967	
1977	Jazz Undulation	Joker	1968	
1978	Sincerely Ours	Four Leaf Clover	1978-05	with Rolf Ericson
1979	A Night in Tunisia	Trio	1967	
1978	Birds and Ballads	Galaxy	1978?	
1979	Return of the Griffin	Galaxy	1978-10-17	
1979	Bush Dance	Galaxy	1978-10-18, -19	
1982	To the Ladies	Galaxy	1979	
1982	Meeting	Jeton (Germany)	1980	
1983	Call It Whachawana	Galaxy	1983	
1997	Tough Tenors Back Again!	Storyville	1984	with Eddie "Lockjaw" Davis
1997	Three Generations of Tenor Saxophone	JHM	1985	2xCD
1989	Have You Met Barcelona	Orange Blue	1987	with Ben Sidran et al.
1988	Take My Hand	Who's Who in Jazz	1988	
1991	The Cat	Antilles	1990	
1993	Dance of Passion	Antilles	1992	
1994	Chicago, New York, Paris	Verve	1994	
2000	In and Out	Dreyfus	1999	with Martial Solal
2001	Johnny Griffin and Steve Grossman Quintet	Dreyfus	2000	with Steve Grossman
2000	Close Your Eyes	Minor Music	2000	with Horace Parlan
2003	Johnny Griffin and the Great Danes	Stunt	2002	with the Great Danes

==== Live albums ====
Year	Title	Label	Year recorded	Notes
1961	The Tenor Scene	Prestige	1961-01-06	with Eddie "Lockjaw" Davis
1964	The First Set	Prestige	1961-01-06	with Eddie "Lockjaw" Davis
1964	The Midnight Show	Prestige	1961-01-06	with Eddie "Lockjaw" Davis
1965	The Late Show	Prestige	1961-01-06	with Eddie "Lockjaw" Davis
1973	Blues for Harvey	SteepleChase	1973	
1974	Johnny Griffin Live at Music Inn	Horo	1974	
1976	Johnny Griffin Live in Tokyo	Philips	1976	
1977	The Little Giant Revisited	Philips	1976	
1978	The Jamfs Are Coming!	Timeless	1975	
1981	NYC Underground	Galaxy	1979	
1984	Johnny Griffin Quartet – Live: Jazzbühne Berlin '84	Amiga Jazz (Germany)	1984	
1997	Live / Autumn Leaves	Verve	1981	
2023	Live at Ronnie Scott's, 8th January 1964	Gearbox	1964-01-08	2xLP

=== As sideman ===
With Ahmed Abdul-Malik

- Jazz Sahara (Riverside, 1958)
- East Meets West (RCA Victor, 1960)

With Nat Adderley

- Branching Out (Riverside, 1958)
- A Little New York Midtown Music (Galaxy, 1978)

With Art Blakey

- Selections from Lerner and Loewe's... (Vik, 1957)
- A Night in Tunisia (Vik, 1957)
- Cu-Bop (Jubilee, 1957)
- Art Blakey's Jazz Messengers with Thelonious Monk (Atlantic, 1957)
- Hard Drive (Bethlehem, 1957)

With the Kenny Clarke/Francy Boland Big Band

- Sax No End (SABA, 1967)
- Out of the Folk Bag (Columbia, 1967)
- 17 Men and Their Music (Campi, 1967)
- All Smiles (MPS, 1968)
- Faces (MPS, 1969)
- Latin Kaleidoscope (MPS, 1968)
- Fellini 712 (MPS, 1969)
- All Blues (MPS, 1969)
- More Smiles (MPS, 1969)
- Volcano (Polydor, 1969)
- Clarke Boland Big Band en Concert avec Europe 1 (Tréma, 1992) – recorded in 1969

With Dizzy Gillespie

- The Giant (America, 1973)
- The Source (America, 1973)
- The Dizzy Gillespie Big 7 (Pablo, 1975)

With Philly Joe Jones

- Blues for Dracula (Riverside, 1958)
- Look Stop Listen (Uptown, 1983) with Dameronia

With Thelonious Monk

- Thelonious in Action (Riverside, 1958) – live
- Misterioso (Riverside, 1958) – live

With Bud Powell

- Bud in Paris (1975, Xanadu) – live recorded in 1960
- Earl Bud Powell, Vol. 8: Holidays in Edenville, 64 (Mythic Sound, 1964)

With A. K. Salim

- Stable Mates (Savoy, 1957)
- Pretty for the People (Savoy, 1958) – recorded in 1957

With others

- Chet Baker, Chet Baker in New York (Riverside, 1958)
- Count Basie, Count Basie Jam Session at the Montreux Jazz Festival 1975 (Pablo, 1975)
- James Carter, Live at Baker's Keyboard Lounge (Warner Bros., 2004) – recorded in 2001
- Tadd Dameron, The Magic Touch (Riverside, 1962)
- Bennie Green, Glidin' Along (Jazzland, 1961)
- Johnny Lytle, Nice and Easy (Jazzland, 1962)
- Blue Mitchell, Big 6 (Riverside 1958)
- Jimmy Smith, Keep On Comin' (Elektra/Musician, 1983)
- Ira Sullivan, Blue Stroll (Delmark, 1961)
- Clark Terry, Serenade to a Bus Seat (Riverside, 1957)
- Wilbur Ware, The Chicago Sound (Riverside, 1957)
- Randy Weston, Little Niles (United Artists, 1958)
- Wes Montgomery, Full House (Riverside, 1962)
- Wes Montgomery, Solitude (Paris Live Album) (Verve, 1962)
- Roy Hargrove, With the Tenors of Our Time (Verve, 1994)

== Bibliography ==
- Mike Hennessey The Little Giant: The Story of Johnny Griffin. London: Northway Publications, 2008. ISBN 978-0-9550908-5-1
