= Jesse Miller (musician) =

American jazz musician (1921–1950)

Jesse Miller, Jr. (August 16, 1921 – January 24, 1950) was an American jazz trumpeter and bandleader.

Born in Houston, Texas, he moved to Chicago, where he studied under Captain Walter Dyett at the DuSable High School. Turning professional in 1940, he played in the bands of Tiny Bradshaw and King Kolax. He went on to join Milt Larkin's house band at the Rhumboogie in 1941, with Calvin Ladnier, Clarence Trice and Miller on trumpets, Arnett Sparrow and Streamline Williams on trombones, Frank Dominguez, Tom Archia (billed as Ernest Archey), Moses Grant and Sam Player on saxes, Cedric Haywood on piano, Lawrerence Cato on bass and Alvin Burroughs on drums.

In 1942, he was a member of Earl Hines' orchestra featuring Billy Eckstine on vocals (with George Dixon, Pee Wee Jackson, Shorts McConnell, and Miller on trumpets, Jo McLewis, George Hunt, Gerry Valentine on trombones, Budd Johnson, Robert Crowder (tenor sax), Leroy Harris, Jr., Scoops Carry (alto sax), Hines on piano, Clifford Best on guitar), Truck Parham on bass, and Rudy Taylor on drums. He was in the following line-up when Sarah Vaughan joined it (with Dizzy Gillespie, McConnell, Miller and Gail Brockman on trumpets, Charlie Parker and Thomas Crump on tenor saxes, Andrew "Goon" Gardner and Carry on alto saxes, John Williams on baritone, Cliff Smalls (also on piano), Gus Chappell, Bennie Green and Howard "Scotty" Scott (later Mohammed Sadiq) on trombones, Wilson on drums, Connie Wainwright on guitar and Paul O. Simpson and/or Ted "Mohawk" Sturgis on bass).

In April 1944, he recorded with a line-up featuring Eddie Johnson, Jimmy Jones, John Levy and Alvin Burroughs.

In August 1944, Ben Webster took up a residency, which lasted until January 1945, at the Garrick Lounge's Garrick Stage, where his band alternated with Miller's band, with Webster often sitting in with them. Miller's band at the time comprised Johnny Board, Argonne Thornton (Hadik Hakim), Rail Wilson and Hillard Brown. Webster took Miller's rhythm section with him to his next booking at New York's Onyx Club.

Miller also led a band at Joe's Deluxe Club with Ike Day on drums, and went on to lead the house band at Club DeLisa, taking over from Red Saunders, from June 1945 to February 1946, when Fletcher Henderson took up the residency. It's likely that during these two residencies is when Sun Ra collaborated with both bandleaders as arranger and/or pianist.

Shortly after recording with Gene Ammons, on October 4, 1949, he was diagnosed with Hodgkin's Disease, and died within a few months.

== Discography ==
=== As sideman ===
- Gene Ammons, Soulful Saxophone (Chess, 1959)
- Gene Ammons, Jug and Sonny (Chess, 1960)
- Earl Hines, Piano Man (Bluebird, 1989)
