= Leroy Harris =

Leroy Harris may refer to:

- Leroy Harris (offensive lineman) (born 1984), American football offensive lineman
- Leroy Harris (running back) (born 1954), former American football running back
- Leroy Harris, Sr. (died 1969), American jazz musician
- Leroy Harris, Jr. (1916–2005), American jazz musician
