= Walter Buchanan (musician) =

American jazz musician (1914–1988)

- Born: June 26, 1914; Huntsville, Alabama
- Died: May 1988 (aged 73); Pittsburgh, Pennsylvania
- Citizenship: American
- Occupation: Jazz bassist
- Spouse: Dinah Washington (m. 1950; div. 1952)

Walter Solomon Buchanan Jr. (June 26, 1914 – May 1988), also known as "Little Man" Buchanan, was an American jazz bassist known for his work in the late 1940s-early 1950s as a member of various line-ups led by saxophonist Arnett Cobb.

== Personal life ==
Buchanan was born in Huntsville, Alabama on June 26, 1914 to Walter Buchanan Sr. (1882–1954) and Ida Councill (1889–1947). His father came from Pittsburgh, Pennsylvania, and was President of Alabama A&M University from 1909 to 1920, before switching career to become a real estate broker.

In April 1944, he was playing in a band led by Jesse Miller at Joe's Deluxe Club, in Chicago, with Albert Atkinson (sax), Ike Day, Argonne Thornton (piano), and Kermit Scott. On January 12, 1949 he recorded with Milt Larkin's band for Savoy Records together with Buck Clayton, Hal Singer, George Rhodes on piano, and Joe Harris on drums. In February 1949 he recorded again for Savoy, as a member of the Hal Singer Sextet, comprising Tate Houston, Buchanan, Butch Ballard, George Rhodes, Chippy Outcalt and Willie Moore, and on the same session, the same line-up recorded another track backing Chicago Davis. An August 1949 issue of Down Beat features a photograph by William P. Gottlieb showing Buchanan onstage with Cobb at the Apollo Theater, New York.

In October 1950, he married Dinah Washington, in Baltimore, Maryland. His brother, Councill, acted as best man. Their marriage broke up only a few months later. In February 1951 he is credited as backing Washington on four tracks for Mercury Records. The line-up is unknown except for Wynton Kelly. Due to the imminent breakup of their marriage, however, some sources suggest that Buchanan would probably not have attended the recording session.

Buchanan then recorded on a series of sessions with different line-ups led by Cobb and, in August 1951, with a septet comprising Cobb, Willie Moore, Dickie Harris, Johnny Griffin, George Rhodes, Buchanan, and Al Walker on drums. In June 1953 he recorded again with Cobb, this time billed as Arnett Cobb and His Orchestra, with Ed "Tiger" Lewis (trumpet), Dickie Harris (trombone), Cobb, Charlie Ferguson (tenor, baritone saxophone), George Rhodes (piano), Walter Buchanan (bass), and Al Walker (drums). Arnett Cobb & His Orchestra recorded again, on an unknown date, with a different line-up, this time comprising Buchanan, George Jones on drums, George Rhodes, Cobb, Michael "Booty" Wood and David Page on trumpet.

Buchanan died in Pittsburgh in May 1988, at the age of 73.

== Discography ==
With Arnett Cobb

- Arnett Blows for 1300 (Delmark, 1947 [1994])
