= Lurlean Hunter =

American singer

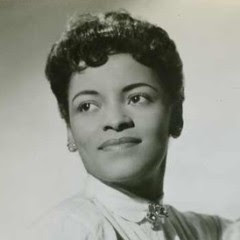

Background information
- Born: December 1, 1919; Duncan, Mississippi
- Died: March 11, 1983 (aged 63) Kalamazoo, Michigan
- Occupation: Singer
- Spouses: Charles Taylor (m. 1952); Gregory Tischler (2 children)

Lurlean Hunter (December 1, 1919 – March 11, 1983) was an American contralto singer.

== Early life ==
Lurlean Hunter was born on December 1, 1919 in Duncan, Mississippi. Her family moved to Chicago when she was two months old. She attended Englewood High School in Chicago.

== Career ==
Hunter's first paid singing performance started with Red Saunders and his orchestra at Club DeLisa on Chicago's South Side. She was signed by Discovery Records in 1950.

In 1951, Hunter was a featured performer with George Shearing and his quintet at Birdland in New York City. Later that year, she was among a group of "rising young stars of jazz" presented at the Streamliner night club in Chicago. Other Chicago venues at which she performed included the Club Silhouette and the Cloister Inn, where an initial four-week booking turned into a 2.5-year stay. Her work in other cities included singing at the Jazz Villa in St. Louis, the Roosevelt Hotel in New York, and the Circus Lounge in Ottawa, Ontario, Canada. In 1957, she appeared on the Nat King Cole Show where she sang "It Never Entered My Mind".

In 1960, Hunter began recording for Atlantic, with "Blue & Sentimental" as her first album for that label. She had previously recorded for RCA Victor in 1956-1958.

In 1963, Hunter became the first African-American performer hired by WBBM radio in Chicago. After a successful on-air audition, she became a member of the staff of the all-live Music Wagon Show. On August 2, 1968, National Educational Television jazz broadcast featured Hunter, accompanied by the Vernel Fournier Trio, performing "ballads and blues, old and new".

Hunter made commercials for products such as peas and telephone directories.

== "Lonesome Gal" court case ==
In 1958, radio disc jockey Jean King, who broadcast using the name "Lonesome Girl," sued RCA Record Division after it used Lurlean Hunter's image and name on the cover of its "Lonesome Gal" record album (LPM-1151, 1956). The suit in United States District Court, Southern District of California, alleged "unfair competition, infringement of trade name, unfair business practices, unjust enrichment and invasion of the right of privacy." The court acknowledged that the album contained the song "Lonesome Gal", and that the use of one song's title for an album's title was common practice in the recording industry. However, it ruled in King's favor on the basis that she was the first person to "adopt and establish the name Lonesome Gal as a personality" and that name was exclusively associated with her. Damages of $22,500 were awarded to King, and the company was ordered to destroy all material containing Hunter's likeness in conjunction with "Lonesome Gal".

== Personal life ==
On December 7, 1952, Hunter married Charles Taylor, a shoe salesman. She later married Greg Tischler, who also was her manager. She had two children, a son (Tav Joseph Hunter) and a daughter (Seann Lurean Tischler).

== Later life and death ==
After she retired from performing, Lurlean Tischler served as a trustee on the Covert Township board in Covert, Michigan from 1975 until her death in 1983. She died on March 11, 1983 at Bronson Methodist Hospital in Kalamazoo, Michigan at the age of 63, supposedly after an undisclosed illness. She was interred at Covert Cemetery in Covert, Michigan.

== Discography ==
Albums

- Lonesome Gal (1956, RCA Victor)
- Night Life (1957, Vik Records)
- Stepping Out (1958, Vik Records)
- Blue and Sentimental (1960, Atlantic Records)

Singles

- Palm Chant (with the Bleacher Boys, 1951, Seymour Records)
- Moonlight in Vermont / If I Should Lose You (with The Meadowlarks; backing vocals, 1951, Shellac Records)
- Imagination / There Goes My Heart (1951, Major Records)
- My Home Town, Chicago / I Get a Warm Feeling (1951, Discovery Records)
- My Home Town, Chicago / I Hadn't Anyone Till You (1951, Seymour Records)
- Bye Bye Blackbird (1956, Vik Records)
- You Touched Me / Show Me Love (1957, Vik Records)
- You'd Be So Nice To Come Home To (on the album Melodie Di Harlem with Harry Belafonte and Lena Horne)
- There's a Lull in My Life (1964, Smash Records)
- Oh Well / I'm Sitting On Top Of The World (1964, Smash Records)
- This Much I Know (1956, VIK Records)
