= Dyett =

Dyett is a surname. Notable people with the surname include:

== People ==
- Gilbert Dyett (1891–1964), Australian soldier
- Isidor Dyett (fl. 1862–1863), Chief Magistrate of Anguilla
- Walter Dyett (1901–1969), American violinist and music educator
  - Dyett High School, public arts high school in Chicago, named for the educator
