= Little Miss Cornshucks =

American singer (1923–1999)

- Publicity photo, c1940s

Background information
- Also known as: Mildred Jorman; Lil' Miss Cornshucks
- Born: Mildred Elizabeth Cummings; May 26, 1923; Dayton, Ohio, United States
- Died: November 11, 1999 (aged 76) Indianapolis, Indiana, United States
- Genres: Rhythm and blues, jazz
- Occupation: Singer
- Instrument: Vocals
- Years active: c.1930–1960s
- Labels: Sunbeam, Aladdin, Coral, Chess

Little Miss Cornshucks (or Lil' Miss Cornshucks) was the stage name of Mildred Jorman (born Mildred Elizabeth Cummings; May 26, 1923 – November 11, 1999). She was an American rhythm and blues and jazz singer and songwriter. In her stage show from the 1940s and early 1950s she portrayed herself as a simple farm girl. Her vocal style inspired later R&B and soul singers, among them LaVern Baker, Ruth Brown, Aretha Franklin, Otis Redding, Sam Cooke, Wynona Carr and Billy Wright. Her own career never achieved full recognition in her lifetime.

== Life ==
Cummings was born in Dayton, Ohio. She was the youngest child of a large musical family of African-American origin. Mildred began to sing with her sisters, as the Cummings Sisters, performing spirituals in the Dayton area. By the time she was seven, she was making solo appearances in young people's amateur talent shows.

She developed a stage wardrobe that appealed to black southern agricultural workers who at that time were migrating from the south to the US northern industrial cities. Her stage show was performed barefoot, with a straw hat, braids, backwoods clothes and a basket to evoke memories of the rural south. She would appear uncouth by staring blankly and picking her nose. When her act started she would move into the latest dances and songs sung with a deep feeling coming from bitter experience. This appeal to rural migrants was used by other artists of that era such as LaVern Baker who sang as ''Little Miss Sharecropper''. In US and Canadian English a cornshuck is the husk of an ear of maize.

In 1940, Cummings married Cornelius Jorman, with whom she had three children. Her husband worked as her manager and accompanied her at her performances.

By 1942 she was a star in the Chicago area, performing at the Rhumboogie Club. The band leader and arranger Marl Young who worked at the club recognised her talent and signed her under contract to the then famous Club DeLisa. A year later, the future owner of Atlantic Records, Ahmet Ertegun, heard her sing in Washington, D.C., and wrote in his memoirs:

"1943, I was about 19 years old; I went to a nightclub in the northeast black district of Washington DC and heard a singer named Little Miss Cornshucks and thought: 'Oh God!' She was better than anything I had heard so far. She came across like a country girl, provided with a headscarf and a basket in her hand and so on; but she could sing the blues better than anyone I've heard to date. That night I asked her if I could record a record with her. We then played 'Kansas City' and a few other blues numbers and the song 'So Long'. She had such a wonderful sound and I remember how I always thought, 'Oh my God, and I have no record company; I can make the drive just for myself.'"

"So Long" became her signature tune and a regional hit in 1943 for the short-lived Sunbeam label.

For health reasons, Miss Cornshucks had to interrupt her career in the mid-1940s. She returned to Ohio and there she finally separated from her husband Cornelius, who was involved in the drug trade. She then returned to her native Indianapolis and became increasingly dependent on alcohol.

Her Sunbeam recordings were now republished on the Old Swingmaster label and she enjoyed some success in the Detroit area based at the Frolics Bar. Performances in New York and Washington followed. During one of these tours she met the dancer Henry "Henny" Ramsey, who became her lover and with whom she spent several years on tour while her children stayed with her family in Dayton. Ramsey and Cornshucks lived together for a while in Los Angeles, where she appeared in the clubs of Central Avenue, such as the Last Word Room and Club Alabam.

In 1948 she appeared at the Million Dollar Theater in down-town Los Angeles. This was a converted former cinema. She was billed as "the new look in comedy" and "a rustic comedienne". Her comedic talent gave her a small film role in Campus Sleuth, a 1947 B-movie made by Monogram Pictures, and produced by The Bowery Boys and Charlie Chan. In May 1948, she recorded new songs for the small label Miltone in California under the direction of saxophonist and producer Maxwell Davis. In 1948, she performed alongside Dizzy Gillespie at the fourth famed annual Cavalcade of Jazz concert held at Wrigley Field in Los Angeles which was produced by Leon Hefflin Sr. on September 12. Also on the program that day were Frankie Laine, The Sweethearts of Rhythm, The Honeydrippers, Joe Turner, Jimmy Witherspoon, The Blenders, and The Sensations. The 1950s saw her return to Chicago and she continued to sing in the clubs there while living in Kenosha, Wisconsin.

In late 1960 she came out of semi retirement to record an LP for the Chess label, produced by Sonny Thompson, entitled The Loneliest Gal in Town. Success eluded her and went instead to Aretha Franklin who recorded a single of the LP's soul-style version of "Try A Little Tenderness", and had a hit with it.

Mildred Jorman died at her home in Indianapolis, Indiana, in November 1999, aged 76, after a series of strokes.

== Recording history ==
- Chicago, September 1946: "So Long", "Gonna Leave Here Walkin'" (Cummins), "Have You Ever Loved Somebody"; Sunbeam; Little Miss Cornshucks with Marl Young's Orchestra
- Chicago, October 1946: "For Old Time's Sake", "I Do not Love You Any More", "When Mommy Sings a Lullaby"; Sunbeam; Marl Young Orchestra with Marl Young (p, dir, arr); Melvin Moore (tp); Nick Cooper (tp); Nat Jones (as); Frank Derrick (as); Moses Gant (ts); Wilson Rail (B); Oliver Coleman (d).
- Los Angeles May 1948: "Cornshuck's Blues", "In the Rain"; Miltone/DeLuxe; Little Miss Cornshucks with Maxwell Davis & The Blenders
- Los Angeles May 1948: "He's Funny That Way", Miltone; Little Miss Cornshucks with Calvin Jackson & The Blenders
- Los Angeles May 1948: "True (You Do not Love Me)", "Why Was I Born", Teardrops, Miltone, Little Miss Cornshucks with Maxwell Davis & The Blenders
- Los Angeles, August 12, 1949: "Waiting in Vain", "(Now That I'm Free) You Turned Your Back on Me", "Keep You Hand on Your Heart", "Time After Time"; Aladdin. Little Miss Cornshucks and Her All-Stars; Maxwell Davis (ts)
- Los Angeles, 1951: "Papa Tree Top Blues", "So Long", "Rock Me to Sleep", "Try A Little Tenderness", "Do Not Marry Too Soon", "Cause I Lost My Helping Hand"; Coral; Lil' Miss Cornshucks with Orchestra: Benny Carter, Bumps Meyers, Que Martyn, Charles Waller (sax), Eddie Beal (p) Billy Hadnott (b)
- Chicago, 1961: "No Teasing Around", "It Do Me So Good"; Chess; Studio band (p, g, b, dr), strings
