= Macomba Lounge =

The Macomba Lounge, at 3905 South Cottage Grove, Chicago, was an after-hours music club owned by Leonard Chess from 1946 to October 1950, when it burned down.

Chess had invested the money made from his two liquor stores into refurbishing an old eatery, its liquor license being granted to his brother, Phil, in February 1946, shortly after being discharged from the army. In a seedy neighborhood, and initially a bar patronised by prostitutes and drug dealers, the establishment soon developed a reputation among local musicians as an after-hours club, known for featuring jazz groups playing bebop and jump blues.

The following year, in September 1947, Chess went into the recording business by buying into Aristocrat Records, a recently created local record label, after the tenor sax player Tom Archia, a member of the house trio, was hired by the label’s talent scout, Sammy Goldberg, to record a session led by Armand "Jump" Jackson. Goldberg would sign on several of the club’s performers.

Performers who appeared at the Macomba included King Fleming (January 1947), Andrew Tibbs, Eddie Chamblee, Ike Day, Gene Ammons (February 1949), Claude McLin (two weeks in March 1949), and Forrest Sykes (jam session with Archia on April 11, 1950).

== House bands ==
- Timothy Brown: June 1946
- Charles Hawkins: June 1946 – November 10, 1946
- Wendell Owens trio: November 1946 – May 1947 (with Wendell Owens, piano; Glen Brooks, drums; and Tom Archia, tenor sax)
- Bill Owens trio: October 1947
- Tom Archia trio: Spring 1949 – October 1950 (with LeRoy Jackson, bass; and Wes Landers, drums)

== Biopic ==
Chess was portrayed by Adrien Brody in the biopic about him in the 2008 film Cadillac Records.
