= Sammy Davis, Jr. Sings and Laurindo Almeida Plays =

Studio album by Sammy Davis Jr.
- Released: 1966
- Recorded: June 11 and August 9, 1966
- Studios: United Recordings, Las Vegas
- Genre: Vocal jazz
- Length: 37:03
- Label: Reprise
- Producer: Jimmy Bowen

Sammy Davis Jr. chronology
The Sounds of '66 (1966)	Sammy Davis, Jr. Sings and Laurindo Almeida Plays (1966)	That's All! (1966)

Professional ratings
Review scores
Source	Rating
Allmusic	4/5 stars

Sammy Davis, Jr. Sings and Laurindo Almeida Plays (Note: Titled Sammy Davis, Jr. Sings Laurindo Almeida Plays on the LP front cover and labels, and Sammy Davis, Jr. Sings and Laurindo Almeida Plays and the Results Are Incomparable on the back cover of the LP.) is a 1966 studio album by Sammy Davis Jr., accompanied by guitarist Laurindo Almeida.

== Track listing ==
1. "Here's That Rainy Day" (Johnny Burke, Jimmy Van Heusen) – 2:19
2. "Two Different Worlds" (Al Frisch, Bernie Wayne) – 3:24
3. "The Shadow of Your Smile" (Johnny Mandel, Paul Francis Webster) – 4:18
4. "Where Is Love?" (Lionel Bart) – 3:04
5. "Ev'ry Time We Say Goodbye" (Cole Porter) – 4:08
6. "I'm Always Chasing Rainbows" (Harry Carroll, Joseph McCarthy) – 2:25
7. "We'll Be Together Again" (Carl T. Fischer, Frankie Laine) – 3:18
8. "Joey, Joey, Joey" (Frank Loesser) – 4:23
9. "The Folks Who Live On the Hill" (Oscar Hammerstein II, Jerome Kern) – 3:50
10. "Speak Low" (Ogden Nash, Kurt Weill) – 3:35

Bonus track on 1991 CD reissue:

11. "Misty" (Johnny Burke, Erroll Garner) - 2:19

== Personnel ==
- Sammy Davis Jr. – vocals
- Laurindo Almeida – guitar
- George Rhodes – conductor, arranger
