= Rozelle Claxton =

American jazz musician (1913–1995)

- Born: February 5, 1913; Bartlett, Tennessee, U.S.
- Died: March 30, 1995 (aged 82) Lake Forest, Illinois, U.S.
- Genres: Jazz
- Occupations: Pianist, arranger
- Instrument: Piano

Rozelle Claxton (February 5, 1913, Bartlett, Tennessee – March 30, 1995, Lake Forest, Illinois) was an American jazz pianist and arranger.

Claxton learned the piano at the age of 11 and started playing professionally with Clarence Davis by the age of 17, whose band was working with W.C. Handy. He played and arranged for Harlan Leonard and played solo in Chicago in the 1930s. Following this he played with Ernie Fields and Eddie South, and had a short stint as a substitute pianist in Count Basie's orchestra. Later in the 1940s he played with Walter Fuller, George Dixon, Earl Hines, Red Norvo, Jimmie Lunceford, and Andy Kirk. In the 1950s he did much work accompanying vocalists, including Pearl Bailey. He worked with Franz Jackson from 1959 well into the 1960s, in addition to continuing solo appearances in Chicago as an organist and pianist.
