= Soulful Saxophone =

Compilation album by Gene Ammons
- Released: 1959
- Recorded: October 12, 1948, February 28, 1949, January 8, 1950, May 2, 1950, August, 1950 and May 3, 1951
- Studio: Chicago, Illinois
- Genre: Jazz
- Length: 27:52
- Label: Chess; LP 1442

Gene Ammons chronology
Jug Sessions (1947–49)	Soulful Saxophone (1959)	Jug and Sonny (1959)

Soulful Saxophone is an album by saxophonist Gene Ammons, compiling tracks recorded between 1948 and 1951, some of which were originally released as singles, that was issued by the Chess label in 1959.

== Reception ==
Professional ratings
Review scores
Source	Rating
AllMusic	3/5 stars
DownBeat	1.5/5 stars

The AllMusic review stated: "This compilation is taken from five of Ammon's sessions".

== Track listing ==
1. "My Foolish Heart" (Victor Young, Ned Washington) – 2:42
2. "Prelude to a Kiss" (Duke Ellington, Irving Gordon, Irving Mills) – 2:55
3. "It's You or No One" (Jule Styne, Sammy Cahn) – 2:40
4. "Can Anyone Explain" (Bennie Benjamin, George David Weiss) – 2:48
5. "Goodbye" (Gordon Jenkins) – 3:05
6. "Pennies from Heaven" (Arthur Johnston, Johnny Burke) – 2:30
7. "Happiness Is a Thing Called Joe" (Harold Arlen, Yip Harburg) – 2:38
8. "You Go to My Head" (J. Fred Coots, Haven Gillespie) – 2:45
9. "Once in a While" (Michael Edwards, Bud Green) – 3:05
10. "It's the Talk of the Town" (Jerry Livingston, Al J. Neiburg, Marty Symes) – 2:44
- Recorded in Chicago on October 12, 1948 (track 10), February 28, 1949 (track 9), January 8, 1950 (track 6), May 2, 1950 (tracks 1, 3 & 8). August, 1950 (tracks 2 & 4) and May 3, 1951 (tracks 5 & 7)

== Personnel ==
- Gene Ammons – tenor saxophone
- Bill Massey (tracks 1–4 & 8), Jesse Miller (track 6) – trumpet
- Matthew Gee – trombone (tracks 1–4, 6 & 8)
- Tom Archia – tenor saxophone (track 10)
- Sonny Stitt – baritone saxophone (tracks 2 & 4)
- Charlie Bateman (tracks 1–4 & 8), Junior Mance (track 5–7) – piano
- Christine Chatman – piano, vocals (tracks 9 & 10)
- Leo Blevins – guitar (tracks 6 & 9)
- Leroy Jackson (tracks 6 & 10), Lowell Pointer (track 9), Gene Wright (tracks 1–5, 7 & 8) – bass
- Ike Day (track 9), Wesley Landers (tracks 1–4, 6, 8 & 10), Teddy Stewart (tracks 5 & 7) – drums
- Mary Graham – vocals (track 9)
