= Alvin Burroughs =

American jazz musician

- Birth name: Alvin Burroughs
- Born: 1911; Mobile, AL
- Died: August 1, 1950 (aged 38)
- Genres: Jazz
- Occupation: Musician
- Instrument: Drums

Alvin Burroughs (November 21, 1911 – August 1, 1950) was an American swing jazz drummer.

Burroughs played in Kansas City with Walter Page's Blue Devils in 1928–29 and then with Alphonse Trent's territory band in 1930.

Moving to Chicago, he played with Hal Draper's Arcadians (1935), Horace Henderson (July 1937–38), and Earl Hines (September 1938–40); with Hines he recorded extensively. In the early 1940s he worked with Milt Larkin's band at the Rhumboogie Club, Benny Carter (late 1942), and Red Allen (late 1944–April 46), in addition to leading his own band. He was in George Dixon's quartet in 1950 when he died of a heart attack. He never recorded as a leader.

== Bibliography ==
- Scott Yanow, https://www.allmusic.com/artist/p61148/biography Alvin Burroughs] at Allmusic
