= Joe Bridgewater =

American R&B trumpeter

- Genres: Soul, R&B
- Occupation(s): Musician, songwriter, record producer
- Instrument: Trumpet

Joe Bridgewater was an American R&B trumpeter who recorded often with Ray Charles.

In Houston in 1973, he played in the Sonny Franklin Big Band with Tom Archia, Arnett Cobb, Cedric Haywood and his bandmate from the Ray Charles band, Don Wilkerson, with guest appearances by Eddie "Cleanhead" Vinson and Clarence "Gatemouth" Brown.
