= Scotty Scott =

Scotty Scott may refer to:

- Montgomery Scott, a Star Trek character, most recognizable for his role in the misquoted phrase "Beam me up, Scotty"
- Harold "Scotty" Scott, American soul singer and member of the Temprees
- Kermit Scott (musician), American jazz saxophonist
- Wallace "Scotty" Scott, American rhythm and blues singer and member of the Whispers
