= Tom Archia =

American jazz tenor saxophonist (1919–1977)

- Birth name: Ernest Alvin Archia, Jr.
- Also known as: Texas Tom
- Born: November 26, 1919; Groveton, Texas, U.S.
- Died: January 16, 1977 (aged 57); Houston, Texas, U.S.
- Genres: Jazz
- Instruments: Tenor saxophone

Ernest Alvin Archia, Jr. (November 26, 1919 – January 16, 1977) known as Tom Archia, was an American jazz tenor saxophonist.

== Early life ==
Archia was born in Groveton, Texas, moving with his family as a child to Rockdale and then Baytown, near Houston. He played saxophone in the Wheatley High School orchestra. He was known in childhood as "Sonny", but took the name "Tom" when he decided that neither "Ernest" nor "Alvin" were appropriate for a musician.

== Career ==
After graduating from Prairie View A&M University in 1939, he joined Milt Larkin's band which, at the time, according to Down Beat, also included Eddie Vinson, Arnett Cobb, and Illinois Jacquet in the reed section and Cedric Haywood as pianist and arranger. Archia arrived in Chicago as a member of Larkin's band, which took up a nine-month residency backing T-Bone Walker at the Rhumboogie Club from August 1942 to May 1943.

In November 1943, he was a member of the Roy Eldridge orchestra that recorded in Chicago for the Brunswick label. Other band members included Ike Quebec, Ted Sturgis, and Doc West. He moved to the Rhumboogie "Dream Band," which lasted from November 1943 to June 1944. Along with Charlie Parker, Archia frequently disrupted band discipline, so when Marl Young took over as bandleader, his first act was to fire Archia.

In 1945, Archia went to Los Angeles to join Howard McGhee's combo, with Teddy Edwards, among others. Shortly afterwards, he was recording with the Jacquet brothers, Illinois and Russell, as well as Helen Humes.

Returning to Chicago in 1946, he became a headliner at Leonard Chess's club, the Macomba Lounge, and recorded extensively for Aristocrat Records, the predecessor to Chess Records, during 1947 and 1948. He also recorded with Wynonie Harris and Hot Lips Page (on King Records).

He frequently participated in tenor saxophone duels with Buster Bennett, Gene Ammons, Claude McLin, and Hal Singer, among others. His run at the Macomba ended when the club was closed by a fire in 1950. Although Tom Archia worked steadily on the South Side of Chicago during the 1950s, and added Harold Ashby, Porter Kilbert and Lucius Washington to his roster of duelling partners, his recording opportunities were sparse and unheralded but included two sessions accompanying Dinah Washington. His last recording session was a blues jam organized by Armand "Jump" Jackson in 1960 for visiting German critic Joachim-Ernst Berendt, who was touring the United States doing research on jazz history.

Archia struggled to find gigs in the 1960s. He retired to Houston in 1967, after being temporarily disabled by a broken jaw. After recovering, he played Houston clubs for the rest of his life. He worked with Arnett Cobb in the Sonny Franklin Big Band, which also included Joe Bridgewater and Don Wilkerson, with guest appearances by Clarence "Gatemouth" Brown and another old Larkin bandmate, Eddie "Cleanhead" Vinson. Many of the band's arrangements were by another Larkin alumnus, Cedric Haywood.

== Personal life ==
Archia died in 1977, aged 57, and was commemorated with a jazz funeral in Houston's Fifth Ward.

== Discography ==
- Gene Ammons, Soulful Saxophone (Chess, 1959)
- Gene Ammons/Sonny Stitt, Jug and Sonny (Chess, 1960)
- The Chronological Illinois Jacquet 1945–1946 (Classics 'Chronological' series, 1997)
- The Chronological Roy Eldridge 1945–1947 (Classics 'Chronological' series, 1998)
- The Chronological Helen Humes 1945–1947 (Classics 'Chronological' series, 1998)
- Hot Lips Page, Shoutin' the Blues (December 1947) (Blue Boar [Fr] Records, 1999)
- The Chronological Wynonie Harris 1947–1949 (Classics 'Chronological' series, 2000)
- The Chronological Marion Abernathy 1947–1949 (Classics 'Blues & Rhythm' series, 2001)
- The Chronological Tom Archia 1947–1948 (Classics 'Blues & Rhythm' series, 2001)
- The Chronological Andrew Tibbs 1947–1951 (Classics 'Blues & Rhythm' series, 2002)
