= Jug and Sonny =

Compilation album by Gene Ammons and Sonny Stitt
- Released: 1960
- Recorded: October 12, 1948, February 28, 1949, January 8, 1950, May 2, 1950, August, 1950 and May 3, 1951
- Studio: Chicago, Illinois
- Genre: Jazz
- Length: 27:52
- Label: Chess; LP 1445

Gene Ammons chronology
Soulful Saxophone (1959)	Jug and Sonny (1960)	The Golden Saxophone of Gene Ammons (1959)

Jug and Sonny is a compilation album by saxophonist Gene Ammons, with Sonny Stitt featured on two tracks, collecting recordings made between 1948 and 1951, some of which were originally released as singles, that was issued by the Chess label in 1960.

Professional ratings
Review scores
Source	Rating
AllMusic	4/5 stars

== Track listing ==
All compositions by Gene Ammons except where noted:

1. "I'm Not the Kind of a Guy" (as "You're Not the Kind of a Girl") (Will Hudson) – 2:40
2. "I Cover the Waterfront" (Johnny Green, Edward Heyman) – 2:37
3. "Full Moon" – 2:40
4. "Jam for Boppers" – 5:03
5. "Don't Do Me Wrong" (Jimmy Mundy) – 2:47
6. "Don't Worry 'bout Me" (Rube Bloom, Ted Koehler) – 2:40
7. "Baby, Won't You Please Say Yes" (John Henry Burton as John Burton) – 2:44
8. "Cha Bootie" (Jimmy Mundy) – 2:47
9. "Tenor Eleven" – 2:50
10. "The Last Chance" (as "The Last Mile") – 2:44
- Recorded in Chicago on October 12, 1948 (track 4), January 8, 1950 (tracks 3, 8, 10), May 2, 1950 (track 9), August, 1950 (track 5) and May 3, 1951 (tracks 1, 2, 6, 7)

== Personnel ==
- Gene Ammons – tenor saxophone (tracks 1, 3 to 5, 7 to 10)
- Sonny Stitt – tenor saxophone (tracks 2, 6), baritone saxophone (track 5)
- Bill Massey (tracks 5, 9), Jesse Miller (tracks 3, 8, 10) – trumpet
- Matthew Gee – trombone (tracks 3, 5, 8 to 10)
- Tom Archia – tenor saxophone (track 4)
- Charlie Bateman (tracks 5, 9), Junior Mance (tracks 1, 3, 7, 8, 10 and probably 2, 6) – piano
- Christine Chatman – piano (track 4)
- Leo Blevins – guitar (tracks 3, 8, 10)
- Leroy Jackson (tracks 3, 4, 8, 10), Gene Wright (tracks 1, 2, 5 to 7, 9) – bass
- Wesley Landers (tracks 3 to 5, 8 to 10), Teddy Stewart (tracks 1, 2, 6, 7) – drums
