= Matthew Gee =

American jazz musician (1925–1979)

Matthew Gee (November 25, 1925 in Houston, Texas – July 18, 1979 in New York City) was an American bebop trombonist.

Gee played trumpet and baritone as a child, and took up the trombone at age 11. After studying at Alabama State University, he played with Coleman Hawkins before doing a stint in the Army. Following this, he played with Dizzy Gillespie (1946–1949), Joe Morris, Gene Ammons and Sonny Stitt (1950), Count Basie (1951), Illinois Jacquet (1952–1954), Lou Donaldson (1954), Sarah Vaughan (1956), and Gillespie again in 1957. In 1956 he released his only record as a bandleader on Riverside Records. From 1959 to 1963 he played on and off with the Duke Ellington Orchestra. Later in the 1960s, he played in small groups with Paul Quinichette and Brooks Kerr, as well as in big bands with Sonny Stitt and Johnny Griffin.

== Discography ==
=== As leader ===
- Jazz by Gee (Riverside, 1956)
- Soul Groove (Atlantic, 1963) - with Johnny Griffin

=== As sideman ===
With Gene Ammons

- Soulful Saxophone (Chess, 1948-50 [1959])
- Jug and Sonny (Chess, 1948–51, [1960])
- The Gene Ammons Story: The 78 Era (Prestige, 1950–55)

With Count Basie

- Basie in London (Verve, 1956)

With Ray Bryant

- Dancing the Big Twist (Columbia, 1961)

With Lou Donaldson

- Quartet/Quintet/Sextet (Blue Note, 1952–54)

With Duke Ellington

- Blues in Orbit (Columbia, 1958–59)
- Swinging Suites by Edward E. and Edward G. (1960)

With Dizzy Gillespie

- Jazz Recital (Norgran, 1955)

With Tony Graye

- Oh, Gee! (Zim, 1975)

With Johnny Griffin

- The Big Soul-Band (Prestige, 1960)

With Coleman Hawkins

- Body And Soul Revisited (GRP, 1951–58)

With Erskine Hawkins

- 1946-1947 (Classics)

With Illinois Jacquet

- Groovin' with Jacquet (Clef, 1951-53 [1956])
- The Kid and the Brute (Clef, 1955)
- The Soul Explosion (Prestige, 1969)

With Sonny Stitt

- Stitt's Bits (Prestige, 1950 [1958])
- Kaleidoscope (Prestige, 1950 [1957])
- Sonny Stitt & the Top Brass (Atlantic, 1962)
