= That's All! =

Live album by Sammy Davis Jr.
- Released: 1967
- Recorded: December 1966
- Genre: Vocal jazz
- Length: 104:15
- Label: Reprise
- Producer: Jimmy Bowen

Sammy Davis Jr. chronology
Sammy Davis Jr. Sings and Laurindo Almeida Plays (1966)	That's All! (1967)	Sammy Davis Jr. Sings the Complete "Dr. Dolittle" (1967)

Professional ratings
Review scores
Source	Rating
Allmusic	4/5 stars

That's All! is a 1967 live album by Sammy Davis Jr., released and recorded by Reprise Records at the Sands Hotel on the Las Vegas Strip. That's All! was recorded in 1966 by Reprise Records producer Jimmy Bowen, and engineer Eddie Brackett. The record is a collection of songs and routines from a six show run Davis did at the Sands.

This run at the Sands took place shortly after Davis finished his two year run with the Broadway musical Golden Boy by Charles Strouse, which caused Davis to take a break from entertaining in night clubs. The significance of That's All! compared to Davis' other entries is highlighted in Gary Fishgall's book Gonna Do Great Things. "With the jokes, the soaring musical numbers, and the surprise bits here and there, Sammy Davis Jr.: That's All! perfectly captured and preserved that moment in time when the entertainer was relishing his return to the nightclub circuit and was at the very top of his game."

== Track listing ==
1. "Ain't I" (George Rhodes) – 1:02
2. "With a Song in My Heart" (Lorenz Hart, Richard Rodgers) – 2:05
3. "Another Spring" (Robin Beaumont, Leslie Bricusse) – 2:57
4. "Any Place I Hang My Hat Is Home" (Harold Arlen, Johnny Mercer) – 4:14
5. Comedy Monologue by Sammy Davis, Jr. – 9:52
6. Medley – 10:43
  - "I've Got You Under My Skin" (Cole Porter)
  - "What's a Nice Kid Like You Doing In a Place Like This?" (Bill Dana)
  - "Dang Me" (Roger Miller)
  - "Big Bad John" (Dean Acuff, Roy Acuff)
  - "The Girl From Ipanema" (Vinicius de Moraes, Norman Gimbel, Antonio Carlos Jobim)
  - "Ugly Chilie" (Mercer)
  - "On the Road to Mandalay" (Oley Speaks, Rudyard Kipling)
  - "What'd I Say" (Ray Charles)
  - "Hello Dolly!" (Jerry Herman)
  - "I've Got You Under My Skin" (Porter)
7. "The Lady is a Tramp" (Hart, Rodgers) – 4:37
8. Medley – 6:48
  - "The Lonesome Road" (Gene Austin, Nathaniel Shilkret)
  - "Gonna Build a Mountain" (Anthony Newley, Leslie Bricusse)
  - "Yes I Can" (Lee Adams, Charles Strouse)
  - "I Want to Be with You" (Adams, Strouse)
  - "Too Close for Comfort" (Jerry Bock, George David Weiss, Larry Holofcener)
  - "Something's Gotta Give" (Mercer)
  - "Hey There" (Richard Adler, Jerry Ross)
9. "My Mother the Car" (Paul Hampton) – 2:23
10. "On a Clear Day You Can See Forever" (Burton Lane, Alan Jay Lerner) – 2:45
11. "The Birth of the Blues" (Lew Brown, Buddy DeSylva, Ray Henderson) – 4:13
12. "As Long as She Needs Me" (Lionel Bart) – 2:31
13. "Bye Bye Blackbird" (Mort Dixon, Henderson) – 3:14
14. "One for My Baby (and One More for the Road)" (Arlen, Mercer) – 10:20
15. "Where or When" (Hart, Rodgers) – 3:15
16. "Chicago" (Fred Fisher) – 2:44
17. "You're Nobody till Somebody Loves You" (James Cavanaugh, Russ Morgan, Larry Stock) – 3:23
18. "Without a Song" (Edward Eliscu, Billy Rose, Vincent Youmans) – 3:43
19. "What Kind of Fool Am I?" (Bricusse, Newley) – 3:11
20. "Let's Keep Swinging" (Rhodes) – 8:11
21. "Sweet Beginning" (Bricusse, Newley) – 1:42

== Personnel ==
Recorded in December 1966, The Copa Room at the Sands Hotel, Las Vegas:

- Sammy Davis Jr.: vocals
- Buddy Rich: drums (track 21)
- Michael Silva: drums
- George Rhodes: conductor, arranger, piano
- John Derose: guitar
- Renauld Jones Jr.: trumpet
- Aaron Bell: bass
- Benny Powell: trombone

== Bibliography/References ==
- Fishgall, Gary. Gonna Do Great Things: The Life of Sammy Davis, Jr.. Scribner, 2014.
- Tiegel, Eliot. Liner notes. “Thats All!”. Reprise records, 1967, vinyl.

Specific
