= What It's All About (Roy Eldridge album) =

Studio album by Roy Eldridge
- Released: 1976
- Recorded: January 16, 1976
- Studios: RCA Recording Studios, New York, NY
- Genre: Jazz
- Length: 42:05
- Labels: Pablo; 2310 766
- Producer: Norman Granz

Roy Eldridge chronology
Decidedly (1975)	What It's All About (1976)	Roy Eldridge 4 – Montreux '77 (1977)

What It's All About is an album by trumpeter Roy Eldridge recorded in 1976 and released by the Pablo label.

== Reception ==
Professional ratings
Review scores
Source	Rating
AllMusic	4/5 stars
The Penguin Guide to Jazz Recordings	3/4 stars

AllMusic reviewer Scott Yanow stated "What It's All About is swinging, building up solos to potentially ferocious levels and going for broke. That was always the philosophy that Roy Eldridge followed and, even though it was rather late in his career by the time he recorded this Pablo set, he was still pushing himself".

== Track listing ==
All compositions by Roy Eldridge except where noted

1. "I Still Love Him So" (Benny Carter) – 6:12
2. "The Heat's On" – 6:43
3. "That Thing" – 8:19
4. "Recado Bossa Nova" (Luiz Antônio, Djalma Ferreira, Paul Francis Webster) – 6:40
5. "Melange" – 13:10

== Personnel ==
- Roy Eldridge – trumpet
- Norris Turney – alto saxophone
- Budd Johnson – tenor saxophone
- Milt Jackson – vibraphone (tracks 4 & 5)
- Norman Simmons – piano
- Ted Sturgis – bass
- Eddie Locke – drums
