= Andrew Tibbs =

American urban blues singer (1929–1991)

- Born: Melvin Andrew Grayson; February 2, 1929; Columbus, Ohio, United States
- Died: May 5, 1991 (aged 62); Chicago, Illinois, United States
- Genres: Electric blues, urban blues
- Occupations: Singer, songwriter
- Instrument: Vocals
- Years active: Late 1940s–1991
- Label: Various

Andrew Tibbs (February 2, 1929 – May 5, 1991) was an American electric and urban blues singer and songwriter. He is best known for his controversial 1947 recording "Bilbo Is Dead", a song relating to the demise of Theodore G. Bilbo.

== Biography ==
Tibbs was born Melvin Andrew Grayson, in Columbus, Ohio. As a boy he sang in Baptist choirs in Chicago, directed by Mahalia Jackson and Dinah Washington. He was influenced by Ivory Joe Hunter and Arnold "Gatemouth" Moore.

From 1947 to 1949, Tibbs recorded for Aristocrat Records. His debut single was "Bilbo Is Dead" backed with "Union Man Blues", recorded when he was eighteen years old. The tracks were both co-written by Tibbs and Tom Archia, and caused controversy. The A-side criticized Theodore Bilbo's policies, whilst the B-side caused displeasure from the Chicago-based teamster's union. Six further singles were released by Aristocrat. Following its eventual acquisition by Leonard and Phil Chess, the newly formed Chess Records signed a recording contract with Tibbs in 1950, but he released only one record, "You Can't Win", before being dismissed.

Tibbs recorded the single "Rock Savoy Rock" for Peacock Records in 1951, followed by some unissued sessions for Savoy. With his brother, Kenneth, Tibbs recorded one session for Atco in 1956, which featured King Curtis. His final recordings, in 1962 for M-Pac Records, included his last single release, "Stone Hearted Woman".

He worked for West Electric thereafter and gave sporadic live performances in Chicago clubs.

Tibbs died in Chicago in May 1991, aged 62.

== Discography ==
- 1947–1951 (1991), Classics Records
