= Leroy Harris Jr. =

American jazz musician

LeRoy Watts Harris
- Born: February 12, 1916; St. Louis, Missouri, U.S.
- Died: February 16, 2005 (aged 89); St. Louis, Missouri, U.S.
- Genres: Jazz
- Instruments: Clarinet

LeRoy Watts Harris Jr. (February 12, 1916 – February 16, 2005) was an American jazz reedist. He was the son of Leroy Harris Sr., and his uncle was Arville Harris.

== Early life ==
Harris was born and raised in St. Louis. He began playing violin when he was young, then learned saxophone and clarinet. By age 13, he was playing with pianist Chick Finney.

== Career ==
Harris relocated to Chicago around 1930, and played with Ray Nance from 1931 to 1936; following this he worked with Earl Hines from 1937 to 1943. He joined the United States Navy during World War II and played in a band from 1943 to 1944. After his discharge, he played with Bill Doggett, Ben Thigpen, Tadd Dameron, Sarah Vaughan, Singleton Palmer, and Wynonie Harris, then played with Hines once more. In the early-1950s he led his own band at the Kit Kat Club in New York. He resettled in St. Louis again in 1957 and played with Eddie Johnson from 1960 to 1971.
