= Club DeLisa =

African-American nightclub and music venue in Chicago, Illinois

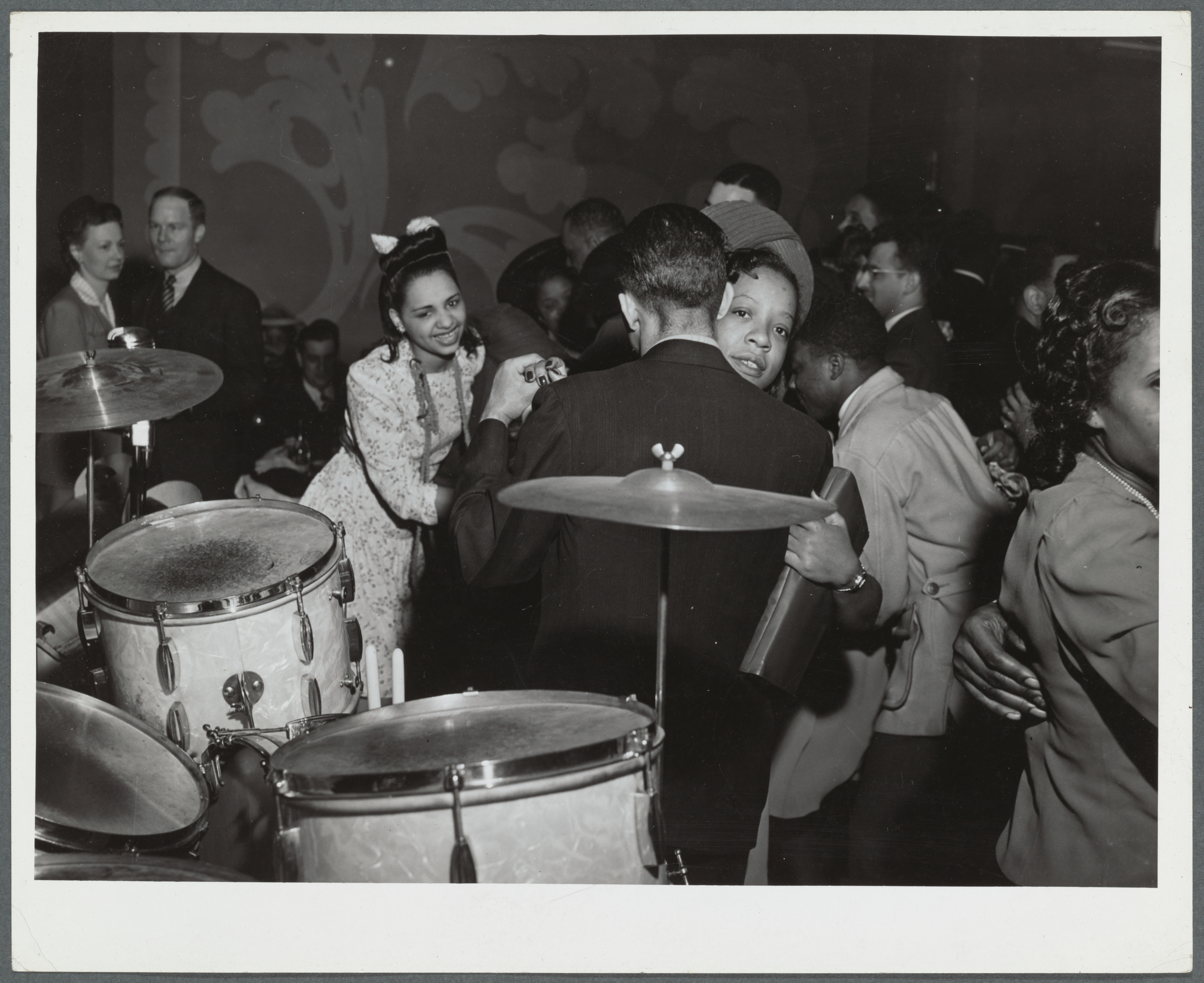
- Dancing to the music of "Red" Saunders and his band at the Club DeLisa, Chicago 1942.
- Interactive map of Club DeLisa
- Location: 5512 - 5516 South State Street; Chicago, Illinois, United States
- Coordinates: 41.7943°N 87.6257°W
- Capacity: 800 seats
- Type: Nightclub
- Events: Blues; Jazz; Bebop; R&B; Soul

Construction
- Opened: circa 1933; 93 years ago
- Closed: February 16, 1958; 68 years ago

The Club DeLisa, also written Delisa or De Lisa, was an African-American nightclub and music venue in Chicago. Located at 5521 South State Street (State Street and Garfield Avenue, on the South Side), it was possibly the most prestigious venue in the city. Together with the Regal Theater and the Rhumboogie Café, the 800–seat Club DeLisa played a key role in the city's association with jazz, blues, rhythm and blues and soul music. It closed in February 1958, but was re-opened as The Club in 1966.

== History ==
The Club DeLisa was owned by the four DeLisa brothers, Louis, John, Jimmy and Mike. It opened in 1934 following the repeal of prohibition. In 1941, the original building burned down but was soon replaced with the New Club DeLisa, which was a larger space. Nightly "revue-style entertainment" at the club was presented in a variety show format. The show featured singers, comedians, dancers, and the DeLisa chorines, accompanied by a house band that ranged in size from 7 to 12 pieces, depending on the club's revenues. Another less heralded source of revenue was gambling, in the club's basement. During its heyday in the 1930s and 1940s, the club would remain open 24 hours a day, offering round-the-clock entertainment with musicians, dancers and vaudeville acts.

Among the musicians and performers associated with the venue over the years were Red Saunders, whose band was in residence from 1937 until 1945 and later returned in 1947. The band stayed until the club closed in 1958, Fletcher Henderson, Count Basie, Sun Ra, Johnny Pate, Joe Williams, LaVaughn Robinson, George Kirby, Sonny Cohn, Earl Washington, Leon Washington, Albert Ammons, LaVern Baker, and Gatemouth Moore (1946–1947 and 1948–1949). The Club DeLisa closed its doors on February 16, 1958, after the deaths of two of the DeLisa brothers. The closing of the club was commemorated in the February 6, 1958 issue of Chicago-based Jet magazine, stating the club would close on February 16 of that year. The magazine has Saunders quoted saying "I haven't had a vacation since 1952. I guess I'll take one now."

== House bands ==
- Red Saunders - 1937–1945; 1947–1958
- Jesse Miller - June 1945–February 1946
- Fletcher Henderson - February 1946

== The Club ==
When DJs E. Rodney Jones and Pervis Spann re-opened the venue under the new name. The first performance at The Club was B.B. King on February 2, 1966.
