= Incendiary Blonde =

1945 film by George Marshall

- Theatrical release poster
- Directed by: George Marshall
- Written by: Ken Englund; James Edward Grant
- Screenplay by: Claude Binyon; Frank Butler
- Produced by: Joseph Sistrom
- Starring: Betty Hutton; Arturo de Córdova; Charles Ruggles; Barry Fitzgerald; Albert Dekker
- Cinematography: Ray Rennahan
- Edited by: Archie Marshek
- Music by: Robert Emmett Dolan; John Leipold
- Production company: Paramount Pictures
- Distributed by: Paramount Pictures
- Release dates: July 25, 1945 (New York City); August 31, 1945 (United States)
- Running time: 113 minutes
- Country: United States
- Language: English

Incendiary Blonde is a 1945 American Technicolor musical drama film directed by George Marshall. Produced and released by Paramount Pictures, the film stars Betty Hutton, and Arturo de Córdova, with Charles Ruggles, Barry Fitzgerald, Albert Dekker, Mary Philips, Bill Goodwin, Eduardo Ciannelli and Maurice Rocco, in his film debut.

The film is loosely based on the life and career of actress, producer, entrepreneur and nightclub hostess Texas Guinan, who was dubbed during the prohibition era as "The Queen of the Nightclubs". Hutton stars as Guinan and de Córdova as her fictional lover.

The film's title is a play on incendiary bombs that were being used during World War II. The score was written by Robert Emmett Dolan, and was nominated for an Academy Award for "Best Music, Scoring of a Musical Picture."

== Plot ==
At the funeral of Texas Guinan, her father Michael "Mike" Guinan laments to friend Tim Callahan the day Texas met her lover, Bill Romero Kilgannon.

In rural Texas, 1909, Tomboy Texas Guinan and her family attend Cherokee Jim’s Wild West Show. Cherokee Jim offers any audience member $50 if they can ride a bucking bronco. Texas sneaks away and takes part in the competition. In the audience, Bill Romero Kilgannon, the owner of the Wild West Show, bets $1,500 on Texas. Texas wins and Bill invites her to join the Wild West Show.

Mike Guinan reveals he has taken out several loans to buy potato fields. That night, Mike discovers the temperature has rapidly dropped, leaving his potato farms useless. Against the wishes of her family, Texas runs away to join the Wild West Show to get money for her penniless family.

Texas becomes a massive success for the show and rises to the top billing. Texas falls for Bill and confesses her love to him, however, he reveals he’s already married. The show’s press manager, Tim Callahan, convinces a heartbroken Texas to go to Broadway with him.

On Broadway, Texas steadily rises through the billings until she gets her own show. After her show, Texas is approached by Cherokee Jim, who is now a Hollywood director. He informs Texas that Bill has also entered the picture business and that his wife has been in a sanatorium for years. Texas leaves Broadway to return to Bill.

Texas travels to Hollywood to reunite with Bill, after they kiss, Bill gets her cast in a movie, with Texas becoming an instant star. Together, Bill, Mike and Texas own stocks in the picture company. Mike accidentally gets mixed up in shady stock dealings. Subsequently, he, Mike and Texas are given subpoenas. Bill also discovers his wife has passed. To save Texas’s career and to prevent her from going to jail, Bill forces her and Mike to sell their stocks to him. Texas, unaware of the subpoena, assumes Bill never loved her and was using her for money. Outraged, Texas leaves him. As Bill prepares to flee the country, he’s convinced by bootlegger Joe Cadden to be his partner in New York City.

Texas returns to Broadway, but is unable to find a job. Texas, to help herself and Nick the Greek’s struggling nightclub, uses her influence to host a party for Louella Parsons. This brings celebrity patrons to Nick's. The plan is a success, with Texas regaining her previous fame. Joe Cadden forces Nick to sell the club. Texas demands Cadden pay her $3,000 a week, which Cadden reluctantly agrees to. Upon learning that Bill works for Cadden, Texas refuses to have anything to do with him.

Rival bootleggers, the Vettori Brothers, send a hitman to murder Texas. Texas survives, thanks to Bill, and Mike reveals that Bill forcibly bought her stocks to save her career. Texas and Bill repair their relationship. The Vettori Brothers assassinate Cadden and attempt to intimidate Bill and Texas into selling the nightclub, but they refuse.

After an x-ray, Texas discovers that a heart problem leaves her with two years to live. Texas rushes to get married, deliberately avoiding telling Bill about her condition. The night before she and Bill are to be married, the Vettori Brothers ambush Bill but he kills them both. Bill is charged with murdering the Vitteori brothers, instead of in self defense. He refuses to marry Texas until he has served his time in prison, a minimum of five years. Texas, realising she’ll die before he gets out, mourns her life.

== Cast ==
- Betty Hutton as Texas Guinan
- Arturo de Córdova as Bill Romero Kilgannon
- Charlie Ruggles as Cherokee Jim
- Albert Dekker as Joe Cadden
- Barry Fitzgerald as Michael "Mike" Guinan
- Mary Philips as Bessie Guinan
- Bill Goodwin as Tim Callahan
- Eduardo Ciannelli as Nick the Greek
- The Maxellos as Acrobats
- Maurice Rocco as himself (waiter/pianist)
- Ray Walker as Gus – Stage Manager (uncredited)
- Catherine Craig as Louella Parsons (uncredited)
- Johnnie Johnston as Singer (uncredited)
- Fred Kelsey as Rancher (uncredited)
- Francis Ford as Rancher (uncredited)
- Erville Alderson as Rancher (uncredited)
- Pat West as Rancher (uncredited)
- Jane Jones as Singer (uncredited)

Cast notes

- This was the final film for character actor Bud Jamison. Jamison, best known for his work with slapstick comedy team The Three Stooges (Disorder in the Court), died suddenly in September 1944. Jamison played the Head bartender, however, he did not receive credit for his work.

== Soundtrack ==
The film features the following songs, many of which were popular in the 1910s and 1920s when most of the film is set.

- "Ragtime Cowboy Joe" — (Music by Lewis F. Muir and Maurice Abrahams, lyrics by Grant Clarke) Performed by Betty Hutton
- "What Do You Want to Make Those Eyes at Me For?" — (Music and lyrics by Joseph McCarthy, Howard Johnson and James V. Monaco) Performed by Betty Hutton and Johnnie Johnston
- "It Had to Be You" — (Music by Isham Jones and lyrics by Gus Kahn) Performed by Betty Hutton
- "Oh By Jingo!" — (Music by Albert Von Tilzer and lyrics by Lew Brown) Performed by Betty Hutton and Chorus
- "Row, Row, Row" — (Music by James V. Monaco and lyrics by William Jerome) Performed by Betty Hutton
- "Darktown Strutters' Ball" — (Music and lyrics by Shelton Brooks) Performed by Maurice Rocco
- "Ida" — (Music and lyrics by Eddie Leonard) Performed by Jane Jones
- "Sweet Genevieve" — (Music by Harry Tucker and lyrics by George Cooper) Performed by Barry Fitzgerald, Fred Kelsey, Francis Ford, Erville Alderson and Pat West

== Production ==
The film was announced in 1942 and was to have co-starred Hutton and Alan Ladd. Ladd withdrew after he enlisted in the army in January, 1943. The film's production was halted while a new male lead was sought and Hutton was reassigned to Let's Face It (1943) with Bob Hope.

Barry Sullivan was named as the male lead after Ladd's withdrawal, but he was assigned to another film and also withdrew. In September, 1943, Brian Donlevy was offered the male lead but refused. Paramount subsequently suspended Donlevy's contract as a result of his refusal to star in Incendiary Blonde.

Production on the film was slated to begin in September, 1943. The film was originally meant to be filmed in black and white, but Paramount increased the budget of the film so that it could be produced in Technicolour. In November, 1943, production commenced on Incendiary Blonde and continued until March, 1944. Hutton broke three ribs while filming the circus scene with the acrobatic trio the Maxellos. Paramount spent $250,000 on marketing for Incendiary Blonde.

== Release and reception ==
The film premiered at the Paramount Theatre in New York City on July 25, 1945 with a stage show headed by Phil Spitalny and his all female orchestra.

The New York Times gave a positive review, writing: "The lusty prohibition era in New York, during a decade of which Texas Guinan presided as Night Club Queen, is fitfully recreated and with an elegance that is more imaginative than historical, in "Incendiary Blonde," which opened yesterday at the Paramount. As a biography of the blonde bombshell from the Lone Star State, the picture recounts a story of heartache and success that probably will strike most movie-goers as a tale twice told, to say the least. But for all that, "Incendiary Blonde" is a sprightly and entertaining show for most of its nearly two hours running time."

Variety Magazine wrote that: "Incendiary Blonde is a sound musical drama based on the life of Broadway's Texas Guinan. Colorful incidents in the "hello sucker" girl's career lend themselves to film treatment, and added value of Techincolor, music, marquee strength indicate healthy business in all situations. Screen story is packed with so much color, music, comedy and drama that its tragedy never becomes heavy."

Photoplay ranked the film as one of the best films of September, 1945, writing that: "The story of Texas Guinan comes to the screen with more or less authenticity and more or less capability in the acting department. Betty Hutton, who plays Texas, certainly gives it wim, wigor and witality, as Sam Weller would say, and sells Texas as we feel she’d like to be sold—solidly."

Photoplay awarded Betty Hutton the best performance of the month of September, 1945, for her performance in Incendiary Blonde.

Universal Pictures, who bought the rights to the film in 1958, and The Film Foudation, restored the film and presented it in 4K resolution on December 17, 2025 at the Academy Museum of Motion Pictures.

== Awards ==
At the 18th Academy Awards in 1946, Robert Emmett Dolan was nominated for "Best Music, Scoring of a Musical Picture" for his work on Incendiary Blonde.
