= Ike Day =

American jazz musician

- Also known as: Ike Day
- Born: Isaac Day Jr. 1925
- Origin: Chicago, Illinois, U.S.
- Died: c. 1958 (aged 32–33)
- Cause of death: Tuberculosis brought on by drug abuse
- Genres: Hard bop; Bebop; Jazz
- Occupation: Musician
- Instrument: Drums
- Years active: 1943–1950s
- Labels: Aristocrat; Chess; Cadet

Isaac Day Jr. (1925 – c. 1958), better known as Ike Day, was a Chicago-based hard bop and bebop jazz drummer.

== Life ==
Referred to as “legendary” by many jazz musicians, including Andrew Hill, very little is known about Day except for a few specific dates when he played with Tom Archia and his All Stars, with Gail Brockman, Andrew "Goon" Gardner or John "Flaps" Dungee, Gene Ammons, Claude McLin (possibly), Junior Mance, George Freeman and Jo Jo Adams, a line-up that recorded at the Pershing Ballroom, Chicago in early 1948, and with Fats Navarro, LeRoy Jackson, Clarence "Sleepy" Anderson, Gene Ammons and Tom Archia at Leonard Chess's club, the Macomba Lounge, in 1948, where both Kenny Dorham and Max Roach went to see him, as did, according to Duke Groner, Buddy Rich and Louie Bellson.

Ike Day started playing professionally in April 1943, at around the age of 17, when he filed a contract with the Musicians Union for a 12-week contract at the Bar o' Music. After a month, however, he was suspended by the Commissioner of Police for bad behaviour.

In April 1944, he was in a band led by Jesse Miller performing at Joe's Deluxe Club, with Albert Atkinson (sax), Kermit Scott (tenor sax), Argonne Thornton (piano), Walter Buchanan (bass).

He also recorded a Gene Ammons/Christine Chatman session for Aristocrat on February 28, 1949, released as Jug and Sonny (Chess LP 1445), The Soulful Saxophone of Gene Ammons (Chess LP 1442) and Gene Ammons – Early Visions (Cadet 2CA 60038).)

In 1950 he led a trio featuring Sonny Rollins and Vernon Bivel just before Rollins was convicted on a drugs charge and sentenced to eight months.

Johnny Griffin recalls that Buddy Rich hired Day to join his big band and that Slim Gaillard took him to New York in the late 1940s, where he played at Minton's. Griffin also called on him to substitute Philly Joe Jones in the Joe Morris-Johnny Griffin band. and refers to Day playing as a duo with Wilbur Ware, double bassist Richard Davis recalls jamming with Ware and Day and Ahmad Jamal mentions having played with him at the Palm Tavern.

Day died in his early 30s, of tuberculosis brought on by drug abuse. According to Roy Haynes, he was living but hospitalized with tuberculosis in the late 1950s.

== Legacy ==
Ike Day was admired by many other drummers, including Tommy Hunter (Sun Ra Arkestra), Roy Haynes and Vernel Fournier, and, according to Wilbur Campbell, both Max Roach and Art Blakey had expressed their admiration for Day, as did Joe Segal in his liner notes to Johnny Griffin's debut solo album on Blue Note, Introducing Johnny Griffin.

Jo Jones described him as "one of the greatest drummers who ever lived". Likewise, Sonny Rollins also refers to Day as one of the finest musicians he ever worked with.

== Discography ==
As sideman

- 1948: Cabbage Head – Tom Archia

1949: Gene Ammons/Christine Chatman session for Aristocrat released as Jug and Sonny (Chess LP 1445), The Soulful Saxophone of Gene Ammons (Chess LP 1442) and Gene Ammons – Early Visions (Cadet 2CA 60038).
