= Maurice Rocco =

American pianist (1915–1976)

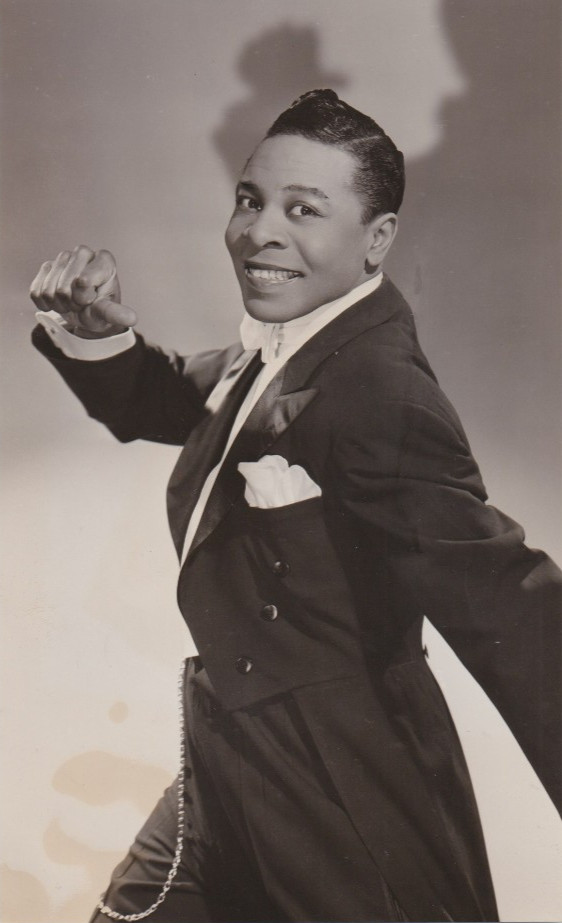
- Rocco in 1944

Background information
- Born: Maurice John Rockhold; June 26, 1915; Oxford, Ohio, United States
- Died: March 25, 1976 (aged 60) Bangkok, Thailand
- Genres: jazz; stride piano
- Years active: 1931–1974
- Labels: Decca; Guild; Musicraft

Maurice Rocco (born Maurice John Rockhold; June 26, 1915 – March 24, 1976) was an American pianist, singer, and composer known for playing boogie-woogie piano and his disdain for using a piano bench. He was a top nightclub and theater draw in the 1940s, and made several film appearances. He toured the United States, Canada, and Europe before becoming a fixture in Bangkok, Thailand, where he was murdered.

== Biography ==
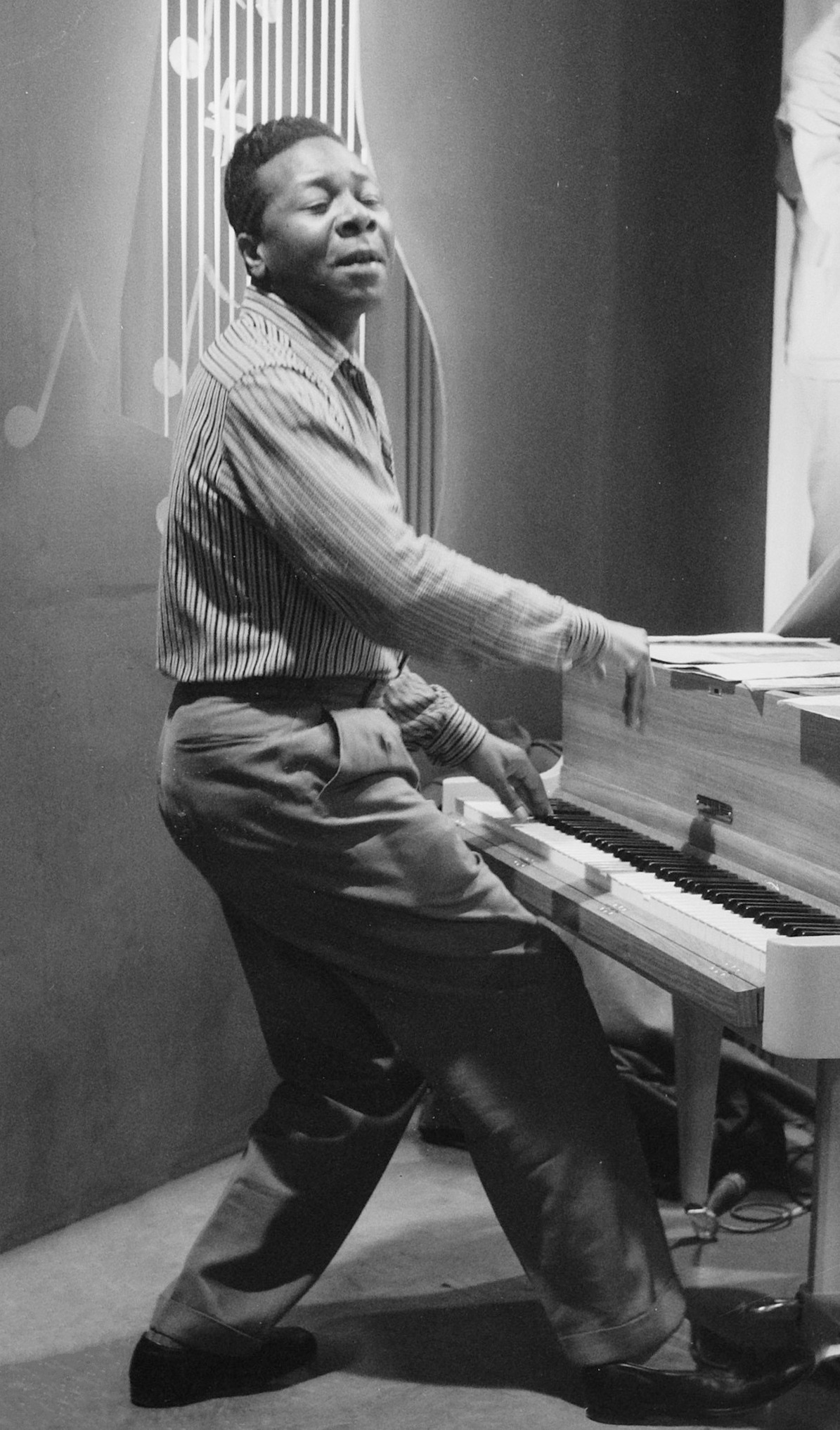
Maurice Rocco in 1960

Maurice Rockhold was born in 1915 in Oxford, Ohio to a music teacher mother. His mother taught him piano starting at a young age, but did not interfere with his interest in rhythm playing as long as he finished his lessons.

He may have entered Miami University as a music student, though he never earned a degree. He worked for radio station WLW. His work at that station impressed Noble Sissle so much that he hired him to work with the Rogers Sisters at the Kit Kat Club in New York, and the act was renamed The Three Roccos. He was to later legally change his last name from Rockhold to Rocco. In 1938, Rocco left the club to participate in two films, Vogues of 1938 and 52nd Street. He returned to New York to form his own band, which included Alton Moore, Arville Harris, and Bobby Holmes among its members. By the early 1940s he was no longer fronting a band, but was working as a solo act.

Between 1940 and 1941 he cut 14 sides for Decca, most of which were released on their "Sepia" series. He did not join active military service because his poor eyesight classified him as 4-F, but during World War II he entertained American troops, both in person and as part of the American Forces Network Jubilee radio program. Rocco spent most of the 1940s headlining at nightclubs and theaters (where his engagements would extend into months) and participating in vaudeville revues. By 1944 he had a US $500,000 insurance policy on his hands. Alongside Mary Lou Williams, he represented the United States in the second African Dance Festival at Carnegie Hall in April 1945. He married a woman named Iantha on July 3 of that year. Later in 1945, he appeared in his most famous role in the film Incendiary Blond. His earnings in 1945 topped U.S. $250,000. Despite all the professional success, this marriage was short lived. Iantha filed for divorce before their first anniversary amid allegations of physical and mental abuse. He signed to RCA Victor Records in 1949.

In the early 1950s he made tours of Europe and Southeast Asia. Alongside Slim Gaillard, he was in 1953 solicited to play a lead role in a film to be entitled "Two Joes from Georgia". Rocco fell into legal difficulties in the 1950s regarding bad checks: he was jailed over Christmas 1957 in Cleveland, and was accused of the same offense in July 1958. He moved to Europe before spending the last 12–15 years of his life performing in Thailand, where he had a residency at the Bamboo Bar in the Oriental Hotel in Bangkok. He was found slashed to death in his apartment. The murder occurred on March 24, 1976. The murder weapon was his own Malaysian knife. He is buried at Woodside Cemetery in Oxford.

== Performance style ==
Rocco was billed as "Maurice Rocco and His Rockin' Rhythm" in nightclubs and his recordings. He was most famous for standing while playing, without using a piano bench. The origin of his playing posture has been credited to different sources. In 1944 Rocco claimed that he started standing in 1941, when a customer was sitting on his piano bench and Rocco, intimidated by the heft of this customer, decided that it would be best to play without the customary seat. He eschewed a piano bench from this point on because of the positive reaction from the crowd that night. However, Rocco told the story very differently at various times, and he was known to stand while playing as early as the 1930s, rendering the story about 1941 all but impossible. While playing, Rocco would alternately beat out the rhythm with his feet, or perform dance moves. Billboard described his playing as "Rocking and Riotous" but panned his singing ability. His nightclub performances were known to be uncommonly boisterous for the period, even moving the piano from one end of the stage to the other with "violent energy," but Duke Ellington and Mabel Mercer praised his ability to perform in a sophisticated manner. His showmanship was as recognized as his piano playing, and he was known to favor wearing a pea-green dinner jacket. His performance style is said to have influenced Little Richard and Jerry Lee Lewis. Critic Peter Silvester describes Rocco's boogie-woogie style as "technically slick" but "devoid of genuine boogie-woogie tone coloring."

== Legacy and influence ==
Rocco was a headlining act for much of the 1940s, both in the United States and England. His stand-up piano playing became a byline. Because of his appearances in Hollywood musicals and "soundies" (musical short films) that were exported to Britain during the Second World War, Rocco's playing style was to influence several European post-war boogie-woogie specialists. He was an early influence on Ramsey Lewis and Bobby Short.

A biography of Maurice Rocco, written by music scholar Benjamin Tausig, was published by Duke University Press in 2025.

== Recordings ==
Rocco made his first recordings, for Decca, recording 12 sides in 1940 and 1941. Some of his most popular recordings first appeared on the Guild label, where he recorded 8 sides, with Cozy Cole on drums and Mack Stewart on bass. When this label went out of business, its catalog was sold to Musicraft Records in 1946, which re-issued all 8 of them. He cut 10 new sides for Musicraft in September, 1946, 7 of which were re-issued by Allegro on a vinyl 10-inch LP in 1957. A Musicraft album of 78's numbered 449-452 was issued in 1946.

=== Discography ===
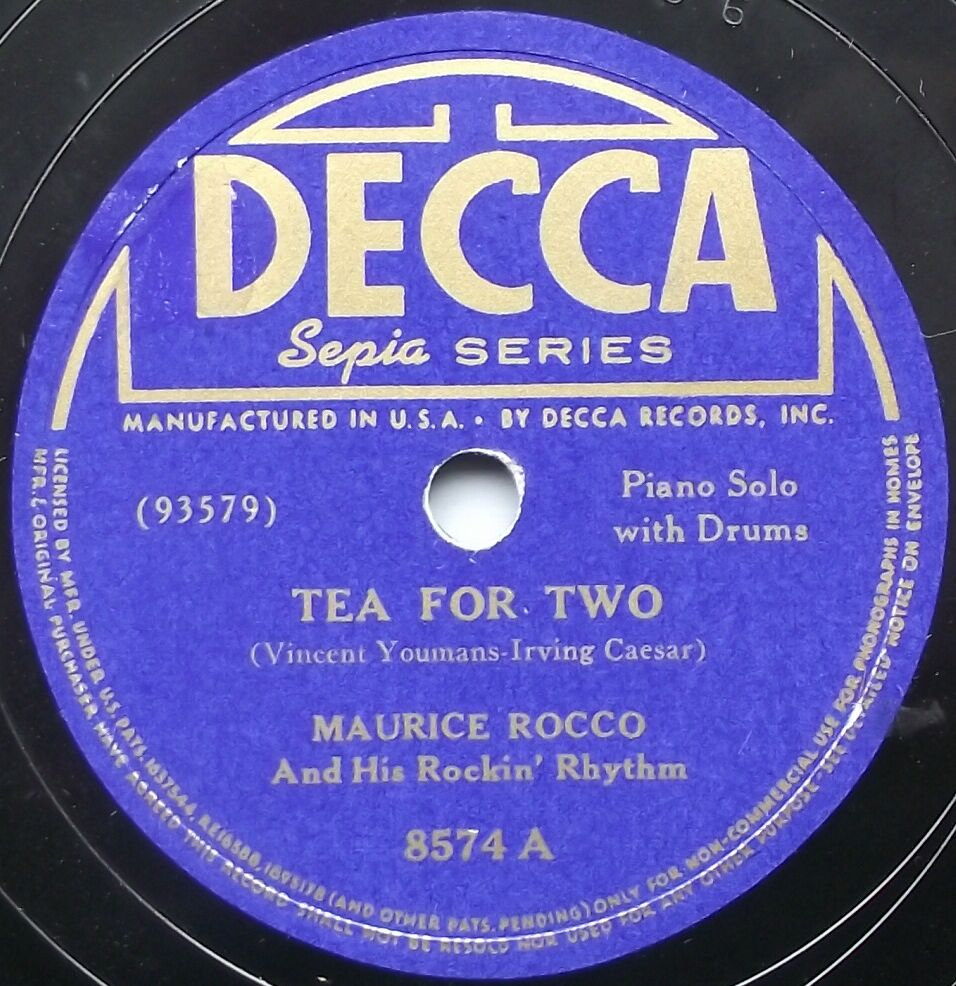
Decca 8574, Tea for Two

Title	Recording Date	Issue	Notes
Rhumboogie	September 27, 1940	Decca 8504	
Rocco Blues	September 27, 1940	Decca 8504	
Rocco's Boogie Woogie	September 27, 1940	Decca 8523	
Tonky Blues	September 27, 1940	Decca 8523	
Donkey Serenade, The	September 27, 1940	Decca 8533	
Jungle Drums	September 27, 1940	Decca 8533	
Java Jive	March 11, 1941	Decca 8544	
Little Rock Getaway	March 11, 1941	Decca 8544	
Hold Me Baby	March 11, 1941	Decca 8558	
How Come You Do Me Like You Do?	March 11, 1941	Decca 8558	
Tea for Two	March 11, 1941	Decca 8574	
One I Love (Belongs to Somebody Else), The	March 11, 1941	Decca 8574	
St. Louis Blues *	1945	Guild 102, Musicraft 353*	
Begin the Beguine *	1945	Guild 102, Musicraft 353*	
In the Shade of the Old Apple Tree	1945	Guild 103, Musicraft 368	
Tunke Blues	1945	Guild 103, Musicraft 368	
Cocktails for Two	1945	Guild 117, Musicraft 364	
Sugar	1945	Guild 117, Musicraft 364	
I Can't Get Started	–	Musicraft 427	
Blue Skies	1945	Guild 148, Musicraft 427	
Lullaby of Broadway	1945	Guild 148	
At Sundown	September 1946	Musicraft 443, Allegro 4110 (LP)	
My Tzatzkela	September 1946	Musicraft 443	
Somebody Loves Me	September 1946	Musicraft 449	
Invitation to the Blues	September 1946	Musicraft 449, Allegro 4110 (LP)	
You Can Depend of Me	September 1946	Musicraft 450, Allegro 4110 (LP)	
On the Sunny Side of the Street	September 1946	Musicraft 450, Allegro 4110 (LP)	
Hour of Parting, The	September 1946	Musicraft 451	
Rose Room	September 1946	Musicraft 451, Allegro 4110 (LP)	
Wrap Your Troubles in Dreams	September 1946	Musicraft 452, Allegro 4110 (LP)	
Easter Parade	September 1946	Musicraft 452, Allegro 4110 (LP)	

*There are two versions of each of these sides. St. Louis Blues, matrix A.G.634-A recorded by Guild and issued as Guild 102. Re-issued as Musicraft 353 B, some with matrix A.G.634-A and some simply with 634-A. Re-recorded by Musicraft, matrix 5391-B, and issued also as Musicraft 353 B. Begin The Beguine, matrix A.G.633-A recorded by Guild and issued as Guild 102. Re-issued as Musicraft 353 A, some with matrix A.G.633-A and some with just 633-A. Re-recorded by Musicraft, matrix 5390-B, and also issued as 353 A. For both songs, the Musicraft paper labels all say 5390 and 5391, only the matrix numbers on the shellac distinguish the takes.

== Compositions ==
- Boogie Woogie
- Rocco's Boogie Woogie
- Tonky Blues
- Tunke Blues

== Film ==
Rocco appeared in numerous Hollywood musicals in the 1940s and 1950s.

- 1938 – Vogues of 1938 – "Rocco" (pianist)
- 1938 – 52nd Street – himself
- 1943 – Rhumboogie (short) – himself
- 1945 – Incendiary Blonde – himself (waiter/pianist)
- 1947 – Rocco Blues (short) – himself
- 1947 – Sunny Side of the Street

== Radio ==
Rocco appeared regularly on network radio programs. Besides the usual guest spots, he was featured regularly on Duffy's Tavern and The Radio Hall of Fame.
