= Rhumboogie Café =

Nightclub in Chicago, Illinois, US

The Rhumboogie Café
- Location: 343 East 55th Street (United States) Chicago, Illinois, USA
- Type: Nightclub
- Events: Blues; Jazz; Bebop; Rhythm and blues Soul

Construction
- Opened: 1942
- Closed: 1947

The Rhumboogie Café, also referred to as the Rhumboogie Club, was an important, but short-lived nightclub at 343 East 55th Street, Chicago.

Opened with great fanfare in April 1942, the Rhumboogie was owned by Charlie Glenn and boxing champion Joe Louis. The club closed as the result of a fire on December 31, 1945. Reopening in June 1946, it never regained its old form, and closed for good in May 1947.

== Performances ==
The opening night's performance was the first of Tiny Bradshaw and His Orchestra's eight-week residency. This stint was followed by Horace Henderson. An early, regular performer was T-Bone Walker, who first performed there in August 1942, with backing by the Milt Larkin band, during their 9-month residency there.

Other acts over the years included:

- Fletcher Henderson
- Walter Dyett and His Swing Orchestra
- International Sweethearts of Rhythm
- Nat Towles – 3-month residency in 1943
- Gatemouth Moore
- Sarah Vaughan
- Ruth Lee Jones, just before changing her name to Dinah Washington
- Jeter-Pillars Orchestra
- Wynonie Harris
- Little Miss Cornshucks c1942
- The Dream Band - Carroll Dickerson, Charlie Parker, Eddie Johnson, Tom Archia, Gail Brockman, Paul King, Hillard Brown, Johnny Houser, Raymond Orr, Calvin Ladnier, Gerald Valentine, Milburn Newman, Marl Young, Clarence Mason, and Hillard Brown, among others.

== The Rhumboogie label ==
In October 1944, the Rhumboogie Recording Company, coinciding with T-Bone Walker's third stint at the venue, recorded him accompanied by pianist Marl Young leading the Rhumboogie house band, which included Red Saunders.

By then distributed by the newly founded Mercury Records, Rhumboogie set up a second recording session with Walker for December 19, 1945.

After reopening the venue in June 1946, plans were announced to record other artists but, like the venue itself, the label closed shortly after. The only other artist to get a release on Rhumboogie was Buster Bennett, recording under the name of his trumpet player, Charles Gray. Mercury later re-issued the material from the December 1945 T-Bone session.
