= Arnett Blows for 1300 =

Arnett Blows For 1300

Compilation album by Arnett Cobb
- Released: 1994
- Recorded: May 13 and August, 1947
- Studio: New York City
- Genre: Jazz
- Length: 39:44
- Label: Delmark; DD-471
- Producer: Robert G. Koester, Steve Wagner

Arnett Blows For 1300 is an album by the American jazz saxophonist Arnett Cobb, compiling recordings from 1947 originally released on Apollo Records, that was released by the Delmark label in 1995.

== Reception ==
Professional ratings
Review scores
Source	Rating
Allmusic	4.5/5 stars

Allmusic reviewer Scott Yanow stated "The spirited tenor (who straddled the boundaries between swing and early R&B) is in prime early form with his sextet on a variety of basic material, much of it blues-oriented. ... This very accessible music is both danceable and full of exciting performances that were formerly rare".

== Track listing ==
All compositions by Arnett Cobb except where noted

1. "Arnett Blows for 1300" – 2:49
2. "Go Red Go" – 2:40
3. "Walkin' with Sid" – 3:05
4. "Dutch Kitchen Bounce" – 3:14
5. "Running with Ray" – 3:02
6. "Big League Blues" (Arnett Cobb, Milt Larkin) – 2:43
7. "Cobb's Idea" – 3:09
8. "When I Grow Too Old to Dream" (Sigmund Romberg, Oscar Hammerstein II) – 5:31
9. "Pay It No Mind" – 3:00
10. "Cobb's Boogie" (Cobb, Cootie Williams) – 2:48
11. "Flower Garden Blues" (Cobb, O. Shaw) – 3:08
12. "Cobb's Corner" – 2:43
13. "Top Flight" – 2:56
14. "Chick She Ain't Nowhere" (Cobb, Larkin) – 3:01
15. "Still Flying" – 2:35

== Personnel ==
- Arnett Cobb – tenor saxophone
- Dave Page – trumpet
- Al King (tracks 3, 7, 13 & 15), Booty Wood (tracks 1, 2, 4–6, 8–11 & 14) – trombone
- George Rhodes – piano
- Walter Buchanan – bass
- George Jones – drums
- Milt Larkin – vocals (tracks 6, 11 & 14)
