= Earl Washington (musician) =

American jazz musician

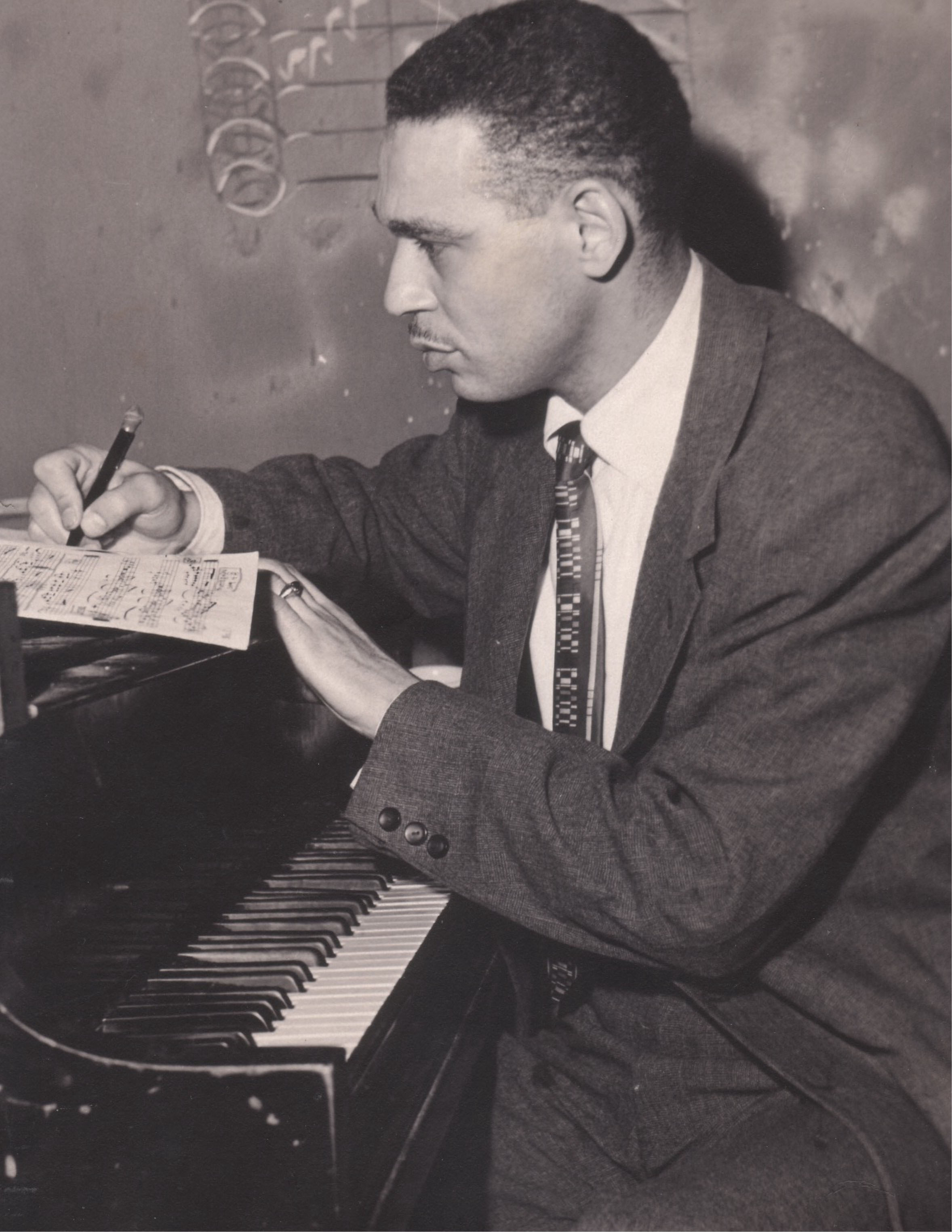
- Born: Earl Edward Washington; April 3, 1921; Chicago, Illinois
- Died: June 18, 1975 (aged 54); Evergreen Park, Illinois
- Occupation: Jazz pianist
- Spouse: Dorothy Jean

Earl Edward Washington (April 3, 1921 – June 18, 1975), also known as "The Ghost", was an American jazz pianist.

== Early life ==
Earl Edward Washington was born on April 3, 1921, in Bronzeville, a neighboorhoods in Douglas, Chicago, Illinois. Washington has two older sisters. His parents experienced hard economic times in the pre- and post-Depression era, moving to the small neighborhood of Morgan Park. Washington attended Washburn High School, which his mother enrolled him in due to his interest in "the arts".

As a young boy, Washington aspired to be a jazz pianist. But his mother, a church organist, encouraged him to study classical musical themes, as she had done. She arranged classical piano lessons with Dr. Walter Keller (Director of the Sherwood Music School, in charge of the Organ and Theory Departments in the Fine Arts Building, Chicago, Illinois). Kellers advised her not to change his eye–hand coordination that was so envied by most ragtime musicians of the era.

In the summer of 1938, Washington competed in the Chicago Golden Gloves boxing tournament. It is unknown if he won the event in his 160-pound weight class.

After dropping out of high school in his junior year, he worked as a laborer at Inland Steel located in nearby East Chicago, Indiana.

During World War II, Washington enlisted in the United States Navy as an Apprentice Seaman II, as a musician (MU SEA). He joined the Illinois Great Lakes Navy Orchestra from 1943 to 1945.

After time spent in the Navy, he attended both the Boston and Chicago Conservatories of Music. He joined the Chicago Musicians' Union Local 10–208 on November 15, 1945.

== Career ==
Washington joined the Red Saunders Band in 1949 at the popular nightclub Club DeLisa, where he remained until the mid-1950s. On leaving Saunders' band, Washington worked in the recording studios of Chicago, Detroit, and New York City. He wrote music for Motown artists and recorded scores and jingles with Chicago's jazz pioneer/innovator Quincy Jones and nationally known Chicago disc jockey Herb Kent on Chicago's WVON Radio.

While representing the Motown jazz imprint and releasing a couple of LPs on its sub-label Workshop Jazz Records, Washington worked as a featured artist at Chicago's Blue Note Club, the Gaslight Club, and the Playboy Club.

Before his death, Washington worked at The Inn Place, taught private piano lessons, and lectured on "The History of Jazz" at Indiana University.

Washington's nickname, "The Ghost", grew out of his light skin complexion.

Johnny Pate wrote the following notes for Washington's Workshop released LP "Reflections."

"There is much that can be said about a serious musician, and Earl Washington is a very serious musician. He is the kind of musician who spends practically all of his time working on his music in one way or another. When he is not practicing at the piano, he’s writing either original works or arrangements. In his spare time, he listens to some of his favorites, which include Art Tatum, Oscar Peterson, Quincy Jones, plus contemporary composers such as Ravel, Stravinsky, and Bernstein."

“Earl evidently does not believe in the biblical admonition, ‘Let not thy left hand know what thy right hand doesth,’ at least not when he's playing piano. For on ‘It Ain’t Necessary So’ he uses both hands , and each definitely knows what the other is doing. It is the left hand playing that pleasant intro leading into the gently rollicking syncopation that is the mood of the ‘preaching’ right hand throughout the recording."

"At present, Earl is engaged in composing a suite entitled, “Omen Portend.” This work will feature the piano with an orchestral background. He is in hopes of recording it in the very near future.

“Reflections,” the title tune, is a blues with a Far Eastern tint. Earl seems to be remembering a trip through valleys, hills, and streams in some faraway land. Vernel Fournier (Drummer) seems delighted with the trip, eager to move around that next rhythmical corner. Israel Crosby (Bassist) seems to have been there before; he moves ably, steadily, surely throughout. “Reflections” is a musical journey the listener will want to make again and again.

"Mr. Washington’s treatment of “After Hours” is quite unique, due to the fact that he first does a rendition quite close to the original Avery Parrish version. Then he expresses his personal feeling for this."

- Mr. Pate worked as a Pianist, Bassist; an Arranger of Production Numbers for the Club Delisa (in the 1950s); a Composer, Conductor, and Producer is an important figure in the evolution of music on the Chicago music scene. His name appears in the credits of classic hits by Curtis Mayfield and The Impressions. He also acts on Okeh Records and Workshop Jazz label; wrote and scored “Shaft In Africa,” which became a theme backdrop for Jay Z’ 2006 platinum award winning CD Show Me What You Got.

== Personal life ==
Washington was married to Dorothy Jean for 20 years. They raised six sons in their Chicago south side community home in Washington Heights.

Washington died of a heart attack on June 18, 1975, in Evergreen Park.

== Discography ==
Earl Washington, a Career

The majority of Washington's recordings were with big bands.

From 1947 to 1954 Washington was part of Red Saunders Band at the Club Delisa.

Washington also made several recordings with his band “Earl Washington, All Star Jazz” (1954-1964).

Year Recorded	Title	Genre	Label
1949	Love Me Baby	Big Band	Atlantic
1949	I'll Get Along Somehow	Big Band	Atlantic
1949	I'll Get Along Somehow, Part 2	Big Band	Atlantic
1949	Happiness Is A Thing Called Joe	Big Band	Atlantic
1949	Rocking Blues	Big Band	Atlantic
1950	Baby I Don't Love You Anymore	Traditional Jazz	Theron
1952	Hambone	Crossover Jazz	OKeh
1952	Summertime	Traditional Jazz	Blue Lake
1952	Riverboat	Traditional Jazz	Blue Lake
1954	Blue Mambo	Crossover Jazz	Theron
1954	Forward Blow	Crossover Jazz	Theron
1955	I've Got News for You	Crossover Jazz	Theron
1955	Grand, Nice, Swell	Crossover Jazz	Theron
1955	Whole Lotta Money	Traditional Jazz	Theron
1955	I'm Just a Fool	Traditional Jazz	Theron
1955	Cool Mambo	Crossover Jazz	Theron
1955	Love	Crossover Jazz	Theron
1955	Remainder	Crossover Jazz	Theron
1955	Baia	Traditional Jazz	Theron
1955	Don't	Traditional Jazz	Theron
1955	What Jolly Folks	Traditional Jazz	Theron
1955	Saving My Love	Traditional Jazz	Theron
1955	I Haven't Got the Heart	Traditional Jazz	Theron
1958	Miserlou	Surf	Checker
1958	Wolf Call	Surf	Checker
1962	Opus No. 3	Traditional Jazz	Workshop
1962	Taste Time	Traditional Jazz	Workshop
1962	The Swinging Jesters Blues	Traditional Jazz	Workshop
1962	March Lightly	Traditional Jazz	Workshop
1962	Tony's Tune	Traditional Jazz	Workshop
1962	The Ghost	Traditional Jazz	Workshop
1962	Blues in the Night	Blue Note	Argo
1962	Stella by Starlight	Blue Note	Argo
1962	The Way You Look Tonight	Blue Note	Argo
1962	Through for the Night	Blue Note	Argo
1962	Stardust	Blue Note	Argo
1962	Night and Day	Blue Note	Argo
1962	Laughing Tonight	Blue Note	Argo
1963	Reflections	Latin Jazz	Workshop
1963	Trees	Latin Jazz	Workshop
1963	Lover	Latin Jazz	Workshop
1963	Cuban Carnival	Latin Jazz	Workshop
1963	After Hour	Latin Jazz	Workshop
1963	It Ain't Necessarily So	Latin Jazz	Workshop
1966	Thoroughly Modern Millie	Blue Note	Decca
1966	The Tapioca	Blue Note	Decca
1966	Do It Again	Blue Note	Decca
1966	Poor Butterfly	Blue Note	Decca
1966	Jimmy	Blue Note	Decca
1966	Stumbling	Blue Note	Decca
1966	Rose of Washington Square	Blue Note	Decca
1966	Jazz Baby	Blue Note	Decca
1966	Baby Face	Blue Note	Decca
1966	The Jewish Wedding Song	Blue Note	Decca
1966	Charmaine	Blue Note	Decca
1966	Japanese Sandman	Blue Note	Decca
1967	Clarinet Marmalade	Dixieland	Jazz LTD.
1967	Canal Street Blues	Dixieland	Jazz LTD.
1967	Bill Bailey	Dixieland	Jazz LTD.
1967	Just A Little While To Stay Here	Dixieland	Jazz LTD.
1967	Georgia On My Mind	Dixieland	Jazz LTD.
1967	The World I Waiting For The Sunrise	Dixieland	Jazz LTD.
1967	Lass Trombone	Dixieland	Jazz LTD.
1967	Georgia Camp Meeting	Dixieland	Jazz LTD.
1967	Tiger Rag	Dixieland	Jazz LTD.
1967	Shake That Thing	Dixieland	Jazz LTD.
1967	That's A Plenty	Dixieland	Jazz LTD.
1996	MISIRLOU Re-Released	Surf	Hipo
