= Zinky Cohn =

American jazz musician (1908–1952)

Zinky Cohn (August 18, 1908, Oakland, California – April 26, 1952, Chicago) was an American jazz pianist.

Cohn played in Chicago in the late 1920s, including in Jimmie Noone's Apex Club Orchestra (1928–30); he recorded with Noone extensively between 1929 and 1934, especially for Vocalion Records. Many of the tunes Noone recorded were written and/or arranged by Cohn, including "Apex Blues" (previously attributed to Earl Hines).

Cohn also recorded as a leader in the early 1930s, with a band that featured Leon Washington on tenor saxophone. Cohn recorded with Frankie Franko & His Louisianans in 1930, and also accompanied blues singers such as Georgia White.

Later in the 1930s Cohn led the Chicago musicians' union, and continued to play locally.
