= Kermit Scott (musician) =

American jazz musician

Kermit "Scotty" Scott (died February 2, 2002) was an American jazz tenor saxophonist. Dizzy Gillespie considered Scott “one of the founders of our music” [bop].

Born in Beaumont, Texas, Scott's first professional work was with Bunk Johnson's band before touring with other jazz bands and minstrel shows, eventually arriving in New York in 1936.

In 1940 he played in two different line-ups backing Billie Holiday at recording sessions in New York for Columbia. The first, on February 29, featured Roy Eldridge on trumpet, Carl Frye and Jimmy Powell on alto saxophones, Scott on tenor saxophone, Sonny White on piano, Lawrence Lucie on guitar, John Williams on bass, and Hal West on drums. The second session, on June 7, had Eldridge again, with Bill Bowen and Joe Eldridge on alto saxophones, Scott and Lester Young on tenor saxophones, Teddy Wilson on piano, Freddie Green on guitar, Walter Page on bass, and J.C. Heard on drums.

He also played in Coleman Hawkins' orchestra in 1940. That same year, he joined Teddy Hill's band, the first house band at Minton's, with Thelonious Monk, Kenny Clarke and Joe Guy.

In April 1944, he was in a band led by Jesse Miller performing at Joe's Deluxe Club, with Albert Atkinson (sax), Ike Day (drums), Argonne Thornton (piano), and Walter Buchanan (bass).
