= Leon Washington (musician) =

American jazz musician

Leon Diamond Washington (June 27, 1909, Jackson, Mississippi – February 19, 1973, Chicago) was an American jazz tenor saxophonist.

Born in Mississippi, Washington grew up in Chicago from the age of three. He started on clarinet before moving on to tenor saxophone, and studied under Santy Runyon. After finishing high school, he played professionally from 1926, joining Zinky Cohn's band and recording with Frankie Franko (1930) and Bernie Young & the Creolians (1931–33). He played with Carroll Dickerson from 1934-35 at the Sunset Cafe in Chicago, then played briefly with Louis Armstrong in 1935.

He played with Earl Hines in 1937, before joining Red Saunders' group, where he remained for the next 25 years, recording with him extensively in addition to occasionally releasing material under his own name. Leaving Saunders' band in 1963, he became an official at the Chicago musicians' union.

Washington died of leukemia in 1973.
