= Walter Dyett =

American violinist and music educator (1901–1969)

- Dyett (cira. 1958)
- Born: Walter Henri Dyett; January 11, 1901; Chicago, Illinois, U.S.
- Died: November 17, 1969 (aged 68); Chicago, Illinois
- Education: University of California, Berkeley; VanderCook College of Music
- Occupations: Violinist, music educator
- Years active: 1931–62
- Known for: Music director at DuSable High School; Music director at Phillips High School

Walter Henri Dyett (also known as Captain Walter Henri Dyett; January 11, 1901 – November 17, 1969) was an American violinist and music educator in the Chicago Public Schools system. He served as music director and assistant music director at Chicago's predominantly African-American high schools; Wendell Phillips High School and DuSable High School. Dyett served as musical director at DuSable High School from its opening in 1935 until 1962. He trained many students who became professional musicians.

== Career ==
After studying pre-medical courses at University of California, Berkeley, Dyett returned to his home town of Chicago, where he worked in vaudeville orchestras and directed an Army band, after which he was known as Captain Dyett. In 1931, he became assistant musical director and later musical director at Wendell Phillips High School in Chicago and, in 1935, moved to DuSable High School when it opened. He received his B.M. degree at VanderCook College of Music (Chicago) in 1938, and his M.M. degree at the Chicago Musical College in 1942.

== DuSable High School ==
=== Students ===
Among the musicians who studied in Dyett's program are:

- Gene Ammons
- Fred Below
- Ronnie Boykins
- Oscar Brashear
- Homer Brown
- Wilbur Campbell
- Sonny Cohn
- Nat King Cole
- Jerome Cooper
- Richard Davis
- Bo Diddley
- Dorothy Donegan
- Jimmy Ellis
- George Freeman
- Von Freeman
- John Gilmore
- Bennie Green
- Johnny Griffin
- Eddie Harris
- Johnny Hartman
- Milt Hinton (at Phillips)
- Fred Hopkins
- Joseph Jarman
- Leroy Jenkins
- Clifford Jordan
- Claude McLin
- Jesse Miller
- John E. Myatt
- Harold Ousley
- Pat Patrick
- Walter Perkins
- Julian Priester
- Wilbur Ware
- Dinah Washington
- John Young
- Redd Foxx
- Red Holloway

== Death/Legacy ==
Dyett died on November 17, 1969, aged 68. He is commemorated by Dyett High School, a Chicago public high school located in the Washington Park neighborhood in Chicago.

== Bibliography ==
- "DU SABLE HIGH MUSIC CHIEF A STAR MAKER by Roi Ottley - Chicago Daily Tribune (1872-1963); Jan 9, 1960; pg. B12" for more biographical information.
- An Autobiobraphy of Black Jazz by Dempsey J. Travis (1983)
