= Gatemouth Moore =

American blues and gospel singer (1913-2004)

- Moore in Memphis in 1957

Background information
- Born: Arnold Dwight Moore; November 8, 1913; Topeka, Kansas, U.S.
- Origin: Memphis, Tennessee, U.S.
- Died: May 19, 2004 (aged 90) Yazoo City, Mississippi, U.S.
- Genres: Blues; gospel
- Occupations: Singer; songwriter; pastor
- Instrument: Vocals
- Years active: c. 1930–1977
- Labels: Gay Paree; Damon; National; King; Chess; Coral; Blues Spectrum

Arnold Dwight "Gatemouth" Moore (November 8, 1913 – May 19, 2004) was an American blues and gospel singer, songwriter, radio disc jockey, community leader and pastor, later known as Reverend Gatemouth Moore. During his career as a recording artist, Moore worked with Bennie Moten, Tommy Douglas and Walter Barnes, and his songs were recorded by B.B. King and Rufus Thomas. He was noted for his mellow singing voice, much in the style of Billy Eckstine.

== Biography ==
Moore was born in Topeka, Kansas, and raised in Memphis, Tennessee, where he sang ballads and spirituals in his youth. He graduated from Booker T. Washington High School in Memphis. Around 1930 he left home, joined F. S. Wolcott's Rabbit's Foot Minstrels, and began performing with Ida Cox, Ma Rainey and Bertha "Chippie" Hill. He toured widely but settled in Clarksdale, Mississippi, around 1934.

According to some sources his nickname was derived from his loud speaking and singing voice, but Moore himself repeated a story that at a performance in Atlanta a drunken woman told him to "sing it, you gatemouth sonofabitch". He sang with the bands of Bennie Moten, Walter Barnes, and with the Dub Jenkins band in Memphis. In 1940, he was working with Barnes but was outside the hall when Barnes and most of his band died in the Natchez Rhythm Club fire.

He made his first recordings in 1941 for the Gay Paree record label in Kansas City, Missouri, and moved between residencies in Kansas City, Memphis and Chicago. He recorded for Damon Records and National Records and then for King Records in Cincinnati, Ohio. His songs, often improvised and based on actual incidents in his life, included "I Ain't Mad at You Pretty Baby", "Did You Ever Love a Woman", and "Somebody's Got to Go". Several of his compositions were recorded by other performers, including Louis Jordan, Lonnie Johnson, Johnny Otis, Rufus Thomas, Jimmy Witherspoon, and B. B. King, who regarded Moore as a major influence and as "one of the greatest blues singers ever". Moore re-recorded many of his songs for King in 1947. He was also responsible for recruiting the blues singer Wynonie Harris to the label.

Moore was reportedly the first blues singer to perform at the Apollo Theater and many other theaters around the country, including Carnegie Hall in New York City. In Chicago, he appeared regularly at the Rhumboogie and at the Club DeLisa. At the latter club, in December 1948, he shocked clubgoers by stopping his performance of "I Ain't Mad at You Pretty Baby" and singing an old spiritual. Moore said, "Folks started screaming. They thought I had lost my mind. I just singing and crying 'Shine on Me'... I walked off [stage] and walked right out the club and folks were hollering and screaming. When I walked out to the bar, one of the greatest preachers in Chicago was sitting out there and said, 'Gate, I be waiting on you'."

In 1949, Moore was ordained as a minister of the First Church of Deliverance in Chicago, becoming a bishop. He maintained his flair for showmanship in his work as a minister and gospel singer, on one occasion delivering an Easter sermon from a funeral casket with hearse and pallbearers, to raise money for charity. He recorded gospel music for Chess and Coral and became a DJ at radio stations in Memphis, Birmingham, and Chicago. He also became the pastor of several churches in Mississippi and Louisiana, including in later years Yazoo City, Mississippi. According to his citation on the Mississippi Blues Trail, "His elegance and exuberance enabled him to easily cross social, racial, and religious lines, and though he devoted himself to the church, community work, charities, and education, he still enjoyed singing the blues on occasion." He became an MC at both blues festivals and religious conventions, president of the Birmingham Black Barons baseball team, and a leader of the "black Elks" (Improved Benevolent and Protective Order of Elks of the World).

He made his last recordings for Johnny Otis' Blues Spectrum label in 1977, including a new song, "Beale Street Ain't Beale Street No More". A brass note on Beale Street Walk of Fame was dedicated to Moore in 1996. He was also featured in the documentary film The Road to Memphis, directed and photographed by Richard Pearce), a part of the 2003 series The Blues, of which Martin Scorsese was the executive producer.

He died in Yazoo City, Mississippi, in 2004 at the age of 90.
