= Leroy Harris Sr. =

American jazz guitarist (1895–1969)

Le Roy W. Harris Sr. (February 1895 – March 1969) was an American jazz multi-instrumentalist, who played banjo, guitar, and flute.

Harris was born into a musical family; one brother was violinist Jesse Harris, another was reedist Arville Harris, and his sister Marie Harris was a pianist. He was a member of Fletcher Henderson's Rainbow Orchestra in 1925 and worked with Leroy Tibbs in 1928. He was a member of several groups led by Clarence Williams and recorded with him on several occasions between 1926 and 1930. He played with bandleaders Maurice Rocco, Leroy Smith, and Jesse Stone in the 1930s, and in the 1940s played with Horace Henderson, Willie Bryant, and Tiny Bradshaw.
