= Dyett High School =

Art high school in Chicago, Illinois, United States

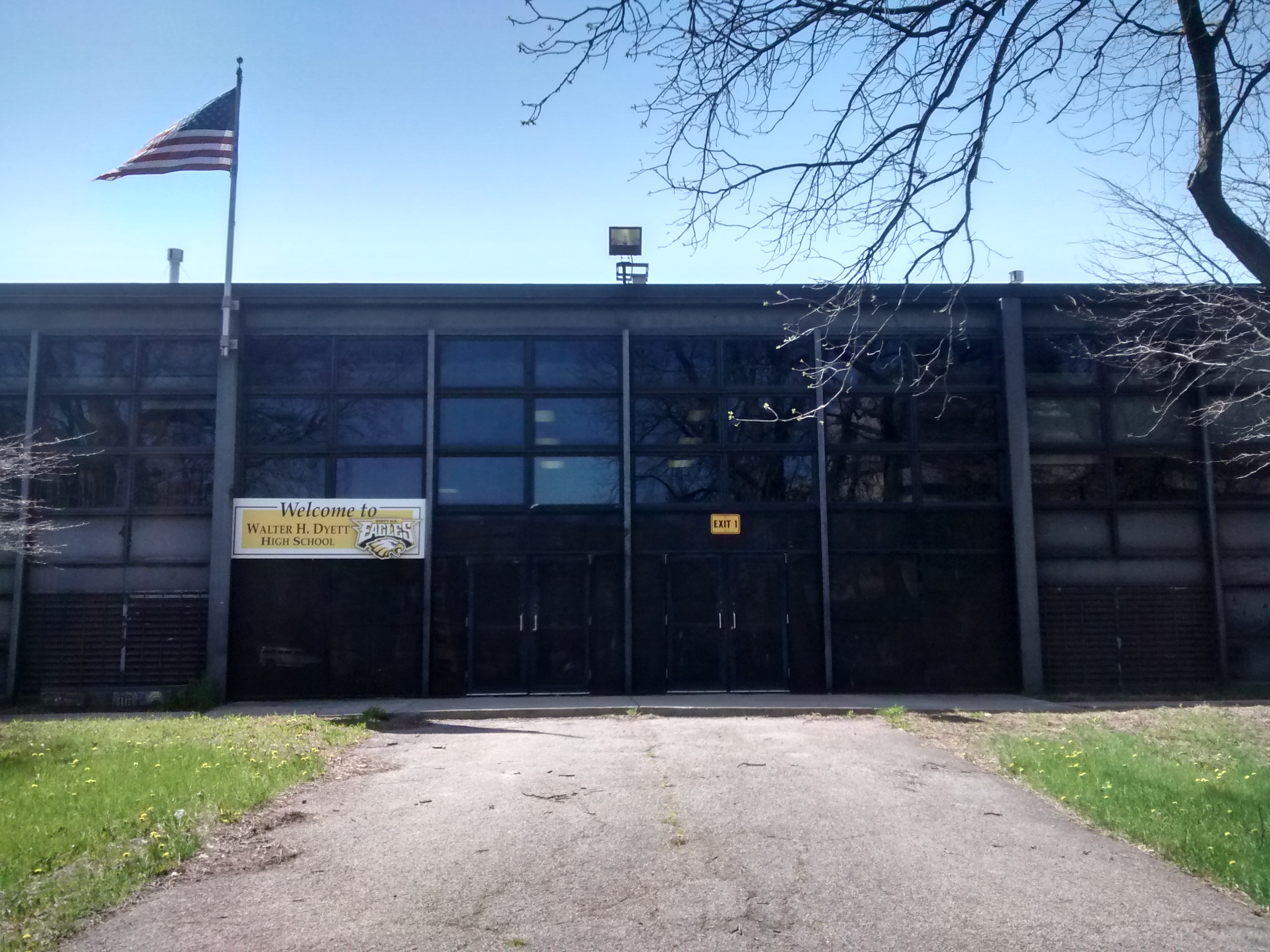
- Main entrance, 2015.

Location
- 555 E. 51st Street; Chicago, Illinois 60615; United States; 41.8012°N 87.6123°W

Information
- School type: Public; Secondary; Performing Arts
- Motto: "New Century. New Needs. New Direction."
- Opened: 1972; 2016 (as Dyett HS of Arts)
- Closed: 2015
- School district: Chicago Public Schools
- CEEB code: 140726
- Principal: Doreatha Butler
- Grades: 9–12
- Gender: Coed
- Enrollment: 506 (2024–2025)
- Campus type: Urban
- Colors: Black; Gold
- Athletics conference: Chicago Public League
- Team name: Eagles
- Accreditation: North Central Association of Colleges and Schools
- Website: newdyett.org

Walter Henri Dyett High School For The Arts (formerly known as Dyett Academic Center and commonly known as Dyett High School) is a public 4–year performing arts high school located in the Washington Park neighborhood on the south side of Chicago, Illinois, United States. The school opened in 1972. Dyett is a part of the Chicago Public Schools system and is named for American violinist and music educator Walter Henri Dyett (1901–1969). The school became an arts high school for the 2016–17 school year.

== History ==
Dyett first opened in September 1972 as a neighborhood middle school. Connected by a tunnel to the Dyett Recreation Center, it was built under a joint governance agreement with the Chicago Park District, under which the community had access to the recreation center when school was not in session. The recreation center's pool provided a particularly important community asset, because no other public pools were available in Bronzeville. At the direction of CPS head Paul Vallas, the school became a high school in 1999. Two years later, the recreation center was closed to the public. In contrast to the limited-admission King College Prep that was opened nearby at the same time, Dyett was deliberately starved of resources, suffering "over a decade of CPS disinvestment and destabilization." By 2011, only 19% of students in the school's attendance area were attending Dyett, with most parents choosing to send their students to less under-resourced schools. By 2012, Dyett students were deprived of all advanced placement classes and had to take art and physical education classes online.

Dyett's dropout rate rose over the years, hitting a high of 81% during the 2009–10 school year. Despite persistent opposition from parents and community leaders arguing that CPS had set Dyett up to fail, the CPS board voted to close Dyett in 2012. The closure took place as a teach-out, with the school closing after the students who were freshmen in 2011–2012 had graduated. During this phaseout period, members of the school community protested continuously, with several Dyett supporters being arrested for refusing to leave Chicago City Hall and 36 students filing a federal civil rights complaint against CPS. In 2013 Dyett supporters organized the Coalition to Revitalize Dyett, presenting detailed plans to convert Dyett to a school focused on "global leadership and green technology." CPS nonetheless closed the school in the spring of 2015, after graduating a final class of 12 students.

=== Hunger strike and Re-opening ===
During late–August through mid–September in 2015, a group of education activists went on a hunger strike for over 19 days in an attempt to save the school, which was the only remaining open-access school serving Bronzeville. In September 2015, CPS announced that the school would open again as Dyett High School For The Arts, an open enrollment arts-focused neighborhood high school for the 2016–17 school year. Bronzeville resident and Michele Clark Magnet High School principal Beulah McLoyd was picked by the school board to serve as principal of Dyett in October 2015. The re-envisioned school also featured an innovation lab to offer training in technology for the Bronzeville/Washington Park community and nearby schools.

== Athletics ==
Dyett competes in the Chicago Public League (CPL) and was a member of Illinois High School Association (IHSA). The school's sport teams are known as the Eagles. The boys' basketball team were regional champions five times starting in 2006–07 and were state champions in 2024-2025.

== Works cited ==
- Ewing, Eve L. (2018). Ghosts in the Schoolyard: Racism and School Closings on Chicago's South Side. University of Chicago Press. ISBN 9780226526027.

== Notable alumni ==
- Chief Keef (attended) – rapper
