= Claude McLin =

American saxophonist

Claude McLin (December 27, 1925 – July 21, 1995) was an American jazz tenor saxophonist.

== Biography ==
McLin was born in Chicago. A graduate of DuSable High School, he was in a "baby band" with Johnny Griffin and Wilbur Campbell in the spring of 1944.

Returning from military service in 1946, he led a series of combos in Chicago. He often played the Pershing Ballroom in a battle-of-the-saxes format. His dueling partners included Gene Ammons, Tom Archia, Von Freeman and, on several occasions, his idol Lester Young. His own band featured pianist Wild Bill Davis and drummer Eldridge "Bruz" Freeman in 1947 and 1948.

McLin's high visibility on the South Side club scene eventually led to recording opportunities with Aristocrat and Chess. A 1949 session was done with singer and pianist Laura Rucker while McLin's band was working at Leonard Chess's Macomba Lounge. McLin went on to make three sessions under his own name in 1950 and 1951. His rendition of "Mona Lisa" (recorded July 1950) hit the charts, but "Tennessee Waltz" (from the second session, in November 1950) did not repeat its commercial success, and his third session was left unissued at the time.

He played on the legendary unreleased jazz session for Parkway Records under the leadership of Bennie Green, and in October 1950 a live recording from the Pershing Ballroom found him subbing for Von Freeman in the company of visiting headliner Charlie Parker.

In 1952, McLin, who was having trouble finding enough engagements in Chicago to support his family, moved to Los Angeles, where for a decade his combos found steady work. He appeared on an Amos Milburn session for Aladdin Records in 1954, with Red Callender on bass. In 1958 he recorded two singles for Golden Tone with the organ trio lineup that was then coming into fashion, and two blues for Dootsie Williams' Dootone label in 1958. In 1960, he recorded a single for his own Mac-Jac label. There is also a second Claude McLin single on Mac-Jac, probably recorded three or four years later.

He also recorded at least five singles between 1960 and 1962 for a small label called Allegro.

McLin made his last recording session, for Dooto in 1964; as a sign the times were changing, he recorded a pop ballad on one side and a piece of eccentric garage rock on the other. He retired from music in the late 1960s, when popular demand for jazz had reached a low point, and worked other jobs in the Los Angeles area for the rest of his life.

He died in Los Angeles on July 21, 1995, aged 69.
