= Arville Harris =

American jazz musician

Arville Shirley Harris (1904–1954) was an American jazz reedist. He was the brother of Leroy Harris, Sr.

Harris was born in St. Louis and played on riverboats in the early 1920s. He worked in the bands of Hershal Brassfield and Bill Brown, then worked with Clarence Williams, including on recordings, late in the decade. Around the same time he recorded with Fats Waller, King Oliver, Eva Taylor, and Sara Martin. He played in Cab Calloway's group, including on tours of Europe, between 1931 and 1935. In the latter half of the 1930s he worked with Jacques Butler, Baron Lee, and Claude Hopkins. He led a band under his name in New York at the Majestic Ballroom from ca. 1944 until his death.
