= Milt Larkin =

American jazz trumpeter, bandleader, and singer (1910–1996)

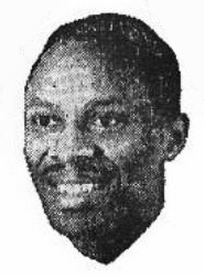
Milton Larkin c. 1943

Milt Larkin (October 10, 1910, Navasota, Texas – August 31, 1996) was an American jazz trumpeter, bandleader and singer.

== Biography ==
=== Early career ===
Larkin was an autodidact on the trumpet, and got his start playing in Texas in the 1930s with Chester Boone and Giles Mitchell. Between 1936 and 1943 he led his own band, touring the southwest United States, with gigs in Kansas City, and at the Apollo Theater in New York City, as well as a 9-month residency at the Rhumboogie Café in Chicago, on occasions coinciding there with, and backing, T-Bone Walker.

Personnel in the band included Arnett Cobb and Illinois Jacquet (both of whom went on to join Lionel Hampton), Eddie Vinson (who left to join Cootie Williams), Tom Archia, Cedric Haywood, Wild Bill Davis, Alvin Burroughs, Joe Marshall and Roy Porter. Vinson and Cobb had been with the band since its creation at the Aragon Ballroom in Houston in 1936. This ensemble won high praise but never recorded, on the one hand, because of the "recording ban" imposed on August 1, 1942, just after the band arrived in Chicago, and on the other hand, because Larkin wouldn't accept the low wages that record companies offered to black musicians.

Having already lost several members to the draft board, Larkin disbanded the group when he himself entered the Army. From 1943 to 1946, he played in Sy Oliver's army band, also playing on trombone. Larkin first recorded after leaving the service, recording with a number of ensembles over the next decade. In 1956, he moved to New York and led a septet at the Celebrity Club. In the 1970s he returned to Houston and retired.

=== Later career ===
From 1979 to 1994, Milt Larkin was the leader of the Milt Larkin Allstars and the founder of Get Involved Now, a non-profit group that served inhouse audiences in Houston, Texas. Members of his group included Jimmy Ford [alto sax], Arnett Cobb [tenor sax], Basirah Dean [piano/keyboard], Clayton Dyess [guitar], Terry T. Thomas [bass], and Richard Waters [drums] as well as. many other musicians who sat in his big band, including Buddy Tate. He did hundreds of performances for crippled and burned children, special needs children, mentally ill patients and elderly audiences. He was the recipient of the Jefferson Award for community service and performed regularly on the Annual Houston Jazz Festival and the Annual Juneteenth Blues Festival in Houston. Milt Larkin was featured in a documentary which was produced and aired on PBS called The Bigfoot Swing. Although he suffered from Alzheimer's disease in the last few years of his life, he performed flawlessly at the Milt Larkin birthday bash on October 10, 1994, for his 84th birthday. He died on August 31, 1996, of pneumonia and his funeral was attended by many musicians, politicians and members of the press.

His son, Milton "Tippy" Larkin, is also a trumpet player and played with Larkin's various bands.

== Discography ==
=== As leader ===
- Down Home Saturday Night (Copasetic, 1976)

=== As sideman ===
- Arnett Cobb, Arnett Blows for 1300 (Delmark, 1994)
