= Cedric Haywood =

American jazz pianist (1914–1969)

Cedric Haywood (December 31, 1914 – September 9, 1969) was an American jazz pianist.

Born and raised in Houston, Texas, Haywood played as a teenager in a high school band with Arnett Cobb. His first professional engagement was with Chester Boone's band in 1934, followed by an extended run with Milt Larkin (1935–42); during his tenure in the band the reed section included Illinois Jacquet, Tom Archia, and Eddie "Cleanhead" Vinson in addition to Cobb. Haywood also played with Floyd Ray and Lionel Hampton around the turn of the decade. In 1942 he played with Sidney Bechet. Toward the middle of the 1940s Haywood moved to California, served in the Army during World War II, and following this joined Saunders King in 1948.

In the 1950s Haywood worked with Illinois Jacquet, Cal Tjader, and Kid Ory, touring Europe with Ory in the middle of the decade. Early in the 1960s he played with Brew Moore, then moved back to Houston in 1963. There he played locally as a bandleader and recorded with Lightnin' Hopkins. In the late 1960s, he contributed arrangements to a big band led by Sonny Franklin; among the participants were Tom Archia and Don Wilkerson.
