= Ted Sturgis =

American jazz musician

Ted "Mohawk" Sturgis (25 April 1913 – 18 October 1995) was an American jazz bassist.

== Life and career ==
Born in Cape Charles, Virginia, Sturgis started his music studies on piano at age five. He also played alto saxophone, guitar and drums in addition to bass. He primarily played double-bass, although he played electric bass on some recordings late in life. In 1934 he moved to New York City to join Roy Eldridge and his band with whom he played in 1934-1935. Others he played with in New York included Jacques Butler (1935), Blanche Calloway (1936), Tommy Stevenson (1936–1937), and Eddie Mallory (1937–1938). He appeared on a 1943 Eldridge recording for Brunswick.

He then worked as a sideman in the 1940s with, among others, Benny Carter, Don Byas, Stuff Smith, and Louis Armstrong. He was a frequent accompanist of female singers such as Billie Holiday, Mildred Bailey, and in Earl Hines' orchestra with Sarah Vaughan.

In the 1950s and 1960s Sturgis worked extensively as a freelance musician, and played often in USO events. His credits aside from bass playing include guitar with Lester Young and drums with Stuff Smith. He recorded his last dates as a leader in 1976 but continued to play into the 1980s with Spanky Davis, eventually retiring around the end of the decade.

== Discography ==
As sideman

- Don Byas, Don Byas in Paris (Prestige, 1968)
- Benny Carter, Benny Carter 1928–1952 (RCA Victor, 1992)
- Roy Eldridge, Swing Along with Little Jazz (MCA Coral, 1974)
- Roy Eldridge, What It's All About (Pablo, 1976)
- Billie Holiday, The Golden Years (Columbia, 1967)
