= George Rhodes (musician) =

- Sammy Davis Jr. and Rhodes

Background information
- Born: October 10, 1918; Indiana
- Died: December 25, 1985 (aged 67) Los Angeles, California
- Genres: Jazz, blues, traditional pop
- Occupations: Musician, arranger, conductor, music director
- Instrument: Piano
- Years active: 1944–1985
- Labels: Apollo, RCA Victor, Groove, King

George Arthur Rhodes (October 10, 1918 (Note: Sources conflict. The birth date of 10/10/1918 has been used based on his 1954 immigration card, which is supported by the 1920 US census record listing his age as 1 3/12 years on January 13, 1920, and the US Social Security Death Index. His gravestone at Forest Lawn Memorial Park, Glendale, LA, CA also gives 1918 as his birth year. Birth year has been listed by online sources as 1919 and his age at death has been reported as 66 by his LA Times and Jet obituaries, which is inconsistent with these dates.) – December 25, 1985) was an American arranger, conductor, music director, pianist, and composer. He is most known for being Sammy Davis Jr.'s long-time music director, arranger, and conductor. Rhodes made history as a black music director by being the first to work for a major network (at NBC in 1966 for The Sammy Davis Jr. Show) and to work for a Las Vegas showroom (at the Tropicana Hotel in 1973). After being hired as a temporary pianist for Davis in 1955, Rhodes eventually became his principal arranger and conductor, working on his variety act, The Sammy Davis Jr. Show, three of Davis' television specials, two musicals starring Davis, and three albums.

== Biography ==
=== Early life ===
George Arthur Rhodes was born in Indiana on October 10, 1918 to Margaret and James Rhodes. However, he moved to Chicago, Illinois and it is often credited as his hometown.

=== Career ===
Rhodes began his career in Chicago as a pianist for the blues singer Lil Green in 1944. He continued to play piano for other black artists, such as the jazz musicians Red Allen, J. C. Higginbotham, and Arnett Cobb. While playing in Cobb's band, Rhodes moved to New York, where he was a piano student at the Juilliard School. While in New York City in the 1950s, he started his work as an arranger for a string of record labels: Apollo Records (from 1950 to 1952), RCA Victor (1954 to 1955), and King Records (from 1955 to 1956). Rhodes also continued playing piano with jazz musicians such as Jonah Jones.

In 1955, Sammy Davis Jr., while in New York to star in the musical Mr. Wonderful, hired Rhodes as pianist in the band of his variety act, the Will Mastin Trio, which was then led by Morty Stevens, an arranger, conductor and pianist, himself. As Stevens began gaining independent success as a composer, Rhodes took over more responsibility as bandleader, eventually replacing Stevens as principal arranger and conductor when he left the act to work for CBS. Rhodes would continue working for Davis for 30 years, until his death in 1985. In addition to their strong professional relationship, Rhodes also quickly became a good friend of Davis and they remained close for the rest of his life.

In the 1960s, Rhodes served as music director for many of Sammy Davis Jr.'s projects. In 1965, he returned to Broadway with Davis as conductor for the musical Golden Boy, for which Davis was nominated for the Tony Award for Best Actor in a Musical. Rhodes became the first black music director to work for a major television network when he was conductor-arranger of The Sammy Davis Jr. Show for NBC in 1966. In the same year, he also was music director for "The Swinging World of Sammy Davis Jr.," a television variety special which was nominated for the Primetime Emmy for Outstanding Variety Special.

In 1972, George Rhodes and his band accompanied Sammy Davis Jr to Vietnam to perform in USO show for American soldiers in various parts of the country. Besides Rhodes and Sammy Davis Jr, Lynn Kellogg, Ted Barret and several chorus girls performed for the GIs.

Rhodes again broke barriers in 1973 by becoming the first black music director of a Las Vegas showroom when he was hired by the Tropicana Hotel. This was precipitated by Sammy Davis Jr. becoming a director of the hotel (the first black director of a Las Vegas casino), at which he would also be performing.

In 1978, Rhodes was set to conduct the orchestra during Davis' return to Broadway in the revival of Stop the World - I Want to Get Off as he had for Golden Boy, but was dismissed during previews in San Diego. It was reported that the producers had agreed to Davis' request for Rhodes to conduct only to placate him, but did not think Rhodes would be up to the job and instead wanted to use Ian Fraser, the arranger and music supervisor of the original 1961 production. However, upon finding out, Davis refused to continue in the production until he was reinstated, saying later "I told them I couldn't perform. It's like losing my family." The production team were forced to re-sign Rhodes as conductor/music director for the three week Broadway run.

=== Personal life ===
In 1958, Rhodes married Shirley Anne Vest, who became a manager for Sammy Davis Jr. They remained married until his death in 1985, and she described him as "a good, kind, gentle man." The couple had five children: George Jr., Shirley, Andrea, Gregory, and Eygie (Andrea and Gregory were children off Doris Jean Randolph and George Rhodes).

He had a strong lifelong friendship with Sammy Davis Jr. who often referred to him as family. In response to his passing, Davis said "He was my brother on and off the stage, and no one can ever replace him in either area of my life."

=== Death ===
At the age of 67 Rhodes died of a heart attack in his sleep at his Los Angeles home early in the morning of December 25, 1985. Shirley reported that he had not been ill, and that the doctor who pronounced him dead said he "had no pain."

== Discography ==
=== As leader ===
- Real George (Groove, 1956)
- Porgy and Bess (AAMCO, 1959)
- Rock, Rock, Rock (AAMCO, 1959)

=== As sideman ===
- Arnett Cobb, Arnett Blows for 1300 (Delmark, 1994)
- Jonah Jones, Jonah Jones at the Embers (Groove, 1956)
- Jonah Jones, Muted Jazz (Capitol, 1957)
- Sammy Davis Jr., I Gotta Right to Swing (Brunswick, 1960)
- Sammy Davis Jr., That's All! (Reprise, 1967)
