= George Dixon (trumpeter) =

American jazz musician

- Born: April 8, 1909; New Orleans, Louisiana, U.S.
- Died: August 1, 1994 (aged 85); Chicago, Illinois, U.S.
- Genres: Jazz
- Instrument(s): Trumpet, alto saxophone

George Dixon (April 8, 1909 – August 1, 1994) was an American jazz trumpeter and multi-instrumentalist.

== Early life ==
Born in New Orleans, Dixon moved often as a child with his father, a minister who toured the American South. He began playing violin at age 13 while living in Natchez, Mississippi, and studied the instrument at Arkansas State College, where he also picked up alto saxophone.

== Career ==
Dixon moved to Chicago in 1926, where he played with Sammy Stewart from 1928, including on a tour of New York City in 1930. Dixon then worked with Earl Hines throughout the decade of the 1930s. He led a United States Navy band in Memphis, Tennessee, during World War II, then played in Chicago with Floyd Campbell, Ted Eggleston, and others. He led his own band at the Circle Inn in the 1940s and early 1950s.

Around mid-1950s, Dixon stopped playing full-time, though he continued to play occasionally until his death in 1994.
