= Marl Young =

American musician (1917–2009)

- Born: January 29, 1917; Bluefield, Virginia, U.S.
- Died: April 29, 2009 (aged 92) Los Angeles, California, U.S.
- Occupations: Musician; arranger
- Instrument: Piano
- Years active: 1940s–2000s

Marl Young (January 29, 1917 – April 29, 2009) was an American musician and arranger who helped with the merger of the all-black and all-white musicians unions in Los Angeles in the early 1950s. He later became the first black music director of a major network television series, Here's Lucy, starring Lucille Ball.

== Biography ==
Young was born in Bluefield, Virginia, spending the first seven years of his life there before moving to Chicago with his family. He had begun playing the piano by age six.

In 1947, he went to Los Angeles, where he became involved with the black musicians union, and in the early 1950s, was instrumental in the merging of the all-black and all-white musicians unions in Los Angeles. Music scholar Steven Isoardi describes him as "one of the key figures in moving from segregated unions into an integrated American Federation of Musicians".

After first connecting with Lucille Ball and Desilu Productions in 1958, Young went on to become the first black musical director of a major network television series, Here's Lucy, and his working relationship with Ball would span 16 years.

Young, who had prostate cancer, died in Los Angeles at the age of 92.

== See also ==
- West Coast jazz
