= Red Saunders (musician) =

American drummer

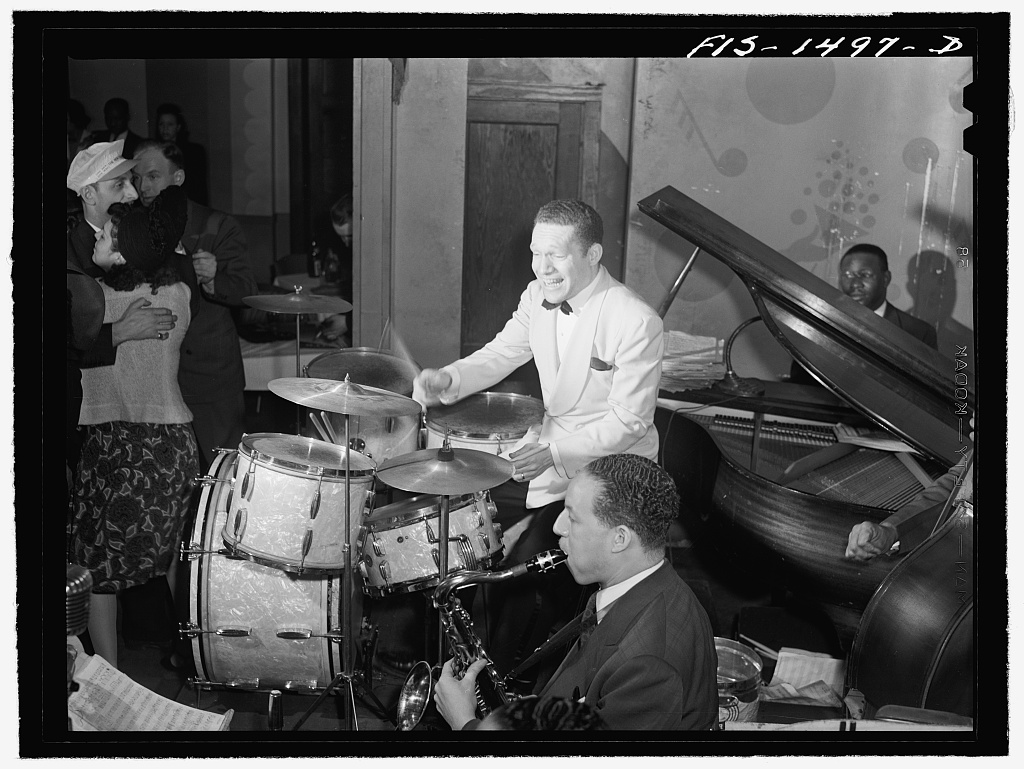
- "Red" Saunders, drummer, and his band, at the Club DeLisa, Chicago, Illinois

Background information
- Born: Theodore Dudley Saunders; March 2, 1912; Memphis, Tennessee, United States
- Died: March 5, 1981 (aged 69) Chicago, Illinois, United States
- Genres: Jazz, rhythm and blues
- Instrument: Drums
- Years active: 1928–1970s

Theodore Dudley "Red" Saunders (March 2, 1912 – March 5, 1981) was an American jazz drummer and bandleader. He also played vibraphone and timpani.

== Life and career ==
Saunders was born in Memphis, Tennessee, and after his mother's death moved to Chicago with his sister. He took drum lessons while attending a boarding school in Milwaukee, received a music scholarship to the University of Texas, and became a professional musician in 1928, playing in Stomp King's band. He then spent several years touring the country as drummer with Ira Coffey's Walkathonians, a band that played at competitive walkathon events, before joining a revue, Curtis Mosby's Harlem Scandals. On returning to Chicago in 1934, he joined a band led by Tiny Parham at the Savoy Ballroom, and thereafter became a well-known drummer in Chicago clubs and hotels. In 1937, Saunders joined the house band at the Club DeLisa, initially led by pianist Albert Ammons, and then briefly by saxophonist Delbert Bright, before taking over as bandleader himself.

Saunders remained in control of the Club DeLisa house band, playing four to six shows nightly, until the club closed in 1958, apart from a hiatus between 1945 and 1947 when he led a smaller band at other venues in Chicago and Indianapolis. Among his sidemen were Leon Washington, Porter Kilbert, Earl Washington, Sonny Cohn, Ike Perkins, Riley Hampton, singer Joe Williams and Mac Easton. Among the arrangers he employed were Johnny Pate and Sun Ra.

Saunders made his first recordings as bandleader for Savoy Records in late 1945, and later accompanied such rhythm and bluesperformers as T-Bone Walker, Big Joe Turner, Sugar Chile Robinson, Rosetta Tharpe, Willie Mabon, Little Brother Montgomery and LaVern Baker (then credited as "Miss Sharecropper") on sessions. He continued to record under his own name with relatively little commercial success for several years, until early 1952 when his recording of the traditional children's song "Hambone" on the OKeh label, with Dolores Hawkins and the Hambone Kids (who included Dee Clark), reached some R&B charts. In 1956, he recorded with Guy Warren on Warren's album Africa Speaks—America Answers! Despite his regular gig schedule and his disinclination to go on the road, Saunders also played with Duke Ellington, Louis Armstrong, and Woody Herman. He continued to lead a band at the Regal Theater in Chicago into the 1960s, and played with Little Brother Montgomery and Art Hodes at the New Orleans Jazz Festival in the 1970s.

== Personal life ==
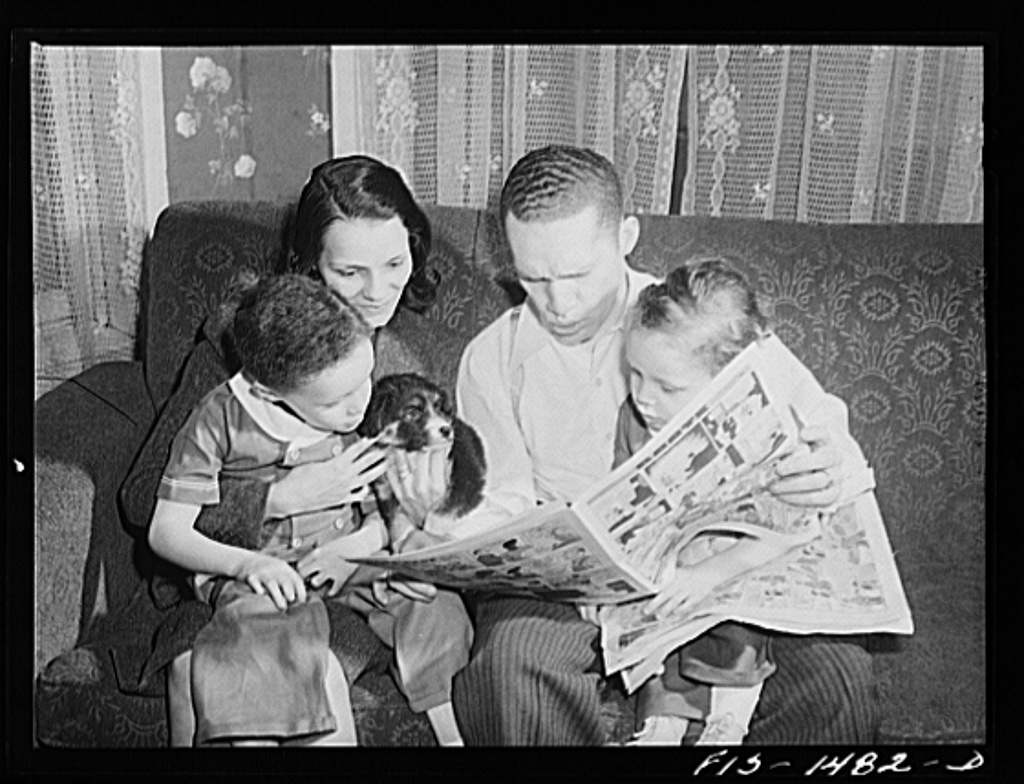
Saunders with his wife and family

Saunders's grave at Holy Sepulchre Cemetery

Saunders met his wife, Ella, when she was working as a chorus girl and they were playing the same show in California. Saunders and his wife and their two children were the subject of a series of photographs taken in Chicago by Security Administration photographer Jack Delano in April 1942 where their last name was mistakenly transcribed as "Sounders."

Saunders died in Chicago in 1981, aged 69, and was buried at Holy Sepulchre Cemetery in Alsip.
