= Two Tenors =

Studio album by John Coltrane and Hank Mobley
- Released: 1969
- Recorded: May 7, 1956
- Genre: Hard bop
- Label: Prestige Records
- Producer: Bob Weinstock

Professional ratings
Review scores
Source	Rating
The Rolling Stone Jazz Record Guide	3/5 stars

Two Tenors is an album credited to jazz musicians John Coltrane and Hank Mobley, released in 1969 on Prestige Records, catalogue 7670. It is a reissue of Prestige 7043 Informal Jazz by Elmo Hope, released in 1956.

== Background ==
The album Informal Jazz, released in late 1956 on Prestige Records (PRLP 7043), was a hard bop session led by pianist Elmo Hope. Recorded on May 7, 1956, at Rudy Van Gelder’s studio in Hackensack, New Jersey, the sextet captured the vibrant interplay typical of mid‑1950s New York jazz. Van Gelder’s engineering, noted for its clarity and balance, became a defining feature of Prestige recordings.

Tenor saxophonists John Coltrane and Hank Mobley contributed as uncredited sidemen. Coltrane, who had joined the Miles Davis Quintet in late 1955, was freelancing. Mobley was cementing his role in the hard bop movement after work with Max Roach’s quintet.

== Track listing ==
1. "Weeja" (Elmo Hope) — 11:00
2. "Polka Dots and Moonbeams" (Jimmy Van Heusen, Johnny Burke) — 8:31
3. "On It" (Elmo Hope) — 8:58
4. "Avalon" (Al Jolson, Buddy DeSylva, Vincent Rose) — 9:37

== Personnel ==
- Elmo Hope — piano
- Donald Byrd — trumpet
- John Coltrane, Hank Mobley — tenor saxophone
- Paul Chambers — bass
- Philly Joe Jones — drums
