= Memorial Album =

Memorial Album may refer to:

- Memorial Album (Johnny Ace album)
- Memorial Album (Hank Williams album)
- Memorial (Clifford Brown album)
  - Memorial Album (Clifford Brown album)
- Ritchie Valens Memorial Album
- Memorial Album (Bunny Berigan album)
- The Kenny Dorham Memorial Album
- The Eddie Cochran Memorial Album

== See also ==
- Memorial Collection, 2009 compilation album of Buddy Holly
- Memorial (Distorted album)
- Memorial (Russian Circles album)
- Memorial (Moonspell album)
