= Philly Mignon =

Studio album by Philly Joe Jones
- Released: 1978
- Recorded: November 29–30 and December 1, 1977
- Studio: Fantasy Studios, Berkeley, CA
- Genre: Jazz
- Label: Galaxy; GXY-5112
- Producer: Ed Michel

Philly Joe Jones chronology
Mean What You Say (1977)	Philly Mignon (1978)	Advance! (1978)

Philly Mignon is an album by drummer Philly Joe Jones, recorded in 1977 and released on the Galaxy label.

== Reception ==
Professional ratings
Review scores
Source	Rating
AllMusic	4/5 stars
The Penguin Guide to Jazz Recordings	3/4 stars

The Bay State Banner wrote: "Philly Joe, still a brilliant soloist, is content on this one to set the tempos, add supporting rhythms and fuel the show. The mood is relaxed and the top playing on the piece belongs to Dexter Gordon—who also seems to exert more effort and energy away from his home base (Columbia)—and to Nat Adderly, who has been recording more often and showing more ability on cornet."

The AllMusic review by Scott Yanow stated: "For this Galaxy LP drummer Philly Joe Jones leads a variety of all-stars... Overall, everyone plays well on this modern hard bop set".

== Track listing ==
1. "Confirmation" (Charlie Parker) – 6:38
2. "Neptunis" (Benny Bailey) – 12:23
3. "Jim's Jewel" (Charles Bowen Jr.) – 5:10
4. "Polka Dots and Moonbeams" (Jimmy Van Heusen, Johnny Burke) – 10:28
5. "United Blues" (Ron Carter) – 5:41

== Personnel ==
- Philly Joe Jones – drums
- Nat Adderley – cornet (tracks 1, 3 & 5)
- Dexter Gordon – tenor saxophone (tracks 2 & 4)
- Ira Sullivan – tenor saxophone, soprano saxophone (tracks 1, 3 & 5)
- George Cables – piano (tracks 1, 2 & 4)
- Ron Carter – bass
