= Round Midnight (Philly Joe Jones album) =

Live album by Philly Joe Jones
- Released: 1980
- Recorded: July 18, 1969
- Venue: Pescara Jazz, Pescara, Italy
- Genre: Jazz
- Length: 37:49
- Label: Lotus; LOP 14.073

Philly Joe Jones chronology
Philly Joe Jones (1969)	Round Midnight (1980)	Archie Shepp & Philly Joe Jones (1970)

Round Midnight is a live album by drummer Philly Joe Jones that was recorded at the Pescara Jazz Festival in 1969 and released on the Lotus label in 1980.

== Reception ==
Professional ratings
Review scores
Source	Rating
AllMusic	3/5 stars

The AllMusic review by Ron Wynn stated: "Excellent Italian set with sorely neglected Dizzy Reece on trumpet."

== Track listing ==
1. "That's Earl Brother" (Bud Powell) – 8:44
2. "It Don't Mean a Thing" (Duke Ellington) – 9:06
3. "Round Midnight" (Thelonious Monk) – 7:15
4. "Percy" (Dizzy Reece) – 12:44

== Personnel ==
- Philly Joe Jones – drums
- Dizzy Reece – trumpet
- Bent Jædig – tenor saxophone
- Larry Vuckovich – piano
- Isla Eckinger – bass
