= West Coast music =

West Coast music may refer to:

- West Coast hip-hop
- West Coast jazz
- Bakersfield sound (West Coast country)
