= Larry Vuckovich =

American jazz pianist from Yugoslavia (born 1936)

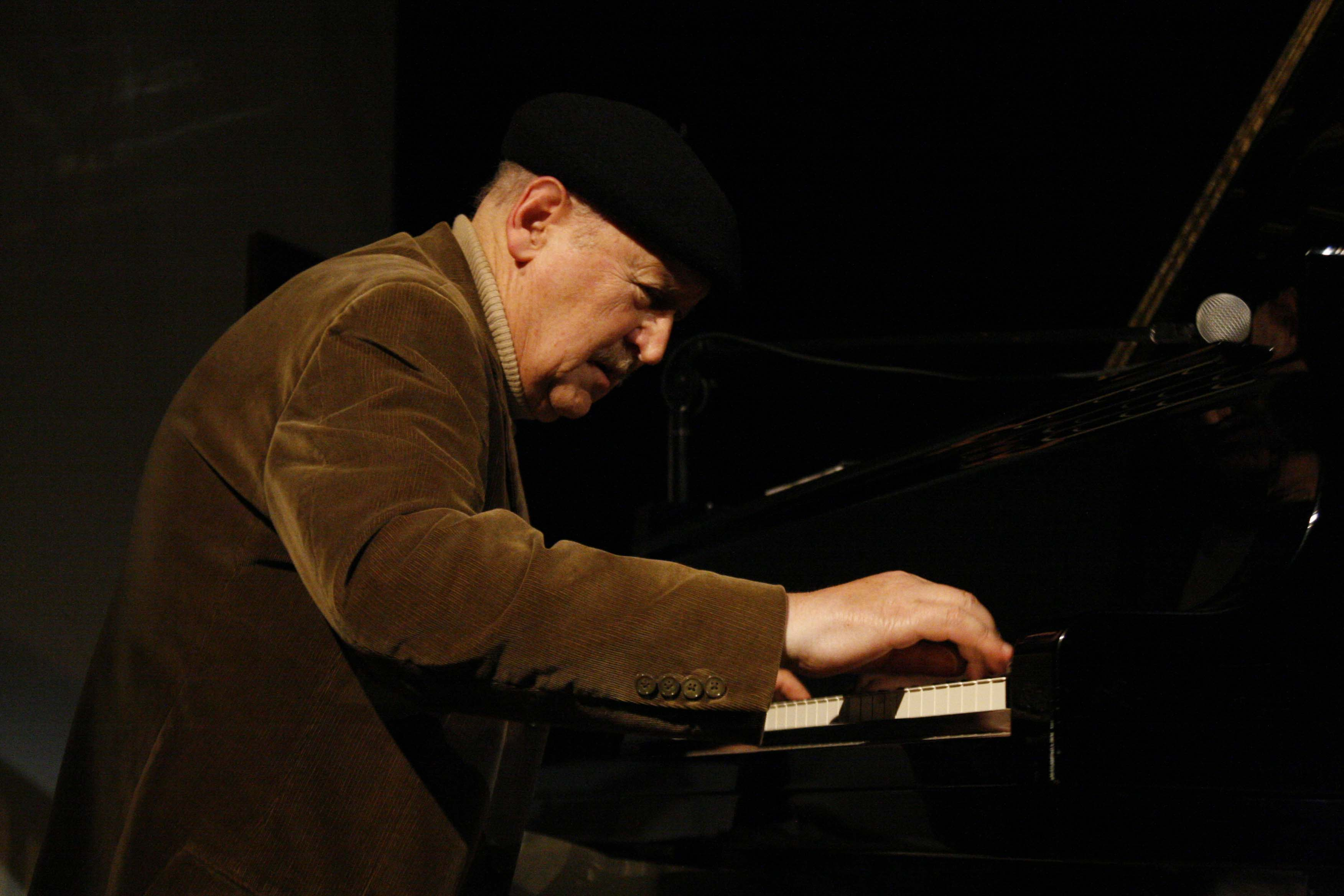

Background information
- Born: December 8, 1936; Kotor, Zeta Banovina, Kingdom of Yugoslavia
- Genres: Jazz
- Occupation: Musician
- Instrument: Piano
- Years active: 1959–present
- Labels: Inner City, Palo Alto, Tetrachord
- Website: www.larryvuckovich.com

Lazar Larry Vuckovich (Serbian Cyrillic: Лазар Лари Вучковић ; born December 8, 1936) is an American jazz pianist from Yugoslavia.

== Career ==
Born in Kotor, a small Montenegrin coastal town in the former Yugoslavia, the pianist was classically trained as a child but was also drawn to the jazz he heard on Armed Forces Radio and Voice of America during World War II and the Communist regime that followed. After the war, Tito's communists took his home, including the family piano, and imprisoned his father and brother. Jazz came to symbolize freedom. In 1951, when he was 14, his family was granted political asylum in the United States, arriving in San Francisco. The young pianist began listening to KJAZ radio, hanging out at record shops, and frequenting clubs to hear Miles Davis, John Coltrane, Dizzy Gillespie, and Bill Evans. He heard and performed with John Handy and Brew Moore with he later began his professional career. At the Black Hawk club he met Cal Tjader and Vince Guaraldi, who agreed to engage him as his only piano student. Guaraldi featured Vuckovich in a two-piano quintet, Powder Keg, and sent him to substitute as accompanist for vocalists Irene Kral and David Allyn. When Mel Tormé came to San Francisco, Vuckovich became his first-call pianist.

He began an association with Jon Hendricks that included performances in the musical Evolution of the Blues and two Hendricks recordings. He toured with Hendricks and led the house band at Domicile club in Munich, Germany. He worked with trumpeter Duško Gojković and became a member of his International Quintet, recording a live album with the band at the Domicile. He performed with drummer Philly Joe Jones at the club and toured Europe with him. He met Dexter Gordon and performed at the Montmartre jazz club in Copenhagen, Denmark. He performed at festivals at Nurnberg, Cologne, Berlin, Vienna, Bologna, Lugano, Pescara, and Ljubljana (Yugoslavia). During his Domicile residency he met his first wife. Linda was an artist who specialized in graphic design and stained-glass works. With Linda he started Tetrachord Music to publish his compositions.

Vuckovich worked with Philly Joe Jones in San Francisco at the Keystone Korner, where he was a resident pianist for five years. He played with Arnett Cobb, Buddy Tate, Charles McPherson, Leon Thomas, Scott Hamilton, and Eddie "Cleanhead" Vinson, with whom he appeared on a Savant Records album from a live Keystone recording. He has recorded for Concord, Hot House, Inner City, and Palo Alto.

Vuckovich worked for five years in New York City, where he performed at the Village Vanguard, Blue Note Jazz Club, Bradley's Zinno, West End, and Hanratty's, working with Al Cohn, Curtis Fuller, Tom Harrell, Billy Higgins, Milt Hinton, Mel Lewis, Red Mitchell, Michael Moore, and Cecil Payne. He led bands that included Walter Booker, Joshua Breakstone, Dennis Irwin, Victor Lewis, and Harvie S.

He returned to San Francisco for a long-term engagement from 1990 to 1997 as house pianist and music director of Club 36 at the Grand Hyatt Hotel. He presented several West Coast Jazz Festival performances and served as music director of the Napa Valley Jazz Festival for six years. He has performed at jazz festivals in San Francisco, Monterey and San Jose, Aspen/Sonoma Jazz Festival and the Palo Alto Jazz Alliance, as well as Yoshi's, Jazz at Pearl's, Herbst Theater, Bach Beach House, Napa Valley Opera House, Copia, and European festivals at La Teste de Buch (France), Silda (Norway), Basel (Switzerland), Belgrade (Serbia), Nisville (Serbia), Bankiya and Bansko (Bulgaria).

He performed in New York at Lincoln Center's Dizzy's Club Coca Cola and was Marian McPartland's guest on her NPR program Piano Jazz. Other performances include tours with Hadley Caliman, Julian Priester, John Heard, and Eddie Marshall. With the Napa Valley Jazz Society Vuckovich presented a tribute to Dexter Gordon. He reunited with Big Black after playing alongside him in the Jon Hendricks band during the 1960s. His teaching and clinical projects include a solo piano format of the history of jazz piano.

In December of 2018 he received the Buddy Montgomery Jazz Legacy award Jazz Pioneer Award in 2018. He was named a "Jazz Legend" at the Fillmore Jazz Heritage Center in San Francisco. Larry Vuckovich Day, December 8, was proclaimed in San Francisco on his birthday. Vuckovich received a B.A. in music at San Francisco State University, where he studied classical piano.

== Discography ==
=== As leader ===
- Blue Balkan (Inner City, 1980)
- City Sounds, Village Voices (Palo Alto, 1982)
- Cast Your Fate (Palo Alto, 1984)
- Blues for Red (Hothouse, 1985)
- Tres Palabras (Concord Jazz, 1990)
- The Good Old Days Are Right Now (Cable Car, 1992)
- Deja Vuk (Oglio, 1999)
- Young at Heart (Tetrachord Music, 2000)
- Street Scene (Tetrachord Music, 2006)
- Somethin' Special (Tetrachord Music, 2011)
- A Pair of Pianos (Quicksilver, 2013)

=== As sideman ===
- Hadley Caliman, Hadley Caliman (Mainstream, 1971)
- Cal Collins, Blues On My Mind (Concord Jazz, 1979)
- Jon Hendricks, Cloudburst (Enja, 1982)
- Jon Hendricks, Tell Me the Truth (Arista, 1975)
- Dusko Goykovich, As Simple As It Is (MPS/BASF, 1971)
- Philly Joe Jones, Round Midnight (Lotus, 1980)
- Eddie "Cleanhead" Vinson, Redux: Live at the Keystone Korner (Savant, 2003)
