= Informal Jazz =

Studio album by Elmo Hope
- Released: September or October 1956
- Recorded: May 7, 1956
- Studios: Van Gelder Studio in Hackensack, NJ
- Genre: Jazz
- Label: Prestige Records
- Producer: Bob Weinstock

Elmo Hope chronology
Hope Meets Foster (1955)	Informal Jazz (1956)	Trio and Quintet (1953-57)

Informal Jazz is an album by the jazz musician Elmo Hope, released in September or October 1956 on Prestige Records. It was reissued in 1969 under the title Two Tenors, and under the billing of Hope's sidemen for the session, John Coltrane and Hank Mobley.

== Reception ==
Professional ratings
Review scores
Source	Rating
AllMusic	3/5 stars
Disc	3/5 stars

In his review for AllMusic, critic Eugene Chadbourne praises each musician's performance individually and by track and comments on the album as a whole: "If this particular session hasn't assumed the legend of a jazz classic, it's because, on the whole, some little spark seems to be missing. If this element could be defined easily, and put into words quickly and efficiently, then record producers and musicians would know exactly how to create the perfect jam session record. The people involved in this record know much more about such a science than the average musician and record producer. These are musicians very far down the road from being average, all of this underscoring the difficulty of creating a spontaneous recording session at which moments of improvisational genius are expected to pop up."

== Track listing ==
1. "Weeja" (Elmo Hope) – 11:00
2. "Polka Dots and Moonbeams" (Jimmy Van Heusen, Johnny Burke) – 8:31
3. "On It" (Elmo Hope) – 8:58
4. "Avalon" (Al Jolson, Buddy DeSylva, Vincent Rose) – 9:37

== Personnel ==
- Elmo Hope – piano
- Donald Byrd – trumpet
- John Coltrane, Hank Mobley – tenor saxophone
- Paul Chambers – bass
- Philly Joe Jones – drums
