= List of jazz genres =

This is a list of subgenres of jazz music.

== List ==
Genre	Characteristics	Era
Acid jazz	Combined elements of soul music, funk, disco, including looping beats and modal harmony	1980s–1990s
Afro-Cuban jazz	It mixes Afro-Cuban clave-based rhythms with jazz harmonies and techniques of improvisation.	1940s ->
Avant-garde jazz	A style of music and improvisation that combines avant-garde art music and composition with jazz. It originated in the 1950s and developed through the 1960s.	1950s ->
Bebop	Bebop or bop is a style of jazz characterized by a fast tempo, instrumental virtuosity, and improvisation based on a combination of harmonic structure and occasional references to the melody.	1940s ->
Big band	Big band is a type of musical ensemble, in essence a jazz orchestra, that typically consists of at least ten musicians and four sections.	1910s ->
British dance band	British dance band is a genre of popular jazz and dance music that developed in British dance halls and hotel ballrooms during the 1920s and 1930s.	1920s ->
Cape jazz	Cape jazz (more often written Cape Jazz) is a genre of jazz that is performed in the southernmost part of Africa, the name being a reference to Cape Town, South Africa.	1990s ->
Chamber jazz	Chamber jazz is a genre of jazz involving small, acoustic-based ensembles where group interplay is important.	1960s ->
Continental jazz	Early jazz dance bands of Europe in the swing medium, to the exclusion of Great Britain.	
Cool jazz	Contrasts with the hard, fast sound of bebop. A more relaxed, subdued style, with more formal arrangements and elements of swing and classical.	1940s–1960s
Crossover jazz	Artists mix different styles of music into jazz.	1970s ->
Dixieland	Dixieland music or New Orleans jazz, sometimes referred to as hot jazz or early jazz, is a style of jazz music which developed in New Orleans at the start of the 20th century. Stylistically, it is essentially a form of Ragtime typically transposed for brass band, banjo or clarinet.	1900s ->
Electro swing	Modern interpretation of swing merged with EDM. Performances typically include both a live band and a DJ.	1990s ->
Ethio-jazz	A specific form of jazz that evolved in Ethiopia in the likes of the music of Mulatu Astatke, also referred to as the King of Ethio-jazz.	1950s ->
Ethno jazz	Ethno jazz, a form of ethno music, is sometimes equaled to world music or is regarded as its successor, particularly before the 1990s. An independent meaning of "ethno jazz" emerged around 1990.	1990s ->
European free jazz	European free jazz is a part of the global free jazz scene with its own development and characteristics.	1960s ->
Flamenco jazz	Flamenco jazz is a style mixing flamenco and jazz, typified by artists such as Paco de Lucia and Camarón de la Isla.	1960s ->
Free funk	A combination of avant-garde jazz with funk music	1970s ->
Free jazz	Free improvisation is improvised music without any specific rules. By itself, free improvisation can be any genre, it isn't necessarily jazz. Free jazz musicians make use of free improvisation to alter, extend, or break down jazz convention, often by discarding fixed chord changes, tempos, melodies, or phrases. Ornette Coleman was an early and noted advocate of this style.	1950s ->
Gypsy jazz	A style of jazz music often said to have been started by guitarist Jean "Django" Reinhardt in the 1930s. The style was originally called "hot club" or "hot jazz" and served an acoustic European interpretation of swing. The term "gypsy jazz" didn't appear until after the 1970s, when Sinti people adapted their folk music to emulate that of Django's.	1930s/1970s->
Hard bop	Incorporated influences from rhythm and blues, gospel music, and blues, especially in saxophone and piano playing.	1950s ->
Indo jazz	Fusion of jazz with Indian music (see also Sitar in jazz and Jazz in India).	1950s ->
Jazz blues	Although not a distinct style, this is typically used to refer to songs that include idiomatic "jazz" embellishments to the standard form, such as the use of extended harmony and chord substitutions. At a minimum, jazz blues usually include a ii–V progression in place of the simple V chord and a I–VI/vi–ii–V turnaround at the end of the form.	
Jazz-funk	Jazz-funk is a subgenre of jazz music characterized by a strong back beat (groove), electrified sounds, and an early prevalence of analog synthesizers.	1970s ->
Jazz fusion	Combines elements of jazz, funk, and rock. Characterized by electronic instruments, riffs, and extended solos.	1970s ->
Jazz poetry		1920s ->
Jazz pop		
Jazz rap	Jazz rap combines elements of Jazz and hip-hop. Taking hip-hop elements such as the rhythmic beats, sampling, and delivery. It is often structured as hip-hop beats on top of a jazz sample, with lyrics that often contain political, philosophical, conscious, abstract, and/or vivid imagery. Jazz-rap peaked in the mid-1980s to 2000s, with many connoisseurs often titling that era as the golden age of hip-hop. Artist groups like A Tribe Called Quest, Souls of Mischief, and De La Soul; and names such as MF Doom, Kendrick Lamar, and MIKE; and producers such as J Dilla, Nujabes, and the Alchemist are well-known jazz rap names.	
Jazz rock	The term "jazz-rock" (or "jazz/rock") is often used as a synonym for the term "jazz fusion".	1960s ->
Jump blues		1930s ->
Kansas City jazz	Kansas City jazz is a style of jazz that developed in Kansas City, Missouri and the surrounding Kansas City Metropolitan Area during the 1930s	1930s ->
Latin jazz	Draws heavily on salsa and merengue influences. Heavy use of percussion, including congas, timbales, bongos, guiros, and others.	
M-Base		1980s ->
Marabi		1920s–1930s
Mainstream jazz	A genre of jazz music that was first used in reference to the playing styles around the 1950s	1950s ->
Modal jazz	Modal jazz, as pioneered by Miles Davis, among others, is characterized by the use of modes, such as dorian modes, as the primary organizing element.	1950s ->
Neo-bop jazz	Neo-bop jazz, notably associated with Wynton Marsalis, is a comparatively accessible, "retro" genre that emerged in the 1980s as a stylistic reaction against free jazz and jazz fusion.	1980s ->
Neo-swing	The name given to the renewed interest in swing music from the 1930s and 40s. Many neo-swing bands practiced contemporary fusions of swing, jazz, and jump blues with rock, punk rock, ska, and ska punk music or had roots in punk, ska, ska punk, and alternative rock music.	1990s ->
Jazz noir	A form of slow or erratic contemporary jazz. Also known as "doom jazz" or "dark jazz", it is noted for its often somber, mysterious or even sinister tone. It takes inspiration from film noir soundtracks and dark ambient music.	1990s ->
Nu jazz	Music that blends jazz elements with other musical styles, such as funk, soul, electronic dance music, and free improvisation.	1990s ->
Orchestral jazz	Also known as "Symphonic Jazz"	1920s ->
Post-bop	A genre of small-combo jazz that assimilates hard bop, modal jazz, avant-garde and free jazz without necessarily being immediately identifiable as any of those forms	1960s ->
Punk jazz	The amalgamation of elements of the jazz tradition (usually free jazz and jazz fusion of the 1960s and 1970s) with the instrumentation or conceptual heritage of punk rock	1970s ->
Ragtime		1890s ->
Samba-jazz		1950s ->
Ska jazz	Music derived by fusing the melodic content of jazz with the rhythmic and harmonic content of early Jamaican Music introduced by the "Fathers of Ska" in the late 1950s. It is sometimes considered a subgenre of Third-Wave Ska.	1960s ->
Skiffle		1950s ->
Smooth jazz	In general a smooth jazz track is downtempo (the most widely played tracks are in the 90–105 BPM range), layering a lead, melody-playing instrument (saxophones – especially soprano and tenor – are the most popular, with guitars a close second) over a backdrop that typically consists of programmed rhythms and various synth pads or samples.	1960s ->
Soul jazz	Draws heavy influences from hard bop, blues, gospel, and rhythm and blues. It is often characterized by organ trios.	1950s ->
Spiritual jazz		1960s ->
Straight-ahead jazz	A form of Jazz created in the 1960s with roots from the previous two decades. It omits elements from rock music and free jazz that began to appear in this period, instead putting more emphasis on acoustic instruments and a more conventional sound.	1960s ->
Stride jazz	A style of jazz piano which incorporates left hand techniques from ragtime music, except the left hand spans a greater distance on the keyboard.	1920s ->
Swing	Big band arrangements, always swung. Pioneered by Duke Ellington, Count Basie, and Benny Goodman.	1930s–1950s
Third stream	The fusion of the jazz stream and classical stream.	1950s ->
Trad jazz	Short for "traditional jazz", refers to the Dixieland and ragtime jazz styles of the early 20th century	
West Coast jazz	A less frenetic, calmer style than hard bop, heavily arranged, and more often compositionally based subgenre of cool jazz.	1950s–60s
