= John Ore =

American jazz musician

John Ore (December 17, 1933 – August 22, 2014) was an American jazz bassist.

Ore attended the New School of Music in Philadelphia from 1943 to 1946, studying cello and followed this with studies on bass at Juilliard.

In the 1950s he worked with Tiny Grimes, George Wallington, Lester Young, Ben Webster, Coleman Hawkins, Elmo Hope, Bud Powell and Freddie Redd. From 1960 to 1963 he played in Thelonious Monk's quartet, and then with the Les Double Six of Paris in 1964. Later in the 1960s he played again with Powell and also recorded with Teddy Wilson. In the 1970s he worked with Earl Hines. He was with the Sun Ra Arkestra in 1982. He never recorded an album as a leader.

In a blindfold test with DownBeat in 1963, fellow bassist Ray Brown praised Ore's playing on an album with Monk's quartet, giving the bassist "four stars...for clean playing."

== Discography ==
With Elmo Hope

- Meditations (Prestige, 1955)
- Hope Meets Foster (Prestige, 1956)
- Last Sessions (Inner City, 1977)
- Elmo Hope Trio (RCA, 1978)
- The Final Sessions (Evidence, 1996)

With Hank Mobley

- No Room for Squares (Blue Note, 1964)
- Straight No Filter (Blue Note, 1986)

With Thelonious Monk

- Thelonious Monk at the Blackhawk (Riverside, 1960)
- Thelonious Monk in Italy (Riverside, 1963)
- Monk's Dream (Columbia, 1963)
- Criss Cross (Columbia, 1963)
- Thelonious Monk in Europe Vol. 1 (Riverside, 1963)
- Thelonious Monk in Europe Vol. 2 (Riverside, 1964)
- Thelonious Monk in Europe Vol. 3 (Riverside, 1964)
- Monk in France (Riverside, 1965)
- Two Hours with Thelonious (Riverside, 1969)
- In Person (Milestone, 1976)
- Always Know (Columbia, 1979)
- April in Paris/Live (Milestone, 1981)
- The Thelonious Monk Memorial Album (Milestone, 1982)
- Evidence (Milestone, 1983)
- Blues Five Spot (Milestone, 1984)
- European Tour (Denon/LRC, 1985)
- Live! at the Village Gate (Xanadu, 1985)
- The First European Concert '61 (Magnetic, 1988)
- Live at Monterey Jazz Festival 1963 Volume 1 (Jazz Unlimited 1993)

With Cecil Payne

- Cerupa (Delmark, 1995)
- Scotch and Milk (Delmark, 1997)

With Bud Powell

- The Return of Bud Powell (Roulette, 1964)
- Simply Amazing!! (Accord, 1982)
- Bud Powell Vol. 2 (Jazz Reactivation, 1983)

With Sun Ra

- Art Forms of Dimensions Tomorrow (El Saturn, 1965)
- Just Friends (El Saturn, 1983)
- Blue Delight (A&M, 1989)
- Purple Night (A&M, 1990)
- Cosmic Tones for Mental Therapy/Art Forms of Dimensions Tomorrow (Evidence, 1992)
- At the Village Vanguard (Rounder, 1993)
- Friendly Galaxy (Leo, 1993)
- Pleiades (Leo, 1993)
- Somewhere Else (Rounder, 1993)

With Freddie Redd

- Introducing Freddie Redd (Prestige, 1955)
- Freddie Redd in Sweden (Baybride, 1973)

With Charles Tyler

- Saga of the Outlaws (Nessa, 1978)
- Folk and Mystery Stories (Sonet, 1980)

With Lester Young

- It Don't Mean a Thing (If It Ain't Got That Swing) (Verve, 1957)
- Mean to Me (Verve, 1980)

With others

- Eric Alexander, Up, Over & Out (Delmark, 1995)
- Billy Bang with Sun Ra, John Ore, Andrew Cyrille, A Tribute to Stuff Smith (Soul Note, 1993)
- Earl Hines and Marva Josie, Jazz Is His Old Lady...and My Old Man (Catalyst, 1977)
- Steve Lacy, The Straight Horn of Steve Lacy (Candid, 1962)
- Freddie Redd/Hampton Hawes, Piano: East/West (Prestige, 1956)
