= Homecoming! =

Studio album by Elmo Hope
- Released: 1961
- Recorded: June 22 & 29, 1961
- Studio: Bell Sound (New York City)
- Genre: Jazz
- Length: 51:00; CD reissue with bonus tracks
- Label: Riverside; RLP 381
- Producer: Bill Grauer

Elmo Hope chronology
| High Hope! (1961) | Homecoming! (1961) | Hope-Full (1962) |

Homecoming! is an album by jazz pianist Elmo Hope recorded in 1961 for the Riverside label.

== Reception ==
Professional ratings
Review scores
| Source | Rating |
|---|---|
| AllMusic | 4/5 stars |
| The Penguin Guide to Jazz | 3.5/4 stars |

The AllMusic review by Brandon Burke stated "Homecoming! is a particularly high-spirited record for this stage in Hope's troubled career. Following an extended stay in Los Angeles, a number of the day's top players helped welcome a refreshed Hope back to New York on this session... Expect fine performances by all. This great hard bop record is highly recommended".

== Track listing ==
All compositions by Elmo Hope except as indicated

1. "Moe, Jr." – 5:56
2. "Moe, Jr." [alternate take] – 4:41 Bonus track on CD reissue
3. "La Berthe" – 3:14
4. "Eyes So Beautiful as Yours" – 6:33
5. "Homecoming" – 5:15
6. "One Mo' Blues" – 6:48
7. "A Kiss for My Love" – 5:33
8. "A Kiss for My Love" [alternate take] – 5:39 Bonus track on CD reissue
9. "Imagination" (Johnny Burke, Jimmy Van Heusen) – 6:43

== Personnel ==
- Elmo Hope – piano
- Blue Mitchell – trumpet (tracks 1, 2, 4, 7 & 8)
- Frank Foster, Jimmy Heath – tenor saxophone (tracks 1, 2, 4, 7 & 8)
- Percy Heath – bass
- Philly Joe Jones – drums
