= Trio and Quintet =

Compilation album by Elmo Hope
- Released: 1989
- Recorded: June 18, 1953, May 9, 1954 and October 31, 1957; Van Gelder Studio, Hackensack (1953-54) and Los Angeles (1957)
- Genre: Jazz
- Length: 74:32; CD reissue
- Label: Blue Note; BNP 11498
- Producer: Alfred Lion and Richard Bock

Elmo Hope chronology
Informal Jazz (1956)	Trio and Quintet (1989)	Elmo Hope Trio (1959)

Trio and Quintet is an album by jazz pianist Elmo Hope which compiles sessions recorded in 1953, originally released as a 10" LP titled Elmo Hope Trio, and 1954, originally released as a 10" LP titled Elmo Hope Quintet, Volume 2, for the Blue Note label along with a session from 1957 originally released on Pacific Jazz as part of a 1962 LP release shared with a Jazz Messengers reissue.

== Reception ==
Professional ratings
Review scores
Source	Rating
Allmusic	5/5 stars
The Penguin Guide to Jazz	4/4 stars

The Allmusic review by Stephen Cook stated "Of the collections of Elmo Hope's '50s recordings, Trio and Quintet is the one to get. It includes his prime Blue Note sessions and features a stellar cast of hard bop musicians... This Blue Note release is great not only for its cross-section of Hope compositions, but also for the many fertile ideas they've inspired in top-drawer soloists".

== Track listing ==
All compositions by Elmo Hope except as indicated

1. "It's a Lovely Day Today" (Irving Berlin) - 2:47
2. "Mo Is On" - 2:50
3. "Sweet and Lovely" (Gus Arnheim, Jules LeMare, Harry Tobias) - 2:59
4. "Happy Hour" - 2:52
5. "Hot Sauce" - 3:53
6. "Stars Over Marrakech" - 3:06
7. "Freffie" - 3:05
8. "Carvin' the Rock" (Hope, Sonny Rollins) - 2:55
9. "I Remember You" (Victor Schertzinger, Johnny Mercer, Mark Fisher) - 2:46
10. "Mo Is On" [alternate take] - 2:51
11. "Crazy" - 4:17
12. "Abdullah" - 3:48
13. "Chips" - 3:35
14. "Later for You" - 4:01
15. "Low Tide" - 4:12
16. "Maybe So" - 4:24
17. "Crazy" [alternate take] - 4:23
18. "So Nice" - 6:08
19. "St. Elmo's Fire" - 5:56
20. "Vaun Ex" - 4:45
- Recorded at Van Gelder Studion in Hackensack, New Jersey on June 18, 1953 (tracks 1–10) and May 9, 1954 (tracks 11–17) and in Los Angeles on October 31, 1957 (tracks 18–20)

== Personnel ==
- Elmo Hope - piano
- Charles Freeman Lee (tracks 11–17), Stu Williamson (tracks 18–20) - trumpet
- Frank Foster (tracks 11–17) Harold Land (tracks 18–20) - tenor saxophone
- Percy Heath (tracks 1–17), Leroy Vinnegar (tracks 18–20) - bass
- Art Blakey (tracks 11–17), Philly Joe Jones (tracks 1–10), Frank Butler (tracks 18–20) - drums
