= Meditations (Elmo Hope album) =

Studio album by Elmo Hope Trio
- Released: 1955
- Recorded: July 28, 1955; Van Gelder Studio, Hackensack, NJ
- Genre: Jazz
- Length: 42:58
- Label: Prestige; PRLP 7010
- Producer: Bob Weinstock

Elmo Hope chronology
Meditations (1955)	Hope Meets Foster (1955)

Meditations (also released as Elmo Hope Memorial Album) is an album by American jazz pianist Elmo Hope recorded in 1955 for the Prestige label.

== Reception ==
Professional ratings
Review scores
Source	Rating
Allmusic	4/5 stars
The Penguin Guide to Jazz	3.5/4 stars

The Allmusic review by Scott Yanow stated: "Fans of bop piano and Bud Powell will want this enjoyable CD reissue".

== Track listing ==
All compositions by Elmo Hope, except as indicated

1. "It's a Lovely Day Today" (Irving Berlin) - 2:56
2. "All the Things You Are" (Oscar Hammerstein II, Jerome Kern) - 3:38
3. "Quit It" - 2:53
4. "Lucky Strike" - 2:38
5. "I Don't Stand a Ghost of a Chance with You" (Bing Crosby, Ned Washington, Victor Young) - 3:22
6. "Huh" - 4:55
7. "Falling in Love with Love" (Lorenz Hart, Richard Rodgers) - 4:24
8. "My Heart Stood Still" (Hart, Rodgers) - 3:46
9. "Elmo's Fire" - 6:40
10. "I'm in the Mood for Love" (Dorothy Fields, Jimmy McHugh) - 3:22
11. "Blue Mo" - 4:24

== Personnel ==
- Elmo Hope - piano
- John Ore - bass
- Willie Jones - drums
