= The Final Sessions =

Compilation album by Elmo Hope
- Released: 1996
- Recorded: March 8 and May 9, 1966; New York City
- Genre: Jazz
- Length: 121:52; CD reissue
- Label: Evidence; ECD 22147-2

Elmo Hope chronology
| Sounds from Rikers Island (1963) | The Final Sessions (1996) |

The Final Sessions is an album by jazz pianist Elmo Hope which compiles sessions recorded in 1966, originally released as Last Sessions Volume One and Last Sessions Volume Two on the Inner City label in 1977.

== Reception ==
Professional ratings
Review scores
| Source | Rating |
|---|---|
| AllMusic | 4.5/5 stars |
| The Penguin Guide to Jazz | 3.5/4 stars |
| DownBeat | 4/5 stars |

The Allmusic review by Scott Yanow stated "Elmo Hope is in surprisingly joyous form throughout the set, sounding both original and accessible to bebop fans. Highly recommended".

== Track listing ==
All compositions by Elmo Hope except as indicated

Disc One:

1. "I Love You" (Cole Porter) – 10:50
2. "A Night in Tunisia" (Dizzy Gillespie, Frank Paparelli) – 10:16
3. "Stellations" – 4:22
4. "Pam" – 2:47
5. "Elmo's Blues" – 10:42
6. "Somebody Loves Me" (Buddy DeSylva, George Gershwin, Ballard MacDonald) – 8:42
7. "Low Tide" – 4:57
8. "Low Tide" [alternate take] – 6:32

Disc Two:

1. "Roll On" – 2:56
2. "Roll On" [alternate take] – 5:52
3. "Vi-Ann" – 6:37
4. "Vi-Ann" [alternate take] – 5:40
5. "Toothsome Threesome" – 8:52
6. "Grammy" – 8:26
7. "A Kiss for My Love" – 8:04
8. "Something for Kenny" – 6:40
9. "Punch That" – 9:37

== Personnel ==
- Elmo Hope – piano
- John Ore – bass
- Clifford Jarvis (Disc One, tracks 6–8 and Disc Two), Philly Joe Jones (Disc One, tracks 1–5) – drums
