= Hope Meets Foster =

Studio album by Elmo Hope and Frank Foster
- Released: 1955
- Recorded: October 4, 1955
- Studio: Van Gelder Studio, Hackensack
- Genre: Jazz
- Length: 38:11
- Label: Prestige; PRLP 7021
- Producer: Bob Weinstock

Elmo Hope chronology
Meditations (1955)	Hope Meets Foster (1955)	Informal Jazz (1956)

Frank Foster chronology
Here Comes Frank Foster (1953)	Hope Meets Foster (1955)	No 'Count (1956)

Hope Meets Foster is an album by jazz pianist Elmo Hope and saxophonist Frank Foster recorded in 1955 for the Prestige label.

== Reception ==
Professional ratings
Review scores
Source	Rating
Allmusic	3/5 stars
The Penguin Guide to Jazz	3/4 stars

The Allmusic review by Scott Yanow stated "nothing that innovative occurs but the music should please bop fans".

== Track listing ==
All compositions by Elmo Hope except where noted

1. "Wail, Frank, Wail" – 6:28
2. "Zarou" (Frank Foster, Hope) – 5:16
3. "Fosterity" (Foster) – 6:17
4. "Georgia on My Mind" (Hoagy Carmichael, Stuart Gorrell) – 6:41
5. "Shutout" (Foster) – 5:51
6. "Yaho" – 7:38

== Personnel ==
- Frank Foster – tenor saxophone
- Elmo Hope – piano
- John Ore – bass
- Art Taylor – drums
- Charles Freeman Lee – trumpet (tracks 2, 3 & 5)
