= Disposability =

1966 studio album by saxophonist Steve Lacy

Studio album by Steve Lacy
- Released: 1966
- Recorded: December 21–22, 1965
- Genre: Jazz
- Length: 37:46
- Label: Vik (RCA Italia)

Steve Lacy chronology
Evidence (1962)	Disposability (1966)	Sortie (1966)

Disposability is the fifth album by American jazz sxophonist Steve Lacy. It was released on the Italian RCA label in 1966, featuring three tunes written by Thelonious Monk, one by Cecil Taylor, one by Carla Bley and four by Lacy performed by Lacy, Aldo Romano and Kent Carter.

== Reception ==
The AllMusic review awarded the album 4 stars.

Professional ratings
Review scores
Source	Rating
AllMusic	4/5 stars

== Track listing ==
All compositions by Steve Lacy except as indicated

1. "Shuffle Boil" (Thelonious Monk) - 5:17
2. "Barble" - 3:25
3. "Chary" - 2:51
4. "Tune 2" (Cecil Taylor) - 8:26
5. "Pannonica" (Monk) - 3:30
6. "M's Transport" - 4:05
7. "Comin'on The Hudson" (Monk) - 3:30
8. "There We Were" - 3:02
9. "Generous 1" (Carla Bley) - 3:40
  - Recorded in Rome, December 21 and 22, 1965

== Personnel ==
- Steve Lacy – soprano saxophone
- Aldo Romano – drums
- Kent Carter – bass
