= Bertha Hope =

American jazz pianist and jazz educator (born 1936)

Bertha Hope-Booker
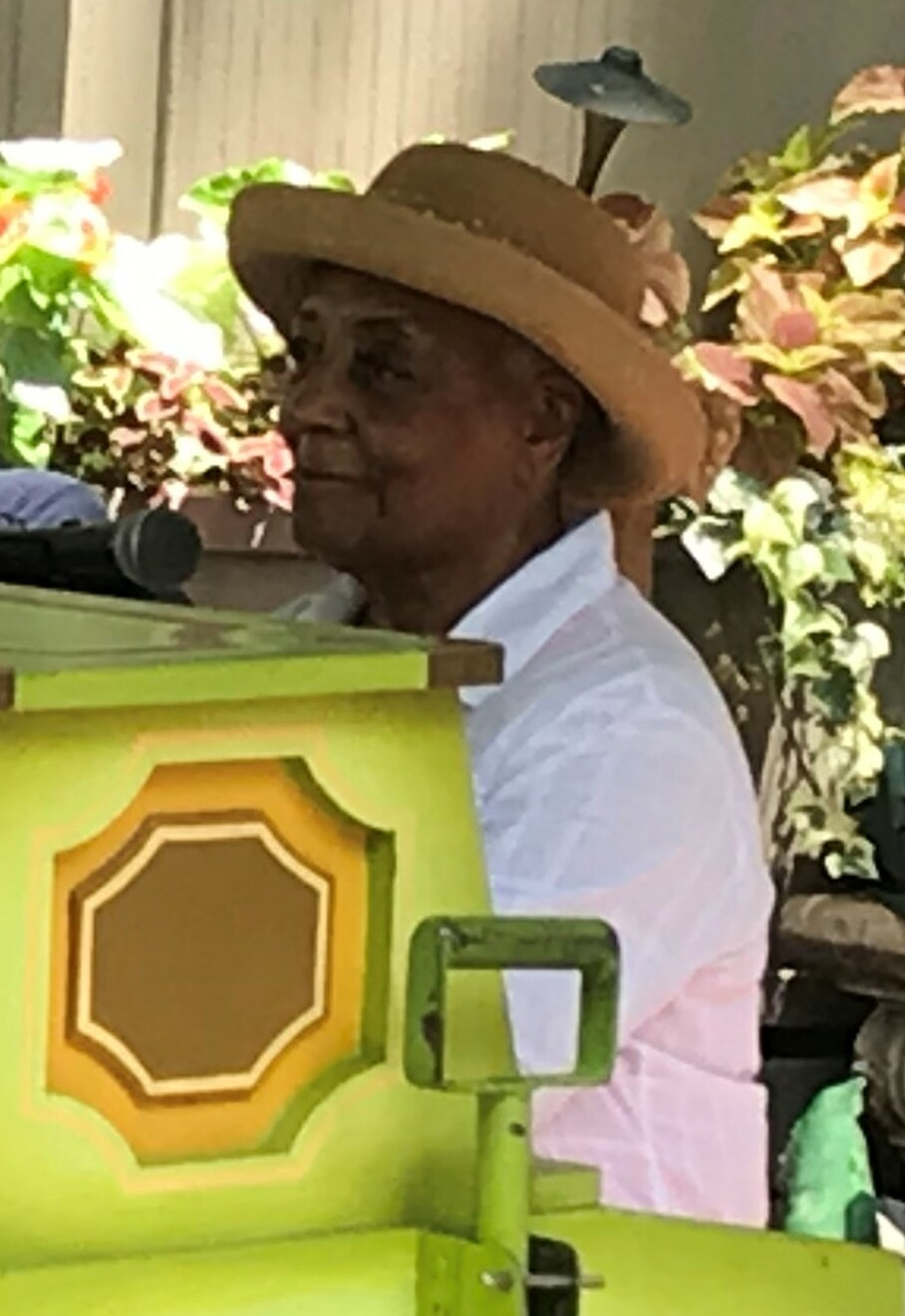
- Playing piano in Bryant Park, New York

Background information
- Born: Bertha Jean Rosemond; November 8, 1936 (age 89); Los Angeles, California, US
- Genre: Jazz
- Occupations: Musician, band leader
- Instrument: Piano

Bertha Hope-Booker (née Rosemond; born November 8, 1936, Los Angeles, California) is an American jazz pianist and jazz educator. She is the widow of fellow pianist Elmo Hope, with whom she collaborated. She has toured Europe and Japan and played with a diverse group of artists. In the 1990s, she had her first CDs as a leader and additionally worked with her second husband, bassist Walter Booker.

== Biography ==
Born Bertha Jean Rosemond in Los Angeles in 1936, Hope-Booker was the child of performing artists. Her mother, Corinne Meaux Rosemond, worked as a chorus line dancer, and her father, Clinton Rosemond, was a well known actor, as well as a stage manager and singer who had worked with Mabel Mercer and Eubie Blake. She began studying classical piano with her parents at the age of three. Her interested in jazz came from listening to Shelly Manne, Shorty Rogers and, most importantly, Bud Powell. Seeing Powell play at the Haig in the early 1950s influenced Hope-Booker's decision to play jazz herself. Hope-Booker attended Los Angeles City College where she befriended Eric Dolphy. Dolphy introduced her to Max Roach and Clifford Brown. Hope-Booker was encouraged to play by musicians such as Les McCann, Teddy Edwards and Vi Redd. For six months, Hope-Booker studied piano under Richie Powell.

Hope-Booker started playing professionally in Johnny Otis's band as well as local trios. In 1958, Hope-Booker met Elmo Hope who was touring with Sonny Rollins. Hope-Booker married Elmo in 1960 and the following year they moved to New York City. Together they recorded an album, Hope-Full, for Riverside which featured Hope-Booker on three songs. After Elmo's death in 1967, Hope-Booker gave up her music career despite being offered a place in Art Blakey's band.

== Discography ==
An asterisk (*) indicates that the year is that of release.

=== As leader ===
Year recorded	Title	Label	Notes
1990	In Search of Hope	SteepleChase	
1991	Elmo's Fire	SteepleChase	Sextet, with Eddie Henderson (trumpet), Junior Cook and Dave Riekenberg (tenor sax), Walter Booker (bass), Leroy Williams (drums)
1992	Between Two Kings	Minor	Trio, with Walter Booker (bass), Jimmy Cobb (drums)
1999	Nothin' But Love	Reservoir	Trio, with Walter Booker (bass), Jimmy Cobb (drums)

=== As sidewoman ===
Year recorded	Leader	Title	Label	Notes
1961	Elmo Hope	Hope-Full	Riverside	Duo, with Elmo Hope (piano)
2009*	Jon Irabagon	The Observer	Concord	Duo, with Jon Irabagon (tenor saxophone)
2018 (2022*)	Félix Lemerle	Blues For The End Of Time	Tzim Tzum Records	Quartet/quintet, with Félix Lemerle (guitar), Samuel Lerner (piano), Ari Roland (bass), Jimmy Cobb (drums)
