= Hope-Full =

Studio album by Elmo Hope
- Released: 1962
- Recorded: November 9 & 14, 1961; New York City
- Genre: Jazz
- Length: 39:44
- Label: Riverside; RLP 408

Elmo Hope chronology
Homecoming! (1961)	Hope-Full (1962)	Sounds from Rikers Island (1963)

Hope-Full is an album by jazz pianist Elmo Hope recorded in 1961 for the Riverside label. Hope performs 5 solo piano pieces and three piano duets with his wife Bertha.

== Reception ==
Professional ratings
Review scores
Source	Rating
AllMusic	4/5 stars
The Penguin Guide to Jazz	3/4 stars

The AllMusic review by Scott Yanow stated "solo albums by the bop musicians were considered a bit unusual, but Elmo Hope (an underrated composer and pianist) fares quite well during this Riverside set".

== Track listing ==
All compositions by Elmo Hope except as indicated

1. "Underneath" - 4:35
2. "Yesterdays" (Otto Harbach, Jerome Kern) - 5:18
3. "When Johnny Comes Marching Home" (Traditional) - 4:58
4. "Most Beautiful" - 5:03
5. "Blues Left and Right" - 6:05
6. "Liza (All the Clouds'll Roll Away)" (George Gershwin, Ira Gershwin, Gus Kahn) - 3:32
7. "My Heart Stood Still" (Lorenz Hart, Richard Rodgers) - 5:23
8. "Moonbeams" - 4:50

== Personnel ==
- Elmo Hope - piano
- Bertha Hope - piano (tracks 2, 5 & 7)
