= Yoshiaki Miyanoue =

- Born: 1953 (age 71–72); Tokyo, Japan
- Genres: Jazz
- Occupation: Guitarist
- Instrument: Guitar
- Website: www.miyanoue.net

Yoshiaki Miyanoue (born October 7, 1953 in Tokyo, Japan) is a jazz guitarist. Like Wes Montgomery, who exercised strong influence on Miyanoue, he plucks the strings with his thumb, not using a pick. He worked with organist Jimmy Smith, Dr. Lonnie Smith, drummer Philly Joe Jones, and bassist Andrew Simpkins among others.

== Discography ==
- What's Happened, Miya? (1978)
- Song for Wes (1979)
- Mellow Around (1980)
- Riviera (1981)
- Touch of Love (1981)
- Nathalie (1983)
- Dedicated to Wes Montgomery (1985)
- Foxy Eyes (1988)
- Smokin (1991)
- Bluesland (1993)
- The Thumb (1995)
- L.A. Connection (1997)
- Me, Myself & I (1999)
- Live! (2000)
- Live at the Kitty Kitty Brown (2002)
- Spirits (2006)
- Sunset Street (2007)
