= Evidence (Steve Lacy album) =

Studio album by Steve Lacy
- Released: 1962
- Recorded: November 1, 1961
- Studio: Van Gelder, Englewood Cliffs, NJ
- Genre: Jazz
- Length: 33:10
- Label: New Jazz
- Producer: Esmond Edwards

Steve Lacy chronology
The Straight Horn of Steve Lacy (1961)	Evidence (1962)	Disposability (1966)

Evidence is the fourth album by Steve Lacy, released on the New Jazz label in 1962. It features performances of four tunes written by Thelonious Monk and two from Duke Ellington by Lacy, Don Cherry, Carl Brown and Billy Higgins.

Professional ratings
Review scores
Source	Rating
AllMusic	4/5 stars
DownBeat	5/5 stars
The Penguin Guide to Jazz Recordings	3.5/4 stars
The Rolling Stone Jazz Record Guide	5/5 stars

== Reception ==
The AllMusic review by Al Campbell stated: "Soprano saxophonist Steve Lacy continued his early exploration of Thelonious Monk's compositions on this 1961 Prestige date, Evidence. Lacy worked extensively with Monk, absorbing the pianist's intricate music and adding his individualist soprano saxophone mark to it. On this date, he employs the equally impressive Don Cherry on trumpet, who was playing with the Ornette Coleman quartet at the time, drummer Billy Higgins, who played with both Coleman and Monk, and bassist Carl Brown. Cherry proved capable of playing outside the jagged lines he formulated with Coleman, being just as complementary and exciting in Monk's arena with Lacy. Out of the six tracks, four are Monk's compositions while the remaining are lesser known Ellington numbers: 'The Mystery Song' and 'Something to Live For' (co-written with Billy Strayhorn)."

== Track listing ==
1. "The Mystery Song" (Ellington, Mills) - 5:30
2. "Evidence" (Monk) - 5:00
3. "Let's Cool One" (Monk) - 6:35
4. "San Francisco Holiday" (Monk) - 5:15
5. "Something to Live For" (Ellington, Strayhorn) - 5:50
6. "Who Knows" (Monk) - 5:20

== Personnel ==
- Steve Lacy - soprano saxophone
- Don Cherry - trumpet
- Carl Brown - bass
- Billy Higgins - drums
