= High Hope! =

Studio album by Elmo Hope
- Released: 1962
- Recorded: 1961; New York City
- Genre: Jazz
- Label: Beacon; LP/BS 401

Elmo Hope chronology
Here's Hope! (1961)	High Hope! (1962)	Homecoming! (1961)

High Hope! is an album by jazz pianist Elmo Hope which was originally released on the Beacon label.

== Reception ==
Professional ratings
Review scores
Source	Rating
Allmusic	4.5/5 stars

The Allmusic review by Scott Yanow stated "it is not an essential release, but the music is quite worthwhile and enjoyable. In fact, Elmo Hope's relatively slim discography makes all of his recordings quite valuable due to his talent".

== Track listing ==
All compositions by Elmo Hope

1. "Chips" - 4:56
2. "Moe's Bluff" - 4:19
3. "Happy Hour" - 4:03
4. "Mo Is On" - 4:28
5. "Maybe So" - 4:37
6. "Crazy" - 4:15

== Personnel ==
- Elmo Hope - piano
- Paul Chambers (tracks 1–3), Butch Warren (tracks 4–6) - bass
- Granville T. Hogan (tracks 4–6) Philly Joe Jones (tracks 1–3) - drums
