= Archie Shepp & Philly Joe Jones =

Studio album by Archie Shepp & Philly Joe Jones
- Released: 1970
- Recorded: November–December 1969
- Genre: Jazz
- Label: America
- Producer: Pierre Berjot

Archie Shepp chronology
Pitchin Can (1970)	Archie Shepp & Philly Joe Jones (1970)	Archie Shepp and the Full Moon Ensemble (1970)

Philly Joe Jones chronology
Round Midnight (1970)	Archie Shepp & Philly Joe Jones (1970)	Mean What You Say (1977)

Professional ratings
Review scores
Source	Rating
Allmusic	2/5 stars
DownBeat	3/5 stars

Archie Shepp & Philly Joe Jones is an album by jazz saxophonist Archie Shepp and drummer Philly Joe Jones recorded in Europe in 1969 for the America label. The album was also issued by the Fantasy label.

== Reception ==
The Allmusic review by Scott Yanow states: "This intriguing LP does not live up to its potential... Unfortunately, both of the sidelong pieces have recitations, the performances are overly long, and there is quite a bit of rambling."

== Track listing ==
1. "The Lowlands" - 18:33
2. "Howling in the Silence: (a) Raynes Or Thunders (b) Julio's Song" - 21:40
- Recorded in Paris, France, November–December, 1969

== Personnel ==
- Archie Shepp - tenor saxophone, piano
- Philly Joe Jones - drums
- Anthony Braxton - soprano saxophone, alto saxophone
- Chicago Beau - soprano saxophone, harmonica, vocals
- Julio Finn - harmonica, vocals
- Leroy Jenkins - violin
- Earl Freeman - bass, vocals
