= Midge Williams =

American musician

- Born: Virginia Louise Williams; May 27, 1915; Oregon
- Died: January 9, 1952 (aged 36)
- Occupation: Singer
- Parent(s): John Williams; Virginia Louise Williams

Virginia Louise "Midge" Williams (May 27, 1915 – January 9, 1952) was an African-American swing and jazz vocalist during the 1930s and 1940s. Although not as famous as other jazz recording artists, Williams was a respected singer and her group, Midge Williams and Her Jazz Jesters, made several well-received recordings during the late 1930s.

== Early life ==
Williams was known by her nickname "Midge" to distinguish her from her mother, also named Virginia Louise. Her father was John Williams. Born in Oregon, she spent her early years in the African American agricultural community of Allensworth, California, United States, in Tulare County. Williams' grandfather, Joshua Singleton, was the son of the black separatist leader Benjamin "Pap" Singleton. Joshua Singleton moved his family to Allensworth when the colony was founded in 1909, and the Singletons became prominent members of the Allensworth community. Virginia Louise Williams, Midge's mother, helped run Singleton's grocery store and helped obtain a Girl Scouts of the USA charter for the Allensworth settlement.

Allensworth had problems with arsenic in the groundwater supply, and when promised new sources of water did not appear, the economic hopes of the community began to falter. Many residents had to leave, including the Williams family. Virginia moved with her children (Midge, John Lewis Jr, Charles and Robert) to Oakland in 1925, and later Berkeley, California, where she attended college for Arts and Crafts. In 1929, Virginia remarried to William Thurman and the family shared a house with her brother Henry Singleton and his family in Berkeley, California.

Midge Williams came from a talented family. Her grandfather Joshua had been a music teacher, her mother Virginia Louise was an artist, and her uncle Henry played the violin. She also had a half-brother named Lester Williams who worked as a jazz musician. Midge and her three of her brothers formed a song and dance act called the Williams Quartette. The group performed regularly in churches and theaters in and around the San Francisco – Oakland area. When they began to perform up and down the West Coast on the Fanchon and Marco circuit, their name was changed to The Williams Four.

== Professional career ==
During performances of The Williams Four in 1933, Roger Segure saw the act and signed on to be the group's manager. Segure, a pianist and arranger with experience in Asia, booked the group for engagements in China and Japan. In August 1933, The Williams Four went to Shanghai to perform at the Canidrome. While they were in Shanghai, their mother died of cervical cancer.

In 1934, in Japan, Williams made the first recordings of her career for Columbia records' Japanese division. She recorded 5 songs, including Dinah, Lazy Bones and St. Louis Blues singing in both English and Japanese.

In April 1934, The Williams Four returned to California, but shortly thereafter Midge's brother Charles died from an accidental gunshot wound in their San Francisco home. Midge took up residence in Berkeley, and in the summer of 1935 became a regular performer on the radio program Blue Monday Jamboree. In early 1936 she met Al Jolson, and sang on his Shell Chateau radio program. By the summer of 1936, Williams moved to New York City, and performed several times on Rudy Vallée's radio show. Her singing voice won her a position doing a series of twice-weekly, 15 minute sustaining programs of songs for the NBC Blue Network. In early 1937, she did a weekly series of songs for the NBC Red Network.

During her time in New York, Williams appeared on a number of other radio programs, including: the RCA Magic Key series, the Studebaker Champions Show, and Ben Bernie’s Show. In 1936 Williams began her American recording career on various record labels, and by 1937 she was recording songs with her band, Midge Williams and Her Jazz Jesters. Members of the Jazz Jesters included Raymond Scott, Frankie Newton, Buster Bailey, and Charlie Shavers. While living in New York, Williams performed at Harlem venues, including the Apollo Theater and the Savoy Ballroom. She also appeared with several other jazz musicians, including Lil Armstrong, Bunny Berigan, Harry James, John Kirby, Glenn Miller, Fats Waller, Ben Webster, and Teddy Wilson.

In 1938, Williams joined the Louis Armstrong orchestra, and toured with him across the country, although no recordings of Williams with Armstrong were made.

== Final years ==
In 1941, Williams left the Louis Armstrong orchestra and entered a Detroit hospital. She briefly returned to the band in the summer of 1943. Carrie Miller's syndicated Backstage Column reported that Midge was being "enticed to rejoin the band in the absence of Velma Middleton" and that she was booked to do Soundies.

Williams continued to make club appearances through the 1940s, primarily in New York. 1944 newspapers note her appearances at Club Jinx in Brooklyn, Club Merry-Land in upstate Buffalo, followed by Tondaleyo's Niteclub in Manhattan. She appeared at the Citizen's Christmas Cheer benefit performance on November 19, 1944, at the Renaissance Ballroom & Casino alongside Ella Fitzgerald, Savannah Churchill, June Hawkins and Mabel Hart. Columnist Ted Yates reported that Midge Williams quit Tondaleyo's Niteclub "in a huff" in early December 1944.

On April 17, 1946, she sang Cow-Cow Boogie on the Jack Webb radio show - her last known recording. From early June through October 1946, Midge appeared at Mona's 440 Club, the first lesbian bar in San Francisco. On December 16, 1950, The San Francisco Examiner reported that she had joined the revue at Shirley Corlett's Longbar Showboat and Breakfast Club on Fillmore Street. Unfortunately, the club closed three months later.

On January 9, 1952, Williams died from tuberculosis, at the age of 36. Williams was cremated and her ashes interred in San Francisco.

== Scholarly resources ==
There are few references to Midge Williams, but information about her life can be found in the following resources.

- Arnold, Bob. "A Brief Biography of "Midge" Williams." Liner Notes in The Complete Midge Williams, Vol. 1 & Vol. 2. (Audio CDs) Hollis, NH: Swing Time Records, 2001.
- Kernfeld, Barry, ed. The New Grove Dictionary of Jazz, vol. 3. London: Macmillan Publishers, Ltd., 2002.
- Larkin, Colin, ed. The Encyclopedia of Popular Music, vol. 8. London: Macmillan Reference, Ltd., 1998.
