= Memorial (Clifford Brown album) =

Studio album by Clifford Brown
- Released: 1956
- Recorded: June 11, 1953; New York City; September 15, 1953; Stockholm
- Genre: Jazz
- Length: 45:00
- Label: Prestige; PRLP 7055

Clifford Brown chronology
| Memorial Album (1956) | Memorial (1956) | The Clifford Brown Big Band in Paris (1956) |

Professional ratings
Review scores
| Source | Rating |
|---|---|
| Allmusic | link |

Memorial is a 1956 jazz album by trumpeter Clifford Brown, issued posthumously. It was originally released on the Prestige label as PRLP 7055. The album principally includes fast bop pieces, also arranged for a brass section.

Ira Gitler, who was supervising sessions for Prestige at the time, was greatly impressed by Brown: "When Brownie stood up and took his first solo on 'Philly J J', I nearly fell off my seat in the control room. The power, range and brilliance together with the warmth and invention was something that I hadn't heard since Fats Navarro."

Tracks 1–4 were recorded abroad with a Swedish All Star Group; tracks 5–9 were recorded in New York as a Tadd Dameron-led 10-inch LP minus the alternate take. Brown and Benny Golson were the only horn soloists.

== Track listing ==
1. "Stockholm Sweetnin'" (Quincy Jones) - 5:29
2. "'Scuse These Blues" (Quincy Jones) - 4:29
3. "Falling in Love with Love" (Richard Rodgers, Lorenz Hart) - 5:25
4. "Lover Come Back to Me" (Sigmund Romberg, Oscar Hammerstein II) - 5:22
5. "Philly J J" (Tadd Dameron) - 5:14
6. "Dial 'B' for Beauty" (Dameron) - 4:37
7. "Theme of No Repeat" (Dameron) - 5:23
8. "Choose Now" [#1] (Dameron) - 4:57
9. "Choose Now" [#2] (Dameron) - 3:26

Tracks 1 – 4 recorded on September 15, 1953 in Stockholm and Tracks 5 – 9 recorded on June 11, 1953 in New York City

== Personnel ==
On tracks 1–4 - (also released as Clifford Brown and Art Farmer with The Swedish All Stars)

- Clifford Brown - trumpet
- Art Farmer - trumpet
- Arne Domnerus - alto sax
- Lars Gullin - baritone sax
- Åke Persson - trombone
- Bengt Hallberg - piano
- Gunnar Johnson - double bass
- Jack Noren - drums

On tracks 5–9 - (also released as A Study In Dameronia)

- Clifford Brown - trumpet
- Benny Golson - tenor sax
- Idrees Sulieman - trumpet
- Gigi Gryce - alto sax
- Herb Mullins - trombone
- Oscar Estell - baritone sax
- Tadd Dameron - piano
- Percy Heath - bass
- Philly Joe Jones - drums

=== Production ===
- Quincy Jones - supervision (on tracks 1 – 4)
- Ira Gitler - supervision (on tracks 5 – 9)
- Doug Hawkins - engineer (on tracks 5 – 9)
