= Charles Freeman Lee =

American jazz trumpeter

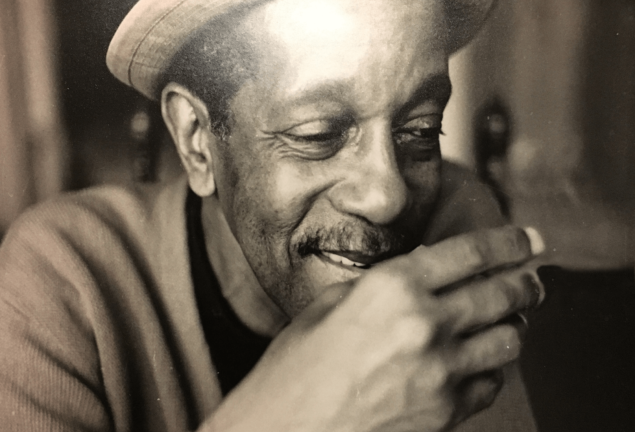
- Charles Freeman Lee in the 1980s
- Born: August 13, 1927; New York City, New York
- Died: June 15, 1997 (aged 69)
- Burial place: Xenia, Ohio
- Education: Central State University
- Occupations: Trumpeter, Science Teacher
- Parent(s): Louella Simpson Lee and Charles Henry Lee

Charles Freeman Lee, known as Freeman Lee (August 13, 1927 – June 15, 1997) was an American Jazz Trumpeter, recording with the Elmo Hope Quintet, Bennie Green, Babs Gonzales and Howard McGhee.

== Early life and education ==
Charles Freeman Lee was born in New York City, NY, to Louella Simpson Lee and Charles Henry Lee. He studied at Wilberforce University, and played with Wilberforce Collegians. He graduated from Central State University with a B.S. in Biology.

== Early career ==
In 1950 Lee played piano with Snooky Young. In 1951, Lee played trumpet with Candy Johnson. In 1952, Lee played trumpet with Sonny Stitt and Eddie "Lockjaw" Davis. In 1953 Lee performed with Joe Holiday. In 1954 and 1955 Lee freelanced in New York City. In 1956 he played with James Moody. Lee visited Ohio for a year, later returning to NYC and gigging around, including performances at the jazz club Birdland, playing both piano and trumpet. He also played with Babs Gonzales.

== Professional career ==
Lee was the trumpeter for the Elmo Hope quintet, other members of the group being Hope (piano), Frank Foster (tenor sax), Percy Heath (bass) and Art Blakey (drums). Foster played on the albums Elmo Hope Quintet, Volume 2 (1952) and Hope Meets Foster (1955).

Lee wrote the song "My Delight" on the album Shades of Blue by Howard McGhee.

Lee was a member of a group of singers called "The Modern Sounds" who sang on the tracks "Movin' and Groovin'" and "The Doomed" on Gonzales' album Voila the Preacher, performed by Gonzales (vocals), Les Spann (flute), Charlie Griffin (tenor sx), Horace Parlan (piano), Charlie Rouse (bass clarinet), Ray Crawford (guitar), Peck Morrison (bass), Roy Haynes (drums) with The Modern Sounds: Joe Bailey, Curtis Lewis, Freeman Lee, Mamie Watts (all vocals).

Lee was a composer on the album Bennie Green Swings the Blues, along with Arthur Johnston and John Burke, and producer Teddy McRae. Other artists were Paul Gusman on drums, Bennie Green on trombone, Sonny Clark on piano, and Jimmy Forrest on tenor sax.

In 2017 a book about the life of Lee was published entitled “A Jazzman’s Tale”. It was written by Annette Johnson, who was inspired to write the book after having met Lee in his later years.

== Personal life ==
After his career as a jazz trumpeter, Lee was a science educator who inspired his students greatly at Krueger Junior High School in Michigan City, Indiana. His sisters Mary W. White and Jane Lee Ball were also educators. He never married but has a daughter, granddaughter, seven grandchildren and 5 great-grandchildren. He was buried in Xenia Ohio.

== Discography ==
- 2011 Bebop: It Began in the Big Apple: Trumpet
- 2008 New York Is Our Home: Trumpet
- 2004 Swings the Blues, Bennie Green: Composer
- 1997 Blue Note: A Story of Modern Jazz, Trumpet
- 1973. Howard McGhee - Shades Of Blue, Writing and Arrangement
- 1958. The Preacher - Voila: Performed by Babs Gonzales: vocals, as part of The Modern Sounds quartet
- 1957 Trio and Quintet: Elmo Hope, Main Personnel: Trumpet
- 1955 Hope Meets Foster, Elmo Hope and Frank Foster : Trumpet
- 1954 Elmo Hope Quintet (New Faces-New Sounds, Vol. 2) Elmo Hope Quintet: Trumpet

== Sources ==
1. Discography from Allmusic

2. Trio and Quintet, 1953

3. Cook, Richard: Blue Note Records: The Biography, page 70.

4. Reisner, Robert: Bird: The legend of Charlie Parker, page 230.

5. Dave Hunt Jazz

6. Mary White obituary, Michigan City News Dispatch

7. Elmo Hope Discography

8. Candice Watkins, Arnett Howard, James Loeffler. Ohio Jazz: A History of Jazz in the Buckeye State, page 43

9. A Literary Fugue in Three Parts: A Jazzman’s Tale
