= Here's Hope! =

Studio album by Elmo Hope
- Released: 1962
- Recorded: 1961; New York City
- Genre: Jazz
- Label: Celebrity; 209

Elmo Hope chronology
Elmo Hope Trio (1959)	Here's Hope! (1962)	High Hope! (1961)

Here's Hope! is an album by jazz pianist Elmo Hope which was originally released on the Celebrity label.

== Reception ==
Professional ratings
Review scores
Source	Rating
Allmusic	2/5 stars

The Allmusic review by Scott Yanow stated "The one flaw of the album is that there are only 27 minutes of music, although the quality is quite high".

== Track listing ==
All compositions by Elmo Hope

1. "Hot Sauce" - 3:32
2. "When the Groove Is Low" - 4:59
3. "De-Dah" - 4:26
4. "Abdullah" - 3:45
5. "Freddie" - 3:37
6. "Stars over Marakesh" - 6:44

== Personnel ==
- Elmo Hope - piano
- Paul Chambers - bass
- Philly Joe Jones - drums
