= Sounds from Rikers Island =

Studio album by Elmo Hope
- Released: 1963
- Recorded: August 19, 1963
- Genre: Jazz
- Length: 36:13
- Labels: Audio Fidelity; AFLP 2119
- Producer: Walt Dickerson

Elmo Hope chronology
Hope-Full (1962)	Sounds from Rikers Island (1963)	The Final Sessions (1966)

Sounds from Rikers Island is an album by jazz pianist Elmo Hope recorded in 1963 for the Audio Fidelity label.

== Reception ==
Professional ratings
Review scores
Source	Rating
Allmusic	4.5/5 stars
The Penguin Guide to Jazz	4/4 stars
DownBeat	4/5 stars

The Allmusic review by Thom Jurek stated "As a musical document, it is an overwhelming success. Hope surrounds himself with musicians whose reputations are now legendary... the level of musical empathy and improvisational reciprocity is inspiring. This is an obscure date but it shouldn't be, as it features some of Hope and Gilmore's finest playing, and shows Jones in rare, lighthearted form".

DownBeat assigned the album 4 stars. Reviewer Chuck Berg wrote, "Hope’s fine-line melodic arcs were sketched over rich harmonic backgrounds with Monk-like dissonances and evocative substitutions. He was a master of the subtle gesture, an Alexander Calder of jazz whose delicately balanced sonic mobiles seemed to float in space".

== Track listing ==
All compositions by Elmo Hope except as indicated

1. "One for Joe" - 4:34
2. "Ecstasy" - 3:15
3. "Three Silver Quarters" - 4:45
4. "A Night in Tunisia" (Dizzy Gillespie, Frank Paparelli) - 5:57
5. "Trippin'" - 3:19
6. "It Shouldn't Happen to a Dream" (Duke Ellington, Don George, Johnny Hodges) - 4:07
7. "Kevin" - 4:15
8. "Monique" - 3:02
9. "Groovin' High" (Gillespie) - 2:59

== Personnel ==
- Elmo Hope - piano
- Lawrence Jackson - trumpet
- Freddie Douglas - soprano saxophone
- John Gilmore - tenor saxophone
- Ronnie Boykins - bass
- Philly Joe Jones - drums
- Earl Coleman, Marcelle Daniels – vocals
