= Elmo Hope Trio =

Album by jazz pianist Elmo Hope

Studio album by Elmo Hope
- Released: 1960
- Recorded: February 8, 1959
- Studio: Radio Recorders Studio B, Los Angeles
- Genre: Jazz
- Length: 43:39
- Label: Hifijazz; J(S)-616
- Producer: David Axelrod

Elmo Hope chronology
Trio and Quintet (1953-57)	Elmo Hope Trio (1960)	Here's Hope! (1961)

Elmo Hope Trio is an album by jazz pianist Elmo Hope recorded in 1959 and originally released on the Hifijazz label but rereleased on Contemporary Records.

== Reception ==
Professional ratings
Review scores
Source	Rating
AllMusic	4/5 stars
DownBeat	5/5 stars
The Penguin Guide to Jazz	3/4 stars
The Rolling Stone Jazz Record Guide	5/5 stars

The AllMusic review by Scott Yanow stated "The boppish and fairly original Elmo Hope performs seven of his obscure originals, many of which are well worth reviving... Bop and straight-ahead jazz fans wanting to hear a talented pianist play fresh tunes should explore Elmo Hope's valuable music."

John A. Tynan of DownBeat praised the album, writing, "Elmo Hope’s inner story is in this album for anybody who will listen. And a moving story it is."

== Track listing ==
All compositions by Elmo Hope except as indicated

1. "B's A-Plenty" – 5:47
2. "Barfly" – 6:18
3. "Eejah" – 3:55
4. "Boa" – 6:00
5. "Something for Kenny" – 6:29
6. "Like Someone in Love" (Johnny Burke, Jimmy Van Heusen) – 7:32
7. "Minor Bertha" – 4:51
8. "Tranquility" – 2:58

== Personnel ==
- Elmo Hope – piano
- Jimmy Bond – bass
- Frank Butler – drums
