= List of cool jazz and West Coast jazz musicians =

List of cool jazz and West Coast jazz musicians and vocalists.

== A ==
- Curtis Amy - Saxophone
- Earl Anderza - alto saxophone
- David Axelrod - composer

== B ==
- Chet Baker
- Billy Bauer
- Milt Bernhart
- Lou Blackburn
- Dupree Bolton
- Bob Brookmeyer
- Clifford Brown
- Ray Brown
- Dave Brubeck
- Monty Budwig
- Larry Bunker
- Frank Butler

== C ==
- Red Callender
- Conte Candoli
- Pete Candoli
- John Carisi
- Benny Carter
- Teddy Charles
- June Christy
- James Clay
- Al Cohn
- Buddy Collette
- Junior Collins
- Chris Connor
- Bob Cooper
- Curtis Counce
- Israel Crosby

== D ==
- Miles Davis
- Michael Di Pasqua
- Paul Desmond
- Eric Dolphy

== E ==
- Harry "Sweets" Edison
- Teddy Edwards
- Don Elliott
- Herb Ellis
- Bob Enevoldsen
- Bill Evans
- Gil Evans

== F ==
- Don Fagerquist
- Tal Farlow
- Victor Feldman
- Maynard Ferguson
- Brent Fischer
- Clare Fischer
- Chuck Flores
- Carl Fontana
- Russ Freeman

== G ==
- Herb Geller (woodwinds, composer, arranger)
- Stan Getz
- Jimmy Giuffre
- Bob Gordon
- Dexter Gordon
- John Graas
- Wardell Gray
- Vince Guaraldi
- Lars Gullin

== H ==
- Jim Hall
- Charlie Haden
- Chico Hamilton
- Scott Hamilton
- Herbie Harper
- Hampton Hawes
- Percy Heath
- Woody Herman
- Billy Higgins
- Bill Holman
- Elmo Hope
- Paul Horn

== J ==
- Milt Jackson
- Bobby Jaspar
- Pete Jolly
- Carmell Jones

== K ==
- Fred Katz
- Richie Kamuca
- Connie Kay
- Barney Kessel
- Stan Kenton
- Lee Konitz
- Irene Kral
- Mark Kramer

== L ==
- Harold Land
- John LaPorta
- Stan Levey
- Lou Levy
- John Lewis
- Mel Lewis

== M ==
- Dave Mackay
- Joe Maini
- Herbie Mann
- Shelly Manne
- Larance Marable
- Charlie Mariano
- Warne Marsh
- Gary McFarland
- Gil Mellé
- Charles Mingus
- Red Mitchell
- Jack Montrose
- Joe Morello
- Frank Morgan
- Barbara Morrison
- Gerry Mulligan

== N ==
- Lennie Niehaus

== P ==
- Marty Paich
- Remo Palmier
- Dave Pell
- Art Pepper
- Bill Perkins
- Carl Perkins
- Roy Porter
- André Previn

== R ==
- Jimmy Raney
- Max Roach
- Shorty Rogers
- Frank Rosolino
- Willie Ruff
- Howard Rumsey*****

== S ==
- Bud Shank
- George Shearing
- Jack Sheldon
- Zoot Sims
- Johnny Smith
- Alvin Stoller

== T ==
- Horace Tapscott
- Cal Tjader - vibraphone, drums, piano
- Cy Touff
- Lennie Tristano
- Bobby Troup

== V ==
- Leroy Vinnegar

== W ==
- Julius Watkins
- Frank Wess
- Claude Williamson
- Stu Williamson
- Bill Watrous

== Z ==
- Mike Zwerin

== See also ==
- Lists of jazz musicians
- West Coast jazz−related topics
