= Drum Song =

Studio album by Philly Joe Jones
- Released: 1985
- Recorded: October 10–12, 1978
- Studio: Fantasy Studios, Berkeley, CA
- Genre: Jazz
- Label: Galaxy; GXY-5153
- Producer: Ed Michel

Philly Joe Jones chronology
Advance! (1978)	Drum Song (1985)	Filet de Sole/Philly of Soul (1981)

Drum Song is an album by drummer Philly Joe Jones which was recorded in 1978, at the same sessions that produced Advance!, but not released on the Galaxy label until 1985.

== Reception ==
Professional ratings
Review scores
Source	Rating
AllMusic	4.5/5 stars

The AllMusic review by Scott Yanow stated "Hard bop is spoken here on this straightahead set. Drummer Philly Joe Jones is the leader but the main emphasis is on such soloists as trumpeter Blue Mitchell (heard in one of his last recordings), the tenors of Harold Land and Charles Bowen, pianist Cedar Walton and trombonist Slide Hampton who arranged the four full-band numbers".

== Track listing ==
All compositions by Slide Hampton except where noted

1. "Our Delight" (Tadd Dameron) – 6:14
2. "I Waited for You" (Gil Fuller, Dizzy Gillespie) – 5:44
3. "Bird" – 6:35
4. "Two Bass Hit" (Gillespie, John Lewis) – 5:18
5. "Hi-Fly" (Randy Weston) – 7:45
6. "Drum Song" – 6:21

== Personnel ==
- Philly Joe Jones – drums
- Blue Mitchell – trumpet
- Slide Hampton – trombone, arranger
- Harold Land – tenor saxophone
- Charles Bowen – tenor saxophone, soprano saxophone
- Cedar Walton – piano
- Marc Johnson – bass
