= Advance! =

Studio album by Philly Joe Jones
- Released: 1979
- Recorded: October 10–12, 1978
- Studio: Fantasy Studios, Berkeley, CA
- Genre: Jazz
- Label: Galaxy; GXY-5122
- Producer: Ed Michel

Philly Joe Jones chronology
Philly Mignon (1977)	Advance! (1979)	Drum Song (1985)

Advance! is an album by drummer Philly Joe Jones which was recorded in 1978 and released on the Galaxy in the following year.

== Reception ==
Professional ratings
Review scores
Source	Rating
AllMusic	4/5 stars

The AllMusic review by Scott Yanow stated "Drummer Philly Joe Jones led a few sets for Galaxy during the 1977-78 period that featured veteran hard bop-oriented players. ... Fine music".

== Track listing ==
1. "Trailways" (Philly Joe Jones) – 6:56
2. "Invitation" (Bronisław Kaper, Paul Francis Webster) – 6:59
3. "Helena" (Atlee Chapman) – 5:57
4. "Waltz, Midnight" (Cedar Walton) – 11:01
5. "Smoke Gets in Your Eyes" (Jerome Kern, Otto Harbach) – 8:15

== Personnel ==
- Philly Joe Jones – drums
- Blue Mitchell – trumpet
- Slide Hampton – trombone
- Harold Land – tenor saxophone
- Charles Bowen – tenor saxophone, soprano saxophone
- Cedar Walton – piano
- Marc Johnson – bass
