= The Straight Horn of Steve Lacy =

Studio album by Steve Lacy
- Released: 1961
- Recorded: November 19, 1960
- Genre: Jazz
- Length: 36:05
- Label: Candid

Steve Lacy chronology
Reflections (1959)	The Straight Horn of Steve Lacy (1961)	Evidence (1961)

The Straight Horn of Steve Lacy is the third album by Steve Lacy and the first to be released on the Candid label in 1961. It features performances by Lacy, Charles Davis, John Ore, and Roy Haynes of tunes written by Thelonious Monk, Cecil Taylor, and Charlie Parker.

== Reception ==
The AllMusic review by Scott Yanow stated, "Some of soprano saxophonist Steve Lacy's most interesting recordings are his earliest ones. After spending periods of time playing with Dixieland groups and then with Cecil Taylor (which was quite a jump), Lacy made several recordings that displayed his love of Thelonious Monk's music plus his varied experiences. On this particular set, Lacy's soprano contrasts well with Charles Davis's baritone (they are backed by bassist John Ore and drummer Roy Haynes) on three of the most difficult Monk tunes ('Introspection', 'Played Twice', and 'Criss Cross') plus two Cecil Taylor compositions and Charlie Parker's 'Donna Lee'."

Professional ratings
Review scores
Source	Rating
AllMusic	5/5 stars
The Penguin Guide to Jazz Recordings	3/4 stars

== Track listing ==
1. "Louise" (Taylor) - 5:16
2. "Introspection" (Monk) - 5:20
3. "Donna Lee" (Parker) - 7:41
4. "Played Twice" (Monk) - 5:44
5. "Air" (Taylor) - 6:27
6. "Criss Cross" (Monk) - 5:37

- Recorded at Nola Penthouse Sound Studios, NY, November 19, 1960

== Personnel ==
- Steve Lacy - soprano saxophone
- Charles Davis - baritone saxophone
- John Ore - bass
- Roy Haynes - drums
