= Mean What You Say (Philly Joe Jones album) =

Studio album by Philly Joe Jones
- Released: 1977
- Recorded: April 6–7, 1977
- Studio: CI Recording Studio, NYC
- Genre: Jazz
- Length: 40:35
- Label: Sonet; SNTF 735
- Producer: Sam Charters

Philly Joe Jones chronology
Archie Shepp & Philly Joe Jones (1970)	Mean What You Say (1977)	Philly Mignon (1977)

Mean What You Say is an album by drummer Philly Joe Jones that was recorded in 1977 and released on the Sonet label.

== Reception ==
Professional ratings
Review scores
Source	Rating
AllMusic	4.5/5 stars

The AllMusic review by Bob Rusch stated: "This was a nice blowing date for Bowen, who at the time had an R&B background and had never before recorded a jazz album...Mickey Tucker was very strong on this set and at times almost seemed to be the leader with Jones seemingly pushing to assert his position. Still, this was an enjoyable recording with just that little extra added personality to give it an extra edge".

== Track listing ==
1. "Mean What You Say" (Thad Jones) – 8:05
2. "You Tell Me" (Simmons) – 6:59
3. "D. C. Farewell" (Richie Cole) – 6:00
4. "Jim's Jewel" (Charles Bowen) – 6:40
5. "Gretchen" (Bowen) – 7:00
6. "Ugetsu" (Cedar Walton) – 7:22

== Personnel ==
- Philly Joe Jones – drums
- Tommy Turrentine – trumpet (tracks 1, 6)
- Charles Bowen – soprano saxophone, tenor saxophone
- Mickey Tucker – piano
- Mickey Bass – bass
