= Roger Segure =

American jazz musician

Roger Segure (May 22, 1905 – January 28, 2000) was an American jazz arranger and songwriter.

He was born in Brooklyn, New York. Segure was primarily an autodidact. In the 1930's, he managed singer Midge Williams and provided piano accompaniment for her tours of the United States and East Asia. He penned several songs for Williams with writer Langston Hughes. In 1937, Williams recorded four titles with backing by the Raymond Scott Quintette. Scott's later big band performed and recorded Segure's compositions "Two Way Stretch" and "Three Men on a Riff."

In the 1930s Segure wrote jazz arrangements for Louis Armstrong, Andy Kirk, and John Kirby. From 1940 to 1942, he was an arranger for Jimmie Lunceford. Segure penned the score for Lunceford for the film, Blues in the Night. He moved to Los Angeles, California, in the 1940s, where he studied with Mario Castelnuovo-Tedesco and worked as a musical director for television and in music education. Segure also helped integrate the Los Angeles chapters of the American Federation of Musicians.
