= Memorial Album (Clifford Brown album) =

1956 album by Clifford Brown

Compilation album by Clifford Brown
- Released: Mid September 1956
- Recorded: June 9, 1953; August 28, 1953
- Studio: WOR Studios, NYC; Audio-Video Studios, NYC
- Genre: Jazz
- Length: 71:08
- Label: Blue Note; BLP 1526
- Producer: Alfred Lion

Clifford Brown chronology
Memorial Album (1956)	Memorial (1956)

New Faces – New Sounds

Studio album by the Lou Donaldson Quintet
- Released: 1953
- Recorded: June 9, 1953
- Studio: WOR Studios, NYC
- Genre: Jazz
- Label: Blue Note; BLP 5030
- Producer: Alfred Lion

Clifford Brown chronology
New Faces – New Sounds (1953)	New Star on the Horizon (1953)

New Star on the Horizon

Studio album by Clifford Brown
- Released: 1953
- Recorded: August 28, 1953
- Studio: Audio-Video Studios, NYC
- Genre: Jazz
- Label: Blue Note; BLP 5032
- Producer: Alfred Lion

Clifford Brown chronology
New Faces – New Sounds (1953)	New Star on the Horizon (1953)	A Study in Dameronia (1953)

Memorial Album is an album by American jazz trumpeter Clifford Brown recorded on June 9, 1953 and August 28, 1953 and released on Blue Note in September 1956. The two sessions were originally released on ten-inch LPs as New Faces – New Sounds (1953) (credited to Lou Donaldson–Clifford Brown) and New Star on the Horizon (1953), respectively.

== Background ==
Apart from a few obscure recordings, the album represents the first tracks recorded under Brown's leadership.

=== Release history ===
The 2001 RVG Edition of the album features a re-organized track listing and remastering. Van Gelder says in the liner notes that "the original LP mixed various sessions in incomplete form", while the CD reissue "presents the music of each session as it was recorded and in complete form." The reissue also contains alternate takes that were originally released on vinyl as Alternate Takes in the U.S. and More Memorable Tracks in Japan.

=== Legacy ===
Blue Note annotator Bob Blumenthal for the 2001 re-issue called the compilation an early chapter "in the tragically brief legacy of one of the greatest musicians in jazz history. They helped introduce trumpeter Clifford Brown to the world, contributed to his meteoric rise to prominence, and set an incredibly high standard for debut recordings that successive generations have found difficult to match."

== Reception ==
Professional ratings
Review scores
Source	Rating
AllMusic	4/5 stars

The AllMusic review by Alex Henderson stated: "Recorded in 1953, the material on this 18-track CD isn't quite as essential as some of Brown's work with drummer Max Roach in 1954 and 1955, but is still superb... Casual listeners would be better off starting out with some of Brown's recordings with Max Roach; nonetheless, seasoned fans will find that this CD is a treasure chest".

== Track listing ==
=== Original 12" LP (1956, BLP 1526) ===
Side 1
No.	Title	Writer(s)	Date recorded	Length
1.	"Hymn of the Orient"	Gigi Gryce	August 28, 1953
2.	"Easy Living"	Ralph Rainger; Leo Robin	August 28, 1953
3.	"Minor Mood"	Clifford Brown	August 28, 1953
4.	"Cherokee"	Ray Noble	August 28, 1953
5.	"Wail Bait"	Quincy Jones	August 28, 1953

Side 2
No.	Title	Writer(s)	Date recorded	Length
1.	"Brownie Speaks"	Clifford Brown	June 9, 1953
2.	"De-Dah"	Elmo Hope	June 9, 1953
3.	"Cookin'"	Lou Donaldson	June 9, 1953
4.	"You Go to My Head"	J. Fred Coots; Haven Gillespie	June 9, 1953
5.	"Carvin' the Rock"	Hope; Sonny Rollins	June 9, 1953

=== 2001 CD reissue ===
No.	Title	Writer(s)	Date recorded	Length
1.	"Bellarosa"	Elmo Hope; Sonny Rollins	June 9, 1953	4:14
2.	"Carvin' the Rock"	Hope; Rollins	June 9, 1953	3:56
3.	"Cookin'"	Donaldson	June 9, 1953	3:14
4.	"Brownie Speaks"	Brown	June 9, 1953	3:46
5.	"De-Dah"	Hope	June 9, 1953	4:51
6.	"You Go to My Head"	Coots; Gillespie	June 9, 1953	4:19
7.	"Carvin' the Rock"		June 9, 1953	3:51
8.	"Cookin'" (alternate take)	Donaldson	June 9, 1953	3:08
9.	"Carvin' the Rock" (alternate take 2)		June 9, 1953	4:05
10.	"Wail Bait"	Jones	August 28, 1953	4:02
11.	"Hymn of the Orient"	Gryce	August 28, 1953	4:07
12.	"Brownie Eyes"	Jones	August 28, 1953	3:56
13.	"Cherokee"	Noble	August 28, 1953	3:27
14.	"Easy Living"	Rainger; Robin	August 28, 1953	3:44
15.	"Minor Mood"	Brown	August 28, 1953	4:34
16.	"Wail Bait" (alternate take)	Jones	August 28, 1953	4:07
17.	"Cherokee" (alternate take)	Noble	August 28, 1953	3:42
18.	"Hymn of the Orient" (alternate take)	Gryce	August 28, 1953	4:01

=== Lou Donaldson–Clifford Brown – New Faces – New Sounds 10" LP (1953, BLP 5030) ===
Side 1
No.	Title	Writer(s)	Date recorded	Length
1.	"Carvin' the Rock"	Elmo Hope; Sonny Rollins	June 9, 1953
2.	"You Go to My Head"	J. Fred Coots; Haven Gillespie	June 9, 1953
3.	"De-Dah"	Elmo Hope	June 9, 1953

Side 2
No.	Title	Writer(s)	Date recorded	Length
1.	"Brownie Speaks"	Clifford Brown	June 9, 1953
2.	"Cookin'"	Lou Donaldson	June 9, 1953
3.	"Bellarosa"	Elmo Hope; Sonny Rollins	June 9, 1953

=== New Star on the Horizon 10" LP (1954, BLP 5032) ===
Side 1
No.	Title	Writer(s)	Date recorded	Length
1.	"Cherokee"	Ray Noble	August 28, 1953
2.	"Easy Living"	Ralph Rainger; Leo Robin	August 28, 1953
3.	"Wail Bait"	Quincy Jones	August 28, 1953

Side 2
No.	Title	Writer(s)	Date recorded	Length
1.	"Minor Mood"	Clifford Brown	August 28, 1953
2.	"Hymn of the Orient"	Gigi Gryce	August 28, 1953
3.	"Brownie Eyes"	Philly Joe Jones	August 28, 1953

== Personnel ==
=== Musicians ===
==== June 9, 1953 ====
- Clifford Brown – trumpet
- Lou Donaldson – alto saxophone
- Elmo Hope – piano
- Percy Heath – bass
- Philly Joe Jones – drums
  - recorded at WOR Studios, NYC

==== August 28, 1953 ====
- Clifford Brown – trumpet
- John Lewis – piano
- Gigi Gryce – alto saxophone, flute
- Charlie Rouse – tenor saxophone
- Percy Heath – bass
- Art Blakey – drums
  - recorded at Audio-Video Studios, NYC

=== Technical personnel ===
- Alfred Lion – producer
- Rudy Van Gelder – recording engineer, mastering
- Francis Wolff – photography
- Leonard Feather – liner notes
