= West Coast jazz =

Various styles of jazz music

- Stylistic origins: Bebop; swing; classical
- Cultural origins: 1940s, West Coast of the United States

Local scenes
- Los Angeles; San Francisco

Other topics
- Cool jazz

West Coast jazz refers to styles of jazz that developed in the American West Coast cities of Los Angeles and San Francisco during the 1950s. West Coast jazz is often seen as a subgenre of cool jazz, which consisted of a calmer style than bebop or hard bop. The music relied relatively more on composition and arrangement than on the individually improvised playing of other jazz styles. Although this style dominated, it was not the only form of jazz heard on the American West Coast.

== History ==
=== Background ===
Before World War II, the west coast of the U.S. hosted a bustling music scene, though its activity remained largely localized. In 1917, Jelly Roll Morton moved to California and remained in Los Angeles until 1922, when he left for Chicago. Kid Ory formed a band in Los Angeles after moving to California in 1919. In 1944, Norman Granz began staging Jazz at the Philharmonic shows at Philharmonic Auditorium in Los Angeles. In 1946, Ross Russell established Dial Records in Hollywood to record Charlie Parker during his sojourn in Los Angeles. Meanwhile, a thriving jazz scene had appeared along Los Angeles's Central Avenue, featuring Dexter Gordon, Wardell Gray, Teddy Edwards, Charles Mingus, and Buddy Collette. Central Avenue's activity rivaled that of the earlier Kansas City jazz scene, but at the time it was little-known outside Los Angeles.

In 1947, Woody Herman organized a new band, the Second Herd, in Los Angeles. The group included tenor saxophonists Stan Getz, Zoot Sims, and Herbie Steward, and baritone saxophonist Serge Chaloff. The resulting "Four Brothers" sound (named for the Jimmy Giuffre composition, "Four Brothers," which highlighted this group) was a precursor of the cool style.

=== Development ===
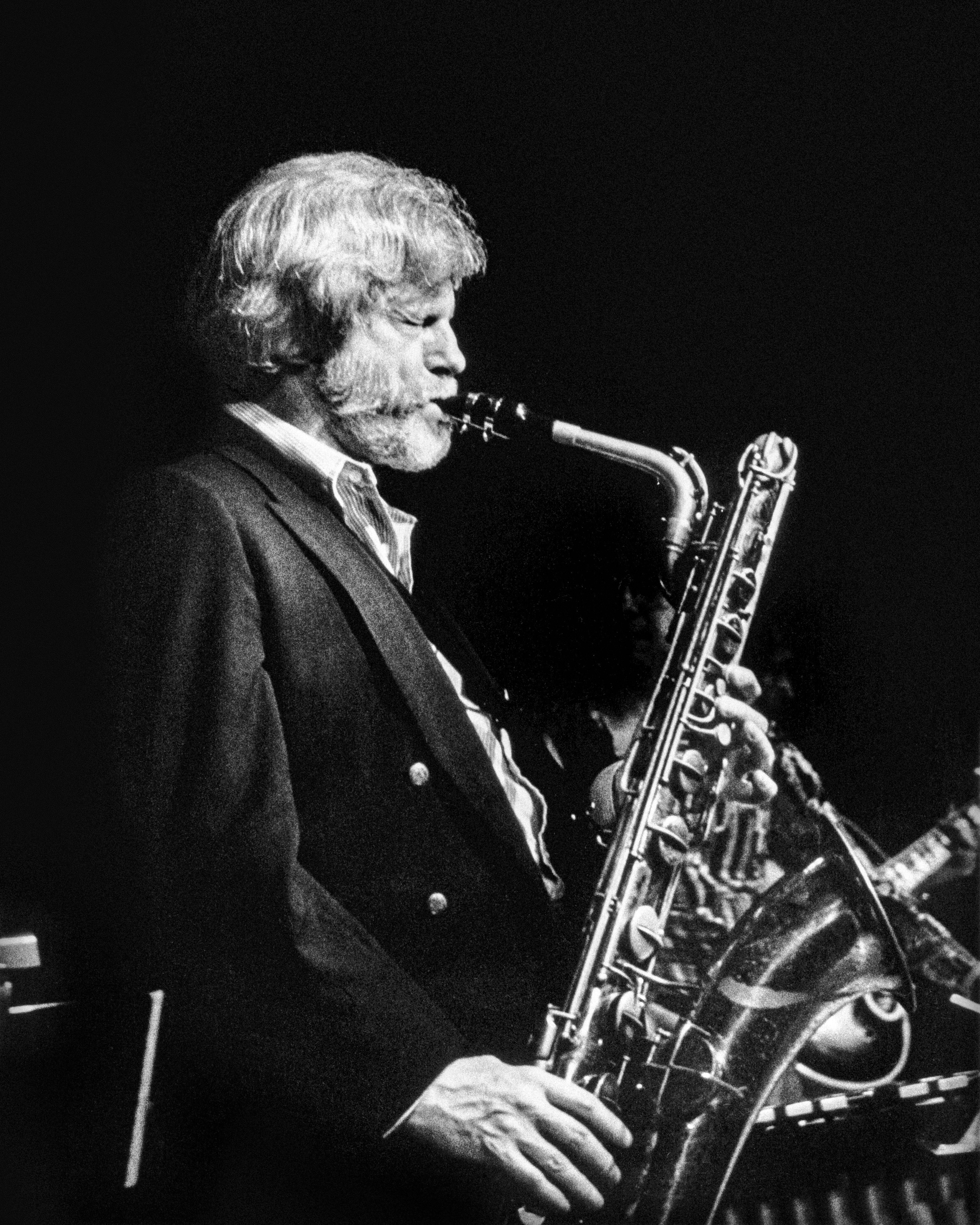
Gerry Mulligan performing in the 1980s. His early arrangements for Birth of the Cool helped shape the West Coast jazz style.

In 1949–1950 baritone saxophonist Gerry Mulligan participated in the Miles Davis band, contributing arrangements to the recordings that became Birth of the Cool (1957). In 1952 Mulligan, who had moved to California, formed an innovative and successful piano-less quartet with trumpeter Chet Baker, drummer Chico Hamilton, and bassist Bob Whitlock. Mulligan would later form a decet based on the Birth of the Cool nonet.

In 1950, Stan Kenton disbanded his Innovations Orchestra in Los Angeles. Many of the musicians, some of whom had also played in Woody Herman's band, chose to remain in California. Trumpeter Shorty Rogers and drummers Stan Levey and Shelly Manne were central figures among this group of musicians. Much of this activity centered on the Hermosa Beach Lighthouse Café, where bassist Howard Rumsey led a house band, the Lighthouse All-Stars.

Manne suggested that these musicians' relaxed lifestyle in California was reflected in a laid-back, relaxed approach to jazz. Bob Rusch concurs:

The West coast sound perhaps didn't have the gravitas that the East coast had, but, after all, these were Californians enjoying the sun and the surf and the extent that celebrity offered itself through the studio work that the entertainment industry was offering. So I think, you know, you think of California as sun and surf, you think of New York City as cement and grit, and the music somewhat reflected that. One better than the other? Depends what you want.

During the 1950s, Chico Hamilton led an ensemble that (unusual for a jazz group) included a cellist, Fred Katz. Tanner, Gerow, and Megill liken Hamilton's music to chamber music, and have noted that Hamilton's "subtle rhythmic control and use of different drum pitches and timbres" were well-suited for this style of music.

In 1951, pianist Dave Brubeck hired alto saxophonist Paul Desmond, forming a quartet. Desmond's playing style ran counter to bebop, as he seldom used blues elements, and was influenced by Pete Brown and Benny Carter rather than Charlie Parker.

The Pacific Jazz and Contemporary record labels were two of the best known that carried West Coast jazz, just as Blue Note and Prestige were the biggest hard-bop labels. Some of the major pioneers of West Coast jazz were Shorty Rogers, Gerry Mulligan, Chet Baker, Stan Getz, Bud Shank, Bob Cooper, Jimmy Giuffre, Shelly Manne, Russ Freeman, Bill Holman, Clare Fischer, Cal Tjader, André Previn, and Dave Brubeck with Paul Desmond. In 1952–1962 jazz singer Anita O'Day recorded 17 albums for Norman Granz's Los Angeles-based Norgran and Verve labels.

While many Los Angeles area jazz musicians, particularly the former members of the Herman and Kenton bands, found regular employment in broadcast and motion picture studios, most of these musicians were white, leading to accusations that the studios deliberately excluded African Americans. The situation was a contributing factor toward the integration of the Los Angeles chapters of the American Federation of Musicians during the early 1950s. Pianist Marl Young recalled that in 1950,

as far as I knew, there were no blacks working regularly in the industry, especially on the networks – ABC, CBS and NBC. [Estelle Edson] asked me if the fact that the Musicians Unions were segregated contributed to the scarcity of blacks in the industry. It certainly could have been a contributing factor in that all the contracts for employment of musicians in the broadcast and motion picture studios were negotiated by the then all-white union, Local 47. The black union, Local 767, merely adopted the scales negotiated by Local 47, if and when a black musician got a studio call.

Young, who also held a law degree, worked with Local 767 musicians (including Buddy Collette, Red Callender, and Benny Carter) along with Local 47 members (including Roger Segure) to integrate the union. Josephine Baker supported the local integration effort.

=== California Hard ===
Although West Coast jazz is often compared to the cool style, Los Angeles musicians locally known as "hard swingers" "blew bop as tough as anything emerging out of Detroit and New York...." In later years, their music was known as "California Hard." Roy Carr notes that this is not surprising. By the late 1940s, the Central Avenue scene had the most bebop musicians outside New York. In the 1950s, Max Roach and Clifford Brown, Shelly Manne, and Curtis Counce established harder-sounding bands in Los Angeles.

== Sound ==
West Coast jazz sometimes featured a rhythm section that omitted the use of a piano, guitar, or any chordal instrument, tending to a more open and freer sound, as exemplified by the Gerry Mulligan collection The Original Quartet with Chet Baker (Blue Note, 1998). Another characteristic is the inclusion of non-standard jazz instruments such as the French horn and tuba. Gil Evans's arrangement on the Birth of the Cool album featured these instruments at a time when the West Coast style was emerging.

== Reception ==
Tanner, Gerow, and Megill are largely dismissive of the term "West Coast jazz". As it often refers to Gerry Mulligan and his associates in California, "West Coast" merely becomes synonymous with "cool jazz", although Lester Young, Claude Thornhill, and Miles Davis were based in New York. At the same time, many musicians associated with West Coast jazz "were much more involved in a hotter approach to jazz. Communication being what it is, it is hardly likely that any style of jazz was fostered exclusively in one area."

Some observers looked down upon West Coast jazz because many of its musicians were white, and because some listeners, critics, and historians perceived that the music was too cerebral, effete, or effeminate, or that it lacked swing. However, African American musicians played in the style, including Curtis Counce, John Lewis, Chico Hamilton, Harry "Sweets" Edison, Buddy Collette, Red Callender, Harold Land, Eugene Wright and Hampton Hawes.

== See also ==
- List of cool jazz and West Coast jazz musicians
- Black Hawk (nightclub)
- Chamber jazz
- GNP Crescendo Records
- The Haig
- Third stream

== Sources ==
- Gioia, Ted. West Coast Jazz: Modern Jazz in California 1945-1960 (Oxford University Press, 1992)
- Gordon, Robert. Jazz West Coast: The Los Angeles Jazz Scene of the 1950s (Quartet Books, 1986)

== Films ==
- 2005: Jazz on the West Coast: The Lighthouse (RoseKing Productions, Kenneth Koenig)
