= Polka Dots and Moonbeams =

Popular song published in 1940

Song
- B-side: "I'll Be Seeing You"
- Genre: Ballad · Traditional Pop
- Label: Victor
- Composer: Jimmy Van Heusen
- Lyricist: Johnny Burke

"Polka Dots and Moonbeams" is a popular song with music by Jimmy Van Heusen and lyrics by Johnny Burke, published in 1940.

First recorded and released under Victor Records by the Tommy Dorsey Orchestra, it became vocalist Frank Sinatra's first hit song. Sinatra went on to record many more of Van Heusen's songs throughout his career.

The song's release coincided with a rise in popularity of the fabric in American fashion—in the 1940s, polka dot patterns were having a "second heyday" as a symbol of patriotism amidst World War II.

== Recordings ==
The song is one of the top 100 most-frequently recorded jazz standards. Notable recordings include:

- Lester Young with his quartet in 1952
- Mel Tormé on his 1955 album It's a Blue World
- Elmo Hope with his sextet on the 1956 album Informal Jazz
- Sarah Vaughan for the 1957 album Swingin' Easy
- Chet Baker on his 1958 album Chet Baker in New York
- Connie Stevens on her 1958, debut album Conchetta
- Wes Montgomery on his 1960 album The Incredible Jazz Guitar of Wes Montgomery
- The Bill Evans Trio on their 1962 album Moon Beams
- Blue Mitchell in 1967
- John Denver covered the song on his 1976 album Spirit.
- Gerry Mulligan on the 1955 album California Concerts.
- Bob Dylan covered this song for his 2016 album Fallen Angels

=== Other uses ===
Doja Cat's 2018 single Mooo! sampled Wes Mongomery's recording of the song.
