= Elmo Hope =

American jazz pianist, composer and arranger (1923–1967)

Background information
- Born: St. Elmo Sylvester Hope; June 27, 1923; New York City, New York, U.S.
- Died: May 19, 1967 (aged 43) New York City, New York
- Genres: Jazz
- Occupations: Musician, composer, arranger
- Instrument: Piano
- Years active: 1940s–66

St. Elmo Sylvester Hope (June 27, 1923 – May 19, 1967) was an American jazz pianist, composer, and arranger, chiefly in the bebop and hard bop genres. He grew up playing and listening to jazz and classical music with Bud Powell, and both were close friends of another influential pianist, Thelonious Monk.

Hope survived being shot by police as a youth to become a New York-based musician who recorded with several emerging stars in the early to mid-1950s, including trumpeter Clifford Brown, and saxophonists John Coltrane, Lou Donaldson, Jackie McLean, and Sonny Rollins. A long-term heroin user, Hope had his license to perform in New York's clubs withdrawn after a drug conviction, so he moved to Los Angeles in 1957. He was not happy during his four years on the West Coast, but had some successful collaborations there, including with saxophonist Harold Land.

More recordings as leader ensued following Hope's return to New York, but they did little to gain him more public or critical attention. Further drug and health problems reduced the frequency of his public performances, which ended a year before his death, at the age of 43. He remains little known, despite, or because of, the individuality of his playing and composing, which were complex and stressed subtlety and variation rather than the virtuosity predominant in bebop.

== Early life ==
Elmo Hope was born on June 27, 1923, in New York City. His parents, Simon and Gertrude Hope, were immigrants from the Caribbean, and had several children. Elmo began playing the piano aged seven. He had classical music lessons as a child, and won solo piano recital contests from 1938. Fellow pianist Bud Powell was a childhood friend; together, they played and listened to jazz and classical music. Hope attended Benjamin Franklin High School, which was known for its music program. He developed an excellent understanding of harmony, and composed jazz and classical pieces at school.

At the age of 17, Hope was shot by a New York policeman. He was taken to Sydenham Hospital, where doctors reported that the bullet had narrowly missed his spine. Six weeks later, after Hope had been released from the hospital, he appeared in court, charged with "assault, attempted robbery and violation of the Sullivan Law". The police officers involved testified in court that Hope had been part of a group of five involved in a mugging. None of the other four, or any of the three alleged white victims, were identified by police; Hope stated that he had been running away with other passers-by after police started shooting, and was hit while trying to enter a hallway. The judge dismissed the charges against Hope, after which Hope's attorney described the shooting as an "outrage", and the charges as "an attempted frameup".

Hope's recovery was slow, and he did not go back to school. Instead, he played the piano in an assortment of taxi dance halls and other establishments in the city. Hope and Powell met fellow pianist Thelonious Monk in 1942, and the three young men spent much time together. This was interrupted in March 1943, when Hope enlisted as a private in the U.S. Army. In the enlistment records, Hope was listed as being single, with dependents. He had been married and had a son, who died. The terms of enlistment stated that Hope would be in the army "for the duration of the War [World War II] or other emergency, plus six months".

== Later life and career ==
=== In New York – 1947–56 ===
Hope's absence from the early bebop scene largely continued after he left the army, as he played principally in rhythm and blues bands for a few years. He was part of an octet led by trumpeter Eddie Robinson late in 1947, and played briefly with Snub Mosley around the same time. Hope had his first long-term association, with the Joe Morris band, from 1948 to 1951, including for several recordings. This band toured all over the United States.

Some of those Hope met in Morris' band were also interested in jazz. One, saxophonist Johnny Griffin, recalled a group of musicians, including Hope, who practiced and learned together in New York in the days of late-1940s bebop: "We'd go to Monk's house in Harlem or to Elmo's house in the Bronx, we just did a lot of playing. I played piano a bit, too, so I could hear what they were all doing harmonically. But if something stumped me, I'd ask and Elmo would spell out harmonies. We'd play Dizzy [Gillespie]'s tunes or Charlie Parker's."

This interest had expanded by June 1953, when Hope recorded in New York as part of a quintet led by trumpeter Clifford Brown and alto saxophonist Lou Donaldson. Critic Marc Myers suggested that the six songs the band recorded were the first in a new form of jazz, 'hard bop', that became highly influential. That 1953 session also helped Hope gain exposure with Blue Note Records' producer Alfred Lion, who supervised his debut recording as a leader around a week later. This resulted in the 10-inch album Elmo Hope Trio, which had Morris alumni Percy Heath on bass and Philly Joe Jones on drums. The tracks recorded illustrated, according to critic Kenny Mathieson in 2012, that Hope was interested in the architecture and aural detail of the music more than in individual virtuosity. A further Blue Note recording session 11 months later led to Elmo Hope Quintet, Volume 2.

In August 1954, Hope was pianist for a Prestige Records session led by saxophonist Sonny Rollins, which was released as Moving Out, and for another session with Donaldson. Hope signed to Prestige in 1955, and recorded the trio album Meditations for them that year. This was followed by the sextet Informal Jazz the following year, with Donald Byrd (trumpet), John Coltrane and Hank Mobley (tenor saxophones), Paul Chambers (bass), and Jones (drums). Some commentators have suggested that sessions such as this and the ones with Brown and Rollins were a hindrance to Hope's career: "He too often recorded with young, rising overshadowing talents" wrote a Buffalo Jazz Report reviewer in 1976.

In January 1956, Hope recorded with another rising star, Jackie McLean, for the saxophonist's Lights Out!, again for Prestige. In April of the same year, Hope should have appeared on saxophonist Gene Ammons' The Happy Blues, but he left the record company's building before the session began and did not return. Hope claimed that he had gone to visit an aunt in hospital, but his absence was attributed by others to his heroin addiction. This had existed on and off for several years, and had led to at least one spell in prison. His drug problem and associated criminal record led to the withdrawal of Hope's New York City Cabaret Card around 1956, so he was no longer permitted to play in clubs in the city.

=== In Los Angeles – 1957–61 ===
Unable to earn a living in New York because of the performance ban, Hope toured with trumpeter Chet Baker in 1957 and then began living in Los Angeles. He soon found other musicians who had been influenced by bebop, including saxophonist Harold Land and bassist Curtis Counce. Hope played with Rollins again, and, in October 1957, recorded a session known as The Elmo Hope Quintet Featuring Harold Land which Pacific Jazz did not release until 1962, along with the contents of a 1957 Jazz Messengers album. In March of the following year, Hope became part of Counce's band, and went on to record two albums with the bassist. Hope also did some arranging for others around this time, including for Land's 1958 Harold in the Land of Jazz. Hope also had his own band, with personnel that varied, and in 1959 he played with Lionel Hampton in Hollywood. Later that year, after performances in San Francisco with two quartets – the first containing Rollins, bassist Scott LaFaro, and drummer Lenny McBrowne; the other with Rollins replaced by Land – Hope travelled north with the Land group to play at a venue in Vancouver.

Back in Los Angeles in August 1959, Hope was pianist for Land's quintet album The Fox; he also wrote four of the album's compositions. This recording, along with Elmo Hope Trio from the same year, were, in the opinion of jazz historian David Rosenthal, illustrative of Hope's musical development on the West Coast. The trio album received a rare five-star review from Down Beat magazine, with the comment that Hope's aesthetic was "a sort of bitter-sweet melancholy that seems to lie at the core of other jazzmen [...] who sometimes find the world 'a bit much', as the English say, to cope with."

In 1960, Hope married the pianist Bertha Rosemond (better known as Bertha Hope), whom he met in California. As a jazz musician on the West Coast, Hope found his life frustrating. In his only major published interview (written up for Down Beat in January 1961 and entitled "Bitter Hope"), he criticized the lack of creativity in the then-popular church-influenced soul jazz, complained about the shortage of good musicians in Los Angeles, and lamented the lack of work opportunities in the few jazz clubs in the area. Hope left Los Angeles later in 1961. His wife recounted that he was no longer working with Land, had recording offers from companies based on the East Coast, and still preferred it to Los Angeles, so the couple and their baby daughter moved to New York.

=== Back in New York – 1961–67 ===
In June 1961, Hope was part of Philly Joe Jones' quintet, which included trumpeter Freddie Hubbard. Their first gigs were arranged by Hope's old friend, Monk, as was a recording session for Riverside Records that month, with Hope as leader. The pianist recorded four albums in New York around 1961, including Hope-Full, which contained his only solo tracks and some piano duets with his wife.

Some of the companies that he recorded for at this stage in his career reduced Hope's dignity, in the view of musician and critic Robert Palmer. One album was entitled High Hope! (1961), and another, released as Sounds from Rikers Island (1963) in reference to a New York City jail complex, featured performances exclusively by musicians who had at some point been imprisoned for drug-related crimes. Between these two sessions as leader, Hope was briefly in prison again for drug offenses. These and other album releases in the early 1960s did little to develop a wider awareness of Hope.

Hope played with McLean again late in 1962. He also led a piano trio: early in 1963 it contained Ray Kenney on bass and Lex Humphries on drums; in late 1964, it had John Ore on bass and Billy Higgins on drums. In 1965, Hope was continuing to lead a trio and quartet in the New York area. Drug and health problems, however, meant that he played less often late in his career. His last recordings were made in 1966, but not released for 11 years. Hope's final concert was at Judson Hall in New York City in 1966. Fellow pianist Horace Tapscott reported that, later, Hope's "hands were all shot up and he couldn't play".

Visits to one hospital that was experienced in addressing the health problems of drug addicts left Hope feeling that he was being experimented on, so he went to another, St. Clare's. Here, according to his wife, the treatment was not adjusted for the methadone program he was on, putting added strain on his heart. Hope was hospitalized with pneumonia in 1967 and died a few weeks later, on May 19, of heart failure. His wife was aged 31 at the time of his death. They had three children; their daughter, Monica Hope, became a singer.

== Artistry ==
Hope's playing was strongly based in the blues-influenced jazz tradition. He employed dissonant harmonies and spiky, contrasting lines and phrases. Rosenthal observed that Hope's playing on one of his compositions for the 1953 Donaldson–Brown recording illustrated "many elements of the pianist's emerging style: somber, internally shifting chords in the introduction; punchy, twisting phrases in the solo; and the smoldering intensity that always characterized his best work." Hope's sense of time meant that his note placement was unpredictable, falling at various points either side of the beat but not exactly on it. His use of keyboard dynamics was similarly flexible, as the listener could not predict when in a performance the level would change. The Billboard reviewer of Hope's final recordings, as reissued in 1996, wrote that "he's dynamically smoother than Monk, with a spidery, spacy touch. His harmonic and compositional approach is intricate in design and almost eerie in execution." Coda critic Stuart Broomer also commented on Hope's touch, suggesting that it was unusual and light, and created a combination of delicacy and boldness that was all his own. Leonard Feather and Ira Gitler summarized Hope's abilities: he had "a style that parallels Powell, [...and] was a pianist and composer of rare harmonic acuity and very personal interpretation."

== Compositions ==
The New Grove Dictionary of Jazz states that Hope composed around 75 pieces of music, which "range in character from a tortuous nervousness to an introspective, semi-lyrical romanticism." One example, "Minor Bertha", has an unusual 35-bar AABA form, with a nine-bar A-section that "utilizes unconventional rhythms and weakly functional harmonies which obscure its phrases. Such other pieces as 'One Down', 'Barfly', and 'Tranquility' [...] also offer fine examples of his idiosyncratic creativity."

The Penguin Jazz Guide commented that Hope's compositions were strongly melodic, with some containing concepts of fugue and canon taken from classical music, but retaining foundations in the blues. Atkins stated that Hope wrote highly structured, complex compositions that he played with improvisational flexibility. Mathieson pointed out that, despite the originality of Hope's compositions, they have been taken up by other musicians only rarely, as they are tied to Hope's idiosyncratic form of expression and remain difficult to play.

== Legacy and influence ==
Hope, Powell, and Monk were considered by their contemporaries to be influences on each other early in their careers, and all, therefore, helped affect the development of jazz piano. Powell was known for horn-like right-hand playing supported by simple left-hand chords, which was something he had worked on with Hope. Later pianists who have cited Hope as a major influence include Lafayette Gilchrist, Alexander Hawkins, Frank Hewitt, and Hasaan Ibn Ali. Hawkins said in 2013 that Hope was important because he had a highly individual style but does not have the iconic status of pianists such as Monk. Modern jazz guitarist Kurt Rosenwinkel has mentioned Hope's rhythms, phrasing, and compositions as influences.

Bertha Hope has released albums dedicated to her former husband's compositions. She and her later husband, bassist Walter Booker, created a band named "Elmollenium" in 1999, which played Elmo's compositions. She transcribed recordings to recreate his arrangements, following an apartment fire that destroyed most of the original manuscripts. In September 2016, Lyman Place in the Bronx was co-named "Elmo Hope Way – Jazz Pioneer" in honor of the pianist.

Several critics have advocated for a reassessment of Hope's career. One is Chuck Berg, writing for Down Beat in 1980, who attributed the ignoring of Hope by most jazz fans and critics largely to the uniqueness of his style, which differed from that prevalent in jazz generally and in bebop in particular. Berg contrasted the "aggressive assertiveness, massive outpourings of raw energy and displays of technical athleticism" that, he argued, are valued in jazz, with Hope's more nuanced and intellectual approach, and suggested that the expansion of what is accepted in jazz since his death meant that his career should be re-evaluated. Seven years later, Palmer wrote on Hope and fellow pianist Herbie Nichols: "they were practically categorized out of existence. Dismissed as second-stringers and copyists when they were both prolifically creative and highly original, they suffered a neglect that is only now beginning to be dispelled in the case of Nichols, and that still continues in the case of Hope." In 2010, The Penguin Jazz Guide observed that, "Like many of his piano generation, [... Hope's] work is only now being properly studied and appreciated."

Pianist Hasaan Ibn Ali said of Hope, "He was one of the foremost great ones to offer such a large dose for the sickness of music. And upon his ideals, and knowing help was needed, he gave to companions Thelonious Monk and Bud Powell and many others.... [D]uring this time, so much being produced, so much being brought forth by the musicians, still he being the actual cause." Tenor saxophonist Johnny Griffin called Hope "the real genius of the piano."

== Discography ==
=== As leader ===
Year recorded	Title	Label	Personnel/Notes
1953	Elmo Hope Trio	Blue Note	Trio, with Percy Heath (bass), Philly Joe Jones (drums)
1954	Elmo Hope Quintet, Volume 2	Blue Note	Quintet, with Charles Freeman Lee (trumpet), Frank Foster (tenor sax), Percy Heath (bass), Art Blakey (drums)
1955	Meditations	Prestige	Trio, with John Ore (bass), Willie Jones (drums)
1955	Hope Meets Foster	Prestige	Quartet, with Frank Foster (tenor sax), John Ore (bass), Art Taylor (drums); quintet on some tracks, with Charles Freeman Lee (trumpet) added
1956	Informal Jazz	Prestige	Sextet, with Donald Byrd (trumpet), John Coltrane and Hank Mobley (tenor sax), Paul Chambers (bass), Philly Joe Jones (drums)
1957	The Elmo Hope Quintet Featuring Harold Land	Pacific	Quintet, with Stu Williamson (trumpet), Harold Land (tenor sax), Leroy Vinnegar (bass), Frank Butler (drums)
1959	Elmo Hope Trio	Hifijazz	Trio, with Jimmy Bond (bass), Frank Butler (drums)
1961	Here's Hope!	Celebrity	Trio, with Paul Chambers (bass), Philly Joe Jones (drums)
1961	High Hope!	Beacon	Trio, with Paul Chambers and Butch Warren (bass; separately), Philly Joe Jones and Granville T. Hogan (drums; separately)
1961	Homecoming!	Riverside	Sextet, with Blue Mitchell (trumpet), Frank Foster and Jimmy Heath (tenor sax), Percy Heath (bass), Philly Joe Jones (drums); some tracks trio, with Percy Heath and Jones
1961	Hope-Full	Riverside	Solo piano; some tracks are duo, with Bertha Hope (piano)
1963	Sounds from Rikers Island	Audio Fidelity	Sextet on most tracks, with Lawrence Jackson (trumpet), John Gilmore (tenor sax), Freddie Douglas (soprano sax), Ronnie Boykins (bass), Philly Joe Jones (drums); Earl Coleman and Marcelle Daniels (vocals; separately) on some tracks
1966	Last Sessions – Volume One	Inner City	Trio, with John Ore (bass), Philly Joe Jones and Clifford Jarvis (drums; separately); released 1977
1966	Last Sessions – Volume Two	Inner City	Details as Last Sessions – Volume One

=== As sideman ===
Year recorded	Leader	Title	Label
1953	Lou Donaldson and Clifford Brown	New Faces New Sounds	Blue Note
1953	Lou Donaldson and Clifford Brown	Alternate Takes	Blue Note
1954	Lou Donaldson	Lou Donaldson Sextet, Vol. 2	Blue Note
1954	Sonny Rollins	Moving Out	Prestige
1956	Jackie McLean	Lights Out!	Prestige
1958	Curtis Counce	Exploring the Future	Dooto
1958	Curtis Counce	Sonority	Contemporary
1958	Harold Land	Jazz at The Cellar 1958	Lone Hill Jazz
1959	Harold Land	The Fox	Hifijazz

== See also ==
- Chamber jazz
- List of cool jazz and West Coast jazz musicians
- List of jazz genres
