= Pescara Jazz =

- Genre: Jazz
- Dates: July
- Locations: Pescara, Italy
- Coordinates: 42°27′28″N 14°14′05″E
- Years active: 1969–present
- Website: Official

Pescara Jazz is an international jazz festival that takes place every year in July in Pescara, Abruzzo, Italy.

When it started in 1969 it was the first Italian summer festival dedicated to jazz. Since 1981, the festival has take place every year. Performers have included Dave Brubeck, Natalie Cole, Chick Corea, Miles Davis, Duke Ellington, Bill Evans, Ella Fitzgerald, Stan Getz, Dizzie Gillespie, Herbie Hancock, Woody Herman, Wynton Marsalis, Pat Metheny, Charles Mingus, Oscar Peterson, Wayne Shorter, and Sarah Vaughan.
