= Cool jazz =

Sub-genre of jazz associated with the U.S. West Coast

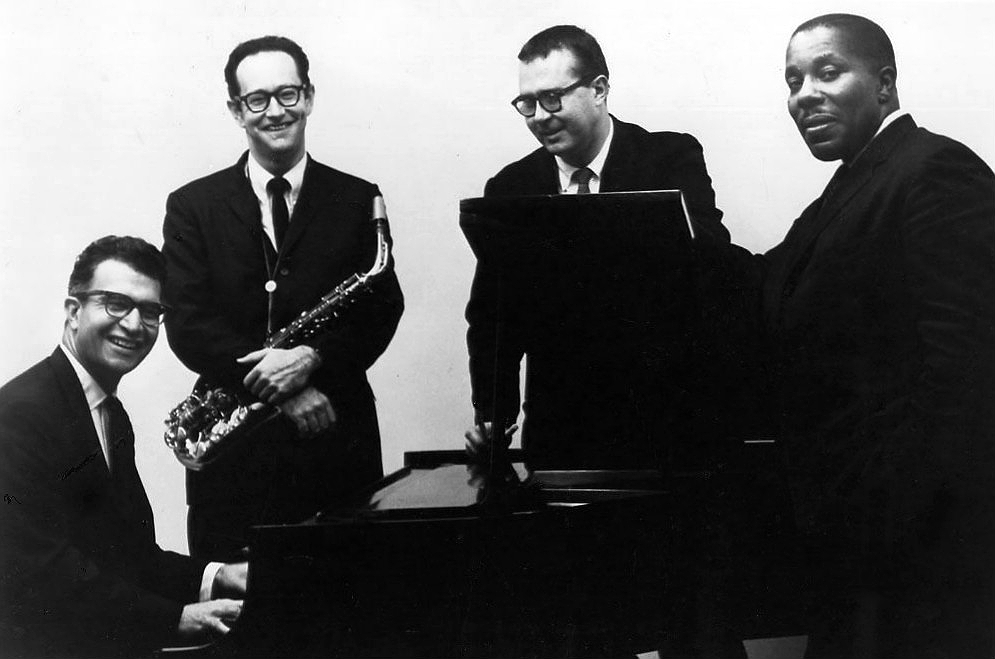
- Dave Brubeck Quartet in 1962
- Stylistic origins: Bebop; swing; classical; third stream
- Cultural origins: 1940s, United States
- Derivative forms: Modal jazz; straight-ahead jazz

Local scenes
- Los Angeles; New York City; San Francisco

Other topics
- West Coast jazz

Cool jazz is a style and genre of modern jazz music inspired by bebop and big band that arose in the United States after World War II. It is characterized by relaxed tempos and a lighter tone than that used in the fast and complex bebop style. Cool jazz often employs formal arrangements and incorporates elements of classical music. Broadly, the genre refers to a number of post-war jazz styles employing a more subdued approach than that of contemporaneous jazz idioms. As Paul Tanner, Maurice Gerow, and David Megill suggest, "the tonal sonorities of these conservative players could be compared to pastel colors, while the solos of [Dizzy] Gillespie and his followers could be compared to fiery red colors."

The term cool started being applied to this music around 1953, when Capitol Records released the album Classics in Jazz: Cool and Quiet. Mark C. Gridley, writing in the All Music Guide to Jazz, identifies four overlapping sub-categories of cool jazz:

1. "Soft variants of bebop," including the Miles Davis recordings that constitute Birth of the Cool; the complete works of the Modern Jazz Quartet; the output of Gerry Mulligan, especially his work with Chet Baker and Bob Brookmeyer; the music of Stan Kenton's sidemen during the late 1940s through the 1950s; and the works of George Shearing and Stan Getz.
2. The output of modern players who eschewed bebop in favor of advanced swing-era developments, including Lennie Tristano, Lee Konitz, and Warne Marsh; Dave Brubeck and Paul Desmond; and performers such as Jimmy Giuffre and Dave Pell who were influenced by Count Basie and Lester Young's small-group music.
3. Musicians from either of the previous categories who were active in California from the 1940s through the 1960s, developing what came to be known as West Coast jazz.
4. "Exploratory music with a subdued effect by Teddy Charles, Chico Hamilton, John LaPorta, and their colleagues during the 1950s."

== Characteristics ==
Cool jazz emerged as a reaction to bop, and is characterized by more moderate tempos and "a more reflective attitude". Ted Gioia and Lee Konitz have each identified cornetist Bix Beiderbecke and saxophonist Frankie Trumbauer as early progenitors of the cool aesthetic in jazz. Gioia cites Beiderbecke's softening of jazz's strong rhythmic impact in favor of maintaining melodic flow, while also employing complex techniques such as unusual harmonies and whole tone scales. Trumbauer, through "his smooth and seemingly effortless saxophone work," greatly affected tenor saxophonist Lester Young, who prefigured – and influenced – cool jazz more than any other musician.

Young's saxophone playing employed a light sound, in contrast to the "full-bodied" approach of players such as Coleman Hawkins. Young also had a tendency to play behind the beat, instead of driving it. He more strongly emphasized melodic development in his improvisation, rather than "hot" phrases or chord changes. While Young's style initially alienated some observers, the cool school embraced it. (Young would also influence bebop through Charlie Parker's emulation of Young's playing style.) Tanner, Gerow, and Megill point out that "cool developed gradually, as did previous styles." In addition to Lester Young's approach, cool had other antecedents:

Saxophonist Benny Carter underplayed his attacks, Teddy Wilson played the piano with a delicate touch, Benny Goodman stopped using the thick vibrato of Jimmy Noone and other clarinetists. Miles Davis's solo on Charlie Parker's "Chasin' the Bird" in 1947 and John Lewis's piano solo on Dizzie Gillespie's record of "'Round Midnight" in 1948 anticipated the Cool Era.

== History ==
Cool jazz emerged in the 1940s. Its stylistic origins can be traced to Claude Thornhill's big band, which utilized clarinets, French horns, and tubas.

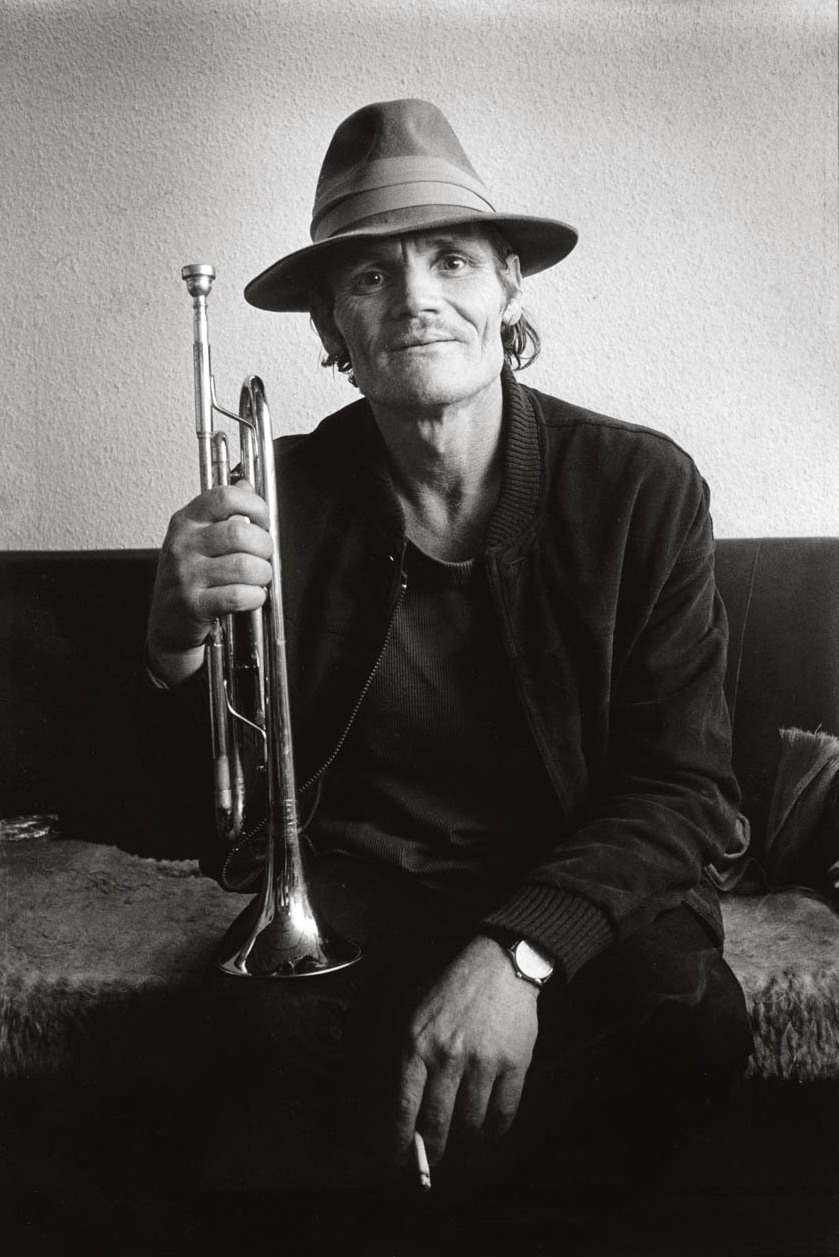
Chet Baker, known as the "Prince of Cool," 1983

In 1947, Woody Herman formed a band that included tenor saxophonists Stan Getz, Zoot Sims, and Herbie Steward, and baritone saxophonist Serge Chaloff. The result was the "Four Brothers" sound, in which four strong improvisers could still perform well as a coordinated, blended section. (Jimmy Giuffre composed "Four Brothers", which highlighted this group.) The Herman band's recording of "Early Autumn" launched Getz's career. Meanwhile, between 1946 and 1949, baritone saxophonist and arranger Gerry Mulligan, arranger Gil Evans, and alto saxophonist Lee Konitz were all working in Thornhill's band.

In 1948, Miles Davis formed a nonet including Mulligan, Konitz, and Evans from Thornhill's orchestra. Capitol Records recorded the group (at arranger Pete Rugolo's suggestion) in 1949 and 1950. These recordings, originally issued as 78 rpm records, were later compiled as Birth of the Cool (1957). Gerry Mulligan explained that the idea behind Davis's Nonet was not to get away from bebop, but "just to try to get a good little rehearsal band together. Something to write for.... As far as the 'Cool Jazz' part of it, all of that comes after the fact of what it was designed to be." As for Davis, his concern at the time was simply to play with a lighter sound, which he believed to be more expressive. Also his choice of notes suggested deliberation rather than wild exuberance.

The Miles Davis Nonet's existence was brief, consisting only of a two-week September 1948 engagement at the Manhattan's Royal Roost and the three recording dates that make up Birth of the Cool. These recordings were not widely appreciated until some years later. However, they prefigured the work of nonet members John Lewis and Gerry Mulligan.

John Lewis went on to co-found the Modern Jazz Quartet, who incorporated classical forms, such as the fugue, in their music. Tanner, Gerow, and Megill note that the Quartet "played classical forms quite precisely. For example, the fugues they played were truly baroque in form except that the exposition parts were improvised." While third stream music would combine classical elements with jazz, the Modern Jazz Quartet used these forms "just to play good, swinging, subtle jazz" and in pursuit of "the joy of collective improvisation and counterpoint."

Gerry Mulligan, with Chet Baker, formed a pianoless quartet that was both innovative and successful. Later, Mulligan formed a "Tentette" that further developed the ideas he had brought to the Birth of the Cool nonet.

George Shearing's quintet, which used a more subtle bebop style, also influenced cool's development. Both Thelonious Monk and Dizzy Gillespie praised Shearing's approach.

While Davis, Lewis, Mulligan, and Shearing's efforts were rooted in bebop, other musicians were less indebted to that style. In New York, pianist Lennie Tristano and saxophonist Lee Konitz developed a "somewhat atonal cerebral alternative to bop which concentrated on linear improvisation and interweaving rhythmic complexities". In California, Dave Brubeck hired alto saxophonist Paul Desmond, forming a quartet. Both Konitz and Desmond used an approach that ran counter to bebop, in the sense that neither player employed a sound or style heavily indebted to Charlie Parker (or Parker's blues elements). In a 2013 interview, Konitz noted that "the blues never connected with me," and further explained "I knew and loved Charlie Parker and copied his bebop solos like everyone else. But I didn't want to sound like him. So I used almost no vibrato and played mostly in the higher register. That's the heart of my sound."

== West Coast jazz ==
In 1951, Stan Kenton disbanded his Innovations Orchestra in Los Angeles. Many of the musicians, some of whom had also played in Woody Herman's band, chose to remain in California. Trumpeter Shorty Rogers and drummer Shelly Manne were central figures among this group of musicians. Much of this activity centered on the Hermosa Beach Lighthouse Café, where bassist Howard Rumsey led a house band, the Lighthouse All-Stars.

Drummer Chico Hamilton led an ensemble that – unusually for a jazz group – included a cellist, Fred Katz. Tanner, Gerow, and Megill liken Hamilton's music to chamber music, and have noted that Hamilton's "subtle rhythmic control and use of different drum pitches and timbres" was well-suited for this style of music.

Tanner, Gerow, and Megill are largely dismissive of the term "West Coast jazz." As it often refers to Gerry Mulligan and his associates in California, "west coast" merely becomes synonymous with "cool," although Lester Young, Claude Thornhill, and Miles Davis were based in New York. At the same time, many musicians associated with West Coast jazz "were much more involved in a hotter approach to jazz. Communication being what it is, it is hardly likely that any style of jazz was fostered exclusively in one area."

== Legacy ==
In 1959, The Dave Brubeck Quartet recorded Time Out, which reached No. 2 on the Billboard "Pop Albums" chart. The cool influence stretches into such later developments as bossa nova, modal jazz (especially in the form of Davis's Kind of Blue (1959)), and even free jazz (in the form of Jimmy Giuffre's 1961–1962 trio).

Following their work on Birth of the Cool, Miles Davis and Gil Evans would again collaborate on albums such as Miles Ahead, Porgy and Bess, and Sketches of Spain.

Some observers saw the subsequent hard bop style as a response to cool and West Coast jazz. Conversely, David H. Rosenthal sees the development of hard bop as a response to both a perceived decline in bebop and the rise of rhythm and blues. Shelly Manne suggested that cool jazz and hard bop simply reflected their respective geographic environments: the relaxed cool jazz style reflected a more relaxed lifestyle in California, while driving bop typified the New York scene.

Ted Gioia has noted that some of the artists associated with the ECM label during the 1970s are direct stylistic heirs of cool jazz. While these musicians may not sound similar to earlier cool artists, they share the same values:

clarity of expression; subtlety of meaning; a willingness to depart from the standard rhythms of hot jazz and learn from other genres of music; a preference for emotion rather than mere emoting; progressive ambitions and a tendency to experiment; above all, a dislike for bombast.

Gioia also identifies cool's influence upon other idioms, such as new-age, minimalism, pop, folk, and world music.

Cool also inspired avant-garde jazz and, later, free jazz.

== See also ==
- Chamber jazz
- List of cool jazz and West Coast jazz musicians
- List of jazz genres
