= Philly Joe Jones =

American jazz drummer (1923–1985)

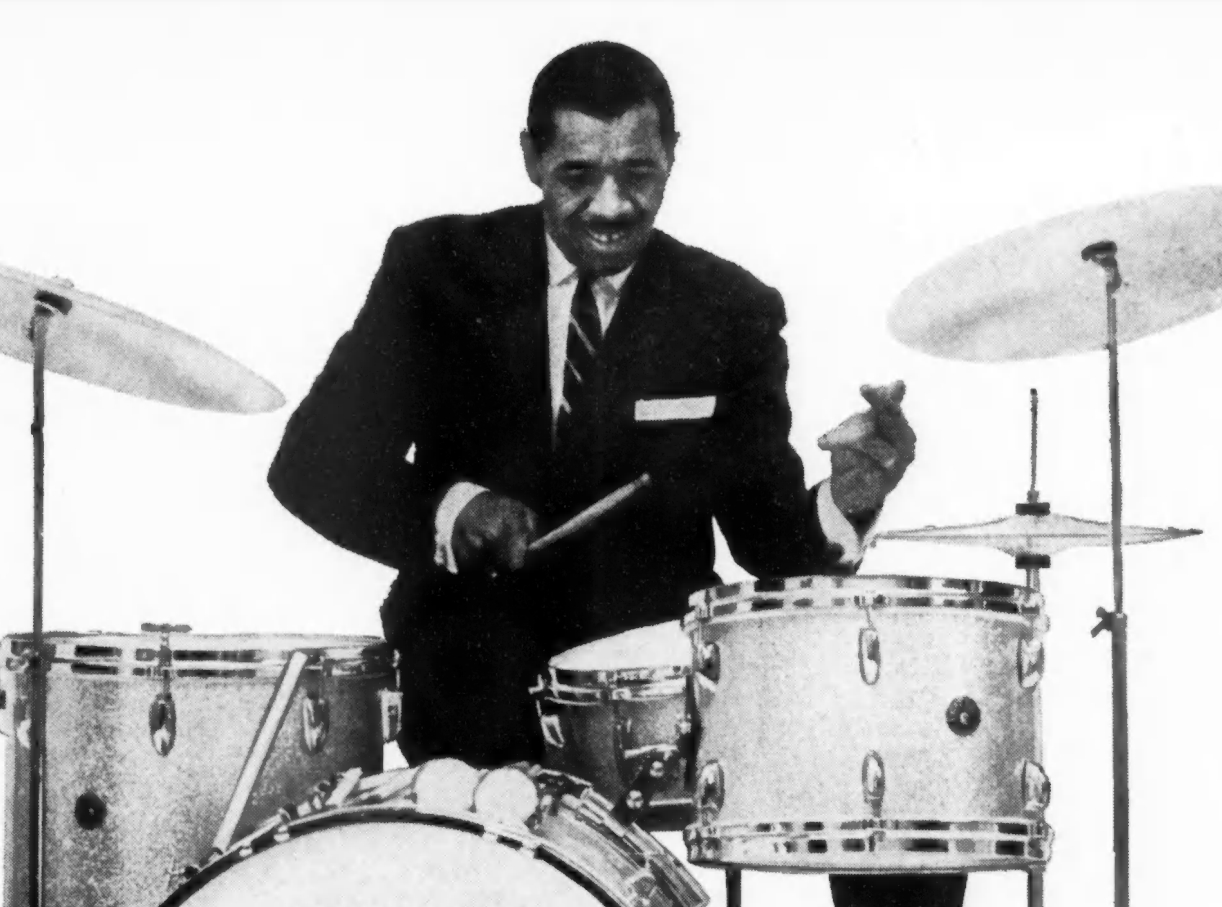
- Jones in 1960

Background information
- Born: Joseph Rudolph Jones; July 15, 1923; Philadelphia, Pennsylvania, U.S.
- Died: August 30, 1985 (aged 62) Philadelphia, Pennsylvania, U.S.
- Genres: Jazz; hard bop; bebop; cool jazz; modal
- Occupation: Musician
- Instrument: Drums
- Years active: 1940s–1985

Joseph Rudolph "Philly Joe" Jones (July 15, 1923 – August 30, 1985) was an American jazz drummer. He performed with Miles Davis and Bill Evans and was noted for being able to adjust his style of playing to allow for any group or individual's needs. The "Philly" moniker referenced his hometown of Philadelphia and originated to avoid confusion with the older drummer Papa Jo Jones.

== Biography ==
=== Early career ===
As a child, Jones appeared as a featured tap dancer on The Kiddie Show on the Philadelphia radio station WIP. He was in the US Army during World War II.

In 1947 he became the house drummer at Café Society in New York City, where he played with the leading bebop players of the day, including Tadd Dameron. From 1955 to 1958, Jones toured and recorded with the Miles Davis Quintet – a band that became known as "the Quintet" (along with Red Garland on piano, John Coltrane on sax, and Paul Chambers on bass). Davis acknowledged that Jones was his favorite drummer, and stated in his autobiography that he would always listen for Jones in other drummers.

From 1958, Jones worked as a leader, but continued to work as a sideman with other musicians, including Bill Evans and Hank Mobley. Evans, like Davis, also openly stated that Jones was his all-time favorite drummer.

=== Europe ===
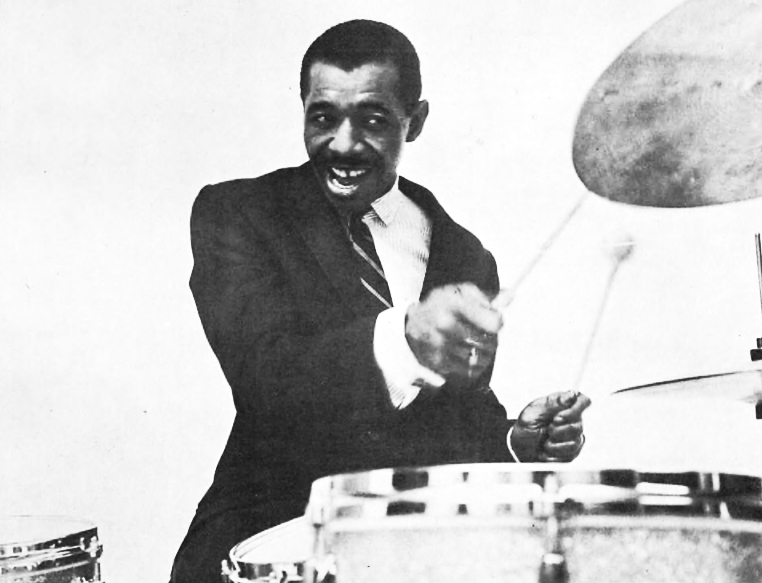
Jones in a 1964 Gretsch advertisement

Between late 1967 and 1972 Jones lived in London and Paris, performing and recording with musicians including Archie Shepp, Mal Waldron and Hank Mobley. For two years (1967–1969) Jones taught at a specially organized school in Hampstead, London, but was prevented from otherwise working in the UK by the Musicians' Union. His 1968 album Mo' Joe (also released as Trailways Express) was recorded in London with local musicians (including Peter King, Harold McNair, Chris Pyne, Kenny Wheeler and others).

=== Later years ===
Jones toured with Bill Evans in 1976 and 1978, recorded for Galaxy in 1977–1979, and made studio and live recordings with Red Garland in 1977. In 1981, Jones helped to found the group Dameronia, dedicated to the music of the composer Tadd Dameron, and led it until Jones' death from a heart attack in 1985.

== Discography ==
=== As leader/co-leader ===
Recording date	Title / Co-leader	Label	Year released	Notes
1958-09-17	Blues for Dracula	Riverside	1958	Johnny Griffin on tenor sax
1959-05-04, -11, -28	Drums Around the World	Riverside	1959	Benny Golson on tenor sax
1959-11-17, -18	Showcase	Riverside	1959	Bill Barron on tenor sax
1960-05-20	Philly Joe's Beat	Atlantic	1960	Bill Barron on tenor sax
1961-02-02	Together! with Elvin Jones	Atlantic	1961	Hank Mobley on tenor sax
1968-10-01, -31	Trailways Express also released as Mo Joe and Gone, Gone, Gone	Black Lion	1971	Harold McNair on tenor sax & flute
1969-01-31, 1969-03-01	Philly Joe Jones Avec Jef Gilson Et Son Ensemble with the Jef Gilson Ensemble	Disques Vogue	1969	
1969-07-18	Round Midnight	Lotus	1980	Bent Jædig on tenor sax, Live
1969-11-29, -30, 1969-12-01	Archie Shepp & Philly Joe Jones with Archie Shepp	America	1969	Archie Shepp on tenor sax & piano
1977-04-06, -07	Mean What You Say	Sonet	1977	Charles Bowen on soprano & tenor saxes
1977-11-29, -30, 1977-12-01	Philly Mignon	Galaxy	1978	Dexter Gordon or Ira Sullivan on tenor sax
1978-10-10 – -12	Drum Song	Galaxy	1985	Harold Land & Charles Bowen on tenor sax
1978-10-10 – -12	Advance!	Galaxy	1979	Harold Land & Charles Bowen on tenor sax
1981-06-19	Filet de Sole	Marge	1992	Philly Joe Jones Octet
1982-06-28	To Tadd with Love	Uptown	1982	Philly Joe Jones Dameronia
1983-07-11	Look Stop Listen	Uptown	1983	Philly Joe Jones Dameronia featuring Johnny Griffin

=== As sideman ===
With Chet Baker

- Chet Baker in New York (Riverside, 1959) – rec. 1958
- Chet Baker Introduces Johnny Pace with Johnny Pace (Riverside, 1959) – rec. 1958

With Sonny Clark

- Cool Struttin' (Blue Note, 1958)
- Sonny Clark Trio (Blue Note, 1958) – rec. 1957

With Miles Davis

- The Musings of Miles (Prestige, 1955)
- Miles: The New Miles Davis Quintet (Prestige, 1956)
- Cookin' with the Miles Davis Quintet (Prestige, 1956)
- Relaxin' with the Miles Davis Quintet (Prestige, 1956)
- Workin' with the Miles Davis Quintet (Prestige, 1956)
- Steamin' with the Miles Davis Quintet (Prestige, 1956)
- 'Round About Midnight (Columbia, 1957)
- Porgy and Bess (Columbia, 1958)
- Milestones (Columbia, 1958)

With Kenny Drew

- Kenny Drew Trio (Riverside, 1956)
- Pal Joey (Riverside, 1958) – rec. 1957

With Bill Evans

- 1958: Everybody Digs Bill Evans (Riverside, 1959)
- 1959: On Green Dolphin Street (Milestone, 1995)
- 1962: Interplay (Riverside, 1963)
- 1962: Loose Blues (Milestone, 1977)
- 1967: California Here I Come (Verve, 1982)
- 1976: Quintessence (Fantasy, 1977)

With Art Farmer

- Art Farmer Quintet featuring Gigi Gryce (Prestige, 1955)
- Brass Shout (United Artists, 1959)

With Red Garland

- Red's Good Groove (Jazzland, 1962)
- Keystones! (Xanadu, 1977)
- Crossings (Galaxy, 1978)

With Benny Golson

- The Other Side of Benny Golson (Riverside, 1958)
- Benny Golson and the Philadelphians (United Artists, 1958)

With Dexter Gordon

- Dexter Calling... (Blue Note, 1961)
- Landslide (Blue Note, 1980) – rec. 1961-1962

With Ernie Henry

- Seven Standards and a Blues (Riverside, 1957)
- Last Chorus (Riverside, 1956–1957)

With Elmo Hope

- The Elmo Hope Trio (Blue Note, 1953)
- Here's Hope! (Celebrity, 1961)
- High Hope! (Beacon, 1961)
- Homecoming! (Riverside, 1961)
- Sounds from Rikers Island (Audio Fidelity, 1963)
- The Final Sessions (Evidence, 1996) – rec. 1966

With Freddie Hubbard

- Goin' Up (Blue Note, 1960)
- Hub Cap (Blue Note, 1961)
- Here to Stay (Blue Note, 1962)

With Bobby Hutcherson

- Four Seasons (Timeless, 1985) – rec. 1983
- Good Bait (Landmark, 1985) – rec. 1984

With Duke Jordan

- Duke's Artistry (SteepleChase, 1978)
- The Great Session (SteepleChase, 1981) – rec. 1978

With Abbey Lincoln

- It's Magic (Riverside, 1958)
- Abbey Is Blue (Riverside, 1959)

With Herbie Mann

- Salute to the Flute (Epic, 1957)
- Herbie Mann's African Suite (United Artists, 1959)

With Howard McGhee

- The Return of Howard McGhee (Bethlehem, 1956) – rec. 1955. reissued as That Bop Thing (Bethlehem, 1978)

With Blue Mitchell

- Big 6 (Riverside, 1958)
- Smooth as the Wind (Riverside, 1961) – rec. 1960–1961

With Hank Mobley

- 1957: Hank (Blue Note, 1957)
- 1957: Poppin' (Blue Note, 1980)
- 1961: Workout (Blue Note, 1962)
- 1961: Another Workout (Blue Note, 1985)
- 1963: No Room for Squares (Blue Note, 1964)
- 1969: The Flip (Blue Note, 1970)

With Phineas Newborn Jr.

- Phineas' Rainbow (RCA Victor, 1956)
- A World of Piano! (Contemporary, 1961)

With Sonny Rollins

- Tenor Madness (Prestige, 1956)
- Newk's Time (Blue Note, 1957)

With Archie Shepp

- Blasé (BYG Actuel, 1969)
- Archie Shepp & Philly Joe Jones (America, 1969)

With Clark Terry

- Serenade to a Bus Seat (Riverside, 1957)
- In Orbit (Riverside, 1958)

With others

- Chris Anderson, Inverted Image (Jazzland, 1961)
- Evans Bradshaw, Look Out for Evans Bradshaw! (Riverside, 1958)
- Clifford Brown, Memorial Album (Blue Note, 1953)
- Kenny Burrell, Ellington Is Forever Volume Two (Fantasy, 1975)
- Joe Castro, Mood Jazz (Atlantic, 1957)
- Serge Chaloff, Blue Serge (Capitol, 1956)
- Paul Chambers, Go (Vee-Jay, 1959)
- John Coltrane, Blue Train (Blue Note, 1958)
- Bennie Green, Bennie Green with Art Farmer with Art Farmer (Prestige, 1956)
- Johnny Griffin, Way Out! (Riverside, 1959)
- Milt Jackson and Wes Montgomery, Bags Meets Wes! (Riverside, 1962)
- Clifford Jordan, The Rotterdam Session (Audio Daddio, 1985)
- Warne Marsh, Warne Marsh (Atlantic, 1958)
- Yoshiaki Miyanoue, Song for Wes (King Records, 1979)
- J. R. Monterose, J. R. Monterose (Blue Note, 1956)
- Art Pepper, Art Pepper Meets the Rhythm Section (Contemporary, 1957)
- Bud Powell, Time Waits (Blue Note, 1958)
- Jimmy Smith, Softly as a Summer Breeze (Blue Note, 1958)
- Sonny Stitt, Sonny Stitt & the Top Brass (Atlantic, 1962)
- The Manhattan Transfer, Vocalese (Atlantic, 1985)
- Ben Webster, Soulmates with Joe Zawinul (Riverside, 1963)
- Jack Wilson, The Two Sides of Jack Wilson (Atlantic, 1964)
- Phil Woods, Pairing Off (Prestige, 1956)
