= Thelonious Monk Quartet with John Coltrane at Carnegie Hall =

At Carnegie Hall

Live album by the Thelonious Monk Quartet with John Coltrane
- Released: September 27, 2005
- Recorded: November 29, 1957
- Venues: Carnegie Hall; New York City
- Genre: Jazz
- Length: 51:49
- Label: Blue Note
- Producers: Michael Cuscuna, T. S. Monk (restoration)

Thelonious Monk chronology
Mulligan Meets Monk (1957)	At Carnegie Hall (2005)	Thelonious in Action (1958)

John Coltrane chronology
The Olatunji Concert: The Last Live Recording (2001)	At Carnegie Hall (2005)	Live at the Half Note: One Down, One Up (2005)

Thelonious Monk Quartet with John Coltrane at Carnegie Hall is a live album by the Thelonious Monk Quartet, which included John Coltrane at the time. It was recorded at Carnegie Hall on November 29, 1957, and was released on September 27, 2005, by Blue Note.

== Background ==
=== Recording ===
It was recorded on 29 November 1957 at "Thanksgiving Jazz", a benefit concert produced by Kenneth Lee Karpe for the Morningside Community Center in Harlem. Other acts performing included Billie Holiday, Dizzy Gillespie, Ray Charles, Sonny Rollins, and Chet Baker with Zoot Sims. The recording, by Voice of America, documents two sets by the Monk Quartet with Coltrane that night—an early set (tracks 1–5) and a late set (tracks 6–9), which the recording does not fully document.

=== Preservation and Release ===
The tape of the performance was stored for decades at the Library of Congress with the rest of the Voice of America network recordings. In 2005, as part of routine processing of backlog recordings from that collection, the recording was digitized by a team supervised by Larry Appelbaum. The recording was then restored by producer Michael Cuscuna and T.S. Monk (Thelonious Monk's son).

== Reception ==
Professional ratings
Review scores
Source	Rating
All About Jazz	(favourable)
AllMusic	5/5 stars
The Encyclopedia of Popular Music	4/5 stars
The Penguin Guide to Jazz Recordings	+ crown
Robert Christgau	A
Rolling Stone	4/5 stars

The recording has been highly praised. Newsweek called it the "musical equivalent of the discovery of a new Mount Everest," and Amazon.com editorial reviewer Lloyd Sachs called it "the ultimate definition of a classic". Soon after its release, it became the #1 best selling music recording on Amazon.com.

The discovery substantially increased coverage of Monk and Coltrane's partnership. The only other recordings known to feature both performers are from four sessions that took place in April, June and July 1957 and were originally issued on Thelonious Monk with John Coltrane, Monk's Music and Thelonious Himself. The album Thelonious Monk: Live at the Five Spot: Discovery! presents another live performance by Monk's quartet and Coltrane; it was recorded in 1957 at the Five Spot Café in New York City.

== Track listing ==
All tracks are written by Thelonious Monk, except as noted.

No.	Title	Writer(s)	Length
1.	"Monk's Mood"		7:52
2.	"Evidence"		4:41
3.	"Crepuscule with Nellie"		4:26
4.	"Nutty"		5:03
5.	"Epistrophy"	Monk; Kenny Clarke	4:29
6.	"Bye-Ya"		6:31
7.	"Sweet and Lovely"	Gus Arnheim; Harry Tobias; Jules LeMare	9:34
8.	"Blue Monk"		6:31
9.	"Epistrophy" (Incomplete)		2:24

== Personnel ==
=== Thelonious Monk Quartet ===
- Thelonious Monk – piano
- John Coltrane – tenor saxophone
- Ahmed Abdul-Malik – bass
- Shadow Wilson – drums
