= Thelonious Alone in San Francisco =

1959 live solo album by Thelonious Monk

Live album by Thelonious Monk
- Released: 1959
- Recorded: October 21 and 22, 1959
- Venue: Fugazi Hall, San Francisco, CA
- Genre: Jazz
- Length: 40:25
- Label: Riverside
- Producer: Orrin Keepnews

Thelonious Monk chronology
5 by Monk by 5 (1959)	Thelonious Alone in San Francisco (1959)	Thelonious Monk at the Blackhawk (1960)

Professional ratings
Review scores
Source	Rating
AllMusic	4.5/5 stars
DownBeat	5/5 stars
The Encyclopedia of Popular Music	4/5 stars
The Penguin Guide to Jazz Recordings	4/4 stars
The Rolling Stone Jazz Record Guide	5/5 stars

Thelonious Alone in San Francisco is jazz pianist Thelonious Monk's third solo album, recorded in 1959. (Piano Solo, aka Solo 1954, recorded in Paris, and Thelonious Himself (1957), were Monk's previous forays into this form.)

It was recorded in Fugazi Hall, San Francisco, California, on October 21 and 22, 1959, but without an audience present.

"Bluehawk" and "Round Lights" were improvised blues which appeared only in these recorded versions. The other Monk compositions had appeared in prior recordings.

== Track listing ==
All songs by Thelonious Monk, unless otherwise indicated.

Side one

1. "Blue Monk" - 3:44
2. "Ruby, My Dear" - 3:56
3. "Round Lights" - 3:34
4. "Everything Happens to Me" (Tom Adair, Matt Dennis) - 5:37
5. "You Took the Words Right Out of My Heart" (Ralph Rainger, Leo Robin) - 4:01

Side two

1. "Bluehawk" - 3:37
2. "Pannonica" - 3:51
3. "Remember" (Irving Berlin) - 2:41
4. "There's Danger in Your Eyes, Cherie" (Jack Meskill, Harry Richman, Pete Wendling) - 4:18
5. "Reflections"- 5:06

== Personnel ==
- Thelonious Monk – piano
- Reice Hamel - recording engineer
