= Carmen Sings Monk =

Studio album by Carmen McRae
- Released: 1990
- Recorded: January 30 & February 1, 1988*; April 12 & 13, 1988**
- Venue: Great American Music Hall, San Francisco, CA*
- Studio: Clinton Recording Studio, New York**
- Genre: Vocal jazz
- Length: 65:02
- Label: Novus
- Producer: Larry Clothier

Carmen McRae chronology
Fine and Mellow: Live at Birdland West (1988)	Carmen Sings Monk (1990)	Sarah: Dedicated to You (1991)

Professional ratings
Review scores
Source	Rating
Allmusic	5/5 stars
Robert Christgau	A−

Carmen Sings Monk is a 1990 studio album by the American jazz singer Carmen McRae, focusing exclusively on the songs composed by Thelonious Monk. It was one of the last recordings released in her lifetime. McRae was accompanied by Clifford Jordan on soprano and tenor saxophone, and a rhythm section with pianist Eric Gunnison, bassist George Mraz and Al Foster on drums. Two songs, namely "Get It Straight" and "Suddenly" (i.e. "In Walked Bud"), were recorded earlier that year live at the Great American Music Hall in San Francisco with tenor saxophonist Charlie Rouse, who played the longest time with Monk. The rhythm section was almost the same, then with Larry Willis on piano.

McRae was nominated for the Grammy Award for Best Jazz Vocal Performance, Female at the 33rd Annual Grammy Awards for her performance on this album.

== Release history ==
The album was originally released in 1990 on Novus Records (on CD, LP and MC), the first of four subsequent recordings by McRae released on the BMG sublabel, before Novus became defunct in the mid-1990s. McRae herself only saw the release of the following Sarah: Dedicated to You, she died in 1994. The recording was reissued three years later on Jazz Heritage, and re-released in 2001 on Bluebird in their First Editions series, another BMG subsidiary, with three additional alternate takes of the studion session (the recording dates could also finally be specified). After BMG and Sony America merged (as Sony BMG) and split again, Carmen Sings Monk was reissued in 2017, this time by Sony/Legacy.

== Track listing ==
All music composed by Thelonious Monk, lyricists indicated.
Due to copyright restrictions the song titles of these standards were modified (with the exception of "'Round Midnight"). Monk's original titles are indicated after the track titles.

1. "Get It Straight" ("Straight, No Chaser") (Sally Swisher) – 3:58
2. "Dear Ruby" ("Ruby, My Dear") (Swisher) – 6:01
3. "It's Over Now" ("Well, You Needn't") (Mike Ferro) – 5:28
4. "Monkery's the Blues" ("Blue Monk") (Abbey Lincoln) – 4:56
5. "You Know Who" ("I Mean You") (Coleman Hawkins, Jon Hendricks) – 3:31
6. "Little Butterfly" ("Pannonica") (Hendricks) – 5:15
7. "Listen to Monk" ("Rhythm-a-Ning") (Hendricks) – 3:05
8. "How I Wish" ("Ask Me Now") (Hendricks) – 4:56
9. "Man, That Was a Dream" ("Monk's Dream") (Hendricks) – 2:55
10. "'Round Midnight" (Monk, Cootie Williams, Bernie Hanighen) – 6:32
11. "Still We Dream" ("Ugly Beauty") (Ferro) – 3:27
12. "Suddenly" ("In Walked Bud") (Hendricks) – 3:41
13. "Looking Back" ("Reflections") (Hendricks) – 5:35

Tracks on original CD release, but omitted on LP and MC

14. "Suddenly" (Hendricks) – 3:13
15. "Get It Straight" (Swisher) – 3:26

Previously unreleased, alternate takes added since 2001 reissue

16. "'Round Midnight" (Alternate Version) – 7:11
17. "Listen to Monk" (Alternate Take) – 2:59
18. "Man, That Was a Dream" (Alternate Take) – 3:23

== Personnel ==
- Carmen McRae - vocals
- Clifford Jordan - soprano saxophone, tenor saxophone
- Eric Gunnison - piano
- George Mraz - double bass
- Al Foster - drums

Live at Great American Music Hall on January 30 & February 1, 1988 (tracks 1 & 12)

- Charlie Rouse - tenor saxophone
- Larry Willis - piano
- George Mraz - double bass
- Al Foster - drums
