= Monk in France =

Live album by Thelonious Monk
- Released: 1965
- Recorded: April 18th, 1961
- Genre: Jazz
- Length: 52:04
- Label: Riverside
- Producer: Orrin Keepnews

Thelonious Monk chronology
Thelonious Monk at the Blackhawk (1960)	Monk in France (1961, rel. 1965)	Thelonious Monk in Italy (1961, rel. 1963)

Professional ratings
Review scores
Source	Rating
Allmusic	2.5/5 stars
The Penguin Guide to Jazz Recordings	3/4 stars

Monk in France is an album by jazz pianist Thelonious Monk, recorded on April 18, 1961. The remastered album includes two bonus tracks, "Body and Soul" and "Crepuscule with Nellie."

== Track listing ==
All songs by Thelonious Monk unless otherwise noted

Side one

1. "Well You Needn't" – 11:30
2. "Off Minor" – 11:41
3. "Just a Gigolo" (Irving Caesar, Leonello Casucci, Julius Brammer) – 1:42

Side two

1. "I Mean You" (Monk, Coleman Hawkins) – 11:02
2. "Hackensack" – 9:46
3. "I'm Getting Sentimental over You" (Ned Washington, George Bassman) – 8:30

1995 reissue bonus tracks

1. "Body and Soul" (Edward Heyman, Robert Sour, Frank Eyton, Johnny Green) – 2:48
2. "Crepuscule with Nellie" – 2:39

== Personnel ==
- Thelonious Monk – piano
- John Ore – bass
- Charlie Rouse – Tenor Saxophone
- Frankie Dunlop – Drums
