= Genius of Modern Music, Vols. One & Two =

Genius of Modern Music
- Volume 1

Compilation album by Thelonious Monk
- Released: 1956; 1989/2001
- Recorded: October 15, 1947; October 24, 1947; November 21, 1947; July 2, 1948; July 23, 1951; May 30, 1952
- Studios: WOR, New York City
- Genre: Jazz
- Label: Blue Note
- Producer: Alfred Lion

Genius of Modern Music
- Volume 2

Genius of Modern Music, Vols. One & Two are a pair of separate but related 12" compilation albums (LPs) by American jazz pianist Thelonious Monk released on Blue Note in 1956. Later re-issues on CD include more material recorded at the same sessions but not released on the original LPs.

== Background ==
Professional ratings
Review scores
Source	Rating
AllMusic (Vol. One)	5/5 stars
AllMusic (Vol. Two)	5/5 stars
The Encyclopedia of Popular Music (Vol. One)	5/5 stars
The Encyclopedia of Popular Music (Vol. Two)	5/5 stars
Penguin Guide to Jazz (Vol. One)	👑

=== Recording and production ===
Monk recorded six sessions for Blue Note, all produced by Alfred Lion: October 15 and 24, 1947, November 21, 1947, July 2, 1948, July 23, 1951, and May 30, 1952. All sessions were recorded by Doug Hawkins at WOR Studios, except July 2, 1948, recorded at Apex Studios.

=== Release history ===
Two 10"s were cut from the first five sessions: Genius of Modern Music (1951) and Genius of Modern Music, Vol. 2 (1952). After 10"s lost the format war, Blue Note began reissuing its Modern Jazz Series on 12"s. Material from the two ten-inches, the 1952 session, and other outtakes were recompiled on Genius of Modern Music, Vol. One (BLP 1510) and Genius of Modern Music, Vol. Two (BLP 1511).

The two volumes were recompiled for their CD reissue, moving the entire July 2, 1948 session to the Milt Jackson: Wizard of the Vibes reissue, and placing the other five sessions (with outtakes) in chronological order, with the 1947 sessions on Volume One and the 1951 and 1952 sessions on Volume Two.

== Track listing ==
=== Genius of Modern Music, Volume One – BLP 1510 ===
All tracks are written by Thelonious Monk, except as noted.

Side 1
No.	Title	Writer(s)	Date recorded	Length
1.	"Round About Midnight"		November 21, 1947
2.	"Off Minor"		October 24, 1947
3.	"Ruby My Dear"		October 24, 1947
4.	"I Mean You"	Monk; Coleman Hawkins	July 2, 1948
5.	"April in Paris"	Vernon Duke	October 24, 1947
6.	"In Walked Bud"		November 21, 1947

Side 2
No.	Title	Writer(s)	Date recorded	Length
1.	"Thelonious"		October 15, 1947
2.	"Epistrophy"	Monk; Kenny Clarke	July 2, 1948
3.	"Misterioso"		July 2, 1948
4.	"Well You Needn't"		October 24, 1947
5.	"Introspection"		October 24, 1947
6.	"Humph"		October 15, 1947

=== Genius of Modern Music, Volume Two – BLP 1511 ===
All tracks are written by Thelonious Monk, except as noted.

Side 1
No.	Title	Writer(s)	Date recorded	Length
1.	"Carolina Moon"	Benny Davis; Joe Burke	May 30, 1952
2.	"Hornin' In"		May 30, 1952
3.	"Skippy"		May 30, 1952
4.	"Let's Cool One"		May 30, 1952
5.	"Suburban Eyes"	Ike Quebec	October 15, 1947
6.	"Evonce"	Quebec; Idrees Sulieman	October 15, 1947

Side 2
No.	Title	Writer(s)	Date recorded	Length
1.	"Straight, No Chaser"		July 23, 1951
2.	"Four in One"		July 23, 1951
3.	"Nice Work (If You Can Get It)"	George Gershwin; Ira Gershwin	October 24, 1947
4.	"Monk's Mood"		November 21, 1947
5.	"Who Knows?"		November 21, 1947
6.	"Ask Me Now"		July 23, 1951

=== CD reissues ===
All tracks are written by Thelonious Monk.

Genius of Modern Music, Volume 1
No.	Title	Date recorded	Length
1.	"Humph"	October 15, 1947
2.	"Evonce" (alternate take)	October 15, 1947
3.	"Evonce"	October 15, 1947
4.	"Suburban Eyes"	October 15, 1947
5.	"Suburban Eyes" (alternate take)	October 15, 1947
6.	"Thelonious"	October 15, 1947
7.	"Nice Work If You Can Get It" (alternate take)	October 24, 1947
8.	"Nice Work If You Can Get It"	October 24, 1947
9.	"Ruby My Dear" (alternate take)	October 24, 1947
10.	"Ruby My Dear"	October 24, 1947
11.	"Well You Needn't"	October 24, 1947
12.	"Well You Needn't" (alternate take)	October 24, 1947
13.	"April in Paris" (alternate take)	October 24, 1947
14.	"April in Paris"	October 24, 1947
15.	"Off Minor"	October 24, 1947
16.	"Introspection"	October 24, 1947
17.	"In Walked Bud"	November 21, 1947
18.	"Monk's Mood"	November 21, 1947
19.	"Who Knows"	November 21, 1947
20.	"'Round Midnight"	November 21, 1947
21.	"Who Knows" (alternate take)	November 21, 1947

All tracks are written by Thelonious Monk, except as noted.

Genius of Modern Music, Volume 2
No.	Title	Writer(s)	Date recorded	Length
1.	"Four in One"		July 23, 1951
2.	"Four in One" (alternate take)		July 23, 1951
3.	"Criss Cross"		July 23, 1951
4.	"Criss Cross" (alternate take)		July 23, 1951
5.	"Eronel"	Monk; Sulieman; Sadik Hakim	July 23, 1951
6.	"Straight, No Chaser"		July 23, 1951
7.	"Ask Me Now" (alternate take)		July 23, 1951
8.	"Ask Me Now"		July 23, 1951
9.	"Willow Weep for Me"	Ann Ronnell	July 23, 1951
10.	"Skippy"		May 30, 1952
11.	"Skippy" (alternate take)		May 30, 1952
12.	"Hornin' In" (alternate take)		May 30, 1952
13.	"Hornin' In"		May 30, 1952
14.	"Sixteen" (first take)		May 30, 1952
15.	"Sixteen" (second take)		May 30, 1952
16.	"Carolina Moon"	Davis, Burke	May 30, 1952
17.	"Let's Cool One"		May 30, 1952
18.	"I'll Follow You"	Roy Turk; Fred E. Ahlert	May 30, 1952

=== Note ===
- The CD issues compile the five sessions—excluding July 2, 1948, concurrently reissued on Milt Jackson: Wizard of the Vibes—chronologically. The 2001 RVG edition recompiled the track listing, postpending the alternate takes to their respective sessions, and restored the cover art for the original 10" LPs.

== Personnel ==
=== Musicians ===
==== October 15, 1947 ====
- Thelonious Monk – piano
- Idrees Sulieman – trumpet
- Danny Quebec West – alto saxophone
- Billy Smith – tenor saxophone
- Gene Ramey – bass
- Art Blakey – drums

==== October 24, 1947 ====
- Thelonious Monk – piano
- Gene Ramey – bass
- Art Blakey – drums

==== November 21, 1947 ====
- Thelonious Monk – piano
- George Taitt – trumpet
- Sahib Shihab – alto saxophone
- Bob Paige – bass
- Art Blakey – drums

==== July 2, 1948 ====
- Milt Jackson – vibraphone
- Thelonious Monk – piano
- John Simmons – bass
- Shadow Wilson – drums

==== July 23, 1951 ====
- Thelonious Monk – piano
- Sahib Shihab – alto saxophone (except "Ask Me Now")
- Milt Jackson – vibraphone (except "Ask Me Now")
- Al McKibbon – bass
- Art Blakey – drums

==== May 30, 1952 ====
- Thelonious Monk – piano
- Kenny Dorham – trumpet
- Lou Donaldson – alto saxophone
- Lucky Thompson – tenor saxophone
- Nelson Boyd – bass
- Max Roach – drums

=== Technical personnel ===
==== Original ====
- Alfred Lion – producer
- Doug Hawkins – engineer
- Ira Gitler – liner notes

==== Reissue ====
- Michael Cuscuna – reissue producer
- Ron McMaster – digital transfer
