= Big Band and Quartet in Concert =

Live album by Thelonious Monk
- Released: March 1964
- Recorded: December 30, 1963
- Venue: Philharmonic Hall, Manhattan
- Genre: Jazz
- Length: 59:10
- Label: Columbia
- Producer: Teo Macero

Thelonious Monk chronology
Criss-Cross (1963)	Big Band and Quartet in Concert (1964)	Miles & Monk at Newport (1964)

Professional ratings
Review scores
Source	Rating
AllMusic	5/5 stars
The Penguin Guide to Jazz Recordings	3.5/4 stars
The Rolling Stone Jazz Record Guide	4/5 stars

Big Band and Quartet in Concert is a live album by American jazz musician Thelonious Monk, released in March 1964 by Columbia Records. Recorded at the Lincoln Center's Philharmonic Hall on December 30, 1963, it features a large ensemble with 10 musicians, including the four members of the Thelonious Monk Quartet and six additional brass and reed players. Like the earlier The Thelonious Monk Orchestra at Town Hall album, the large ensemble pieces were arranged by Hall Overton.

Monk toured Europe in 1967 with a similar ensemble and played many of the same pieces featured on Big Band and Quartet in Concert. Recordings of a Paris concert with the 1967 group were later released as Thelonious Monk Nonet Live in Paris 1967.

Big Band and Quartet in Concert was called by reviewer Scott Yanow "essential for all jazz collections".

== Track listing ==
=== 1964 LP ===
Side one
No.	Title	Writer(s)	Length
1.	"I Mean You"	Thelonious Monk; Coleman Hawkins	12:42
2.	"Evidence"	Monk	12:38
3.	"(When It's) Darkness on the Delta"	Al J. Neiburg; Jerry Livingston; Marty Symes	5:03

Side two
No.	Title	Writer(s)	Length
4.	"Oska T."	Monk	9:20
5.	"Played Twice"	Monk	6:24
6.	"Four in One"	Monk	11:03
7.	"Epistrophy"	Monk; Kenny Clarke	2:00
Total length:			59:10

=== 1994 CD reissue ===
The 1994 reissue on CD and LP restored the entire concert, including selections and drum solos left off the original 1964 release.

Disc one
No.	Title	Note	Length
1.	"Bye-Ya"		11:23
2.	"I Mean You"		12:49
3.	"Evidence"		14:03
4.	"Epistrophy"		2:07
5.	"(When It's) Darkness on the Delta"	solo piano	5:15
6.	"Played Twice"	quartet	7:48

Disc two
No.	Title	Note	Length
7.	"Misterioso"	quartet	9:52
8.	"Epistrophy"	quartet	1:18
9.	"Light Blue"		12:53
10.	"Oska T"		13:18
11.	"Four in One"		14:43
12.	"Epistrophy"		2:23

== Personnel ==
- Thelonious Monk - piano
- Nick Travis - trumpet
- Thad Jones - cornet
- Eddie Bert - trombone
- Steve Lacy - soprano saxophone
- Phil Woods - alto saxophone, clarinet
- Charlie Rouse - tenor saxophone
- Gene Allen - baritone saxophone, bass clarinet, clarinet
- Butch Warren - bass
- Frankie Dunlop - drums

Hall Overton arranged all pieces played by the larger ensemble.

=== Quartet ===
- Charlie Rouse - tenor saxophone
- Butch Warren - bass
- Frankie Dunlop - drums
