= Thelonious Monk with John Coltrane =

Studio album by Thelonious Monk
- Released: ca. October 1961
- Recorded: April 16, 1957; June 25–26, 1957; July, 1957
- Studios: Reeves, New York City
- Genre: Hard bop
- Length: 37:37
- Label: Jazzland
- Producer: Orrin Keepnews

Thelonious Monk chronology
Thelonious Monk at the Blackhawk (1960)	Thelonious Monk with John Coltrane (1961)	Monk's Dream (1963)

Professional ratings
Review scores
Source	Rating
AllMusic	5/5 stars
DownBeat	5/5 stars
The Encyclopedia of Popular Music	4/5 stars
The Penguin Guide to Jazz Recordings	4/4 stars
The Rolling Stone Jazz Record Guide	5/5 stars

Thelonious Monk with John Coltrane is a 1961 studio album by the American jazz pianist Thelonious Monk issued on Jazzland Records, a subsidiary of Riverside Records. It consists of material recorded in 1957, when Monk worked extensively with John Coltrane, but was only issued after Coltrane had become a prominent bandleader and composer himself.

The original LP was assembled by the label with material from three different sessions. The impetus for the album was the discovery of three usable studio tracks recorded by the Thelonious Monk Quartet with Coltrane in July 1957, at the beginning of the band's six-month residency at the Five Spot Café in Greenwich Village. To round out the release, producer Orrin Keepnews included two outtakes from the June 1957 sessions for Monk's Music and one outtake from Thelonious Himself recorded in April 1957.

The album was reissued on CD in 2000 by Fantasy Records; a take of "Monk's Mood" from the Thelonious Himself sessions was added as a bonus track. It was inducted into the Grammy Hall of Fame in 2007.

== Track listing ==
All compositions by Thelonious Monk, except "Epistrophy" by Monk and Kenny Clarke.

Side one

1. “Ruby, My Dear” – 6:17
2. “Trinkle, Tinkle” – 6:37
3. “Off Minor [take 4]” – 5:10

Side two

4. “Nutty” – 6:35
5. “Epistrophy” – 3:07
6. “Functional [take 1]” – 9:46

CD reissue bonus track

7. "Monk's Mood" – 7:52

Sessions

- Track 1, 2 and 4 recorded July 1957
- Tracks 3 and 5 recorded June 26, 1957 (Monk's Music session outtakes)
- Track 6 and 7 recorded April 12, 1957 (Thelonious Himself session outtakes)

== Personnel ==
- Thelonious Monk – piano
- John Coltrane – tenor saxophone (tracks 1–5, 7)
- Ray Copeland – trumpet (tracks 3 and 5)
- Gigi Gryce – alto saxophone (tracks 3 and 5)
- Coleman Hawkins – tenor saxophone (tracks 3 and 5)
- Wilbur Ware – double bass (tracks 1–5, 7)
- Shadow Wilson – drums (tracks 1, 2, 4)
- Art Blakey – drums (tracks 3 and 5)
