= Monk in Tokyo =

Live album by Thelonious Monk
- Released: 1963
- Recorded: May 21, 1963, in Tokyo, Japan
- Genre: Jazz
- Length: 80:58
- Label: Sony

Thelonious Monk chronology
Criss Cross (1963)	Monk in Tokyo (1963)	Miles & Monk at Newport (1964)

Professional ratings
Review scores
Source	Rating
AllMusic	4.5/5 stars
The Penguin Guide to Jazz Recordings	3.5/4 stars
The Rolling Stone Jazz Record Guide	4/5 stars

Monk in Tokyo is a live album recorded in 1963 and first released in Japan by Columbia Records as two separate LPs in 1963 (PSS 46 "In Tokyo 1" and PSS 47 "In Tokyo 2"), then in edited form as a single LP in 1969 by CBS/Sony Records and reissued in complete form as a double LP in 1973, featuring several original Monk compositions, as well as jazz standards.

== Track listing ==
All tracks are written by Thelonious Monk except where noted.

Disc one:

1. "Straight, No Chaser" - 9:46
2. "Pannonica" - 7:46
3. "Just a Gigolo" (Julius Brammer, Irving Caesar, Leonello Casucci) - 2:30
4. "Evidence (Justice)" - 7:55
5. "Jackie-ing" - 5:07
6. "Bemsha Swing" (Denzil Best, Thelonious Monk) - 4:25
7. "Epistrophy [theme]" (Kenny Clarke, Monk) - 1:10

Disc two:

1. "I'm Getting Sentimental Over You" (George Bassman, Ned Washington) - 9:28
2. "Hackensack" - 11:03
3. "Blue Monk" - 13:18
4. "Epistrophy" (Clarke, Monk) - 8:25

== Personnel ==
- Thelonious Monk – piano
- Charlie Rouse - tenor saxophone
- Butch Warren – bass
- Frankie Dunlop – drums
