= Misterioso (Recorded on Tour) =

Live album by Thelonious Monk
- Released: 1965
- Genre: Jazz
- Label: Columbia
- Producer: Teo Macero

Thelonious Monk chronology
Live at the Jazz Workshop (1964)	Misterioso (Recorded on Tour) (1965)	Straight, No Chaser (1967)

Professional ratings
Review scores
Source	Rating
DownBeat	3.5/5 stars

Misterioso (Recorded on Tour) is a live album by Thelonious Monk, released for Columbia Records. It was recorded at various locations on tour.

== Track listing ==
All tracks composed by Thelonious Monk; except where indicated

Side A

1. "Well, You Needn't" – 7:50
2. "Misterioso" – 9:40
3. "Light Blue" – 5:38
4. "I'm Gettin' Sentimental over You" (Ned Washington, George Bassman) – 5:44

Side B

1. "All the Things You Are" (Oscar Hammerstein II, Jerome Kern) – 6:46
2. "Honeysuckle Rose" (Andy Razaf, Fats Waller) – 4:40
3. "Bemsha Swing" (Thelonious Monk, Denzil Best) – 4:10
4. "Evidence" – 7:50

== Personnel ==
- Thelonious Monk – piano
- Charlie Rouse – tenor saxophone
- Butch Warren – bass on "Misterioso", "Light Blue" and "Evidence"
- Frank Dunlop – drums on "Misterioso", "Light Blue" and "Evidence"
- Larry Gales – bass on "Well, You Needn't", "I'm Gettin' Sentimental over You", "All the Things You Are", "Honeysuckle Rose" and "Bemsha Swing"
- Ben Riley – drums on "Well, You Needn't", "I'm Gettin' Sentimental over You", "All the Things You Are", "Honeysuckle Rose" and "Bemsha Swing"
