= Genius of Modern Music, Vol. 2 =

Compilation album by Thelonious Monk
- Released: 1952
- Recorded: October 15, 1947; October 24, 1947; November 21, 1947; July 2, 1948; July 23, 1951
- Genre: Jazz
- Label: Blue Note; BLP 5009

Thelonious Monk 10-inch LP chronology
| Milt Jackson: Wizard of the Vibes (1952) | Genius of Modern Music, Vol. 2 (1952) | Thelonious (1953) |

Thelonious Monk chronology
| Milt Jackson and the Thelonious Monk Quintet (1952) | Genius of Modern Music: Volume 2 (1952) | Piano Solo (1954) |

Genius of Modern Music, Vol. 2 is a 10" album by American jazz pianist Thelonious Monk, released on Blue Note in 1952.

== Background ==
Monk recorded six sessions for Blue Note, all produced by Alfred Lion and recorded by Doug Hawkins: October 15 and 24, 1947, November 21, 1947, July 2, 1948, July 23, 1951, and May 30, 1952. Genius of Modern Music, Vol. 2 was cut from the first five sessions.

== Reception ==
AllMusic rated the album five out of five.

== Track listing ==
=== Genius of Modern Music, Vol. 2 – BLP 5009 ===
All tracks are written by Thelonious Monk, except as noted.

Side 1
| No. | Title | Writer(s) | Date recorded | Length |
|---|---|---|---|---|
| 1. | "Four in One" | | July 23, 1951 |
| 2. | "Who Knows?" | | November 21, 1947 |
| 3. | "Nice Work If You Can Get It" | George Gershwin; Ira Gershwin | October 24, 1947 |
| 4. | "In Walked Bud" | | November 21, 1947 |

Side 2
| No. | Title | Writer(s) | Date recorded | Length |
|---|---|---|---|---|
| 1. | "Humph" | | October 15, 1947 |
| 2. | "Straight, No Chaser" | | July 23, 1951 |
| 3. | "Suburban Eyes" | Ike Quebec | October 15, 1947 |
| 4. | "Ask Me Now" | | July 23, 1951 |

== Personnel ==
=== Musicians ===
==== October 15, 1947 ====
- Thelonious Monk – piano
- Idrees Sulieman – trumpet
- Danny Quebec West – alto saxophone
- Billy Smith – tenor saxophone
- Gene Ramey – bass
- Art Blakey – drums

==== October 24, 1947 ====
- Thelonious Monk – piano
- Gene Ramey – bass
- Art Blakey – drums

==== November 21, 1947 ====
- Thelonious Monk – piano
- George Taitt – trumpet
- Sahib Shihab – alto saxophone
- Bob Paige – bass
- Art Blakey – drums

==== July 2, 1948 ====
- Milt Jackson – vibraphone
- Thelonious Monk – piano
- John Simmons – bass
- Shadow Wilson – drums

==== July 23, 1951 ====
- Thelonious Monk – piano
- Sahib Shihab – alto saxophone (except "Ask Me Now")
- Milt Jackson – vibraphone (except "Ask Me Now")
- Al McKibbon – bass
- Art Blakey – drums

=== Technical personnel ===
- Alfred Lion – producer
- Doug Hawkins – engineer
- Ira Gitler – liner notes
