= It's Monk's Time =

Studio album by Thelonious Monk
- Released: July 1964
- Recorded: January 29–March 9, 1964
- Genre: Jazz
- Length: 47:59
- Label: Columbia
- Producer: Teo Macero

Thelonious Monk chronology
Miles & Monk at Newport (1964)	It's Monk's Time (1964)	Monk (1965)

Professional ratings
Review scores
Source	Rating
AllMusic	5/5 stars
The Penguin Guide to Jazz Recordings	3.5/4 stars
The Rolling Stone Jazz Record Guide	4/5 stars

It's Monk's Time is a studio album by American jazz musician Thelonious Monk, released in July 1964 by Columbia Records. It featured three original compositions as well as three jazz standards.

== Reception ==
In a retrospective review for AllMusic, Lindsay Planer wrote that the album contains "some of the best — if not arguably the best — studio sides that the pianist cut during his final years as a recording musician," praising the "mischievous playfulness in Monk's nimble keyboard work" on the unaccompanied opening to "Lulu's Back in Town" and calling the concluding "Shuffle Boil" "one of the lost gems of the artist's later work."

David Rickert, reviewing the 2003 expanded reissue of the album for All About Jazz, called it "in many ways the least compromising of Monk's Columbia records," but found its originals among Monk's weaker compositions, writing that "no classic Monk tunes are featured here" and that "the abrasive 'Shuffle Boil' never quite gets off the ground." Jerry D'Souza, also reviewing the reissue for All About Jazz, was more enthusiastic, describing the restored solo "Memories of You" as "a moment of translucent beauty where he shapes images with gentle grace even as he injects shifts in timbre and pulse," and concluding that "Monk enthralls and his time continues to be ripe!"

== Track listing ==
Side one

1. "Lulu's Back in Town" (Al Dubin, Harry Warren) – 9:55
2. "Memories of You" (Andy Razaf, Eubie Blake) – 6:06
3. "Stuffy Turkey" (Thelonious Monk) – 8:16

Side two

1. "Brake's Sake" (Monk) – 12:29
5. "Nice Work If You Can Get It" (George Gershwin, Ira Gershwin) – 4:15
6. "Shuffle Boil" (Monk) – 7:09

Bonus tracks on 2012 reissue

7. "Epistrophy" (Kenny Clarke, Monk) - 5:04
8. "Nice Work If You Can Get It" (Alternate take) - 4:06
9. "Shuffle Boil" (Alternate take) - 4:51

Notes

- Tracks 5, 6 and 8 recorded January 29, 1964.
- Tracks 3 and 7 recorded January 30, 1964.
- Tracks 1 and 4 recorded February 10, 1964.
- Track 2 and 9 recorded March 9, 1964.

== Personnel ==
- Thelonious Monk – piano
- Butch Warren – bass
- Ben Riley – drums
- Charlie Rouse – tenor saxophone
- Teo Macero – producer
