= Underground (Thelonious Monk album) =

Studio album by Thelonious Monk
- Released: May 1968
- Recorded: December 14 and 21, 1967; February 14 and December 14, 1968
- Genre: Jazz
- Length: 37:23 (1:11:04 on Special Edition)
- Label: Columbia
- Producer: Teo Macero

Thelonious Monk chronology
Straight, No Chaser (1967)	Underground (1968)	Monk's Blues (1968)

Professional ratings
Review scores
Source	Rating
AllMusic	4.5/5 stars
DownBeat	4/5 stars
The Penguin Guide to Jazz Recordings	4/4 stars
The Rolling Stone Jazz Record Guide	4/5 stars

Underground is a studio album by American jazz pianist Thelonious Monk, released in May 1968 by Columbia Records. It is the last album to feature the Thelonious Monk Quartet, with Monk on piano, Larry Gales on bass, Charlie Rouse on tenor sax, and Ben Riley on drums. Its cover image depicts Monk as a World War II-era French Resistance fighter, an homage to longtime patroness and friend Pannonica de Koenigswarter, who had served in the resistance, and whose likeness also appears on the cover.

== Music ==
"Green Chimneys" is named after the school attended by Monk's daughter.

For "In Walked Bud", Jon Hendricks added lyrics.

== Track listing ==
All songs composed by Thelonious Monk unless otherwise noted.

=== Original LP ===
Side one

1. "Thelonious" - 3:14
2. "Ugly Beauty" - 7:20 recorded December 14, 1967
3. "Raise Four" - 4:36
4. "Boo Boo's Birthday" - 5:56

Side two

1. "Easy Street" (Alan Rankin Jones) - 5:52
2. "Green Chimneys" - 9:00 recorded December 14, 1968
3. "In Walked Bud" - 4:17

=== CD reissue ===
1. "Thelonious" – 3:13
2. "Ugly Beauty" – 3:17
3. "Raise Four" – 5:47
4. "Boo Boo's Birthday" – 5:56
5. "Easy Street" (Alan Rankin Jones) – 5:53
6. "Green Chimneys" – 9:00
7. "In Walked Bud" (Jon Hendricks, Monk) – 4:17

=== Special edition ===
1. "Thelonious" – 3:16
2. "Ugly Beauty" – 10:45
3. "Raise Four" – 7:00
4. "Boo Boo's Birthday (Take 11)" – 5:55
5. "Easy Street" – 7:50
6. "Green Chimneys" – 13:09
7. "In Walked Bud" – 6:48
8. "Ugly Beauty (Take 4)" – 7:37
9. "Boo Boo's Birthday (Take 2)" – 5:34
10. "Thelonious (Take 3)" – 3:10

== Personnel ==
Musicians

- Thelonious Monk – piano
- Charlie Rouse – tenor saxophone
- Larry Gales – bass
- Ben Riley – drums
- Jon Hendricks – vocals on "In Walked Bud"

Production

- Teo Macero – production
- Tim Geelan – engineering
- Horn Grinner Studios – photography
- John Berg, Richard Mantel – art direction
