= Solo Monk =

Studio album by Thelonious Monk
- Released: June 1965
- Recorded: October 31, 1964 – March 2, 1965
- Genre: Jazz
- Length: 38:05
- Label: Columbia
- Producer: Teo Macero

Thelonious Monk chronology
Monk (1965)	Solo Monk (1965)	Live at the It Club (1964)

Professional ratings
Review scores
Source	Rating
AllMusic	4.5/5 stars
DownBeat	3/5 stars
The Encyclopedia of Popular Music	4/5 stars
The Penguin Guide to Jazz Recordings	3/4 stars
The Rolling Stone Jazz Record Guide	3/5 stars

Solo Monk (1965) is the fifth studio album Thelonious Monk recorded for Columbia Records, and his eighth overall for that label. The album is composed of solo piano work by Monk. The AllMusic review by Thom Jurek states, "This is perhaps the solo piano record to have by Monk". In addition to various vinyl and CD issues, Sony Music Enterprises issued an SACD (SRGS 4520) in Japan.

== Track listing ==
All compositions by Thelonious Monk except as indicated

Side one

1. "Dinah" [take 2] (Akst, Lewis, Young) – 2:27
2. "I Surrender, Dear" (Barris, Clifford) – 3:43
3. "Sweet and Lovely" [take 2] (Arnheim, LeMare, Tobias) – 2:58
4. "North of the Sunset" – 1:50
5. "Ruby, My Dear" [take 3] – 5:35
6. "I'm Confessin' (That I Love You)" (Doc Daugherty, Neiburg, Ellis Reynolds) – 2:36

Side two

1. "I Hadn't Anyone Till You" (Noble) – 3:17
2. "Everything Happens to Me" [take 3] (Adair, Dennis) – 3:25
3. "Monk's Point" – 2:11
4. "I Should Care" (Cahn, Stordahl, Weston) – 1:56
5. "Ask Me Now" [take 2] – 4:35
6. "These Foolish Things (Remind Me of You)" (Link, Marvell, Strachey) – 3:32

CD bonus tracks

13. "Introspection" – 2:14
14. "Darn That Dream" (DeLange, Van Heusen) – 3:41
15. "Dinah" (Akst, Lewis, Young) – 2:25
16. "Sweet and Lovely" (Arnheim, LeMare, Tobias) – 3:18
17. "Ruby, My Dear" – 4:48
18. "I'm Confessin' (That I Love You)" (Daugherty, Neiburg, Reynolds) – 2:44
19. "I Hadn't Anyone Till You" (Noble) – 3:21
20. "Everything Happens to Me" (Adair, Dennis) – 5:20
21. "Ask Me Now" – 3:43

== Personnel ==
- Thelonious Monk – piano
