= Straight, No Chaser (Thelonious Monk album) =

Studio album by Thelonious Monk
- Released: 1967
- Recorded: 1966–1967
- Genre: Jazz
- Length: 51:24 (original LP); 75:56 (CD reissue)
- Label: Columbia
- Producer: Teo Macero

Thelonious Monk chronology
Misterioso (Recorded on Tour) (1965)	Straight, No Chaser (1967)	Underground (1968)

Professional ratings
Review scores
Source	Rating
AllMusic	4/5 stars
DownBeat	3.5/5 stars
The Encyclopedia of Popular Music	4/5 stars
The Penguin Guide to Jazz Recordings	3/4 stars
The Rolling Stone Jazz Record Guide	3/5 stars

Straight, No Chaser is the sixth studio album Thelonious Monk recorded for Columbia Records, released in 1967. The album was reissued on CD in 1996, including restored versions of previously abridged performances and three additional tracks.

== Track listing ==
All songs are written by Thelonious Monk except where noted.

Side one

1. "Locomotive" – 6:38
2. "I Didn't Know About You" (Duke Ellington, Bob Russell) – 6:50
3. "Straight, No Chaser" – 10:31

Side two

1. "Japanese Folk Song" (Rentarō Taki) (Note: On the original LP, the song "Kōjō no Tsuki" by Rentarō Taki was incorrectly identified as a "Japanese folk song" of unknown provenance. This was corrected on reissues of the album.) – 11:03
2. "Between the Devil and the Deep Blue Sea" (Harold Arlen, Ted Koehler) – 7:34
3. "We See" – 8:48

CD reissue

1. "Locomotive" – 6:40
2. "I Didn't Know About You" (Ellington) – 6:52
3. "Straight, No Chaser" – 11:28
4. "Japanese Folk Song (Kōjō no Tsuki)" (Taki) – 16:42
5. "Between the Devil and the Deep Blue Sea" (Arlen, Koehler) – 7:36
6. "We See" – 11:37
7. "This Is My Story, This Is My Song" (Phoebe Knapp) – 1:42 (better known by the title "Blessed Assurance")
8. "I Didn't Know About You" (Ellington) – 6:49
9. "Green Chimneys" – 6:34

== Personnel ==
- Thelonious Monk – piano
- Charlie Rouse – tenor saxophone
- Larry Gales – double bass
- Ben Riley – drums
