= Milt Jackson and the Thelonious Monk Quintet =

1952 album

Compilation album by Milt Jackson
- Released: 1956
- Recorded: July 2, 1948; July 23, 1951; April 7, 1952
- Genre: Jazz
- Label: Blue Note; BLP 1509
- Producer: Alfred Lion

Milt Jackson chronology
| Milt Jackson Quartet (1955) | Milt Jackson and the Thelonious Monk Quintet (1956) | Opus de Jazz (1956) |

Wizard of the Vibes

Studio album by Milt Jackson
- Released: 1952
- Recorded: July 23, 1951; April 7, 1952
- Genre: Jazz
- Label: Blue Note; BLP 5011
- Producer: Alfred Lion

Thelonious Monk 10-inch LP chronology
| Genius of Modern Music: Volume 1 (1951) | Wizard of the Vibes (1952) | Genius of Modern Music: Volume 2 (1952) |

Milt Jackson and the Thelonious Monk Quintet is an album by American jazz vibraphonist Milt Jackson, recorded on July 2, 1948, July 23, 1951, and April 7, 1952, and released on Blue Note in 1956. The latter two sessions were originally released on ten-inch LP as Wizard of the Vibes (1952).

== Background ==
=== Recording ===
The sessions were the work of The Thelonious Monk Quintet (the July 2, 1948, and July 23, 1951, sessions) and the Modern Jazz Quartet plus Lou Donaldson (a 1952 session). The album has been recompiled and expanded three additional times, with various tracks from these sessions added and deleted.

The tracks from the Modern Jazz Quartet plus Lou Donaldson consisted of John Lewis on piano, Percy Heath on bass, Kenny Clarke on drums, Milt Jackson on vibraphone, and Lou Donaldson on alto saxophone. The tracks with the Thelonious Monk Quintet were Thelonious Monk on piano, John Simmons on bass, Shadow Wilson on drums, and Milt Jackson on vibraphone—with Kenny "Pancho" Hagood singing on the tracks "All the Things You Are" and "I Should Care".

=== Release history ===
The original 1952 10" LP was expanded to a 12" LP in 1956, and retitled Milt Jackson and the Thelonious Monk Quintet with a cover designed by Reid Miles, his first for the label. In 1989, the cover and title of the 1956 version were used for a CD featuring the complete 1948 and 1952 sessions, but the 1951 Monk Session was moved to Monk's Genius of Modern Music: Volume 2. The 2001 album Milt Jackson: Wizard of the Vibes used the cover art and title of the original 1952 album, but contained a re-ordered and remastered version of the contents of the 1989 CD.

In each formulation, the album contained Blue Note Thelonious Monk-led performances unavailable on the parallel editions of Genius of Modern Music.

== Reception ==
Professional ratings
Review scores
| Source | Rating |
|---|---|
| AllMusic | 4.5/5 stars |
| The Penguin Guide to Jazz | 4/4 stars |

The Penguin Guide to Jazz described the tracks with Monk as "classics, rising to their greatest height with the riveting version of 'I Mean You'."

The AllMusic reviewer wrote that "Jackson's inventive playing throughout both dates makes this an important CD in his considerable discography, so it should be a part of any bop fan's collection."

== Track listings ==
=== Original release (Blue Note BLP 1509, 12", 1956) ===
Side 1
| No. | Title | Music | Date recorded | Length |
|---|---|---|---|---|
| 1. | "Lillie" | | April 7, 1952 |
| 2. | "Tahiti" | | April 7, 1952 |
| 3. | "What's New?" | | April 7, 1952 |
| 4. | "Bags' Groove" | | April 7, 1952 |
| 5. | "On the Scene" | Lou Donaldson | April 7, 1952 |
| 6. | "Willow Weep for Me" | Ann Ronnell | July 23, 1951 |

Side 2
| No. | Title | Date recorded | Length |
|---|---|---|---|
| 1. | "Criss-Cross" | July 23, 1951 |
| 2. | "Eronel" | July 23, 1951 |
| 3. | "Misterioso" (alternate master) | July 2, 1948 |
| 4. | "Evidence" | July 2, 1948 |
| 5. | "Lillie" (alternate master) | April 7, 1952 |
| 6. | "Four in One" (alternate master) | July 23, 1951 |

=== CD reissues ===
All music is composed by Milt Jackson, except as noted.

1989 reissue
| No. | Title | Lyrics | Music | Date recorded | Length |
|---|---|---|---|---|---|
| 1. | "Tahiti" | | | April 7, 1952 | 3:26 |
| 2. | "Lillie" | | | April 7, 1952 | 3:13 |
| 3. | "Lillie" (alternate take) | | | April 7, 1952 | 3:15 |
| 4. | "Bags' Groove" | | | April 7, 1952 | 3:03 |
| 5. | "What's New?" | Johnny Burke | Bob Haggart | April 7, 1952 | 3:08 |
| 6. | "What's New?" (alternate take) | Burke | Haggart | April 7, 1952 | 3:10 |
| 7. | "Don't Get Around Much Anymore" | | Duke Ellington | April 7, 1952 | 2:58 |
| 8. | "Don't Get Around Much Anymore" (alternate take) | | Ellington | April 7, 1952 | 2:56 |
| 9. | "On the Scene" | | Lou Donaldson | April 7, 1952 | 2:40 |
| 10. | "Evidence" | | Thelonious Monk | July 2, 1948 | 2:31 |
| 11. | "Misterioso" | | Monk | July 2, 1948 | 3:11 |
| 12. | "Misterioso" (alternate take) | | Monk | July 2, 1948 | 2:43 |
| 13. | "Epistrophy" | | Kenny Clarke; Monk | July 2, 1948 | 3:05 |
| 14. | "I Mean You" | | Monk | July 2, 1948 | 2:44 |
| 15. | "All the Things You Are" | Roger Hammerstein II | Jerome Kern | July 2, 1948 | 2:57 |
| 16. | "I Should Care" (alternate take) | Sammy Cahn | Axel Stordahl; Paul Weston | July 2, 1948 | 3:00 |
| 17. | "I Should Care" | Cahn | Stordahl; Weston | July 2, 1948 | 2:59 |

- The 2001 RVG edition restores the ten-inch cover and title, and appends the alternate takes to their respective sessions.

=== Milt Jackson: Wizard of the Vibes (Blue Note LP 5011, 10", 1952) ===
All music is composed by Milt Jackson, except as noted.

Side 1
| No. | Title | Music | Date recorded | Length |
|---|---|---|---|---|
| 1. | "Tahiti" | | April 7, 1952 |
| 2. | "Lillie" | | April 7, 1952 |
| 3. | "Criss-Cross" | Thelonious Monk | July 23, 1951 |
| 4. | "Willow Weep for Me" | Ann Ronnell | July 23, 1951 |

Side 2
| No. | Title | Lyrics | Music | Date recorded | Length |
|---|---|---|---|---|---|
| 1. | "What's New?" | Johnny Burke | Bob Haggart | April 7, 1952 |
| 2. | "Bags' Groove" | | | April 7, 1952 |
| 3. | "On the Scene" | | Lou Donaldson | April 7, 1952 |
| 4. | "Eronel" | | Monk; Idrees Sulieman; Sadik Hakim | July 23, 1951 |

== Personnel ==
=== Musicians ===
==== July 2, 1948 ====
- Milt Jackson – vibraphone
- Thelonious Monk – piano
- John Simmons – bass
- Shadow Wilson – drummer
- Kenny Hagood – vocals ("All the Things You Are", "I Should Care")

==== July 23, 1951 ====
- Thelonious Monk – piano
- Sahib Shihab – alto saxophone
- Milt Jackson – vibraphone
- Al McKibbon – bass
- Art Blakey – drums

==== April 7, 1952 ====
- Milt Jackson – vibraphone
- Lou Donaldson – alto saxophone (except "Lillie", "What's New?")
- John Lewis – piano
- Percy Heath – bass
- Kenny Clarke – drummer

=== Technical personnel ===
==== Original ====
- Alfred Lion – producer
- Harry Smith (1948), Doug Hawkins (1952) – recording engineer
- Rudy Van Gelder (1956) – remastering
- Reid Miles – design
- Francis Wolff – photography
- Leonard Feather – liner notes

==== Reissue ====
- Michael Cuscuna – producer
- Ron McMaster – digital transfers
