= Live at the It Club =

Live album by Thelonious Monk
- Released: 1982, 1998
- Recorded: October 31 and November 1, 1964
- Genre: Jazz
- Length: 77:45
- Label: Columbia
- Producer: Teo Macero

Thelonious Monk chronology
Solo Monk (1964)	Live at the It Club (1982)	Live at the Jazz Workshop (1964)

Professional ratings
Review scores
Source	Rating
AllMusic	4/5 stars
The Penguin Guide to Jazz Recordings	4/4 stars
The Rolling Stone Jazz Record Guide	5/5 stars

Live at the It Club is a live album by Thelonious Monk, released posthumously by Columbia Records. It was recorded on October 31 and November 1, 1964, at the "It" Club in Los Angeles, California. The album features Monk's quartet—with Charlie Rouse on tenor saxophone, Larry Gales on bass, and Ben Riley on drums—performing original compositions as well as jazz standards.

The album was first issued in 1982 as a double-LP entitled Live At The "It" Club. In 1998, Columbia/Legacy Records reissued the album as a double-CD set entitled Live At The It Club--Complete that includes virtually all of the band's performances from the two evenings.

== History ==
In 1964, Monk assembled, and began touring and recording with, what would come to be regarded as his "most venerable" quartet. On October 31 and November 2 Monk recorded sessions for the album Solo Monk. The band performed on October 31 and November 1 at the It Club, and then again on November 3 and 4 at San Francisco's Jazz Workshop, performances that were later released as Live at the Jazz Workshop. Critic Bob Blumenthal called Live at the It Club "an incredible cache of vintage Monk" that serves as "a prime document of what [Monk's] band sounded like" during this productive period.

== Track listing ==
The quartet played three short sets on each of their two nights at the It Club. Tracks were omitted or edited for the 1982 release. The 1998 "complete" reissue includes the music as it was played, with a few exceptions. A take of "Sweet and Lovely" was omitted due to issues with recording quality, and "Straight, No Chaser", originally performed after "Bemsha Swing," was placed on the second disc.

=== 1982 Original LP ===
Side one
No.	Title	Length
1.	"Blue Monk"	7:30
2.	"Well, You Needn't"	7:35
3.	"'Round Midnight"	6:35

Side two
No.	Title	Length
4.	"Rhythm-A-Ning"	6:55
5.	"Blues Five Spot"	5:50
6.	"Bemsha Swing"	5:30

Side three
No.	Title	Length
7.	"Straight, No Chaser"	4:30
8.	"Nutty"	7:35
9.	"Evidence"	5:45

Side four
No.	Title	Length
10.	"Misterioso"	8:20
11.	"Gallop's Gallop"	5:15
12.	"Ba-Lue Bolivar Ba-Lues-Are"	6:25

=== 1998 CD reissue ===
Disc one
No.	Title	Length
1.	"Blue Monk"	11:19
2.	"Well, You Needn't"	9:17
3.	"'Round Midnight"	6:32
4.	"Rhythm-A-Ning"	10:09
5.	"Blues Five Spot"	10:13
6.	"Bemsha Swing"	8:34
7.	"Evidence"	8:37
8.	"Nutty"	10:48
9.	"Epistrophy (Theme)"	1:00

Disc two
No.	Title	Length
10.	"Straight, No Chaser"	7:15
11.	"Teo"	10:54
12.	"I'm Getting Sentimental over You"	12:28
13.	"Misterioso"	8:22
14.	"Gallop’s Gallop"	5:17
15.	"Ba-lue Bolivar Ba-lues-are"	9:01
16.	"Bright Mississippi"	9:47
17.	"Just You, Just Me"	6:14
18.	"All The Things You Are"	6:40
19.	"Epistrophy (Theme)"	1:09

== Personnel ==
- Thelonious Monk – piano
- Charlie Rouse – tenor sax
- Larry Gales – bass
- Ben Riley – drums
