= Live at the Jazz Workshop =

Live album by Thelonious Monk
- Released: 1982
- Recorded: November 3 & 4, 1964
- Venue: Jazz Workshop, San Francisco
- Genre: Jazz
- Label: Columbia
- Producer: Teo Macero

Thelonious Monk chronology
Live at the It Club (1964)	Live at the Jazz Workshop (1982)	Misterioso (Recorded on Tour) (1965)

Alternative cover
- Cover of the 2001 CD reissue

Professional ratings
Review scores
Source	Rating
AllMusic	4.5/5 stars
The Encyclopedia of Popular Music	4/5 stars
The Penguin Guide to Jazz Recordings	3/4 stars
The Rolling Stone Jazz Record Guide	3/5 stars

Live at the Jazz Workshop is a live album by jazz pianist Thelonious Monk, recorded at the Jazz Workshop in San Francisco. It was recorded on November 3 and 4, 1964, and released by Columbia Records in 1982.

== Release history ==
The tapes of these two shows stayed locked away in the Columbia Records vault for almost 20 years, until the label released a double-LP from them shortly after Monk's death in 1982. A CD release followed in 2001, under the name of Live at the Jazz Workshop - Complete, featuring a number of bonus tracks, and nearly doubling the length of the record.

== Track listing ==
1982 release

Side 1

1. "Don't Blame Me/Ba-lue Bolivar Ba-lues-are"
2. "Well, You Needn't"
3. "Evidence (Justice)/Rhythm-A-Ning"
4. "'Round About Midnight"
5. "I'm Getting Sentimental Over You"

Side 2

1. "Bemsha Swing"
2. "Memories of You/Just You, Just Me"
3. "Blue Monk"
4. "Misterioso"
5. "Hackensack"
6. "Bright Mississippi"
7. "Epistrophy"

Live at the Jazz Workshop: Complete (2001)

CD 1 [November 3, 1964]

1. "Don't Blame Me" – 1:43
2. "Ba-lue Bolivar Ba-lues-are" – 7:32
3. "Well, You Needn't" – 10:30
4. "Evidence/Rhythm-A-Ning" – 6:24
5. "Epistrophy" (theme) – 1:05
6. "Hackensack" – 8:03
7. "Bright Mississippi" – 2:50
8. "Evidence" – 4:36
9. "Epistrophy" – 3:53
10. "Round Midnight" 6:06
11. "I'm Getting Sentimental Over You" – 6:41
12. "Memories of You" – 2:28
13. "Just You, Just Me" – 6:44
14. "Epistrophy" – 5:28

CD 2 [November 4, 1964]

1. "Blue Monk" – 7:06
2. "Well, You Needn't" – 8:08
3. "Bright Mississippi" – 8:11
4. "Bemsha Swing" – 4:09
5. "Round Midnight" – 6:27
6. "Nutty" – 8:08
7. "Straight, No Chaser" – 6:29
8. "Thelonious" – 3:57
9. "Hackensack" – 5:35
10. "Misterioso" – 6:52
11. "Ba-lue Bolivar Ba-lues-are" – 7:47
12. "Epistrophy" (theme) – 1:02

== Personnel ==
- Thelonious Monk – piano
- Charlie Rouse – tenor saxophone
- Larry Gales – bass
- Ben Riley – drums
