= Monk's Dream (Thelonious Monk album) =

Studio album by Thelonious Monk
- Released: January 1963
- Recorded: October 31, November 1, 2 & 6, 1962
- Studios: Columbia 30th Street Studio, New York City
- Genre: Jazz
- Length: 47:02
- Label: Columbia
- Producer: Teo Macero

Thelonious Monk chronology
Thelonious Monk with John Coltrane (1961)	Monk's Dream (1963)	Thelonious Monk in Italy (1963)

Monk's Dream is an album by jazz pianist Thelonious Monk, released by Columbia Records in January 1963. It was Monk's first album for Columbia following his five-year recording period with Riverside Records.

== Recording and music ==
"Bye-Ya" and "Bolivar Blues" were recorded on October 31, 1962; "Body and Soul" and "Bright Mississippi" on November 1; "Sweet and Lovely", "Just a Gigolo" and "Monk's Dream" on November 2; and "Five Spot Blues" on November 6.

"Bright Mississippi" is the only composition on the album that Monk had not previously recorded. "Bolivar Blues" was originally titled "Ba-lue Bolivar Ba-lues-are" and had been on Monk's 1957 Riverside album, Brilliant Corners. "Five Spot Blues" was called "Blues Five Spot" and first appeared on the album Misterioso, which was recorded in concert at the Five Spot Cafe in New York in 1958 and released by Riverside. "Monk's Dream", "Bye-Ya", and "Sweet and Lovely" were recorded for Prestige at a session ten years earlier.

== Critical reception ==
Professional ratings
Review scores
Source	Rating
AllMusic	5/5 stars
DownBeat	5/5 stars
The Penguin Guide to Jazz Recordings	3/4 stars
The Rolling Stone Jazz Record Guide	4/5 stars

In DownBeat, jazz critic Pete Welding gave the album five stars and called it "a stunning reaffirmation of his powers as a performer and composer."

== Track listing ==
All tracks are written by Thelonious Monk except where noted.

Side one
No.	Title	Writer(s)	Length
1.	"Monk's Dream"		6:26
2.	"Body and Soul"	Edward Heyman, Robert Sour, Frank Eyton, Johnny Green	4:29
3.	"Bright Mississippi"		8:34
4.	"Five Spot Blues"		3:15

Side two
No.	Title	Writer(s)	Length
1.	"Bolivar Blues"		7:30
2.	"Just a Gigolo"	Julius Brammer, Irving Caesar, Leonello Casucci	2:29
3.	"Bye-Ya"		6:01
4.	"Sweet and Lovely"	Gus Arnheim, Harry Tobias, Jules LeMare	7:48

Bonus tracks on 2002 reissue
No.	Title	Length
1.	"Monk's Dream" (Take 3)	5:14
2.	"Body and Soul" (Take 1)	5:05
3.	"Bright Mississippi" (Take 3)	10:20
4.	"Bolivar Blues" (Take 1)	6:20

== Personnel ==
- Thelonious Monk – piano
- Charlie Rouse – tenor saxophone
- John Ore – bass
- Frankie Dunlop – drums
