= Monk (1964 album) =

Monk.

Studio album by Thelonious Monk
- Released: January 1965
- Recorded: March 9, October 6–8, 1964
- Genre: Jazz
- Length: 45:34
- Label: Columbia
- Producer: Teo Macero

Thelonious Monk chronology
| It's Monk's Time (1964) | Monk. (1965) | Solo Monk (1965) |

Professional ratings
Review scores
| Source | Rating |
|---|---|
| AllMusic | (favorable) |
| DownBeat | 3.5/5 stars |
| The Penguin Guide to Jazz Recordings | 3/4 stars |
| The Rolling Stone Jazz Record Guide | 3/5 stars |

Monk. is a studio album by American jazz musician Thelonious Monk, released in January 1965 by Columbia Records. It features two original compositions and several jazz standards.

The track "Pannonica" is a tribute to the jazz patron Pannonica de Koenigswarter. The track "Teo" is a tribute to the album's producer Teo Macero.

The album cover is a photo of Monk taken by W. Eugene Smith in 1959. Between 1957 and 1965, Monk and other prominent New York jazz musicians rehearsed at the photographer's home, nicknamed 'The Jazz Loft'.

== Track listing ==
Side one

1. "Liza (All the Clouds'll Roll Away)" (Gershwin, Kahn, Gershwin) - (4:35)
2. "April in Paris" (Harburg, Duke) - (7:52)
3. "Children's Song (That Old Man)" (public domain) - (4:55)
4. "I Love You (Sweetheart of All My Dreams)" (Art Fitch, Bert Lowe, Kay Fitch) - (6:45)

Side two

1. "Just You, Just Me" (Greer, Klages) - (8:42)
2. "Pannonica" (Monk) - (7:21)
3. "Teo" (Monk) - (5:24)
- "I Love You (Sweetheart of All My Dreams)" was misidentified as the Irving Berlin song "(Just One Way to Say) I Love You" through its 1980s releases. It is identified correctly on its 2018 rerelease.

== Personnel ==
- Piano - Thelonious Monk
- Bass - Larry Gales
- Drums - Ben Riley
- Producer - Teo Macero
- Tenor saxophone - Charlie Rouse
- Liner notes - Bill Evans
