= 5 by Monk by 5 =

1959 studio album by jazz pianist Thelonious Monk

Studio album by Thelonious Monk
- Released: 1959
- Recorded: June 1, 2 & 4, 1959
- Genre: Jazz
- Length: 44:08
- Label: Riverside
- Producer: Orrin Keepnews

Thelonious Monk chronology
The Thelonious Monk Orchestra at Town Hall (1959)	5 by Monk by 5 (1959)	Thelonious Alone in San Francisco (1959)

Professional ratings
Review scores
Source	Rating
AllMusic	4/5 stars
The Penguin Guide to Jazz	3/4 stars
The Rolling Stone Jazz Record Guide	4/5 stars

5 by Monk by 5 is an album by American jazz pianist Thelonious Monk, recorded in June 1959 and released on Riverside later that year. Monk's "five" features brass section Thad Jones and Charlie Rouse, with rhythm section Sam Jones and Art Taylor.

== Background ==
=== Recording and composition ===
The title of the album comes from the quintet playing five of Monk's compositions. These included the new "Jackie-Ing", which Monk hummed to the others to help them learn it. The album also featured the debut of "Played Twice".

=== Release history ===
The CD reissue by Original Jazz Classics added two previously rejected takes of "Played Twice".

== Reception ==
The Penguin Guide to Jazz described it as "A relatively little-known Monk session, but a very good one."

The AllMusic reviewer contrasted the complexity of the compositions with the contributions of Monk as a band member.

== Track listing ==
All songs by Thelonious Monk unless otherwise noted.

Side one

1. Jackie-Ing – 6:06
2. Straight, No Chaser – 9:21
3. Played Twice – 7:59

Side two

1. "I Mean You" (Monk, Coleman Hawkins) – 9:47
2. "Ask Me Now" – 10:46

== Personnel ==
- Thelonious Monk – piano
- Thad Jones – cornet
- Charlie Rouse – tenor saxophone
- Sam Jones – bass
- Art Taylor – drums
