= What Can I Say After I Say I'm Sorry? =

Popular song first published in 1926

- by Walter Donaldson
- Text: by Abe Lyman
- Published: 1926

"What Can I Say After I Say I'm Sorry?" is a popular song by Walter Donaldson and Abe Lyman, published in 1926.

The song has become a popular and jazz standard recorded by many artists.

== Notable recordings ==
- Josephine Baker (1926)
- Will Bradley & His Orchestra (vocal by Ray McKinley). This charted briefly in the Billboard chart at No. 26.
- California Ramblers (1926)
- The King Cole Trio – included in the album The King Cole Trio (vol. 2) (1946)
- Bobby Darin – for his album Winners (1964)
- Buddy DeFranco – Sweet and Lovely (1956).
- Tommy Dorsey – recorded on February 1, 1940, for Victor.
- Ruth Etting (1926)
- Ella Fitzgerald – recorded for Decca on October 12, 1939.
- Jean Goldkette & His Orchestra – recorded on January 28, 1926, for Victor.
- Benny Goodman – B.G. in Hi-Fi (1954).
- Bobby Hackett & His Orchestra – recorded on January 25, 1940, for Okeh .
- Jack Jenney & His Orchestra – recorded on January 30, 1940, for Vocalion.
- Sam Lanin – recorded on January 15, 1926, for Banner.
- Peggy Lee – for the album Songs from Pete Kelly's Blues (1955)
- Dean Martin – included in his album The Dean Martin TV Show (1966)
- Carmen McRae – Fine and Mellow: Live at Birdland West (1986)
- Oscar Peterson – With Respect to Nat (1966)
- Keely Smith – Swingin' Pretty (1959)
- Jo Stafford – Jo + Jazz (1960)
