= Fine and Mellow: Live at Birdland West =

Live album by Carmen McRae
- Released: 1988
- Recorded: December 1987
- Venue: Birdland West, Long Beach, California
- Genre: Vocal jazz
- Length: 56:27
- Label: Concord
- Producer: Carl Jefferson

Carmen McRae chronology
The Carmen McRae – Betty Carter Duets (1987)	Fine and Mellow: Live at Birdland West (1988)	Carmen Sings Monk (1988)

Fine and Mellow: Live at Birdland West is a 1988 live album by Carmen McRae.

McRae was nominated for the Grammy Award for Best Jazz Vocal Performance, Female at the 31st Annual Grammy Awards for her performance on this album.

== Reception ==
Professional ratings
Review scores
Source	Rating
AllMusic	4/5 stars
The Penguin Guide to Jazz Recordings	2.5/4 stars

The AllMusic review by Scott Yanow says that "Although Carmen McRae is the obvious star of her live record...she gives plenty of solo space to her notable all-star band". Yanow wrote of the songs that "McRae updates them a bit and makes them sound relevant and swinging. Recommended".

== Track listing ==
1. "What Is This Thing Called Love?" (Cole Porter) – 6:46
2. "What Can I Say After I Say I'm Sorry?" (Walter Donaldson, Abe Lyman) – 5:07
3. "Fine and Mellow" (Billie Holiday) – 9:31
4. "These Foolish Things (Remind Me of You)" (Jack Strachey, Harry Link, Holt Marvell) – 5:20
5. "Black and Blue" (Harry Brooks, Andy Razaf, Fats Waller) – 7:37
6. "One More Chance" (Carolyn A. Gillman) – 4:06
7. "Until the Real Thing Comes Along" (Mann Holiner, Alberta Nichols, Sammy Cahn, Saul Chaplin, L.E. Freeman) – 5:00
8. "My Handy Man Ain't Handy No More" (Eubie Blake, Razaf) – 6:44

== Personnel ==
- Carmen McRae - vocals
- Red Holloway - alto saxophone, tenor saxophone
- Jack McDuff - electric organ
- Phil Upchurch - guitar
- John Clayton - double bass
- Paul Humphrey - drums
