= Thelonious Monk in Italy =

Live album by Thelonious Monk
- Released: 1963
- Recorded: April 21, 1961
- Venue: Teatro Lirico; Milan, Italy
- Genre: Jazz
- Length: 44:45
- Label: Riverside
- Producer: Orrin Keepnews

Thelonious Monk chronology
Monk's Dream (1963)	Thelonious Monk in Italy (1963)	Criss-Cross (1963)

Thelonious Monk in Italy is a live album by American jazz pianist Thelonious Monk featuring tracks recorded in Italy in 1961 and released on the Riverside label in 1963.

== Reception ==
Professional ratings
Review scores
Source	Rating
AllMusic	3/5 stars
The Penguin Guide to Jazz Recordings	2.5/4 stars

AllMusic stated, "This is not one of Thelonious Monk's more significant dates, but his fans will still find moments to enjoy".

== Track listing ==
All compositions by Thelonious Monk except as indicated

Side one

1. "Jackie-Ing" - 4:53
2. "Epistrophy" (Kenny Clarke, Monk) - 4:59
3. "Body and Soul" (Frank Eyton, Johnny Green, Edward Heyman, Robert Sour) - 4:48
4. "Straight, No Chaser" - 9:06

Side two

1. "Bemsha Swing" (Denzil Best, Monk) - 7:14
2. "San Francisco Holiday" - 6:04
3. "Crepuscule with Nellie" - 2:50
4. "Rhythm-A-Ning" - 5:45

== Personnel ==
- Thelonious Monk - piano
- Charlie Rouse - tenor saxophone
- John Ore - bass
- Frankie Dunlop - drums
