= Monk's Blues =

Studio album by Thelonious Monk
- Released: 1968
- Recorded: November 19 and 20, 1968
- Genre: Jazz
- Length: 56:27
- Producer: Teo Macero

Thelonious Monk chronology
Underground (1967)	Monk's Blues (1968)	The London Collection (1971)

Professional ratings
Review scores
Source	Rating
AllMusic	2/5 stars
DownBeat	3/5 stars
The Penguin Guide to Jazz Recordings	3/4 stars
The Rolling Stone Jazz Record Guide	1/5 stars

Monk's Blues is an album by Thelonious Monk accompanied by a big band arranged and conducted by Oliver Nelson. Originally released by Columbia Records in 1968, it was re-released on CD in 1994. Produced by Teo Macero, the album was recorded in Los Angeles by Monk's working quartet augmented by a group of Hollywood studio musicians.

== Track listing ==
Side one

1. "Let's Cool One" – 3:47
2. "Reflections" – 4:35
3. "Rootie Tootie" – 7:35
4. "Just a Glance at Love" (Teo Macero) – 2:52
5. "Brilliant Corners" – 3:52

Side two

1. "Consecutive Seconds" (Macero) – 2:41
2. "Monk's Point" – 8:03
3. "Trinkle, Tinkle" – 4:59
4. "Straight, No Chaser" – 7:20

CD bonus tracks

1. "Blue Monk" – 6:14
2. "'Round Midnight" – 4:13

All compositions by Thelonious Monk, except where noted. Arranged by Oliver Nelson.

== Personnel ==
The Quartet

- Thelonious Sphere Monk - piano
- Charlie Rouse - tenor saxophone
- Larry Gales - bass
- Ben Riley - drums

Additional musicians

- Oliver Nelson – conductor
- Buddy Collette, Tom Scott, Gene Cipriano & Ernie Small - saxophone
- Bobby Bryant, Conte Candoli & Freddie Hill - trumpet
- Lou Blackburn, Bob Bralinger, Billy Byers & Mike Wimberly - trombone
- Howard Roberts - guitar
- John Guerin - drums
