= Brilliant Corners =

Studio album by Thelonious Monk
- Released: April 4, 1957
- Recorded: October 9, October 15, and December 7, 1956
- Genre: Hard bop
- Length: 42:47
- Label: Riverside
- Producer: Orrin Keepnews

Thelonious Monk chronology
The Unique Thelonious Monk (1956)	Brilliant Corners (1957)	Thelonious Himself (1957)

Brilliant Corners is a 1957 studio album by the American jazz pianist Thelonious Monk. It was his third album for Riverside Records, and his first on the label to include his own compositions.

== Recording ==
Brilliant Corners was recorded across three sessions in October and December 1956 with two different quintets. "Ba-lue Bolivar Ba-lues-Are" and "Pannonica", the latter featuring Monk playing celesta, were recorded on October 9 with saxophonists Ernie Henry and Sonny Rollins, bassist Oscar Pettiford, and drummer Max Roach. The former composition was titled as a phonetic rendering of Monk's exaggerated pronunciation of "Blue Bolivar Blues"; this referred to the Bolivar Hotel in Manhattan, where heiress and jazz patron Pannonica de Koenigswarter resided.

On October 15, Monk attempted to record the title track with the same band during a four-hour session. The complexity of the composition became a challenge for the band, who attempted twenty-five takes, and Henry and Pettiford became upset with Monk. Monk tried to make the recording easier for Henry by not playing during his solo. During one of the takes, producer Orrin Keepnews and others in the control room could not hear Pettiford's playing; they checked the microphone on his bass to see if it was broken, but ultimately realized that he was pantomiming. As no single take was completed, Keepnews edited the album version together from multiple takes.

"Bemsha Swing" was recorded on December 7, with Paul Chambers replacing Pettiford on bass and trumpeter Clark Terry replacing Henry; Monk recorded a solo piano version of "I Surrender Dear" on the same day.

== Composition ==
The title track has an unconventional structure that deviates from both standard song form and blues structures. Its ternary form employs an eight-bar A section followed by a seven-bar B section and a modified seven-bar A section, and features a double-time theme in each second chorus and complex rhythmic accents.

"Bemsha Swing" was the only composition on the album that Monk had previously recorded.

== Reception ==
Professional ratings
Review scores
Source	Rating
Disc	5/5 stars
The Encyclopedia of Popular Music	4/5 stars
Jazzwise	5/5 stars
The Penguin Guide to Jazz Recordings	4/4 stars

According to DownBeat, Brilliant Corners was the most critically acclaimed jazz album of 1957. Nat Hentoff, the magazine's editor, gave it five stars in a contemporary review and called it "Riverside's most important modern jazz LP to date." Jazz writer David H. Rosenthal later called it a "classic" hard bop session. Music critic Robert Christgau said that, along with his 1958 live album Misterioso, Brilliant Corners represented Monk's artistic peak.

In his five-star retrospective review of the album, AllMusic's Lindsay Planer wrote that it "may well be considered the alpha and omega of post-World War II American jazz. No serious jazz collection should be without it." The Penguin Guide to Jazz included the album in its “core collection” of essential recordings.

== Legacy ==
In 2003, Brilliant Corners was one of fifty recordings chosen that year by the Library of Congress to be added to the National Recording Registry. It has also been included in the reference book 1001 Albums You Must Hear Before You Die, with reviewer Andrew Gilbert saying that it "marked Monk's return as composer of the first order." The album was inducted into the Grammy Hall of Fame in 1999.

== Track listing ==
All tracks written by Thelonious Monk, except where noted.
1957 LP Mono Release (US, RLP 12-226)
1985 CD Mono Remastered Release (Japan, VDJ-1526). Track numbers in brackets.

Side One

1. (1) "Brilliant Corners" – 7:42
2. (2) "Ba-Lue Bolivar Ba-Lues-Are" – 13:24

Side Two

1. (3) "Pannonica" – 8:50
2. (4) "I Surrender, Dear" (Harry Barris, Gordon Clifford) – 5:25
3. (5) "Bemsha Swing" (Monk, Denzil Best) – 7:42

== Personnel ==
Musicians

- Thelonious Monk – piano (all tracks), celesta (3)
- Sonny Rollins – tenor saxophone (all but 4)
- Ernie Henry – alto saxophone (1–3)
- Clark Terry – trumpet (5)
- Oscar Pettiford – double bass (1–3)
- Paul Chambers – double bass (5)
- Max Roach – drums (all but 4), timpani (5)

Production

- Orrin Keepnews – producer
- Jack Higgins – engineering
- Joe Tarantino – mastering

== Bibliography ==
- Mathieson, Kenny (2012). Giant Steps: Bebop And The Creators Of Modern Jazz, 1945–65. Canongate Books. ISBN 978-0857866172.
- Rosenthal, David H. (1993). Hard Bop: Jazz and Black Music, 1955–1965. Oxford University Press. ISBN 0195358996.
- van der Bliek, Rob, ed. (2001). "Brilliant Corners and Riverside". The Thelonious Monk Reader. Oxford University Press. p. 84. ISBN 0199761477.
