= Club Fugazi =

Historic theater/nightclub in San Francisco, California

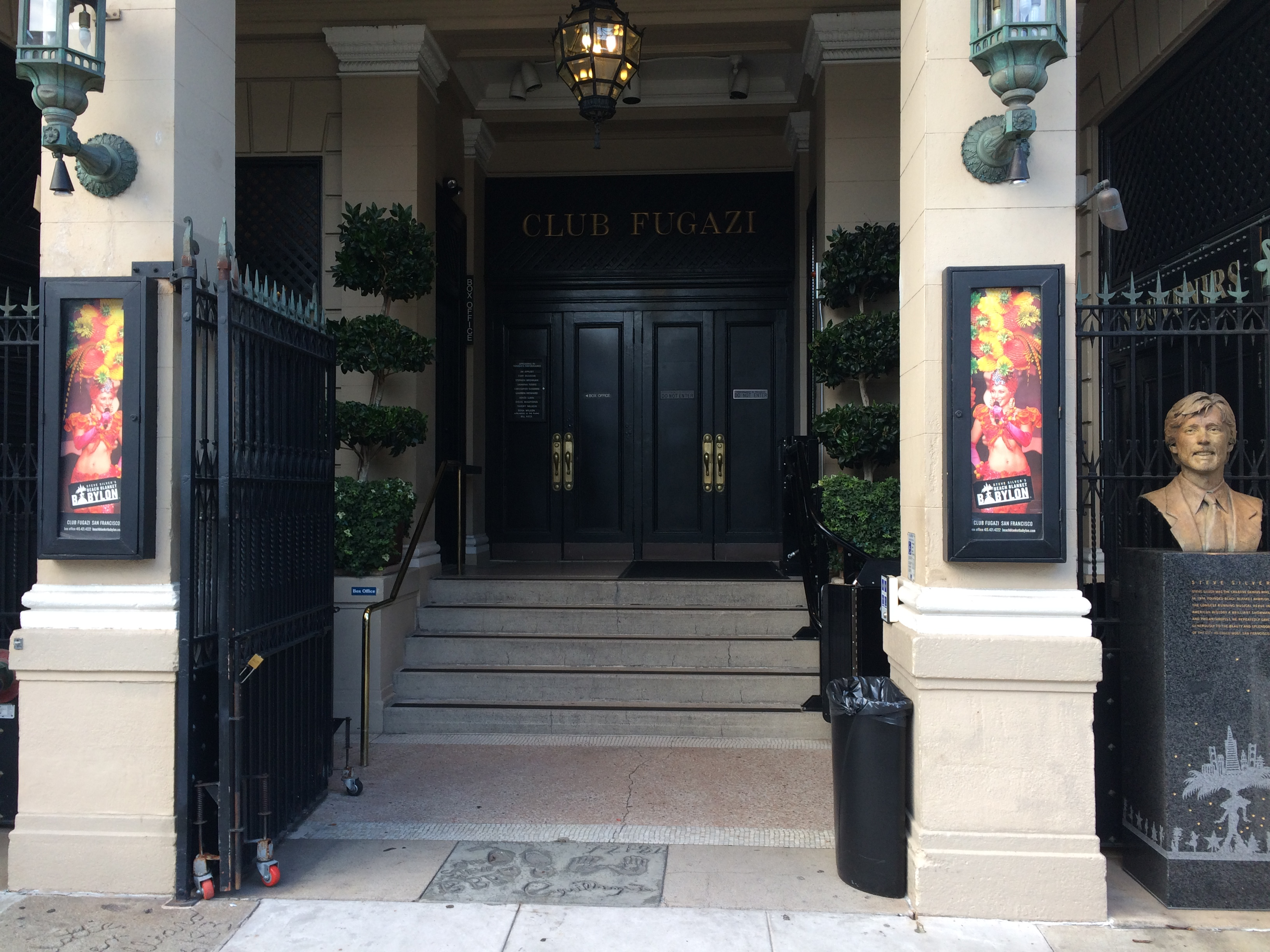
- Interactive map of Club Fugazi
- Address: 678 Green Street; San Francisco, California; United States
- Coordinates: 37°47′57″N 122°24′36″W
- Owner: Italian Community Services
- Production: Dear San Francisco

Construction
- Opened: 1913
- Reopened: September 22, 2021
- Architect: Italo Zanolini

Website
- clubfugazisf.com

The Club Fugazi is a small theater and nightclub located in the North Beach district at 678 Green Street, San Francisco, California.

== Original building and endowment ==
The theater is on the ground floor in a building known as Casa Fugazi (inaugurated as Casa Coloniale Italiana John F. Fugazi), a community center for the Italian Colony of San Francisco. The building was financed by a donation from Cavaliere Ufficiale John F. Fugazi, who founded the Columbus Savings and Loan Society in 1893 as well as the Banca Popolare Operaia Italiana in 1906. Both banks eventually merged with the Bank of Italy, which was later renamed the Bank of America.

Fugazi had promised to establish a community center for the Italian Colony of San Francisco following the Great Earthquake and Fire of 1906, but it wasn't until 1913 that the project began.

Fugazi Hall was built in 1913 on a parcel of land donated by Fugazi's second wife, Johanna Fugazi. The building was designed by Italian architect Italo Zanolini, who also designed the Banca Popolare Operaia Italiana building at 2 Columbus Avenue (1906) most recently occupied by the Church of Scientology, as well as the building at 255 Columbus Avenue (1916), most recently occupied by Vesuvio Restaurant. Zanolini also designed John F. Fugazi's private mausoleum chapel at the Italian Cemetery in Colma.

Fugazi established a trust to ensure that future generations of Italian-Americans would be able to utilize the building. The Trust is administered by Italian Community Services (formally known as the Italian Board of Relief, the Italian Welfare Agency, and Italian-American Community Services Agency), established in 1916.

== 1950s and 1960s ==
In the 1950s and early 1960s, Fugazi Hall was a common venue for poetry reading by members of the Beat community. Although many might believe that Club Fugazi is referenced in Allen Ginsberg's "Howl": "Noon in desolate Fugazzi's, listening to the crack...", this actually refers to Fugazzi's in New York City, another Beat hangout (note the two z's in the name in the poem, as well as all the geographical references in that part of the poem being in NYC.)

The famous Thelonious Alone in San Francisco album was recorded by Thelonious Monk in October 1959 at the Fugazi Hall.

The release party for the debut album by The Grateful Dead was held at Fugazi Hall on the 20th of March 1967.

== Beach Blanket Babylon, 1974–2019 ==
Club Fugazi hosted Beach Blanket Babylon beginning in June, 1974, as a "very funny, very silly revue". It reached over 6.5 million patrons, toured to Las Vegas and London; opened the Academy Awards; and counted Queen Elizabeth II, Prince Charles, David Bowie, Liza Minnelli and Robin Williams among its audience members.

The portion of Green Street in front of the club was renamed Beach Blanket Babylon Boulevard in 1996, in honor of the musical revue.

== Current production ==
In September 2021, The 7 Fingers artistic collective debuted Dear San Francisco. Powered by acrobatics, choreography, spoken word, video projections, shadow play, and original music, the new resident show brings audiences on a romp through both the essence and the myth of San Francisco. From the Gold Rush and 1906 earthquake, to beat poetry and the mysterious fog, San Francisco comes vividly to life, performed by an international cast of world-class acrobats across a variety of disciplines—including hoop diving, Chinese pole, teeterboard, hand-balancing, juggling, and “hand-to-trap”. San Francisco Chronicle gave the show its highest rating, calling it "a love letter not just to the city but also to the human body."
