= Criss-Cross (album) =

Studio album by Thelonious Monk
- Released: August 1963
- Recorded: November 6, 1962 – March 29, 1963
- Genre: Jazz
- Length: 35:19
- Label: Columbia
- Producer: Teo Macero

Thelonious Monk chronology
| Monk's Dream (1963) | Criss-Cross (1963) | Monk in Tokyo (1963) |

Criss-Cross is a studio album by American jazz musician Thelonious Monk, released in August 1963 by Columbia Records. The album consists of previously released Monk compositions that were re-recorded for Columbia by the Thelonious Monk Quartet.

== History ==
Criss-Cross was recorded during and shortly after the sessions for Monk's first Columbia LP, Monk's Dream. The quartet of musicians that appear on the album had been playing together for four years at the time of the recording sessions, and was thus one of the longer-lived bands of Monk's career. The critical and popular success of the group during this period led to Monk's appearance on the cover of Time in February 1964. It later became known that as Monk's international profile was reaching its apex in the mid-1960s, his manic depressive episodes were getting more severe and his composing output was diminished.

Criss-Cross and Monk's other Columbia recordings have been criticized for revisiting well-worn material and offering few new compositions or new perspectives on older works. However, many retrospective reviews for CD reissues of the material have argued that the Columbia recordings have their own virtues, documenting a well-rehearsed band that had thoroughly absorbed the material in a way that some of Monk's 1940s and 1950s studio bands were unable to.

Before entering the studio to record this album, a journalist reportedly asked Monk if he would be recording a new solo rendition of the classic song "Don't Blame Me", to which he replied: "Maybe, it depends on how I feel when I get there." Monk recorded his solo version of "Don't Blame Me" right after arriving at the studio. "Eronel" is a distinctly bop tune that is fast-paced and showcases Monk's virtuosic piano playing. The track "Crepuscule with Nellie" is a piece Monk wrote for his wife.

The track "Pannonica" is available only on CD re-issue and named for Baroness Pannonica de Koenigswarter. Koenigswarter was Monk's friend and patron, and she wrote the liner notes for the original LP.

== Critical reception ==
Professional ratings
Review scores
| Source | Rating |
|---|---|
| All About Jazz | (favorable) |
| AllMusic | 4/5 stars |
| DownBeat | 4.5/5 stars |
| The Penguin Guide to Jazz Recordings | 3/4 stars |
| The Rolling Stone Jazz Record Guide | 4/5 stars |

AllMusic's Lindsay Planer called the album "some of the finest work that Monk ever did in the studio with his '60s trio and quartet."

== Track listing ==
All tracks composed by Thelonious Monk except where noted.

Side one

1. "Hackensack" – 4:12
2. "Tea for Two" (Vincent Youmans, Irving Caesar) – 3:46
3. "Criss Cross" – 4:52
4. "Eronel" (Monk, Idrees Sulieman, Sadik Hakim) – 4:29

Side two

1. "Rhythm-A-Ning" – 3:53
2. "Don't Blame Me" (Retake 1) (Jimmy McHugh, Dorothy Fields) – 7:04
3. "Think of One" – 5:17
4. "Crepuscule with Nellie" – 2:45

1993 CD reissue bonus track:

9. "Pannonica" (Take 2) – 6:46

2003 CD reissue additional bonus tracks:

10. "Coming on the Hudson" (Take 3) – 7:31
11. "Tea for Two" (Take 9) – 5:12
12. "Eronel" (Take 3) – 5:59

=== Notes ===
Track 10 first released on the 1963 Columbia compilation LP The Giants of Jazz. Tracks 11 and 12 previously unreleased.

== Personnel ==
- Thelonious Monk – piano
- Charlie Rouse – tenor saxophone
- John Ore – bass
- Frankie Dunlop – drums

== Charts ==
| Year | Chart | Peak Position |
|---|---|---|
| 1963 | Billboard Top LP's | 127 |
