= Frankie Dunlop =

American jazz musician

Francis Dunlop (December 6, 1928 – July 7, 2014) was an American jazz drummer.

Dunlop, born in Buffalo, New York, grew up in a musical family and began playing piano at age nine and drums at ten. He was playing professionally by age 16 and received some classical education in percussion. He toured with Big Jay McNeely and made recording debut with Moe Koffman in 1950 before serving in the Army during the Korean War. After his discharge he played with Sonny Stitt, Charles Mingus, Sonny Rollins (1958, 1966–67), Maynard Ferguson (1958–60), Lena Horne, Duke Ellington (1960), and Thelonious Monk (1960–64); it is for his recordings with the last of these that he is principally remembered. Later in his life he recorded with Lionel Hampton (1975–81), Earl Hines (1973–74), Ray Crawford, and Joe Zawinul.

In 1984, Dunlop retired, having recorded on over 100 albums.

His brother, Boyd Lee Dunlop, was a jazz pianist who was "rediscovered" while living at a nursing home in Buffalo. He was profiled in a New York Times article in December, 2011.

== Discography ==
=== As sideman ===
With Maynard Ferguson

- A Message from Birdland (Roulette, 1959)
- Swingin' My Way Through College (Roulette, 1959)
- Maynard Ferguson Plays Jazz for Dancing (Roulette, 1959)
- Maynard '64 (Roulette, 1963)

With Lionel Hampton

- Alive & Jumping (MPS, 1978)
- Lionel Hampton and His Band Live at The Muzeval (Timeless, 1978)
- Lionel Hampton and His Jazz Giants 77 (Black and Blue, 1977)
- Aurex Jazz Festival '81 (Eastworld 1981)
- Outrageous (Timeless, 1982)

With Thelonious Monk

- Monk in France (Riverside, 1965)
- Monk's Dream (Columbia, 1963)
- Criss Cross (Columbia, 1963)
- Thelonious Monk in Italy (Riverside, 1963)
- Miles & Monk at Newport (Columbia, 1963)
- Thelonious Monk in Europe Vol. 1 (Riverside, 1963)
- Thelonious Monk in Europe Vol. 2 (Riverside, 1964)
- Thelonious Monk in Europe Vol. 3 (Riverside, 1964)
- Big Band and Quartet in Concert (Columbia, 1964)
- Two Hours with Thelonious (Riverside, 1969)
- Monk in Tokyo (Columbia, 1969)
- Always Know (Columbia, 1979)
- Blue Monk (Baybridge, 1983)
- Blues Five Spot (Milestone, 1984)
- Live! at The Village Gate (Xanadu, 1985)
- Live in Stockholm 1961 (Dragon, 1987)

With others

- Mose Allison, Swingin' Machine (Atlantic, 1963)
- Bill Barron, The Tenor Stylings of Bill Barron (Savoy, 1961)
- Richard Davis, The Philosophy of the Spiritual (Cobblestone, 1972)
- Herman Foster, Have You Heard Herman Foster (Epic, 1960)
- Dodo Greene, Ain't What You Do (Time, 1959)
- Melba Liston, Melba Liston and Her 'Bones (MetroJazz, 1959)
- Billy Mackel, At Last (Black and Blue, 1977)
- Charles Mingus, Tijuana Moods (RCA Victor, 1962)
- Martin Mull, Normal (Capricorn 1974)
- Sonny Rollins, Alfie (Impulse!, 1966)
- Wilbur Ware, The Chicago Sound (Riverside, 1957)
- Randy Weston, Highlife (Colpix, 1963)
- Leo Wright, Soul Talk (Vortex, 1970)
- Joe Zawinul, To You with Love (Strand, 1961)
