= Mulligan Meets Monk =

Studio album by Gerry Mulligan and Thelonious Monk
- Released: 1957
- Recorded: August 12–13, 1957
- Studio: Reeves, New York City
- Genre: Jazz, bebop
- Length: 40:52 (Original LP) 59:31 (reissue)
- Label: Riverside; RLP 12-247
- Producer: Orrin Keepnews

Gerry Mulligan chronology
The Teddy Wilson Trio & Gerry Mulligan Quartet with Bob Brookmeyer at Newport (1957)	Mulligan Meets Monk (1957)	Blues in Time (1957)

Thelonious Monk chronology
Monk's Music (1957)	Mulligan Meets Monk (1957)	Art Blakey's Jazz Messengers with Thelonious Monk (1958)

Professional ratings
Review scores
Source	Rating
AllMusic	4/5 stars
The Encyclopedia of Popular Music	4/5 stars
The Penguin Guide to Jazz	3.5/4 stars
The Rolling Stone Jazz Record Guide	4/5 stars

Mulligan Meets Monk is a studio album by American jazz pianist Thelonious Monk and baritone saxophonist Gerry Mulligan, originally released on Riverside Records in 1957. It has been reissued numerous times. It was remastered for CD in 1987 (on Fantasy's Original Jazz Classics) with three additional alternative takes from the original session.

== Track listing ==
=== Original LP (1957) ===
Side One

1. "'Round Midnight" (Monk, Cootie Williams, Bernie Hanighen) – 8:29
2. "Rhythm-a-Ning" (Monk) – 5:19
3. "Sweet and Lovely" (Gus Arnheim, Jules LeMare, Harry Tobias) – 7:17

Side Two

1. "Decidedly" (Gerry Mulligan) – 5:54
2. "Straight, No Chaser" (Monk) – 7:00
3. "I Mean You" (Monk, Coleman Hawkins) – 6:53

=== Digital re-release (1987) ===
1. "'Round Midnight" – 8:29
2. "Rhythm-a-Ning" – 5:19
3. "Sweet and Lovely" – 7:17
4. "Decidedly" (original stereo take 4) – 5:54
5. "Decidedly" (original mono take 5) – 6:37
6. "Straight, No Chaser" (original take 3) – 7:00
7. "Straight, No Chaser" (alternate take 1) – 5:29
8. "I Mean You" (original take 4) – 6:53
9. "I Mean You" (alternate take 2) – 6:30

== Personnel ==
Musicians

- Gerry Mulligan – baritone saxophone
- Thelonious Monk – piano
- Wilbur Ware – double bass
- Shadow Wilson – drums

Production

- Orrin Keepnews - producer, liner notes
- Jack Higgins - recording engineer
- Robert Parent - cover photo
- Paul Bacon - cover design

For the CD-release (1987)

- Phil De Lancie - digital remastering
- Peter Grant - design
