= At the Blackhawk =

Live album by Thelonious Monk Quartet plus Two
- Released: 1960
- Recorded: April 29, 1960
- Venue: Black Hawk, San Francisco
- Genre: Jazz
- Length: 46:31 (LP); 59:00 (CD reissue)
- Label: Riverside; RLP 12-323
- Producer: Orrin Keepnews

Thelonious Monk Quartet plus Two chronology
Thelonious Alone in San Francisco (1959)	At the Blackhawk (1960)	Thelonious Monk with John Coltrane (1961)

Professional ratings
Review scores
Source	Rating
AllMusic	4.5/5 stars
DownBeat	4.5/5 stars
The Encyclopedia of Popular Music	4/5 stars
The Penguin Guide to Jazz Recordings	3/4 stars
The Rolling Stone Jazz Record Guide	4/5 stars

At the Blackhawk is a live album by American jazz pianist Thelonious Monk, recorded on April 29, 1960, at the Black Hawk and released on Riverside later that year.

== Background ==
Riverside Records had originally planned for the album to be co-led by drummer Shelly Manne. Manne's career was at a high point in 1960, and his quintet released four albums recorded live at the Blackhawk that year. (A fifth album from the recording sessions, which took place in 1959, was released in 1991.) Three tracks of Monk's group with Manne playing drums were recorded at the Blackhawk with Manne on April 28, 1960. These tracks remained unissued until the release of Thelonious Monk: The Complete Riverside Recordings, in 1986. The tracks recorded with Manne were "'Round Midnight", "Just You, Just Me" and "San Francisco Holiday" (a.k.a. "Worry Later"). Contrary to some published accounts, these tracks do include guest musicians Joe Gordon and Harold Land alongside Monk's regular band members Charlie Rouse and John Ore.

Producer Orrin Keepnews felt that the group with Manne playing drums was not musically successful, and Manne agreed and withdrew from the project. Keepnews then called in Billy Higgins as a last-minute replacement for Manne. Higgins, who was based in Los Angeles during this period, had recently garnered national recognition as a member of the Ornette Coleman quartet in 1959 and 1960.

== Track listing ==
All compositions by Thelonious Monk, except as noted.

Original release

Side one

1. "Let's Call This" – 8:32
2. "Four in One" – 8:37
3. "I'm Getting Sentimental over You" (George Bassman, Ned Washington) – 6:07

Side two

1. "Worry Later" – 9:09
2. "'Round Midnight" (Monk, Cootie Williams, Bernie Hanighen) – 12:06
3. "Epistrophy (Closing Theme)" – 2:00

CD reissue

1. "Let's Call This" – 8:33
2. "Four in One" – 8:41
3. "I'm Getting Sentimental over You" (George Bassman, Ned Washington) – 6:14
4. "Epistrophy" (Monk, Kenny Clarke) – 6:41
5. "Evidence" – 7:09
6. "San Francisco Holiday (Worry Later)" – 9:10
7. "'Round Midnight" (Monk, Cootie Williams, Bernie Hanighen) – 12:07
8. "Epistrophy" – 0:59

== Personnel ==
Thelonious Monk Quartet plus Two

- Joe Gordon – trumpet
- Harold Land – tenor saxophone
- Charlie Rouse – tenor saxophone
- Thelonious Monk – piano
- John Ore – bass
- Billy Higgins – drums

Technical personnel

- Orrin Keepnews – producer
- Reice Hamel – recording engineer
