= Piano Solo (Thelonious Monk album) =

Studio album by Thelonious Monk
- Released: 1954
- Recorded: June 4, 1954
- Genre: Jazz
- Label: Disques Vogue

Thelonious Monk 10-inch LP chronology
Sonny Rollins and Thelonious Monk (1954)	Piano Solo (1954)

Thelonious Monk chronology
Genius of Modern Music: Volume 2 (1952)	Piano Solo (1954)	Thelonious Monk Trio (1954/1956)

Piano Solo is a 1954 album by jazz pianist and composer Thelonious Monk, recorded in Paris, France, on June 4, 1954, originally for a radio broadcast.

The original album was released on the French Disques Vogue label as a 10" LP. Several of the song titles were listed inaccurately on the original release, and Monk's first name included an extra 'o'. The material has been re-released over the years, under a number of titles, on GNP Crescendo and other labels. Some releases include "Hackensack" as an additional track, sometimes listed inaccurately as "Well You Needn't (take 2)."

A 2017 re-release by Sony contains all tracks from the original, but in recording order (now reported as being from Club d'Essai, Paris—this was the location of the recording studio); plus, for the first time, an announcement by André Francis. This edition also includes previously unreleased tracks from Monk's June 1 and 3, 1954 trio concerts at the Salle Pleyel, Paris.

== Track listing ==
All compositions by Thelonious Monk except where indicated.

=== Side 1 ===
1. 'Round About Midnight
2. Evidence [originally listed as "Reflections"]
3. Smoke Gets in Your Eyes (Jerome Kern)
4. Well You Needn't

=== Side 2 ===
1. Reflections [originally listed as "Portrait Of An Ermite"]
2. We See [originally listed as "Manganése"]
3. Eronel
4. Off Minor

== 2017 Sony expanded release ==
1. Introduction by André Francis 0:52
2. Evidence 3:05
3. Smoke Gets in Your Eyes 3:27
4. Hackensack 3:04
5. 'Round Midnight 5:18
6. Eronel 2:34
7. Off Minor 2:34
8. Well, You Needn't 3:28
9. Portrait of an Ermite (Reflections) 5:00
10. Manganese (We See) 2:36
11. Announcement (Presenter – Jacques Souplet) 1:31
12. Well, You Needn't (Live At Salle Pleyel, 6/1/1954) 6:02
13. 'Round Midnight (Live At Salle Pleyel, 6/1/1954) 5:18
14. Off Minor (Live At Salle Pleyel, 6/1/1954) 5:10
15. Hackensack / Epistrophy (Live At Salle Pleyel, 6/1/1954) 3:32
16. 'Round Midnight (Incomplete) (Live At Salle Pleyel, 6/3/1954) 2:56

=== Personnel ===
- Bass – Jean-Marie Ingrand (tracks 11 to 16)
- Drums – Jean-Louis Viale (tracks 11 to 15)
- Drums [Probably] – Gérard "Dave" Pochonet (tracks 16)
