= Monk's Music =

Studio album by Thelonious Monk
- Released: November 1957
- Recorded: June 25–26, 1957
- Studios: Reeves, New York City
- Genre: Hard bop
- Length: 38:24
- Label: Riverside
- Producer: Orrin Keepnews

Thelonious Monk chronology
Thelonious Himself (1957)	Monk's Music (1957)	Mulligan Meets Monk (1957)

Monk's Music is a jazz album by the Thelonious Monk Septet, which for this recording included Coleman Hawkins and John Coltrane. It was released in November 1957 through Riverside Records. The recording was made in New York City on June 26, 1957.

== Recording and music ==
The first song, "Abide With Me"—a hymn by W. H. Monk—is played only by the septet's horn section. The song "Ruby, My Dear" is performed only by Monk, Coleman Hawkins, Wilbur Ware, and Art Blakey. John Coltrane had joined Monk after playing with the Miles Davis Quintet, and Monk can be heard enthusiastically calling on him ("Coltrane! Coltrane!") to take the first horn solo on the album in "Well, You Needn't." All of the tracks except "Abide With Me" are original compositions by Monk; all of the originals but "Crepuscule with Nellie" had previously appeared on record. This is the only record where Hawkins and Blakey recorded together.

=== Mono vis-à-vis stereo ===
This was the first Riverside Thelonious Monk album recorded and released in both mono (RLP 12-242) and stereo (RLP 1102). The stereo version was released nine months after the mono release, in August 1958. It has been noted that the mixes of these releases are extremely different. The stereo mix, while featuring the same performances as does the mono version, used an entirely different set of microphones, suspended from the ceiling, while the mono release used microphones in closer proximity to the instruments. As a result, the stereo mix has a more distant sound and Wilbur Ware's bass is much less audible.

Producer Orrin Keepnews explained:

Our new stereo series had begun with a sound effects disc, so Riverside 1102 [Monk's Music] was our first stereo jazz album. But we had to deal with the fact that the studio had not yet taken the drastic step of converting to the new process: the installed equipment at Reeves Sound Studios (on 2nd Avenue between 44th and 45th Streets in Manhattan) was still monaural. Thus, we had to improvise a dual system. Studio engineer Jack Higgins presided at his usual control panel; our staff engineer Ray Fowler was in the soundproof isolation booths in the studio with a newfangled portable stereo tape recorder. Thus, on this and several subsequent occasions, ‘binaural’ was an entirely separate operation. Among other things, every musician found himself surrounded by a doubled quantity of microphones.”

In the notes to the 1986 Riverside Monk box, Keepnews wrote: "This was one of our very first stereo recordings (although the separate machine failed us on Crepuscule); confusingly, the monaural version has sometimes been used in reissues, but I have managed to include here in stereo form everything that is available in that form."

The original stereo LP release did not list "Crepuscule with Nellie" on its label or cover track listing, although it was referenced in the liner notes, and did not include it on the album. A mid-1960s stereo re-release with serial number RLP 12-9242 also skipped "Crepuscule with Nellie", even though it was listed on the label and cover (as "Crepescule with Nellie" [sic]). The 1967 "stereo" pressing (RS 3004) distributed by ABC Records was an "electronically reprocessed" version of the mono mix. A 1977 Japanese vinyl version appears to be the first true stereo release that also includes the mono recording of "Crepuscule with Nellie".

== Reception ==
Professional ratings
Review scores
Source	Rating
AllMusic	4.5/5 stars
The Encyclopedia of Popular Music	4/5 stars
The Penguin Guide to Jazz Recordings	4/4 stars
Pitchfork	9.1/10
The Rolling Stone Jazz Record Guide	5/5 stars

The album was inducted into the Grammy Hall of Fame in 2001.

== Track listing ==
All songs by Thelonious Monk unless otherwise noted.

Side A

1. "Abide with Me" (Henry Francis Lyte, William Henry Monk) – 0:54
2. "Well, You Needn't" – 11:24
3. "Ruby, My Dear" – 5:26

Side B

1. "Off Minor" – 5:07
2. "Epistrophy" (Monk, Kenny Clarke) – 10:46
3. "Crepuscule with Nellie" – 4:38

CD reissue

1. "Abide with Me" – 0:54
2. "Well, You Needn't" – 11:24
3. "Ruby, My Dear" – 5:26
4. "Off Minor (Take 5)" – 5:07
5. "Off Minor (Take 4)" – 5:12
6. "Epistrophy" – 10:46
7. "Crepuscule with Nellie (Take 6)" – 4:38
8. "Crepuscule with Nellie (Take 4 and 5)" – 4:43

Original Jazz Classics Remasters

1. "Abide with Me" – 0:54
2. "Well, You Needn't" – 11:24
3. "Ruby, My Dear" – 5:26
4. "Off Minor (Take 5)" – 5:07
5. "Epistrophy" – 10:46
6. "Crepuscule with Nellie (Take 6)" – 4:38
7. "Off Minor (Take 4)" – 5:12
8. "Crepuscule with Nellie (Takes 4 and 5)" – 4:43
9. "Blues for Tomorrow" – 13:32

== Personnel ==
- Thelonious Monk – piano on tracks 2–6
- Ray Copeland – trumpet on tracks 1, 2, 4–6
- Gigi Gryce – alto saxophone and arrangements on tracks 1, 2, 4–6
- Coleman Hawkins – tenor saxophone
- John Coltrane – tenor saxophone on tracks 1, 2, 4–6
- Wilbur Ware – double bass on tracks 2–6
- Art Blakey – drums on tracks 2–6
- Orrin Keepnews – production
- Jack Higgins – recording engineering
- Kirk Felton – digital remastering
- Paul Weller – cover photography
- Paul Bacon – cover design
