= In Walked Bud =

1947 jazz composition by Thelonious Monk

Song
- Written: 1947
- Genre: Jazz
- Composer: Thelonious Monk
- Lyricist: Jon Hendricks

"In Walked Bud" is a 1947 jazz composition by Thelonious Monk. It was composed by Monk in honor of his friend, fellow pianist Bud Powell, and based in part on the Irving Berlin standard "Blue Skies". Monk recorded many renditions of "In Walked Bud" throughout his career, and it has been covered numerous times by other artists.

== Composition and inspiration ==
"In Walked Bud" was based on the chord progression of "Blue Skies", an early pop standard composed in 1927 by Irving Berlin. Monk composed "In Walked Bud" as a tribute to friend and fellow jazz pianist Bud Powell.

Many biographies of Powell have cited "In Walked Bud" as Monk's gratitude for Powell's actions in his defense during a police raid of the Savoy Ballroom in 1945. According to Monk biographer Thomas Fitterling, the police raided the venue and singled out Monk, who refused to show his identification and was arrested with force. Powell, a fan of Monk's, then attempted to prevent the police from the door and yelled, "Stop, you don't know what you're doing. You're mistreating the greatest pianist in the world." According to this account, Powell was struck in the head by a police officer with a nightstick, suffering an injury that led to a pattern of institutionalizations and destructive behavior that plagued the rest of his career. Other sources have explained Powell's injury differently; Miles Davis said Powell was beaten by a Savoy Ballroom bouncer after walking in the club without any money, while Dexter Gordon claimed he was beaten while in police custody after his arrest for drunk and disorderly conduct in a Philadelphia train station.

== Recordings ==
Monk recorded "In Walked Bud" several times during his career, starting with the 1947 sessions later compiled for Genius of Modern Music (1951). According to music critic Robert Christgau, Monk's rendition of the song for his 1958 live album Misterioso featured "a long, laconically hilarious (and laconically, hilariously virtuosic) Johnny Griffin solo that's a landmark of saxophony". The last recording by Monk was for his 1968 record Underground, featuring lyrics and vocals by Jon Hendricks. The song has since been covered by numerous artists.

Hendricks' lyrics refer to jazz musicians Dizzy Gillespie, Oscar Pettiford, and Don Byas, in addition to Monk and Powell.

Jon Batiste released and included his version of "In Walked Bud" in his August 2026 album titled "Monk Movements" - one of two albums by Batiste dedicated entirely to covers/renditions of Monk works.
