= Thelonious Himself =

Studio album by Thelonious Monk
- Released: 1957
- Recorded: April 5 and 16, 1957; New York City
- Genre: Jazz
- Length: 66:28
- Label: Riverside; RLP 12-235
- Producer: Orrin Keepnews

Thelonious Monk chronology
Brilliant Corners (1957)	Thelonious Himself (1957)	Monk's Music (1957)

Thelonious Himself is a studio album by Thelonious Monk released in 1957 by Riverside Records. It was Monk's fourth album for the label. The album features Monk playing solo piano, except for the final track, "Monk's Mood", which features John Coltrane on tenor saxophone and Wilbur Ware on bass. It was Monk's second solo piano studio album, and it was the first made by an American label and distributed in the United States. (Monk's first extended solo piano recording, Piano Solo, was recorded in Paris during June 1954, initially for the purpose of providing material for a radio broadcast. Monk had also recorded individual solo piano tracks for Prestige and Riverside records during the early and mid 1950s.)

The original CD reissue, released in 1987 via Original Jazz Classics/Riverside Records, includes an extensive 22-minute solo recording of "'Round Midnight" outtakes and experimentation in the studio. A subsequent reissue, the Keepnews Collection edition, released in 2008 via Riverside Records, omits this sequence in favor of outtakes and alternate versions of several other tracks from the album. In the liner notes, Keepnews states that including the original "'Round Midnight" outtake "would have required eliminating virtually every existing alternate take of other selections — five other examples of this pianist's improvisational genius."

== Cover ==
The cover photograph was taken by Paul Weller, and shows Monk in the control room of Reeves Sound Studios (where the album was recorded) seated at a mixing console.

== Critical reception ==
Professional ratings
Review scores
Source	Rating
Disc	5/5 stars
The Penguin Guide to Jazz Recordings	4/4 stars

Music critic Robert Christgau said Thelonious Himself is "probably [Monk's] best" solo album, while Down Beat magazine gave it five stars and called it "highly recommended". In All Music Guide (2001), jazz critic Scott Yanow gave the album four stars out of five and did not find it as important but still intriguing because "Monk's hesitant stride and thoughtful yet unpredictable flights are always a joy to hear".

== Track listing ==
=== Original vinyl release (1957) ===
Side One

1. April in Paris
2. Ghost of a Chance
3. Functional [Take 2]
4. I'm Gettin' Sentimental Over You

Side Two

1. I Should Care
2. 'Round Midnight
3. All Alone
4. Monk's Mood — featuring John Coltrane, Wilbur Ware

=== Original CD reissue (1987) ===
1. "April in Paris" – 3:50
2. "(I Don't Stand) A Ghost of a Chance (With You)" – 4:21
3. "Functional" – 9:18
4. "I'm Gettin' Sentimental Over You" – 4:03
5. "I Should Care" – 3:14
6. "'Round Midnight" – 6:39
7. "All Alone" – 4:49
8. "Monk's Mood" - 7:49
9. "'Round Midnight (in progress)" - 21:59

=== Keepnews Collection reissue (2008) ===
1. "April in Paris" – 3:54
2. "(I Don't Stand) A Ghost of a Chance (With You)" – 4:24
3. "Functional (take 2)" – 9:22
4. "I'm Gettin' Sentimental Over You" – 4:08
5. "I Should Care (take 3)" – 3:15
6. "'Round Midnight" – 6:44
7. "All Alone" – 4:53
8. "Monk's Mood (false start)" - :58
9. "Monk's Mood" - 7:53
10. "(I Don't Stand) A Ghost of a Chance (With You)" – 4:13
11. "Functional (take 1)" – 9:44
12. "I Should Care (take 1)" – 3:29
13. "I Should Care (take 2)" – 3:18

== Personnel ==
- Thelonious Monk - piano
- John Coltrane - tenor sax (on "Monk's Mood")
- Wilbur Ware - bass (on "Monk's Mood")
