= The Thelonious Monk Orchestra at Town Hall =

Live album by Thelonious Monk
- Released: 1959
- Recorded: February 28, 1959
- Venue: The Town Hall, New York City
- Genre: Jazz
- Length: 38:47
- Label: Riverside
- Producer: Orrin Keepnews

Thelonious Monk chronology
Misterioso (1958)	The Thelonious Monk Orchestra at Town Hall (1959)	5 by Monk by 5 (1959)

The Thelonious Monk Orchestra at Town Hall is an album by Thelonious Monk, released in 1959. The concert included Hall Overton’s arrangements on Monk’s tunes (including a transcription of Monk's piano solo on "Little Rootie Tootie").

The concert features, among others, Charlie Rouse on tenor in his first recording with Monk. Rouse went on to record and perform live with Monk through 1969.

== Reception ==
Professional ratings
Review scores
Source	Rating
AllMusic	5/5 stars
The Penguin Guide to Jazz Recordings	3.5/4 stars
The Rolling Stone Jazz Record Guide	5/5 stars
The Virgin Encyclopedia of Jazz	3/5 stars

The editors of AllMusic awarded the album a full 5 stars, and reviewer Scott Yanow called it "a major success" and "a real standout."

A reviewer for Billboard stated that the album is "a must for Monk's fans," but noted that it "features some of the best and some of the worst of the pianist and the ork."

Murray Horwitz of NPR Music described the album as "an important expression of a very important jazz composer" as well as "a whole lot of fun," and wrote: "One test of good composition is how well it stands up to reinterpretation. This music truly does."

The authors of The Penguin Guide to Jazz Recordings suggested that "the band could probably have used a lot more time to figure out the composer's vision," and commented: "in general the ensemble catches only elements of Monk's intentions: his peculiar truce between a sober gaiety, bleak humour and thunderous intensity is a difficult thing for a big band to realize."

== Track listing ==
=== The 1959 vinyl album ===
Side one

1. "Thelonious" – 0:56
2. "Friday the 13th" – 9:22
3. "Monk's Mood" – 10:15

Side two

1. "Little Rootie Tootie" – 8:45
2. "Off Minor" – 7:47
3. "Crepuscule with Nellie" – 4:42

=== The 2006 CD rerelease ===
1. "Thelonious" – 3:04
2. "Friday the 13th" – 9:34
3. "Monk's Mood" – 10:27
4. "Little Rootie Tootie" – 8:56
5. "Off Minor" – 7:56
6. "Crepuscule with Nellie" – 4:53
7. "Little Rootie Tootie (Encore)" – 8:29
8. "In Walked Bud" - 7:09
9. "Blue Monk" - 8:21
10. "Rhythm-a-Ning" - 6:45

== Personnel ==
- Thelonious Monk — piano
- Donald Byrd — trumpet
- Eddie Bert — trombone
- Robert Northern — French horn
- Jay McAllister — tuba
- Phil Woods — alto saxophone
- Charlie Rouse — tenor saxophone
- Pepper Adams — baritone saxophone
- Sam Jones — bass
- Art Taylor — drums

== Tributes ==
As from 2010, American jazz pianist Jason Moran went on tour with his project IN MY MIND, a multimedia presentation heavily inspired by Thelonious Monk's concert at The Town Hall.
