= Leonello Casucci =

Italian composer

Leonello Casucci (1885–1975) was an Italian composer.

Casucci was born in Pistoia, Tuscany in 1885 and is best known for having composed the music of the famous 1929 hit song Schöner Gigolo, armer Gigolo in 1928. The original lyrics are in German, written by Julius Brammer in 1924, and were translated into English as "Just a Gigolo" by Irving Caesar. An Italian version of the lyrics was published in 1930 by Enrico Frati under the title Gigolò. Casucci died in Desenzano del Garda, Lombardy in 1975, at the age of 89.
