= Blue Note Sessions =

"The Blue Note Sessions" and variants thereof usually refer to material recorded by Blue Note Records. Releases of this material include:

- Thelonious Monk Blue Note Sessions (1947-1952), by pianist Thelonious Monk
- Introducing Kenny Burrell: The First Blue Note Sessions (2000), by guitarist Kenny Burrell
- The Complete Blue Note 45 Sessions (1987), of saxophonist Ike Quebec, #121
- The Complete Blue Note Hank Mobley Fifties Sessions (1998), by saxophonist Hank Mobley, #181
- The Complete Edmond Hall/James P. Johnson/Sidney De Paris/Vic Dickenson Blue Note Sessions (1985); see Mosaic Records discography, #109
- The Complete Art Hodes Blue Note Sessions (1944); see Art Hodes
- The Pete Johnson/Earl Hines/Teddy Bunn Blue Note Sessions (1987); see Mosaic Records discography, #119
- The Complete Blue Note 1964-66 Jackie McLean Sessions (1994), see Jacknife (album), #150
- The Complete February 1957 Jimmy Smith Blue Note Sessions (1994); see Mosaic Records discography, #154
- The Complete Blue Note Andrew Hill Sessions (1963-66) (1995); see One for One (Andrew Hill album)
- The Complete Blue Note Lee Morgan Fifties Sessions (1995); see Mosaic Records discography, #162
- The Complete Blue Note/UA Curtis Fuller Sessions; see Two Bones
- The Complete Blue Note Sam Rivers Sessions; Sam Rivers (jazz musician) § Compilations
- The Complete Blue Note Blue Mitchell Sessions (1963-67) (1998); see Mosaic Records discography, #178
- The Complete Blue Note Donald Byrd/Pepper Adams Studio Sessions (1999); see Mosaic Records discography, #194
- The Complete Blue Note Elvin Jones Sessions (1999); see Mosaic Records discography, #195
- The Complete Blue Note Horace Parlan Session (2000); see Mosaic Records discography, #197
- The Blue Note Stanley Turrentine Quintet/Sextet Studio Sessions (2002); see Mosaic Records discography, #212
- The Complete Blue Note Lou Donaldson Sessions 1957-1960 (2002); see Mosaic Records discography, #215

== See also ==
- Blue Note Recordings (disambiguation)
- Blue Note (disambiguation)
