= Blue Note Recordings =

"The Blue Note Recordings" and variants thereof usually refer either to material recorded by Blue Note Records, or to material recorded at the Blue Note Jazz Club or other venues of similar name. Releases of these recordings include:

== Blue Note Records ==
- The Complete Blue Note Recordings of Thelonious Monk, release of the Thelonious Monk Blue Note Sessions, by pianist Thelonious Monk
- The Classic Blue Note Recordings of Dexter Gordon; see Mosaic Records discography (MS-014)
- The Complete Blue Note & Roost Recordings of Bud Powell; see Mosaic Records discography (#116), 1986
- The Complete Blue Note and Capitol Recordings of Fats Navarro and Tadd Dameron, see Fats Navarro, 1948
- The Complete Blue Note Recordings of Albert Ammons and Meade Lux Lewis; see Mosaic Records discography (#103), 1983
- The Complete Blue Note and Pacific Jazz Recordings of Clifford Brown, see Clifford Brown, 1984
- The Complete Blue Note Recordings of the Tina Brooks Quintet, see Back to the Tracks
- The Complete Blue Note Forties Recordings of Ike Quebec and John Hardee; see Mosaic Records discography (#107), 1984
- The Complete Blue Note Recordings of Sidney Bechet; see Mosaic Records discography (#110), 1985
- The Complete Bud Powell Blue Note Recordings; see Mosaic Records discography (#116), 1986
- The Complete Blue Note Recordings of Herbie Nichols, see Herbie Nichols Trio, 1997
- The Complete Blue Note Recordings of Freddie Redd, see Freddie Redd, 1989
- The Complete Blue Note Recordings of George Lewis; see Mosaic Records discography (#132), 1990
- The Complete Blue Note Recordings of Grant Green with Sonny Clark, see The Complete Quartets with Sonny Clark, 1990
- The Complete Blue Note Recordings of Larry Young; see Mosaic Records discography (#137), 1991
- The Complete Blue Note Recordings of Art Blakey's 1960 Jazz Messengers, see Pisces (Art Blakey album), 1960
- The Complete Blue Note Recordings of Don Cherry, see Symphony for Improvisers
- The Complete Blue Note/UA/Roulette Recordings of Thad Jones; see Mosaic Records discography (#172), 1997

== Blue Note venues ==
- Live at the Blue Note (Duke Ellington album), recorded in Chicago
- The Classic Blue Note Recordings by Wayne Shorter
- Keith Jarrett at the Blue Note: The Complete Recordings
- Live at the Blue Note (Michel Camilo album)
- The Very Tall Band: Live at the Blue Note by Oscar Peterson

== See also ==
- Blue Note Sessions (disambiguation)
- Blue note (disambiguation)
