= Jimmy Oliver (musician) =

American musical artist (1920–2005)

- Birth name: James Henry Oliver
- Born: April 28, 1920; Philadelphia, Pennsylvania
- Died: February 4, 2005 (aged 84)
- Genres: Jazz
- Occupation: Musician
- Instrument: Saxophones
- Years active: 1946-2005

James Henry Oliver (April 28, 1920 - February 4, 2005) was a tenor saxophonist and bandleader based in Philadelphia. Active from the mid-1940s, his bands, including the house band at local venues, featured, among other musicians, Philly Joe Jones, Steve Davis, Red Garland, Johnny Coles Charlie Rice, Sam Reed and Mickey Roker. He has been cited as one of several sax players who influenced John Coltrane.

Turning down the temptation to work in New York, he preferred to play locally in Philadelphia, alongside local jazz stars such as Bootsie Barnes, the Heath Brothers and Philly Joe Jones as well as visiting stars Charlie Parker, Pearl Bailey and Max Roach, and, especially around 1946-47, while in residence at the Zanzibar Café, he was noted for playing "against" visitors Lester Young, Coleman Hawkins, Ben Webster, Dexter Gordon, Illinois Jacquet, Arnett Cobb, George Auld and Charlie Ventura.

On one of his very few known recordings, on September 16, 1950, Oliver sat in for John Coltrane, who was ill, and recorded with the Dizzy Gillespie sextet for Prestige. The album, Prestige 1st Sessions, Vol. 3, released in 1994, features a solo by Oliver on the track "She's Gone Again".

He also appears on Papa Jo Jones' last recording, Our Man, Papa Jo! (1982), with Hank Jones, Major Holley.
