= Mosaic Records discography =

Mosaic Records' logo

This is the discography of Mosaic Records the American jazz record company and label established in 1982 by Michael Cuscuna and Charlie Lourie. Over three decades the jazz press and general publications have recognized Mosaic, with The New York Times naming it "the most distinctive reissue label in jazz", All About Jazz calling the company "arguably the premiere reissue label in jazz", and Esquire suggesting it is "America's most obsessive jazz label".

This discography includes Limited Edition Box Sets (of various numbers of LPs or CDs), Vinyl Set Series (of various numbers of LPs), Selects (3 CDs) and Singles (one CD). The majority of the company's music leases over its 30+ years of operating are now expired, with the releases becoming sought after, expensive collector's items.

== Box Sets #101-150 / 1983-1994 ==
The complete collections below are listed in detail under the name of the musician or the label (will be updated continuously):

- #101-1983: Thelonious Monk – The Complete Blue Note Recordings
- #102-1983: Gerry Mulligan – The Complete Pacific Jazz and Capitol Recordings of the Original Quartet and Tentette with Chet Baker
- #103-1983: Albert Ammons & Meade Lux Lewis – The Complete Blue Note Recordings
- #104-1984: Clifford Brown – The Complete Blue Note and Pacific Jazz Recordings
- #105-1983: Art Pepper – The Complete Pacific Jazz Small Group Recordings
- #106-1985: Tina Brooks – The Complete Blue Note Recordings of the Quintets
- #107-1984: Ike Quebec & John Hardee – The Complete Blue Note Recordings
- #108-1984: The Complete Recordings of The Port of Harlem Jazzmen
- #109-1985: Edmond Hall, James P. Johnson, Sidney De Paris, & Vic Dickenson – The Complete Blue Note Sessions
- #110-1985: Sidney Bechet – The Complete Blue Note Recordings
- #111-1985: Charles Mingus – The Complete Candid Recordings
- #112-1985: Thelonious Monk – The Complete Black Lion and Vogue Recordings
- #113-1986: Chet Baker – The Complete Pacific Jazz Live Recordings of the Quartet with Russ Freeman
- #114-1986: Art Hodes – The Complete Blue Note Sessions
- #115-1986: Benny Morton/Jimmy Hamilton (with Sammy Benskin) – The Blue Note Swingtets (1945)
- #116-1986: Bud Powell – The Complete Blue Note Recordings (1949–1958)
- #117-1986: Buddy DeFranco – The Complete Verve Recordings of the Quartett/Quintett with Sonny Clark
- #118-1987: Herbie Nichols – The Complete Blue Note Recordings
- #119-1987: Pete Johnson/Earl Hines/Teddy Bunn – The Blue Note Sessions (1939–1940)
- #120-1987: Paul Desmond – The Complete Recordings of the Quartet with Jim Hall
- #121-1987: Ike Quebec – The Complete Blue Note 45 Sessions
- #122-1987: Chet Baker – The Complete Pacific Jazz Studio Recordings of the Quartet with Russ Freeman
- #123-1988: Commodore Records – The Complete Jazz Recordings (Volume 1)
- #124-1989: Freddie Redd – The Complete Blue Note Recordings
- #125-1989: Shorty Rogers – The Complete Atlantic and EMI Jazz Recordings
- #126-1989: Johnny Hodges – The Complete Recordings (1951–1955)
- #127-1989: Cecil Taylor and Buell Neidlinger – The Complete Candid Recordings
- #128-1989: Commodore Records – The Complete Jazz Recordings (Volume 2)
- #129-1990: Charlie Parker – The Complete Dean Benedetti Recordings
- #130-1990: T-Bone Walker – The Complete Recordings (1940–1954)
- #131-1990: Stan Getz – The Complete Recordings of the Quintet with Jimmy Raney
- #132-1990: George Lewis – The Complete Blue Note Recordings
- #133-1991: Grant Green – The Complete Blue Note Recordings with Sonny Clark
- #134-1990: Commodore Records – The Complete Jazz Recordings (Volume 3)
- #135-1991: Count Basie – The Complete Roulette Live Recordings (1959–1962)
- #136-1991: Stan Kenton – The Complete Capitol Recordings of the Bill Holman & Bill Russo Charts
- #137-1991: Larry Young – The Complete Blue Note Recordings
- #138-1991: Nat King Cole – The Complete Capitol Recordings of the Trio
- #139-1991 Otis Spann/Lightnin' Hopkins – The Complete Candid Sessions
- #140-1990: Earl Hines, Claude Hopkins, Cliff Jackson, Keith Dunham, Sonny White, Jay McShann, Teddy Wilson, Cliff Smalls, Sir Charles Thompson, Gloria Hearn & Ram Ramirez – The Complete Master Jazz Recordings Piano Series
- #141-1992: Art Blakey – The Complete Blue Note Recordings of the 1960 Jazz Messengers
- #142-1992: Woody Shaw – The Complete CBS Studio Recordings
- #143-1993: Charles Mingus – The Complete 1959 CBS Sessions
- #144-1993: Buck Clayton – The Complete CBS Jam Sessions
- #145-1993: Don Cherry – The Complete Blue Note Recordings of Don Cherry
- #146-1993: Louis Armstrong – The Complete Decca Studio Recordings of the All Stars
- #147-1993: Serge Chaloff – The Complete Sessions
- #148-1993: Benny Goodman – The Complete Capitol Small Group Recording (1944–1955)
- #149-1993: Count Basie – The Complete Roulette Studio Recordings
- #150-1994: Jackie McLean – The Complete Blue Note Sessions 1964–66

== Box Sets #151-200 / 1994-2000 ==
- #151-1994: Thad Jones/Mel Lewis Orchestra – The Complete Solid State Recordings
- #152-1994: Eddie Condon – The Complete CBS Recordings of his All Stars
- #153-1994: Charles Brown – The Complete Aladdin Records Recordings
- #154-1994: Jimmy Smith – The Complete February 1957 Blue Note Sessions
- #155-1994: Amos Milburn – The Complete Aladdin Recordings
- #156-1994: Maynard Ferguson – The Complete Roulette Orchestra Recordings
- #157-1994: George Shearing – The Complete Capitol Live Recordings
- #158-1994: Miles Davis – The Complete Plugged Nickel Sessions
- #159-1995: Phil Woods – The Quartet/Quintet 20th Anniversary Set
- #160-1995: Duke Ellington – The Complete Capitol Recordings
- #161-1995: Andrew Hill – The Complete Blue Note Session (1963–1966)
- #162-1995: Lee Morgan – The Complete Blue Note Fifties Sessions
- #163-1995: Stan Kenton – The Complete Capitol Studio Recordings (1943–1947)
- #164-1996: Miles Davis & Gil Evans – The Complete CBS Studio Recordings
- #165-1996: Illinois Jacquet – The Complete Sessions (1945–1950)
- #166-1996: Curtis Fuller – The Complete Blue Note/UA Sessions
- #167-1996: Sam Rivers – The Complete Blue Note Sessions
- #168-1996: Jack Teagarden – The Complete Capitol Fifties Sessions
- #169-1996: J. J. Johnson – The Complete Columbia Small Group Sessions
- #170-1997: Capitol Records – Classic Capitol Jazz Sessions
- #171-1997: Bill Evans – The Final Village Vanguard Sessions–June 1980
- #172-1997: Thad Jones – The Complete Blue Note/UA/Roulette Recordings
- #173-1997: Teddy Wilson – The Complete Verve Recordings of the Trio
- #174-1997: Lennie Tristano, Lee Konitz, & Warne Marsh – The Complete Atlantic Recordings
- #175-1997: Chico Hamilton – The Complete Pacific Jazz Recordings of the Quintet
- #176-1997: Jimmy Giuffre – The Complete Capitol and Atlantic Recordings
- #177-XXXX: Miles Davis – The Complete Quintet Studio Recordings 1965–June 1968
- #178-1998: Blue Mitchell – The Complete Blue Note Sessions (1963–1967)
- #179-1998: Atlantic Records – The New Orleans Jazz Sessions (1958–1962)
- #180-1998: Bud Shank – The Pacific Jazz Studio Sessions
- #181-1998: Hank Mobley – The Complete Blue Note Fifties Sessions
- #182-1998: Charlie Ventura & Flip Phillips – The Complete Verve/Clef Studio Sessions
- #183-1998: Miles Davis – The Complete Bitches Brew
- #184-1998: Peggy Lee & June Christy – The Complete Capitol Transcription Sessions
- #185-1999: Bob Cooper, Bill Holman, & Frank Rosolino – Kenton Presents Jazz
- #186-1999: Stuff Smith – The Complete Verve Sessions
- #187-1999: The Complete H.R.S. Sessions
- #188-1999: Anita O’Day – The Complete Verve/Clef Sessions
- #189-1999: Kid Ory – The Complete Verve Sessions
- #190-1999: Django Reinhardt – The Complete Swing/His Master's Voice Sessions (1936–1948)
- #191-: Miles Davis With John Coltrane – The Complete Columbia Recordings
- #192-1999: Gene Krupa & Harry James – The Complete Capitol Recordings
- #193-1999: Duke Ellington – The Reprise Studio Recordings
- #194-1999: Donald Byrd/Pepper Adams – The Complete Blue Note Studio Sessions
- #195-1999: Elvin Jones – The Complete Blue Note Sessions
- #196–2000: Woody Herman – The Complete Capitol Recordings
- #197-2000: Horace Parlan – The Complete Blue Note Session
- #198-2000: Gerald Wilson – The Complete Pacific Jazz Recordings of his Orchestra
- #199-2000: Columbia Records – The Jazz Piano Moods Sessions
- #200-2000: Johnny Hodges – The Complete Verve Small Group Sessions 1956–1961

== Box Sets #201-250 / 2000-2011 ==
- #201-2000: Max Roach – The Complete Mercury Plus Four Sessions
- #202-2000: Lee Morgan & Wayne Shorter – The Complete Vee Jay Sessions
- #203-2000: The Four Freshmen – The Complete Capitol Fifties Sessions
- #204-2000: Mildred Bailey – The Complete Columbia Recordings
- #205-2000: Paul Chambers & Wynton Kelly – The Complete Vee Jay Sessions 1959–61
- #206-2001: Eddie Condon – Classic Columbia Condon Mob Sessions
- #207-2001: Joe Pass – The Complete Pacific Jazz Quartet Sessions
- #208-2001: Sonny Stitt – The Complete Roost Studio Sessions (1952–1963)
- #209-2001: Miles Davis – The Complete In A Silent Way Sessions
- #210-2001: Bobby Hackett – The Complete Capitol Solo Sessions
- #211-2001: Bix Beiderbecke, Frank Trumbauer, & Jack Teagarden – The Complete Okeh and Brunswick Sessions (1924–1936)
- #212-2002: Stanley Turrentine – The Blue Note Quintet/Sextet Studio Sessions (1961–1969)
- #213-2002: Eddie Lang & Joe Venuti – The Classic Columbia and Okeh Sessions
- #214-2002: Sarah Vaughan – The Complete Roulette Studio Sessions
- #215-2002: Lou Donaldson – The Complete Blue Note Sessions (1957–1960)
- #216-2002: Johnny Smith – The Complete Roost Sessions
- #217-2002: Louis Prima & Wingy Manone – The Complete Brunswick & Vocalion Recordings (1924–1937)
- #218-2003: Jack Teagarden – The Complete Roulette Sessions
- #219-2003: Bunny Berigan – The Complete Brunswick, Parlophone and Vocalion Sessions
- #220-2003: Miles Davis – The Complete Blackhawk Sessions
- #221-2003: Gerry Mulligan – The Complete Verve Concert Band Sessions
- #222-2003: Roy Eldridge – The Complete Verve Studio Sessions
- #223-2003: Woody Herman – The Complete Columbia Recordings His Orchestra & Woodchoppers (1945–1947)
- #224-2004: Tal Farlow – The Complete Verve Sessions
- #225-2004: Art Farmer & Benny Golson – The Complete Argo/Mercury Jazztet Sessions
- #226-2004: Miles Davis – The Complete 1963–1964 Columbia Recordings
- #227-2004: Dinah Washington – The Complete Roulette Sessions
- #228-2005: Columbia Records – Small Group Swing Sessions 1953–1962
- #229-2005: Count Basie – The Complete Clef/Verve Fifties Studio Recordings
- #230-2005: Jazz Crusaders – Pacific Jazz Quintet Studio Session 1961–1970
- #231-2005: Thelonious Monk & John Coltrane – At Carnegie Hall
- #232-2005: Buddy Rich – Argo, Emarcy and Verve Small Group Sessions
- #233-2006: Oliver Nelson – The Verve/Impulse Big Band Sessions (1962–1966)
- #234-2006: Dizzy Gillespie – The Verve/Philips Small Group Sessions 1954–1964
- #235-2006: Duke Ellington – The Complete 1936–1940 Variety, Vocalion and Okeh Small Group Sessions
- #236-2007: Chu Berry – Classic Columbia and Victor Session
- #237-2007: Quincy Jones – The ABC/Mercury Big Band Jazz Sessions 1957–1964
- #238-2007: Lionel Hampton – The Complete Victor Sessions 1937–1941
- #239-2007: The Lester Young Count Basie Sessions 1936–1940
- #240-2008: Benny Goodman – Classic Columbia and Okeh Orchestra Sessions (1939–1958)
- #241-2008: Oscar Peterson – The Complete Clef/Mercury Studio Recordings of the Trio (1951–1953)
- #242-2008: Anthony Braxton – The Complete Arista Recordings (1974–1980)
- #243-2009: Louis Armstrong – The Complete Decca Sessions (1935–1946)
- #244-2009: Artie Shaw – Classic Bluebird and Victor Sessions (1938–1945)
- #245-2009: Bing Crosby – The CBS Radio Recordings (1954–1956)
- #246-2009: Ahmad Jamal – The Complete Trio Argo Sessions (1958–1961)
- #247-2010: Henry Threadgill – Novus & Columbia & Air (1978–1996)
- #248-2010: Duke Ellington – The Complete 1932–1940 Brunswick, Columbia and Master Recordings
- #249-2011: Modern Jazz Quartet – Complete Atlantic Studio Recording 1956–1964
- #250-2011: Jimmie Lunceford – The Complete Decca Session

== Box Sets #251-271 / 2012-2021 ==
- #251-2012: Coleman Hawkins – Classic Session (1922–1947)
- #252-2013: Chick Webb & Ella Fitzgerald – The Complete Decca Sessions (1934–1941)
- #253-2012: Charles Mingus – The Jazz Workshop Concerts 1964–1965
- #254-2012: Earl Hines – Classic Sessions (1928–1945)
- #255-2012: Woody Shaw – The Complete Muse Sessions
- #256-2013: Clifford Jordan – The Complete Strata-East Sessions
- #257-2014: Louis Armstrong – The Complete Columbia and RCA Victor Live Recordings of Louis Armstrong & The All-Stars (1946–1966)
- #258-2014: Rosemary Clooney – The CBS Radio Recordings (1955–1961)
- #259-2014: Eddie Condon & Bud Freeman – Complete Commodore & Decca Sessions (1938–1950)
- #260-2014: Dial Records – The Complete Modern Jazz Sessions (1945–1948)
- #261-2015: Bee Hive Records – The Complete Sessions
- #262-2015: James P. Johnson – Classic Sessions
- #263-2008: Lester Young & Count Basie – Classic Columbia, Okeh and Vocalion: Lester Young with Count Basie (1936–1940)
- #264-2008: Savoy Records – Classic Be-Bop Sessions 1945–49
- #265-2009: Teddy Wilson – Classic Brunswick & Columbia Sessions 1934–1942
- #266-2018: The Savory Collection 1935–1940
- #267-2019: Woody Herman – The Complete Woody Herman Decca, Mars and MGM Sessions (1943–1954)
- #268-2019: Hank Mobley – The Complete Hank Mobley Blue Note Sessions 1963–70
- #269-2020: Paul Desmond – The Complete 1975 Toronto Recordings
- #270-2014: Louis Armstrong – Columbia and RCA Victor Studip Recordings of Louis Armstrong and the All Stars (1947–1958)
- #271-2020: Joe Henderson – The Complete Blue Note Studio Sessions
- #272-2021: Lennie Tristano – Lennie Tristano Personal Recordings 1946–1970
- #273-2022: Classic Black & White Jazz Sessions
- #274-2022: Freddie Hubbard – The Complete Blue Note & Impulse Studio Sessions

== Vinyl Set Series #3001-3008 ==
- #3001: Thelonious Monk – The Complete at the It Club
- #3002: Ella Fitzgerald & Duke Ellington – At the Cote D’Azur
- #3003: Stan Getz – The 1953–54 Norgran Records Studio Sessions
- #3004: Clifford Brown & Max Roach – The EmArcy Records Albums
- #3005: John Coltrane – The Complete Sun Ship Session
- #3006: Roland Kirk – The Limelight/Verve Albums (4 LPs)
- #3007: Louis Armstrong – The All Stars: Newport 1956 & 1958
- #3008: Gerry Mulligan – The Emarcy Records Sextet Recordings

== Mosaic Selects #001-038: Limited Edition 3-CD sets ==
- MS-001: Grachan Moncur
- MS-002: Carmell Jones
- MS-003: Bennie Green
- MS-004: Randy Weston
- MS-005: Paul Chambers
- MS-006: John Patton
- MS-007: Curtis Amy
- MS-008: Duke Pearson
- MS-009: Bob Brookmeyer
- MS-010: Bud Shank/Bob Cooper
- MS-011: Dizzy Reece
- MS-012: Dave Liebman/Richie Beirach
- MS-013: Don Pullen
- MS-014: Dexter Gordon
- MS-015: Art Pepper
- MS-016: Andrew Hill
- MS-017: Johnny Richards
- MS-018: Freddie Slack
- MS-019: Pacific Jazz Piano Trios
- MS-020: Charles Tolliver
- MS-021: Gerry Mulligan
- MS-022: Sidney Bechet
- MS-023: Andrew Hill Solo
- MS-024: Tony Williams
- MS-025: McCoy Tyner
- MS-026: Bobby Hutcherson
- MS-027: Al Cohn, Joe Newman & Freddie Green
- MS-028: Johnny Mercer
- MS-029: Onzy Matthews
- MS-030: Boogie Woogie
- MS-031: Woody Herman
- MS-032: Dave Liebman, Randy Brecker, Richie Beirach, Frank Tusa, Al Foster – Pendulum
- MS-033: Toshiko Akiyoshi – Lew Tabackin Big Band
- MS-034: Denny Zeitlin
- MS-035: John Handy
- MS-036: John Carter & Bobby Bradford
- MS-037: Charles Tolliver Big Band
- MS-038: Sam Rivers Rivbea Orchestra

== Mosaic Singles #1001-1020 ==
- MCD-1001: Duke Ellington – The Cosmic Scene
- MCD-1002: Bud Freeman – Chicago/Austin High School Jazz In Hi-Fi (1957)
- MCD-1003: Al Cohn, Bill Perkins, & Richie Kamuca – The Brothers!
- MCD-1004: J.J. Johnson – J.J.!
- MCD-1005: Art Blakey – Hard Bop!
- MCD-1006: Charles Lloyd – Of Course, Of Course
- MCD-1008: Lee Wiley – West of the Moon
- MCD-1009: Buddy Rich – Rich in London
- MCD-1009: Art Farmer – The Time and the Place: The Lost Concert
- MCD-1011: Jimmy Witherspoon – Goin’ to Kansas City Blues
- MCD-1012: Various – The Jazz Piano
- MCD-1013: Woody Herman – Woody's Winners
- MCD-1014: Duke Ellington – Newport 1958
- MCD-1015: J.J. Johnson & Kai Winding – Trombone for Two
- MCD-1017: Jonah Jones – At the Embers
- MCD-1018: George Wein – IS Alive and Well
- MCD-1019: The Helen Merrill/Dick Katz Sessions
- MCD-1020: Helen Merrill – Casa Forte

== with Dot Time Records ==
  1. 272-2021: Lennie Tristano Personal Recordings 1946 – 1970
