= Al Lucas (musician) =

Canadian double-bassist (1916–1983)

- Born: Windsor, Ontario
- Died: Greenwich, CT
- Genres: Jazz

Albert Bennington Lucas (November 16, 1912 – June 19, 1983) was a Canadian jazz double-bassist.

Lucas took piano lessons as a child from his mother, Francis Bradley Lucas, a concert pianist, eventually switching to bass and tuba at age 12. After moving to New York City in 1933, Lucas played with Kaiser Marshall, then joined the Sunset Royal Serenaders, where he played from 1933 to 1942. During the 1940s, Lucas appeared on record with Hot Lips Page, Coleman Hawkins, Eddie Heywood (1944–45), Duke Ellington (1945), Mary Lou Williams (1946), James P. Johnson, J.J. Johnson, Ben Webster, Erroll Garner, and Eddie South.

He toured and recorded with Illinois Jacquet from 1947 to 1953, recording in Detroit with Jacquet's all-star band which included Sonny Stitt, Leo Parker, Sir Charles Thompson, Maurice Simon and Shadow Wilson before returning to play with Heywood again from 1954 to 1956. He also recorded in the 1950s with Ruby Braff, Charlie Byrd, and Teddy Wilson. He worked primarily as a studio musician in his last two decades, backing up groups at Apollo Theater performances, playing jazz only occasionally. Lucas died in New York City on June 19, 1983.

== Discography ==
=== As sideman ===
With Duke Ellington

- Ellington at Newport (Columbia, 1956)

With Charlie Byrd

- Jazz Recital (Savoy, 1957)

With Bill Doggett

- Everybody Dance the Honky Tonk (King, 1956)
- Doggett Beat for Dancing Feet (King, 1957)

With Dexter Gordon

- Landslide (Blue Note, 1962 [1980])

With Illinois Jacquet

- Groovin' with Jacquet (Clef, 1951-53 [1956])
- The Kid and the Brute (Clef, 1955) with Ben Webster
- The King! (Prestige, 1968)
- The Soul Explosion (Prestige, 1969)

With Oliver Nelson

- Oliver Nelson Plays Michelle (Impulse!, 1966)

With Leo Parker

- Rollin' with Leo (Blue Note, 1961)

With Sonny Stitt

- Now! (Impulse, 1963)

With Teddy Wilson

- The Impeccable Mr. Wilson (Verve, 1956)
- These Tunes Remind Me of You (Verve, 1956 [1959])
