= Pres and Teddy =

Studio album by The Lester Young and Teddy Wilson Quartet
- Released: Early April 1959
- Recorded: January 13, 1956; New York City
- Genre: Jazz
- Length: 42:57
- Labels: Verve; MGV-8205
- Producer: Norman Granz

Lester Young chronology
The Jazz Giants '56 (1956)	Pres and Teddy (1959)	Pres in Europe (1956)

Teddy Wilson chronology
The Creative Teddy Wilson (1955)	Pres and Teddy (1956)	I Got Rhythm (1956)

Pres and Teddy is a jazz album by The Lester Young and Teddy Wilson Quartet, recorded in January 1956. Originally released on LP by Verve in 1959, it has subsequently been reissued on CD by Verve, Universal Japan and Lonehill Jazz.

The album includes six standard swing jazz songs with one original composition, "Pres Returns." In spite of Young's failing health, this studio album is critically acclaimed as one of best of his best later works, and among the best albums produced by Verve Record's founder Norman Granz.

== Background ==
Pres and Teddy is one of several late 1950s reunions between Lester Young, a tenor saxophonist characterized by jazz commentator Scott Yanow as "one of the giants of Jazz history", and Teddy Wilson, "the definitive swing pianist". Recorded on January 13, 1956, the quartet also featured Jo Jones, an innovative and influential jazz drummer, and bassist Gene Ramey. The group had also played together the previous day along with Roy Eldridge, Vic Dickenson and Freddie Green, recording the similarly acclaimed The Jazz Giants '56.

Wilson was in 1956 steadily producing both solo and group albums, having only recently stopped teaching music at Juilliard. Young, although also working steadily, was suffering a rapid deterioration of his health. Though Young had established a strong early presence in jazz prior to being drafted into World War II in 1945, his experiences during the war left him an alcoholic so unapproachable that he invented his own language to better control who would be permitted to communicate with him. But while Young's playing throughout the 50s was often hampered by his excessive drinking, on this occasion, according to Yanow, he returned to "classic form". After these sessions, Young continued to decline, drinking himself to death three years later, at the age of 49.

== Critical reception ==
Professional ratings
Review scores
Source	Rating
Allmusic	5/5 stars
The Penguin Guide to Jazz Recordings	3/4 stars
DownBeat	4.5/5 stars

In 1994, The New York Times listed the album as among 10 of the "high points" of music produced by Norman Granz, who founded the Verve label, describing it as "a magnificent set of standards". While Yanow recommends the comprehensive box set The Complete Lester Young Studio Sessions on Verve for all of Young's later work, he recommends this album along with The Jazz Giants '56 and Lester Young with the Oscar Peterson Trio for more casual listeners seeking Young's best later work.

In his profile of the album for Allmusic, Yanow notes that, "[W]hen he was healthy, Young played at his very best during the '50s, adding an emotional intensity to his sound that had not been present during the more carefree days of the '30s," concluding that on Pres and Teddy Young was in "particularly expressive form".

== Track listing ==
1. "All of Me" (Gerald Marks, Seymour Simons) – 5:10
2. "Prisoner of Love" (Russ Columbo, Clarence Gaskill, Leo Robin) – 7:40
3. "Louise" (Leo Robin, Richard A. Whiting) – 5:18
4. "Love Me or Leave Me" (Walter Donaldson, Gus Kahn) – 6:50
5. "Taking a Chance on Love" (Vernon Duke, Ted Fetter, John Latouche) – 5:10
6. "Love Is Here to Stay" (George Gershwin, Ira Gershwin) – 6:31
7. "Pres Returns" (Lester Young) – 6:18 Bonus track on CD reissue

== Personnel ==
- Teddy Wilson – piano
- Lester Young – tenor saxophone
- Gene Ramey – bass
- Jo Jones – drums

=== Additional personnel ===
CD Reissue

- Dennis Drake – digital remastering
- Donald Elfman – CD Preparation
- Richard Seidel – CD Preparation
- Ellie Hughes – graphic design
- Tom Hughes – design
- Herman Leonard – photography
- Bill Simon – liner notes
