= Maurice Simon =

Maurice Simon may refer to:

- Maurice Simon (official) (1892–1960), Belgian colonial administrator
- Maurice James Simon (1929–2019), American jazz saxophonist
