= The Jazz Giants '56 =

Studio album by Lester Young
- Released: 1956
- Recorded: January 12, 1956; Fine Sound Studios, New York City
- Genre: Jazz
- Length: 42:30
- Labels: Verve; MGN 1056
- Producer: Norman Granz

Lester Young chronology
Pres and Sweets (1955)	The Jazz Giants '56 (1956)	Pres and Teddy (1956)

The Jazz Giants '56 is an album by saxophonist Lester Young, issued in 1956 on Verve Records.

== Track listing ==
1. "I Guess I'll Have To Change My Plan" (Arthur Schwartz, Howard Dietz) - 9:35
2. "I Didn't Know What Time It Was" (Richard Rodgers, Lorenz Hart) - 10:06
3. "Gigantic Blues" (Lester Young) - 6:54
4. "This Year's Kisses" (Irving Berlin) - 6:49
5. "You Can Depend on Me" (Charles Carpenter, Louis Dunlap, Earl Hines) - 9:06

== Personnel ==
- Lester Young – saxophone
- Roy Eldridge – trumpet
- Vic Dickenson – trombone
- Teddy Wilson – piano
- Freddie Green – guitar
- Gene Ramey – bass
- Jo Jones – drums
