= The Main Man =

Studio album by Jo Jones
- Released: 1977
- Recorded: November 29 & 30, 1976
- Studio: RCA Recording Studios, New York City, NY
- Genre: Jazz
- Length: 42:42
- Label: Pablo; 2310 799
- Producer: Norman Granz

Jo Jones chronology
The Drums (1973)	The Main Man (1977)	Our Man, Papa Jo! (1985)

The Main Man is an album by drummer Jo Jones recorded in 1976 and released by the Pablo label the following year.

== Reception ==
Professional ratings
Review scores
Source	Rating
AllMusic	4/5 stars
The Penguin Guide to Jazz Recordings	3/4 stars

AllMusic reviewer Scott Yanow stated "65 at the time and still in fine form, drummer Jo Jones had a rare opportunity to lead his own album for Pablo in 1976 ... The music is very much in the Count Basie groove, with purposeful and concise solos, along with some good spots for the leader.".

== Track listing ==
1. "Goin' to Chicago Blues" (Count Basie, Jimmy Rushing) – 9:06
2. I Want to Be Happy" (Vincent Youmans, Irving Caesar) – 4:48
3. "Ad Lib" (Jo Jones) – 8:12
4. "Dark Eyes" (Traditional) – 10:20
5. "Metrical Portions" (Budd Johnson) – 5:51
6. "Ol' Man River" (Jerome Kern, Oscar Hammerstein II) – 4:25

== Personnel ==
- Jo Jones – drums
- Harry Edison, Roy Eldridge – trumpet
- Vic Dickenson – trombone
- Eddie Davis – tenor saxophone
- Tommy Flanagan – piano
- Freddie Green – guitar
- Sam Jones – bass
- Buck Clayton – arranger (track 4)
