= The Creative Teddy Wilson =

Studio album by Teddy Wilson Trio
- Released: 1955
- Recorded: February 1, 1955; New York City
- Genre: Jazz
- Length: 38:58
- Label: Norgran; MGN 1019
- Producer: Norman Granz

Teddy Wilson chronology
Intimate Listening (1952-53)	The Creative Teddy Wilson (1955)	Pres and Teddy (1956)

For Quiet Lovers cover

The Creative Teddy Wilson (also released as For Quiet Lovers) is a studio album by American jazz pianist Teddy Wilson featuring performances recorded in 1955 for the Norgran label.

== Reception ==
Allmusic awarded the album 3 stars.

Professional ratings
Review scores
Source	Rating
Allmusic	3/5 stars

== Track listing ==
1. "Blues for the Oldest Profession" (Teddy Wilson) - 2:59
2. "It Had to Be You" (Isham Jones, Gus Kahn) - 3:09
3. "You Took Advantage of Me" (Richard Rodgers, Lorenz Hart) - 4:17
4. "Three Little Words" (Harry Ruby, Bert Kalmar) - 2:42
5. "If I Had You" (Jimmy Campbell, Reg Connelly, Ted Shapiro) - 2:34
6. "Who's Sorry Now?" (Ted Snyder, Ruby, Kalmar) - 3:38
7. "The Birth of the Blues" (Buddy DeSylva, Lew Brown, Ray Henderson) - 2:53
8. "When Your Lover Has Gone" (Einar Aaron Swan) - 2:50
9. "Moonlight on the Ganges" (Sherman Myers, Chester Wallace) - 3:50
10. "April in Paris" (Vernon Duke, Yip Harburg) - 3:27
11. "Hallelujah" (Vincent Youmans, Leo Robin, Clifford Grey) - 3:11
12. "Get Out of Town" (Cole Porter) - 3:28

== Personnel ==
- Teddy Wilson - piano
- Milt Hinton – bass
- Jo Jones - drums
