= The Touch of Teddy Wilson =

Studio album by Teddy Wilson
- Released: 1957
- Recorded: August 12, 1957
- Studio: Fine Sound, New York City, NY
- Genre: Jazz
- Length: 38:42
- Label: Verve; MGV 8330
- Producer: Norman Granz

Teddy Wilson chronology
The Teddy Wilson Trio & Gerry Mulligan Quartet with Bob Brookmeyer at Newport (1957)	The Touch of Teddy Wilson (1957)	Mr. Wilson and Mr. Gershwin (1959)

The Touch of Teddy Wilson is an album by American jazz pianist Teddy Wilson featuring performances recorded in 1957 for the Verve label.

== Reception ==
Allmusic awarded the album 3 stars.

Professional ratings
Review scores
Source	Rating
Allmusic	3/5 stars

== Track listing ==
1. "Avalon" (Buddy DeSylva, Al Jolson, Vincent Rose) - 2:34
2. "The Little Things That Mean So Much" (Teddy Wilson, Harold Adamson) - 3:02
3. "'S Wonderful" (George Gershwin, Ira Gershwin) - 3:56
4. "Someone to Watch over Me" (George Gershwin, Ira Gershwin) - 3:58
5. "Jeepers Creepers" (Harry Warren, Johnny Mercer) - 4:07
6. "If You Are But a Dream" (Moe Jaffe, Jack Fulton, Nat Bonx) - 2:45
7. "Bye Bye Blues" (Fred Hamm, Dave Bennett, Bert Lown, Chauncey Gray) - 2:47
8. "Sunny Morning" (Teddy Wilson) - 2:50
9. "Talking to the Moon" (Billy Baskette, George A. Little) - 2:44
10. "Dream House" (Lynne Cowan) - 2:43
11. "Sometimes I'm Happy" (Vincent Youmans, Irving Caesar) - 4:30
12. "That Old Feeling" (Sammy Fain, Lew Brown) - 2:46

== Personnel ==
- Teddy Wilson - piano
- Arvell Shaw – bass
- Roy Burns - drums
