= These Tunes Remind Me of You =

Studio album by Teddy Wilson Trio
- Released: 1959
- Recorded: September 13, 1956; Fine Sound, New York City
- Genre: Jazz
- Length: 39:25
- Label: Verve; MGV 8299
- Producer: Norman Granz

Teddy Wilson chronology
The Impeccable Mr. Wilson (1956)	These Tunes Remind Me of You (1959)	The Teddy Wilson Trio & Gerry Mulligan Quartet with Bob Brookmeyer at Newport (1957)

These Tunes Remind Me of You is an album by American jazz pianist Teddy Wilson featuring performances recorded in 1956 for the Verve label.

== Reception ==
Allmusic awarded the album 3 stars.

Professional ratings
Review scores
Source	Rating
Allmusic	3/5 stars

== Track listing ==
1. "Imagination" (Jimmy Van Heusen, Johnny Burke) - 4:04
2. "The World Is Waiting for the Sunrise" (Ernest Seitz, Eugene Lockhart) - 3:37
3. "I've Got the World on a String" (Harold Arlen, Ted Koehler) - 3:34
4. "Whispering" (Vincent Rose, Richard Coburn, John Schoenberger) - 3:27
5. "Poor Butterfly" (Raymond Hubbell, John Golden) - 3:34
6. "Rosetta" (Earl Hines, Henri Woode) - 4:17
7. "Basin Street Blues" (Spencer Williams) - 5:40
8. "How Deep Is the Ocean?" (Irving Berlin) - 3:54
9. "Just One of Those Things" (Cole Porter) - 4:35
10. "Have You Met Miss Jones?" (Richard Rodgers, Lorenz Hart) - 4:02
11. "It Don't Mean a Thing (If It Ain't Got That Swing)" (Duke Ellington, Irving Mills) - 3:34

== Personnel ==
- Teddy Wilson - piano
- Al Lucas – bass
- Jo Jones - drums
