= Blue Notes =

Blue Notes may refer to:

== Music groups ==
- The Blue Notes, a South African jazz band
- Harold Melvin & the Blue Notes, an American soul and R&B vocal group
- The Bluenotes, a 1950s vocal group from North Carolina
- Bluenotes (Neil Young band), later renamed Ten Men Workin'
- Blue Notes, later Merced Blue Notes, an American rock and roll group formed by Roddy Jackson

== Other uses ==
- Bluenotes, a Canadian apparel retailer
- Blue Notes (album), by Johnny Hodges, 1966
- "Blue Notes", 1972 television series episode of Van der Valk

== See also ==
- Blue note (disambiguation)
