= The Impeccable Mr. Wilson =

Studio album by Teddy Wilson
- Released: 1957
- Recorded: September 13, 1956; Fine Sound, New York City
- Genre: Jazz
- Length: 39:25
- Label: Verve; MGV 8272
- Producer: Norman Granz

Teddy Wilson chronology
I Got Rhythm (1956)	The Impeccable Mr. Wilson (1957)	These Tunes Remind Me of You (1956)

The Impeccable Mr. Wilson is a studio album by American jazz pianist Teddy Wilson featuring performances recorded in 1956 for the Norgran label.

== Reception ==
Allmusic awarded the album 3 stars.

Professional ratings
Review scores
Source	Rating
Allmusic	3/5 stars

== Track listing ==
1. "I Want to Be Happy" (Vincent Youmans, Irving Caesar ) - 3:00
2. "Ain't Misbehavin'" (Fats Waller, Harry Brooks, Andy Razaf) - 3:00
3. "Honeysuckle Rose" (Waller, Razaf) - 3:00
4. "Fine and Dandy" (Kay Swift, Paul James) - 3:34
5. "Sweet Lorraine" (Cliff Burwell, Mitchell Parish) - 3:00
6. "I've Found a New Baby" (Jack Palmer, Spencer Williams) - 3:37
7. "It's the Talk of the Town" (Jerry Livingston, Al J. Neiburg, Marty Symes) - 3:00
8. "Laura" (David Raksin, Johnny Mercer) - 3:33
9. "Undecided" (Sid Robin, Charlie Shavers) - 4:12
10. "Time on My Hands" (Youmans, Harold Adamson, Mack Gordon) - 3:00
11. "Who Cares?" (George Gershwin, Ira Gershwin) - 3:29
12. "Love Is Here to Stay" (Gershwin, Gershwin) - 3:00

== Personnel ==
- Teddy Wilson - piano
- Al Lucas – bass
- Jo Jones - drums
