= The Teddy Wilson Trio & Gerry Mulligan Quartet with Bob Brookmeyer at Newport =

Live album by Teddy Wilson Trio & Gerry Mulligan Quartet
- Released: 1957
- Recorded: July 6, 1957; Newport Jazz Festival, RI
- Genre: Jazz
- Label: Verve; MGV 8235
- Producer: Norman Granz

Teddy Wilson chronology
These Tunes Remind Me of You (1956)	The Teddy Wilson Trio & Gerry Mulligan Quartet with Bob Brookmeyer at Newport (1957)	The Touch of Teddy Wilson (1957)

Gerry Mulligan chronology
Recorded in Boston at Storyville (1956)	The Teddy Wilson Trio & Gerry Mulligan Quartet with Bob Brookmeyer at Newport (1957)	Mulligan Meets Monk (1957)

The Teddy Wilson Trio & Gerry Mulligan Quartet with Bob Brookmeyer at Newport is a live album by Teddy Wilson's Trio and Gerry Mulligan's Quartet recorded at the Newport Jazz Festival in 1957 and released on the Verve label.

== Reception ==
Professional ratings
Review scores
Source	Rating
Allmusic	4.5/5 stars
Disc	3.5/5 stars
Encyclopedia of Popular Music	4/5 stars

Allmusic stated "Although in 1957 some listeners considered swing and cool jazz to be at the extreme poles of the jazz world, this LP, recorded at that year's Newport Jazz Festival, shows just how similar the two idioms were".

== Track listing ==
1. "Stompin' at the Savoy" (Edgar Sampson, Benny Goodman, Chick Webb, Andy Razaf) - 3:40
2. "Airmail Special" (Goodman, Jimmy Mundy, Charlie Christian) - 3:47
3. "Basin Street Blues" (Spencer Williams) - 5:07
4. "I Got Rhythm" (George Gershwin, Ira Gershwin) - 4:20
5. "Sweet Georgia Brown" (Ben Bernie, Maceo Pinkard, Kenneth Casey) - 6:00
6. "My Funny Valentine" (Richard Rodgers, Lorenz Hart) - 4:50
7. "Utter Chaos" (Gerry Mulligan) - 4:35

== Personnel ==
- Teddy Wilson – piano (tracks 1–5)
- Gerry Mulligan – baritone saxophone (tracks 5–7)
- Bob Brookmeyer – valve trombone (tracks 6 & 7)
- Joe Benjamin (tracks 6 & 7), Milt Hinton (tracks 1–5) – bass
- Dave Bailey, (tracks 6 & 7), Specs Powell (tracks 1–5) – drums
