= Jo Jones =

American jazz drummer (1911–1985)

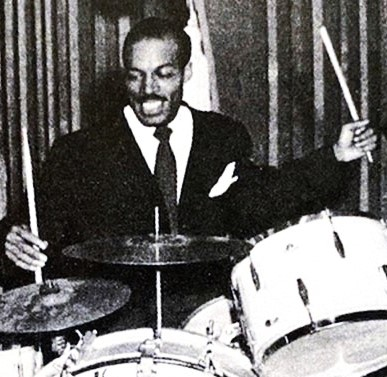
- Jones, c. 1938

Background information
- Also known as: Papa Jo Jones; Kansas City Jo Jones
- Born: Jonathan David Samuel Jones; October 7, 1911; Chicago, Illinois, U.S.
- Died: September 3, 1985 (aged 73) New York City, New York, U.S.
- Genre: Jazz
- Occupation: Musician
- Instrument: Drums
- Years active: 1920s-1985

Jonathan David Samuel Jones (October 7, 1911 – September 3, 1985) was an American jazz drummer. A band leader and pioneer in jazz percussion, Jones anchored the Count Basie Orchestra rhythm section from 1934 to 1948. He was sometimes known as Papa Jo Jones to distinguish him from the younger drummer Philly Joe Jones.

== Biography ==
Born in Chicago, Illinois, United States, Jones moved to Alabama, where he learned to play several instruments, including saxophone, piano, and drums. He worked as a drummer and tap-dancer at carnival shows until joining Walter Page's band, the Blue Devils, in Oklahoma City in the late 1920s. He recorded with the trumpeter Lloyd Hunter's Serenaders in 1931, and later joined the pianist Count Basie's band in 1934. Jones, Basie, the guitarist Freddie Green and the bassist Walter Page were sometimes billed as an "All-American Rhythm section," an ideal team. Jones took a brief break for two years when he was in the military, but he remained with Basie until 1948. He participated in the Jazz at the Philharmonic concert series.

He was one of the first drummers to promote the use of brushes on drums, and shifting the role of timekeeping from the bass drum to the hi-hat cymbal. Jones had a major influence on later drummers such as Buddy Rich, Kenny Clarke, Roy Haynes, Max Roach, and Louie Bellson. He also starred in several films, most notably the musical short Jammin' the Blues (1944).

Jones performed regularly in later years at the West End jazz club at 116th and Broadway in New York City. These performances were generally well attended by other drummers such as Max Roach and Roy Haynes. In addition to his artistry on the drums, Jones was known for his irascible, combative temperament. One famous instance of his irritable temper was in the spring of 1936, during a jam session at the Reno Club in Kansas City. A young Charlie Parker was attempting to play an improvised solo, but lost track of the chord changes; as a sign of contempt, Jones threw a cymbal from his drum kit onto the floor near Parker's feet to get him to leave the stage.

In contrast to the prevailing jazz drum style exemplified by Gene Krupa's loud, insistent pounding of the bass drum on each beat, Jones often omitted bass drum playing altogether. Jones also continued a ride rhythm on hi-hat, while it was continuously opening and closing instead of the common practice of only striking it while it was closed. Jones's style influenced the modern jazz drummer's tendency to play timekeeping rhythms on a cymbal, that is now known as the ride cymbal.

In 1979, Jones was inducted into the Alabama Jazz Hall of Fame for his contribution to the Birmingham, Alabama musical heritage. Jones was the 1985 recipient of an American Jazz Masters fellowship awarded by the National Endowment for the Arts.

His autobiography (as told to Albert Murray), entitled Rifftide: The Life and Opinions of Papa Jo Jones and based on conversations between Jones and novelist Murray from 1977 to before Jones' death in 1985, was posthumously published in 2011 by the University of Minnesota Press.

Known as Papa Jo Jones in his later years, he is sometimes confused with another influential jazz drummer, Philly Joe Jones. The two died only a few days apart.

Jones died of pneumonia in New York City at the age of 73.

== Discography ==
=== As leader/co-leader ===
- 1955: The Jo Jones Special (Vanguard)
- 1957: The Coleman Hawkins, Roy Eldridge, Pete Brown, Jo Jones All Stars at Newport (Verve) with Coleman Hawkins, Roy Eldridge and Pete Brown
- 1958: Jo Jones Plus Two (Vanguard)
- 1959: Jo Jones Trio (Everest)
- 1960: Vamp 'til Ready (Everest)
- 1960: Percussion and Bass (Everest) with Milt Hinton
- 1969-1975: Smiles (Black & Blue)
- 1973: The Drums (Jazz Odyssey)
- 1976: The Main Man (Pablo)
- 1977: Papa Jo and His Friends (Denon)
- 1977: Our Man, Papa Jo! (Denon)

=== As sideman ===
With Count Basie

- Count Basie at Newport (Verve, 1957)
- The Original American Decca Recordings (GRP, 1992) – rec. 1937-1939

With Art Blakey

- Orgy in Rhythm (Blue Note, 1957)
- Drum Suite (Columbia, 1957)

With Milt Buckner

- Midnight Slows, Volume 4 (Black & Blue, 1974)
- Midnight Slows, Volume 5 (Black & Blue, 1974)

With Buck Clayton

- The Huckle-Buck and Robbins' Nest (Columbia, 1954)
- How Hi the Fi (Columbia, 1954)
- Jumpin' at the Woodside (Columbia, 1955)
- All the Cats Join In (Columbia, 1956)

With Coleman Hawkins

- Timeless Jazz (Jazztone, 1954)
- The Hawk Flies High (Riverside, 1957)
- Jazz Reunion with Pee Wee Russell (Candid, 1961)

With Illinois Jacquet

- Swing's the Thing (Clef, 1956)
- The King! (Prestige, 1968)

With Paul Quinichette

- For Basie (Prestige, 1957)
- Basie Reunion (Prestige, 1958)
- Like Basie! (United Artists, 1959)

With Slam Stewart

- Slam Bam (Black And Blue, 1971)
- Slamboree (Black And Blue, 1972)

With Buddy Tate

- Swinging Like Tate (Felsted, 1958)
- Midnight Slows, Volume 4 (Black & Blue, 1974)
- Midnight Slows, Volume 5 (Black & Blue, 1974)

With Ben Webster

- Music for Loving (Norgran, 1954)
- Ben Webster and Associates (Verve, 1959)

With Teddy Wilson

- The Creative Teddy Wilson (Norgran, 1955) - also released as For Quiet Lovers (Verve)
- I Got Rhythm (Verve, 1956)
- The Impeccable Mr. Wilson (Verve, 1956)
- These Tunes Remind Me of You (Verve, 1959) – rec. 1956

With Lester Young

- The Jazz Giants '56 (Verve, 1956)
- Pres and Teddy (Verve, 1956)

With others

- Gene Ammons, All Star Sessions (Prestige, 1956) – rec. 1950-1955
- Mae Barnes, Mae Barnes, Jo Jones, Buck Clayton, Ray Bryant (1958)
- Tony Bennett, The Beat of My Heart (Columbia, 1957)
- Bob Brookmeyer, Whooeeee (Storyville, 1956) - The Zoot Sims-Bob Brookmeyer Quintet
- Ray Bryant, Ray Bryant Trio (Epic, 1956)
- Joe Bushkin, Joe Bushkin, Jo Jones, Buck Clayton (Columbia, 1951)
- Blossom Dearie, Blossom Dearie (Verve, 1957) – rec. 1956
- Roy Eldridge, Dale's Wail (Clef, 1953)
- Duke Ellington & Johnny Hodges, Side by Side (Verve, 1959)
- Ella Fitzgerald, At the Opera House (Verve, 1958)
- Freddie Green, Mr. Rhythm (RCA Victor, 1955)
- Cass Harrison, Wrappin' It Up (MGM, 1957)
- Woody Herman, Songs for Hip Lovers (Verve, 1957)
- Budd Johnson, Blues a la Mode (Felsted, 1958)
- Thad Jones, The Jones Boys (Period, 1957) with Jimmy Jones, Eddie Jones and Quincy Jones
- Helen Merrill, The Nearness of You (EmArcy, 1958)
- Jazz Artists Guild, Newport Rebels (Candid, 1960) with Charles Mingus, Roy Eldridge, Eric Dolphy, and others
- Oscar Peterson, The Oscar Peterson Trio with Sonny Stitt, Roy Eldridge and Jo Jones at Newport (Verve, 1957)
- Leon Redbone, Double Time (Warner Bros., 1977)
- Sonny Stitt, Sonny Stitt Plays Arrangements from the Pen of Quincy Jones (Roost, 1955)
- Dicky Wells, Bones for the King (Felsted, 1958)

== Filmography ==
- Jammin' the Blues (1944)
- The Unsuspected (1947)
- Jazz Icons: Coleman Hawkins-Live in 62 & 64
- L´Aventure du Jazz (1969/72-Louis Panassié)
- Born to Swing (1973)
- The Last of the Blue Devils (1979)

== Bibliography ==
- Jones, Jo (2011). Rifftide: The Life and Opinions of Papa Jo Jones. University of Minnesota Press. ISBN 978-0816673018.
