= Classic Columbia, Okeh and Vocalion: Lester Young with Count Basie (1936–1940) =

Box set by Lester Young
- Released: 2008
- Recorded: November 9, 1936–November 19, 1940
- Genre: Jazz
- Length: 3:59:48
- Label: Mosaic

Classic Columbia, Okeh and Vocalion: Lester Young with Count Basie (1936–1940) is a compilation album featuring recordings of some of 1936–1940 sessions by jazz musicians Lester Young and Count Basie. Released by Mosaic Records in 2008, the box set was limited to 5,000 copies. The compilation was reviewed positively by music critics, with most of them commending the artists and their performances, as well as the technical quality of the record.

== Background ==
In the early 1930s, the saxophonist Lester Young performed with various bands in Kansas City, Missouri, where popular bands of the region were located. There he met the pianist Count Basie, who was leading the Bennie Moten's band. Young briefly joined them before leaving to play with Fletcher Henderson's band. Taunted by the other musicians, he soon left and tried playing with Andy Kirk's band, but he didn't fit in there either and left shortly after. During this period he struggled financially, working with various bands in Kansas City and Minneapolis. After hearing a broadcast of Basie's band, he was dissatisfied with the performance of the band's tenor saxophonist Slim Freeman; he sent a telegraph to Basie, asking to rejoin the band.

== Recording ==
The compilation includes 83 recordings from 19 sessions: a 1936 session and 18 sessions from 1939 and 1940. The sessions were recorded on labels Columbia, Okeh and Vocalion; 1937–1940 sessions on other labels, such as Decca's sessions, are not included on the album.

In 1936, Basie was contacted by the popular jazz critic and producer John Hammond who wanted to work with them. They planned a Christmas performance in New York City. On the way there, they stopped in Chicago, where on November 9, 1936, they had a session. To avoid conflict with Basie's label, Decca Records, the session was performed under the name Jones-Smith Incorporated, after the band's trumpeter Carl Smith and the drummer Jo Jones. According to the jazz historian Loren Schoenberg, this session was unique due to Young's "reinvention of the tenor saxophone" along with it being "the first recorded examples of a new vocabulary for jazz".

The second session included in the compilation is from February 13, 1939, under the name Basie's Bad Boys. It was not released at the time due to technical issues with the studio and low quality of the recording. Other 1939 sessions included are from March 19, March 20, April 5, May 19, June 24, June 26, August 4, September 5, November 6, and November 7. The September 5 session is performed by Kansas City Seven, a band assembled by Count Basie, and is the only recording of the band that includes Lester Young.

The 1940 sessions included are from March 19, March 20, May 31, August 8, October 28, October 30 and November 19. The October 28 session, recorded as Benny Goodman Septet, is the last small group session Young recorded prior to him leaving Basie's band and it was first released in the 1970s, after Young's death.

== Release ==
Lester Young with Count Basie (1936–1940) was released in 2008 by Mosaic Records. The box set contained four compact discs and a 32-page booklet, written by the jazz historian Loren Schoenberg, with detailed information about the session and their songs presented on the album. The box set was limited to 5,000 copies.

== Critical reception ==
Professional ratings
Review scores
Source	Rating
AllMusic	4/5 stars
The Buffalo News	4/4 stars

Lester Young with Count Basie (1936–1940) was reviewed positively by music critics. Theodore "arwulf arwulf" Grenier, in his review for AllMusic, called the compilation "at once thorough and incomplete, its layout both meticulous and perhaps unevenly constructed". He criticized it for having too many alternative takes, believing that they could have been replaced with other master recordings from these sessions. Ben Ratliff of The New York Times commended Young's "subtle and unusual harmony" and the audio quality of the record. Fanfare's Michael Ullman praised the album. Highlighting "Ad Lib Blues", he wrote: "Swing, the blues, and I'd perhaps say even music, doesn’t get any better than this". Colin Fleming, in a review for The New Yorker, believed the compilation presents Lester Young "at his apex", adding that his tone was a "kind of high-Romantic art". The journalist also complimented the audio quality, saying that "music [was] at last revealed as clean and crisp". Stuart Kremsky of IAJRC Journal called the compilation a "treasure-trove of masterpieces". Saying that it is "utterly indispensable", he praised both the performances of the musicians and the technical quality of the record. Chicago Tribune's Howard Reich found Young's performance to be "tonally charismatic and rhythmically ebullient". Jeff Simon of The Buffalo News wrote that the compilation includes "[s]ome of the most enduring and irresistible masterworks of the entire swing era".

== Track listing ==
Disc 1
No.	Title	Performer	Length
1.	"Shoe Shine Boy"	Jones-Smith Incorporated	2:57
2.	"Evenin'"	Jones-Smith Incorporated	2:54
3.	"Boogie Woogie"	Jones-Smith Incorporated	3:12
4.	"Oh, Lady Be Good"	Jones-Smith Incorporated	3:05
5.	"I Ain't Got Nobody"	Basie's Bad Boys	2:55
6.	"Goin' To Chicago"	Basie's Bad Boys	3:06
7.	"Live and Love Tonight"	Basie's Bad Boys	3:07
8.	"Love Me Or Leave Me"	Basie's Bad Boys	2:31
9.	"What Goes Up Must Come Down"	Count Basie And His Orchestra	2:47
10.	"Taxi War Dance"	Count Basie And His Orchestra	2:48
11.	"Don't Worry 'Bout Me"	Count Basie And His Orchestra	2:44
12.	"And The Angels Sing"	Count Basie And His Orchestra	3:03
13.	"If I Didn't Care"	Count Basie And His Orchestra	2:46
14.	"Twelfth Street Rag"	Count Basie And His Orchestra	3:02
15.	"Miss Thing (Pt. 1)"	Count Basie And His Orchestra	2:53
16.	"Miss Thing (Pt. 2)"	Count Basie And His Orchestra	2:42
17.	"Shoe Shine Boy" (alternative take)	Jones-Smith Incorporated	2:47
18.	"What Goes Up Must Come Down" (alternative take)	Count Basie And His Orchestra	2:47
19.	"Taxi War Dance" (alternative take)	Count Basie And His Orchestra	2:48
20.	"Don't Worry 'Bout Me" (alternative take)	Count Basie And His Orchestra	2:47

Disc 2
No.	Title	Performer	Length
1.	"Lonesome Miss Pretty"	Count Basie And His Orchestra	2:54
2.	"Bolero At The Savoy"	Count Basie And His Orchestra	2:57
3.	"Pound Cake"	Count Basie And His Orchestra	2:43
4.	"You Can Count On Me"	Count Basie And His Orchestra	2:56
5.	"Song Of The Islands"	Count Basie And His Orchestra	3:01
6.	"Clap Hands, Here Comes Charlie"	Count Basie And His Orchestra	2:28
7.	"Dickie's Dream"	Count Basie Kansas City Seven	3:08
8.	"Lester Leaps In"	Count Basie Kansas City Seven	3:12
9.	"The Apple Jump"	Count Basie And His Orchestra	2:55
10.	"I Left My Baby"	Count Basie And His Orchestra	3:10
11.	"Riff Interlude"	Count Basie And His Orchestra	3:03
12.	"You Can Count On Me" (alternative take)	Count Basie And His Orchestra	2:51
13.	"Dickie's Dream" (breakdown 2)	Count Basie Kansas City Seven	3:18
14.	"Dickie's Dream" (alternative take 3)	Count Basie Kansas City Seven	2:44
15.	"Lester Leaps In" (alternative take)	Count Basie Kansas City Seven	3:10
16.	"I Left My Baby" (alternative take 2 and breakdown 6)	Count Basie And His Orchestra	4:09
17.	"Riff Interlude" (alternative take)	Count Basie And His Orchestra	3:11
18.	"Riff Interlude" (alternative take 2)	Count Basie And His Orchestra	3:07
19.	"Riff Interlude" (breakdown 3)	Count Basie And His Orchestra	1:33
20.	"Riff Interlude" (alternative take 4)	Count Basie And His Orchestra	3:03

Disc 3
No.	Title	Performer	Length
1.	"Between The Devil And The Deep Blue Sea"	Count Basie And His Orchestra	2:32
2.	"Ham 'N' Eggs"	Count Basie And His Orchestra	2:30
3.	"Hollywood Jump"	Count Basie And His Orchestra	2:34
4.	"I Never Knew"	Count Basie And His Orchestra	2:39
5.	"Tickle-Toe"	Count Basie And His Orchestra	2:36
6.	"Let's Make Hay While The Moon Shines"	Count Basie And His Orchestra	2:50
7.	"Louisiana"	Count Basie And His Orchestra	2:24
8.	"Easy Does It"	Count Basie And His Orchestra	3:26
9.	"Let Me See"	Count Basie And His Orchestra	2:45
10.	"Blow Top"	Count Basie And His Orchestra	2:54
11.	"Between The Devil And The Deep Blue Sea" (breakdown 1 and breakdown 2)	Count Basie And His Orchestra	2:40
12.	"Between The Devil And The Deep Blue Sea" (alternative take 3)	Count Basie And His Orchestra	2:39
13.	"Between The Devil And The Deep Blue Sea" (alternative take 5)	Count Basie And His Orchestra	2:32
14.	"Ham 'N' Eggs" (breakdown 5)	Count Basie And His Orchestra	1:35
15.	"Ham 'N' Eggs" (alternative take 6)	Count Basie And His Orchestra	2:27
16.	"Hollywood Jump" (alternative take)	Count Basie And His Orchestra	2:35
17.	"Let's Make Hay While The Moon Shines" (alternative take)	Count Basie And His Orchestra	2:36
18.	"Louisiana" (alternative take)	Count Basie And His Orchestra	2:24
19.	"Let Me See" (alternative take)	Count Basie And His Orchestra	2:42
20.	"Blow Top" (alternative take)	Count Basie And His Orchestra	2:52

Disc 4
No.	Title	Performer	Length
1.	"Evenin'"	Count Basie And His Orchestra	2:40
2.	"The World Is Mad (Pt. 1)"	Count Basie And His Orchestra	2:37
3.	"The World Is Mad (Pt. 2)"	Count Basie And His Orchestra	2:48
4.	"Ad Lib Blues" (improvisation)	Benny Goodman Septet	3:19
5.	"Wholly Cats"	Benny Goodman Septet	3:14
6.	"Charlie's Dream"	Benny Goodman Septet	3:11
7.	"I Never Knew"	Benny Goodman Septet	2:58
8.	"Lester's Dream"	Benny Goodman Septet	3:15
9.	"What's Your Number?"	Count Basie And His Orchestra	2:50
10.	"Five O'Clock Whistle"	Count Basie And His Orchestra	3:03
11.	"Broadway"	Count Basie And His Orchestra	2:59
12.	"China Boy"	Glenn Hardman And His Hammond Five	2:49
13.	"Exactly Like You"	Glenn Hardman And His Hammond Five	2:40
14.	"On The Sunny Side Of The Street"	Glenn Hardman And His Hammond Five	3:53
15.	"Upright Organ Blues"	Glenn Hardman And His Hammond Five	2:57
16.	"Who?"	Glenn Hardman And His Hammond Five	2:34
17.	"Jazz Me Blues"	Glenn Hardman And His Hammond Five	2:44
18.	"Exactly Like You" (alternative take)	Glenn Hardman And His Hammond Five	2:46
19.	"What's Your Number?" (alternative take 3)	Count Basie And His Orchestra	2:55
20.	"What's Your Number?" (alternative take 2)	Count Basie And His Orchestra	2:37
21.	"Five O'Clock Whistle" (alternative take 2)	Count Basie And His Orchestra	2:05
22.	"Five O'Clock Whistle" (breakdown)	Count Basie And His Orchestra	3:03
23.	"Broadway" (alternative take)	Count Basie And His Orchestra	3:26
