= Lester Young with the Oscar Peterson Trio =

Compilation album by Lester Young
- Released: June 1954 (MGN 5-6); August 1954 (MGN 1005)
- Recorded: November 28, 1952; New York City
- Genre: Jazz
- Length: 63:37
- Labels: Nogran; MGN 5/6/1054; Verve (reissue)
- Producer: Norman Granz

Lester Young chronology
Pres and Teddy and Oscar (1952)	Lester Young with the Oscar Peterson Trio (1954)	Pres and Sweets (1955)

Oscar Peterson chronology
Oscar Peterson Plays Cole Porter (1953)	Lester Young with the Oscar Peterson Trio (1954)	Lionel Hampton Plays Love Songs (1954)

Verve reissue cover

Lester Young with the Oscar Peterson Trio is a 1954 studio album by American jazz saxophonist Lester Young, accompanied by Oscar Peterson's working trio of the time (featuring Ray Brown and Barney Kessel), plus drummer J. C. Heard. The music on this album was originally released as three separate albums: Lester Young with the Oscar Peterson Trio #1 and Lester Young with the Oscar Peterson Trio #2, both released in June 1954 (MGN 5 & 6), and The President (August 1954, MGN 1005). It was collated for this 1997 reissue by Verve Records.

== Reception ==
Professional ratings
Review scores
Source	Rating
AllMusic	5/5 stars
The Penguin Guide to Jazz Recordings	3.5/4 stars

C. Michael Bailey of All About Jazz wrote, "All of Young's performances are transplanted from a different era. [...] The harmonic advances of be-bop had already been introduced and assimilated into the jazz vernacular by this time. Yet Young, while adopting (or pioneering) some be-bop practices, remains a melodic, horizontal performer, in sharp contrast to the harmonic, vertical performers of classic be-bop. [...] Young's playing is wispy, understated, and very, very clever. [...] The Oscar Peterson Trio provides a hand in glove accompaniment for Young on these recordings."

Scott Yanow for AllMusic, "Prez performs definitive versions of "Just You, Just Me" and "Tea for Two," and plays a string of concise but memorable ballad renditions [...] This is essential music from a jazz legend."

== Track listing ==
No.	Title	Music	Length
1.	"Ad Lib Blues"	Oscar Peterson; Lester Young	5:54
2.	"I Can't Get Started"	Vernon Duke; Ira Gershwin	3:41
3.	"Just You, Just Me"	Jesse Greer; Raymond Klages	7:40
4.	"Almost Like Being in Love"	Frederick Loewe; Alan Jay Lerner	3:34
5.	"Tea for Two"	Vincent Youmans; Irving Caesar	7:45
6.	"There Will Never Be Another You"	Harry Warren; Mack Gordon	3:28
7.	"(Back Home Again In) Indiana"	James F. Hanley; Ballard MacDonald	7:04
8.	"On the Sunny Side of the Street"	Jimmy McHugh; Dorothy Fields	3:27
9.	"Stardust"	Hoagy Carmichael; Mitchell Parish	3:35
10.	"(I'm) Confessin' (That I Love You)"	Doc Daugherty; Ellis Reynolds; Al J. Neiburg	3:41
11.	"I Can't Give You Anything but Love"	McHugh; Fields	3:22
12.	"These Foolish Things"	Jack Strachey; Holt Marvell; Harry Link	3:27
13.	"'(It Takes) Two to Tango': Rehearsal, False Start and Chatter" (Bonus track on CD reissue)	Al Hoffman; Dick Manning	6:06
14.	"I Can't Get Started" (Bonus track on CD reissue)	Duke; Gershwin	0:53
Total length:			63:37

== Personnel ==
Musicians

- Lester Young – tenor saxophone, vocals on "(It Takes) Two to Tango"
- Oscar Peterson – piano
- Barney Kessel – guitar
- Ray Brown – double bass
- J. C. Heard – drums

Technical

- Norman Granz – producer
- Nat Hentoff – liner notes
