= I Got Rhythm (album) =

Studio album by Teddy Wilson
- Released: 1956
- Recorded: March 5, 1956; Universal Recording, Chicago, IL
- Genre: Jazz
- Length: 43:34
- Label: Verve; MGV 2073
- Producer: Norman Granz

Teddy Wilson chronology
Pres and Teddy (1956)	I Got Rhythm (1956)	The Impeccable Mr. Wilson (1956)

I Got Rhythm is a studio album by American jazz pianist Teddy Wilson featuring performances recorded in 1956 for the Verve label.

Professional ratings
Review scores
Source	Rating
Allmusic	4.5/5 stars
DownBeat	4/5 stars

== Track listing ==
1. "Stompin' at the Savoy" (Edgar Sampson, Benny Goodman, Andy Razaf, Chick Webb) - 4:12
2. "Say It Isn't So" (Irving Berlin) - 2:44
3. "All of Me" (Gerald Marks, Seymour Simons) - 3:00
4. "Stars Fell on Alabama" (Frank Perkins\. Mitchell Parish) - 3:08
5. "I Got Rhythm" (George Gershwin, Ira Gershwin) - 3:37
6. "On the Sunny Side of the Street" (Jimmy McHugh, Dorothy Fields) - 3:20
7. "Sweet Georgia Brown" (Ben Bernie, Maceo Pinkard, Kenneth Casey) - 2:45
8. "As Time Goes By" (Herman Hupfeld) - 3:10
9. "Smiles" ( J. Will Callahan, Lee Roberts) - 3:27
10. "When Your Lover Has Gone" (Einar Aaron Swan) - 3:15
11. "Limehouse Blues" (Philip Braham, Douglas Furber) - 4:07
12. "Blues for Daryl" (Teddy Wilson) - 3:34
13. "You're Driving Me Crazy" (Walter Donaldson) - 3:15

== Personnel ==
- Teddy Wilson - piano
- Gene Ramey – bass
- Jo Jones - drums
