= Eiji Kitamura =

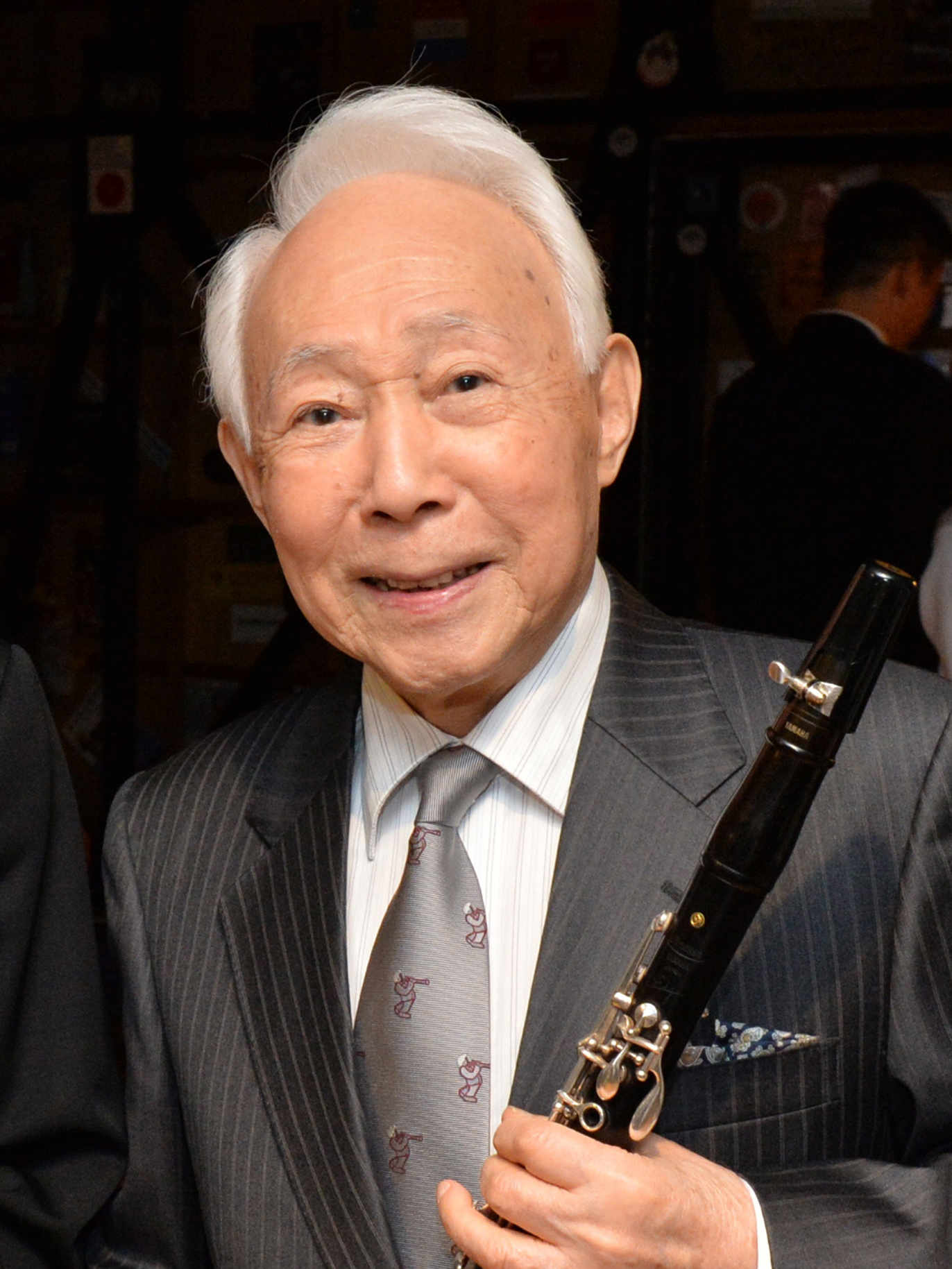
- Kitamura in 2018

Background information
- Born: Kiramura Eiji (北村英治); April, 8th 1929 (age 96); Tokyo, Japan
- Genres: Jazz; Japanese jazz
- Occupation: Musician - Composer
- Instrument: Clarinet - Tenor saxophone
- Years active: 1951-present
- Website: eijikitamura.com/profile.html

Eiji Kitamura (Japanese: 北村 英治; born April 8, 1929) is a Japanese jazz clarinetist and tenor saxophonist originally from Tokyo who made his debut at the age of 22.

Kitamura devoted himself to clarinet playing while still an undergraduate at Keio University in Tokyo. He first came to prominence in the U.S. at the 20th Anniversary Jam Session of the Monterey Jazz Festival in 1977. His following in Japan was built previous to this on his regular television program.

He prefers to interpret traditional swing jazz rather than modern jazz, and according to Allmusic is most strongly influenced by Benny Goodman and Woody Herman.

== Discography ==
- Teddy Wilson Meets Eiji Kitamura (Trio, 1973)
- Swing Sessions (RCA, 1978)
- Swing Eiji (Concord Jazz, 1981)
- Seven Stars (Concord Jazz, 1982)
- ハッピー・クッキング (Happy Cooking) (1986)

== See also ==
- Yoshiaki Miyanoue
