= Maurice James Simon =

- Born: March 26, 1929; Houston, Texas, U.S.
- Died: August 6, 2019 (aged 90)
- Genres: Jazz
- Instruments: Saxophone

Maurice James Simon (March 26, 1929 – August 6, 2019) was an American jazz saxophonist.

== Life and career ==
A high school classmate of Eric Dolphy, Simon appeared on an early-1945 Los Angeles recording in a band led by Russell Jacquet and which also included Teddy Edwards, Charles Mingus, Bill Davis and Chico Hamilton.

In 1948, Simon was in an all-star band recording in Detroit, which included Sonny Stitt, Leo Parker, Sir Charles Thompson, Al Lucas and Shadow Wilson. He went on to join the Gerald Wilson Orchestra which also included Snooky Young, Red Kelly and Melba Liston.

In 1950, he recorded for Savoy Records backing Helen Humes in a big band with Dexter Gordon, Ernie Freeman, Red Callender and J.C. Heard. In the 1970s, he was a member of the Duke Ellington Orchestra.

Simon also played with Fats Domino, Papa John Creach, Big Maybelle, Faye Adams, Bumble Bee Slim, Percy Mayfield and B. B. King.

Simon died on August 6, 2019, at the age of 90.

== Discography ==
=== As sideman ===
- 1956: Singin' the Blues (Crown)
