= Commodore Records =

American independent record label

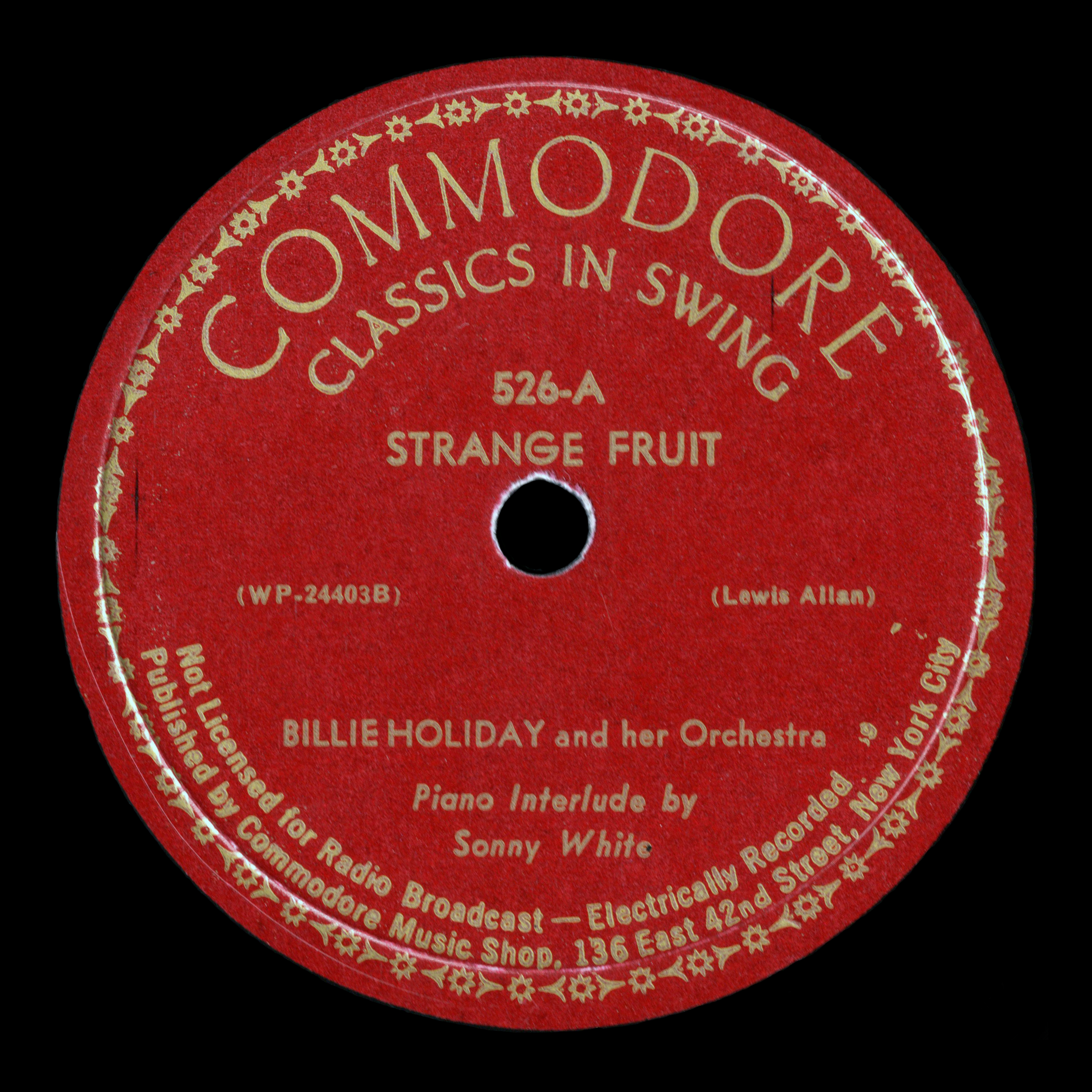
- Commodore Records label for Billie Holiday's "Strange Fruit" (1939)
- Founded: 1938
- Founder: Milt Gabler
- Defunct: 1954
- Status: Inactive
- Genre: Jazz
- Country of origin: U.S.
- Location: New York City

Commodore Records was an American independent record label known for producing Dixieland jazz and swing. It is also remembered for releasing Billie Holiday's hit "Strange Fruit".

== History ==
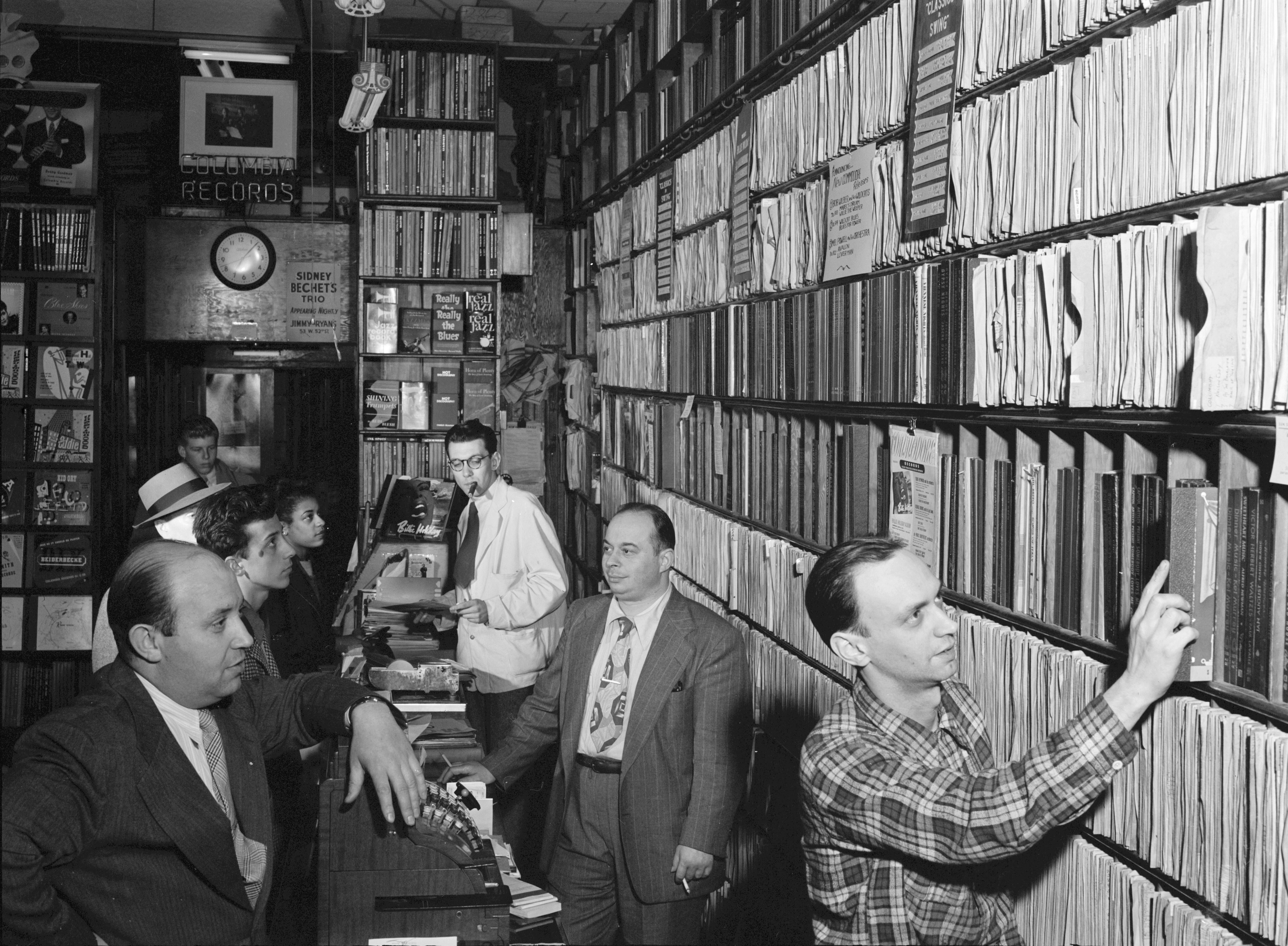
Milt Gabler, Herbie Hill, Lou Blum and Jack Crystal at the Commodore Music Shop, New York City (1947)

Commodore Records was founded in the spring of 1938 by Milt Gabler, a native of Harlem who founded the Commodore Music Shop in 1926 in Manhattan at 136 East 42nd Street (diagonally across the street from the Commodore Hotel), and from 1938–1941 with a branch at 46 West 52nd Street,

Commodore's albums included dixieland music (Eddie Condon, Wild Bill Davison) and swing (Coleman Hawkins, Earl Hines). Commodore's biggest hit was "Strange Fruit" (backed with "Fine and Mellow") by Billie Holiday, which reached No. 16 on the charts on July 22, 1939. The label was most active from 1939 to 1946. The roster included Bud Freeman, Bobby Hackett, Edmond Hall, Hot Lips Page, Pee Wee Russell, Willie "The Lion" Smith, Muggsy Spanier, Art Tatum, Fats Waller, Lee Wiley, and Lester Young.

Gabler arranged for recording and pressing to be done by the American Record Corporation (ARC), then Reeves Transcription Services and Decca. In the early 1960s, a series of Commodore albums was compiled by Gabler and released by Mainstream. In the late 1980s, Mosaic issued Commodore's complete recordings in three box-sets (LP).

Billy Crystal, Gabler's nephew, compiled an album of songs dedicated to his uncle titled Billy Crystal Presents: The Milt Gabler Story.

== See also ==
- List of record labels
