= Our Man, Papa Jo! =

Studio album by Jo Jones
- Released: 1978
- Recorded: December 12, 1977
- Studio: Sound Ideas Studio, New York City, NY
- Genre: Jazz
- Length: 42:42
- Label: Denon; YX-7527-ND
- Producer: Yoshio Ozawa

Jo Jones chronology
| Papa Jo and His Friends (1978) | Our Man, Papa Jo! (1978) |

Our Man, Papa Jo! is the last studio album recorded by drummer Jo Jones in 1977 and released by the Japanese Denon label the following year.

== Reception ==
Professional ratings
Review scores
| Source | Rating |
|---|---|
| AllMusic | 4/5 stars |

AllMusic reviewer Scott Yanow stated "The final session for a jazz legend. Drummer Jo Jones was nearing the end when he got together with his old friends ... He still managed to play with some degree of authority and anchor the rhythm section".

== Track listing ==
1. "Take the "A" Train" (Billy Strayhorn) – 5:42
2. "My Last Affair" (Haven Johnson) – 5:50
3. "Stompin' at the Savoy" (Edgar Sampson, Benny Goodman, Chick Webb, Andy Razaf) – 7:09
4. "Broadway" (Wilbur H Bird, Teddy McRae, Henri Woode) – 6:17
5. "As Time Goes By" (Herman Hupfeld) – 2:58
6. "Wrap Your Troubles in Dreams" (Harry Barris, Ted Koehler, Billy Moll) – 3:27
7. "Solitude" (Duke Ellington, Eddie DeLange) – 4:25
8. "It Don't Mean a Thing" (Ellington) – 4:38

== Personnel ==
- Jo Jones – drums
- Jimmy Oliver – tenor saxophone
- Hank Jones – piano
- Major Holley – bass
