= The Complete Blue Note Recordings of Thelonious Monk =

The Complete Blue Note Recordings

Box set by Thelonious Monk
- Released: 1983 (vinyl); 1994 (CD)
- Recorded: 1947–1952
- Genre: Jazz
- Label: Mosaic (vinyl); Blue Note (CD)

The Complete Blue Note Recordings of Thelonious Monk is a box set by American jazz pianist Thelonious Monk compiling his recordings for Blue Note first released as a limited four-LP box set on Mosaic Records in 1983 before being issued as a four-CD box set by Blue Note for the first time in 1994 as The Complete Blue Note Recordings.

== Background ==
=== Recording and production ===
Monk recorded six sessions for Blue Note, all produced by Alfred Lion: October 15 and 24, 1947, November 21, 1947, July 2, 1948, July 23, 1951, and May 30, 1952. All sessions were recorded by Doug Hawkins at WOR Studios, except July 2, 1948, recorded at APEX studios. He also appeared as a sideman on two tracks for Sonny Rollins, Vol. 2 (1957). Two Thelonious Monk Quartet concerts, featuring John Coltrane and backed by a rhythm section of bassist Ahmed Abdul-Malik and drummers Shadow Wilson or Roy Haynes, have also been released on Blue Note: one recorded on November 29, 1957 at Carnegie Hall (with Shadow Wilson), the other on September 11, 1958 at the Five Spot Café (with Roy Haynes).

=== Release history ===
Two 10-inch long playing records were cut from the first five sessions: Genius of Modern Music (1951) and Genius of Modern Music, Vol. 2 (1952), with cuts from the fourth going to Milt Jackson: Wizard of the Vibes.

After 10-inch LPs lost the format war, Blue Note began reissuing its Modern Jazz Series on 12"s. Material from the two ten-inches, the 1952 session, and other outtakes were recompiled on Genius of Modern Music, Vol. One (BLP 1510) and Genius of Modern Music, Vol. Two (BLP 1511).

The complete studio recordings were released for the first time on the Mosaic release in 1983. In 1989, Blue Note reissued the studio recordings on CD as Genius of Modern Music, Vols. One & Two, minus the 1948 Milt Jackson session (concurrently reissued in its entirety on Milt Jackson: Wizard of the Vibes) and the two 1957 Sonny Rollins tracks. In 1993, Blue Note released the September 11, 1958 recording as Discovery! Live at the Five Spot. The following year Blue Note issued the box set The Complete Blue Note Recordings on CD, compiling the six sessions and two Rollins tracks on the first three discs, and Five Spot concert on the fourth. The Carnegie performance, still sitting preserved at the Library of Congress, wouldn't be discovered and released until September 27, 2005.

== Reception ==
Professional ratings
Review scores
Source	Rating
AllMusic	5/5 stars
Penguin Guide to Jazz	👑

AllMusic's Scott Yanow said:

This magnificent limited-edition set launched the Mosaic label in real style.... Since these were Monk's first opportunities to lead his own recording dates, this set includes the original versions of such classics as "Ruby, My Dear," "Well You Needn't," "Off Minor," "In Walked Bud," "Evidence," "Criss Cross" and "Straight No Chaser" along with Monk's first chance to record "'Round Midnight" and "Epistrophy." The sidemen include such notables as trumpeters Kenny Dorham and Idrees Sulieman, drummers Art Blakey and Max Roach, vibraphonist Milt Jackson, altoist Lou Donaldson and tenor-saxophonist Lucky Thompson, but it is the unique pianist/composer who is the main star. Many of these recordings (generally the master takes) has been reissued in other forms by Blue Note.

== Track listing ==
=== The Complete Blue Note Recordings of Thelonious Monk – Mosaic Records, MR4-101 ===
All tracks are written by Thelonious Monk, except as noted.

Side I
No.	Title	Date recorded	Length
1.	"Humph"	October 15, 1947	2:50
2.	"Evonce" (alternate take)	October 15, 1947	3:00
3.	"Evonce"	October 15, 1947	3:01
4.	"Suburban Eyes"	October 15, 1947	2:58
5.	"Suburban Eyes" (alternate take)	October 15, 1947	2:55
6.	"Thelonious"	October 15, 1947	2:58
7.	"Nice Work If You Can Get It" (alternate take)	October 24, 1947	3:01

Side II
No.	Title	Date recorded	Length
1.	"Nice Work If You Can Get It"	October 24, 1947	3:00
2.	"Ruby My Dear" (alternate take)	October 24, 1947	3:03
3.	"Ruby My Dear"	October 24, 1947	3:05
4.	"Well You Needn't"	October 24, 1947	2:55
5.	"Well You Needn't" (alternate take)	October 24, 1947	2:52
6.	"April in Paris" (alternate take)	October 24, 1947	2:39
7.	"April in Paris"	October 24, 1947	3:17

Side III
No.	Title	Date recorded	Length
1.	"Off Minor"	October 24, 1947	2:58
2.	"Introspection"	October 24, 1947	3:10
3.	"In Walked Bud"	November 21, 1947	2:54
4.	"Monk's Mood"	November 21, 1947	3:05
5.	"Who Knows"	November 21, 1947	2:40
6.	"'Round Midnight"	November 21, 1947	3:09
7.	"Who Knows" (alternate take)	November 21, 1947	2:39

Side IV
No.	Title	Writer(s)	Date recorded	Length
1.	"All the Things You Are"	Jerome Kern; Oscar Hammerstein II	July 2, 1948	2:57
2.	"I Should Care" (alternate take)	Axel Stordahl; Paul Weston; Sammy Cahn	July 2, 1948	3:00
3.	"I Should Care"	Stordahl; Weston; Cahn	July 2, 1948	2:59
4.	"Evidence"		July 2, 1948	2:31
5.	"Misterioso"		July 2, 1948	3:19
6.	"Misterioso" (alternate take)		July 2, 1948	2:43
7.	"Epistrophy"	Monk; Kenny Clarke	July 2, 1948	3:05
8.	"I Mean You"		July 2, 1948	2:44

Side V
No.	Title	Writer(s)	Date recorded	Length
1.	"Four in One"		July 23, 1951	3:27
2.	"Four in One" (alternate take)		July 23, 1951	3:26
3.	"Criss Cross"		July 23, 1951	2:55
4.	"Criss Cross" (alternate take)		July 23, 1951	2:48
5.	"Eronel"	Monk; Sulieman; Sadik Hakim	July 23, 1951	3:01
6.	"Straight, No Chaser"		July 23, 1951	2:54

Side VI
No.	Title	Writer(s)	Date recorded	Length
1.	"Ask Me Now" (alternate take)		July 23, 1951	4:26
2.	"Ask Me Now"		July 23, 1951	3:12
3.	"Willow Weep for Me"	Ann Ronell	July 23, 1951	3:00
4.	"Skippy"		May 30, 1952	2:59
5.	"Skippy" (alternate take)		May 30, 1952	3:07
6.	"Hornin' In" (alternate take)		May 30, 1952	3:06

Sive VII
No.	Title	Writer(s)	Date recorded	Length
1.	"Hornin' In"		May 30, 1952	3:12
2.	"Sixteen" (first take)		May 30, 1952	3:28
3.	"Sixteen" (second take)		May 30, 1952	3:37
4.	"Carolina Moon"	Davis, Burke	May 30, 1952	3:26
5.	"Let's Cool One"		May 30, 1952	3:45
6.	"I'll Follow You"	Roy Turk; Fred E. Ahlert	May 30, 1952	3:46

Side VIII
No.	Title	Date recorded	Length
1.	"Reflections"	April 14, 1957	7:01
2.	"Misterioso"	April 14, 1957	9:22

=== The Complete Blue Note Recordings – Blue Note ===
All tracks are written by Thelonious Monk.

Disc one
No.	Title	Date recorded	Length
1.	"Humph"	October 15, 1947	2:50
2.	"Evonce" (alternate take)	October 15, 1947	3:00
3.	"Evonce"	October 15, 1947	3:01
4.	"Suburban Eyes"	October 15, 1947	2:58
5.	"Suburban Eyes" (alternate take)	October 15, 1947	2:55
6.	"Thelonious"	October 15, 1947	2:58
7.	"Nice Work If You Can Get It" (alternate take)	October 24, 1947	3:01
8.	"Nice Work If You Can Get It"	October 24, 1947	3:00
9.	"Ruby My Dear" (alternate take)	October 24, 1947	3:03
10.	"Ruby My Dear"	October 24, 1947	3:05
11.	"Well You Needn't"	October 24, 1947	2:55
12.	"Well You Needn't" (alternate take)	October 24, 1947	2:52
13.	"April in Paris" (alternate take)	October 24, 1947	2:39
14.	"April in Paris"	October 24, 1947	3:17
15.	"Off Minor"	October 24, 1947	2:58
16.	"Introspection"	October 24, 1947	3:10
17.	"In Walked Bud"	November 21, 1947	2:54
18.	"Monk's Mood"	November 21, 1947	3:05
19.	"Who Knows"	November 21, 1947	2:40
20.	"'Round Midnight"	November 21, 1947	3:09
21.	"Who Knows" (alternate take)	November 21, 1947	2:39

Disc 2
No.	Title	Writer(s)	Date recorded	Length
1.	"All the Things You Are"	Jerome Kern; Oscar Hammerstein II	July 2, 1948	2:57
2.	"I Should Care" (alternate take)	Axel Stordahl; Paul Weston; Sammy Cahn	July 2, 1948	3:00
3.	"I Should Care"	Stordahl; Weston; Cahn	July 2, 1948	2:59
4.	"Evidence"		July 2, 1948	2:31
5.	"Misterioso"		July 2, 1948	3:19
6.	"Misterioso" (alternate take)		July 2, 1948	2:43
7.	"Epistrophy"	Monk; Kenny Clarke	July 2, 1948	3:05
8.	"I Mean You"		July 2, 1948	2:44
9.	"Four in One"		July 23, 1951	3:27
10.	"Four in One" (alternate take)		July 23, 1951	3:26
11.	"Criss Cross"		July 23, 1951	2:55
12.	"Criss Cross" (alternate take)		July 23, 1951	2:48
13.	"Eronel"	Monk; Sulieman; Sadik Hakim	July 23, 1951	3:01
14.	"Straight, No Chaser"		July 23, 1951	2:54
15.	"Ask Me Now" (alternate take)		July 23, 1951	4:26
16.	"Ask Me Now"		July 23, 1951	3:12
17.	"Willow Weep for Me"	Ann Ronnell	July 23, 1951	3:00

Disc three
No.	Title	Writer(s)	Date recorded	Length
1.	"Skippy"		May 30, 1952	2:59
2.	"Skippy" (alternate take)		May 30, 1952	3:07
3.	"Hornin' In" (alternate take)		May 30, 1952	3:06
4.	"Hornin' In"		May 30, 1952	3:12
5.	"Sixteen" (first take)		May 30, 1952	3:28
6.	"Sixteen" (second take)		May 30, 1952	3:37
7.	"Carolina Moon"	Davis, Burke	May 30, 1952	3:26
8.	"Let's Cool One"		May 30, 1952	3:45
9.	"I'll Follow You"	Roy Turk; Fred E. Ahlert	May 30, 1952	3:46
10.	"Reflections"		April 14, 1957	7:01
11.	"Misterioso"		April 14, 1957	9:22

Disc four
No.	Title	Writer(s)	Date recorded	Length
1.	"Crepuscule with Nellie"		September 11, 1958	3:00
2.	"Trinkle, Tinkle"		September 11, 1958	10:08
3.	"In Walked Bud"		September 11, 1958	11:22
4.	"I Mean You"		September 11, 1958	13:53
5.	"Epistrophy"	K. Clarke*, T. Monk*	September 11, 1958	5:19

== Personnel ==
=== Musicians ===
==== October 15, 1947 ====
- Thelonious Monk – piano
- Idrees Sulieman – trumpet
- Danny Quebec West – alto saxophone
- Billy Smith – tenor saxophone
- Gene Ramey – bass
- Art Blakey – drums
  - recorded at WOR Studios, New York City

==== October 24, 1947 ====
- Thelonious Monk – piano
- Gene Ramey – bass
- Art Blakey – drums
  - recorded at WOR Studios, New York City

==== November 21, 1947 ====
- Thelonious Monk – piano
- George Taitt – trumpet
- Sahib Shihab – alto saxophone
- Bob Paige – bass
- Art Blakey – drums
  - recorded at WOR Studios, New York City

==== July 2, 1948 ====
- Milt Jackson – vibraphone
- Thelonious Monk – piano
- John Simmons – bass
- Shadow Wilson – drums
  - recorded at Apex Studios, New York City

==== July 23, 1951 ====
- Thelonious Monk – piano
- Sahib Shihab – alto saxophone (except "Ask Me Now")
- Milt Jackson – vibraphone (except "Ask Me Now")
- Al McKibbon – bass
- Art Blakey – drums
  - recorded at WOR Studios, New York City

==== May 30, 1952 ====
- Thelonious Monk – piano
- Kenny Dorham – trumpet
- Lou Donaldson – alto saxophone
- Lucky Thompson – tenor saxophone
- Nelson Boyd – bass
- Max Roach – drums
  - recorded at WOR Studios, New York City

==== April 14, 1957 ====
- Sonny Rollins – tenor saxophone
- J. J. Johnson – trombone
- Thelonious Monk – piano
- Paul Chambers – bass
- Art Blakey – drums
  - recorded at Van Gelder Studio, Hackensack, New Jersey

==== September 11, 1958 ====
- Thelonious Monk – piano
- John Coltrane – tenor saxophone
- Ahmed Abdul-Malik – bass
- Roy Haynes – drums
  - recorded live at the Five Spot, New York City

=== Technical personnel ===
==== Original ====
- Alfred Lion (discs 1–3) – producer
- Doug Hawkins (WOR Studios), Rudy Van Gelder (RVG Studios), Harry Smith & Naima Coltrane (The Five Spot) – recording engineer

==== Reissue ====
- Michael Cuscuna – reissue producer
- Malcolm Addey – remastering, disc and tape transfers, sound restoration
- Ron McMaster – disc and tape transfers, sound restoration
- Kenny Washington – pitch correction

== See also ==
- List of compositions by Thelonious Monk
