= Pres and Sweets =

Studio album by Lester Young and Harry Edison
- Released: 1956
- Recorded: November 1, 1955; Radio Recorders, Hollywood, CA
- Genre: Jazz
- Length: 47:19 CD reissue with bonus tracks
- Label: Norgran; MGN 1043
- Producer: Norman Granz

Harry Edison chronology
Buddy and Sweets (1955)	Pres and Sweets (1956)	Sweets (1956)

Lester Young chronology
It Don't Mean A Thing (1954)	Pres and Sweets (1955)	The Jazz Giants '56 (1956)

Pres and Sweets is an album by American jazz saxophonist Lester Young and trumpeter Harry Edison recorded in 1955 and originally released on the Norgran label.

== Reception ==
Professional ratings
Review scores
Source	Rating
AllMusic	4.5/5 stars
The Penguin Guide to Jazz Recordings	3/4 stars

Allmusic awarded the album 4½ stars stating "it is not surprising that the music is quite swinging. Young was in good form that day, obviously happy to be having a reunion with his fellow Count Basie alumnus".

== Track listing ==
1. "Mean to Me" (Fred E. Ahlert, Roy Turk) - 7:14
2. "Red Boy Blues" (Lester Young) - 5:11
3. "Pennies from Heaven" (Arthur Johnston, Johnny Burke) - 5:14
4. "That's All" (Alan Brandt, Bob Haymes) - 4:34
5. "One O'Clock Jump" (Count Basie) - 5:17
6. "She's Funny That Way" (Neil Moret, Richard A. Whiting) - 8:22
7. "It's the Talk of the Town" (Jerry Livingston, Al J. Neiburg, Marty Symes) - 5:37 Bonus track on CD reissue
8. "I Found a New Baby" (Jack Palmer, Spencer Williams) - 5:50 Bonus track on CD reissue

== Personnel ==
- Lester Young - tenor saxophone
- Harry Edison - trumpet
- Oscar Peterson - piano
- Herb Ellis - guitar
- Ray Brown - bass
- Buddy Rich - drums
