= Blue note (disambiguation) =

A blue note is a musical note played or sung lower than the corresponding note on a major scale.

Blue note may also refer to:

== Music ==
- The Blue Note (Columbia, Missouri), a rock, jazz, and pop music venue, established in 1980
- Blue Note Jazz Club, a chain of music clubs and restaurants, with branches in New York, Tokyo, Nagoya, Rio de Janeiro, São Paulo and Milan
  - Blue Note Jazz Festival, an annual festival in New York hosted by the jazz club, since 2011
- Blue Note Records, a record label which focuses on jazz music
- The Blue Note (Chicago), a Chicago jazz venue open from 1947 to 1960
- Le Blue Note, a Parisian jazz venue from 1958 to 1966

== Other uses ==
- The logo of the St. Louis Blues hockey team
- Blue note (aviation), the distinctive whine produced by some jet aircraft, as well as the sound of their engines and airframe noise
- "Blue Note" (Cloak & Dagger), the nineteenth episode and season 2 penultimate of Freeform's live-action show of Marvel's Cloak & Dagger
- Blue note, movie directed by Andrzej Żuławski from 1991 with Janusz Olejniczak and Sophie Marceau

== See also ==
- Blue Notes (disambiguation)
