= Teddy Wilson =

American jazz pianist (1912–1986)

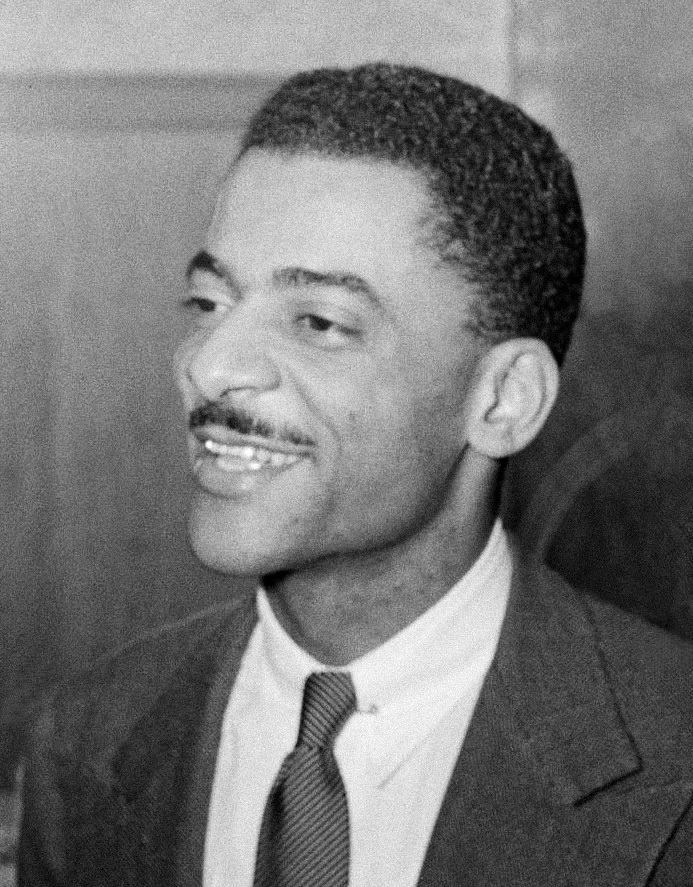
- Wilson in 1940

Background information
- Born: Theodore Shaw Wilson; November 24, 1912; Austin, Texas, U.S.
- Died: July 31, 1986 (aged 73) New Britain, Connecticut, U.S.
- Education: Tuskegee Institute
- Genre: Jazz
- Occupation: Musician
- Instrument: Piano

Theodore Shaw Wilson (November 24, 1912 – July 31, 1986) was an American jazz pianist. Described by critic Scott Yanow as "the definitive swing pianist", Wilson's piano style was gentle, elegant, and virtuosic. His style was highly influenced by Earl Hines and Art Tatum. His work was featured on the records of many of the biggest names in jazz, including Louis Armstrong, Lena Horne, Benny Goodman, Billie Holiday, and Ella Fitzgerald. With Goodman, he was one of the first black musicians to perform prominently alongside white musicians. In addition to his extensive work as a sideman, Wilson also led his own groups and recording sessions from the late 1920s to the 1980s.

== Life and career ==
=== Early life ===
Wilson was born in Austin, Texas. Under his parents as school teachers, his early music education began at the age of six with piano. Then, he studied violin, oboe, and clarinet at the Tuskegee Institute in Tuskegee, Alabama.

=== From 1929 to the early 1930s ===
Wilson moved to Detroit with his brother, musician Gus Wilson. Teddy began his professional career in 1929 with Speed Webb's band. Wilson then took over the pianist position of bandleader Milton Senior's band from Art Tatum in 1930. After touring with the band in Chicago, he decided to stay in Chicago and worked with Louis Armstrong and his orchestra between 1931 and 1933. He also understudied Earl Hines in Hines's Grand Terrace Cafe Orchestra before moving to New York to perform with Benny Carter's Chocolate Dandies in 1933.

=== From the mid-1930s to the mid-1940s ===
In 1935, while jamming with Benny Goodman and Carl Bellinger at a house party held by Mildred Bailey, they caught the attention of producer John Hammond, who arranged several recording sessions for them. These recordings became the basis of the Benny Goodman Trio, which consisted of Goodman, Wilson, and drummer Gene Krupa (and, later, vibraphonist Lionel Hampton). The trio performed during the Goodman big band's intermissions. By joining the trio, Wilson became one of the first black musicians to perform prominently in a racially integrated group.

Hammond was also instrumental in getting Wilson a contract with Brunswick Records from 1935 to 1939 to record hot swing arrangements of the popular songs of the day, with the growing jukebox trade in mind. During these years, he also took part in many sessions with swing musicians such as Lester Young, Roy Eldridge, Charlie Shavers, Red Norvo, Buck Clayton, and Ben Webster. Some 38 of his recordings have been hits and these are mostly chamber jazz recordings with singers such as Lena Horne, Helen Ward, Ella Fitzgerald, Mildred Bailey, and Billie Holiday. Among those vocals, Billie Holiday and Teddy Wilson made fourteen sides together in 1935 alone. From 1939 to 1942, he recorded for Columbia Records. He also left his residency with Goodman's band and formed his own 15-piece big band in 1939, but it only lasted around a year due to the lack of individuality in his band. In 1944, he returned to his sidemen position in the Benny Goodman Sextet and his musical association with Goodman continued until 1962. In the mid- to the late 1940s, Wilson mainly focused on studio recordings, on-screen performances, and radio broadcasts, instead of playing on public stages.

=== Café Society ===
After the demise of his big band, Wilson formed a sextet that performed at Café Society from 1940 to 1944. There, he led jazz shows called "chamber jazz" with a dance orchestra composed of himself, Frankie Newton, Ed Hall, and Billie Holiday. He was dubbed the "Marxist Mozart" by Howard "Stretch" Johnson due to his support for left-wing causes: he performed in benefit concerts for The New Masses journal and for Russian War Relief, and he chaired the Artists' Committee to elect Benjamin J. Davis (a New York City council member running on the Communist Party USA ballot line). Later, the FBI suspended Wilson's performing activities on broadcast, radio, and social activities alleging that he was involved in Communism.

=== The late 1940s and 1950s ===
From 1945 to 1952, Wilson taught at the Juilliard School. After that, he toured across numerous countries in Europe, including Scandinavia, England, Scotland, Germany, Holland, and Switzerland. In the 1950s, he recorded for Verve Records. Wilson can also be seen appearing as himself in the motion pictures Hollywood Hotel (1937) and The Benny Goodman Story (1955). He later worked as music director for the Dick Cavett Show.

=== Later years ===
Wilson resided in suburban Hillsdale, New Jersey. He was married three times, including to the songwriter Irene Kitchings. He performed as a soloist and with pickup groups until the final years of his life, as well as leading a trio with his sons Theodore Wilson on bass and Steven Wilson on drums.

In 1979, he was awarded an Honorary Doctorate of Music from Berklee College of Music.

He died of stomach cancer in New Britain, Connecticut, on July 31, 1986, aged 73. He is buried at Fairview Cemetery in New Britain. In addition to Theodore and Steven, Wilson had three more children, William, James (Jim) and Dune.

== Musical style ==
According to Wilson, he was first exposed to jazz by listening to the music of Duke Ellington, Earl Hines, Louis Armstrong, and Fats Waller. He then developed his own musical vocabulary based on the styles of Art Tatum and Earl Hines. When it comes to Tatum's influence, Wilson's fast right-hand runs can be traced to Tatum's similar right-hand embellishments. However, Wilson's playing focused on diatonic, "inside" harmonic ideas based on triads and extensions. He also pursued a style of improvisation based on lyrical melodic development in contrast to Tatum's elaborate re-harmonization. Furthermore, Wilson's playing is characterized by consistent dynamic expression with an elegant touch. Music professor Garth Alper speculates Wilson's fluid runs and gracefully relaxed rhythmic coordination with clean and even phrasing might have been reflections of his reserved personality and his experience with Benny Goodman under racial segregation when more flashy playing may have attracted unwanted attention. Teddy Wilson contributed to modernizing the pianistic articulation in contrast to the raw Harlem Stride Piano.

While adapting tenth voicing in his left hand and horn-like doubled-octave playing in the right hand from Earl Hines, he pursued a lighter and thinner texture with a relatively simple rhythmic ideas and a single melodic device than Hines.

Although he played with many bebop musicians, including Charlie Parker and Dizzy Gillespie, during his work as a sideman, Wilson held on to swing vocabulary based on chord tone arpeggios and diatonic harmony. His playing on "Congo Blues" for Red Norvo and His Sextet in 1945, for examples, demonstrates the stylistic contrast between Wilson and Dizzy Gillespie and Charlie Parker.

Wilson's style went on to influence other pianists such as his contemporary Mary Lou Williams, Mel Powell, Billy Kyle, Jess Stacy, and Joe Bushkin.

== Discography ==
=== As leader ===
- 1928-32 - The Chronological 1928-1932 (Classics, 1990)
- 1934-35 - The Chronological 1934-1935 (Classics, 1990) (four CBS recordings, rest Brunswick)
- 1935-36 - The Chronological 1935-1936 (Classics, 1990)
- 1936-37 - The Chronological 1936-1937 (Classics, 1990)
- 1937-00 - The Chronological 1937 (Classics, 1996)
- 1937-38 - The Chronological 1937-1938 (Classics, 1996)
- 1938-00 - The Chronological 1938 (Classics, 1996)
- 1939-00 - The Chronological 1939 (Classics, 1996)
- 1939-41 - The Chronological 1939-1941 (Classics, 1996)
- 1942-45 - The Chronological 1939-1941 (Classics, 1996)
- 1946-00 - The Chronological 1939-1941 (Classics, 1996)
- 1947-50 - The Chronological 1939-1941 (Classics, 1996)
- 1941-42: Columbia Presents Teddy Wilson (Columbia, 1942) (4x10"Lp)
- 1944: Teddy Wilson Sextet (The Onyx Club New York Original Live Recordings)
- 1952: Runnin' Wild (MGM)
- 1952: Just A Mood – Teddy Wilson Quartet Starring Harry James & Red Norvo (Columbia EP B-1569/5-1277)
- 1955: The Creative Teddy Wilson (Norgran) – also released as For Quiet Lovers (Verve)
- 1956: Pres and Teddy (Verve) with Lester Young
- 1956: I Got Rhythm (Verve)
- 1956: Intimate Listening (Verve)
- 1956: These Tunes Remind Me of You (Verve)
- 1957: The Impeccable Mr. Wilson (Verve)
- 1957: The Teddy Wilson Trio & Gerry Mulligan Quartet with Bob Brookmeyer at Newport (Verve)
- 1957: The Touch of Teddy Wilson (Verve)
- 1959: Mr. Wilson and Mr. Gershwin (Columbia)
- 1959: Gypsy in Jazz (Columbia)
- 1959: And Then They Wrote... (Columbia)
- 1963: Teddy Wilson 1964 (Cameo)
- 1967: Moonglow (Black Lion)
- 1968: The Noble Art of Teddy Wilson (Metronome)
- 1972: With Billie in Mind (Chiaroscuro)
- 1973: Runnin' Wild (Black Lion)
- 1976: Live at Santa Tecla
- 1980: Teddy Wilson Trio Revisits the Goodman Years
- 1983: Alone (Storyville)
- 1990: Air Mail Special

=== As sideman ===
- 1935: Mildred Bailey, Mildred Bailey and Her Alley Cats (Columbia)
- 1935–1939: Benny Goodman, The Complete RCA Victor Small Group Recordings (RCA)
- 1938: Benny Goodman, The Famous 1938 Carnegie Hall Jazz Concert (Columbia)
- 1946-1947: Sarah Vaughan, The Chronological 1946–1947 (Classics. ?)
- 1954: Ben Webster, Music for Loving (Norgran)
- 1973: Eiji Kitamura, Swing Special
- 1974: Phoebe Snow Phoebe Snow (album) (Shelter Records)
- 1975: Eiji Kitamura, Teddy and Eiji- Live Session
- 1980: Eiji Kitamura, Teddy Wilson Meets Eiji Kitamura
