= Mosaic Records =

- Founded: 1983
- Founder: Michael Cuscuna; Charlie Lourie
- Genre: Jazz
- Country of origin: U.S.
- Location: Stamford, Connecticut
- Official website: www.mosaicrecords.com

Mosaic Records is an American jazz record company and label established in 1982 by Michael Cuscuna and Charlie Lourie. It produces limited-edition box sets.

The sets recordings are leased from the major record companies, usually for a three- or five-year period, with the edition limited to a specific number of copies, typically 5,000. Sometimes the complete catalog of a label would appear: the complete masters of Milt Gabler's Commodore Records were contained in three sets consisting of some 66 LPs. In 2003, the company initiated the Select series of smaller sets, not necessarily "complete" in the usual sense. In 2006, the company began a third line, Mosaic Singles, a series dedicated to reissuing individual albums on CD that have not previously been available in US editions, or at all. In 2009, Mosaic returned to the vinyl format with the HQ Vinyl Series and began issuing three and four LP sets of 2,500-5,000 copies.

Mosaic's sets are primarily sold and distributed directly to customers, initially promoted through leading jazz publications, then mail order catalog, and now the internet. The first three years of releases did not sell particularly well. In 1986, Cuscuna reached out to a record-producing acquaintance, Fred Seibert, for help. With partner Alan Goodman their company, Fred/Alan Inc. in New York, devised a catalog and strategy that immediately increased sales almost tenfold and put the company on a solid footing for the first time. Goodman continues to write the copy for all new release sales.

Over 200 sets have now been issued by the company, with most sets' leases now expired, becoming sought after, expensive collector's items. Over three decades the jazz press and general publications have recognized Mosaic, with the New York Times naming it “the most distinctive reissue label in jazz,” All About Jazz calling the company “arguably the premier reissue label in jazz,” and Esquire suggesting it is “America’s most obsessive jazz label.”

== See also ==
- Discography of Mosaic Records
