= Thelonious Monk discography =

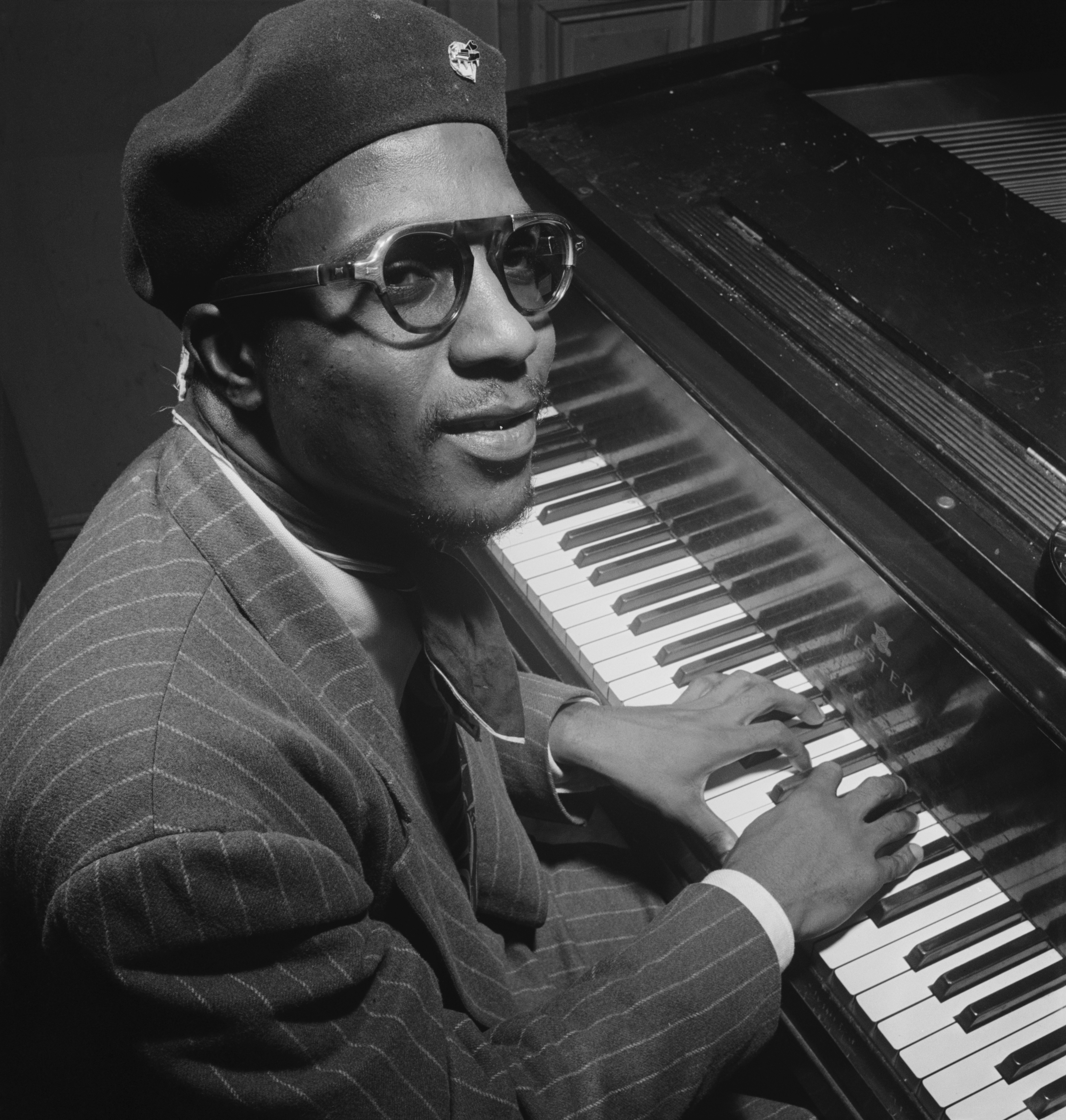
- Thelonious Monk at Minton's Playhouse, NYC, ca. Sept. 1947

The following is a discography of American jazz pianist and composer Thelonious Monk (1917–1982).

== Discography ==
=== Studio albums ===
Year	Title	Label	Catalog number	Date recorded	Notes
10-inch LPs
1947–1952: Blue Note years
1951	Genius of Modern Music, Vol. 1	Blue Note	Blue Note LP 5002		
1951	Genius of Modern Music, Vol. 2	Blue Note	Blue Note LP 5009		
1952–1954: Prestige years
1953	Thelonious	Prestige	PRLP 142	1952-10-15, -12-18	(Note: The majority of the contents of the first 4 of these five LPs were released, sequenced mostly in order, on a Prestige double-LP compilation in 1972, PR/PRT 24006, Thelonious Monk. The exception was the take of "Think of One" selected; on the compilation, Take 1 was used instead of the originally-selected Take 2.) (Note: The LPs were re-released by Craft Records in a limited edition in 2017.)
1954	Thelonious Monk Quintet Blows for LP	Prestige	PRLP 166	1953-11-13	
1954	Thelonious Monk Quintet	Prestige	PRLP 180	1954-05-11	
1954	Thelonious Monk Plays	Prestige	PRLP 189	1954-09-22	
1954	Sonny Rollins and Thelonious Monk	Prestige	PRLP 190	1954-10-25	
1954	Piano Solo	Disques Vogue		1954-06-04	
12-inch LPs
1955–1959: Riverside years
1956	Thelonious Monk Plays the Music of Duke Ellington	Riverside	RLP 12-201	1955-07-21, -22	
1956	The Unique Thelonious Monk	Riverside	RLP 12-209	1956-03-17, -04-03	
1957	Brilliant Corners	Riverside	RLP 12-226	1956-10-15, -12-07	
1957	Thelonious Himself	Riverside	RLP 12-235	1957-04-12, -16	
1957	Monk's Music	Riverside	RLP 12-242	1957-06-26	
1957	Mulligan Meets Monk	Riverside	RLP 12-247	1957-08-12, -13	with Gerry Mulligan
1959	5 by Monk by 5	Riverside	RLP 12-305	1959-06-01, -02, -04	
1959	Thelonious Alone in San Francisco	Riverside	RLP 12-312	1959-10-21, -22	recorded in Fugazi Hall
1961	Thelonious Monk with John Coltrane	Jazzland	JLP-46	1957	with John Coltrane
1962–1968: Columbia years
1963	Monk's Dream	Columbia			
1963	Criss-Cross	Columbia			
1964	It's Monk's Time	Columbia			
1965	Monk	Columbia			
1965	Solo Monk	Columbia			
1967	Straight, No Chaser	Columbia			
1968	Underground	Columbia			
1968	Monk's Blues	Columbia			
1971: Black Lion session
1972	Something in Blue	Black Lion	BLP 30119	1971-11-15	
1973	The Man I Love	Black Lion	BLP 30141	1971-11-15	

=== Live albums ===
Year	Title	Label	Date Recorded	Venue	Notes
1958	Thelonious in Action	Riverside	1958-08-07	Five Spot Café	
1958	Misterioso	Riverside	1958-08-07	Five Spot Café	
1959	The Thelonious Monk Orchestra at Town Hall	Riverside	1959-02-28	The Town Hall	
1960	At the Blackhawk	Riverside	1960-04-29	Black Hawk	
1963	Thelonious Monk in Italy	Riverside	1961-04-21	Teatro Lirico	
1963	In Tokyo 1	Columbia	1963-05-21		
1963	In Tokyo 2	Columbia	1963-05-21		
1964	Miles & Monk at Newport	Columbia	1963-04	Newport Jazz Festival	with unrelated 1958 Miles Davis performance
1964	Big Band and Quartet in Concert	Columbia	1963-12-30	Philharmonic Hall, New York	
1965	Monk in France	Riverside			
1965	Misterioso (Recorded on Tour)	Columbia	various	various	
1969	Monk in Tokyo	CBS Sony	1963-05-21		reissued complete 1973
1981	April in Paris / Live	Milestone	1961-04-18		
1982	Live at the It Club	Columbia	1964-10-31, -11-01	"It" Club	
1982	Live at the Jazz Workshop	Columbia	1964-11-03, -04	Jazz Workshop	
1987	Live in Stockholm	Dragon	1961-05-16		
1988	Thelonious Monk Nonet Live in Paris 1967	France's Concert	1967-11-03		
1989	Live in Paris, 1964	France's Concert	1964-02-23	Maison de la Radio	
1993	Discovery! Live at the Five Spot	Blue Note	1958-09-11	Five Spot Café	Thelonious Monk Quartet with John Coltrane
1994	Live at Monterey Jazz Festival '63	Storyville	1963-09-21, -22	Monterey Jazz Festival	
2005	Thelonious Monk Quartet with John Coltrane at Carnegie Hall	Blue Note	1957-11-29	Carnegie Hall	
2007	Live at the 1964 Monterey Jazz Festival	Monterey Jazz Festival Records	1964-09-20	Monterey Jazz Festival	
2013	Paris 1969	Blue Note	1969-12-15	Salle Pleyel, Paris	
2014	Complete 1961 Amsterdam Concert	Solar	1961-04-15		
2018	Mønk	Gearbox	1963-03-05		
2020	Palo Alto	Impulse!	1968-10-27	Palo Alto High School	

=== Compilations ===
Year	Title	Label	Catalog number	Note
1956	Milt Jackson and the Thelonious Monk Quintet	Blue Note	BLP 1509	
1956	Genius of Modern Music, Vol. One	Blue Note	BLP 1510	
1956	Genius of Modern Music, Vol. Two	Blue Note	BLP 1511	
1956	Thelonious Monk Trio	Prestige	PRLP 7027	
1956	Monk	Prestige	PRLP 7053	
1956	Thelonious Monk and Sonny Rollins	Prestige	PRLP 7075	
1967	Monk's Miracles	Columbia Record Club	D 338	mail order only
1969	Monk's Greatest Hits	Columbia	CS 9775	
1969	The Best of Thelonious Monk	Riverside	RS 3037	
1979	Always Know	Columbia	JG 35720	double album, vinyl only
1983	Monk's Classic Recordings			
1984	Blues Five Spot			
1998	Monk Alone: The Complete Solo Studio Recordings of Thelonious Monk 1962–1968	Sony		2 CD
2001	The Columbia Years: '62–'68	Sony		3 CD
2003	The Essential Thelonious Monk	Columbia/Legacy		
2006	The Complete 1957 Riverside Recordings	Riverside		with John Coltrane; 2 CD

==== On other labels ====
- Blue Sphere (Black Lion, ?) – recorded on November 15, 1971, AKA Nice Work in London
- 1959: Les Liaisons Dangereuses 1960 (Sam, 2017) – recorded on July 27, 1959

=== Box sets ===
Year	Title	Label	Format	Notes
1983	The Complete Blue Note Recordings of Thelonious Monk	Mosaic	4 LP	
1989	The Complete Vogue Recordings/The Black Lion Sessions	Mosaic	3 LP; 3 CD	
1991	The Complete Riverside Recordings of Thelonious Monk	Riverside	15 CD	
1994	The Complete Blue Note Recordings	Blue Note	4 CD	
2000	The Complete Prestige Recordings of Thelonious Monk	Prestige	3 CD	
2010	All Monk. The Riverside Albums	Universal	16 CD	
2012	The Thelonious Monk Quartet Complete Columbia Studio Albums Collection	Sony	6 CD	
2015	The Thelonious Monk Complete Columbia Live Albums Collection	Sony	10 CD	

=== Singles ===
Year	A-side	B-side	Label	Catalog number	Notes
1947–1952: Blue Note years
10-inch shellac, 78 RPM
	"Thelonious"	"Suburban Eyes"	Blue Note	BN 542	
	"'Round About Midnight"	"Well, You Needn't"	Blue Note	BN 543	
	"Evonce"	"Off Minor"	Blue Note	BN 547	
	"In Walked Bud"	"Epistrophy"	Blue Note	BN 548	
	"Ruby, My Dear"	"Evidence"	Blue Note	BN 549	
	"Humph"	"Misterioso"	Blue Note	BN 560	
	"I Should Care"	"All the Things You Are"	Blue Note	BN 1201	
	"I Mean You"	"Symphonette"	Blue Note	BN 1564	"Symphonette" not recorded by Monk; Tadd Dameron performance
	"Who Knows"	"Monk's Mood"	Blue Note	BN 1565	
	"April in Paris"	"Nice Work If You Can Get It"	Blue Note	BN 1575	
	"Four in One"	"Straight, No Chaser"	Blue Note	BN 1589	
	"Criss Cross"	"Eronel"	Blue Note	BN 1590	
1952	"Ask Me Now"	"Willow Weep for Me"	Blue Note	BN 1591	"Willow Weep for Me" credited to Milt Jackson
	"Skippy"	"Let's Cool One"	Blue Note	BN 1602	
	"Hornin' In"	"Carolina Moon"	Blue Note	BN 1603	
7-inch, 45 RPM
	"Lillie"	"Willow Weep for Me"	Blue Note	BN 45-1646	credited to Milt Jackson
	"'Round About Midnight"	"In Walked Bud"	Blue Note	BN 45-1664	

=== As sideman ===
==== With Art Blakey ====
- Art Blakey's Jazz Messengers with Thelonious Monk (Atlantic, 1958)
- The Giants of Jazz (Atlantic, 1971)

==== With Dave Brubeck ====
- Summitt Sessions (Columbia, 1970) – 1 track

==== With Miles Davis ====
- Bags' Groove (Prestige, 1954)
- Miles Davis and the Modern Jazz Giants (Prestige, 1954)

==== With Coleman Hawkins ====
- Bean and the Boys (Prestige, 1972) – recorded in 1944. 4 tracks only.

==== With Milt Jackson ====
- Wizard of the Vibes (Blue Note, 1948) – a.k.a. Milt Jackson (Blue Note, 1956)

==== With Charlie Parker and Dizzy Gillespie ====
- Bird and Diz (Verve, 1950)

==== With Sonny Rollins ====
- Moving Out (Prestige, 1954)
- Sonny Rollins, Vol. 2 (Blue Note, 1957)

==== With Gigi Gryce ====
- Nica's Tempo (Savoy, 1955)

==== With Clark Terry ====
- In Orbit (Riverside, 1958)
