= 1953 in jazz =

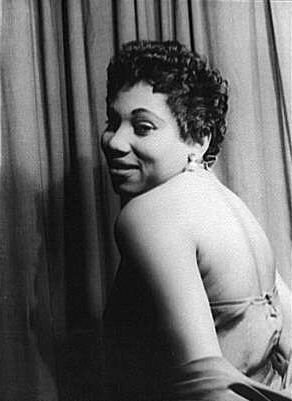
- Leontyne Price from Porgy and Bess
- Decade: 1950s in jazz
- Music: 1953 in music
- Standards: List of post-1950 jazz standards
- See also: 1952 in jazz – 1954 in jazz

This is a timeline documenting events of Jazz in the year 1953.

== Events ==
- The musical Porgy and Bess was revived, playing in many European cities.

== Album releases ==
- Charlie Parker/Dizzy Gillespie: Jazz at Massey Hall
- Duke Ellington: Piano Reflections
- Ben Webster: King of the Tenors
- Modern Jazz Quartet: Django
- Shorty Rogers: Cool and Crazy
- Jay Jay Johnson: Four Trombones
- Stan Kenton: Sketches on Standards
- Miles Davis: Blue Period
- Miles Davis: Young Man with a Horn (also known as Miles Davis, Vol. 1)
- Thelonious Monk: Thelonious
- Oscar Pettiford: The New Oscar Pettiford Sextet

== Deaths ==
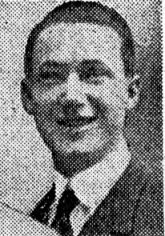
Larry Shields c. 1915

April

- 23 – Peter DeRose, American Hall of Fame composer of jazz and pop music during the Tin Pan Alley era (born 1900).

May

- 16 – Django Reinhardt, French virtuoso guitarist and composer (born 1910).

June

- 3 – Mike Mosiello, Italian-born American trumpeter (born 1896).
- 26 – Julius Foss, Danish composer, organist, and guitarist (born 1879).

August

- 19 – Tiny Kahn, American drummer, arranger, and composer (born 1923).

November

- 21 – Larry Shields, American clarinetist (born 1893).

Unknown date

- Jimmy "Jammin'" Smith, American trumpet player (born 1926).

== Births ==
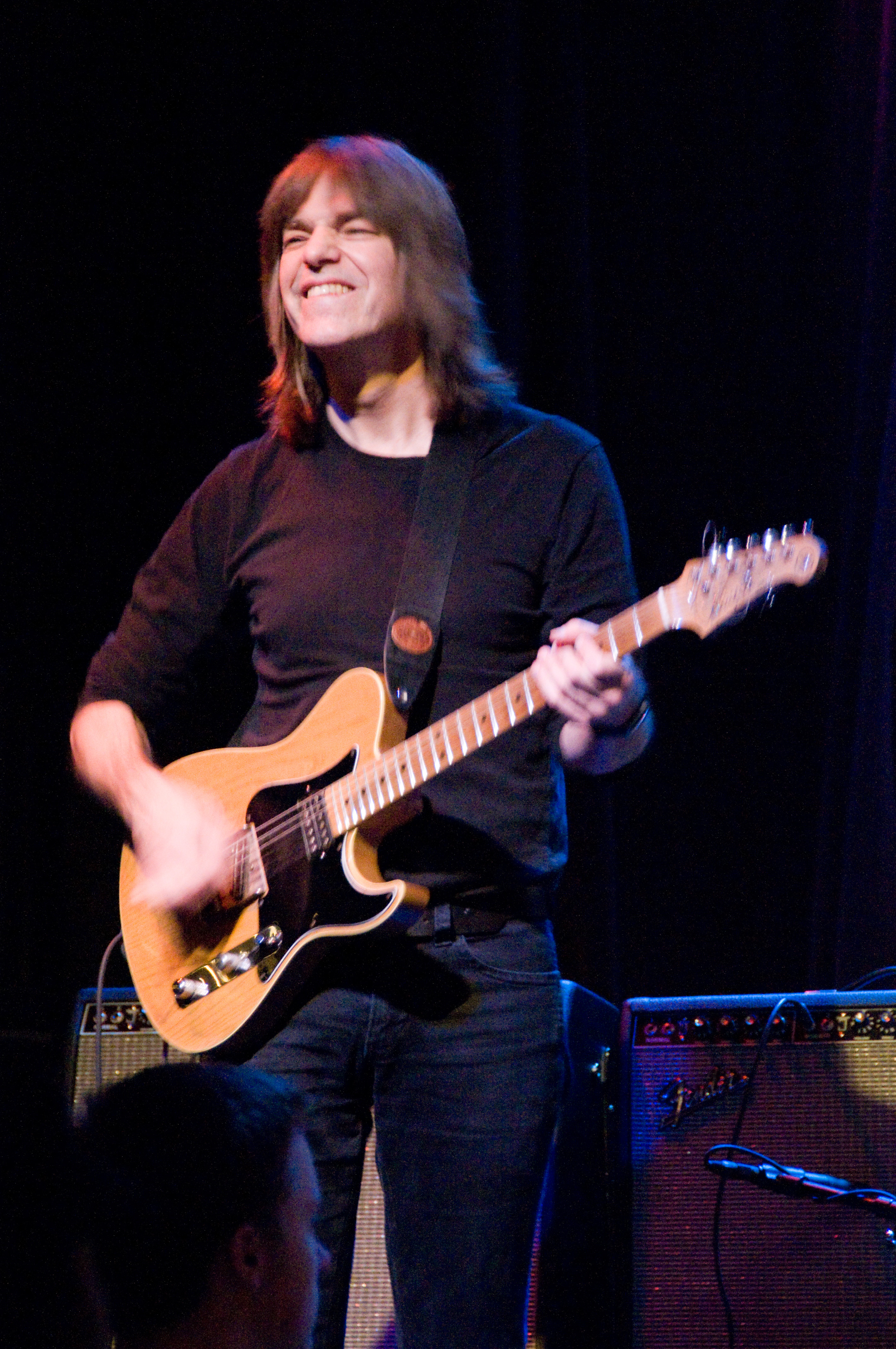
Mike Stern at Jazz Alley, 2007.

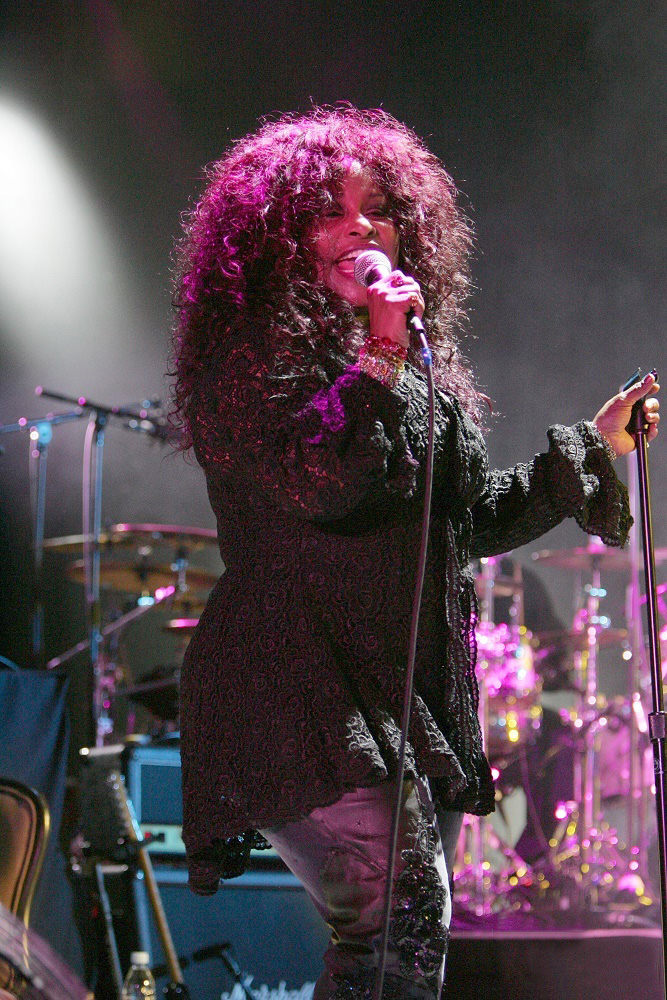
Chaka Khan 2006.

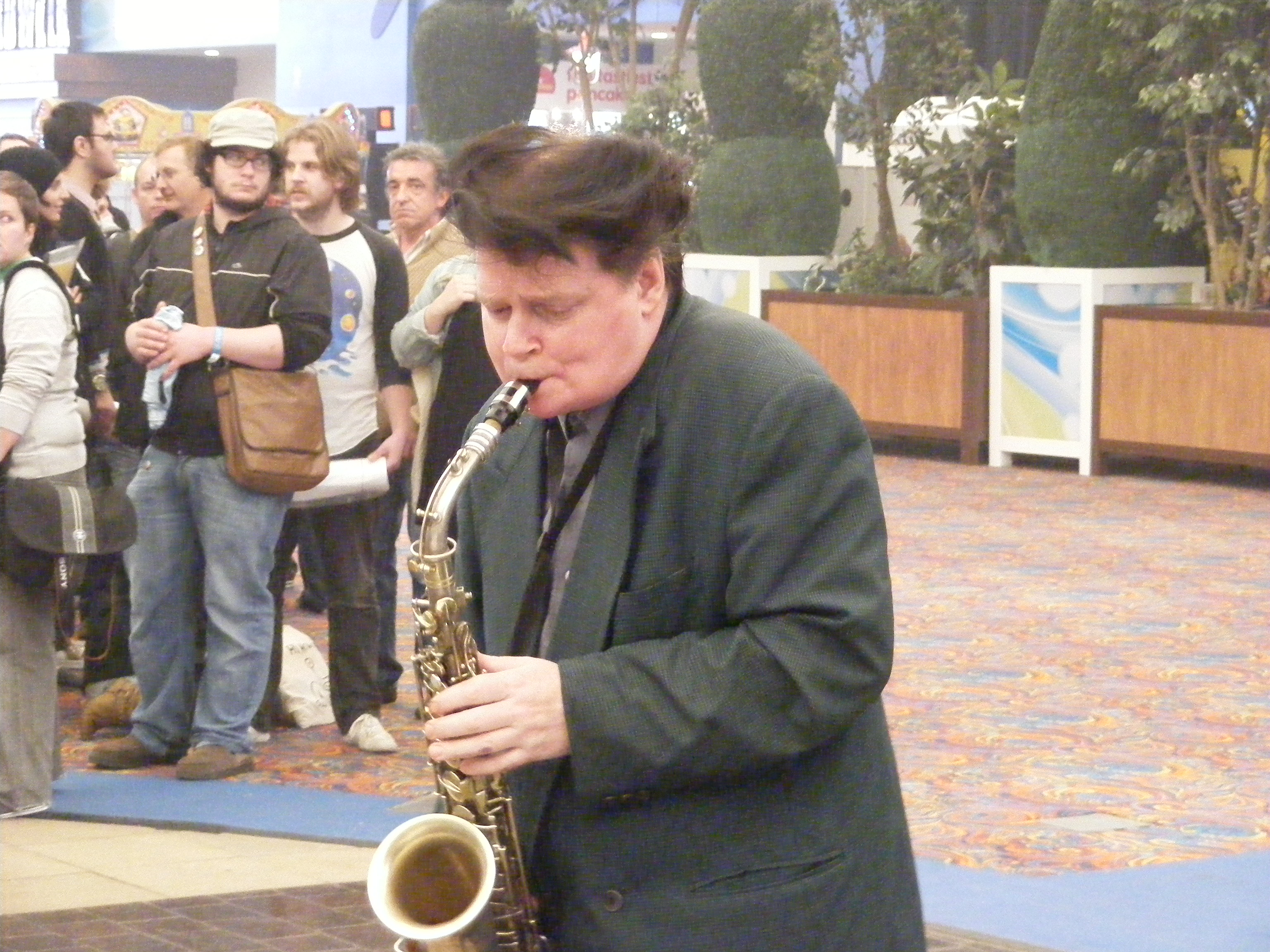
James Chance 2010.

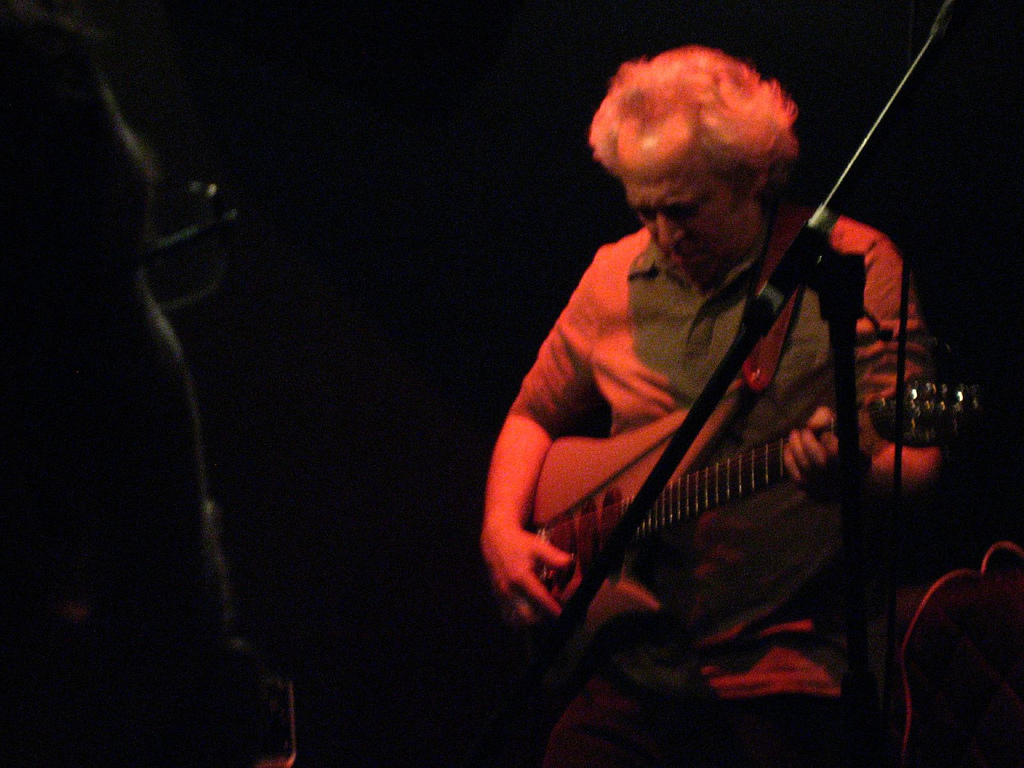
David Torn 2008.

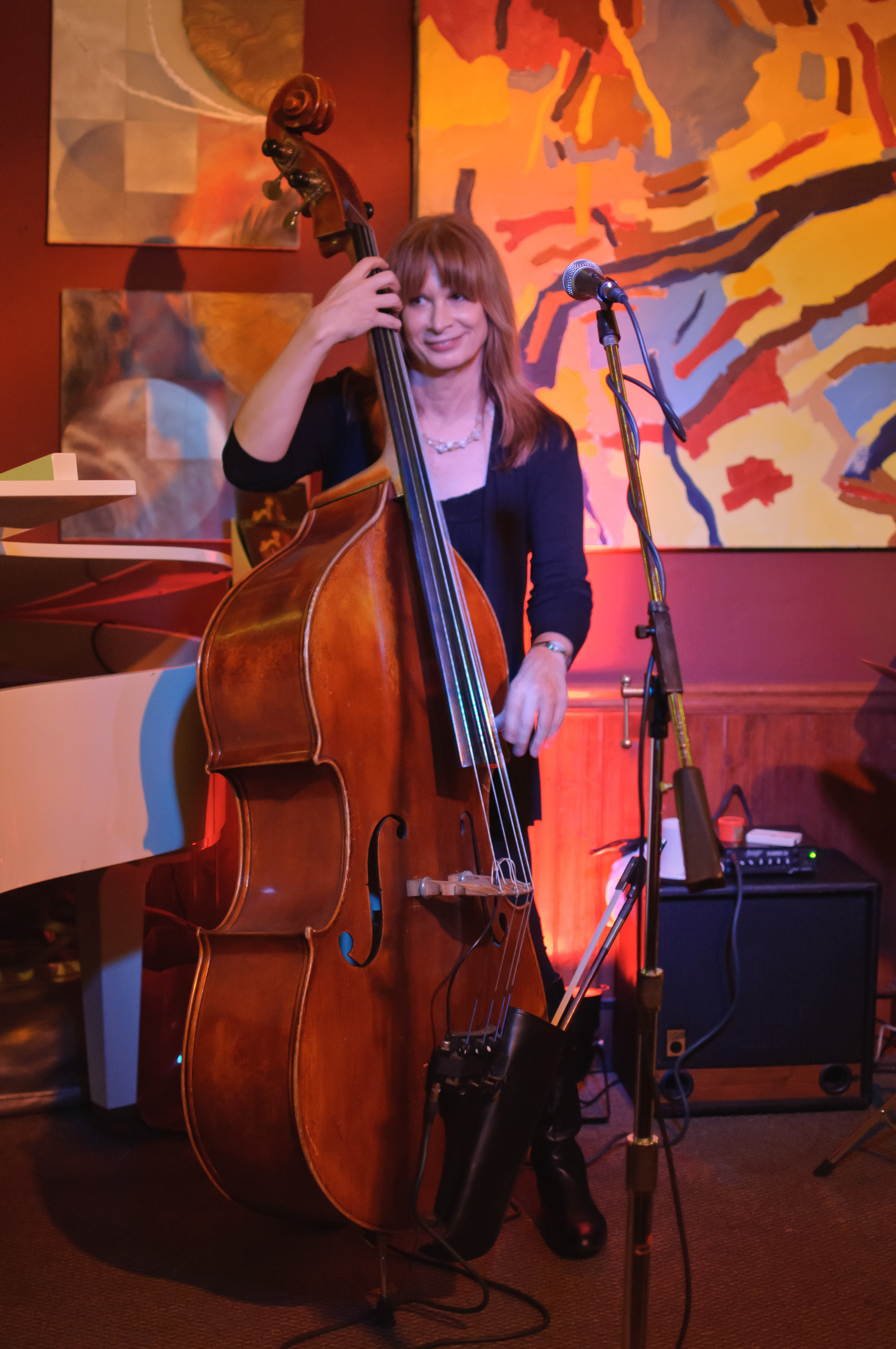
Jennifer Leitham 2012.

January

- 1 – Greg Carmichael, American guitarist, Acoustic Alchemy.
- 5 – Paul Wertico, American drummer.
- 6 – Jon Eberson, Norwegian guitarist and composer.
- 10 – Mike Stern, American guitarist.
- 17 – Jeff Berlin, American bassist.
- 20 – Andrew Bisset, Australian author, music educator, and singer (died 2005).
- 27 – Bob Mintzer, American saxophonist, composer, arranger, and big band leader.
- 31 – Big Time Sarah, American singer (died 2015).

February

- 2 – Louis Sclavis, French clarinetist, bass clarinetist, and soprano saxophonist.
- 7 – T. K. Blue, American saxophonist.
- 18 – Erling Aksdal, Norwegian pianist.
- 24 – Rob Burns, English-New Zealand bass guitarist, author, and academic.
- 25 – Reggie Lucas, American guitarist and songwriter (died 2018).

March

- 1 – Gary Braith, French guitarist and composer.
- 4 – John Esposito, American pianist.
- 11 – Andy Dickens, English jazz trumpeter, singer, and bandleader.
- 16 – Kei Akagi, Japanese-American pianist.
- 19 – Michele Rosewoman, American pianist.
- 21 – Taborah Johnson, Canadian singer and actor.
- 22 – John Shifflett, American bassist (died 2017).
- 23 – Chaka Khan, American singer-songwriter.
- 27 – Masayoshi Takanaka, Japanese guitarist.
- 29 – Jørgen Emborg, Danish pianist.

April

- 1 – Randy Crouch, American fiddle player and multi-instrumentalist.
- 2
  - Dick Oatts, American saxophonist, multi-instrumentalist, composer, and educator.
- 13
  - Charles Foster Johnson, American blogger, software developer, and guitarist.
  - Grant Geissman, American guitarist and composer.
  - Tom Olstad, Norwegian drummer.
- 16 – Kurt Maloo, Swiss singer-songwriter, composer and record producer.
- 18 – Danny Gottlieb, American drummer, Lt. Dan Band and Pat Metheny Group.
- 20 – James Chance, American saxophonist, keyboard player, songwriter, and singer.
- 24 – Trudy Silver, American pianist and composer.
- 25 – Per Kolstad, Norwegian pianist, Lava.

May

- 1
  - James Newton, American flautist.
  - Randy Halberstadt, American pianist, composer, recording artist, author, and teacher.
- 2 – James Chirillo, American guitarist, banjoist, and composer.
- 4
  - Michael Di Pasqua, American drummer and percussionist (died 2016).
  - Oleta Adams, American singer and pianist.
- 6 – Paul Dunmall, British saxophonist.
- 8 – Mike Miller, American guitarist.
- 10 – Alex Foster, American saxophonist.
- 12 – Odd Riisnæs, Norwegian saxophonist.
- 21 – Joanie Bartels, American singer.
- 22 – Jon Burr, American upright bassist and author.
- 26 – David Torn, American guitarist, composer, and producer.

June

- 2 – Vidar Johansen, Norwegian saxophonist.
- 9 – Ken Navarro, Italian-American guitarist and composer
- 26 – Gary Valente, American trombonist

July

- 3 – Bruce Kapler, American saxophonist, singer and multi-instrumentalist, CBS Orchestra.
- 8 – Ignacio Berroa, Cuban drummer.
- 10 – Attila László, Hungarian guitarist and composer.
- 13 – Sigurd Ulveseth, Norwegian upright bassist.
- 22 – Jimmy Bruno, American guitarist.
- 24 – Jon Faddis, American trumpet player, conductor, composer, and educator.
- 27 – Edward Wilkerson, American composer, arranger, saxophonist, pianist, and clarinetist.

August

- 4 – Jeff Hamilton, American drummer, Clayton-Hamilton Jazz Orchestra.
- 10 – Jennifer Leitham or Lefty, American upright bassist.
- 18 – David Benoit, American pianist, composer and producer.
- 23 – Bobby Watson, American saxophonist, composer, and educator.
- 28 – Michael Gregory, American guitarist, singer, and songwriter.

September

- 1 – Don Blackman, American pianist, singer, and songwriter (died 2013).
- 2 – John Zorn, American composer, arranger, producer, saxophonist, and multi-instrumentalist.
- 10 – Craig S. Harris, American trombonist.
- 11 – Renée Geyer, Australian singer (died 2023).
- 14 – Tom Cora, American cellist and composer (died 1998).
- 16 – Earl Klugh, American guitarist and composer.
- 26
  - Dan Knight, American pianist, composer, educator, and author.
  - Vic Juris, American guitarist (died 2019).
- 28 – Keni Burke, American singer, songwriter, record producer, and multi-instrumentalist.

October

- 2
  - Big Al Carson, American singer.
  - Stein Erik Tafjord, Norwegian tubist.
- 7 – Yoshiaki Miyanoue, Japanese guitarist.
- 14 – Kazumi Watanabe, Japanese guitarist.
- 17 – Joseph Bowie, American trombonist.
- 21 – Marc Johnson American upright bassist.
- 27 – Robert Irving III, American pianist, composer, arranger and music educator.

November

- 2 – Ernest Dawkins, American saxophonist, Ethnic Heritage Ensemble.
- 3 – Azar Lawrence, American saxophonist.
- 7 – Erik Balke, Norwegian saxophonist.
- 11 – Kahil El'Zabar, American percussionist, multi-instrumentalist, and composer.
- 13
  - Alex Coke, American saxophonist and flutist.
  - Dennis Taylor, American saxophonist and clarinetist (died 2010).
- 17 – Federico Ramos, Uruguayan guitarist, arranger, producer, and composer.
- 18 – Alan Murphy, English guitarist (died 1989).
- 27 – Lyle Mays, American pianist and composer.

December

- 5 – John Molo, American drummer and percussionist.
- 9 – Jill Saward, British singer, musician, and composer, Shakatak.
- 10
  - Diane Schuur, American singer and pianist.
  - Eugenio Colombo, Italian saxophonist and flautist, Italian Instabile Orchestra.
- 17
  - Ikue Mori, American drummer, composer, and graphic designer.
  - John Doheny, American tenor saxophonist and band leader.
- 25 – Steve Barta, American-Brazilian jazz pianist.
- 28 – Gilberto "Pulpo" Colón Jr., American pianist, composer, arranger, producer, and band leader.

Unknown date

- Darol Anger, American violinist.
- Hilario Durán, Cuban pianist.
- Kevin Toney, American pianist and composer.
- Paolo Rustichelli, Italian-American pianist, composer, and producer.

== See also ==
- 1950s in jazz
- List of years in jazz
- 1953 in music

== Bibliography ==
- The New Real Book, Volume I. Sher Music. 1988. ISBN 0-9614701-4-3.
- The New Real Book, Volume II. Sher Music. 1991. ISBN 0-9614701-7-8.
- The New Real Book, Volume III. Sher Music. 1995. ISBN 1-883217-30-X.
- The Real Book, Volume I (6th ed.). Hal Leonard. 2004. ISBN 0-634-06038-4.
- The Real Book, Volume II (2nd ed.). Hal Leonard. 2007. ISBN 978-1-4234-2452-9.
- The Real Book, Volume III (2nd ed.). Hal Leonard. 2006. ISBN 0-634-06136-4.
- The Real Jazz Book. Warner Bros. ISBN 978-91-85041-36-7.
- The Real Vocal Book, Volume I. Hal Leonard. 2006. ISBN 0-634-06080-5.
