= Thelonious Monk: The Complete Riverside Recordings =

Compilation album by Thelonious Monk
- Released: 1986
- Label: Riverside

Thelonious Monk: The Complete Riverside Recordings is a comprehensive compilation of the recordings made by Thelonious Monk for Riverside Records between 21 July 1955 and 21 April 1961. It was released by Riverside in 1986 on 22 LPs or on 15 CDs. It contains all the tracks previously released both on the original and on the later expanded CD versions of all his Riverside albums, together with some tracks never previously released.

== Reception ==
Professional ratings
Review scores
Source	Rating
Penguin Guide to Jazz	👑

Starting in 1992, this album has been awarded a crown in all nine editions of The Penguin Guide to Jazz Recordings.

== Track listing ==
=== Volume 1 (Discs 1–4) ===
==== Disc 1 (62:36) ====
1. "It Don't Mean A Thing (If It Ain't Got That Swing)" – 4:39
2. "Sophisticated Lady" – 4:28
3. "I Got It Bad (And That Ain't Good)" – 5:53
4. "Black And Tan Fantasy" – 3:25
5. "Mood Indigo" – 3:14
6. "I Let A Song Go Out of My Heart" – 5:41
7. "Solitude" – 3:43
8. "Caravan" – 5:55
9. "Liza, All The Clouds'll Roll Away" – 3:11
10. "Memories of You" – 4:17
11. "Honeysuckle Rose" – 5:31
12. "Darn That Dream" – 6:29
13. "Tea For Two" – 5:55

==== Disc 2 (59:08) ====
1. "You Are Too Beautiful" – 4:55
2. "Just You, Just Me" – 7:58
3. "Ba-Lue Bolivar Ba-Lues-Are" – 13:24
4. "Pannonica" – opening (previously unissued) – 2:35
5. "Pannonica" – 8:50
6. "Brilliant Corners" – 7:46
7. "I Surrender, Dear" – 7:50
8. "Bemsha Swing" – 5:31

==== Disc 3 (64:20) ====
1. "I Don't Stand A Ghost of a Chance With You" (take 5 – previously issued only in Italy) – 4:12
2. "I Don't Stand A Ghost of a Chance With You" (take 7 – originally issued)" – 4:21
3. "I Should Care" (take 1 – previously unissued)" – 3:28
4. "I Should Care" (take 2 – previously issued only in Italy) – 3:19
5. "I Should Care" (take 3 – originally issued) – 3:13
6. "Round Midnight – In Progress" – 21:55
7. "Round Midnight" (take 7 – originally issued) – 6:41
8. "April in Paris" – 3:52
9. "I'm Getting Sentimental Over You" – 4:04
10. "Monk's Mood" – false start (previously unissued) – 0:57
11. "Monk's Mood" – 7:52

==== Disc 4 (59:19) ====
1. "Functional" (take 1 – alternate) – 9:43
2. "Functional" (take 2 – originally issued) – 9:18
3. "All Alone" – 4:51
4. "Crepuscule With Nellie" (take 1 on 25 June – previously unissued) – 4:34
5. "Crepuscule With Nellie" – breakdown (previously unissued) – 1:01
6. "Blues For Tomorrow" – 13:32
7. "Off Minor" (take 4 – alternate) – 5:14
8. "Off Minor" (take 5 – originally issued) – 5:08
9. "Abide With Me" – 0:53
10. "Crepuscule With Nellie" (take 4-5 – previously unissued) – 4:46
11. "Crepuscule With Nellie" (take 6 – originally issued) – 4:39

=== Volume 2 (Discs 5–8) ===
==== Disc 5 (68:20) ====
1. "Epistrophy" – fragment – 4:31
2. "Epistrophy" – 4:55
3. "Well, You Needn't" (previously unissued) – 4:29
4. "Well, You Needn't" – 6:12
5. "Ruby, My Dear" – 4:31
6. "Ruby, My Dear" – 3:22
7. "Nutty" – 7:01
8. "Twinkle, Twinkle" – 3:04
9. "Straight, No Chaser" – 5:27
10. "Straight, No Chaser" – 6:58
11. "Rhythm-A-Ning" – 5:19

==== Disc 6 (65:20) ====
1. "I Mean You" – 6:22
2. "I Mean You" – 6:31
3. "I Mean You" – 6:51
4. "Round Midnight" – 8:27
5. "Decidedly" – 5:52
6. "Decidedly" – 6:35
7. "Sweet And Lovely" – 7:15
8. "Coming on the Hudson" – 6:03
9. "In Orbit" – 4:04
10. "One Foot in the Gutter" – 7:20

==== Disc 7 (67:14) ====
1. "Trust in Me" – 4:31
2. "Let's Cool One" – 4:55
3. "Pea-Eye" – 4:29
4. "Argentia" – 6:12
5. "Moonlight Fiesta" – 4:31
6. "Buck's Business" – 3:22
7. "Flugelin' The Blues" – 7:01
8. "Very Near Blue" – 3:04
9. "Evidence" (previously unissued) – 10:15
10. "Blues Five Spot" – 9:54
11. "In Walked Bud – Epistrophy (theme)" – 10:57

==== Disc 8 (59:46) ====
1. "Unidentified Solo Piano" – 1:54
2. "Round Midnight" – 6:15
3. "Bye-Ya – Epistrophy" (theme) (previously unissued)" – 11:54
4. "Light Blue" – 5:14
5. "Coming on the Hudson" – 5:23
6. "Rhythm-A-Ning" – 9:28
7. "Just A Gigolo" – 2:08
8. "Blue Monk" – 8:29
9. "Evidence" – 8:45
10. "Epistrophy" (theme) – 1:07

=== Volume 3 (Discs 9–12) ===
==== Disc 9 (53:13) ====
1. "Nutty" – 5:23
2. "Blues Five Spot" – 8:12
3. "Let's Cool One" – 9:15
4. "In Walked Bud" – 11:20
5. "Misterioso" – 10:47
6. "Epistrophy" (theme – #2) – 1:04
7. "In Walked Bud" – 7:08
8. "Blue Monk" – 8:21

==== Disc 10 (51:26) ====
1. "Rhythm-A-Ning" – 5:52
2. "Monk's Mood" – 10:21
3. "Friday The 13th" – 9:30
4. "Little Rootie Tootie" – 8:52
5. "Off Minor" – 7:50
6. "Thelonious" – 3:03
7. "Crepuscule With Nellie" – 4:50
8. "Little Rootie Tootie – Encore" – 8:30

==== Disc 11 (66:46) ====
1. "Played Twice" (take 1 – 2nd alternate) – 6:57
2. "Played Twice" (take 2 – alternate) – 7:54
3. "Played Twice" (originally issued) – 8:00
4. "Straight, No Chaser" – 9:22
5. "Ask Me Now" – 10:47
6. "I Mean You" – 9:49
7. "Jackie-ing" – 6:07
8. "Round Lights" – 3:36
9. "Pannonica" – 3:52
10. "Blue Monk" – 3:43

==== Disc 12 (66:25) ====
1. "Ruby, My Dear" – 3:59
2. "There's Danger in Your Eyes, Cherie" – 4:05
3. "There's Danger in Your Eyes, Cherie" – 4:20
4. "Everything Happens To Me" – 5:39
5. "Reflections" – 5:07
6. "Remember" – 2:43
7. "Bluehawk" – 3:38
8. "You Took The Words Right Out of My Heart" – 4:02
9. "San Francisco Holiday" – 8:50
10. "Just You, Just Me" (previously unissued) – 7:09
11. "Round Midnight" (previously unissued) – 7:53
12. "San Francisco Holiday" (take 2 – alternate) – 8:31

=== Volume 4 (Discs 13–15) ===
==== Disc 13 (68:44) ====
1. "I'm Getting Sentimental Over You" – 6:12
2. "Evidence" – 7:07
3. "Epistrophy" (theme) – 1:02
4. "Epistrophy" – 6:39
5. "Four in One" (take 1 – previously unissued) – 7:34
6. "Let's Call This" – 8:34
7. "Round Midnight" – 12:05
8. "San Francisco Holiday" (take 3 – originally issued) – 9:09
9. "Four in One" (take 2 – originally issued) – 8:42
10. "Epistrophy" (closing theme) (previously unissued) – 1:15

==== Disc 14 (63:37) ====
1. "Well, You Needn't" – 11:30
2. "Crepuscule With Nellie" – 2:39
3. "Jacki-ing" – 10:11
4. "Body And Soul" – 2:47
5. "Off Minor" – 11:41
6. "April in Paris" – 1:19
7. "I Mean You" – 11:02
8. "Rhythm-A-Ning" – 10:37
9. "Just A Gigolo" – 1:45

==== Disc 15 (69:51) ====
1. "Hackensack" – 9:46
2. "Epistrophy" – 6:12
3. "I'm Getting Sentimental Over You" – 8:33
4. "Jackie-Ing" – 4:53
5. "Body And Soul" – 4:48
6. "Straight, No Chaser" – 9:03
7. "Crepuscule With Nellie" – 2:42
8. "Bemsha Swing" – 6:56
9. "San Francisco Holiday" – 6:57
10. "Rhythm-A-Ning" – 5:47
11. "Epistrophy" – 5:03

== Sessions and personnel ==
Thelonious Monk plays piano on all tracks except where noted.

Disc 1, tracks 1–8: 21 and 27 July 1955, Rudy Van Gelder Studio, Hackensack, NJ – see Thelonious Monk Plays Duke Ellington

- Oscar Pettiford, bass
- Kenny Clarke, drums

Disc 1, tracks 9–13; disc 2, tracks 1–2: 17 March and 3 April 1956, Rudy Van Gelder Studio, Hackensack, NJ – see The Unique Thelonious Monk

- Oscar Pettiford, bass
- Art Blakey, drums

Disc 2, tracks 3–6, 8: 9 and 15 October 1956, Reeves Sound Studios, NYC – see Brilliant Corners

- Ernie Henry, alto saxophone
- Sonny Rollins, tenor saxophone
- Oscar Pettiford, bass
- Max Roach or Art Blakey, drums (sources are discrepant)

Disc 2, track 7: 7 December 1956, Reeves Sound Studios, NYC – see Brilliant Corners

- Clark Terry, trumpet
- Sonny Rollins, tenor saxophone
- Paul Chambers, bass
- Max Roach, drums

Disc 3, tracks 1–9; disc 4, tracks 1–3: 12 April 1957, Reeves Sound Studios, NYC – see Thelonious Himself

Disc 3, tracks 10–11: 16 April 1957, Reeves Sound Studios, NYC – see Thelonious Himself

- John Coltrane, tenor saxophone
- Wilbur Ware, bass

Disc 4, tracks 4–11; disc 5, tracks 1–5: 25–26 June 1957, Reeves Sound Studios, NYC – see Monk's Music,

- Ray Copeland, trumpet
- Gigi Gryce, alto saxophone
- John Coltrane, tenor saxophone
- Coleman Hawkins, tenor saxophone
- Wilbur Ware, bass
- Art Blakey, drums

Disc 13: 29 April 1960, The Blackhawk, San Francisco, CA – see Thelonious Monk at the Blackhawk

- Joe Gordon, trumpet
- Harold Land, tenor saxophone
- Charlie Rouse, tenor saxophone
- John Ore, bass
- Billy Higgins, drums
