= Thelonious Sphere Monk (disambiguation) =

Thelonious Sphere Monk (1917–1982) was an American jazz pianist.

Thelonious Sphere Monk or Thelonious Monk may also refer to:

- T. S. Monk or Thelonious Sphere Monk III (born 1949), son of Thelonious Monk
- Thelonious Sphere Monk: Dreaming of the Masters Series Vol. 2, a 1991 tribute album
- Thelonious Monk Institute of Jazz, a Washington, D.C. charity established 1986

== See also ==
- Thelonious, a given name
- Thelonious Monk discography, includes albums with "Thelonious Monk" in the title
