= Thelonious Monk Quintet Blows for LP =

Thelonious Monk Quintet Blows for LP (featuring Sonny Rollins)

Studio album by Thelonious Monk Quintet
- Released: 1954
- Recorded: November 13, 1953
- Studios: WOR Studios, New York City
- Genre: Jazz
- Length: 21:27
- Label: Prestige

Thelonious Monk 10-inch LP chronology
Thelonious (1953)	Thelonious Monk Quintet Blows for LP (featuring Sonny Rollins) (1954)	Thelonious Monk Quintet (1954)

Alternate cover
- Alternate cover and title for PrLP 166

Alternate cover
- PrEP 1352, consisting of Side B of this 10" LP.

Thelonious Monk Quintet Blows for LP (featuring Sonny Rollins) is a 10" LP by American jazz pianist and composer Thelonious Monk, performed by Monk's Quintet. It was originally released in 1954 as the second of five 10-inch LP albums by Monk for Prestige (PrLP 166). Its contents were later split between the two 12-inch albums Monk and Thelonious Monk and Sonny Rollins. It has rarely been re-released in its original format, although it was included in a boxed set by Craft Records in a limited edition in 2017.

Some copies of the album cover simply read Thelonious with Sonny Rollins.

The original title draws attention to the fact that this is the first time Monk took advantage of the potential extended playing time of the new "long playing" LP record. Each of the performances goes significantly past the playing time possible on a 10" 78 rpm single record. "Let's Call This" and "Think of One" were also placed back-to-back on a 45 rpm "Extended Play" (EP) record (PrEP 1352).

== Track listing ==
All compositions by Thelonious Monk, except where noted.

Side A:

1. "Friday the 13th" – 10:32

Side B:

2. "Let's Call This" - 5:08
3. "Think of One" [Take 2] - 5:47

Notes

- Recorded November 13, 1953
- Recording engineer: unknown, WOR Studios, New York City

== Personnel ==
- Thelonious Monk – piano
- Sonny Rollins – tenor saxophone
- Julius Watkins – french horn
- Percy Heath – bass
- Willie Jones – drums
