= Bad and Beautiful =

Studio album by Sun Ra and his Arkestra
- Released: 1972
- Recorded: 1961 New York
- Genre: Jazz
- Length: 30:57
- Label: Saturn; Impulse! Evidence
- Producer: Alton Abraham

Sun Ra and his Arkestra chronology
| The Futuristic Sounds of Sun Ra (1961) | Bad and Beautiful (1972) | Art Forms of Dimensions Tomorrow (1965) |

Professional ratings
Review scores
| Source | Rating |
|---|---|
| AllMusic | 4/5 stars |
| The Encyclopedia of Popular Music | 4/5 stars |

Bad and Beautiful is an album by the American jazz musician Sun Ra and his Arkestra. Recorded in 1961 in New York City at the Choreographers' Workshop, 414 W. 51st St., the album was the second to be recorded in New York by the Arkestra after leaving Chicago, but would remain unreleased until 1972. The album is considered to represent an important transition between the big band approach of the Chicago recordings, and the more 'outside' approach of Ra's smaller bands recorded later in the decade:

'Aside from "Exotic Two," the tunes are split between standards (apparently the last ones the group would record until the '70s) and blues originals, but there are indications of the direction the Arkestra would take throughout the '60s. "Search Light Blues" has some interesting percussion accents finding their way into the arrangement, and "Exotic Two" alludes more clearly to the percussion-heavy sound that dominated many of the '60s recordings. Sun Ra plays piano exclusively on this recording, and Gilmore gets lots of room to shine. A significant transitional LP, this is probably the last "inside" record the Arkestra would record as they forged new sonic paths into the mid-'60s.' Sean Westergaard, All Music Guide link

According to Ra's biographer, John F Szwed, the album announced that Ra was 'now in New York', with its inclusion of the theme music from the film The Bad and the Beautiful, and its Broadway show tunes And This Is My Beloved and Just In Time.

The record has been re-released by Impulse! in 1974, and again by Evidence in 1992, this time on a Compact Disc coupled with We Travel The Space Ways.

== Track listing ==
=== 12-inch vinyl ===
Side A:

1. "Bad and the Beautiful" (Previn, Raksin) - (2.46)
2. "Ankh" (Ra) - (5.11)
3. "Just in Time" (Styne, Comden, Green) - (3.49)
4. "Search Light Blues" (Ra) - (5.39)

Side B:

1. "Exotic Two" (Ra) - (4.47)
2. "On the Blue Side" (Ra) - (5.29)
3. "And This Is My Beloved" (Borodin, Wright, Forrest) - (3.16)

== Musicians ==
- Sun Ra - Piano
- Pat Patrick - Baritone sax, percussion
- John Gilmore - Tenor sax
- Marshall Allen - Alto sax, flute
- Ronnie Boykins - Bass
- Tommy Hunter - Drums, percussion

Recorded entirely at the Choreographer's Workshop, New York (the Arkestra's rehearsal space) in either November or December 1961.
