= Secrets of the Sun =

Studio album by Sun Ra and his Solar Arkestra
- Released: 1965
- Recorded: 1962, New York
- Genre: Jazz
- Length: 33:02 (LP); 50:37 (CD); 42:50 (digital)
- Label: Saturn; Atavistic
- Producer: Alton Abraham

Sun Ra and his Solar Arkestra chronology
| Art Forms of Dimensions Tomorrow (1961-62) | Secrets of the Sun (1965) | When Sun Comes Out (1963) |

Secrets of the Sun is an album by the American Jazz musician Sun Ra and his Solar Arkestra. The album is considered one of the more accessible recordings from his 'Solar' period. Originally released on Ra's own Saturn label in 1965, the record was unavailable for many years before being reissued on compact disc by Atavistic in 2008.

== Increasing free-form experimentation ==
The album is characterised by playful experimentation. Solar Symbols - a duo for percussion - used reverberation techniques that have since been considered an early foray into pure ambient music. Solar Differentials even featured an experimental 'Space Voice';

'Solar Differentials introduced Art Jenkins, a new "Space Vocalist". Jenkins had sought an audition with Sun Ra a few months before the recording, and sang some rhythm-and-blues tunes for him. Sonny told him that he had a nice voice, but what he was looking for was a singer who could do the impossible ("The possible has been tried and failed; now I want to try the impossible"). Art came back one day when they were recording at the Choreographer's Workshop, and dead set on getting on a record somehow, rummaged through a bag of miscellaneous instruments looking for something he could play. But every time he picked up something, someone in the band would tell him to leave it alone. When no one objected when he pulled a ram's horn from the bottom of the bag he began to sing into it, but backwards, with his mouth to the large opening, so that it gave out a weird sound which he made weirder by moving his hand over the small opening to alter the tone. Sonny broke out laughing, "Now that's impossible!" and asked him to improvise wordlessly on the record.' John F Szwed,

When reissued on compact disc, the record came with an extended 17 minute 'soloing tour de force', Flight To Mars.

== Critical reception ==
Professional ratings
Review scores
| Source | Rating |
|---|---|
| All About Jazz | 4/5 stars |
| AllMusic | 3.5/5 stars |
| DownBeat | 2/5 stars |

All About Jazz said, "Marking a transition in its development between the advanced swing of the early Chicago-era recordings and the increased free-form experimentation of its New York tenure, this album also reveals the first recorded versions of two Ra standards, "Friendly Galaxy" and "Love in Outer Space." Accessible, yet segueing into vanguard territory, this album highlights a fertile period in the Arkestra's history. Looser and more aggressive than its Chicago recordings, these pieces find the Arkestra pushing at the limits of harmony and tonality."

== Track listing ==
=== 12" Vinyl ===
All songs by Sun Ra
Side A:

1. "Friendly Galaxy" – (4:35)
2. "Solar Differentials" – (6:28)
3. "Space Aura" – (5:26)

Side B:

1. "Love in Outer Space" – (4:44)
2. "Reflects Motion" – (9:07)
3. "Solar Symbols" – (2:42)

=== CD reissue (2008) bonus track ===
7. "Flight to Mars" – (17:35)

=== Digital reissue (2014) ===
1. "Friendly Galaxy" – (4:51)
2. "Solar Differentials" – (6:22)
3. "Space Aura" – (5:12)
4. "Love in Outer Space" – (4:36)
5. "Reflects Motion, Pt. 1" [previously unreleased] – (3:21)
6. "Reflects Motion, Pt. 2" – (8:09)
7. "Reflects Motion, Pt. 3" [previously unreleased] – (2:34)
8. "Solar Symbols" – (2:34)
9. "Project Black Mass" [previously unreleased] – (5:07)

== Musicians ==
Note: track numbers refer to the 2014 digital reissue

- Sun Ra – Piano (1–9), Gong (1, 8), Sun Harp (8)
- John Gilmore – Bass Clarinet (1, 4), Space Bird Sounds (2), Tenor Sax (3, 5–7), Space Drums (4), Percussion (8)
- Marshall Allen – Flute (1, 5–7), Alto Saxophone (3), Morrow (4), Percussion (8)
- Pat Patrick – Flute (1), Baritone Saxophone (3), Space Drums (4), Percussion (8)
- Al Evans – Flugelhorn (1)
- Calvin Newborn – Electric Guitar (1)
- Art Jenkins – Space Voice (2)
- Eddie Gale – Trumpet (3)
- Ronnie Boykins – Bass (1–7)
- Tommy Hunter – Drums (1), Tape Effects (1–9), Space Bird Sounds (2)
- C. Scoby Stroman – Drums (2, 3, 5–7)
- Jimmy Johnson – Percussion (4)
- Unknown – Vocals (5)

Recorded at the Choreographer's Workshop, New York (the Arkestra's rehearsal space) in 1962 by Tommy Hunter. The same sessions are believed to have also yielded a number of songs released on The Invisible Shield and What's New?, two Saturn albums released a decade later that also contained songs recorded in the 1970s.
