= The Futuristic Sounds of Sun Ra =

Studio album by Sun Ra and his Arkestra
- Released: 1962
- Recorded: October 10, 1961 Newark, New Jersey
- Genre: Jazz
- Length: 41:51
- Label: Savoy
- Producer: Tom Wilson

Sun Ra and his Arkestra chronology
We Travel the Space Ways (1956)	The Futuristic Sounds of Sun Ra (1962)	Bad and Beautiful (1961)

The Futuristic Sounds of Sun Ra is the fourth studio album by the American jazz musician Sun Ra and his Arkestra, recorded on October 10, 1961, for the Savoy label and released in 1962.

The album was supervised by Tom Wilson.

== History ==
The Futuristic Sounds of Sun Ra is the first record to be recorded by a pared-down Arkestra after Sun Ra and the core of his group left Chicago and relocated to New York City.

According to Sun Ra's biographer John Szwed:

'The idea was just to play a few gigs, maybe some studio work, and then go back to Chicago and work at the Pershing [club] again. But as soon as they crossed the George Washington Bridge they collided with a taxi and bent one of the wheels of [bassist] Ronnie Boykins's father's car. With no money to have it fixed they were stranded again. [Sun Ra] went to a phone booth and called Ed Bland and Tom Wilson to tell them they were in town, and the band moved into a couple of hotel rooms over the Peppermint Lounge on 45th Street. But after a few days of waiting, Strickland and Mitchell got anxious, called home for money, and left. The five who remained then moved to a room on 81st Street between West End Avenue and Riverside Drive, and after a few days found a cheaper place farther downtown in the seventies.

'Though the band had no luck finding places to play, Tom Wilson came up with a recording session for them with Savoy Records. On October 10 they crossed the river to the Medallion Studio in Newark with a few musicians they added for the date... and they produced a record which could have easily represented their repertoire during an evening at a club there..... Despite a heavy title and a cover painting of a conga drum swirling like a tornado through a valley of piano keys against an orange sky, the record was plagued from the start. Tom Wilson's liner notes were filled with inaccuracies: Distribution was almost as poor as it was with the Saturn records, and there was no reviews for twenty-three years, when it was reissued in 1984 as We Are In The Future.'

== Critical reception ==
Professional ratings
Review scores
Source	Rating
AllMusic (LP)	4/5 stars
The Rolling Stone Jazz Record Guide	4/5 stars

The album is often considered one of the most accessible records in Ra's vast catalogue;

Sun Ra's only release for the Savoy label is a gem... Ra sticks to acoustic piano for the entire session, but various percussion instruments are dispersed throughout the band, giving a slightly exotic flavor to some of the tunes... With the exception of 'The Beginning', all the tunes are very accessible. This is one to play for the mistaken folks who think the Arkestra did nothing but make noise. Excellent.

== Artwork ==
The sleeve was designed by 'Harvey', a secretive graphic designer who made over 190 album covers for Savoy and its subsidiaries throughout the 1960s;

"Rev. Lawrence Roberts, long-time producer for Savoy Records... said that they never knew the identity of Harvey. Harvey lived in New York, and was very secretive. They would send him a title or concept and he would produce the painting. The paintings were not expensive, and they paid him in cash."

== Releases ==
The record was issued in France (year unknown) simply as Sun Ra by the label Concert Hall (catalogue number J-1348). It was reissued by Savoy in 1984 as We Are in the Future, but regained its original name when it was issued on Compact Disc in 1994. Savoy reissued it again in 2003.

== Track listing ==
All songs written by Sun Ra except 'China Gates'.
Side A:

1. Bassism - (4.07)
2. Of Sounds and Something Else - (2.54)
3. What's That? - (2.15)
4. Where Is Tomorrow? - (2.50)
5. The Beginning - (6.29)
6. China Gates (Victor Young) - (3.25)

Side B:

1. New Day - (5.51)
2. Tapestry from an Asteroid - (3.02)
3. Jet Flight - (3.15)
4. Looking Outward - (2.49)
5. Space Jazz Reverie - (4.54)

== Personnel ==
- Sun Ra – piano
- Bernard McKinney – trombone, euphonium
- Marshall Allen – alto sax, flute, 'morrow' (a Japanese shakuhachi with a Bb clarinet mouthpiece)
- John Gilmore – tenor sax, bass clarinet
- Pat Patrick – bass saxophone
- Ronnie Boykins – bass
- Willie Jones – drums
- Leah Ananda – conga
- Ricky Murray – vocals on "China Gates"
