= Art Forms of Dimensions Tomorrow =

Studio album by Sun Ra and his Solar Arkestra
- Released: 1965
- Recorded: 1961–1962, New York
- Genre: Jazz
- Length: 34:06
- Label: Saturn; Evidence
- Producer: Alton Abraham

Sun Ra and his Solar Arkestra chronology
Bad and Beautiful (1961)	Art Forms of Dimensions Tomorrow (1965)	Secrets of the Sun (1962)

Professional ratings
Review scores
Source	Rating
AllMusic	3/5 stars
The Encyclopedia of Popular Music	3/5 stars

Art Forms of Dimensions Tomorrow is an album by the American jazz musician Sun Ra and his Solar Arkestra. Often considered the first of Ra's 'outside' recordings, the album was the first to make extensive use of a discovery by the Arkestra's drummer and engineer Tommy Hunter:

'Art Forms of Dimensions Tomorrow.... contained "Cluster of Galaxies" and "Solar Drums", two rhythm section exercises with the sound treated with such strange reverberations that they threatened to obliterate the instruments' identity and turn the music into low-budget musique concrète. While testing the tape recorder when the musicians were tuning up one day, Hunter had discovered that if he recorded with the earphones on, he could run a cable from the output jack back into the input on the recorder and produce massive reverberation:

"I wasn't sure what Sun Ra would think of it... I thought he might be mad - but he loved it. It blew his mind! By working the volume of the output on the playback I could control the effect, make it fast or slow, drop it out, or whatever." [Tommy Hunter]

'By the 1950s commercial recording companies had developed a classical style of recording which assured that the recording process itself would be invisible... but Sun Ra began to regularly violate this convention on the Saturn releases by recording live at strange sites, by using feedback, distortion, high delay or reverb, unusual microphone placement, abrupt fades or edits, and any number of other effects or noises which called attention to the recording process. On some recordings you could hear a phone ringing, or someone walking near the microphone. It was a rough style of production, an antistyle, a self-reflexive approach which anticipates both free jazz recording conventions and punk production to come.' John F Szwed

The sleeve was designed by Sun Ra. When re-issued on compact disc by Evidence in 1992, the album was joined with the contemporaneous Cosmic Tones for Mental Therapy.

== Track listing ==
=== 12-inch vinyl ===
All songs by Sun Ra
Side A:

1. "Cluster of Galaxies" - (2.22)
2. "Ankh" - (6.08)
3. "Solar Drums" - (2.27)
4. "The Outer Heavens" - (4.47)

Side B:

1. "Infinity of the Universe" - (7.08)
2. "Lights on a Satellite" - (3.08)
3. "Kosmos in Blue" - (8.06)

== Musicians ==
- Sun Ra - Piano, Sun Harp, Gong, Percussion
- Manny Smith - Trumpet
- Clifford Thornton - Trumpet on Infinity of the Universe
- Ali Hassan - Trombone
- Pat Patrick - Baritone Sax, Percussion, Clarinet
- John Gilmore - Tenor Sax, Bass Clarinet, Percussion
- Marshall Allen - Alto Sax, Bells, Percussion
- Ronnie Boykins - Bass
- John Ore - Second Bass on Kosmos in Blue
- C. Scoby Stroman - Drums, Percussion
- Clifford Jarvis - Drums on Infinity of the Universe
- Tommy Hunter - Drums, Percussion on Cluster of Galaxies, Lights on a Satellite and Kosmos in Blue

Recorded at the Choreographer's Workshop, New York (the Arkestra's rehearsal space) in 1962, except "Lights on a Satellite" and "Kosmos in Blue", recorded in the same location in either November or December 1961.
