= France's Concert Records =

French jazz record label (a.k.a. Esoldun INA)

France's Concert Records was a 1980s independent French jazz and blues record label (also known as Esoldun INA) that is now defunct, that was set up by Esoldun to exploit the Institut National de l'Audiovisuel (INA)'s recording archives. Distribution was by Wotre Music.

== Partial discography ==
- FCD 101 – Earl Hines – Hine's Tune
- FCD 102 – Charles Mingus – Meditation
- FCD 103 – Milt Buckner – Play, Milt, Play
- FCD 104 – Coleman Hawkins – Lover Man
- FCD 105 – Thelonious Monk – Evidence
- FCD 106 – John Coltrane – Love Supreme
- FCD 107 – Bill Evans – Live In Paris, 1972 Vol. 1
- FCD 108 – Wes Montgomery – Live In Paris, 1965
- FCD 109 – Roland Kirk – Live In Paris, 1970, Vol. 1
- FCD 110 – Charles Mingus – Live In Paris, 1964, Vol. 2
- FCD 111 – Freddy King – Live In Antibes, 1974
- FCD 112 – Count Basie – Live In Antibes, 1968
- FCD 113 – Thelonious Monk – Thelonious Monk Nonet Live In Paris 1967
- FCD 114 – Bill Evans – Live In Paris, 1972, Vol. 2
- FCD 115 – Roland Kirk – Live In Paris, 1970, Vol. 2
- FCD 116 – Muddy Waters – Live In Antibes, 1974
- FCD 117 – Woody Herman – Live in Antibes, 1965
- FCD 118 – Sister Rosetta Tharpe – Live in Paris, 1964
- FCD 119 – John Coltrane – Live in Antibes, 1965
- FCD 120 – Stuff Smith – Live in Paris, 1965
- FCD 121 – Muddy Waters – Live in Paris, 1968
- FCD 122 – Mahalia Jackson – Live in Antibes, 1968
- FCD 123 – Chet Baker – Live in Paris, 1960–63 – Live in Nice, 1975
- FCD 124 – Sarane & Matelo Ferret – Tribute to Django
- FCD 125 – Bill Evans – Live in Paris, 1972, Vol. 3
- FCD 126 – Freddy King – Live in Nancy, 1975, Vol. 1
- FCD 127 – Memphis Slim – Live in Paris, 1963
- FCD 128 – Chet Baker – Live in Chateauvallon, 1978
- FCD 129 – Freddy King – Live in Nancy, 1975, Vol. 2
- FCD 130 – France's Concert – Anthology vol.1
- FCD 131 – Ben Webster – Live in Paris, 1972
- FCD 132 – Thelonious Monk – Live in Paris, 1964 (FCD 132x2/Double CD)
- FCF 133 – Arnett Cobb – Tiny Grimes Quintet – Live in Paris, 1974
- FCD 134 – Charles Mingus – Live in Chateauvallon, 1972
- FCD 135 – Thelonious Monk – Live in Paris, 1964 – Alhambra, Vol. 1
