= Thelonious =

Thelonious is a given name. Notable people with the name include:

- Fred Thelonious Baker (born 1960) English guitarist
- Thelonious "Thelo" Aasgaard (born 2002), English and Norwegian footballer
- Thelonious Bernard (born 1964) French actor
- Thelonious Martin (born 1992) or King Thelonious, American Hip Hop record producer
- Thelonious Monk (1917–82), American jazz pianist
  - Thelonious (composition), written by Monk
- Thelonious Sphere Monk III (born 1949), known as T. S. Monk, son of Thelonious Monk

== Characters ==
- Thelonious (Shrek), one of Lord Farquaad's henchmen in the film Shrek
- Thelonious Jagger 'TJ' Kippen, a character in the American television show Andi Mack
- Thelonious Jaha, a character in the American television show The 100
- Thelonius "Theo" Faron, the main character in the film Children of Men
- Thelonius "Monk" Ellison, the main character in the book Erasure and its film adaptation American Fiction

== See also ==
- Thelonious Monster, an American post-punk rock band
- Thelonious Sphere Monk (disambiguation)
