= Federico Ramos =

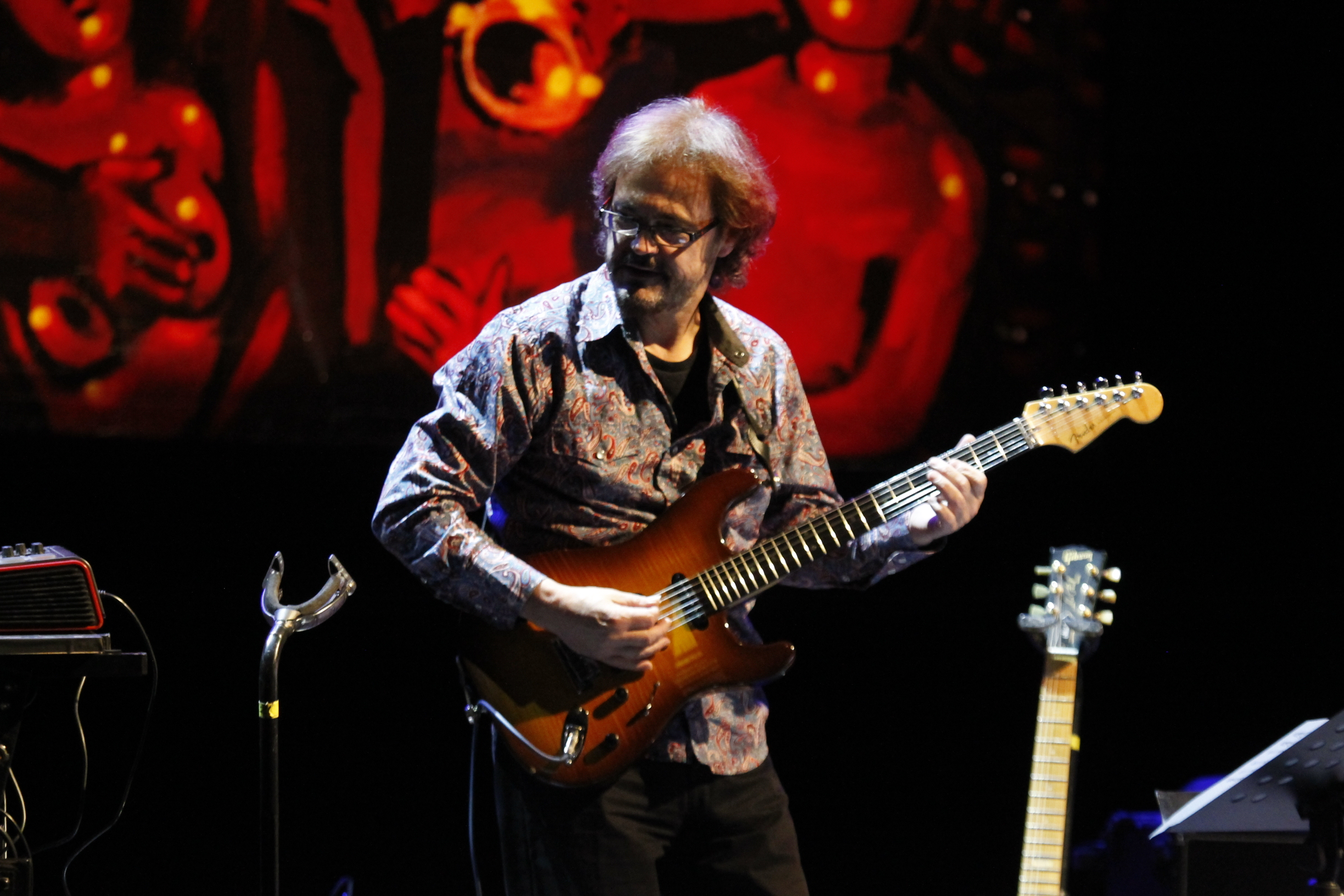

Background information
- Also known as: Freddy Ramos
- Born: November 17, 1953 (age 72); Treinta y Tres, Uruguay
- Genres: World; Jazz; Flamenco; Latin jazz; Rock & roll
- Website: FedericoRamos.com

Federico "Freddy" Ramos is a Uruguayan guitarist, arranger, producer and composer based in Santa Monica, California.

He began his career playing with Eduardo Mateo and Uruguayan rock bands Psiglo and Dias de Blues. He is credited with incorporating jazz, blues and rock influences to urban Uruguayan music as it is ascertained in the book "De las Cuevas al Solís" by Fernando Peláez. Federico later moved to southern Spain and eventually to Los Angeles where he is a specialty studio musician. He has shared stage, collaborated with, or recorded for artists Andy Williams, Dr. Yusef Lateef, Jon Anderson, Milton Nascimento, Ray Brown Jr., Freddie Hubbard, Cheb Mami, Joan Sebastian, Alejandro Fernández, Vicente Fernández, Jon Hassell, Mark Isham, Elton John, James Moody, Terry Plumeri, Alphonso Johnson, Chester Thompson, and Dionne Warwick. Federico has participated in many films and television shows along films composers such as Hans Zimmer, John Powell, James Horner, Germaine Franco, Danny Elfman and Michael Giacchino.

== Biography ==
Born in the big town Treinta y Tres, Uruguay, Federico began his studies in Montevideo, capital of the country. The musical roots of his ancestors first directed him to the Southern Coast of Spain and while residing in Sevilla and Jeréz de la Frontera Federico was involved with flamenco music. Nevertheless, he formally studied classical guitar at the Real Conservatorio de Madrid during the five-year residency. Formal studies were continued first at the Berklee College of Music in Massachusetts and later in California at the Guitar Institute of Technology (MI). In Valencia, at the California Institute of the Arts, he was the recipient of full scholarships. In due course Federico obtained a bachelor's degree in Fine Arts and taught a course on Cross-Cultural Improvisation at the California Institute of the Arts.

When Federico arrived in the United States in 1980, soon began expanding his musical and cultural spectrum. He settled in Santa Monica. In the eighties Federico co-founded Eternal Wind, a band whose music style was characterized by improvisational compositions of world sounds. Eternal Wind Dr. Charles Moore, Adam Rudolph, Ralphs Jones and Federico, recorded several albums that were released by the Chicago-based Flying Fish Records Co.. Soon, Eternal Wind toured extensively with Dr.Yusef Lateef, who then wrote and composed two symphonic works intended to be performed and recorded by Eternal Wind. One of them, The African-American Epic Suite for Quintet and Orchestra was recorded in Germany with the Köln Radio Orchestra in 1993, and released in Europe by ACT Records. As a member of Eternal Wind, Federico also participated in the recording of Metamusic, also written and conducted by Dr. Lateef exclusively for his quartet. Later on, in 1995, the work The World at Peace of Yusef Lateef and Adam Rudolph (Eternal Wind) performed by 12 musicians, was released by Meta Records. This live performance at the Jazz Bakery of Los Angeles features Federico playing acoustic, electric and midi guitars throughout the session as well as his performance of percussion instruments and African kudu horn. References to Lateef and Eternal Wind association are further explored in Yusef Lateef's autobiography The Gentle Giant.

In 1990, Federico Ramos, Eduardo Márquez Del Signore and Bernardo Rubaja worked in a debuting ensemble of compositions and performances. The ensemble fused ancient folk traditions of South America with an array of influences spanning jazz, pop, avant-garde and classical music. The instrumental textures and harmonic tints of their native cultures offered a unique and personalized style. Their recorded work Newland, was released by Narada Productions, featuring Mark Isham on trumpet, Alex Acuña on drums and percussion and Steve Fowler on flutes. In 1991, Federico was introduced to the Englishman and pioneer artist Jon Anderson of the legendary progressive rock group "Yes", with whom he recorded. Subsequently, the Windham Hill releases of Deseo, Toltec, The Best Of Jon Anderson-South America 1993 and Deseo Remixes followed. Federico toured as lead guitarist on Jon's Latin American tour of nine countries in 1993. In Belo Horizonte, Brazil, Federico was guest guitarist performing with Milton Nascimento, Simone and James Taylor, for a benefit presentation in the fight against hunger, Natal Sem Fome (Christmas Without Hunger).

Later, the Uruguayan drummer José Luis Pérez joined Federico to create Pérez & Ramos. Their work Flip Flop expressed a contemporary improvisational music based primarily on the Uruguayan rhythms of candombe and African rhythms blending tango, Brazilian melodies and jazz. Pérez & Ramos' Flip Flop was well-reviewed after being released by World Alchemy Records in February 1994. During the year 1994, Federico was co-producer on the project Heart of Brazil with Dionne Warwick in the recording of Brazilian artist Eliana Estevão.

During those years, Ramos co-founded the group Hecho en México with musicians Luis Pérez Ixoneztly and Germaine Franco (with whom now he collaborates for film scores). Hecho en México's music was a junction of pre-Columbian sounds of instruments and language with other contemporary musical expressions.

North Star released Calido's Tropical Nights in the year 1994. The duet of Federico and guitarist Ramón Stagnaro featured melodic songs with an array of exotic rhythms of Latin and Spanish compositions. Soon followed the collaboration with Michael Feinstein Michael & George: Feinstein Sings Gershwin, which was nominated for a Grammy. The Savage Rose's disc For Your Love was granted the Gold Sales Award in Denmark in 2002. The recording of "En Vivo Desde el Auditorio Nacional" with Mexican superstar Joan Sebastian was awarded the Grammy for the 2006 best live disc. Also released in 2006 was a DVD of the Latin American Tour with Jon Anderson. For 2007, an educational disc for DW drums under the guide of Alex Acuña includes a vast array of Latin American styles.

In 1995 Federico again joined with Uruguayan drummer José Luis Pérez and Uruguayan bassist Eduardo Márquez Del Signore (Jon Anderson's Latin Band). The Trio found in the combination of their sounds the name of Ritual and the compact disc Presencia was released by Amazone Records. Presencia was presented in Montevideo, in the Teatro Solís in July 1997 with sold out tickets. Ritual traveled to Montevideo accompanied by their guest artist, pianist, composer and producer Tommy Eyre, the Englishman that had arranged Joe Cocker's version of A Little Help From My Friends. From 1996, Federico engaged in different work projects, collaborations and special guest performances. Among these musical productions Federico's highlighted participations are: Cielo y Tierra: Heaven and Earth, Warner-México 1996, with Jon Anderson, performing acoustic guitars and choirs; putoInternational Inc. 1997, guest guitarist; Adam Rudolph's Moving Pictures: Contemplations, Meta Records 1997, acoustic guitars, charango, oud, bamboo flutes; Cayambe: Influences, Andes Inc. 1997, guitars; Cayambe: America, Andes Inc. 1998, guitars; Heart & Soul, North Sound Music Group 1999, flamenco guitarists (with individual performances also by Ramón Stagnaro and Adam Del Monte), soloist guitars, composer and arranger.

During the early months of 1997, Sony Music contracted Federico as producer of Alexis Peña's recording project. For this occasion Federico convoked the participation of renowned musicians such as Alex Acuña and Alphonso Johnson ("Weather Report"), Alex Ligertwood ("Santana") and Tommy Eyre (B.B. King, George Michael, Gary Moore). In February 2001 The African-American Epic Suite by Dr. Yusef Lateef with the Detroit Symphony Orchestra.

For over a decade, Federico toured with famed, multi-Grammy award winner Mexican singer Joan Sebastian throughout Mexico, Guatemala, El Salvador, and the U.S.. In 2016 and 2017, Federico toured with The Alphonso Johnson Band, feat. the maestro Chester Thompson in Chicago, and throughout Argentina and Uruguay, where he also taught clinics. He is a dedicated studio musician collaborating in recordings, and music for films and TV shows.

Ramos was the guitarist for the animated Disney Coco, and performed the Academy winning song, "Remember Me," at the 90th Academy Awards. He subsequently was invited to perform "Dos Oruguitas," nominated for Best Original Song at the 94th Oscars. In addition, he is part of the Live to Film series of Disney and Symphony Orchestras in the US and around the world.

== Film collaborations ==
IMDb
