= Thelonious Monk and Sonny Rollins =

Studio album by Thelonious Monk
- Released: 1957
- Recorded: November 13, 1953; September 22, 1954; October 25, 1954
- Studio: WOR, NYC, and Van Gelder, Hackensack, NJ
- Genre: Jazz
- Length: 34:02
- Label: Prestige
- Producer: Bob Weinstock, Ira Gitler

Thelonious Monk chronology
| Monk (1956) | Thelonious Monk and Sonny Rollins (1957) | Thelonious Monk Plays Duke Ellington (1956) |

Professional ratings
Review scores
| Source | Rating |
|---|---|
| AllMusic | 4.5/5 stars |
| DownBeat | 3/5 stars |
| MSN Music (Expert Witness) | A |
| The Penguin Guide to Jazz Recordings | 3.5/4 stars |
| The Rolling Stone Jazz Record Guide | 5/5 stars |

Thelonious Monk and Sonny Rollins is a compilation album by jazz pianist and composer Thelonious Monk and saxophonist Sonny Rollins released in 1956 by Prestige Records. The tracks on it were recorded in three sessions between 1953 and 1954. While this is its original title, and its most consistent title in its digital re-releases, it was also released on Prestige as Work! (1959, PRLP 7169) and The Genius of Thelonious Monk (1967, PR 7656), with alternative covers.

== Background ==
The album is culled from the results of three recording sessions over a span of close to twelve months featuring different personnel. Although Rollins is credited as a co-leader on the album cover, he appears on only three of the album's five tracks. It was the final Monk release on Prestige before he moved to a contract with Riverside Records.

The track "Friday the 13th" was recorded in November 1953 with a quintet of Monk, Rollins, Julius Watkins, Percy Heath, and Willie Jones; the September 1954 recordings are of a trio with Monk, Heath, and Art Blakey; and the October 1954 session Monk and Rollins again with bassist Tommy Potter and drummer Art Taylor. Of the three Monk originals, "Friday the 13th" was written in the studio during the recording session, released as a ten-minute jam to fill out the album's running time. Monk would return to "Nutty" again and again through his career, but this was his only recording of the composition "Work."

The recordings on this 12" LP originally appeared in 1954 on three 10" LPs: Thelonious Monk Quintet Blows for LP (Prestige PRLP 166), Thelonious Monk Plays (Prestige PRLP 189) and Sonny Rollins and Thelonious Monk (Prestige PRLP 190).

Chris Sheridan, in his book Brilliant Corners: A Bio-discography of Thelonious Monk, dates the first 12-inch vinyl release of Thelonious Monk and Sonny Rollins (Prestige PRLP 7075) to 1956. Its release was immediately preceded in the Prestige 12-inch catalog of Monk's work by Thelonious Monk Trio (Prestige PRLP 7027), and Thelonious Monk, aka Monk (PRLP 7053).

== Track listing ==
All compositions by Thelonious Monk, except where indicated.

Side one

1. "The Way You Look Tonight" (Dorothy Fields, Jerome Kern) – 5:13
2. "I Want to Be Happy" (Irving Caesar, Vincent Youmans) – 7:43
3. "Work" – 5:18

Side two

4. "Nutty" – 5:16
5. "Friday the 13th" – 10:32

Notes

- Tracks 1–4 recorded at Rudy Van Gelder Studio in Hackensack, NJ.
- Tracks 1 and 2 recorded on October 25, 1954, and originally released in sequence as Side A of the 10" LP Sonny Rollins and Thelonious Monk (Prestige PRLP 190)
- Tracks 3 and 4 recorded on September 22, 1954, and originally released in sequence as Side A of the 10" LP Thelonious Monk Plays (Prestige PRLP 189)
- Track 5 recorded on November 13, 1953, at WOR Studios, New York City, and originally released as Side A of Thelonious Monk Quintet Blows for LP (Prestige PRLP 166)

== Personnel ==
- Thelonious Monk – piano
- Sonny Rollins – tenor saxophone on "The Way You Look Tonight", "I Want to Be Happy" and "Friday the 13th"
- Julius Watkins – french horn on "Friday the 13th"
- Percy Heath – bass on "Work," "Nutty" and "Friday the 13th"
- Tommy Potter – bass on "The Way You Look Tonight" and "I Want to Be Happy"
- Art Taylor – drums on "The Way You Look Tonight" and "I Want to Be Happy"
- Art Blakey – drums on "Work" and "Nutty"
- Willie Jones – drums on "Friday the 13th"
