= Jennifer Leitham =

American musician

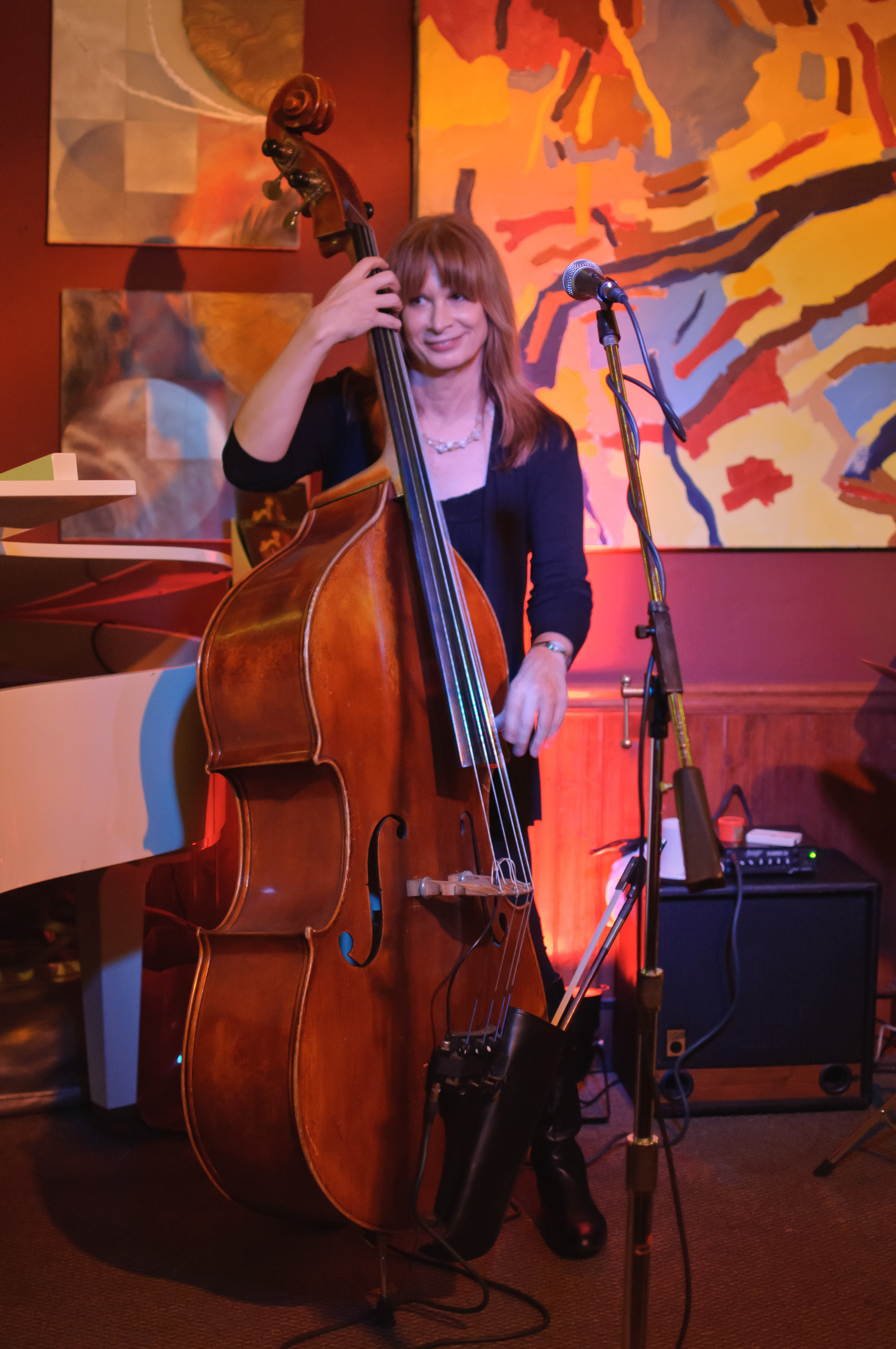
- Jennifer Leitham performing in March 2012 in Sierra Madre, California
- Born: August 10, 1953 (age 72); Illinois, United States
- Musical career
- Genres: Jazz
- Occupations: Singer, bassist
- Instruments: Vocals, bass
- Years active: 1972–present
- Website: www.jenniferleitham.com

Jennifer Jane Leitham (born John Leitham, August 10, 1953) is an American musician and double bass player. Being left-handed, she has also used the nicknames "Lefty" or "The Southpaw."

== Career ==
Her first musical influences included The Beatles and the music of Vince Guaraldi from the Peanuts holiday cartoons. She started performing in high school when she joined the chorus, revealing an aptitude for music. Her first music teacher was Al Stauffer and her music education grew thanks to the mentorship of some of the giants of the bass world, such as Milt Hinton, George Duvivier, and Slam Stewart.

An active live performer, Leitham has been bassist on more than 125 recordings including ten of her own. She is known for long associations with Mel Torme and Doc Severinsen. She has also appeared with Woody Herman, George Shearing, Gerry Mulligan, Peggy Lee, Joe Pass, Cleo Laine, Louis Bellson, Pete Rugolo, Bill Watrous, k.d. lang, Take 6, Milcho Leviev, Jon Hendricks, Annie Ross, Bob Dorough, Eartha Kitt and been a member of The Tonight Show All-Stars, The Woody Herman Thundering Herd, the Benny Carter Quintet, and the Bob Cooper Quartet.

Leitham own recordings include Leitham Up, The Southpaw, Lefty Leaps In, Live! and Two for the Road (a duo with guitarist Jimmy Bruno). Her 2006 release, The Real Me, features her original compositions and arrangements and, for the first time, her singing voice. Additionally 2008's critically acclaimed Left Coast Story, the 2011 release of a live DVD The Real Me Live, her 2014 release Future Christmas, and her 2015 release "MOOD(S)WINGS". Also, the Mood(S)wings album was voted one of the Top 3 CDs of 2015 by the readers of "JazzEd" magazine. Her observations on the events of the day were reflected in her 2019 release Remnants Of Humanity.

== Personal life ==
In 2001, Leitham transitioned from being known as John Leitham.

== Documentary ==
Leitham is the subject of a documentary, "I Stand Corrected".

== Discography ==
=== As John Leitham ===
- Leitham Up (1992)
- The Southpaw (1994)
- Lefty Leaps In (1996)
- Live (1998)
- Two For the Road with Jimmy Bruno (2000)

=== As Jennifer Leitham ===
- Two For the Road (2005) re-release
- The Real Me (2006)
- Left Coast Story (2008)
- The Real Me Live [MP3] (2011)
- The Real Me Live [DVD] (2011)
- Future Christmas (2014)
- Mood(S)wings (2015)
- Remnants of Humanity (2019)
