= Sonny Rollins and Thelonious Monk =

Sonny Rollins and Thelonious Monk [Quartet]

Studio album by Thelonious Monk and Sonny Rollins Quartet
- Released: 1954
- Recorded: October 25, 1954
- Studios: Rudy Van Gelder Studio, Hackensack, NJ
- Genre: Jazz
- Label: Prestige

Thelonious Monk 10-inch LP chronology
| Thelonious Monk Plays (1954) | Sonny Rollins and Thelonious Monk [Quartet] (1954) | Piano Solo (1954) |

Sonny Rollins and Thelonious Monk [Quartet] is a 10" LP by American jazz pianist and composer Thelonious Monk, performed by a quartet featuring Rollins and Monk. It was originally released in 1954 as the fifth of five 10" LPs featuring Monk for Prestige (PrLP 190). (The word "Quartet" appeared in the title only on the label.) Its contents were later split between the two 12-inch albums Thelonious Monk and Sonny Rollins and the Sonny Rollins album Moving Out. It has rarely been re-released in its original format, although it was included in a limited edition boxed set by Craft Records in 2017.

== Track listing ==
Side A:

1. "The Way You Look Tonight" (As "The Way You Blow Tonight") (Dorothy Fields, Jerome Kern) – 5:13
2. "I Want to Be Happy" (Irving Caesar, Vincent Youmans) – 7:43

Side B:

3. "More Than You Know" (Edward Eliscu, Billy Rose, Vincent Youmans) - 10:48

Notes

- Recorded at Rudy Van Gelder Studio in Hackensack, NJ, on October 25, 1954.

== Personnel ==
- Sonny Rollins – tenor saxophone
- Thelonious Monk – piano
- Tommy Potter – bass
- Art Taylor – drums
