= Steve Barta =

American-Brazilian pianist and composer (born 1953)

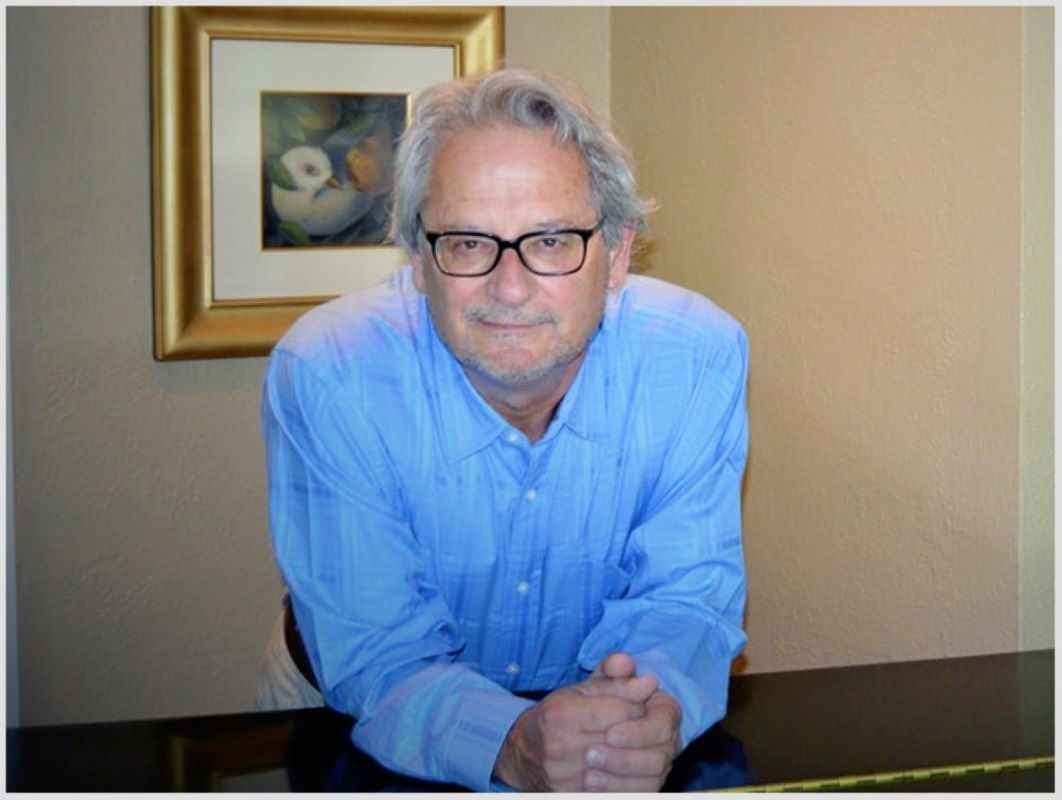
Photo of Barta

Steve Barta (December 25, 1953) is an American Jazz pianist, author, educator, composer, arranger, producer.

== Life and career ==
Barta has performed his original works as a solo artist, and with jazz ensembles and symphony orchestras. As a member of Herbie Mann and Jasil Brazz featuring Steve Barta, Barta recorded his widely acclaimed Blue River with this New York based ensemble – an original collection of his Brazilian compositions. His discography includes 15 recordings that reflect his many influences, particularly Brazilian, jazz and classical. Barta has released fifteen recordings to date. Some of his musical collaborations include Al Jarreau, Hubert Laws, Herbie Mann, Dori Caymmi, B.B. King, Dee Dee Bridgewater, Paulinho DaCosta, Ricardo Silveira, Kim Stone, Ricky Sebastian, Lee Trees and many more. He holds a coveted Grammy Award nomination for his Jumpin’ Jazz Kids – an original storyline and collection of jazz compositions written for jazz ensemble and orchestra, along with his co-writer Mark Oblinger.

Barta’s latest orchestral work is his arrangement of Claude Bolling’s famous, Suite for Flute & Jazz Piano. Now titled, Symphonic Arrangement: Suite for Flute & Jazz Piano, Bolling himself gave his personal approval to Steve’s work, “A thousand bravos! A true and modern arrangement. Brilliant!”. This recording also features flutist Hubert Laws and pianist Jeff Biegel. Barta is a music educator with over 35 years of experience teaching intermediate to advanced students, educators, and professional musicians. He is the author of The Source (Hal Leonard Publishing, Zenon Japan) and has published several books of his arrangements. Barta's latest single with flutist Hubert Laws and guitarist Lee Trees, Ascended, is available online. Barta is a Steinway Artist, as well as instructor of jazz piano at the Colorado College.
