= Trudy Silver =

American jazz pianist and composer (born 1953)

- Born: April 24, 1953 (age 73); New Britain, Connecticut, U.S.
- Genres: Jazz, avant-garde jazz, free jazz
- Occupation: Musician
- Instrument: piano
- Years active: 1979–present
- Website: www.trudysilver.com

Trudy Silver (born April 24, 1953) is an American jazz pianist and composer.

== Life ==
Born and raised in New Britain, Connecticut, she started playing piano at age 7, often practicing on her aunt's seven-foot Mason & Hamlin concert grand piano. Silver studied composition and music appreciation with Armin Loos before moving to Berkeley, California in January 1971.

It was while in California that she first heard Sun Ra, Ravi Shankar, and Alice Coltrane in a concert at the University of California and she taught herself chords and harmony. She returned to Connecticut in June 1971 and started playing in local bands. In 1979 she moved to Montreal, Quebec, Canada. A member of the Montreal Musicians' Union, she worked extensively in Montreal and around Quebec. In 1981 Silver moved to New York City.

Her work includes the political multimedia composition Where's the Outrage, a combination of music, Butoh mime by Sanae Buck and film which was included in the 2016 Dissident Arts Festival, as well as other events. She is an activist, and is also involved in political actions, and made the Village Voice "Honor Roll" of "the 1,793 people arrested during the week of the 2004 Republican National Convention."

She co-founded the 5C Cultural Center & Café on the Lower East Side of Manhattan with her husband, Bruce Morris. Together they have produced over 400 events since 1995.

== Discography ==
- Heroes/Heroines (1987)
- Silver Plays featuring Will Connell (1992)
- Damn the Rules! (2002)

== Bibliography ==
- "Guantánamo NY Blues 2004", And Then, Volume 13, 2007 (ISSN 1520-4111)
