= Willie Jones (drummer) =

American jazz drummer

William Jones Jr. (October 20, 1929 – April 1991) was a jazz drummer. He is known for playing and recording with Thelonious Monk, Lester Young, Elmo Hope, and Charles Mingus.

== Biography ==
Jones was born in New York on October 20, 1929. He mainly taught himself to play the drums, and played left handed. He played and recorded with pianist Thelonious Monk in 1953, including on the album Thelonious Monk and Sonny Rollins. This recording, on November 13, was Jones' first. He also appeared with Monk on the television program The Tonight Show, on June 10, 1955. Jones was sideman for another pianist's recording in 1955 – Elmo Hope's Meditations; and for Randy Weston's The Modern Art of Jazz by Randy Weston in the following year. In 1956 Jones had a two-week engagement with Monk in Philadelphia. Jones also played with Kenny Dorham, J. J. Johnson, Charlie Parker, and Cecil Payne in the mid-1950s.

In 1955–56 Jones was part of Charles Mingus' Jazz Workshop, and was the drummer in the bassist's band that recorded Pithecanthropus Erectus, which helped develop a freer form of group improvisation. Jones was tenor saxophonist Lester Young's drummer from late 1956 to early 1959. In 1961, Jones played on Sun Ra's The Futuristic Sounds of Sun Ra. After this, nothing is known about Jones, and his date of death was taken from social security records. These associations – with the traditional Young and the avant-garde Sun Ra – illustrated Jones' versatility.

== Discography ==
=== As sideman ===
Year recorded	Leader	Title	Label
1953	Thelonious Monk	Monk	Prestige
1953	Thelonious Monk	Thelonious Monk and Sonny Rollins	Prestige
1955	Elmo Hope	Meditations	Prestige
1955	Charles Mingus	Mingus at the Bohemia	Debut
1956	Randy Weston	The Modern Art of Jazz by Randy Weston	Dawn
1956	Charles Mingus	Pithecanthropus Erectus	Atlantic
1961	Sun Ra	The Futuristic Sounds of Sun Ra	Savoy
