= Jimmy Bruno =

American jazz guitarist

- Born: July 22, 1953 (age 73); Philadelphia, Pennsylvania, U.S.
- Genres: Jazz
- Occupation: Musician
- Instrument: Guitar
- Years active: 1972–2025
- Label: Concord Jazz
- Website: www.youtube.com/@JimmyBrunoJazz

James Michael Bruno (born July 22, 1953) is an American jazz guitarist from Philadelphia.

== Biography ==
Born in Philadelphia, Bruno started playing guitar at the age of 7. He began his professional career at the age of 19, touring with Buddy Rich. He played for many years in Los Angeles before returning to Philadelphia.

He counts as influences Johnny Smith, Hank Garland, Joe Pass, Tal Farlow, Wes Montgomery, Howard Roberts, Jim Hall, and Pat Martino.

In March 2011, he opened Jimmy Bruno's Guitar Workshop, a web site that allows students to learn from him through video lessons. A student can watch videos of Bruno teaching, record a video, and then send it to him for his review.

== Discography ==
=== As leader ===
- Sleight of Hand (Concord Jazz, 1992)
- Burnin' (Concord Jazz, 1994)
- Concord Jazz Guitar Collective with Howard Alden & Frank Vignola (Concord Jazz, 1995)
- Like That with Joey DeFrancesco (Concord Jazz, 1996)
- Live at Birdland (Concord Jazz, 1997)
- Full Circle with Howard Alden (Concord Jazz, 1998)
- Live at Birdland II (Concord Jazz, 1999)
- Polarity with Joe Beck (Concord Jazz, 2000)
- Two For the Road with Jennifer Leitham (CD Baby, 2000; re-release: Azica, 2005)
- Midnight Blue (Concord Jazz, 2001)
- Solo (Mel Bay, 2004)
- Maplewood Avenue with Tony Miceli & Jeff Pedras (Affiliated Artists, 2007)

=== As sideman ===
- Pixanne, Bloop or Blink (Pixanne, 1975)
- Tommy Tedesco, Carnival Time (Trend, 1985)
- Tommy Tedesco, Fine Fretted Friend (Discovery, 1992)
- Jack Wilkins, Heading North (String Jazz, 2001)

== Selected bibliography ==
- Art of Picking, Mel Bay
- Six Essential Fingerings for the Jazz Guitarist
- No Nonsense Jazz Guitar (Hot Licks Video, DVD)
- Inside Outside Jazz Guitar (Hot Licks Video, DVD)
