= Monk (1956 album) =

- Original LP cover

Studio album by Thelonious Monk
- Released: 1956
- Recorded: November 13, 1953 and May 11, 1954
- Genre: Jazz
- Length: 38:00
- Label: Prestige

Thelonious Monk chronology
Thelonious Monk Trio (1954/1956)	Monk (1956)	Thelonious Monk and Sonny Rollins (1956)

Alternate cover
- 1958 Reid Miles artwork and title (with decorative handwriting by Julia Warhola) used on most contemporary reissues

Monk (Prestige PRLP 7053) is a 1956 compilation album by jazz pianist and composer Thelonious Monk, featuring material recorded from 1953 to 1954 for the Prestige label and performed by Monk with two quintets, one featuring Julius Watkins, Sonny Rollins, Percy Heath, and Willie Jones and one featuring Ray Copeland, Frank Foster, Curly Russell, and Art Blakey. It was originally titled both Thelonious Monk [on its 1956 cover] and Thelonious Monk Quintets [on its labels] (PRLP 7053). Over the following decade, it was also re-released as Wee See (PRLP 7245) and The Golden Monk (PRST 7363) The most common cover art (with the Monk title), is 1958 revision, designed by Reid Miles.

== Background ==
Most of the recordings on this album first appeared on two 10" LPs: Thelonious Monk Quintet Blows for LP (Prestige PrLP 166) and Thelonious Monk Quintet (with Frank Foster, Art Blakey) (Prestige PrLP 180), both released in 1954. (This LP release added an additional take of "Think of One.")

Chris Sheridan, in his book Brilliant Corners: A Bio-discography of Thelonious Monk, dates the first 12-inch vinyl release of the album—Thelonious Monk (Prestige PRLP 7053)—to 1956. Its release was preceded in the Prestige 12-inch catalog of Monk's work by Thelonious Monk Trio (Prestige PRLP 7027), and followed by Thelonious Monk and Sonny Rollins (Prestige PRLP 7075).

== Reception ==
Professional ratings
Review scores
Source	Rating
AllMusic	4/5 stars
The Penguin Guide to Jazz Recordings	3.5/4 stars

AllMusic's Scott Yanow states, "Every Thelonious Monk recording is well worth getting although this one is not quite essential".

== Track listing ==
All compositions by Thelonious Monk except as indicated

Side 1

1. "We See" – 5:16
2. "Smoke Gets in Your Eyes" (Otto Harbach, Jerome Kern ) – 4:34
3. "Locomotive" – 6:23
4. "Hackensack" – 5:13

Side 2

1. "Let's Call This" – 5:08
2. "Think of One" [Take 2] – 5:47
3. "Think of One" [Take 1] – 5:37

Notes

- Side 1 recorded at Rudy Van Gelder Studio in Hackensack, NJ, on May 11, 1954, and originally released in sequence as the 10" LP Thelonious Monk Quintet (with Frank Foster, Art Blakey) (Prestige PrLP 180)
- Side 2 recorded at WOR Studios, New York City, on November 13, 1953. Tracks B1 and B2 originally released as one side of 10" LP Thelonious Monk Quintet Blows For LP, Featuring Sonny Rollins (Prestige PrLP 166), and as 7" PrEP 1352. Track B3 previously unreleased.

== Personnel ==
- Thelonious Monk – piano
- Ray Copeland – trumpet (tracks 1–4)
- Frank Foster – tenor saxophone (tracks 1–4)
- Curly Russell – bass (tracks 1–4)
- Art Blakey – drums (tracks 1–4)
- Julius Watkins – French horn (tracks 5–7)
- Sonny Rollins – tenor saxophone (tracks 5–7)
- Percy Heath – bass (tracks 5–7)
- Willie Jones – drums (tracks 5–7)
