= Thelonious Monk Nonet Live in Paris 1967 =

Live album by Thelonious Monk
- Released: 1988
- Recorded: November 3, 1967
- Genre: Jazz
- Length: 45:58
- Label: France's Concert
- Producer: Alexandre Noble, Joël Arlot, Etienne Lacoste

Thelonious Monk chronology
Live In Paris, Volume 3 (1967)	Thelonious Monk Nonet Live in Paris 1967 (1988)	Straight, No Chaser (1967)

Thelonious Monk Nonet Live In Paris 1967 is a live jazz album by Thelonious Monk on France's Concert Records LP FC-113, released in 1988.

Recorded at "Salle Pleyel", Paris, France, November 3, 1967, Thelonious Monk Nonet Live in Paris is a concert recording of a rare large group that Monk assembled for the European tour, which featured the addition of some of the top horn players in jazz.

== Criticism ==
Professional ratings
Review scores
Source	Rating
AllMusic	4/5 stars
The Penguin Guide to Jazz Recordings	3/4 stars

Jazz critic Scott Yanow called the album "a rare recording (of a large group) making it a historical curiosity; more importantly the music (featuring six originals) is excellent."

== Background ==
Monk organized this concert in an unusual way. The musicians joined the original quartet by coming on one by one to join in.

== Track listing ==
1. "Epistrophy" (Monk, Clarke) – 9:45
2. "Oska-T" (Monk) – 15:19
3. "Evidence" (Monk) – 14:24
4. "Blue Monk" (Monk) – 5:10
5. "Epistropy (reprise)" (Monk, Clarke) – 1:20

=== CD Reissue ===
The CD reissue of this LP (titled "The Nonet –Live") is also a French release, on the label “Le Jazz”, item number — CD 7. The release date was Nov 10, 1993 and it contains two additional tracks with a running length of 67:37

1. "Ruby, My Dear" (Monk) – 7:40
2. "We See" (Monk) – 13:59
3. "Epistrophy" (Monk, Clarke) – 9:45
4. "Oska-T" (Monk) – 15:19
5. "Evidence" (Monk) – 14:24
6. "Blue Monk" (Monk) – 5:10
7. "Epistropy (reprise)" (Monk, Clarke) – 1:20

== Personnel ==
- Thelonious Monk - piano
- Charlie Rouse – tenor sax
- Larry Gales – bass
- Ben Riley – drums
- Ray Copeland - trumpet
- Johnny Griffin – tenor sax
- Jimmy Cleveland – trombone
- Phil Woods – alto sax
- Clark Terry – trumpet

== Production ==
- Alexandre Noble, Joël Arlot, Etienne Lacoste: Coordination
- Michel Noble: Cover – interpretation of “Les petits chevaux jaunes” by Franz Marc
- Jacques Chesnel: Artistic collaboration
- Francis Paudras: Photography
- Frank Dufour, Gilbert Taïeb: Montage
- Francis Paudras: Cover concept
- Yves Builly, Monique Vaysse: Research
- Acknowledgements/Appreciation to André Francis
