= Thelonious Monk Plays =

Thelonious Monk Plays (with Percy Heath and Art Blakey)

Studio album by Thelonious Monk Trio
- Released: 1954
- Recorded: September 22, 1954
- Studios: Rudy Van Gelder Studio, Hackensack
- Genre: Jazz
- Label: Prestige

Thelonious Monk 10-inch LP chronology
Thelonious Monk Quintet (1954)	Thelonious Monk Plays (with Percy Heath and Art Blakey) (1954)	Sonny Rollins and Thelonious Monk (1954)

Thelonious Monk Plays (with Percy Heath and Art Blakey) is a 10" LP by American jazz pianist and composer Thelonious Monk, performed by the Thelonious Monk Trio. It was originally released in 1954 as the fourth of five 10" albums by Monk for Prestige (PrLP 189). Its contents were later split between the two 12-inch albums Thelonious Monk Trio (side B of this record) and Thelonious Monk and Sonny Rollins (side A of this record). It has rarely been re-released in its original format, although it was included in a boxed set by Craft Records in a limited edition in 2017.

== Track listing ==
All compositions by Thelonious Monk, except where noted.

Side A:

1. "Work" – 5:18
2. "Nutty" – 5:16

Side B:

3. "Blue Monk" – 7:39
4. "Just a Gigolo" (Julius Brammer, Irving Caesar, Leonello Casucci) – 3:00

Notes

- Recorded at Rudy Van Gelder Studio in Hackensack, NJ, on September 22, 1954

== Personnel ==
- Thelonious Monk – piano
- Percy Heath – bass (on tracks 1–3)
- Art Blakey – drums (on tracks 1–3)
- Track 4 is a solo piano performance.
