= Dan Knight =

American jazz musician

Daniel Lee Knight (born September 26, 1953, Ottumwa, Iowa), is a jazz pianist, composer, educator, and author. His early piano education was in the classical tradition; his first piano teacher, Mathilde Ehrmann Maither, was a former student of Ignace Jan Paderewski. His interest in jazz began at an early age, and by age seven he was already transcribing the works of Dave Brubeck, Erroll Garner and Duke Ellington. In 1958, on seeing NBC Television's "The Subject Is Jazz", the first ever television series on the subject of jazz, and whose musical director was jazz pianist Billy Taylor, he knew he had to become a jazz pianist, too.

Knight later became a student and protégé of Billy Taylor, who himself had been a protégé of Art Tatum. He was invited to become a member of the worldwide Steinway Artist Roster in 1996. His international performances include three consecutive performances in the Acoustic Concerts Series (1997, 1998 and 1999) at the Montreux Jazz Festival. His suite for solo piano and spoken word, "The Walt Whitman Suite," was nominated for the Pulitzer Prize in Music.

== Other links ==
- Official website
