= Gilberto "Pulpo" Colón Jr. =

American pianist, composer (born 1953)

Gilberto Colón Jr.
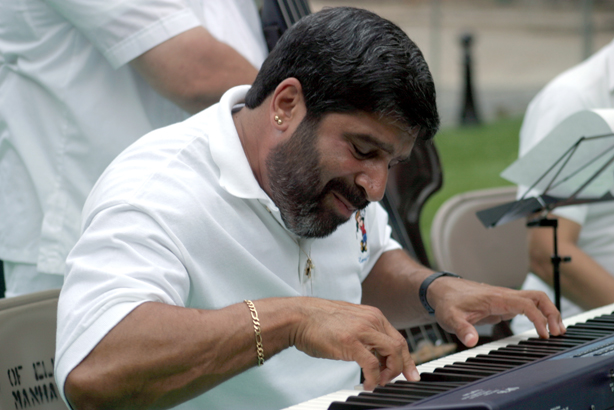
- Colón playing a solo

Background information
- Born: December 28, 1953 (age 72)
- Origin: Queens, New York City
- Genres: Salsa; Latin Jazz
- Occupations: Band Leader; Musician; Composer
- Label: The Mambo Project

Gilberto "Pulpo" Colón Jr. (Born December 28, 1953) is a pianist, composer, and band leader. He is credited for working with all three of the "Big 3" (Tito Puente, Tito Rodriguez, & Machito Orchestras).

== Early musical influences ==
Colón's family moved to the United States from Puerto Rico in the 1940s and immediately settled in the Bronx. Colón's early musical influences ranged from The Beatles, Elvis Presley to Puerto Rican “Jibaro” music. He formally began his musical career at the age of 14. After experimenting with various instruments, Colón joined his close friend Oscar Hernández (musician) with piano lessons. Under the tutelage of piano luminary Charlie Palmieri, Colón quickly learned the essential skills needed to succeed in the competitive industry. As a teenager, Colón was beginning to play playing at the epicenter of Salsa's Golden Age.

== Recording debut ==
After playing New York City's Latin circuit, Colón joined the young orchestra of Rafi Val y La Diferente. It was with La Diferente where Colón made his recording debut on the self-titled album (1971). Colón continued to perform and record on the subsequent La Diferente albums (La Sociedad '72, Fuerza Bruta '74). Following his time with La Diferente, Colón began working consistently with Louie Ramirez, Justo Betancourt, Marty Galagarza y La Conquistadora, Joe Cuba, and Andy Harlow.

== Héctor Lavoe years ==
In the winter of 1975 Colón was approached by Héctor Lavoe to join his orchestra. Colón's first recording with Lavoe was in 1977 on the acclaimed Fania Records album Comedia (album). Colón's extended piano solo on the song 'Bandolera' earned him the award of 'Best Latin Piano Solo of the Year'. Initially awarded to former Lavoe pianist Professor Joe Torres due to an editorial mistake the award bolted Colón to the forefront of Latin Music's notable musicians. Today, this is still considered one of the most historic piano solos ever recorded on a commercial salsa album. Colon served as Lavoe's Pianist and Musical Director for 16 years performing and traveling the world with the Salsa Icon.

Along with Lavoe and the “Big 3”, Colón has performed & recorded with Latin music's most popular artists including Adalberto Santiago, Kako (musician), Pete "El Conde" Rodríguez, La Bruja, and many more.

== Recordings ==
Colón recorded on the following recordings (In chronological order):

- Rafi Val y La Diferente; Self Titled - Gilberto Colón Jr., Piano
- Rafi Val y La Diferente; La Sociedad - Gilberto Colón Jr., Piano
- Marty Galargarza y La Conquistadora; Pinocho - Gilberto Colón Jr., Piano
- Rafi Val y La Diferente; Fuerza Bruta - Gilberto Colón Jr., Piano
- Alfredo "Chocolate" Armenteros; Caliente - Gilberto Colón Jr., Piano
- Andy Harlow, La Musica Brava - Gilberto Colón Jr., Piano
- Alfredo "Chocolate" Armenteros; Chocolate En El Rincon - Gilberto Colón Jr., Piano
- Charanga 76'; Self Titled - Gilberto Colón Jr., Piano
- Pete "El Conde Rodriguez; A Touch of Class - Gilberto Colón Jr., Piano
- Hector Lavoe; Comedia - Gilberto Colón Jr., Piano
- Tito Rodriguez Jr; Curious? Canta: José Alberto "El Canario" - Gilberto Colón Jr., Piano
- Latin Percussion, Drum Solos, Volume 1 - Gilberto Colón Jr., Piano
- Latin Percussion, Drum Solos, Volume 2 - Gilberto Colón Jr., Piano
- Latin Percussion, Drum Solos, Volume 3 - Gilberto Colón Jr., Piano
- Hector Lavoe; Recordando a Felipe Pirela - Gilberto Colón Jr., Piano
- Orquesta Novel; A Novel Experience - Gilberto Colón Jr., Piano
- La Salsa Mayor; Fuerte y Caliente - Gilberto Colón Jr., Piano
- Hector Lavoe; El Sabio - Gilberto Colón Jr., Piano
- Don Gonzalo Fernandez Presenta Miguel Quintana - Gilberto Colón Jr., Piano
- Charanga La Tapa; Charanga - Gilberto Colón Jr., Piano
- Hector Lavoe; Que Sentimientos - Gilberto Colón Jr., Piano
- Machito & Salsa Big Band; Live at North Sea '82 - Gilberto Colón Jr., Piano
- Louie Ramirez; Con Cache - Gilberto Colón Jr., Piano
- Frankie Morales; En Su Punto - Gilberto Colón Jr., Piano
- Frankie Morales; Sobresaliendo - Gilberto Colón Jr., Piano
- Hector Lavoe; Live - Gilberto Colón Jr., Piano
- Adalberto Santiago; Mas Sabroso - Gilberto Colón Jr., Piano
- Junior Gonzalez; Tribute To Héctor Lavoe - Gilberto Colón Jr., Piano
- Adalberto Santiago; Cosas Del Alma - Gilberto Colón Jr., Piano
- En Vivo: A.J. Diaz Y Son De La Calle Homenaje Postume A Celia Cruz Y Tito Puente - Gilberto Colón Jr., Piano
- Pulpo; Hot Bread - Gilberto Colón Jr., Piano, Musical Director, Arranger

== Hot Bread ==
Colón recorded and released his first solo album titled Pulpo's Hot Bread, which won the 2009 Independent Music Award's 'Best Latin Album'. The project featured some of the best musicians in Latin music, receiving critical acclaim.
