= Moving Out (album) =

1956 studio album by Sonny Rollins

Studio album by Sonny Rollins
- Released: 1956
- Recorded: August 18 and October 25, 1954
- Studio: Van Gelder Studio, Hackensack, New Jersey
- Genre: Jazz
- Length: 31:22
- Label: Prestige
- Producer: Bob Weinstock

Sonny Rollins chronology
Sonny Rollins with the Modern Jazz Quartet (1953)	Moving Out (1956)	Work Time (1955)

Moving Out is an album by jazz saxophonist Sonny Rollins, released in 1956. This was his second album for Prestige Records, featuring Kenny Dorham, Elmo Hope, Percy Heath, and Art Blakey, and one track with Thelonious Monk, Tommy Potter, and Art Taylor. The first four tracks had originally appeared on as the 10-inch LP Sonny Rollins Quintet Featuring Kenny Dorham (PrLP 186), and the final track had appeared on the 10-inch LP Sonny Rollins and Thelonious Monk (PrLP 190).

== Reception ==
At AllMusic, Michael G. Nastos called the group "one of the more potent combos of 1954". Author and musician Peter Niklas Wilson called the album "simply a typical blowing session, in which virtuoso up-tempo playing and a wealth of invention in a well-known framework count for more than structural innovation".

Professional ratings
Review scores
Source	Rating
Allmusic	3.5/5 stars
The Rolling Stone Jazz Record Guide	4/5 stars
The Penguin Guide to Jazz Recordings	3/4 stars

== Track listing ==
All compositions by Sonny Rollins except where noted.

Side one

1. "Moving Out" – 4:31
2. "Swingin' for Bumsy" – 5:48
3. "Silk 'n' Satin" – 4:03

Side two

1. "Solid" – 6:27
2. "More Than You Know" (Edward Eliscu, Billy Rose, Vincent Youmans) – 10:48

Note

- Recorded on August 18, 1954 (first four tracks), and October 25 ("More Than You Know")

== Personnel ==
- Sonny Rollins – tenor saxophone
- Kenny Dorham – trumpet - except More Than You Know
- Elmo Hope – piano
- Percy Heath – bass
- Art Blakey – drums
- Thelonious Monk – piano on "More Than You Know"
- Tommy Potter – bass on "More Than You Know"
- Art Taylor – drums on "More Than You Know"
