= Thelonious Monk Quintet =

Thelonious Monk Quintet (with Frank Foster, Art Blakey)

Studio album by Thelonious Monk Quintet
- Released: 1954
- Recorded: May 11, 1954
- Studios: Van Gelder Studio, Hackensack
- Genre: Jazz
- Label: Prestige

Thelonious Monk 10-inch LP chronology
Thelonious Monk Quintet Blows for LP (1953)	Thelonious Monk Quintet (with Frank Foster, Art Blakey) (1954)	Thelonious Monk Plays (1954)

Thelonious Monk Quintet (with Frank Foster, Art Blakey) is a studio album by American jazz pianist and composer Thelonious Monk, performed by the Thelonious Monk Quintet. It was originally released in 1954 as the third of five 10" LP albums by Monk for Prestige (PrLP 180). Its contents were later re-released in sequence as side 1 of the 12-inch album Monk. It has rarely been re-released in its original format, although it was included in a boxed set by Craft Recordings in a limited edition in 2017.

== Track listing ==
All compositions by Thelonious Monk, except where noted.

Side A:

1. "We See" – 5:16
2. "Smoke Gets in Your Eyes" (Otto Harbach, Jerome Kern ) – 4:34

Side B:

3. "Locomotive" – 6:23
4. "Hackensack" – 5:13

Notes

- Recorded at Van Gelder Studio in Hackensack, NJ, on May 11, 1954

== Personnel ==
- Thelonious Monk – piano
- Ray Copeland – trumpet
- Frank Foster – tenor saxophone
- Curly Russell – bass
- Art Blakey – drums
