= Thelonious Monk Trio =

Studio album by Thelonious Monk
- Released: 1954/1956
- Recorded: October 15 and December 18, 1952; September 22, 1954
- Length: 34:55
- Label: Prestige
- Producer: Bob Weinstock

Thelonious Monk chronology
Piano Solo (1954)	Thelonious Monk Trio (1954/1956)	Monk (1956)

Thelonious Monk Trio is an album by American jazz pianist and composer Thelonious Monk. The album features his earliest recordings for Prestige Records, performing as a soloist with a rhythm section of bassist Gary Mapp (originally credited as "Gerry Mapp"), either Art Blakey or Max Roach on drums, and one track with Percy Heath replacing Mapp. It also contains the earliest recorded versions of the jazz standards "Blue Monk" and "Bemsha Swing".

Secondary sources have placed the album's release year to either 1954 or 1956. It has been re-released numerous times, occasionally under the title Monk's Moods and with different track orders. Its track listing expands on the 10" LP issue Thelonious (1953), augmented with two tracks from his fourth 10" LP, Thelonious Monk Plays (with Percy Heath and Art Blakey), released in 1954.

== Release history ==
According to Sputnikmusic writer Alex Robertson, Thelonious Monk Trio was originally released in 1954 as Monk's first proper studio album. It follows the release of his two Genius of Modern Music compilations—the first volume in 1951 and the second volume in 1952. The record has since been re-released numerous times on different formats, usually with its original title, although occasionally as Monk's Moods. (Monk's Moods was first released in 1960 by Prestige.) According to Robert Christgau, the 10-track Thelonious Monk Trio "has been reissued in more iterations and titles than I can catalogue". On some of its re-releases, Robertson notes Thelonious Monk Trio had a track listing order different from the original. (See alternative track listing below).

The album also features the first recorded performances of "Blue Monk" and "Bemsha Swing". According to music journalist Charles Waring, Thelonious Monk Trio was first released in 1954 and is a 12-inch vinyl revamping of the 1953 10-inch LP Thelonious. Chris May from All About Jazz also placed the release year to 1954.

Chris Sheridan, in his book Brilliant Corners: A Bio-discography of Thelonious Monk, dates the album's first 12-inch vinyl release, Thelonious Monk Trio (Prestige LP 7027), to 1956 and lists it as the first Monk LP in Prestige's 7000 series of 12-inch records, followed that same year by Monk and Thelonious Monk and Sonny Rollins. (Note: Sheridan qualifies his information with the following: "Prestige numbering was altered several times during the label's independent existence. Our listing has been guided by the number on the sleeve, even when the label number may have differed slightly: eg. 7000 series albums often used the suffix LP on sleeve (and in advertisements) but on the label it may have been PRLP.")

== Critical reception ==
Retrospective professional reviews
Review scores
Source	Rating
All Music Guide to Jazz	5/5 stars
AllMusic	4.5/5 stars
MSN Music (Expert Witness)	A+
The Penguin Guide to Jazz	3.5/4 stars
The Rolling Stone Album Guide	5/5 stars
Rolling Stone Jazz Record Guide	4/5 stars
Sputnikmusic	4.5/5

Thelonious Monk Trio received critical acclaim during the 2000s. Reviewing in All Music Guide to Jazz (2002), Scott Yanow said the album features "brilliant performances" in spite of Monk "suffering from lack of work and a complete lack of recognition from the public" at the time of the recordings. Fellow AllMusic contributor Ronnie D. Lankford Jr. called its music "intimate, intense, and inspired ... 35 minutes of professional musicians practicing their craft", and wrote that, although they were "pieced together from three different sessions," the recordings' "small settings ... allow the necessary space for Monk's explorations, which conjure up images of a mathematician working out geometric patterns on the keyboard." BBC Music's Charles de Ledesma remarked that "the various personnel make little difference to the overall effect – Monk throughout offers a sumptuous flow of melody, punctuation, nuance and charm."

Reviewing the album's 2007 Rudy Van Gelder remaster, Chris May from All About Jazz hailed Thelonious Monk Trio as "immortal, stratospheric music" and "amongst the most eternal" of Monk's releases. "At this period like no other", May said, "Monk's rhythmic attack packed the power of an express train." Sputnikmusic's Alex Robertson said that "even when Monk gets nutty, as on the brutally virtuosic 'Trinkle, Tinkle,' the album's appeal lies not in his 'sabotage' of popular music but his ability to turn it into something invigoratingly weird, two approaches often conflated when looking back on the work of an inventive musician." In MSN Music, Christgau said the record offers "the not so common chance to hear Monk as a solely featured soloist with a rhythm section", with drummers Art Blakey and Max Roach performing like "co-stars".

== Track listing ==
All compositions by Thelonious Monk, except where noted.

Side 1

1. "Little Rootie Tootie" – 3:06
2. "Sweet and Lovely" (Gus Arnheim, Jules LeMare, Harry Tobias) – 3:33
3. "Bye-Ya" – 2:46
4. "Monk's Dream" – 3:07
5. "Trinkle, Tinkle" – 2:49
6. "These Foolish Things" (Harry Link, Holt Marvell, Jack Strachey) – 2:46

Side 2

7. "Blue Monk" – 7:39
8. "Just a Gigolo" (Julius Brammer, Irving Caesar, Leonello Casucci) – 3:00
9. "Bemsha Swing" (Thelonious Monk, Denzil Best) – 3:10
10. "Reflections" – 2:48

Notes

- Tracks 1–4 recorded on October 15, 1952, and originally released as Side A of the 10" LP Thelonious (Prestige PrLP 142)
- Tracks 5–6 and 9–10 recorded on December 18, 1952, and originally released as Side B of the 10" LP Thelonious (Prestige PrLP 142)
- Tracks 7 & 8 recorded September 22, 1954, and originally released as Side B of the 10" LP Thelonious Monk Plays (with Percy Heath and Art Blakey) (Prestige PrLP 189)

=== Alternate sequence ===
While the song order above has become standard, and is closer to the sequence of the 10" Prestige album Thelonious, the 12" album was sequenced as follows in all of its 1950s and 1960s releases, including the original PRLP 7027, as well as its retitlings Monk's Moods (PRLP 7159, 1960) and The High Priest (PR 7508, 1968). Beginning in the 1970s, some releases switched sides, and over time the sequence beginning with "Little Rootie Tootie" became more common.

Side 1

1. "Blue Monk" – 7:39
2. "Just a Gigolo" (Julius Brammer, Irving Caesar, Leonello Casucci) – 3:00
3. "Bemsha Swing" (Thelonious Monk, Denzil Best) – 3:10
4. "Reflections" – 2:48

Side 2

5. "Little Rootie Tootie" – 3:06
6. "Sweet and Lovely" (Gus Arnheim, Jules LeMare, Harry Tobias) – 3:33
7. "Bye-Ya" – 2:46
8. "Monk's Dream" – 3:07
9. "Trinkle, Tinkle" – 2:49
10. "These Foolish Things" (Harry Link, Holt Marvell, Jack Strachey) – 2:46

== Personnel ==
(Track listings here refer to the version beginning with "Little Rootie Tootie".)

- Thelonious Monk – piano
- Gary Mapp – bass (tracks 1–6, 9–10)
- Art Blakey – drums (tracks 1–4, 7)
- Max Roach – drums (tracks 5–6, 9–10)
- Percy Heath – bass (track 7)
- Track 8 is a solo piano performance by Monk.
- Garvin Masseaux plays a shaker (in son clave rhythm) on "Bye-Ya"
