= Thelonious Monk Plays Duke Ellington =

Studio album by Thelonious Monk
- Released: December 1955
- Recorded: July 21 & 27, 1955
- Studio: Van Gelder; Hackensack, New Jersey
- Genre: Bebop
- Length: 36:55
- Label: Riverside; RLP 12-201
- Producer: Orrin Keepnews

Thelonious Monk chronology
Thelonious Monk and Sonny Rollins (1956)	Thelonious Monk Plays Duke Ellington (1955)	The Unique Thelonious Monk (1956)

Alternate cover
- Reissue cover used for pressings from 1958 onward.

Thelonious Monk Plays Duke Ellington, also known as Thelonious Monk Plays the Music of Duke Ellington, is an album by American jazz pianist Thelonious Monk which was recorded in July 1955 and released on Riverside later that year. The album contains Monk's versions of songs by Duke Ellington.

== Background ==
=== Composition and recording ===
Although Monk occasionally performed covers, he primarily played his own compositions. He had recorded several albums of originals during 1953 – 1954 for his previous label, Prestige. But there was a perception, particularly among music critics, that Monk's music was "too difficult" for the mainstream public, and his Prestige albums sold poorly. After Riverside bought out Monk's contract in 1954 for slightly over $100, Riverside convinced Monk to record an entire album of Ellington tunes, an idea of record producer Orrin Keepnews.

Monk's only 1955 session including his original compositions took place on October 15, and was released under the group name Gigi Gryce Quartet, occupying Side 2 of the album Nica's Tempo. As the next Riverside album, The Unique Thelonious Monk consisted of standards, it would be another year before Riverside Records recorded any original Monk compositions (for the album Brilliant Corners)

=== Release history ===
While the original album artwork upon release used images of Monk and his bandmates, pressings from 1958 onward featured artwork lifted from The Repast of the Lion by French Post-Impressionist Henri Rousseau.

The album was reissued by Riverside on March 27, 2007, in the United States and on April 16, 2007, in the United Kingdom.

== Legacy ==
Jazz pianist Marcus Roberts called the album "a masterpiece in jazz" and cited it as a template for his 1990 album Alone with Three Giants. "When you think of great artists paying homage to great artists, that one recording let me know what I had to do."

== Reception ==
Professional ratings
Review scores
Source	Rating
AllMusic	4/5 stars
The Penguin Guide to Jazz Recordings	3/4 stars
PopMatters	9/10 stars
The Rolling Stone Jazz Record Guide	3/5 stars

Sean Murphy of PopMatters called it "an outstanding album" when it was reissued in 2007. He called it an "overlooked gem in the Monk discography, sandwiched as it is between his earlier 'genius of modern music' stage and the mid '50s through mid '60s, when he made his most enduring work." AllMusic's Lindsay Planer felt that Ellington's characteristic "delicacy and inherently intricate melodies" are ideal for "Monk's angular and progressive interpretations." He recommended it to "all dimension of jazz enthusiast", even though "Monk and Ellington aficionados may rate it slightly higher".

By contrast, David Rickert of All About Jazz found the album "fairly tame" and lagging with "an ambling pace". Although he viewed it as "a worthy addition to any serious Monk collection", Rickert wrote that it lacked Monk's more "abrasive" sound and "obscures what makes Monk so captivating in the first place".

== Track listing ==
All songs written by Duke Ellington, except as noted.

Side 1

1. It Don't Mean a Thing (If It Ain't Got That Swing) – 4:38
2. Sophisticated Lady – 4:27
3. I Got It Bad and That Ain't Good – 5:52
4. Black and Tan Fantasy (Miley, Ellington) – 3:24

Side 2

1. Mood Indigo (Ellington, Bigard) – 3:13
2. I Let a Song Go Out of My Heart – 5:40
3. Solitude – 3:42
4. Caravan (Tizol, Ellington) – 5:55

== Personnel ==
=== Musicians ===
- Thelonious Monk – piano
- Oscar Pettiford – bass
- Kenny Clarke – drums
