= Thelonious (album) =

Studio album by Thelonious Monk
- Released: 1953
- Recorded: October 15 and December 18, 1952
- Studio: Beltone Studios
- Genre: Jazz
- Length: 24:05
- Label: Prestige

Thelonious Monk 10-inch LP chronology
Genius of Modern Music: Volume 2 (1952)	Thelonious (1953)	Thelonious Monk Quintet Blows for LP (1953)

Thelonious is a 10" LP by American jazz pianist and composer Thelonious Monk, performed by the Thelonious Monk Trio. It was originally released in 1953 as the first of five 10" LP studio albums by Monk for Prestige (PrLP 142), and was later expanded into the 12-inch album Thelonious Monk Trio with the addition of two non-chronological later tracks. It has rarely been re-released in its original format, although it was included in a boxed set by Craft Records in a limited edition in 2017.

The album features his earliest recordings for the Prestige label, performed with bassist Gary Mapp, and alternately Art Blakey and Max Roach on drums.

== Track listing ==
All compositions by Thelonious Monk, except where noted.

Side A:

1. "Little Rootie Tootie" – 3:06
2. "Sweet and Lovely" (Gus Arnheim, Jules LeMare, Harry Tobias) – 3:33
3. "Bye–Ya" – 2:46
4. "Monk's Dream" – 3:07

Side B:

5. "Trinkle, Tinkle" – 2:49
6. "These Foolish Things" (Harry Link, Holt Marvell, Jack Strachey) – 2:46
7. "Bemsha Swing" (Thelonious Monk, Denzil Best) – 3:10
8. "Reflections" – 2:48

Notes

- Tracks 1–4 recorded on October 15, 1952
- Tracks 5–8 recorded on December 18, 1952
- Recording engineer: unknown, Beltone Studios, New York City

== Singles and EPs ==
A notable feature of these eight recordings is their brevity. Like the Blue Note recordings before them, it appears these performances were kept short such that they could be simultaneously released on 45 and 78 rpm singles and EPs. And, in fact, most of these selections were released in that format at the time, as well:

- PR 795 Thelonious Monk Trio – Sweet And Lovely / Bye–Ya
- PR 838 Thelonious Monk Trio – Trinkle, Tinkle / These Foolish Things
- PR 850 Thelonious Monk Trio – Little Rootie Tootie / Monk's Dream
- PREP 1329 Thelonious Monk Trio (EP with same contents as Side A of the 10" LP)
- 45–162 Thelonious Monk Trio – Blue Monk / Bye–Ya (re–released 1959)

The next batch of recordings Monk produced for Prestige saw him beginning to take advantage of the longer LP format.

== Personnel ==
- Thelonious Monk – piano
- Art Blakey – drums (tracks 1–4)
- Gary Mapp – bass
- Max Roach – drums (tracks 5–8)
- an uncredited person plays a shaker (in son clave rhythm) on "Bye–Ya"
