= The Unique Thelonious Monk =

Studio album by Thelonious Monk
- Released: August 1956
- Recorded: March 17 and April 3, 1956
- Genre: Jazz
- Length: 38:12
- Label: Riverside
- Producer: Orrin Keepnews

Thelonious Monk chronology
Thelonious Monk Plays Duke Ellington (1956)	The Unique Thelonious Monk (1956)	Brilliant Corners (1957)

Original cover
- Cover of the original 1956 release. The "postage stamp" cover was used for pressings from 1958 onward.

Professional ratings
Review scores
Source	Rating
AllMusic	4.5/5 stars
The Encyclopedia of Popular Music	4/5 stars
The Penguin Guide to Jazz Recordings	3/4 stars

The Unique Thelonious Monk is a 1956 album by Thelonious Monk. It was his second for Riverside Records, and, like his Riverside debut, is made up of standards. It was a continuation of Riverside's strategy to broaden consumer interest in Monk by having him record cover versions of well-known material which, Riverside hoped, would help to break down the prevailing perception that Monk's original music was "too difficult" for mass-market acceptance.

Riverside, at the time of the first re-issue, printed copies of the stamp that was featured on the cover art. Some of these made their way through the United States Postal Service, which issued a restraining order against the company. Monk was subsequently featured on a genuine stamp, which was issued by the U.S. Postal Service in 1995.

== Track listing ==
Side One

1. "Liza (All the Clouds'll Roll Away)" (George & Ira Gershwin, Gus Kahn) – 3:11
2. "Memories of You" (Eubie Blake, Andy Razaf) – 4:15
3. "Honeysuckle Rose" (Fats Waller, Andy Razaf) – 5:32
4. "Darn That Dream" (Eddie DeLange, James Van Heusen) – 6:30

Side Two

1. "Tea for Two" (Vincent Youmans, Irving Caesar) – 5:52
2. "You Are Too Beautiful" (Richard Rodgers, Lorenz Hart) – 4:53
3. "Just You, Just Me" (Jesse Greer, Raymond Klages) – 7:59

== Personnel ==
- Thelonious Monk – piano
- Art Blakey – drums (except for track 2)
- Oscar Pettiford – bass (except for track 2)
