= Live at Ronnie Scott's =

Live at Ronnie Scott's may refer to:

- Live at Ronnie Scott's (Nina Simone album), 1984
- Live at Ronnie Scott's (Jamie Cullum album), 2006
- Live at Ronnie Scott's (Fourth World album), 1992
- Live at Ronnie Scott's (Curtis Mayfield album), 1988
- Live at Ronnie Scott's (Taj Mahal album), recorded in 1988 and released in 1990
- Live at Ronnie Scott's (Wes Montgomery album), 1965
- Live at Ronnie Scott's (Buddy Rich album), 1980
- Live at Ronnie Scott's (Jeff Beck album), 2008
- Live at Ronnie Scott's (video), a DVD by Lisa Stansfield

== See also ==
- Ronnie Scott's Jazz Club, a jazz club which has operated in London since 1959
- Very Alive at Ronnie Scotts, an alternative title for the Buddy Rich big band album Rich in London (1971)
