= The Flip Phillips Buddy Rich Trio =

Studio album by Flip Phillips, Buddy Rich
- Released: 1953
- Recorded: New York, Los Angeles 1951, 1952
- Genre: Jazz
- Label: Clef
- Producer: Norman Granz

Flip Phillips chronology
Flip Phillips Quartet	The Flip Phillips Buddy Rich Trio (1953)	The Flip Phillips Quintet

Buddy Rich chronology
The Flip Phillips Buddy Rich Trio (1953)	The Swinging Buddy Rich (1954)

The Flip Phillips Buddy Rich Trio is a 1953 Clef Records release of several small jazz combo tracks recorded in 1951 and 1952.

== Track listing ==
LP side A

- "Funky Blues" (Flip Phillips)
- "Indiana" (Ballard MacDonald, James F. Hanley)
- "Stardust" (Hoagy Carmichael, Mitchell Parish)
- "Goodbye" (Gordon Jenkins)
- "Salute to Pres" (Phillips)
- "Swedish Pastry" (Phillips)

LP side B

- "Carioca" (Vincent Youmans, Edward Eliscu, Gus Kahn)
- "Take the 'A' Train" (Billy Strayhorn)
- "Bugle Call Rag" (Jack Pettis, Billy Meyers, Elmer Schoebel)
- "I Didn't Know What Time It Was" (Richard Rodgers, Lorenz Hart)
- "Three Little Words" (Harry Ruby, Bert Kalmar)
- "Flip's Boogie" (aka "Trio Boogie"?) (Flip Phillips)

== Personnel ==
- Flip Phillips - tenor saxophone
- Buddy Rich - drums (on "Carioca," "Take the 'A' Train," "Bugle Call Rag," "I Didn't Know What Time It Was," "Three Little Words" and "Flip's Boogie")
- Earl Watkins - drums (on "Goodbye," "Salute to Pres" and "Swedish Pastry")
- Jo Jones - drums (on "Funky Blues," "Indiana")
- Joe McDonald - drums (on "Stardust")
- Hank Jones - piano (on "Carioca," "Take the 'A' Train," "Bugle Call Rag," "I Didn't Know What Time It Was" and "Three Little Words"), organ (on "Flip's Boogie" / "Trio Boogie")
- Richard Wyands - piano (on "Goodbye," "Salute to Pres" and "Swedish Pastry")
- Dick Hyman - piano (on "Funky Blues," "Indiana")
- Lou Levy - piano (on "Stardust")
- Vernon Alley - bass (on "Goodbye," "Salute to Pres" and "Swedish Pastry")
- Gene Ramey - bass (on "Funky Blues," "Indiana")
- Jimmy Woode - bass & vocal (on "Stardust")
- Bill Harris - trombone (on "Funky Blues," "Indiana," "Stardust")
- Charlie Etter - trombone (on "Goodbye," "Salute to Pres" and "Swedish Pastry")
- Allen Smith - trumpet (on "Goodbye," "Salute to Pres" and "Swedish Pastry")
- Jerome Richardson - baritone saxophone (on "Goodbye," "Salute to Pres" and "Swedish Pastry")

"Funky Blues" and "Indiana" recorded 1951 March 8, NYC
"Stardust" recorded 1951 August 9, Los Angeles
"Goodbye," "Salute to Pres" and "Swedish Pastry" recorded 1952 February, Los Angeles
"Carioca" - "Flip's Boogie" (all of side 'B') recorded 1952 December 14, NYC

== References / notes ==
- Clef MGC 634
- The Flip Phillips Buddy Rich Trio discography at jazzdisco.org
