= Lionel Hampton Presents Buddy Rich =

Studio album by Buddy Rich
- Released: 1977
- Recorded: October 19, 1977
- Studio: in New York City
- Genre: Jazz
- Length: 35:50
- Label: Who's Who in Jazz
- Producer: Lionel Hampton, Bill Titone, John Cevetello

Buddy Rich chronology
Buddy Rich Plays and Plays and Plays (1977)	Lionel Hampton Presents Buddy Rich (1977)	Class of '78 (1978)

Professional ratings
Review scores
Source	Rating
Allmusic	4/5 stars

Lionel Hampton Presents Buddy Rich is a jazz album recorded by Buddy Rich and released by the Who's Who in Jazz record label in 1977. The album has been re-issued by different labels under different names including, Buddy's Cherokee, The Lionel Hampton Sessions and Sounds of Jazz Vol. 10.

== Track listing ==
LP side A:

1. "Moment's Notice" (John Coltrane) – 5:28
2. "Giant Steps" (John Coltrane) – 5:32
3. "Buddy's Cherokee" (Buddy Rich, Lionel Hampton) – 7:26

LP side B:

1. "Take the 'A' Train" (Billy Strayhorn) – 6:13
2. "I'll Never Be the Same" (Gus Kahn, Matty Malneck, Frank Signorelli) – 3:33
3. "Latin Silk" (Paul Moen) – 7:38

Bonus tracks added to some later re-issues:

"Buddy's Rock" (Buddy Rich) – 5:54
"My Funny Valentine" (Richard Rodgers, Lorenz Hart) – 6:00
"Hamp, Rich, Dido Blues" (Jon Hendricks) – 4:53

== Personnel ==
- Buddy Rich – drums
- Lionel Hampton – vibraphone
- Barry Kiener – piano
- Tom Warrington – bass
- Candido Camero – congas
- Steve Marcus – tenor saxophone
- Gary Pribek – saxophone
- Paul Moen – tenor saxophone
- Jon Hendricks – vocals on "Hamp, Rich, Dido Blues"
