= Rich and Famous =

Rich and Famous may refer to:

== Theatre and film ==
- Rich and Famous (play), a 1974 John Guare play
- Rich and Famous (1981 film), starring Jacqueline Bisset and Candice Bergen
- Rich and Famous (1987 film), Hong Kong film directed by Taylor Wong

== Music ==
- Rich and Famous (album), a 1983 album by the Buddy Rich Big Band
- Rich and Famous, a 1988 album by Blue Mercedes
- Rich and Famous, a 2003 album Vice Squad
- Rich & Famous, an EP by Accept
