= Charles Owens (musician) =

American jazz musician

- Born: 1939 (age 86–87)
- Genre: Musician
- Instrument: Saxophone
- Label: Vault

Charles M. Brown (born April 4, 1939, Phoenix, Arizona), better known as Charles Owens, is an American jazz saxophonist and flautist. Owens should not be confused with Charles Owens (Saxophonist, 1972), an American jazz saxophonist born in 1972 who has recorded for Fresh Sound Records.

Owens began playing music while attending the University of San Diego; following a stint in the United States Armed Forces, he studied at Berklee College of Music. He worked in the bands of Buddy Rich and Mongo Santamaria as an alto saxophonist in the late 1960s, and in the 1970s played mostly tenor and soprano saxophone. He played in that decade with Bobby Bryant, Paul Humphrey, Diana Ross, John Mayall, Frank Zappa, Lorez Alexandria, Henry Franklin, Patrice Rushen, Gerald Wilson, Lorez Alexandria, and James Newton among others. He worked with Newton again in the mid-1980s, and also played in the 1980s with John Carter, Horace Tapscott, and Mercer Ellington. Later he worked with Carmen Bradford, Jeannie Cheatham and Jimmy Cheatham, and Buddy Childers.

== Discography ==
- I Stand Alone (Vault, 1971) as Charles Owens' Mother Lode
- The Two Quartets (Discovery Records, 1978)
- Plays The "Music Of Harry Warren" Volume 1 (Discovery Records, 1980) as Charles Owens New York Art Ensemble

With Buddy Rich Big Band

- The New One! (Pacific Jazz, 1967)
- Mercy, Mercy (Pacific Jazz, 1968)

With Mongo Santamaria

- Workin' on a Groovy Thing (Columbia, 1969)

With others

- Swahili Strut (Cadet, 1971) with Bobby Bryant
- A Star Is Born (Columbia, 1976) with Barbra Streisand and Kris Kristofferson
- Dingo (Warner Bros., 1991) with Miles Davis and Michel Legrand
