= Sam Most =

American jazz musician (1930–2013)

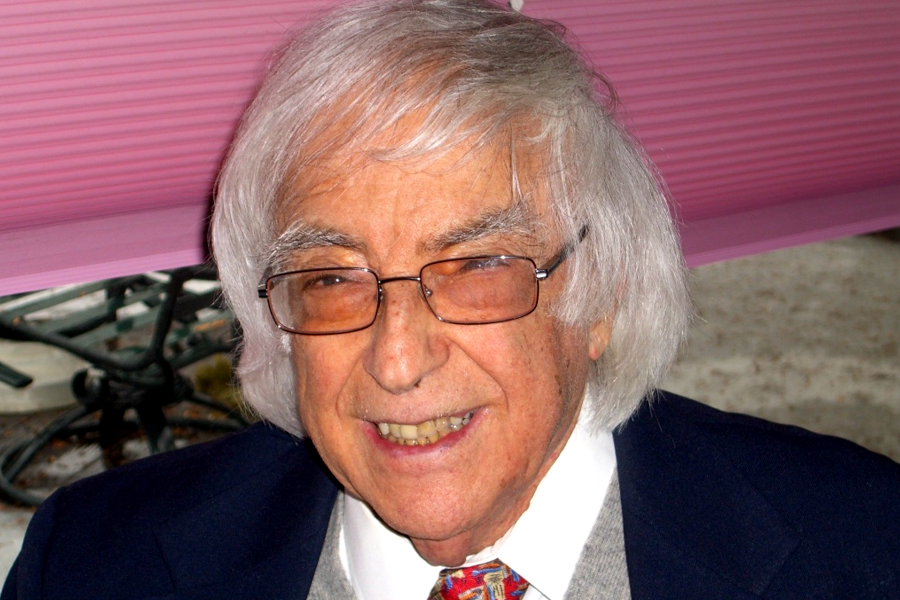
- Most in New York City, 2009

Background information
- Born: December 16, 1930; Atlantic City, New Jersey, US
- Died: June 13, 2013 (aged 82) Los Angeles
- Genres: Jazz
- Occupation: Musician
- Instruments: Flute, clarinet, tenor saxophone
- Years active: 1948 – 2013

Samuel Most (December 16, 1930 – June 13, 2013) was an American jazz flutist, clarinetist and tenor saxophonist, based in Los Angeles. He was "probably the first great jazz flutist", according to jazz historian Leonard Feather.

== Biography ==
He was born in Atlantic City, New Jersey, and began his career in music at the age of 18 with the bands of Tommy Dorsey, Shep Fields, Boyd Raeburn and Don Redman. He also performed many times with his older brother, clarinetist Abe Most.

His first recording was at age 23 on a Prestige 7" EP, "Introducing A New Star Sam Most". The record included a track titled "Undercurrent Blues" that featured an extended flute solo. The next year he was awarded DownBeat magazine's "Critic's New Star Award". Between 1953 and 1958 Most led and recorded sessions for the Prestige, Debut, Vanguard and Bethlehem labels. He also did session work for Chris Connor, Paul Quinichette and Teddy Wilson. He was a member of the Buddy Rich band from 1959 to 1961.

Most resurfaced in the late 1970s recording six albums on the Xanadu label.

From 1987 Most, with producer Fernando Gelbard of Liquidjazz.com, recorded four albums, including Solo Flute.

He was the guest of and played for the King of Thailand three times. He was the subject of Edmond Goff's documentary film Sam Most, Jazz Flutist (2001).

Sam Most died on June 13, 2013, from cancer, at Woodland Hills, Los Angeles. He was 82.

== Discography ==
=== As leader ===
- Sam Most Sextet - Introducing A New Star Sam Most (Prestige, 1952 released 1953)
- Sam Most Quartet - Sam Most Quartet Plus 2 (Debut, 1953 released 1958)
- I'm Nuts About the Most...Sam That Is! (Bethlehem, 1955)
- The Herbie Mann-Sam Most Quintet (Bethlehem, 1955)
- Musically Yours (Bethlehem, 1956)
- Plays Bird, Monk, and Miles (Bethlehem, 1957)
- The Amazing Mr. Sam Most (Bethlehem, 1957)
- Mostly Flute (Xanadu, 1976)
- But Beautiful (Catalyst, 1976)
- Flute Flight (Xanadu, 1977)
- Flute Talk (Xanadu, 1979)
- From the Attic of My Mind (Xanadu, 1980)
- Any Time, Any Season (Innovation, 1987)
- New Jazz Standards (Summit, 2014)

=== As sideman ===
- Louis Bellson, Thunderbird (Impulse!, 1965)
- Clare Fischer, Extension (Pacific Jazz, 1963)
- Stan Kenton, Hair (Capitol, 1969)
- Paul Quinichette, Moods (EmArcy, 1954)
- Buddy Rich, Playtime (Argo, 1961)
- Buddy Rich, Blues Caravan (Verve Records, 1961)
- Lalo Schifrin, There's a Whole Lalo Schifrin Goin' On (Dot, 1968)
- Lalo Schifrin, Ins and Outs (Palo Alto, 1982)
