= Mercy, Mercy =

Mercy, Mercy may refer to:

- Mercy, Mercy (band), band which had a hit with "It Must Be Heaven" 1984
- Mercy, Mercy (album), Buddy Rich 1968
- "Mercy, Mercy" (song), Don Covay 1964

== See also ==
- "Mercy, Mercy, Mercy", jazz song written by Joe Zawinul in 1966 for
- Mercy, Mercy, Mercy! Live at 'The Club', album by Julian "Cannonball" Adderley
- "Mercy Mercy Me (The Ecology)", 1971 song by Marvin Gaye
