= Betcha (album) =

Studio album by Stanley Turrentine
- Released: 1979
- Recorded: May & June 1979
- Studio: Dawnbreaker Recording Studios, San Fernando, CA
- Genre: Jazz; soul jazz; funk
- Length: 40:16
- Label: Elektra; 6E-217 LP
- Producer: Stanley Turrentine

Stanley Turrentine chronology
What About You! (1978)	Betcha (1979)	New Time Shuffle (1979)

Betcha is a studio album by American saxophonist Stanley Turrentine, recorded in May and June 1979 and released later that year by Elektra Records, his first for the label. It features Turrentine backed by R&B vocalists and a string orchestra.

In 1980, Betcha was nominated for a Grammy Award in the category of Best Jazz Fusion Performance, Vocal or Instrumental.

== Reception ==
Professional ratings
Review scores
Source	Rating
AllMusic	2/5 stars
Jazzwise	2/5 stars
The Rolling Stone Album Guide	2/5 stars

The AllMusic review by Steve Leggett stated, "things don't heat up too much and Turrentine's sax coasts over the embedded synthesized strings and orchestrated background vocals, [...] although the synthesizers and massed guitars provide enough fanfare to make it all sound bigger than it really is. In the end, Turrentine plays great, like he always does, but it all gets muted by the soaring arrangements, leaving Betcha sounding majestic but somehow strangely empty."

Alyn Shipton of Jazzwise wrote, "Compared to Turrentine's Blue Note work, this 1979 set with orchestra and singers is saccharine and cloying—definitely not his best work."

== Track listing ==
All tracks are written by Stanley Turrentine except where noted.

No.	Title	Writer(s)	Length
1.	"Take Me Home"	Michele Aller; Bob Esty	4:24
2.	"Love Is the Answer"	Todd Rundgren	4:57
3.	"Betcha"	Thom Bell; Linda Creed	6:28
4.	"Concentrate on You"		4:32
5.	"You"	Marlena Shaw	5:52
6.	"Hamlet (So Peaceful)"		4:56
7.	"Long Time Gone"		4:25
8.	"Together Again"		4:42
Total length:			40:16

== Personnel ==
Music

- Stanley Turrentine – tenor saxophone; producer
- Lynn Davis, Jim Gilstrap, Marlena Jeter, John Lehman, Andrea Robinson, Zedric Turnbough – background vocals
- Charles Fearing, Lee Ritenour, Thom Rotella, David T. Walker, Wah Wah Watson – electric guitar
- Sonny Burke – keyboards
- Todd Cochran – synthesizer
- Earl Watkins – electric bass
- James Gadson, Jeff Porcaro – drums
- Eddie "Bongo" Brown – percussion, synthesizer
- Gary Coleman – bells, vibraphone
- Billy Page – conductor, contractor
- Gene Page – conductor, arranger
- Harry Bluestone – concertmaster, violin

Technical

- Richard Carpenter – production coordinator
- Debbie Thompson – assistant recording engineer
