= Class of '78 =

Studio album by Buddy Rich
- Released: 1978
- Recorded: October 1977
- Genre: Jazz
- Length: 29:51
- Label: Century Records
- Producer: Norman Schwartz

Buddy Rich chronology
Lionel Hampton Presents Buddy Rich (1977)	Class of '78 (1978)	Together Again: For the First Time (1978)

Alternative cover / title
- DCC Compact Classics CD re-issue

Professional ratings
Review scores
Source	Rating
Allmusic	4/5 stars
DownBeat	4/5 stars

Class of '78 is a big band jazz album recorded by Buddy Rich in 1977. Originally released by Century Records as a "direct-to-disc" LP album Limited Edition, it was widely released in 1978, and re-issued on Compact Disc as The Greatest Drummer That Ever Lived with "The Best Band I Ever Had".

== Reception ==
DownBeat assigned the album 4 stars. Reviewer Chuck Berg wrote,

The ride cymbal sizzles, the hi-hat pops and the snare drum snaps. The bass drum, however, booms, booms, booms . . . the disc comes very close to putting you right at ringside. Aside from Buddy's bravura breaks and fills, there are fine solo spots by tenor/soprano saxman Steve Marcus, tenorist Gary Pribek, trumpeter Dean Pratt and pianist Barry Keiner. The section work is precise and the ensembles swing with abandon.

== Track listing ==
LP side A:

1. "Birdland" (Zawinul) – 6:46
2. "Bouncin' with Bud" (Powell) – 5:55

LP side B:

1. "Cape Verdean Blues" (Silver) – 6:17
2. "Fiesta" (Corea) – 6:23
3. "Funk City Ola" (Mintzer) – 4:30

== Personnel ==
- Buddy Rich – drums
- Alan Gauvin – alto saxophone, soprano saxophone, flute
- Chuck Wilson – alto saxophone, soprano saxophone, flute
- Steve Marcus – tenor saxophone, soprano saxophone
- Gary Bribek – tenor saxophone, percussion (cowbell)
- Greg Smith – baritone saxophone, percussion (cabasa)
- Chuck Schmidt – trumpet
- Dean Pratt – trumpet
- John Marshall – trumpet
- Danny Hayes – trumpet
- Matt Johnson – trombone
- Dale Kirkland – trombone
- Edward Eby – bass trombone
- Barry Kiener – keyboards
- Tommy Warrington – bass
