= Sing and Swing with Buddy Rich =

Studio album by Buddy Rich
- Released: 1955
- Recorded: January 26 and May 16, 1955
- Genre: Jazz
- Label: Norgran
- Producer: Norman Granz

Buddy Rich chronology
The Swinging Buddy Rich (1954)	Sing and Swing with Buddy Rich (1955)	Buddy and Sweets (1955)

Alternative cover
- Original Columbia 7 inch E.P.

Sing and Swing with Buddy Rich is a jazz album recorded in New York City in January 1955 by Buddy Rich. The first 4 tracks were originally released as a 7-inch, 45 RPM EP.

== Track listing ==
1. "Everything Happens To Me"
2. "Wrap Your Troubles In Dreams"
3. "Sure Thing"
4. "Glad To Be Unhappy"
5. Ballad Medley
  1. "Over The Rainbow"
  2. "You've Changed"
  3. "Time After Time"
  4. "This Is Always"
  5. "My Heart Stood Still"
  6. "I Hadn't Anyone Till You"

== Personnel ==
except "Ballad Medley":

- Buddy Rich – vocals
- Louis Bellson – drums
- Oscar Peterson – piano
- Ray Brown – bass
- Herb Ellis – guitar
- Lee Castle – trumpet
- Howard Gibeling Orchestra - strings

on "Ballad Medley":

- Buddy Rich – drums
- Oscar Peterson – piano
- Ray Brown – bass
- Freddie Green – guitar
- Thad Jones – trumpet
- Joe Newman – trumpet
- Ben Webster – tenor saxophone
- Frank Wess – tenor saxophone
