= Buddy Rich, Live at the 1982 Montreal Jazz Festival =

1982 live album by Buddy Rich

Video by Buddy Rich
- Recorded: 1982, Montreal, Canada
- Genre: Jazz
- Label: Hudson Music

Buddy Rich – Live at the 1982 Montreal Jazz Festival

Live album by Buddy Rich
- Released: 1982
- Recorded: 1982, Montreal, Canada
- Genre: Jazz
- Label: Hudson Music

Buddy Rich chronology
Buddy Rich Band (1981)	Buddy Rich – Live at the 1982 Montreal Jazz Festival (1982)	Rich and Famous (1983)

Buddy Rich – Live at the 1982 Montreal Jazz Festival is a video (DVD) and audio (CD) recording made of jazz drummer Buddy Rich and the Buddy Rich Big Band at the 1982 Montreal Jazz Festival.

== Track listing ==
1. "Hookin It"
2. "Brush Strokes"
3. "If They Could See Me Now"
4. "Good News"
5. "West Side Story Medley"
6. "Carioca"
7. "Time Check"
8. "Green Dolphin Street" (Bonus Clip on DVD only)

== Personnel ==
- Buddy Rich – drums
- Mike Boone – bass guitar
- Lee Musiker – piano

Trumpets

- Dave Stahl
- Doug Clark
- Chris Pasin
- Jay Coble

Trombones

- Peter Enblom
- Ken Crane
- Pete Beltran

Saxophones

- Steve Marcus
- Mike Smith
- Andy Fusco
- Walt Weiskopf
- Keith Bishop
