= The Lester Young Buddy Rich Trio =

Studio album by Lester Young, Buddy Rich
- Released: 1955
- Recorded: March–April 1946, Radio Recorders, Hollywood
- Genre: Jazz
- Length: 32:48
- Label: Norgran
- Producer: Norman Granz

Lester Young chronology
Lester Young - Pres	The Lester Young Buddy Rich Trio (1955)	Lester Swings Again

Buddy Rich chronology
Buddy and Sweets (1955)	The Lester Young Buddy Rich Trio (1955)	The Wailing Buddy Rich (1955)

Professional ratings
Review scores
Source	Rating
Allmusic	4.5/5 stars
The Penguin Guide to Jazz Recordings	(1994 reissue)

The Lester Young Buddy Rich Trio is a jazz trio album recorded in Hollywood, California in March and April 1946 by Lester Young, Nat King Cole and Buddy Rich.

== Release history ==
The first 4 tracks were originally released on Mercury Records as The Lester Young Trio. The remaining 4 tracks were released on Norman Granz' Clef Records label as The Lester Young Trio No. 2 before all 8 tracks were combined and released by Granz' Norgran Records label as The Lester Young Buddy Rich Trio. Nat King Cole was under contract with a different record label at the time so was credited only as "Aye Guy" on the original Mercury / Clef / Norgran releases.

In 1994 Verve Records released a CD version of The Lester Young Trio which combined all 8 tracks from the 1946 Hollywood trio recordings, plus an alternate take of "I Cover the Waterfront" and an additional shortened version of "Back to the Land", with 4 additional tracks recorded earlier by a quintet with Nat King Cole (but without Lester Young or Buddy Rich).

== Track listing ==
LP Side A

1. "Back to the Land" (Young) – 3:52
2. "I've Found a New Baby" (Palmer, Williams) – 4:04
3. "I Cover the Waterfront" (Green, Heyman) – 4:03
4. "Somebody Loves Me" (MacDonald, DeSylva, Gershwin) – 3:54

LP Side B

1. "I Want to Be Happy" (Caesar, Youmans) – 3:56
2. "The Man I Love" (Gershwin, Gershwin) – 4:48
3. "Mean to Me" (Ahlert, Turk) – 4:09
4. "Peg O' My Heart" (Bryan, Fisher) – 4:02

== Personnel ==
- Lester Young – tenor saxophone
- Buddy Rich – drums
- Nat King Cole (credited as "Aye Guy" on the original releases) – piano

== References / notes ==
- The Lester Young Buddy Rich Trio at jazzdisco.org
