= Buddy and Sweets =

Studio album by Harry "Sweets" Edison, Buddy Rich
- Released: 1955
- Recorded: September 1, 1955 Los Angeles
- Genre: Jazz
- Length: 38:28
- Label: Norgran
- Producer: Norman Granz

Harry "Sweets" Edison chronology
| Buddy & Sweets (1955) | Pres and Sweets (1955) |

Buddy Rich chronology
| Sing and Swing with Buddy Rich (1955) | Buddy & Sweets (1955) | The Lester Young Buddy Rich Trio (1955) |

Professional ratings
Review scores
| Source | Rating |
|---|---|
| The Penguin Guide to Jazz Recordings | 3/4 stars |

Buddy and Sweets is a jazz album recorded in Los Angeles, California in September 1955 by Harry "Sweets" Edison and Buddy Rich.

== Track listing ==
LP side A

1. "Yellow Rose of Brooklyn" (Harry "Sweets" Edison) – 4:31
2. "Easy Does It" (Sy Oliver, Trummy Young) – 8:16
3. "All Sweets" (Edison) – 2:09
4. "Nice Work If You Can Get It" (George Gershwin, Ira Gershwin) – 4:04

LP side B

1. "Barney's Bugle" (Buddy Rich) – 9:39
2. "Now's the Time" (Charlie Parker) – 4:39
3. "You're Getting to Be a Habit with Me" (Al Dubin, Harry Warren) – 5:10

== Personnel ==
- Harry Sweets Edison – trumpet
- Buddy Rich – drums
- Jimmy Rowles – piano
- Barney Kessel – guitar
- John Simmons – bass

== References / notes ==
- Norgran MGN 1038, also re-issued as Verve MGV 8129
- Buddy and Sweets (Norgran MGN 1038) at jazzdisco.org
- Buddy and Sweets at allmusic.com
- Personnel and recording dates at mosaicrecords.com
