= Vernon Alley =

American jazz bassist (1915–2004)

- Born: May 26, 1915; Winnemucca, Nevada, U.S.
- Died: October 3, 2004 (aged 89) San Francisco, California
- Genres: Jazz
- Instruments: Double bass, electric upright bass

Vernon Alley (May 26, 1915 – October 3, 2004) was an American jazz bassist.

== Early life ==
Alley was born in Winnemucca, Nevada, and played football in high school and college. His brother, Eddie Alley, was a drummer; they played together often.

== Career ==
Vernon played with Wes People in 1937 and with Saunders King until the end of the decade. He briefly led his own band in 1940.

Around 1940, while in Lionel Hampton's band, Alley switched from double bass to electric upright bass, one of the first musicians to do so. In 1942, he joined Count Basie's ensemble, where he played only for a few months and appeared in the film Reveille with Beverly.

Alley enlisted in the United States Navy as a musician in 1942 and after training at Camp Robert Smalls, he was assigned as part of a 45-piece regimental band to the Navy's PreFlight School located at Saint Mary's College of California. Others who served in this band included Ernie and Marshal Royal, Jackie Kelso, Wilbert Baranco, Earl Watkins, and Buddy Collette.

After returning to civilian life, Alley put together an ensemble in San Francisco. He continued to play there and was an active member on local radio and in civic arts into the 1990s.

== Death ==
Alley died in San Francisco 2004. In his obituary, Peter Fimrite of the San Francisco Chronicle described Alley as "the most distinguished jazz musician in San Francisco history." His daughter, Elizabeth Anne Stevens, died in 2002.
