= Rich à la Rakha =

Studio album by Buddy Rich and Alla Rakha
- Released: 1968
- Recorded: February 5, 1968
- Genre: Indian classical music
- Length: 48:39
- Label: World Pacific
- Producer: Richard Bock

Buddy Rich chronology
| The New One! (1967) | Rich à la Rakha (1968) | Mercy, Mercy (1968) |

Alla Rakha chronology
| Rich à la Rakha (1968) | Together (1990) |

Professional ratings
Review scores
| Source | Rating |
|---|---|
| AllMusic | 2/5 stars |

Rich à la Rakha is a 1968 studio album by Buddy Rich and Alla Rakha.

== Track listing ==
LP side A

1. "Khanda Kafi" (Ravi Shankar) – 5:18
2. "Duet in Dadra" (Alla Rakha, Buddy Rich) – 4:19
3. "Rangeelā" (Shankar) – 7:40

LP side B

1. "Nagma E Raksh" (Rakha) – 4:44
2. "Tal Sawari" (Rakha, Rich) – 14:30

== Personnel ==
- Buddy Rich – drums, dholak, dholki
- Alla Rakha – tabla
- Ravi Shankar – conductor
- Paul Horn – flute
- Nodu C. Mullick – tamboura, manjeera

Production

- Richard Bock – producer, audio production
- Lanky Linstrot – engineer, audio engineer
- Woody Woodward – art direction
- Gabor Halmos – design
- Collin Walcott – liner notes
