= Richcraft =

Studio album by Buddy Rich
- Released: 1959
- Recorded: April 9–10, 1959
- Genre: Jazz
- Length: 33:59
- Label: Mercury
- Producer: Jack Tracy

Buddy Rich chronology
Buddy Rich in Miami (1959)	Richcraft (1959)	Rich Versus Roach (1959)

Alternate release
- Wing Records LP cover

Alternative cover

Professional ratings
Review scores
Source	Rating
Allmusic	4/5 stars

Richcraft is a 1959 studio big band album by Buddy Rich and a big band / orchestra with arrangements by Ernie Wilkins. A nearly identical album, titled The Rich Rebellion was released by Wing Records without "I Want a Little Girl" but with two additional tracks from an April, 1960 (Septet) recording session ("That's Rich Man" and "Astronaut").

== Track listing ==
=== Richcraft ===
LP Side A

1. "Indiana (Back Home Again in Indiana)" (Ballard MacDonald, James F. Hanley) – 3:38
2. "Richcraft" (Ernie Wilkins) – 3:06
3. "Sweets Tooth" (Ernie Wilkins) – 4:01
4. "Clap Hands! Here Comes Charley!" (Ballard MacDonald, Joseph Meyer, Billy Rose) – 3:04
5. "Yardbird Suite" (Charlie Parker) – 2:59

LP Side B

1. "Cherokee (Indian Love Song)" (Ray Noble) – 4:08
2. "I Want a Little Girl" (Billy Moll, Murray Mencher) – 4:12
3. "From the Sticks" (Ernie Wilkins) – 4:42
4. "Song of the Islands" (Charles E. King) – 4:09

=== The Rich Rebellion ===
LP Side A

1. "Indiana" ("Back Home Again In Indiana") – 3:38
2. "That's Rich Man" – 5:26
3. "Sweets Tooth" – 4:01
4. "Song Of The Islands" – 4:09
5. "From The Sticks" – 4:42

LP Side B

1. "Astronaut" – 7:36
2. "Richcraft" – 3:06
3. "Yardbird Suite" – 2:59
4. "Cherokee" – 4:08
5. "Clap Hands, Here Comes Charlie" – 3:04

== Personnel ==
- Ernie Wilkins – arranger
- Buddy Rich – drums, percussion
- Phil Woods – alto saxophone
- Earle Warren – alto saxophone
- Steve Perlow – baritone saxophone
- Benny Golson – tenor saxophone
- Al Cohn – tenor saxophone
- Harry "Sweets" Edison – trumpet
- Emmett Berry – trumpet
- Joe Ferrante – trumpet
- Stan Fishelson – trumpet
- Jimmy Nottingham – trumpet
- Eddie Bert – trombone
- Billy Byers – trombone
- Jimmy Cleveland – trombone
- Willie Dennis – trombone
- John Bunch – piano
- Sam Herman – guitar
- Phil Leshin – double bass

Septet (only) on "That's Rich Man" and "Astronaut":

- Buddy Rich – drums
- Irving "Marky" Markowitz – trumpet
- Willie Dennis – trombone
- Seldon Powell – tenor saxophone
- Mike Mainieri – vibraphone
- Dave McKenna – piano
- Earl May – bass
