= Buddy Rich Band (album) =

Studio album by Buddy Rich
- Released: 1981
- Studio: Universal, Chicago
- Genre: Jazz
- Length: 36:30
- Label: MCA
- Producer: Joel Dorn

Buddy Rich chronology
Live at Ronnie Scott's (1980)	Buddy Rich Band (1981)	Live at the 1982 Montreal Jazz Festival (1982)

Buddy Rich Band is a 1981 recording made by jazz drummer Buddy Rich with his big band for MCA Records.

== Track listing ==
LP side one:

1. "Never Can Say Goodbye" (Clifton Davis) – 4:48
2. "Fantasy" (Eddie del Barrio, Maurice White, Verdine White) – 4:35
3. "Listen Here Goes Funky" (Eddie Harris) – 3:30
4. "Slow Funk" (Bob Mintzer) – 5:42

LP side two:

1. "Beulah Witch" (Don Menza) – 3:31
2. "Good News" (Mintzer) – 14:24

== Personnel ==
- Buddy Rich – leader, drums
- The Buddy Rich Band
- Harold Wheeler – arranger, co-producer
- Robert Mintzer – arranger ("Slow Funk" and "Good News")
