= Buddy Rich Just Sings =

Studio album by Buddy Rich
- Released: 1957
- Recorded: 1957
- Genre: Vocal jazz
- Length: 38:52
- Label: Verve
- Producer: Norman Granz

Buddy Rich chronology
This One's for Basie (1956)	Buddy Rich Just Sings (1957)	Buddy Rich in Miami (1958)

Professional ratings
Review scores
Source	Rating
Allmusic	3/5 stars

Buddy Rich Just Sings is a 1957 studio album by Buddy Rich, one of three vocal albums that Rich recorded. The album has also been re-issued on CD with the contents of The Voice is Rich added as 'bonus' material.

== Track listing ==
1. "Cathy" (Mel Tormé) – 3:24
2. "Between the Devil and the Deep Blue Sea" (Harold Arlen, Ted Koehler) – 4:09
3. "It's All Right with Me" (Arlen, Yip Harburg) – 2:32
4. "Over the Rainbow" (Arlen, Harburg) – 4:19
5. "You Took Advantage of Me" (Richard Rodgers, Lorenz Hart) – 3:43
6. "Can't We Be Friends?" (Paul James, Kay Swift) – 3:29
7. "It's Only a Paper Moon" (Arlen, Harburg) – 2:52
8. "My Melancholy Baby" (Ernie Burnett, George A. Norton) – 3:03
9. "Cheek to Cheek" (Irving Berlin) – 5:01
10. "It Don't Mean a Thing (If It Ain't Got That Swing)" (Duke Ellington, Irving Mills) – 3:05
11. "I Hadn't Anyone Till You" (Ray Noble) – 3:39

== Personnel ==
- Ben Webster - tenor saxophone
- Buddy Rich - vocals, drums
- Alvin Stoller - drums
- Harry "Sweets" Edison - trumpet
- Howard Roberts - guitar
- Paul Smith - piano
- Joe Mondragon - double bass
- Mike Mainieri - vibraphone
