= Krupa and Rich =

Studio album by Gene Krupa, Buddy Rich
- Released: 1956
- Recorded: 1 November 1955
- Genre: Jazz
- Length: 49:40
- Label: Clef/Verve
- Producer: Norman Granz

Gene Krupa, Buddy Rich chronology
| Krupa and Rich (1956) | Burnin' Beat (1962) |

Gene Krupa chronology
| Gene Krupa - Lionel Hampton - Teddy Wilson Play Selections From The Benny Goodman Story' | Krupa and Rich (1955) | The Exciting Gene Krupa and His Quartet |

Buddy Rich chronology
| The Wailing Buddy Rich (1955) | Krupa and Rich (1955) | The Lionel Hampton Art Tatum Buddy Rich Trio (1955) |

Professional ratings
Review scores
| Source | Rating |
|---|---|
| AllMusic | 4.5/5 stars |
| The Penguin Guide to Jazz Recordings | 3/4 stars |

Krupa and Rich is a 1956 studio album by jazz drummers Gene Krupa and Buddy Rich, released on Norman Granz' Clef Records. Krupa and Rich play on two different tracks each and play together only on "Bernie's Tune." Krupa and Rich would record again for Verve Records; their album Burnin' Beat was released in 1962.

A 1994 CD re-issue from Verve included two Buddy Rich bonus tracks.

== Track listing ==
LP side A

1. "Buddy's Blues" (Buddy Rich) – 10:27
2. "Bernie's Tune" (Bernie Miller, Jerry Leiber, Mike Stoller) – 13:54

LP side B

1. "Gene's Blues" (Gene Krupa) – 7:44
2. "Sweethearts on Parade" (Carmen Lombardo, Charles Newman) – 8:47
3. "I Never Knew" (Ted Fio Rito, Gus Kahn) – 8:51

Bonus tracks on 1994 CD re-issue

6. "Sunday" (Chester Conn, Benny Krueger, Nathan "Ned" Miller, Jule Styne) – 10:48
7. "The Monster" (Harry "Sweets" Edison) – 11:06

== Personnel ==
- Gene Krupa - drums
- Buddy Rich - drums
- Oscar Peterson - piano
- Ray Brown - double bass
- Herb Ellis - guitar
- Roy Eldridge - trumpet
- Dizzy Gillespie - trumpet
- Illinois Jacquet - tenor saxophone
- Flip Phillips - tenor saxophone, clarinet

on CD bonus tracks:

- Buddy Rich - drums
- Oscar Peterson - piano
- Ray Brown - bass
- Freddie Green - guitar
- Thad Jones - trumpet
- Joe Newman - trumpet
- Ben Webster - tenor sax
- Frank Wess - tenor & alto sax, flute
