= Mr. Drums: Buddy Rich & His Band Live on King Street, San Francisco =

1985 live album by Buddy Rich

Live album by Buddy Rich
- Released: 1986
- Recorded: 3 April 1985, San Francisco One Pass King Street Studios Soundstage
- Genre: Jazz
- Length: 102:26
- Label: Cafe (Mobile Fidelity)

Buddy Rich chronology
Rich and Famous (1983)	Mr. Drums: Buddy Rich & His Band Live on King Street, San Francisco (1986)

Professional ratings
Review scores
Source	Rating
Allmusic	4.5/5 stars

Mr. Drums: Buddy Rich and His Band Live on King Street, The Channel One Set

Video by Buddy Rich
- Recorded: 3 April 1985
- Genre: Jazz
- Label: Pioneer Artists, Sony

Buddy Rich and His Band: The Lost West Side Story Tapes

Video by Buddy Rich
- Recorded: 3 April 1985
- Genre: Jazz
- Label: Hudson Music, Lightyear

Mr. Drums: Buddy Rich & His Band Live on King Street, San Francisco is a 1985 recording made by jazz drummer Buddy Rich and his Big Band. It is the final album released during Rich's lifetime.

== Release history ==
A three-LP and two-CD audio album was initially released by Cafe Records (a division of Mobile Fidelity Sound Lab), and a video of the "Channel One" set was released by Pioneer Video (LaserDisc) and Sony (videocassette). The Channel One set was eventually re-issued on DVD as were the remaining tracks (the West Side Story set aka "The Lost Tapes").

== Track listing ==
=== 3 LP release ===
Disc 1, side A:

1. "Machine" (Reddie) – 3:14
2. "Best Coast" (LaBarbera) – 3:57
3. "One O'Clock Jump" (Basie) – 7:49
4. "Sophisticated Lady" (Ellington, Mills) – 5:17

Disc 1, side B:

1. "Norwegian Wood (This Bird Has Flown)" (Lennon, McCartney) – 3:15
2. "Love for Sale" (Porter) – 4:05
3. "No Exit" (Cunliffe) – 6:44

Disc 2, side A:

1. "Mexicali Nose" (Betts) – 2:58
2. "Willowcrest" (Bob Florence) – 4:21
3. "'Round Midnight" (Hanighen, Monk, Williams) – 5:34
4. "Cotton Tail" – (Ellington) – 4:59

Disc 2, side B:

1. "New Blues" (Piestrup) – 7:28
2. "Tee Bag" (Mainieri) – 6:10
3. "The Red Snapper" (Shew) – 4:50

Disc 3, side A:

1. "Channel One Suite" (Reddie) – 16:14

Disc 3, side B:

1. "West Side Story" (Overture and Medley) (Bernstein, Sondheim) – 15:31

=== 2 CD release ===
Disc 1 (The "Channel One Suite" set)

1. "Machine" (Reddie) – 3:14
2. "Best Coast" (LaBarbera) – 3:57
3. "One O' Clock Jump" (Basie) – 7:49
4. "Sophisticated Lady" (Ellington, Mills) – 5:17
5. "Norwegian Wood" (Lennon, McCartney) – 3:15
6. "Love For Sale" (Porter) – 4:05
7. "No Exit" (Cunliffe) – 6:44
8. "Channel One Suite" (Reddie) – 16:14

Disc 2 (The "West Side Story" set)

1. "Mexicali Nose" (Betts) – 2:58
2. "Willowcrest" (Florence) – 4:21
3. "'Round Midnight" (Hanighen, Monk, Williams) – 5:34
4. "Cotton Tail" – (Ellington) – 4:59
5. "New Blues" (Piestrup) – 7:28
6. "Tee Bag" (Mainieri) – 6:10
7. "The Red Snapper" (Shew) – 4:50
8. "West Side Story" (Overture and Medley) (Bernstein, Sondheim) – 15:31

=== Video releases ===
- Mr. Drums: Buddy Rich and His Band Live on King Street, The Channel One Set aka ...The Channel One Suite

(musical number contents same as Disc 1 of the CD release)

- Buddy Rich and His Band: The Lost West Side Story Tapes aka ...The Lost Tapes

(musical number contents same as Disc 2 of the CD release)

== Personnel ==
- Buddy Rich – drums
- Dave Carpenter – bass guitar
- Bill Cunliffe – piano
- Steve Marcus – tenor saxophone, soprano saxophone
- Brian Sjoerdinga – tenor saxophone, flute
- Bob Bowlby – alto saxophone, flute
- Mark Pinto – alto saxophone, flute
- Jay Craig – baritone saxophone
- Paul Phillips – trumpet, flugelhorn
- Joe Kaminski – trumpet, flugelhorn
- Michael Lewis – trumpet, flugelhorn
- Eric Miyashiro – trumpet, flugelhorn
- Scott Bliege – trombone
- Michael Davis – trombone
- Jim Martin – trombone
