= The Swinging Buddy Rich =

Studio album by Buddy Rich
- Released: 1954
- Recorded: Los Angeles 1953 August 21 (tracks 1–3), 1954 August 27 (tracks 4–6), 1955 August 26 (tracks 7, 8), 1955 September 1 (track 9)
- Genre: Jazz
- Length: 24:50 (initial 10" release)
- Label: Norgran
- Producer: Norman Granz

Buddy Rich chronology
The Flip Phillips Buddy Rich Trio (1953)	The Swinging Buddy Rich (1954)	Sing and Swing with Buddy Rich (1955)

The Swinging Buddy Rich is a jazz album of songs recorded in Los Angeles in 1953 and 1954 by Buddy Rich with Harry "Sweets" Edison and others. The first 6 tracks were released on a 10-inch Norgran Records LP in 1954. An expanded 12 inch Norgran LP version with 3 additional tracks from 1955 was later released.

== Track listing ==
1. "Let's Fall in Love" (Harold Arlen, Ted Koehler) – 2:50
2. "Me and My Jaguar" (Rich) – 3:48
3. "Just Blues" (Edison, Rich) – 6:27
4. "Sweets' Opus No. 1" (Edison) – 2:37
5. "Strike It Rich" (Johnny Mandel) – 6:32
6. "Sportin' Life" ("Sweetie Pie") (Edison) – 2:36
7. "Sonny and Sweets" (Rich, Edison) – 4:42
8. "The Two Mothers" (Rich, Edison) – 6:01
9. "Willow Weep for Me" (Ann Ronell) – 7:02

tracks 1–3 = side A of the original 10" LP release (Norgran MGN 26)
tracks 4–6 = side B of the original release

== Personnel ==
tracks 1–3 (recorded 1953):

- Buddy Rich – drums
- Harry "Sweets" Edison – trumpet
- John Simmons – bass
- Jimmy Rowles – piano
- Benny Carter – alto saxophone
- Georgie Auld – tenor saxophone
- Bob Lawson – baritone saxophone
- Milt Bernhardt – trombone
- Johnny Mandel – arranger

tracks 4–6 (recorded 1954):

- Buddy Rich – drums
- Harry "Sweets" Edison – trumpet
- Joe Comfort – bass
- Gerald Wiggins – piano
- Willie Smith – alto saxophone
- Tom Brown – tenor saxophone
- Bob Poland – baritone saxophone
- Milt Bernhardt – trombone
- Jack Costanzo – bongos

tracks 7–9 (recorded 1955):

- Buddy Rich – drums
- Harry "Sweets" Edison – trumpet
- John Simmons – bass
- Jimmy Rowles – piano
- Sonny Criss – alto saxophone (tracks 7, 8)
- Barney Kessel – guitar (track 9)
