= Stanley Turrentine =

American jazz saxophonist and record producer (1934–2000)

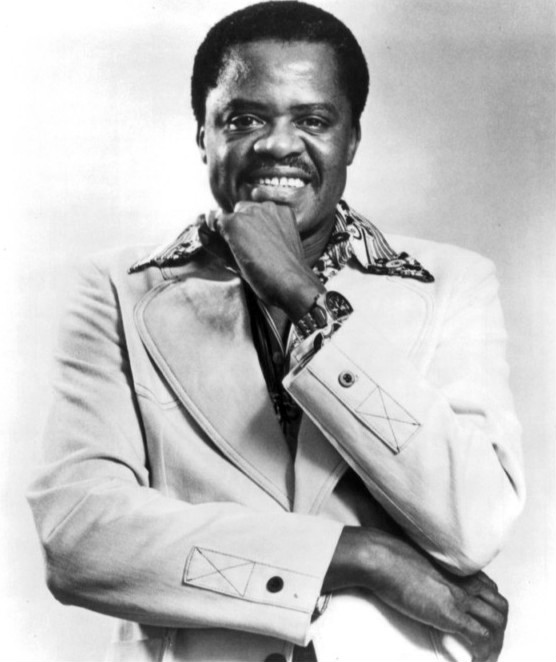
- Turrentine in 1976

Background information
- Born: Stanley William Turrentine; April 5, 1934; Pittsburgh, Pennsylvania, U.S.
- Died: September 12, 2000 (aged 66) New York City, U.S.
- Genres: Jazz; soul jazz; jazz fusion
- Occupations: Musician; record producer
- Instrument: Tenor saxophone
- Works: Discography
- Years active: 1959–2000
- Labels: Blue Note; Fantasy; CTI; Prestige; Impulse!; MusicMasters
- Spouse: Shirley Scott (m. 1960; div. 1971) Rita Da Costa (m. 1984)

Stanley William Turrentine (/ˈtɜːr.ɪnˌtiːn/ TUR-in-TEEN; April 5, 1934 – September 12, 2000), nicknamed Mr. T, was an American Grammy-nominated jazz tenor saxophonist and record producer. He began his career playing R&B for Earl Bostic and, later, recording soul jazz for the Blue Note label from 1960, touching on jazz fusion during a stint on CTI in the 1970s. He was described by the critic Steve Huey as "renowned for his distinctively thick, rippling tone [and] earthy grounding in the blues." In the 1960s, Turrentine was married to organist Shirley Scott, with whom he frequently recorded, and he was the younger brother of trumpeter Tommy Turrentine, with whom he also recorded.

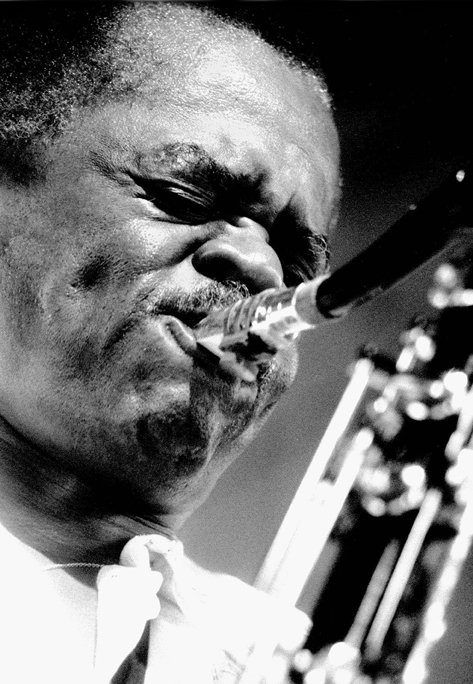
Turrentine at Bach Dancing & Dynamite Society, Half Moon Bay, California, August 13, 1989

== Biography ==
Turrentine was born in Pittsburgh's Hill District, Pennsylvania, and was raised at 908 Bryn Mawr Road, Pittsburgh, in the third-floor apartment, into a musical family. His father, Thomas Turrentine Sr., was a saxophonist with Al Cooper's Savoy Sultans, his mother played stride piano, and his older brother, Tommy Turrentine, was a trumpet player.

He began his prolific career with blues and rhythm and blues bands and was at first greatly influenced by Illinois Jacquet. He first toured with Lowell Fulson's band in 1951, at the age of 17, and, in 1953, Earl Bostic asked him to join his band, replacing John Coltrane. Turrentine also played in groups led by the pianist and composer Tadd Dameron.

Turrentine received his only formal musical training during his military stint in the mid-1950s. In 1959, he left the military and went straight into the band of the drummer Max Roach.

He married the organist Shirley Scott in 1960, and the two frequently played and recorded together. In the 1960s, he started working with organist Jimmy Smith and made many soul jazz recordings both with Smith and as a leader. Scott and Turrentine divorced in 1971.

Turrentine turned to jazz fusion and signed for Creed Taylor's CTI label. His first album for CTI, Sugar, recorded in 1970, proved one of his biggest successes and a seminal recording for the label, closely followed by Don't Mess with Mister T. (1973). He worked with Freddie Hubbard, Milt Jackson, George Benson, Bob James, Richard Tee, Idris Muhammad, Ron Carter, Grant Green, and Eric Gale. He returned to playing soul jazz in the 1980s, into the 1990s.

In 1984, Turrentine married the jazz singer, song stylist, and vocal coach Rita Da Costa. He lived in Fort Washington, Maryland, from the early 1990s until his death.

He died of a stroke in New York City on September 12, 2000, aged 66, and was buried in Pittsburgh's Allegheny Cemetery.

== Accolades ==
=== Grammy Awards ===
The Grammy Awards are awarded annually by the National Academy of Recording Arts and Sciences. Turrentine has received a total of three nominations.

Year	Category	Nominated work	Result
1976	Best R&B Instrumental Performance	"Hope That We Can Be Together Soon" (single)	Nominated
1979	Best Jazz Fusion Performance, Vocal or Instrumental	Betcha (album)	Nominated
1987	Best R&B Instrumental Performance (Orchestra, Group or Soloist)	"Boogie On Reggae Woman" (track)	Nominated
