= Rich and Famous (album) =

Studio album by Buddy Rich
- Released: 1983
- Studio: HMC Studios, Charlotte, North Carolina
- Genre: Jazz
- Length: 35:29
- Label: Amway
- Producer: Alan Kaufman, John La Barbera

Buddy Rich chronology
Live at the 1982 Montreal Jazz Festival (1982)	Rich and Famous (1983)	Mr. Drums: Live on King Street... (1985)

Alternate cover / title
- HMC Records release

Alternate cover / title
- Synergie OMP digital release

Alternate cover
- Synergie OMP digital release

Rich and Famous is a recording made by jazz drummer Buddy Rich released in 1983. Originally released by Amway in the United States, it has since been re-issued under different titles by different labels (The Magic of Buddy Rich (HMC Records), Buddy Rich, The Man (Synergie OMP), ...).

== Track listing ==
LP side A:

1. "Red Snapper" (Bobby Shew) – 4:34
2. "Time Will Tell" (Joe Roccisano) – 5:07
3. "Ballad Of The Matador" (Frank Strazzeri) – 5:23
4. "Dancing Men" (Pat LaBarbera) – 4:59

LP side B:

1. "Cotton Tail" (Duke Ellington) – 5:05
2. "My One and Only Love" (Guy Wood, Robert Mellin) – 5:34
3. "Manhattan: The City/Central Park" (Dave Panichi) – 4:47

== Personnel ==
- Buddy Rich – leader, drums
- The Buddy Rich Big Band:
  - Trumpets: Doug Clark, Dana Watson, Andy Gravish, Jeff Folkens
  - Trombones: Dave Panichi, Mike Davis, George Gesslein (bass trb.)
  - Alto Sax: Mark Lopeman, Olivier Peters
  - Tenor Sax: Steve Marcus, Andy Sterman
  - Bari Sax: Keith Bishop
  - Piano: Lee Musiker
  - Bass: Dave Carpenter
