= Gene Krupa =

American jazz drummer and bandleader (1909–1973)

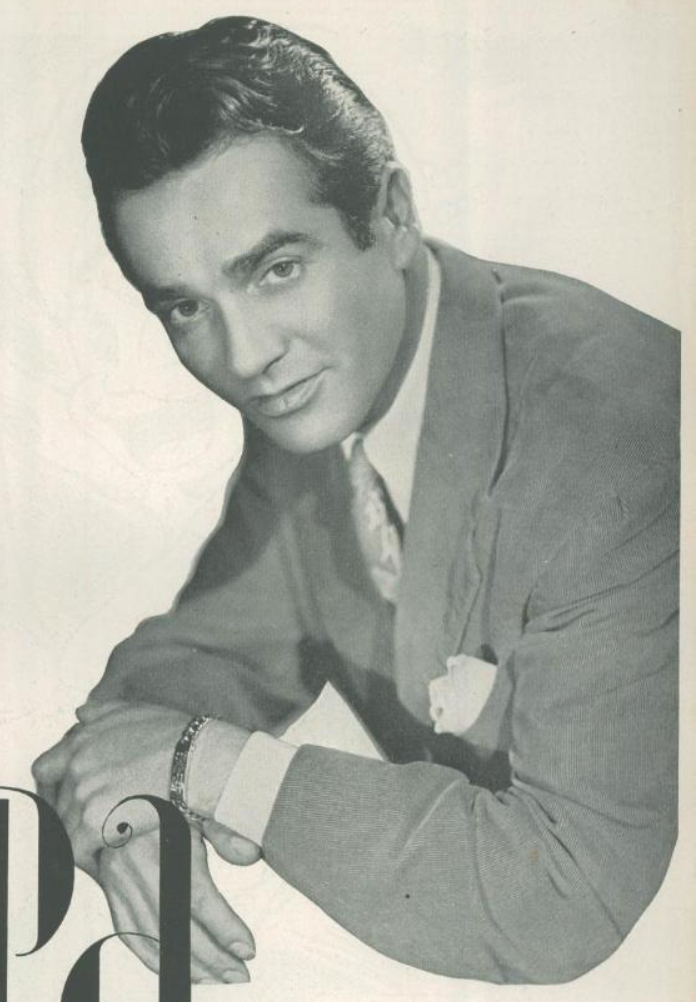
- Krupa in 1944

Background information
- Born: Eugene Bertram Krupa; January 15, 1909; Chicago, Illinois, U.S.
- Died: October 16, 1973 (aged 64) Yonkers, New York, U.S.
- Genres: Dixieland; jazz; swing
- Occupations: Musician; bandleader; composer
- Instruments: Drums
- Years active: 1927–1973
- Formerly of: Chicago Rhythm Kings; Red Nichols and His Five Pennies; Benny Goodman; Tommy Dorsey

Eugene Bertram Krupa (January 15, 1909 – October 16, 1973) was an American jazz drummer, bandleader, and composer. Krupa is widely regarded as one of the most influential drummers in the history of popular music. His drum solo on Benny Goodman's 1937 recording of "Sing, Sing, Sing" elevated the role of the drummer from that of an accompanist to that of an important solo voice in the band.

In collaboration with the Slingerland drum and Zildjian cymbal manufacturers, he became a major force in defining the standard band-drummer's kit. Modern Drummer magazine regards Krupa as "the founding father of modern drumset playing".

Upon his death, The New York Times labeled Krupa a "revolutionary" known for "frenzied, flashy" drumming, with his work having generated a significant musical legacy that started "in jazz and has continued on through the rock era".

== Early life ==
Krupa was born in Chicago, the youngest of Anna (née Oslowski) and Bartłomiej Krupa's nine children. M. Bartłomiej was an immigrant from Poland born in the village of Łęki Górne, southeastern Poland. Anna was born in Shamokin, Pennsylvania, and was also of Polish descent. His parents were Roman Catholics who groomed him for the priesthood. He spent his grammar school days at parochial schools. He attended James H. Bowen High School on Chicago's southeast side. After graduation, he attended Saint Joseph's College for a year but decided the priesthood was not his vocation.

Krupa studied with Sanford A. Moeller, and began playing drums professionally in the mid-1920s with bands in Wisconsin. In 1927, he was hired by MCA to become a member of Thelma Terry and her Playboys, the first notable American jazz band to be led by a female musician (except all-female bands). The Playboys were the house band at the Golden Pumpkin nightclub in Chicago and toured throughout the eastern and central United States.

== Career ==
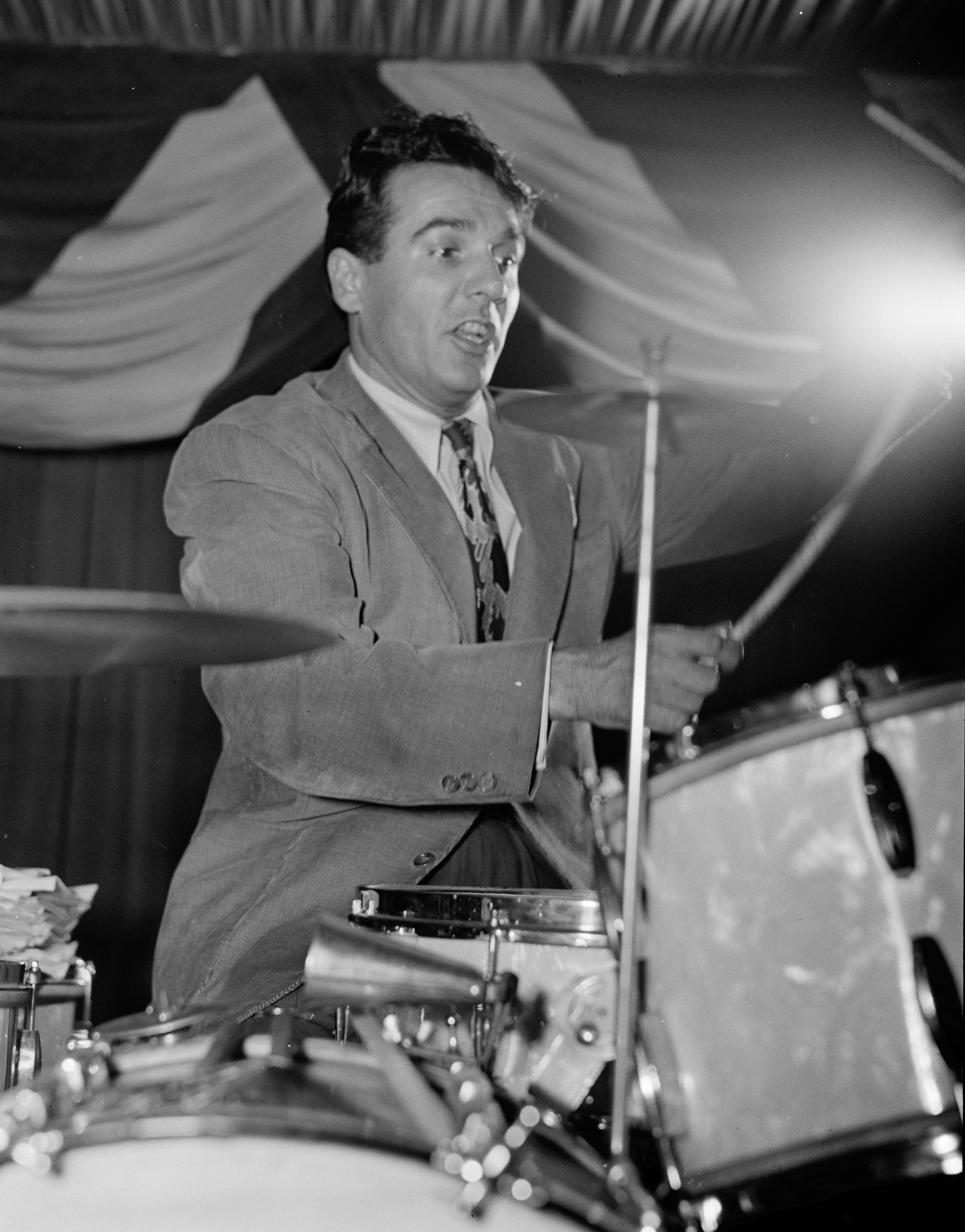
Krupa performing in New York City, 1946

Krupa made his first recordings in 1927 with a band under the leadership of Red McKenzie and guitarist Eddie Condon. Along with other recordings by musicians from the Chicago jazz scene, such as Bix Beiderbecke, these recordings are examples of Chicago-style jazz. Krupa's influences during this time included Father Ildefonse Rapp and Roy Knapp (both teachers of his), and drummers Tubby Hall, Zutty Singleton, and Baby Dodds. Press rolls (dragging one stick across the snare head while keeping the beat with the other stick) were a fairly common technique in the early stages of his development. Many other drummers (Ray Bauduc, Chick Webb, George Wettling, Dave Tough) influenced his approach to drumming, and other instrumentalists and composers such as Frederick Delius influenced his approach to music.

Krupa appeared on six recordings by the Thelma Terry band in 1928. In December 1934, he joined Benny Goodman's band, where his drum work made him a national celebrity. His tom-tom interludes on the hit "Sing, Sing, Sing" were the first extended drum solos to be recorded commercially. Conflict with Goodman, though, prompted him to leave the group and form his own orchestra shortly after the Carnegie Hall concert in January 1938. He appeared in the 1941 film Ball of Fire, in which his band and he performed an extended version of the hit "Drum Boogie" (composed by Krupa and Roy Eldridge), sung by Martha Tilton and lip-synced by Barbara Stanwyck.

In 1943, Krupa was arrested on a falsified marijuana (cannabis) drug charge; this resulted in a short jail sentence and the breakup of his orchestra. After Krupa broke up his orchestra, he returned to Goodman's band for a few months. When Goodman wanted him to go on a West Coast tour, Krupa declined. He then joined Tommy Dorsey's band for several months and put together his next orchestra. He performed an uncredited drum riff in a montage sequence in the 1946 Oscar-winning movie The Best Years of Our Lives.

As the 1940s ended, Count Basie closed his band and Woody Herman reduced his band to an octet. In 1951, Krupa cut down the size of his band to 10 pieces for a short while. From 1952 on, he led trios then quartets, often with Charlie Ventura then Eddie Shu on tenor sax, clarinet, and harmonica. He appeared regularly in the Jazz at the Philharmonic concerts. In the 1950s, Krupa returned to Hollywood to appear in the films The Glenn Miller Story and The Benny Goodman Story. In 1959, the movie biography The Gene Krupa Story was released; Sal Mineo portrayed Krupa, and the film included cameos by Anita O'Day and Red Nichols.

During the 1950s and 1960s, Krupa often played at the Metropole near Times Square in Manhattan, and by 1956, his recordings were showcased on national radio networks by Ben Selvin within the RCA Thesaurus transcriptions library. He continued to perform in famous clubs in the 1960s, including the Showboat Lounge in northwest Washington, D.C. With peer Cozy Cole, Krupa started a music school in 1954 that carried on into the 1960s. Some of the school's students included Peter Criss of KISS and Jerry Nolan of the New York Dolls. Doug Clifford of Creedence Clearwater Revival cited Krupa as an inspiration.

Krupa was still busy in the early 1970s until shortly before his death, including several reunion concerts of the original Benny Goodman Quartette. On April 17, 1973, the Gene Krupa Quartet, composed of Eddie Shu (tenor and clarinet), John Bunch (piano), Nabil Totah (bass), and Krupa (drums), recorded a live performance at the New School featuring the Louis Prima composition "Sing, Sing, Sing".

Krupa compositions he wrote or co-wrote include "Some Like It Hot" in 1939, "Drum Boogie", "Boogie Blues", his theme song "Apurksody", "Ball of Fire", "Disc Jockey Jump" with Gerry Mulligan, "Wire Brush Stomp", "Hippdeebip", "Krupa's Wail", "Swing Is Here", "Quiet and Roll 'Em" with Sam Donahue, "Bolero at the Savoy", "Murdy Purdy", and "How 'Bout That Mess".

=== Krupa-Rich drum battles ===
Norman Granz hired Krupa and drummer Buddy Rich for his Jazz at the Philharmonic concerts. The two drummers performed at Carnegie Hall in September 1952, and it was issued by Verve as The Drum Battle. The two drummers faced off in a number of television broadcasts and other venues and often played similar duets with drummer Cozy Cole. Krupa and Rich recorded two studio albums together: Krupa and Rich (Verve, 1955) and Burnin' Beat (Verve, 1962).

== Personal life ==
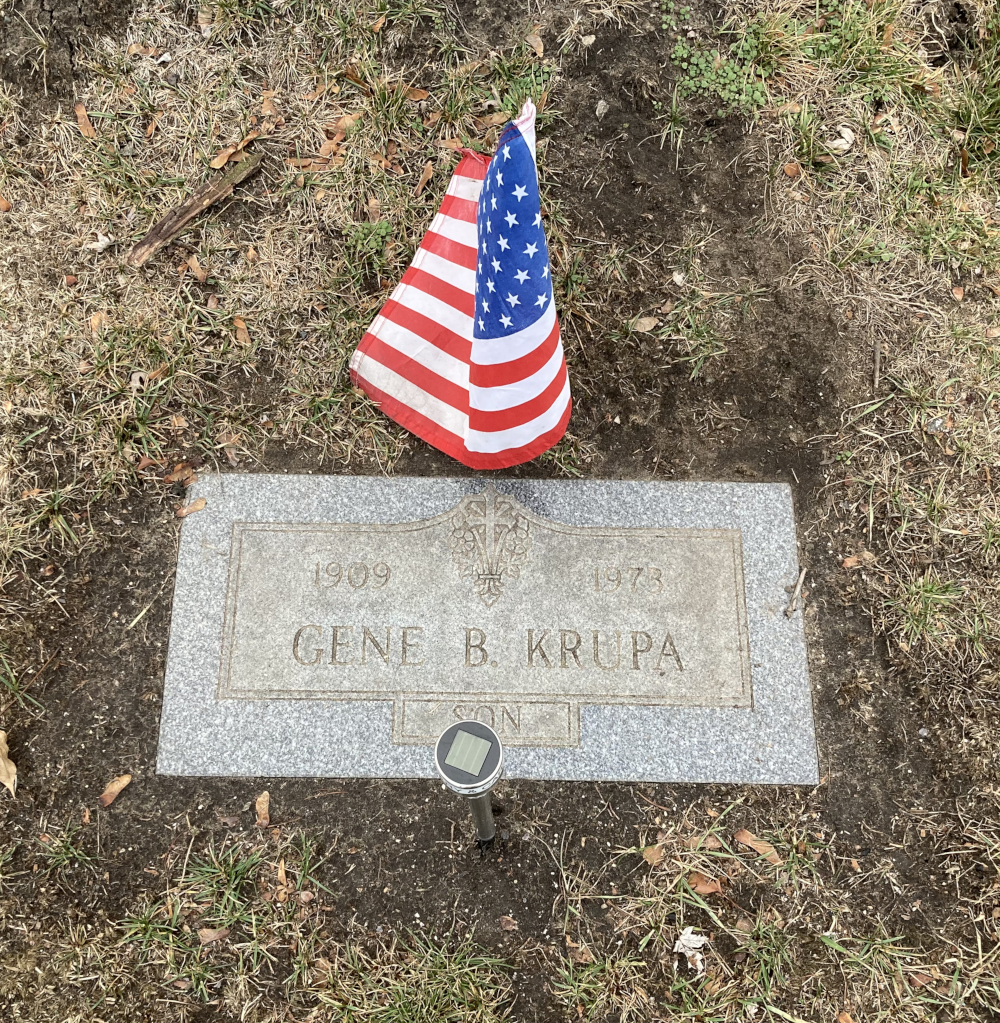
Krupa's grave at Holy Cross Cemetery

Krupa married Ethel Maguire twice; their first marriage lasted from 1934 to 1942 and the second from 1946 to her death in 1955. He remarried in 1959 to Patty Bowler, but they were divorced within 10 years.

In the early 1970s, Krupa's house in Yonkers, New York, was damaged by fire. He continued to live in the parts of the house that were habitable.

In 1973, Krupa died in Yonkers at age 64 from heart failure, though he also had leukemia and emphysema. He is buried in Holy Cross Cemetery in Calumet City, Illinois.

== Endorsement ==
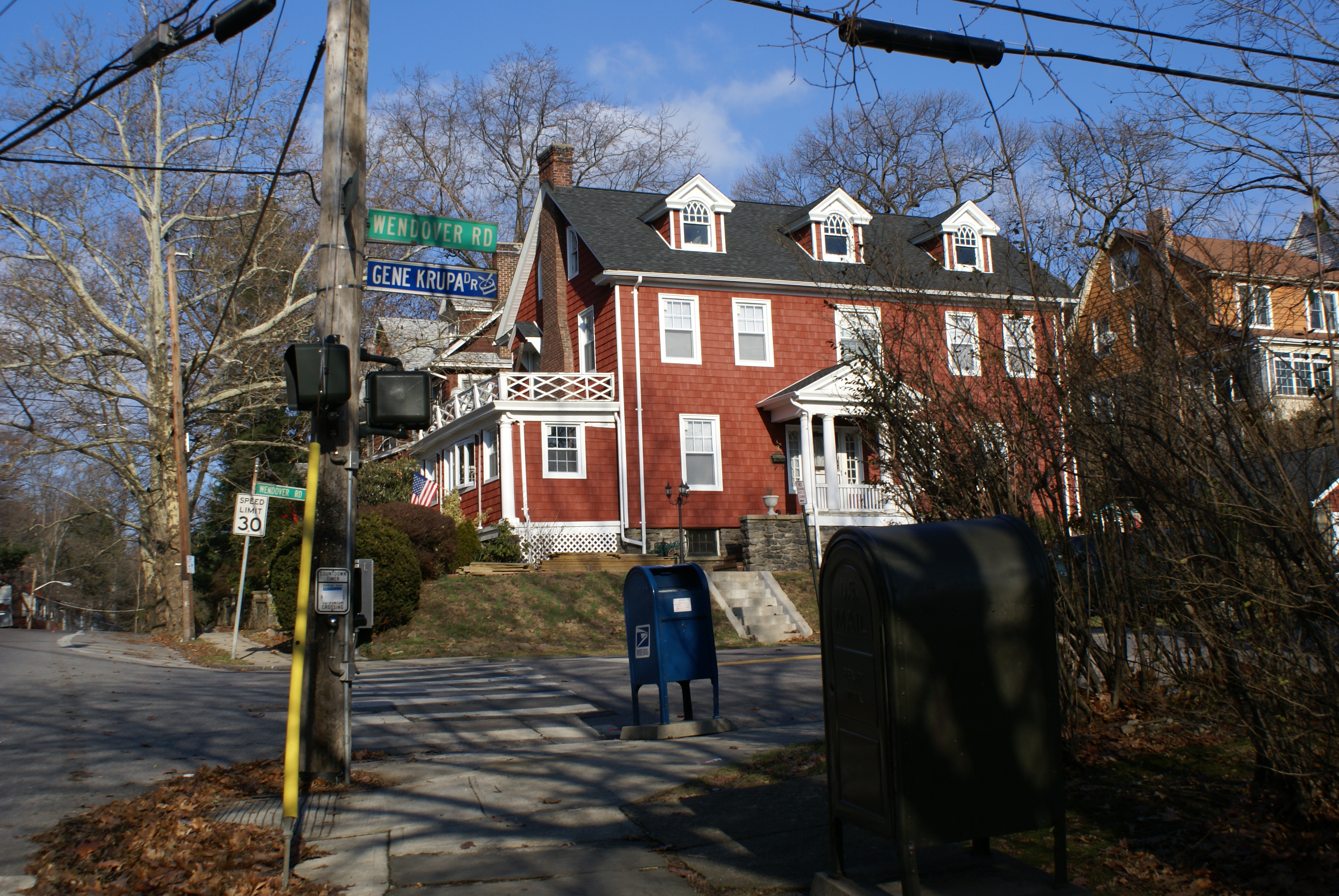
Gene Krupa Drive in Yonkers, New York

In the 1930s, Krupa became the first endorser of Slingerland drums. At Krupa's urging, Slingerland developed tom-toms with tuneable top and bottom heads, which immediately became important elements of virtually every drummer's setup. Krupa developed and popularized many of the cymbal techniques that became standard. His collaboration with Avedis Zildjian developed the modern hi-hat cymbals and standardized the names and uses of the ride cymbal, crash cymbal, and splash cymbal. He is also credited with helping to formulate the modern drum set, being one of the first jazz drummers to use a bass drum in a recording session in December 1927. One of his bass drums, a Slingerland 14×26, inscribed with Benny Goodman and Krupa's initials, is preserved at the Smithsonian Institution in Washington, D.C.

== Awards and honors ==
In 1978, Krupa became the first drummer inducted into the Modern Drummer Hall of Fame. The 1937 recording of Louis Prima's "Sing, Sing, Sing (With a Swing)" combined with Fats Waller's "Christopher Columbus" by Benny Goodman and His Orchestra featuring Krupa on drums, was inducted into the Grammy Hall of Fame in 1982.

Apollo 440's 1996 hit single "Krupa" is a tribute to Gene Krupa.

== Legacy and posthumous information ==
Roy Knapp affirmed: "There is not a professional drummer, percussionist, or other instrumentalist who does not in some way owe something and should be grateful to Gene Krupa for his imaginative and creative contributions in the modern drum techniques and styles in performance that we are using today". Buddy Rich, who cited Krupa as one of his biggest influences, stated: "Gene Krupa was the beginning and the 'end' of all drummers". He's a great genius – a truly great genius of the drums. Gene discovered things that could be done with the drums that hadn't been done before, ever. ... Before Gene, the drums were in the background, just a part of the band. To put it in plainer terms, the drums didn't have much – meaning. Along comes Gene and the drums take on meaning and they're out of the background. The drummer becomes somebody ... Gene gets credit for making people aware of the drummer – of what he's doing and why he's doing it and he deserves every bit of that credit". Jim Chapin defined him as "a charismatic figure that made the public fully conscious of drummers".

Music critics such as Charles Waring have remarked that Krupa's methods of performing, particularly his flamboyant charisma and use of solos, evolved into the approach taken by rock drummers such as John Bonham, Bill Ward and Keith Moon. Both Ian Paice and Carl Palmer claimed they started to play the drums at an early age after listening to Krupa. Guitarist Dick Dale, who also played percussion in his early days, was a Krupa fan and said his guitar sound and rhythm came from Krupa's drumming.

== Discography ==
=== As leader ===
- 1946 Drummin' With Krupa (Columbia)
- 1947 Gene Krupa And His Orchestra (Columbia)
- 1948 Gene Krupa (Columbia)
- 1950 Gene Krupa Plays "Fats" Waller For Dancing (Columbia)
- 1952 The Original Drum Battle (Verve)
- 1952 The Drum Battle with Buddy Rich (Verve)
- 1953 Timme Rosenkrantz' 1945 Concert Vol. 3 (Commodore)
- 1953 The Exciting Gene Krupa
- 1954 Sing, Sing, Sing (Verve)
- 1954 The Driving Gene Krupa (Verve)
- 1954 Gene Krupa, Vol. 1 (Clef)
- 1954 Gene Krupa, Vol. 2 (Clef)
- 1955 The Jazz Rhythms of Gene Krupa (Verve)
- 1955 G. Krupa-L. Hampton-T. Wilson (Verve)
- 1955 The Gene Krupa Quartet (Clef)
- 1956 Drummer Man (Verve)
- 1956 Krupa and Rich (Verve)
- 1957 Krupa Rocks (Verve)
- 1959 Big Noise from Winnetka (Commodore)
- 1959 Plays Gerry Mulligan Arrangements (Verve)
- 1959 Hey...Here's Gene Krupa (Verve)
- 1959 The Gene Krupa Story (Verve)
- 1961 Percussion King (Verve)
- 1962 Burnin' Beat with Buddy Rich (Verve)
- 1962 Classics in Percussion! (Verve)
- 1963 The Mighty Two with Louis Bellson (Roulette)
- 1964 The Great New Gene Krupa Quartet Featuring Charlie Ventura (Verve)
- 1972 Jazz at the New School (Chiaroscuro)

=== As sideman ===
With Benny Goodman

- 1950 Live at Carnegie Hall (1938)
- 1955 The Benny Goodman Story, Vols. 1-2
- 1956 The King of Swing, Vol. 2
- 1956 Trio Quartet Quintet
- 1997 The Complete RCA Victor Small Group Recordings (RCA Victor, 1935-39 [1997])
