= Burnin' Beat =

Studio album by Buddy Rich and Gene Krupa
- Released: 1962
- Recorded: January 18–19, 1962
- Genre: Jazz
- Length: 33:26
- Label: Verve
- Producer: Norman Granz

Buddy Rich and Gene Krupa chronology
Blues Caravan (1962)	Burnin' Beat (1962)	Are You Ready for This? (1965)

Gene Krupa chronology
Percussion King (1961)	Burnin' Beat (1962)	The Mighty Two (1962)

Professional ratings
Review scores
Source	Rating
Allmusic	3/5 stars
New Record Mirror	3/5 stars

Burnin' Beat is a 1962 studio album by drummers Buddy Rich and Gene Krupa, the sequel to their 1955 album Krupa and Rich.

== Track listing ==
LP side A

1. "Jumpin' at the Woodside" (Count Basie) – 2:20
2. "It Don't Mean a Thing (If It Ain't Got That Swing)" (Duke Ellington, Irving Mills) – 2:35
3. "Duet" – 4:32
4. "Night Train" (Oscar Washington / James R Forrest / Lewin C Simpkins) – 3:21
5. "King Porter Stomp" (Jelly Roll Morton) – 3:24

LP side B

1. "Perdido" (Ervin Drake, Hans J. Lengsfelder, Juan Tizol) – 2:24
2. "Evolution" – 9:20
3. "Hawaiian War Chant" (Ralph Freed, Leleiohaku, Ray Noble) – 5:30

== Personnel ==
- Gene Krupa – drums
- Buddy Rich – drums
- Danny Bank – flute
- John Bunch – piano
- Don Goldie – trumpet
- Al Stewart – trumpet
- Norman Granz – producer
- Nick Travis – trumpet
- Joe Wilder – trumpet
