= The Wailing Buddy Rich =

Studio album by Buddy Rich
- Released: 1956
- Recorded: 1955
- Genre: Jazz
- Label: Norgran
- Producer: Norman Granz

Buddy Rich chronology
| The Lester Young Buddy Rich Trio (1955) | The Wailing Buddy Rich (1956) | Krupa and Rich (1956) |

Professional ratings
Review scores
| Source | Rating |
|---|---|
| AllMusic | 3/5 stars |

The Wailing Buddy Rich is an album by jazz drummer Buddy Rich, released in 1956 on Norgran Records. The first two tracks were recorded on May 16, 1955, in New York; the remaining tracks were recorded with different personnel in Los Angeles on August 26.

== Track listing ==
LP Side A

1. "The Monster"
2. "Sunday"

LP Side B

1. "Smooth One"
2. "Broadway"

== Personnel ==
Side A

- Thad Jones – trumpet
- Joe Newman – trumpet
- Ben Webster – tenor saxophone
- Frank Wess – tenor saxophone
- Oscar Peterson – piano
- Freddie Green – guitar
- Ray Brown – bass
- Buddy Rich – drums

Side B

- Sonny Criss – alto saxophone
- Harry Edison – trumpet
- Jimmy Rowles – piano
- John Simmons – bass
- Buddy Rich – drums
