= Together Again: For the First Time =

Studio album by Mel Tormé, Buddy Rich
- Released: 1978
- Recorded: January 1978, New York City, New York
- Genre: Jazz
- Length: 32:52
- Label: Century Records, Gryphon Records
- Producer: Norman Schwartz

Mel Tormé chronology
Tormé: A New Album (1977)	Together Again: For the First Time (1978)	Mel Tormé and Friends. Recorded Live at Marty's New York City (1980)

Buddy Rich chronology
Class of '78 (1977)	Together Again: For the First Time (1978)	Live at Ronnie Scott's (1980)

Alternative cover
- Gryphon / RCA cover artwork

Alternative cover / title
- 1999 CD re-issue

Professional ratings
Review scores
Source	Rating
Allmusic	4/5 stars
Allmusic	4.5/5 stars
DownBeat	4.5/5 stars

Together Again: For the First Time is a 1978 studio album by Mel Tormé and Buddy Rich. Originally recorded and released as a direct-to-disc LP album, it was re-issued in 1999 as When I Found You by Hindsight Records with two additional Buddy Rich Big Band instrumental tracks from the same era.

Though they had been friends for a long time, Tormé and Rich had not recorded together until this album.

== Direct-to-disc recording session ==
In the book Traveling Music, Neil Peart (best known as the drummer for Rush) stated that each side of the album was recorded in a single take directly to the master LP, which was a throwback to recording techniques of an earlier era. Not only did the mixing need to be correct, but if a musician would make a mistake, they had to re-record from the first song. Occasionally, the musicians would hear the command "take it from the top" and start the song they had been playing, instead of starting from the first song. This restart occasionally caused some confusion among the musicians who normally respond to that command by restarting the song instead of the album.

== Reception ==
DownBeat gave the album 4.5 stars. Reviewer Chuck Berg wrote, "Torme, whose nonpareil musicality and mellow grittiness put him at the top of his league, turns in remarkable performances as singer and arranger . . . Adding their own superb embellishments are altoist Phil Woods and pianist Hank Jones. It's a class act all the way round".

== Track listing ==
=== Original LP ===
Side A

1. "When I Found You" (Michael Randall) – 3:18
2. "Here's That Rainy Day" (Johnny Burke, Jimmy Van Heusen) – 4:56
3. "Blues in the Night" (Harold Arlen, Johnny Mercer) – 8:05

Side B

1. "Bluesette" (Norman Gimbel, Toots Thielemans) – 3:30
2. "You Are the Sunshine of My Life" (Stevie Wonder) – 4:30
3. "I Won't Last a Day Without You" (Roger Nichols, Paul Williams) – 3:56
4. "Oh, Lady be Good!" (George Gershwin, Ira Gershwin) – 4:37

=== CD re-issue, When I Found You ===
1. "When I Found You" (Randall) – 3:14
2. "Here's That Rainy Day" (Burke, Van Heusen) – 4:55
3. "Cape Verdean Blues" (Horace Silver) – 6:12 (instrumental bonus track)
4. "Blues in the Night" (Arlen, Mercer) – 8:02
5. "Bluesette" (Gimbel, Thielemans) – 3:42
6. "You Are the Sunshine of My Life" (Wonder) – 4:41
7. "Funk City Ola" (Barry Mintzer) – 4:27 (instrumental bonus track)
8. "I Won't Last a Day Without You" (Nichols, Williams) – 4:28
9. "Oh, Lady Be Good" (Gershwin, Gershwin) – 4:12

== Personnel ==
- Mel Tormé – vocals, arranger
- Buddy Rich – drums
- Phil Woods – alto saxophone (track 2)
- The Buddy Rich Big Band:
  - Hank Jones – piano
  - Tom Warrington – double bass
  - Chuck Schmidt – trumpet
  - Dean Pratt
  - John Marshall
  - Dave Kennedy
  - John Mosca – trombone
  - Dale Kirkland
  - Dave Boyle
  - Tony Price – tuba
  - Chuck Wilson – saxophone
  - Alan Vu Gauvin
  - Steve Marcus - tenor saxophone
  - Gary Pribeck
  - Greg Smith
