= Buddy Rich in Miami =

Live album by Buddy Rich
- Released: 1958
- Recorded: May or June 1957, The Dream Bar at Johnina Hotel, Miami Beach
- Genre: Jazz
- Length: 40:53
- Label: Verve
- Producer: Norman Granz

Buddy Rich chronology
Buddy Rich Just Sings (1957)	Buddy Rich in Miami (1958)	Richcraft (1959)

cover of augmented CD release
- Live in Miami with Flip Phillips

Professional ratings
Review scores
Source	Rating
Allmusic	4.5/5 stars

Buddy Rich in Miami is a 1958 Verve live album by Buddy Rich featuring Flip Phillips recorded at the Dream Bar of the Johnina Hotel in Miami Beach, Florida in 1957.

The album has been re-issued on CD alone and also, as Live in Miami with Flip Phillips, together with several additional tracks from a 1954 Rich/Phillips LA studio recording session with the Oscar Peterson Trio.

== Track listing ==
Buddy Rich in Miami

1. "Lover, Come Back to Me" (Oscar Hammerstein II, Sigmund Romberg)
2. "Topsy" (Edgar Battle, Eddie Durham)
3. "Undecided" (Leo Robin, Charlie Shavers)
4. "Broadway" (Billy Bird, Teddy McRae, Henri Woode)
5. "Jumpin' at the Woodside" (Basie) – 10:11

Live in Miami with Flip Phillips re-issue

1. "Lover, Come Back to Me"
2. "Topsy"
3. "Undecided"
4. "Broadway"
5. "Jumpin' at the Woodside
6. "Lemon Aid 21"
7. "I'll Never Be The Same"
8. "All of Me"
9. "I've Got the World on a String"
10. "Almost Like Being in Love"
11. "The Lady's in Love with You"
12. "Singing the Blues"
13. "Birth of the Blues"

== Personnel ==
Buddy Rich in Miami / Live in Miami... (tracks 1–5)

- Buddy Rich - drums
- Flip Phillips - tenor saxophone
- Ronnie Ball - piano
- Peter Ind - double bass

Live in Miami... (tracks 6–13)

- Buddy Rich - drums
- Flip Phillips - tenor saxophone
- Oscar Peterson - piano
- Ray Brown - bass
- Herb Ellis - guitar
