= The Great New Gene Krupa Quartet Featuring Charlie Ventura =

Studio album by Gene Krupa Quartet Featuring Charlie Ventura
- Released: 1964
- Recorded: January 29 and February 5, 1964; New York City
- Genre: Jazz
- Labels: Verve; V/V6 8584
- Producer: Creed Taylor

Louis Bellson chronology
The Mighty Two (1963)	The Great New Gene Krupa Quartet Featuring Charlie Ventura (1964)	Live at the New School (1973)

The Great New Gene Krupa Quartet Featuring Charlie Ventura is the final studio album by American jazz drummer Gene Krupa featuring performances recorded in 1964 for the Verve label.

== Reception ==
The Allmusic review awarded the album 3 stars stating "Drummer Gene Krupa's final recording as a leader reunited him with the bombastic tenor saxophonist Charlie Ventura... Ventura's extroverted playing (on tenor, alto and baritone) is not for everyone's taste but he is in generally good form, and even an aging Krupa still retains his youthful excitement and enthusiasm".

Professional ratings
Review scores
Source	Rating
Allmusic	3/5 stars

== Track listing ==
1. "Tickle-Toe" (Lester Young) - 3:08
2. "Come Back to Sorrento" (Ernesto De Curtis) - 2:30
3. "Undecided" (Sid Robin, Charlie Shavers) - 3:27
4. "Sophisticated Lady" (Duke Ellington, Irving Mills, Mitchell Parish) - 2:50
5. "Cry Me a River" (Arthur Hamilton) - 3:00
6. "Hello, Dolly" (Jerry Herman) - 1:50
7. "Stomping Waltz" (Gene, Krupa, Charlie Ventura) - 4:37
8. "I Love You" (Harlan Thompson, Harry Archer) - 2:30
9. "Take the "A" Train" (Billy Strayhorn) - 3:50
10. "Misty" (Erroll Garner) - 3:10
11. "I'm Getting Sentimental Over You" (George Bassman, Ned Washington) - 1:50
12. "Flying Home" (Benny Goodman, Lionel Hampton, Sid Robin) - 3:27
- Recorded in New York City on January 29 (tracks 1, 5, 8–10 & 12) and February 5 (tracks 2–4, 6, 7 & 11), 1964

== Personnel ==
- Gene Krupa – drums
- Charlie Ventura – alto saxophone, tenor saxophone, baritone saxophone
- John Bunch – piano
- Nabil (Knobby) Totah – bass
