= Buddy Rich Plays and Plays and Plays =

Studio album by Buddy Rich
- Released: 1977
- Recorded: February 1977
- Studio: RCA, New York City
- Genre: Jazz
- Length: 46:47
- Label: RCA
- Producer: Norman Schwartz

Buddy Rich chronology
Speak No Evil (1976)	Buddy Rich Plays and Plays and Plays (1977)	Lionel Hampton Presents Buddy Rich (1977)

Compilation / re-issue
- 2-fer re-issue of Plays and Plays and Plays with Speak No Evil

Professional ratings
Review scores
Source	Rating
Allmusic	4/5 stars

Buddy Rich Plays and Plays and Plays is a big band jazz album recorded by Buddy Rich and released by RCA Records in 1977. The album marked his last for the label. Plays and Plays and Plays was nominated for the Best Jazz Performance by a Big Band at the 20th Annual Grammy Awards in 1978, but lost to Prime Time by Count Basie.

== Track listing ==
LP side A:

1. "Ya Gotta Try" (Sammy Nestico) – 3:31
2. "Tales of Rhoda Rat" (Bob Mintzer) – 5:42
3. "'Round About Midnight" (Thelonious Monk, Cootie Williams, Bernie Hanighen) – 6:41 arr. Dick Lieb
4. "Time Out" (Don Menza) – 7:53

LP side B:

1. "No Jive" (Bob Mintzer) – 5:55
2. "Lush Life" (Billy Strayhorn) – 4:05
3. "Party Time" (Bob Mintzer) – 5:31
4. "Kong" (C. Brown, E. Korvin, M. Baier, R. Punch) – 4:57
5. "Mickey Mouse" (Jimmie Dodd) – 2:32

== Personnel ==
- Buddy Rich – drums
- Alan Gauvin – saxophone
- Dean Palanzo – saxophone
- Steve Marcus – tenor saxophone, soprano saxophone
- Bob Mintzer – tenor saxophone, flute
- Mauro Turso – saxophone
- David Stahl – trumpet
- Dean Pratt – trumpet
- John Marshall – trumpet
- Ross Konikoff – trumpet
- Clinton Sharman – trombone
- Rick Stepton – trombone
- Dave Boyle – bass trombone
- Joshua Rich – guitar
- Steve Khan – guitar on "Kong"
- Barry Kiener – keyboards
- Jon Burr – bass
- Will Lee – bass on "Kong"
- Errol "Crusher" Bennett – congas on "Kong"
- Gwen Guthrie – vocals (on "Kong")
- Josh Brown – vocals (on "Kong")
- Lani Groves – vocals (on "Kong")
- K. R. Grant – vocals (on "Mickey Mouse")
