= The Voice Is Rich =

Studio album by Buddy Rich
- Released: 1959
- Recorded: October 1959
- Genre: Jazz
- Length: 32:20
- Label: Mercury
- Producer: Jack Tracy

Buddy Rich chronology
Rich Versus Roach (1959)	The Voice Is Rich (1959)	The Driver (1960)

Professional ratings
Review scores
Source	Rating
Allmusic	3/5 stars

The Voice Is Rich is a 1959 Mercury Records recording by Buddy Rich as vocalist backed by the Hal Mooney Orchestra. The album has also been reissued on CD together (as a "two-fer") with Buddy Rich Just Sings.

== Track listing ==
LP Side A

1. "Down the Old Ox Road" – 2:21
2. "Born to Be Blue" – 3:56
3. "I've Heard That Song Before" – 2:45
4. "I Want a Little Girl" – 2:36
5. "I Can't Give You Anything But Love" – 3:02

LP Side B

1. "You've Changed" – 2:39
2. "Me And My Shadow" – 2:28
3. "(Ah, the Apple Trees) When the World Was Young" – 3:57
4. "It's Been a Long, Long Time" – 2:56
5. "I Don't Want To Walk Without You" – 2:55
6. "Back In Your Own Back Yard" – 2:45

== Personnel ==
- Buddy Rich – vocals
- Hal Mooney Orchestra
