= The Driver (Buddy Rich album) =

Studio album by Buddy Rich
- Released: April 4, 1960
- Recorded: 1960
- Genre: Vocal jazz
- Length: 48:39
- Label: EmArcy
- Producer: Jack Tracy

Buddy Rich chronology
The Voice Is Rich (1959)	The Driver (1960)	Playtime (1961)

Professional ratings
Review scores
Source	Rating
Allmusic	4/5 stars

The Driver is a 1960 studio album by Buddy Rich.

== Track listing ==
LP side A

1. "Brainwashed" (Buddy Rich, Ernie Wilkins) – 5:00
2. "A Swinging Serenade" (Wilkins) – 4:05
3. "Big Leg Mary" (Rich, Wilkins) – 5:45
4. "Straight, No Chaser" (Thelonious Monk) – 4:20

LP side B

1. "Bloody Mary" (Wilkins) – 6:30
2. "A Night in Tunisia" (Dizzy Gillespie, Frank Paparelli) – 6:05
3. "Miss Bessie's Cookin'" (Wilkins) – 5:15

== Personnel ==
- Seldon Powell — tenor saxophone
- Buddy Rich — vocals, drums
- Willie Dennis — trombone
- Irwin "Marky" Markowitz — trumpet
- Dave McKenna — piano
- Earl May - double bass
- Mike Mainieri — vibraphone
- Ernie Wilkins — arranger
