= Lester Young Trio =

The Lester Young Trio

Studio album by Lester Young
- Released: 1951
- Recorded: March–April 1946
- Studio: Radio Recorders, Hollywood, California
- Genre: Jazz
- Label: Mercury (Verve CD re-issue in 1994)
- Producer: Norman Granz

Lester Young chronology
Lester Swings (1945)	The Lester Young Trio (1951)	Carnegie Blues (1955)

The Lester Young Trio No. 2
- 1953 Clef Records release

CD combination / re-issue cover
- 1994 Verve CD re-issue

Professional ratings
Review scores
Source	Rating
AllMusic	3/5 stars

The Lester Young Trio and The Lester Young Trio No. 2 are jazz trio albums by Lester Young with Nat King Cole and Buddy Rich, recorded in Hollywood, California, in March–April 1946, with the first four tracks being released in 1951.

== Release history ==
The recordings were produced by Norman Granz and the first four tracks were released in 1951 on a Mercury Records 10 inch LP, The Lester Young Trio. Another four tracks were released in 1953 on Norman Granz' Clef Records label as The Lester Young Trio No. 2. All eight trio tracks were combined on a 12-inch Norgran LP, The Lester Young Buddy Rich Trio released in 1955. Nat King Cole was under contract with a different record label at the time so was credited only as "Aye Guy" on the original Mercury / Clef / Norgran releases.

In 1994 Verve Records released a CD version of The Lester Young Trio that combined all eight tracks from the 1946 Hollywood trio recordings, plus an alternate take of "I Cover the Waterfront" and an additional shortened version of "Back to the Land", together with four additional tracks recorded earlier by a quintet with Nat King Cole (but without Lester Young or Buddy Rich).

== Track listing ==
=== The Lester Young Trio ===
LP side A

1. "I Cover the Waterfront" (Green, Heyman) – 4:05
2. "Somebody Loves Me" (MacDonald, DeSylva, Gershwin) – 3:54

LP side B

1. "I've Found a New Baby" (Palmer, Williams) – 4:07
2. "Back to the Land" (Young) – 4:05

=== The Lester Young Trio No. 2 ===
LP side A

1. "I Want to Be Happy" (Caesar, Youmans) – 3:58
2. "Peg O' My Heart" (Bryan, Fisher) – 4:06

LP side B

1. "Mean To Me" (Ahlert, Turk) – 4:15
2. "The Man I Love" (Gershwin, Gershwin) – 3:58

=== Bonus tracks on Verve 1994 CD re-issue ===
Two tracks from the original 1946 Young-Cole-Rich trio recording sessions:

- "I Cover the Waterfront" (alternate take) – 3:56
- "Back to the Land" (edited version) – 3:54

Four tracks from earlier Nat King Cole sessions (without Young or Rich):

- "I've Found a New Baby" (Palmer, Williams) – 4:40
- "Rosetta" – 5:09
- "Sweet Lorraine" (Burwell, Parish) – 4:55
- "Blowed and Gone" – 4:41

== Personnel ==
- Lester Young – tenor saxophone
- Buddy Rich – drums
- Nat King Cole (credited as "Aye Guy" on the original releases) – piano

Personnel on 4 of the CD re-issue bonus tracks

- Nat "King" Cole – piano
- Harry "Sweets" Edison – trumpet
- Dexter Gordon – tenor saxophone
- Clifford Owens – drums
- Red Callender or Johnny Miller – bass

== References / notes ==
- Verve Records Discography: 1944-1946 at jazzdisco.org
- The Lester Young Trio (Mercury LP) at microgroove.jp

== Sources ==
Gridley, Mark C. Jazz Styles: History & Analysis. 9th edn. N.J.: Prentice Hall, 2006. Print.
