= The New One! =

Studio album by Buddy Rich
- Released: May 1968
- Recorded: June 15–November 30, 1967
- Genre: Jazz
- Length: 46:41
- Label: Pacific Jazz
- Producer: Richard Bock

Buddy Rich chronology
Big Swing Face (1967)	The New One! (1968)	Rich à la Rakha (1968)

Alternative cover / title
- Liberty Records, Take It Away!

Professional ratings
Review scores
Source	Rating
Allmusic	4/5 stars
The Penguin Guide to Jazz Recordings	3.5/4 stars

The New One! also released as Take it Away! is a 1968 studio recording by the Buddy Rich Big Band.

== Track listing ==
LP side A

1. "Away We Go" (Ferguson) – 3:11
2. "Machine" (Reddie) – 3:38
3. "The Rotten Kid" (Greco) – 5:11
4. "New Blues" (Piestrup) – 4:54
5. "Something for Willie" (Boice) – 4:08
6. "Standing up in a Hammock" (Potts) – 2:40

LP side B

1. "Chicago" (Fred Fisher) – 2:08
2. "Luv" (Mulligan) – 2:56
3. "I Can't Get Started" (Vernon Duke, Ira Gershwin) – 3:50
4. "Group Shot" (Piestrup) – 5:07
5. "Diabolus" (Ferguson) – 8:58

bonus tracks on CD re-issue:

12. "Away We Go" (alt. take) – 3:00
13. "The Rotten Kid" (alt. take) – 4:14
14. "Diabolus" (alt. take) – 8:58
15. "Old Timey" (Florence) – 3:15
16. "Naptown Blues" (Montgomery) – 4:25

== Personnel ==
- Ernie Watts – alto saxophone
- Charles Owens – alto saxophone (tracks A1, A3, B5)
- James Mosher – alto saxophone (tracks A2, A4-B4)
- Jay Corre – tenor saxophone
- Pascel LaBarbera – tenor saxophone (tracks A1, A3, B5)
- Robert Keller – tenor saxophone (tracks A2, A4-B4)
- Frank Capi – baritone saxophone (tracks A1, A3, B5)
- Meyer Hirsch – baritone saxophone (tracks A2, A4-B4)
- Chuck Findley – trumpet
- John Sotille – trumpet
- Yoshito Murakami – trumpet
- Russell Iverson – trumpet (tracks A1, A3, B5)
- Ollie Mitchell – trumpet (tracks A2, A4-B4)
- Robert Brawn – trombone
- John Boice – trombone (tracks A2, A4-B4)
- Sam Burtis – trombone (tracks A1, A3, B5)
- Jack Spurlock – trombone (tracks A1, A3, B5)
- James Trimble – trombone (tracks A2, A4-B4)
- Ray Starling – piano (tracks A2, A4-B4)
- Russel Turner, Jr. – piano (tracks A1, A3, B5)
- Richie Resnicoff – guitar
- James Gannon – bass
- Ronald Fudoli – bass (tracks A1, A3, B5)
- Buddy Rich – drums
