= Blues Caravan =

Studio album by Buddy Rich
- Released: February 1962
- Recorded: August 14–16, 1961
- Genre: Jazz
- Length: 48:39
- Label: Verve
- Producer: Creed Taylor

Buddy Rich chronology
| Playtime (1961) | Blues Caravan (1962) | Burnin' Beat (1962) |

Professional ratings
Review scores
| Source | Rating |
|---|---|
| Allmusic | 3.5/5 stars |
| The Penguin Guide to Jazz Recordings | 3/4 stars |

Blues Caravan is a 1962 studio album by Buddy Rich and a sextet. Rich later took this sextet on a United States Department of State tour of the Far East and Asia.

== Track listing ==
LP side A

1. "Blowin' the Blues Away" (Horace Silver) – 8:40
2. "B.R. Blues" (Buddy Rich) – 3:14
3. "Late Date" (Maynard Ferguson) – 5:12

LP side B

1. "Caravan" (Duke Ellington, Irving Mills, Juan Tizol) – 9:44
2. "Young Blood" (Mike Mainieri) – 5:59
3. "I Remember Clifford" (Benny Golson) – 3:35

== Personnel ==
- Wyatt Ruther - double bass
- Buddy Rich - drums
- Sam Most - flute
- Johnny Morris - piano
- Rolf Ericson - trumpet
- Mike Mainieri - vibraphone

Production

- Creed Taylor - audio production
- Roy de Carava - cover photo
- Dick Olmstead - engineer
- Ken Druker - executive producer
- Dom Cerulli - liner notes
- Hollis King - reissue art director
- Sherniece Smith
- Kip Smith - reissue mastering
- Bryan Koniarz - reissue producer
