= The Mighty Two (Louis Bellson and Gene Krupa album) =

Studio album by Gene Krupa and Louis Bellson
- Released: 1963 (Re-released 1972)
- Recorded: May 1963; New York City
- Genre: Jazz
- Length: 28:09
- Label: Roulette; R/SR 52098
- Producer: Teddy Reig

Gene Krupa chronology
Burnin' Beat (1962)	The Mighty Two (1963)	The Great New Gene Krupa Quartet Featuring Charlie Ventura (1964)

Louis Bellson chronology
Happy Sounds (1962)	The Mighty Two (1963)	Explorations (1964)

The Mighty Two is an album by American drummers Louis Bellson and Gene Krupa recorded in 1963 and released on the Roulette label. The album was conceived as a drum instruction disc demonstrating rudimental drum techniques with Bellson and Krupa fronting an eight piece band along with two solo performances by the two co-leaders.

== Reception ==
Professional ratings
Review scores
Source	Rating
AllMusic	3/5 stars

AllMusic awarded the album 3 stars.

== Track listing ==
All compositions by Fred Thompson

1. "The Mighty Two" - 2:26
2. "The Three Drags" - 2:07
3. "Paradiddle Song" - 2:10
4. "Accent on Flamboyance" - 2:20
5. "Rolls ala Bossa Nova" - 2:23
6. "The Mighty Two Alone Together" - 2:30
7. "Rolls ala Bossa Nova #2" - 2:23
8. "More Flams" - 2:18
9. "Swingin' the Rudiments" - 2:25
10. "Que Sticks" - 2:18
11. "Two in One" - 2:38
12. "Rythmic Excursion" - 2:16

== Personnel ==
- Louis Bellson, Gene Krupa - drums
- Joe Newman, Joe Wilder - trumpet (tracks 1–5 & 7–10)
- Tyree Glenn - trombone (tracks 1–5 & 7–10)
- Phil Woods - alto saxophone (tracks 1–5 & 7–10)
- Dick Hyman - piano (tracks 1–5 & 7–10)
- Mary Osborne - guitar (tracks 1–5 & 7–10)
- Milt Hinton - bass (tracks 1–5 & 7–10)
- Fred Thompson - arranger
