= Playtime (album) =

Studio album by Buddy Rich
- Released: 1961
- Recorded: October 3–4, 1960
- Genre: Jazz
- Length: 48:39
- Label: Argo; LP-676
- Producer: Jack Tracy

Buddy Rich chronology
The Driver (1960)	Playtime (1961)	Blues Caravan (1961)

Professional ratings
Review scores
Source	Rating
Allmusic	3/5 stars
DownBeat	4/5 stars

Playtime is a 1961 studio album by Buddy Rich.

== Track listing ==
LP side A

1. "Lulu's Back in Town" (Al Dubin, Harry Warren) – 5:53
2. "Playtime" (Sam Most) – 6:14
3. "Will You Still Be Mine?" (Tom Adair, Matt Dennis) – 4:45
4. "Fascinating Rhythm" (George Gershwin, Ira Gershwin) – 4:39

LP side B

1. "Makin' Whoopee" (Walter Donaldson, Gus Kahn) – 4:26
2. "Marbles" (Johnny Morris, Most) – 5:51
3. "Misty" (Johnny Burke, Erroll Garner) – 5:10
4. "Cheek to Cheek" (Irving Berlin) – 6:15

== Personnel ==
- Buddy Rich — drums
- Sam Most — flute
- Don Goldie — trumpet
- Wilbur Wynne — guitar
- Johnny Morris — piano
- Mike Mainieri — vibraphone
