= Mercy, Mercy (album) =

Live album by Buddy Rich
- Released: 1968
- Recorded: July 7, 1968
- Venue: Caesars Palace, Las Vegas Boulevard
- Genre: Jazz
- Length: 45:28
- Label: Pacific Jazz
- Producer: Richard Bock

Buddy Rich chronology
Rich à la Rakha (1968)	Mercy, Mercy (1968)	Buddy & Soul (1969)

Professional ratings
Review scores
Source	Rating
Allmusic	4.5/5 stars
The Penguin Guide to Jazz Recordings	3.5/4 stars
Record Mirror	4/5 stars

Mercy, Mercy is a 1968 live album by the Buddy Rich Big Band, recorded at Caesars Palace.

== Track listing ==
LP side A

1. "Mercy, Mercy, Mercy" (Joe Zawinul) – 5:34
2. "Preach and Teach" (Johnny Burch) – 4:06
3. "Channel One Suite" (Bill Reddie) – 12:50

LP side B

1. "Big Mama Cass" (Don Sebesky) – 3:22
2. "Goodbye Yesterday" (Don Piestrup) – 6:18
3. "Acid Truth" (Don Menza) – 5:50
4. "Alfie" (Burt Bacharach, Hal David) – 3:49
5. "Ode to Billie Joe" (Bobbie Gentry) – 3:39

Bonus tracks added to 1997 Blue Note CD reissue

9. "Chavala" (Jerry Bock, Sheldon Harnick) – 5:20
10. "Mr. Lucky" (Jerry Livingston, Henry Mancini) – 5:47
11. "Chelsea Bridge" (Billy Strayhorn) – 5:09

== Personnel ==
The Buddy Rich big band

- Buddy Rich - drums
- Walter Namuth - guitar
- Gary Walters - double bass, electric bass
- Joe Azarello - piano
- Charles Owens - alto saxophone
- Art Pepper - alto saxophone
- Pat LaBarbera - tenor saxophone
- Don Menza - tenor saxophone
- John Laws - baritone saxophone
- Jim Trimble - trombone
- Rick Stepton - trombone
- Peter Graves - bass trombone
- Al Porcino - trumpet
- David Culp - trumpet
- Kenneth Faulk - trumpet
- Bill Prince - trumpet

Arrangers:

- Don Menza
- Allyn Ferguson
- Charles Owens
- Don Piestrup
- Bill Reddie
- Don Sebesky
- Phil Wilson

Production

- Bob Belden - producer
- Richard Bock - producer
- Dean Pratt - producer
- Bill Porter – engineer
- Gabor Halmos - cover design
- David Redfern - photography
- Ron Waller - photography
- Peter Whorf - photography
