= Live at Ronnie Scott's (Wes Montgomery album) =

Live album by Wes Montgomery
- Released: 1996
- Recorded: April and May 1965 at Ronnie Scott's Jazz Club, London
- Genre: Jazz
- Label: RSJH Music

Body and Soul (Live at Ronnie Scott's Club) is an album by American jazz guitarist Wes Montgomery. The album was recorded while Montgomery was on tour in 1965, and it was first released in 1996.

== Reception ==
Professional ratings
Review scores
Source	Rating
Allmusic	4/5 stars
The Penguin Guide to Jazz Recordings	3/4 stars

In his review for Allmusic, critic Alex Henderson wrote: "... the distinctive guitarist was still quite capable of embracing standard hard bop, which is exactly what he does on Live at Ronnie Scott's... There are no hints of pop-jazz or NAC music on this disc. Montgomery is in fine form on "Wes' Easy Blues" as well as performances of standards like "I'll Remember April" and "Body and Soul." Although not quite essential, Live at Ronnie Scott's is a CD that lovers of Montgomery's straight-ahead playing will appreciate."

== Track listing ==
1. "Sonny Boy" (Ray Henderson, Bud De Sylva, Lew Brown) – 8:25
2. "Wes' Easy Blues" (Wes Montgomery) – 7:27
3. "Solo Ballad in a Major" (Montgomery) – 4:05
4. "Gone With the Wind" (Herbert Magidson, Allie Wrubel) – 12:18
5. "Broadway" (Ray Henderson) – 12:41
6. "Body and Soul" (Edward Heyman, Robert Sour, Frank Eyton, Johnny Green) – 10:22
7. "I'll Remember April" (Gene de Paul, Patricia Johnston, Don Raye) – 10:53
8. "Words from Wes" – 2:31

== Personnel ==
- Wes Montgomery – guitar
- Stan Tracey – piano
- Rick Laird – bass
- Ronnie Stephenson – drums
