= Live at Ronnie Scott's (Buddy Rich album) =

Live album by Buddy Rich
- Released: 1980
- Recorded: March 21–22, 1980
- Venue: Ronnie Scott's Jazz Club, London
- Genre: Jazz
- Label: DRG Records
- Producer: Jimmy Parsons

Buddy Rich chronology
Together Again: For the First Time (1978)	Live at Ronnie Scott's (1980)	Buddy Rich Band (1981)

Alternative cover / title
- The Man from Planet Jazz

Professional ratings
Review scores
Source	Rating
Allmusic	3.5/5 stars

Buddy Rich, Live at Ronnie Scott's, also released as The Man From Planet Jazz, is a 1980 jazz big band recording made by Buddy Rich at Ronnie Scott's Jazz Club in London. It is not to be confused with the earlier 1971 RCA double LP, Very Alive at Ronnie Scotts.

== Track listing ==
LP side 1:

1. Intro / "Beulah Witch" (Don Menza) – 4:37
2. "Grand Concourse" (Bob Kaye) – 6:47
3. "Blues a la 88" (Bob Mintzer) – 6:23
4. "Saturday Night" (Mintzer) – 5:23

LP side 2:

1. "Slow Funk" (Mintzer) – 5:44
2. "Good News" (Mintzer) – 15:31

== Personnel ==
- Buddy Rich – drums. leader
- Wayne Pedziwiatr – bass
- Ernest Vantrease – piano
- Jack Leibowitz – alto saxophone
- Andy Fusco – alto saxophone
- Kenneth Hitchcock – tenor saxophone
- Steve Marcus – tenor saxophone, soprano saxophone
- Bob Mintzer – baritone saxophone
- Bob Coassin – trumpet
- Mike Plumleigh – trumpet
- Simo Salimen – trumpet
- Bob Doll – trumpet
- Glenn Franke – trombone
- Roger Homefield – trombone
- Pete Beltran – bass trombone
