= Rich in London =

Live album by Buddy Rich
- Released: 1972
- Recorded: December 6–8, 1971
- Genre: Jazz
- Length: 48:39
- Label: RCA Victor
- Producer: Richard Block

Buddy Rich chronology
Conversations (1972)	Rich in London (1972)	Stick It (1972)

alternate (extended) release
- 2 LP UK release

Professional ratings
Review scores
Source	Rating
Allmusic	4.5/5 stars

Rich in London a.k.a. Very Alive at Ronnie Scotts is a live album by Buddy Rich and his big band, recorded in 1971 at Ronnie Scott's Jazz Club in London. Not to be confused with the 1980 DRG Buddy Rich Big Band recording, Live at Ronnie Scott's.

== Release history ==
The US LP release, Rich in London, contains 8 tracks plus a Rich monologue. The UK release, Very Alive at Ronnie Scotts, is a double LP containing an additional 5 tracks plus more examples of Rich talking to the audience. Both albums have been re-issued on CD. The Mosaic Records single CD re-issue of Rich in London includes 4 additional bonus tracks (4 of the "missing" 5 tracks from the UK "Very Alive..." release - all but "Superstar" - but not the additional Rich monologue).

== Track listing ==
=== Rich in London ===
LP Side 1

1. "Dancing Men" (Pat LaBarbera) – 6:41
2. "The Word" (Don Piestrup) – 6:03
3. "St. Marks Square (A Special Day)" (LaBarbera) – 4:06
4. "That's Enough" (Jon Hendricks) – 3:23
5. "Little Train" (Herbie Phillips) – 6:26

LP Side 2

1. "Two Bass Hit" (Dizzy Gillespie, John Lewis) – 4:00
2. "Theme from Love Story" (Francis Lai) – 5:50
3. "Time Being" (Bill Holman) – 12:37
4. Buddy Rich Speaks – 4:45

=== Very Alive at Ronnie Scotts ===
Disc 1

1. "Moment's Notice" (John Coltrane) – 3:25
2. "Watson's Walk" (LaBarbera) – 7:28
3. "St. Marks Square (A Special Day)"
4. "Little Train"
5. "Milestones" (Miles Davis) – 5:26
6. "The Words"
7. "Dancing Men"
8. Just Buddy Rich – 5:02

Disc 2

1. "Superstar" (Andrew Lloyd Webber, Tim Rice) – 3:50
2. "Love Story"
3. "In a Mellow Tone" (Duke Ellington) – 5:48
4. "Two Bass Hit"
5. Buddy Rich Introduces – 1:21
6. "That's Enough"
7. "Time Being"
8. Buddy Rich Again – 4:47

== Personnel ==
- Brian A. Grivna – alto sax, flute
- Jimmy Mosher – alto sax, soprano sax, flute
- Pat LaBarbera – tenor sax, soprano sax, flute
- Don Englert – tenor sax, soprano sax, flute
- Joe Calo – baritone sax, soprano sax, flute
- Lin Biviano – trumpet
- Jeff Stout – trumpet
- Wayne Naus – trumpet
- John DeFlon – trumpet
- Bruce Paulson – trombone
- Tony DiMaggio – trombone
- John Leys – bass trombone
- Bob Dogan – piano
- Paul Kondziela – bass
- Buddy Rich – drums
