= Buddy Rich =

American jazz drummer and bandleader (1917–1987)

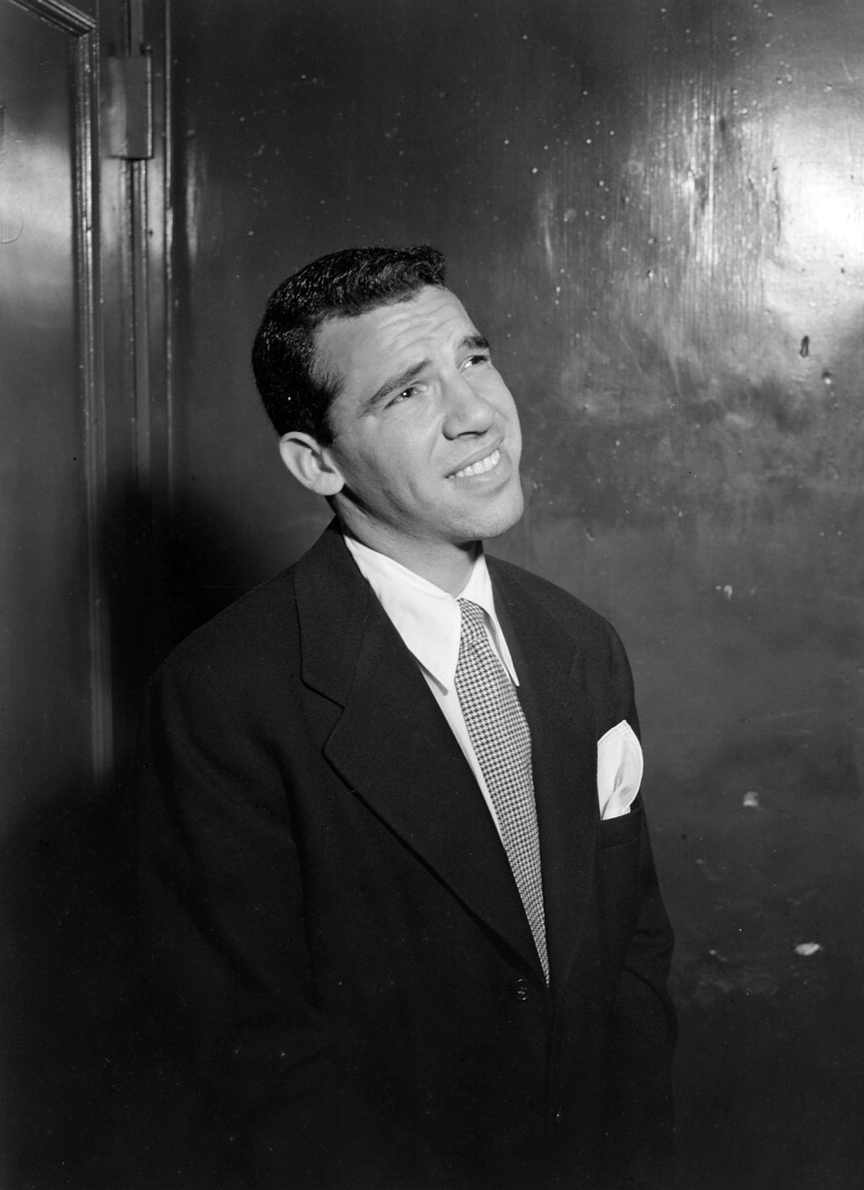
- Rich at the Arcadia Ballroom in 1947

Background information
- Also known as: Traps; The Drum Wonder; Mr. Drums
- Born: Bernard Rich; September 30, 1917; Brooklyn, New York City, U.S.
- Died: April 2, 1987 (aged 69) Los Angeles, California, U.S.
- Genres: Jazz; big band; swing
- Occupations: Musician; songwriter; conductor; bandleader; singer
- Instruments: Drums; vocals
- Years active: 1921–1987
- Labels: Clef; Norgran; Verve; RCA; Pacific Jazz; Liberty; Blue Note; Groove Merchant; EmArcy; Mercury; MCA; Argo
- Formerly of: The Buddy Rich Big Band; Joe Marsala; Bunny Berigan; Artie Shaw; The Vic Schoen Orchestra; Tommy Dorsey; Benny Carter; Harry James; Les Brown; Charlie Ventura; Jazz at the Philharmonic

Bernard "Buddy" Rich (September 30, 1917 – April 2, 1987) was an American jazz drummer, songwriter, conductor, and bandleader. He is considered one of the most influential drummers of all time.

Rich was born and raised in Brooklyn, New York, United States. He discovered his affinity for jazz music at a young age and began drumming at the age of two. He began playing jazz in 1937, working with acts such as Bunny Berigan, Artie Shaw, Tommy Dorsey, Count Basie, and Harry James. From 1942 to 1944, Rich served in the U.S. Marines. From 1945 to 1948, he led the Buddy Rich Orchestra. In 1966, he recorded a big-band style arrangement of songs from West Side Story. He found lasting success in 1966 with the formation of the Buddy Rich Big Band, also billed as The Buddy Rich Band and The Big Band Machine.

Rich was known for his virtuoso technique, power, and speed. He was an advocate of the traditional grip, though he occasionally used matched grip when playing the toms. Despite his commercial success and musical talent, Rich never learned how to read sheet music, preferring to listen to the drum parts played in rehearsal by his drum roadie and rely on his memory.

== Early life and career ==
Rich was born in Sheepshead Bay, Brooklyn, New York, to Jewish parents Bess Skolnik and Robert Rich who were both American vaudevillians.

At 18 months old, he became part of his parents' vaudeville act, dressed in a sailor suit playing an arrangement of "The Stars and Stripes Forever" behind a large bass and snare drum – an act which concluded with him emerging from behind the drums tap-dancing to thunderous applause. By the age of four, he was headlining Broadway, billed as "Baby Traps the Drum Wonder". In his teens, he led a band and toured in the U.S. and Australia. By the age of 15, he was earning a weekly salary of $1,000 and was the second-highest-paid child entertainer during the 1930s, behind actor Jackie Coogan. Rich would sneak into jazz clubs at an age when he looked old enough to sit on the drum set, and fell in love with jazz.

== Career ==
=== Jazz career ===
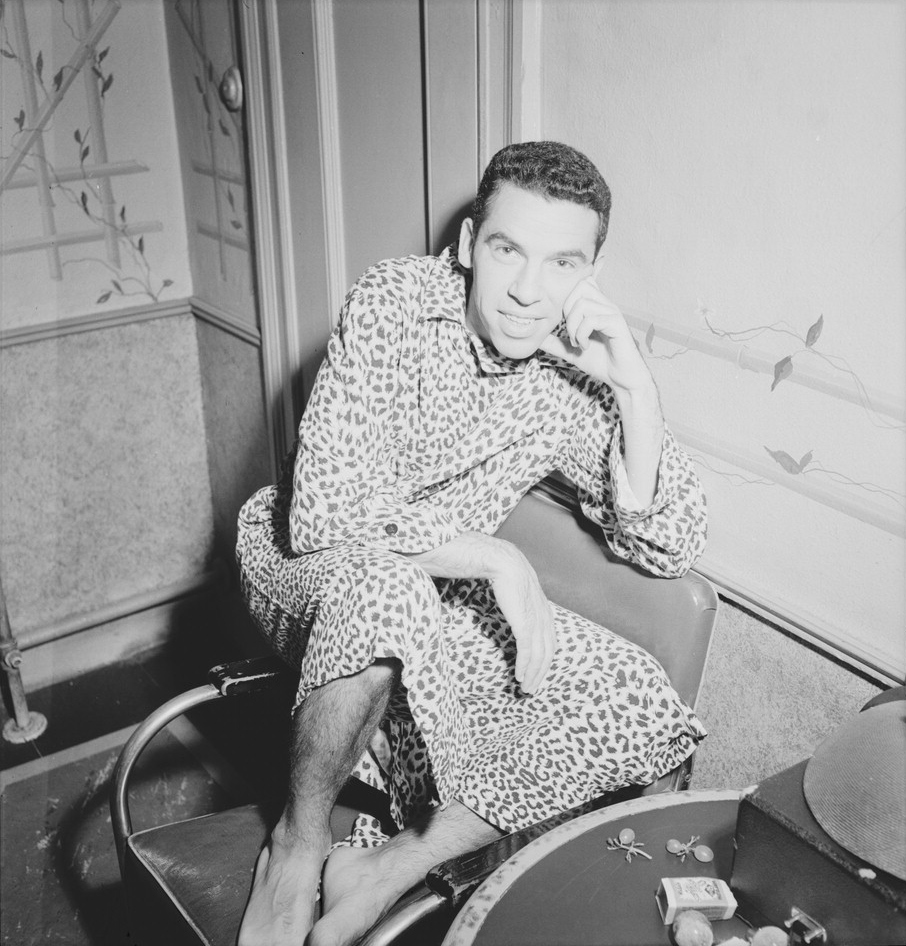
Buddy Rich in New York City in August 1946

His jazz career began in 1937 with clarinetist Joe Marsala. He became a member of the big bands led by Bunny Berigan and Artie Shaw. Rich considered himself a featured performer and disliked bandleaders. He claimed that the musicians "hardly look at the bandleader", and that the drummer is the real "quarterback" of the band. For Shaw's part, he felt that Rich did not follow direction and finally asked the drummer, "Who are you playing for? Me, yourself, who?" Rich admitted that he played for himself and his audience, whereupon Shaw suggested that Rich should accept the offer he had received from Tommy Dorsey: "I think you'd be happier there." Rich took Shaw's advice as a dismissal.

When Rich was home from touring with Shaw, he gave drum lessons to a 14-year-old Mel Brooks for six months. At 21, he participated in his first major recording with the Vic Schoen Orchestra who backed the Andrews Sisters.

In 1939, Rich joined the Dorsey band, leaving in 1942 to join the United States Marine Corps, in which he served as a Judo instructor and never saw combat. He was discharged in 1944 for medical reasons. After leaving the Marines, he returned to the Dorsey band. In 1946, with financial support from Frank Sinatra, he formed a band and continued to lead bands intermittently until the early 1950s.

Following the war, Rich formed his own big band, which often played at the Apollo Theater and featured backing vocals from Frank Sinatra.

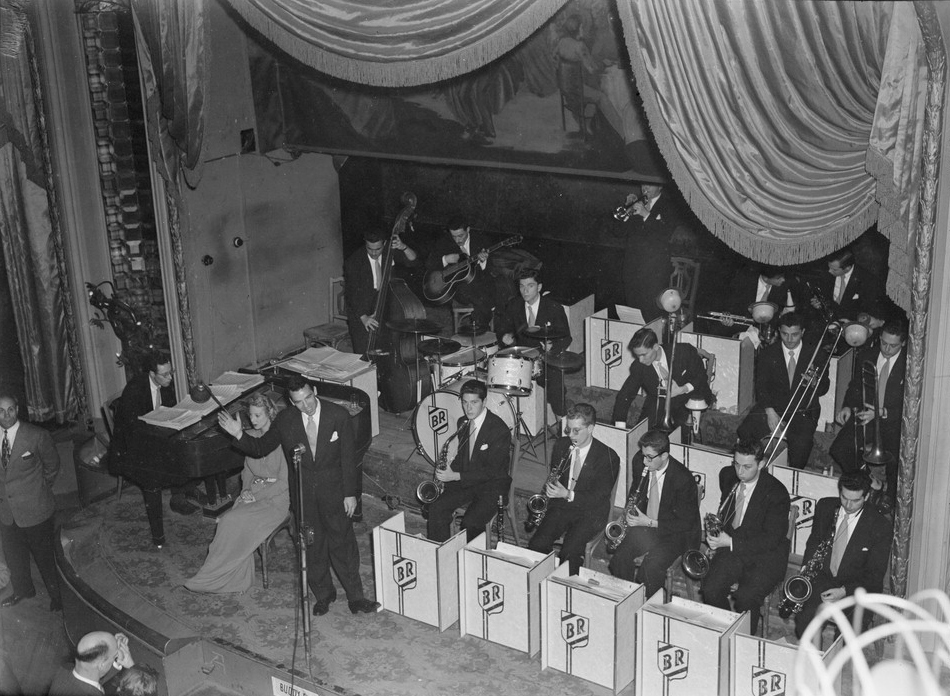
The Buddy Rich Big Band in the 1940s

In addition to playing with Tommy Dorsey (1939–1942, 1945, 1954–1955), Rich played with Benny Carter (1942), Harry James (1953–1962, 1964, 1965), Les Brown, Charlie Ventura, Jazz at the Philharmonic, and Charlie Parker (Bird and Diz, 1950).

In 1956, Gene Krupa and Buddy Rich recorded the collaboration album titled Krupa and Rich, which featured the song "Bernie's Tune", in which they traded drum solos for a total of six minutes.

In 1959, Buddy Rich and Max Roach recorded Rich versus Roach with their respective bands of the time.

From 1966 until his death, he led successful big bands in an era when their popularity had waned. He continued to play clubs but stated in interviews that the majority of his band's performances were at high schools, colleges, and universities rather than clubs. He was a session drummer for many recordings, where his playing was often less prominent than in his big-band performances. Especially notable were sessions for Ella Fitzgerald and Louis Armstrong, and the Oscar Peterson trio with bassist Ray Brown and guitarist Herb Ellis. In 1968, Rich collaborated with the Indian tabla player Ustad Alla Rakha on the album Rich à la Rakha.

He performed a big-band arrangement of a medley from West Side Story that was released on the 1966 album Swingin' New Big Band. The "West Side Story Medley", arranged by Bill Reddie, highlighted Rich's ability to blend his drumming into the band. Rich received the West Side Story arrangement of Leonard Bernstein's melodies from the musical in the mid-1960s; he found the music quite challenging and it took him almost a month of constant rehearsal to perfect. It later became a staple of his live performances. A six-minute performance of "Prologue/Jet Song" from the suite, performed during Frank Sinatra's portion of the Concert for the Americas on August 20, 1982, is on the DVD "Frank Sinatra: Concert for the Americas". In 2002, a DVD was released called The Lost West Side Story Tapes that captured a 1985 performance of this along with other numbers.

A live recording of the "Channel One Suite" is on the album Mercy, Mercy recorded at Caesars Palace in 1968. The album was acclaimed as the "finest all-round recording by Buddy Rich's big band".

=== TV appearances ===
In the 1950s, Rich was a frequent guest on The Steve Allen Show and other television variety shows, most notably on The Tonight Show Starring Johnny Carson. Rich and Carson were lifelong friends, and Carson was himself a drum enthusiast.

In 1973, PBS broadcast and syndicated Rich's February 6, 1973, performance at the Top of the Plaza in Rochester, New York. It was the first time thousands of drummers were exposed to Buddy in a full-length concert setting, and many drummers continue to name this program as a prime influence on their own playing. One of his most widely seen television performances was in a 1981 episode of The Muppet Show in which he engaged Muppet drummer Animal (performed by Frank Oz, drums played by Ronnie Verrell) in a drum battle. Rich's famous televised drum battles also included Gene Krupa, Ed Shaughnessy and Louie Bellson. Perhaps his most viewed television appearance was on Here's Lucy in the 1970 episode "Lucy And The Drum Contest".

=== Influences, technique, and performances ===
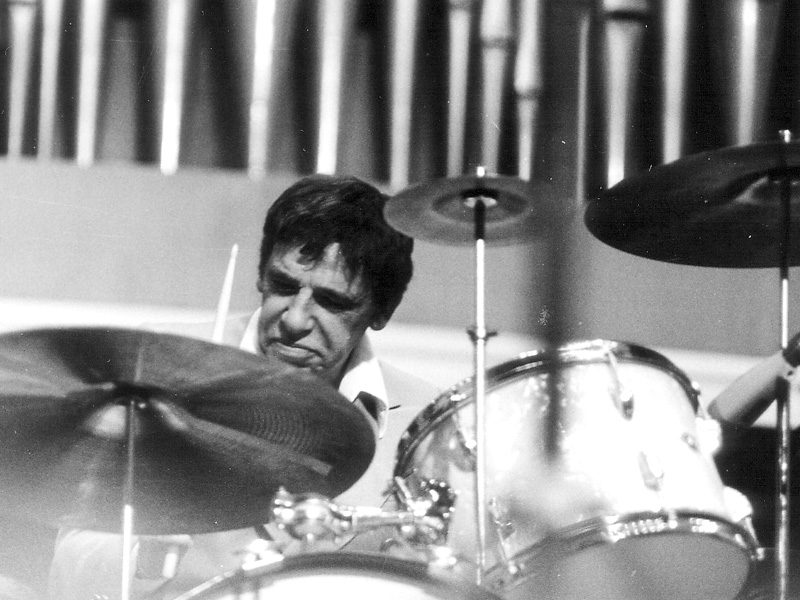
Buddy Rich performing at a concert in Cologne, Germany, on March 3, 1977

Rich cited Gene Krupa, Jo Jones, Chick Webb, Ray McKinley, Ray Bauduc, and Sid Catlett as influences.

He usually held his sticks with the traditional grip. He used the matched grip when playing floor toms around the drum set while performing cross-stickings (crossing arm over arm), which was one of his party tricks, often leading to loud cheers from the audience. Another technique he used to impress was the stick-trick, a fast roll performed by slapping two drumsticks together in a circular motion using "taps" or single-stroke stickings. He often used contrasting techniques to keep long drum solos from getting mundane. Aside from his energetic, explosive displays, he would go into quieter passages.

One passage he would use in most solos started with a simple single-stroke roll on the snare drum picking up speed and power, then slowly moving his sticks closer to the rim as he got quieter, and eventually playing on the rim itself while still maintaining speed. Then he would reverse the effect and slowly move towards the center of the snare while increasing power. Though well known as a powerful drummer, he did use brushes. On the album The Lionel Hampton Art Tatum Buddy Rich Trio (1955) he played with brushes almost exclusively.

In 1942, Rich and Henry Adler wrote Buddy Rich's Modern Interpretation of Snare Drum Rudiments, which is regarded as one of the more popular snare drum rudiment books. Adler met Rich through a former student. Adler said, "The kid told me he played better than Krupa. Buddy was only in his teens at the time and his friend was my first pupil. Buddy played and I watched his hands. Well, he knocked me right out. He did everything I wanted to do, and he did it with such ease. When I met his folks, I asked them who his teacher was. 'He never studied', they told me. That made me feel very good. I realized that it was something physical, not only mental, that you had to have."

Adler denied the rumor that he taught Rich how to play. "Sure, he studied with me, but he didn't come to me to learn how to hold the drumsticks. I set out to teach Buddy to read. He'd take six lessons, go on the road for six weeks and come back. He didn't practice. He couldn't, because wherever the guy went, he was followed around by admiring drummers. He didn't have time to practice. ...Tommy Dorsey wanted Buddy to write a book and he told him to get in touch with me. I did the book and Tommy wrote the foreword. Technically, I was Buddy's teacher, but I came along after he had already acquired his technique."

When asked if Rich could read music, Bobby Shew, lead trumpeter in Rich's mid-1960s big band replied, "No. He'd always have a drummer there during rehearsals to read and play the parts initially on new arrangements. Buddy would just sit in the empty audience seats in the afternoon and listen to the band. ... He'd only have to listen to a chart once and he'd have it memorized. We'd run through it and he'd know exactly how it went, how many measures it ran and what he'd have to do to drive it."

In a Modern Drummer interview, Rich had this to say about practicing: "I don't put much emphasis on practice anyhow. I think it's a fallacy to believe that the more you practice, the better you become. You can only get better by playing. You can sit in a basement with a set of drums and practice rudiments all day long, but if you don't play with a band, you won't learn style, technique, and taste, and you won't learn how to play for a band and with a band. It's like getting a job, any kind of job, it's an opportunity to develop. And practice, besides that, is boring. I know teachers who tell their students to practice three, four, six hours a day. If you can't get what you want after an hour of practice, you're not going to get it in four days."

In the same article, Rich also discourages playing drums with one's bare hands. When asked if he could do such a thing, he replied, "Yes, but why destroy your hands? I could think of a hundred ways to use my hands rather than to break them on the rim of a drum."

== Personal life ==
Rich was married to Marie Allison, a dancer and showgirl, on April 24, 1953, until his death in 1987. They had a daughter in 1954, Cathy, who later became a vocalist and carried on her father's band. Rich was also cousin of actor Jonathan Haze.

Rich lived in Williamsburg, Brooklyn.

In March 1968, Rich was convicted of failing to report $50,000 of income in 1961 ($538,697 in 2025) and was given five years' probation, fined $2,500 and ordered to pay the IRS $40,000. In July 1969, the IRS placed a tax lien on Rich for $141,606 ($1.24 million in 2025) for back taxes. He filed for bankruptcy the next month, and the IRS seized his home in Las Vegas.

=== Personality ===
Rich was notoriously short-tempered. Singer Dusty Springfield slapped him after several days of "putting up with Rich's insults and show-biz sabotage". He had a rivalry with Frank Sinatra which sometimes ended in brawls when both were members of Tommy Dorsey's band. Nevertheless, they remained lifelong friends, and Sinatra delivered a eulogy at Rich's funeral in 1987. In 1983, Rich underwent quadruple bypass surgery, and was often visited by Sinatra in the hospital. Billy Cobham said that he met Rich in a club as a youth asking him to sign his snare drum, but Rich "dropped it down the stairs".

Rich held a black belt in karate, which proved beneficial to him, his temper, and his health.

According to bassist Bill Crow, Rich reacted strongly to Max Roach's increasing popularity when he was the drummer for Charlie Parker, especially when a jazz critic stated Roach had topped Rich as the world's greatest drummer. Drummer John JR Robinson told Crow he was with Roach when Rich drove by with a beautiful woman seated next to him and yelled, "Hey, Max! Top this!" Nonetheless, the two worked together on the 1959 album Rich Versus Roach, and Roach appeared on the 1994 Rich tribute album Burning for Buddy.

Rich's temper was documented in a series of secret recordings made on tour buses and in dressing rooms by pianist Lee Musiker, who concealed a compact tape recorder in his clothing while on tour with Rich in the early 1980s. On one recording, Rich threatens to fire trombonist Dave Panichi for having a beard. Although he threatened many times to fire members of his band, he seldom did so and, for the most part, praised his musicians in television and print interviews. The day before his death, April 1, 1987, Rich was visited by Mel Tormé, who claimed that one of Rich's last requests was to hear the tapes of his angry outbursts. Tormé was working on an authorized biography of Rich and included excerpts of the tapes in the book, but he never played the tapes for Rich.

In Mel Tormé's biography of Rich, he notes how Rich was tough on his band, but there were a few instances when some members stood up to him. One departing musician told Rich, "I came to this band to play music, not join the Marines!" Another instance was when an Australian musician loudly debated with Buddy in the bus.

Tormé also was familiar with Rich's dislike of rock and roll music, but he also wrote how Rich responded graciously when meeting rock drummers who cited him as an influence or expressed admiration: "when some of these rock drummers came to greet Buddy after a show, he was always charming and polite. And he never, at least in my presence, disparaged them in any way." Rich also held a low opinion of country music, which he considered "a giant step backwards", and opined that "the young people ... need to realize that there's a lot more to music than just playing one chord or two chords". During medical therapy following a brain tumor operation, a nurse inquiring about drug allergies asked Rich whether there was anything he couldn't take. He replied, "Yes, country and western music."

=== Death ===
Rich toured and performed until the end of his life. In early March 1987, he was touring in New York when he was hospitalized after suffering a paralysis on his left side that physicians believed had been caused by a stroke. He was transferred to California to UCLA Medical Center in Los Angeles for tests, where doctors discovered and removed a brain tumor on March 16. He was discharged a week later, but continued to receive daily chemotherapy treatments at the hospital. On April 2, 1987, he died of unexpected respiratory and cardiac failure after a treatment related to the malignant brain tumor. His wife Marie and daughter Cathy buried him in Westwood Village Memorial Park Cemetery in Los Angeles. He was 69.

Since Rich's death, a number of memorial concerts have been held. In 1994, the Rich tribute album Burning for Buddy: A Tribute to the Music of Buddy Rich was released. Produced by Rush drummer/lyricist Neil Peart, the album features performances of Rich staples by a number of jazz and rock drummers such as Joe Morello, Steve Gadd, Max Roach, Billy Cobham, Dave Weckl, Simon Phillips, Steve Smith and Peart, accompanied by the Buddy Rich Big Band. A second volume was issued in 1997. Phil Collins was featured in a DVD tribute organized by Rich's daughter, A Salute to Buddy Rich, which included Steve Smith and Dennis Chambers.

== Legacy ==
Rich's technique, including speed, smooth execution and precision, is one of the most coveted in drumming and has become a common standard. Gene Krupa described him as "the greatest drummer ever to have drawn breath". Roger Taylor, drummer of Queen, acknowledged Rich as the best drummer he ever saw for sheer technique. Blink-182 drummer Travis Barker has credited Rich as the greatest drummer of all time.

His influence extends from jazz to rock music, including drummers such as Dave Weckl, Vinnie Colaiuta, Adam Nussbaum, Simon Phillips, Hal Blaine, John Bonham, Carl Palmer, Ian Paice, Gregg Bissonette, Jojo Mayer, Tré Cool, Bill Ward, and Max Weinberg. Phil Collins stopped using two bass drums and started playing the hi-hat after reading Rich's opinion on the importance of the hi-hat.

Rich is referenced in the 2014 film Whiplash as the idol of the protagonist Andrew Neiman.

== Awards and honors ==
In 1980, Rich was awarded an honorary doctorate of music from Berklee College of Music.

In 1986, a year before his death, Rich was elected into the Percussive Arts Society Hall of Fame in the category of bandleader, and drum set player.

On September 30, 2017, Rich was honored with a Star on the Palm Springs Walk of Stars.

In 2016, readers of Rolling Stone magazine ranked Rich No. 15 in their list of the 100 Greatest Drummers of all time. In a readers' poll in 2011, he ranked No. 6.

== Instruments ==
Rich used and endorsed Ludwig, Slingerland, and Rogers drums. While endorsing Slingerland in the '60s and '70s, Rich sometimes used a Fibes snare drum together with a Slingerland drum kit. He switched exclusively to Ludwig in the late 1970s through the early 1980s. While recovering from a heart attack in 1983, Rich was presented with a 1940s-vintage Slingerland Radio King set, refurbished by Joe MacSweeney of Eames Drums, which he used until his death in 1987. Rich's typical setup included a 14"×24" bass drum, a 9"×13" mounted tom, two 16"×16" floor toms (with the second tom usually serving as a towel holder), and a 5.5"×14" snare drum. His cymbals were typically Avedis Zildjian: 14" New Beat hi-hats, 20" medium ride, 8" splash, two 18" crashes (thin and medium-thin). Sometimes a 6" splash and later a 22" swish. He also used Remo drumheads and Slingerland drumsticks. He also had his own signature sticks. He used Ludwig Speed King or a Rogers bass drum pedal at various times in his career.

== Discography ==
=== As leader/co-leader ===
- The Flip Phillips Buddy Rich Trio (Clef, 1953)
- The Swinging Buddy Rich (Norgran, 1954)
- Buddy and Sweets (Norgran, 1955)
- Sing and Swing with Buddy Rich (Norgran, 1955)
- The Lester Young Buddy Rich Trio with Lester Young (Norgran, 1955)
- Krupa and Rich (Clef, 1956)
- Buddy Rich Sings Johnny Mercer (Verve, 1956)
- The Lionel Hampton Art Tatum Buddy Rich Trio (Clef, 1956)
- The Wailing Buddy Rich (Norgran, 1956)
- This One's for Basie (Verve, 1957)
- Buddy Rich Just Sings (Verve, 1957)
- Buddy Rich in Miami (Verve, 1958)
- Rich Versus Roach (Mercury, 1959)
- The Voice is Rich (Mercury, 1959)
- Richcraft (Mercury, 1959)
- Playtime (Argo, 1961)
- Burnin' Beat with Gene Krupa (Verve, 1962)
- Blues Caravan (Verve, 1962)
- The Sounds of '66 with Sammy Davis Jr. (Reprise, 1966)
- Swingin' New Big Band (Pacific Jazz, 1966)
- Big Swing Face (Pacific Jazz, 1967)
- The Driver (EmArcy, 1967)
- The New One! (Pacific Jazz, 1968)
- Rich à la Rakha (Liberty, 1968)
- Mercy, Mercy (Pacific Jazz, 1968)
- Buddy & Soul (Pacific Jazz, 1969)
- Keep the Customer Satisfied (Liberty, 1970)
- Are You Ready for This? (Roost, 1971)
- A Different Drummer (RCA Victor, 1971)
- Conversations (EMI-Parlophone, 1972)
- Rich in London (RCA Victor, 1972)
- Stick It (RCA Victor, 1972)
- The Roar of '74 (Groove Merchant, 1974)
- The Last Blues Album Volume 1 (Groove Merchant, 1974)
- Transition with Lionel Hampton (Groove Merchant, 1974)
- Very Live at Buddy's Place (Groove Merchant, 1974)
- One Night Stand with Buddy Rich 1946 (Joyce, 1974)
- One Night Stand with Buddy Rich 1946 Vol. 2 (Joyce, 1975)
- Big Band Machine (Groove Merchant, 1975)
- Film Tracks of Buddy Rich and Gene Krupa (Joyce, 1976)
- Speak No Evil (RCA, 1976)
- Buddy Rich Plays and Plays and Plays (RCA, 1977)
- Lionel Hampton Presents Buddy Rich (Who's Who in Jazz, 1977)
- Class of '78 (Century, 1978)
- Together Again: For the First Time with Mel Tormé (Gryphon/Century, 1978)
- The Bull (Chiaroscuro, 1980)
- Live at Ronnie Scott's (DRG, 1980)
- Buddy Rich Band (MCA, 1981)
- I'm Always Chasing Rainbows (BL Enterprise, 1981)
- Live at the 1982 Montreal Jazz Festival (Hudson Music, 1982) [DVD-Video +CD]
- Rich and Famous (Amway, 1983)
- Tuff Dude (Denon, 1986)
- Mr. Drums: ... Live on King Street, San Francisco (Cafe, 1986)

Posthumous releases

- Europe '77 (Magic, 1993)
- Buddy Rich & His Big Band At Stadthalle Leonberg, Germany 10 July 1986 (Jazz Band, 1996)
- Wham! The Buddy Rich Big Band Live (Label M, 2000)
- No Funny Hats (Lightyear, 2004)
- Time Out (Lightyear, 2007)
- The Solos (Lightyear Entertainment, 2014)
- Birdland (Lightyear Entertainment, 2015)
- Just In Time: The Final Recording (Gearbox, 2019)
- Trios (Lightyear Entertainment, 2023)

=== As sideman ===
With Count Basie

- 1952: Basie Jazz (Clef, 1954)
- 1952: The Swinging Count! (Clef, 1956)
- compilation: Blues by Basie (Columbia, 1956)

With Benny Carter

- 1952: Alone Together (Norgran, 1955)
- 1954: Benny Carter Plays Pretty (Norgran, 1955)
- 1954: New Jazz Sounds (Norgran, 1955)

With Harry James

- 1953: Radio Discs of Harry James (Joyce LP 2002, 1975)
- 1953: One Night Stand With Harry James (Joyce LP 1014, 1977)
- 1953: One Night Stand (Sandy Hook SH 2004, 1978)
- 1953: One Night Stand With Buddy Rich & Harry James (Joyce LP 1078, 1980)
- 1953/1958: One Night Stand With Harry James at The Blue Note (Joyce LP 1124, 1983)
- 1953/1962: Live! (Sunbeam SB 230, 1979)
- 1953–1954: Saturday Night Swing (Giants of Jazz Productions GOJ LP-1016, 1979)
- 1954: 1954 Broadcasts (Sunbeam SB 217, 1976)
- 1954?: Trumpet After Midnight (Columbia CL 553 and B-410, 1954)
- 1954?: Dancing In Person With Harry James At The Hollywood Palladium (Columbia CL 562 and B-428, 1954)
- 1953–1954: Juke Box Jamboree (Columbia CL 615, 1955)
- 1956: Harry James and His New Jazz Band, Vol. 1 / Vol. 2 (Mr. Music MMCD 7010/7012, 2002)
- 1957: Wild About Harry! (Capitol T 874 / ST 874, 1967) (Note: Buddy Rich appears on Wild About Harry! under the pseudonym "Buddy Poor" since Rich was still under contract to Verve Records at the time.)
- 1963: Double Dixie (MGM E-4137 / SE-4137, 1963).
- 1964: 1964 Live! In The Holiday Ballroom Chicago (Jazz Hour Compact Classics JH-1001, 1989) – live
- 1964: One Night Stand With Harry James on Tour in '64 (Joyce LP 1074, 1979)
- 1964: In a Relaxed Mood (MGM SE-4274, 1964)
- 1964: New Versions of Down Beat Favorites (MGM SE-4265, 1964)
- 1965?: Harry James Plays Green Onions & Other Great Hits (Dot DLP 3634 / DLP 25634, 1965)
- 1965: Harry James, Buddy Rich, Woody Herman (Europa Jazz EJ 1041, 1981)
- 1966: The Ballads and the Beat! (Dot DLP 3669 / DLP 25669, 1966)

Notes

With others

- 1946: Lester Young, Nat King Cole (not originally credited) Lester Young Trio (Mercury, 1951)
- 1950: Bud Powell, The Genius of Bud Powell (Mercury/Clef, 1956)
- 1950–1952: Charlie Parker, Big Band (Clef, 1954)
- 1952: Gene Krupa, The Drum Battle (Verve, 1960)
- 1953?: Harry "Sweets" Edison, Sweets at the Haig (Pacific Jazz, 1953)
- 1954: Lionel Hampton, Lionel Hampton Plays Love Songs (Verve, 1956)
- 1954: Roy Eldridge, Little Jazz, (Clef, 1954)
- 1955: Lester Young and Harry Edison, Pres and Sweets (Norgran, 1955)
- 1955: Oscar Peterson, Oscar Peterson Plays Count Basie (Clef, 1956)
- 1956: Ella Fitzgerald and Louis Armstrong, Ella and Louis (Verve, 1956)
- 1958?: Tommy Dorsey, Having Wonderful Time (RCA Victor, 1958)
- 1969: Stan Getz, The Song Is You (Laserlight, 1996)
- 1982: Frank Sinatra, Sinatra: World On a String (Universal, 2016)
