= Dave Panichi =

Australian musician

- Genres: Jazz
- Occupation: Trombonist - Composer
- Instrument: Trombone
- Years active: 1975-present
- Website: davepanichimusic.com

Dave Panichi is an Australian jazz Musician, trombonist and composer who began his professional musical career in 1975.

In 1981 Panichi moved to New York, where he lived for 18 years. During this time he performed with notable artists including the Buddy Rich Big Band, Toshiko Akiyoshi, Blood Sweat & Tears, Slide Hampton, Bob Mintzer, Maria Schneider, Frank Sinatra, Sarah Vaughan, Joe Williams, Aretha Franklin, Mel Tormé, Peabo Bryson, Dave Liebman, Mulgrew Miller and Marc Copland.

In 2000, Panichi moved back to Australia where he is currently active in teaching, performing, and composing. He is currently a casual lecturer in trombone at Sydney Conservatorium of Music.

Drummer Buddy Rich threatened to fire Panichi during his time with Rich's band for having a beard. The altercation was taped and included in a series of bootlegs showcasing Rich's temper.

== Awards ==
- Don Banks Memorial Scholarship by the Australia Council
