= Who's Who in Jazz =

American record label from 1977 to 2000

- Founded: 1977
- Founder: Lionel Hampton
- Defunct: 2000
- Status: Defunct
- Genre: Jazz
- Country of origin: U.S.
- Location: New York City

Who's Who in Jazz was a record label based in New York City, formed by Lionel Hampton in 1977 or 1978, and distributed by the Gillette Madison Company (GEMCON). It specialized in jazz albums and later CDs and released a half dozen recordings of Hampton entitled "Lionel Hampton Presents" followed by a musician's name. These recordings featured Hampton performing with the person named in the title (see external links, below.) The company operated from about 1977 to 2000. Among the records were early recordings of Wynton Marsalis playing with Art Blakey & the Jazz Messengers from 1980.

== Select discography ==
- Wynton, Wynton Marsalis, with Art Blakey & the Jazz Messengers. Recorded live at Bubba's Jazz Restaurant, October 11, 1980. WWLP-21024 (digital master, 1983)
