= Earl Watkins =

American jazz musician

Earl Thomas Watkins, Jr. (January 29, 1920, in San Francisco – July 1, 2007, in San Francisco) was an American jazz drummer.

Watkins was a percussionist in a United States Navy band during World War II, and returned to San Francisco after the war. He played with Wilbert Baranco in 1946 and did extensive work as a sideman and session musician in the 1950s, including with Kid Ory, Flip Phillips, Muggsy Spanier, and Bob Scobey. He joined Earl Hines's ensemble in San Francisco, touring and recording with him until 1961.
