= Verve Records discography =

This is the complete discography of the main 12-inch (8000) series of LPs issued by Verve Records, a label founded in 1956 by producer Norman Granz in Los Angeles, California. Alongside new sessions Granz re-released many of the recordings of his earlier labels Clef and Norgran on Verve.

The primal sessions issued on Verve were one of Charlie Parker with Lester Young performing "Lady Be Good" (8002, 8840), and of the Gene Krupa Trio (8031, licensed to Mercury beforehand) both at the "Philharmonic Auditorium" in Los Angeles, on January 28, 1946. In April that year a Jazz Recital with Billie Holiday was recorded, previously a Clef album, now reissued on the new label. And a former Norgram issue of a radio broadcast capturing a rare trio formation consisting of Lester Young, Nat King Cole and Buddy Rich. The incessant matching of musicians of different generations and schools is strongly associated with Norman Granz whose long-lasting Jazz at the Philharmonic concert project was also part of his work as a record producer. Although JATP concerts appear here, some are not listed here; they were issued in the MG VOL 1-11 sequence, which is not part of this discography, as much as the 78 rpm and 45 rpm LP and single series. Other JATP concerts first appeared on Granz later Pablo Records label, which also reissued the Art Tatum recordings listed below which he had reacquired. Also absent is the Down Home series dedicated to documenting surviving early jazz players and revivalists.

Beside the already mentioned musicians the Verve catalog comprised a good share of prominent jazz musicians of the 1940s to '60s, featuring Count Basie, Woody Herman, and Lionel Hampton. The 4000 series was dedicated to projects involving Ella Fitzgerald is not listed here (but is partially included on her discography page), nor is the 2000 series dedicated to other singers including Anita O'Day, although some of these were later reissued in the 8000 series.

After Norman Granz sold Verve to MGM in 1961, Creed Taylor was designated as producer for the label. He followed a more commercial policy, including the successful Bossa Nova albums of Stan Getz, but Taylor left five years later. Other younger musicians such as Bill Evans, Wes Montgomery, Gerry Mulligan and Jimmy Smith recorded extensively for the label during this period. Verve Folkways (see Verve Forecast) established by Taylor as a subsidiary is not tabulated here either. However, Frank Zappa's Lumpy Gravy (8741), and an album by Alan Lorber (8711) are to be found here. The most recent recordings issued (and listed here) date from 1973, with organist Jimmy Smith accompanied by an orchestra under Thad Jones (8832), and Casting Pearls by the blues-rock formation Mill Valley Bunch (8825).

== Discography ==
=== 8000 Jazz Series ===
The Verve 8000 Jazz Series of LP Records commenced in 1956 with reissues of Clef and Norgran material but soon progressed to issuing new recordings by artists that included Count Basie, Louis Bellson, Dizzy Gillespie, Sonny Stitt, Johnny Hodges, Ben Webster, Lester Young and others. The series features several best-selling and influential jazz albums such as Oscar Peterson's Night Train (1963) and Stan Getz and João Gilberto's Getz/Gilberto (1964) which included "The Girl from Ipanema". The series initially used a catalog number prefix MGV but converted to V/V6 after the label was sold to MGM in 1961 when mono and stereo versions were released simultaneously with the same number. The prefix MGV (mono) was used until 8398, some titles were issued in the MGVS (stereo) 6000 series during 1959–60. Following the change of ownership, after a brief period when a new prefix V/V6 was also used (8399-8407), it entirely superseded the earlier practice. Later issues of earlier titles used the new prefix with 8000 numbers regardless of the mono/stereo distinction (the 6000 series was dropped). The series concluded in 1974. Numbers not appearing were not used for any issue (63 in total).

Catalog No.	Artist	Album	Notes
MGV 8000	Charlie Parker	The Charlie Parker Story #1	
MGV 8001	Charlie Parker	The Charlie Parker Story #2	
MGV 8002	Charlie Parker	The Charlie Parker Story #3	8000-8002 reissued as 8100-3
MGV 8003	Charlie Parker	Night and Day	The Genius of Charlie Parker #1
MGV 8004	Charlie Parker	April in Paris	The Genius of Charlie Parker #2 - Reissue of Clef MGC 675
MGV 8005	Charlie Parker	Now's the Time	The Genius of Charlie Parker #3
MGV 8006	Charlie Parker	Bird and Diz	The Genius of Charlie Parker #4
MGV 8007	Charlie Parker	Charlie Parker Plays Cole Porter	The Genius of Charlie Parker #5
MGV 8008	Charlie Parker	Fiesta	The Genius of Charlie Parker #6
MGV 8009	Charlie Parker	Jazz Perennial	The Genius of Charlie Parker #7
MGV 8010	Charlie Parker	Swedish Schnapps	The Genius of Charlie Parker #8
MGV 8011	Tal Farlow	Fascinatin' Rhythm	The Guitar Artistry of Tal Farlow - Reissue of Norgran MGN 1027 and MGN 1011
MGV 8012	Count Basie and His Orchestra	April in Paris	
MGV 8013	Art Tatum, Benny Carter and Louis Bellson	The Three Giants	
MGV 8014	Woody Herman	Jazz the Utmost!	Reissue of Clef MGC 745
MGV 8015	Dizzy Gillespie / Django Reinhardt	Jazz from Paris	split album
MGV 8016	Louis Bellson Quintet	Concerto for Drums by Louis Bellson	Reissue of Norgran MGN 1011
MGV 8017	Dizzy Gillespie	Dizzy in Greece	
MGV 8018	Count Basie	Basie Roars Again	Selections from Dance Session and Dance Session Album #2
MGV 8019	Lionel Hampton	Travelin' Band	Reissue of Clef MGC 670
MGV 8020	Ben Webster	King of the Tenors	Reissue of Norgran MGN 1001
MGV 8021	Tal Farlow	Tal	Reissue of Norgran MGN 1102
MGV 8022	Ray Brown	Bass Hit!	
MGV 8023	Illinois Jacquet	Swing's the Thing	Reissue of Clef MGC 750
MGV 8024	Oscar Peterson	Oscar Peterson at the Stratford Shakespearean Festival	
MGV 8025	Phil Nimmons	The Canadian Scene Via Phil Nimmons	
MGV 8026	Billie Holiday	Music for Torching	Reissue of Clef MGC 669
MGV 8027	Billie Holiday	A Recital by Billie Holiday	Reissue of Clef MGC 686
MGV 8028	Stan Getz	West Coast Jazz	Reissue of Norgran MGN 1032
MGV 8029	Stan Getz	Stan Getz '57	Reissue of Norgran MGN 1087
MGV 8030	Metronome All-Stars	Metronome All-Stars 1956	Reissue of Clef MGC 743
MGV 8031	Gene Krupa	The Gene Krupa Trio at JatP	
MGV 8036	Art Tatum	The Genius of Art Tatum #1	Reissue of Clef MGC 612
MGV 8037	Art Tatum	The Genius of Art Tatum #2	Reissue of Clef MGC 613
MGV 8038	Art Tatum	The Genius of Art Tatum #3	Reissue of Clef MGC 614
MGV 8039	Art Tatum	The Genius of Art Tatum #4	Reissue of Clef MGC 615
MGV 8040	Art Tatum	The Genius of Art Tatum #5	Reissue of Clef MGC 618
MGV 8049	Various Artists	Norman Granz' Jam Session #1	Reissue of Mercury MGC 601
MGV 8050	Various Artists	Norman Granz' Jam Session #2	Reissue of Mercury MGC 602
MGV 8051	Various Artists	Norman Granz' Jam Session #3	Reissue of Clef MGC 4003
MGV 8052	Various Artists	Norman Granz' Jam Session #4	Reissue of Clef MGC 4004
MGV 8053	Various Artists	Norman Granz' Jam Session #5	Reissue of Clef MGC 4005
MGV 8054	Various Artists	Norman Granz' Jam Session #6	Reissue of Clef MGC 4006
MGV 8055	Art Tatum	The Genius of Art Tatum #6	Reissue of Clef MGC 657
MGV 8056	Art Tatum	The Genius of Art Tatum #7	Reissue of Clef MGC 658
MGV 8057	Art Tatum	The Genius of Art Tatum #8	Reissue of Clef MGC 659
MGV 8058	Art Tatum	The Genius of Art Tatum #9	Reissue of Clef MGC 660
MGV 8059	Art Tatum	The Genius of Art Tatum #10	Reissue of Clef MGC 661
MGV 8060	Various Artists	The Jazz Scene	Reissue of Clef MGC 4007
MGV 8061	Illinois Jacquet	Illinois Jacquet and His Orchestra	Reissue of Clef MGC 676
MGV 8062	Various Artists	Norman Granz' Jam Session #7	Reissue of Clef MGC 677
MGV 8063	Count Basie and Joe Williams	Count Basie Swings, Joe Williams Sings	Reissue of Clef MGC 678
MGV 8064	Art Tatum, Roy Eldridge, Alvin Stoller and John Simmons	The Art Tatum-Roy Eldridge-Alvin Stoller-John Simmons Quartet	Reissue of Clef MGC 679
MGV 8065	Illinois Jacquet and Ben Webster	The Kid and the Brute	Reissue of Clef MGC 680
MGV 8066	Gene Krupa, Lionel Hampton and Teddy Wilson	Playing Some of the Selections They Played in The Benny Goodman Movie	Reissue of Clef MGC 681
MGV 8067	Lawrance Brown	Slide Trombone	Reissue of Clef MGC 682
MGV 8068	Roy Eldridge	Little Jazz	Reissue of Clef MGC 683
MGV 8069	Gene Krupa and Buddy Rich	Krupa and Rich	Reissue of Clef MGC 684
MGV 8070	Count Basie	The Count!	Reissue of Clef MGC 685
MGV 8071	Gene Krupa	The Exciting Gene Krupa and His Quartet	Reissue of Clef MGC 687
MGV 8072	Oscar Peterson	The Oscar Peterson Quartet #1	Reissue of Clef MGC 688
MGV 8073	Machito	Afro-Cuban Jazz	Reissue of Clef MGC 689
MGV 8074	Billie Holiday	Solitude	Reissue of Clef MGC 690
MGV 8075	Flip Phillips	Flip Wails	Reissue of Clef MGC 691
MGV 8076	Flip Phillips	Swinging with Flip Phillips and His Orchestra	Reissue of Clef MGC 692
MGV 8077	Flip Phillips	Flip	Reissue of Clef MGC 693
MGV 8078	Oscar Peterson	Recital by Oscar Peterson	Reissue of Clef MGC 694
MGV 8079	Oscar Peterson	Nostalgic Memories by Oscar Peterson	Reissue of Clef MGC 695
MGV 8080	Oscar Peterson	Music by Oscar Peterson: Tenderly	Reissue of Clef MGC 696
MGV 8081	Oscar Peterson	Music by Oscar Peterson: Keyboard	Reissue of Clef MGC 697
MGV 8082	Oscar Peterson	An Evening with Oscar Peterson	Reissue of Clef MGC 698
MGV 8083	Chico O'Farrill	Jazz North and South of the Border	Reissue of Clef MGC 699
MGV 8084	Illinois Jacquet	Jazz Moode	Reissue of Clef MGC 700
MGV 8085	Illinois Jacquet	Port of Rico	Reissue of Clef MGC 701
MGV 8086	Illinois Jacquet	Groovin'	Reissue of Clef MGC 702
MGV 8087	Gene Krupa	Drum Boogie	Reissue of Clef MGC 703
MGV 8088	Roy Eldridge	Rockin' Chair	Reissue of Clef MGC 704
MGV 8089	Roy Eldridge	Dale's Wail	Reissue of Clef MGC 705
MGV 8090	Count Basie Sextet	The Swinging Count!	Reissue of Clef MGC 706
MGV 8091	Hank Jones	Urbanity	Reissue of Clef MGC 707
MGV 8092	Oscar Peterson	Oscar Peterson Plays Count Basie	Reissue of Clef MGC 708
MGV 8093	Lionel Hampton, Art Tatum and Buddy Rich	The Lionel Hampton Art Tatum Buddy Rich Trio	Reissue of Clef MGC 709
MGV 8094	Various Artists	Norman Granz' Jam Session #8	Reissue of Clef MGC 711
MGV 8095	Art Tatum	The Genius of Art Tatum #11	Reissue of Clef MGC 712
MGV 8096	Billie Holiday	Velvet Mood	Reissue of Clef MGC 713
MGV 8097	Harry Edison	Sweets	Reissue of Clef MGC 717
MGV 8098	Billie Holiday/Ralph Burns	Jazz Recital	split album - Reissue of Clef MGC 718
MGV 8099	Billie Holiday	Lady Sings the Blues	Reissue of Clef MGC 721
MGV 8100-3	Charlie Parker	The Charlie Parker Story	3 LP Set - Reissue of MGV 8000/8001/8002
MGV 8101-5	Art Tatum	The Genius of Art Tatum #1	5 LP Set - Reissue of Clef MGC 612/613/614/615/618
MGV 8102-5	Art Tatum	The Genius of Art Tatum #2	5 LP Set - Reissue of Clef MGC 657/658/659/660/661
MGV 8103	Count Basie	The Band of Distinction	Reissue of Clef MGC 666
MGV 8104	Count Basie	The King of Swing	Reissue of Clef MGC 724
MGV 8105	Lionel Hampton	King of the Vibes	Reissue of Clef MGC 726
MGV 8106	Lionel Hampton	Air Mail Special	Reissue of Clef MGC 727
MGV 8107	Gene Krupa	The Driving Gene Krupa	Reissue of Clef MGC 631
MGV 8108	Count Basie and His Orchestra	Basie Rides Again!	Reissue of Clef MGC 729
MGV 8109	Roy Eldridge and Dizzy Gillespie	Trumpet Battle	Reissue of Clef MGC 730
MGV 8110	Roy Eldridge and Dizzy Gillespie	The Trumpet Kings	Reissue of Clef MGC 731
MGV 8111	Bob Brookmeyer	The Modernity of Bob Brookmeyer	Reissue of Clef MGC 644
MGV 8112	Lionel Hampton	Flying Home	Reissue of Clef MGC 735
MGV 8113	Lionel Hampton	Swingin' with Hamp	Reissue of Clef MGC 736
MGV 8114	Lionel Hampton	Hamp!	Reissue of Clef MGC 673
MGV 8115	Bud Powell	The Genius of Bud Powell	Reissue of Mercury MGC 610
MGV 8116	Flip Phillips	Rock with Flip	Reissue of Clef MGC 637
MGV 8117	Lionel Hampton	Hamp's Big Four	Reissue of Clef MGC 744
MGV 8118	Art Tatum	Presenting the Art Tatum Trio	
MGV 8119	Various Artists	Jazz at Saint-Germain des Prés	
MGV 8121	Ralph Burns	Ralph Burns Among the JatP's	Reissue of Norgran MGN 1028
MGV 8122	Stan Getz	Interpretations by the Stan Getz Quintet #3	Reissue of Norgran MGN 1029
MGV 8123	Tal Farlow	A Recital by Tal Farlow	Reissue of Norgran MGN 1030
MGV 8124	Various Artists	Swing Guitars	Reissue of Norgran MGN 1033
MGV 8125	Various Artists	Tenor Saxes	Reissue of Norgran MGN 1034
MGV 8126	Various Artists	Alto Saxes	Reissue of Norgran MGN 1035
MGV 8127	Various Artists	Piano Interpretations	Reissue of Norgran MGN 1036
MGV 8128	Lionel Hampton and Stan Getz	Hamp and Getz	Reissue of Norgran MGN 1037
MGV 8129	Buddy Rich and Harry Edison	Buddy and Sweets	Reissue of Norgran MGN 1038
MGV 8130	Ben Webster with Strings	Music with Feeling	Reissue of Norgran MGN 1039
MGV 8131	John Lewis	The Modern Jazz Society Presents a Concert of Contemporary Music	Reissue of Norgran MGN 1040
MGV 8132	Charlie Ventura	Charlie Ventura's Carnegie Hall Concert	Reissue of Norgran MGN 1041
MGV 8133	Stan Getz	Stan Getz Plays	Reissue of Norgran MGN 1042
MGV 8134	Lester Young and Harry Edison	Pres and Sweets	Reissue of Norgran MGN 1043
MGV 8135	Benny Carter	New Jazz Sounds	Reissue of Norgran MGN 1044
MGV 8136	Johnny Hodges	Creamy	Reissue of Norgran MGN 1045
MGV 8137	Louis Bellson and His Orchestra	Skin Deep	Reissue of Norgran MGN 1046
MGV 8138	Tal Farlow	The Tal Farlow Album	Reissue of Norgran MGN 1047
MGV 8139	Johnny Hodges	Castle Rock	Reissue of Norgran MGN 1048
MGV 8140	Anita O'Day	The Lady Is a Tramp	Reissue of Norgran MGN 1049
MGV 8141	Dizzy Gillespie and Stan Getz	Diz and Getz	Reissue of Norgran MGN 1050
MGV 8142	Buddy Rich	The Swinging Buddy Rich	Reissue of Norgran MGN 1052
MGV 8143	Mary Ann McCall and Charlie Ventura	An Evening with Mary Ann McCall and Charlie Ventura	Reissue of Norgran MGN 1053
MGV 8144	Lester Young and Oscar Peterson	The Pres-Ident Plays with the Oscar Peterson Trio	Reissue of Norgran MGN 1054
MGV 8145	Johnny Hodges	Ellingtonia '56	Reissue of Norgran MGN 1055
MGV 8146	Lester Young, Roy Eldridge, Vic Dickenson, Teddy Wilson, Freddie Greene, Gene Ramey, Jo Jones	The Jazz Giants '56	Reissue of Norgran MGN 1056
MGV 8147	Anita O'Day	An Evening with Anita O'Day	Unissued rerelease of Norgran MGN 1057
MGV 8148	Benny Carter and Oscar Peterson	Alone Together	Reissue of Norgran MGN 1058
MGV 8149	Johnny Hodges	In a Tender Mood	Reissue of Norgran MGN 1059
MGV 8150	Johnny Hodges	Used to Be Duke	Reissue of Norgran MGN 1060
MGV 8151	Johnny Hodges	The Blues	Reissue of Norgran MGN 1061
MGV 8152	Bill Harris	The Bill Harris Herd	Reissue of Norgran MGN 1062
MGV 8153	Bud Powell	Jazz Giant	Reissue of Norgran MGN 1063
MGV 8154	Bud Powell	Bud Powell's Moods	Reissue of Norgran MGN 1064
MGV 8155	Various Artists	An Evening of Jazz	Reissue of Norgran MGN 1065
MGV 8156	Kenny Drew	Kenny Drew and His Progressive Piano	Reissue of Norgran MGN 1002
MGV 8157	Jack Costanzo / Andre's All Stars	Afro-Cubano	split album - Reissue of Norgran MGN 1067
MGV 8158	Buddy DeFranco	Jazz Tones	Reissue of Norgran MGN 1068
MGV 8159	Buddy DeFranco	Mr. Clarinet	Reissue of Norgran MGN 1026
MGV 8160	Benny Carter	Cosmopolite	Reissue of Norgran MGN 1070
MGV 8161	Lester Young	Lester's Here	Reissue of Norgran MGN 1071
MGV 8162	Lester Young	Pres	Reissue of Norgran MGN 1072
MGV 8163	Charlie Ventura	In a Jazz Mood	Reissue of Norgran MGN 1073
MGV 8164	Lester Young and Buddy Rich	The Lester Young Buddy Rich Trio	Reissue of Norgran MGN 1074
MGV 8165	Charlie Ventura	Blue Saxophone	Reissue of Norgran MGN 1075
MGV 8166	Dizzy Gillespie	The Modern Jazz Sextet	Reissue of Norgran MGN 1076
MGV 8167	Bud Powell	Piano Interpretations by Bud Powell	Reissue of Norgran MGN 1077
MGV 8168	Buddy Rich	The Wailing Buddy Rich	Reissue of Norgran MGN 1078
MGV 8169	Buddy DeFranco	In a Mellow Mood	Reissue of Norgran MGN 1079
MGV 8170	Lionel Hampton	Lionel Hampton and His Giants	Reissue of Norgran MGN 1080
MGV 8171	Herb Ellis	Ellis in Wonderland	Reissue of Norgran MGN 1081
MGV 8172	Billy Bauer	Billy Bauer Plectrist	Reissue of Norgran MGN 1082
MGV 8173	Dizzy Gillespie	Jazz Recital	Reissue of Norgran MGN 1083
MGV 8174	Dizzy Gillespie	World Statesman	Reissue of Norgran MGN 1084
MGV 8175	Buddy DeFranco	The Buddy DeFranco Wailers	Reissue of Norgran MGN 1085
MGV 8176	Buddy Rich	This One's for Basie	Reissue of Norgran MGN 1086
MGV 8177	Stan Getz	More West Coast Jazz with Stan Getz	Reissue of Norgran MGN 1088
MGV 8178	Dizzy Gillespie	Diz Big Band	Reissue of Norgran MGN 1023
MGV 8179	Johnny Hodges	Perdido	Reissue of Norgran MGN 1024
MGV 8180	Johnny Hodges	In a Mellow Tone	Reissue of Norgran MGN 1004
MGV 8181	Lester Young	Lester Swings Again	Reissue of Norgran MGN 1005
MGV 8182	Buddy DeFranco	Odalisque	Reissue of Norgran MGN 1006
MGV 8183	Buddy DeFranco	Autumn Leaves	Reissue of Norgran MGN 1012
MGV 8184	Tal Farlow	The Guitar Artistry of Tal Farlow: Autumn in New York	Reissue of Norgran MGN 1014
MGV 8185	Bud Powell	Bud Powell '57	Reissue of Norgran MGN 1017
MGV 8186	Louis Bellson and His Orchestra	The Hawk Talks	Reissue of Norgran MGN 1020
MGV 8187	Lester Young	It Don't Mean a Thing	Reissue of Norgran MGN 1022
MGV 8188	Stan Getz	Stan Getz at The Shrine	2LP Reissue of Norgran MGN 2000-2
MGV 8189	Various Artists	Midnight Jazz at Carnegie Hall	2LP Reissue of Norgran MGN 3501-2
MGV 8190	Gene Krupa	Sing, Sing, Sing	Reissue of Clef MGC 627
MGV 8191	Dizzy Gillespie	Afro	Reissue of Norgran MGN 1003
MGV 8192	Howard Roberts	Mr. Roberts Plays Guitar	
MGV 8193	Louis Bellson	Drumorama!	
MGV 8194	Various Artists	Verve Compendium of Jazz #1	
MGV 8195	Various Artists	Verve Compendium of Jazz #2	
MGV 8196	Various Artists	Norman Granz' Jam Session #9	
MGV 8197	Billie Holiday	Body and Soul	
MGV 8198	Dizzy Gillespie, Stan Getz and Sonny Stitt	For Musicians Only	
MGV 8199	Count Basie	Basie in London	
MGV 8200	Stan Getz	Stan Getz and the Cool Sounds	
MGV 8201	Tal Farlow	The Swinging Guitar of Tal Farlow	
MGV 8202	Roy Eldridge and Benny Carter	Urbane Jazz	
MGV 8203	Johnny Hodges	Duke's in Bed	
MGV 8204	Gene Krupa	The Jazz Rhythms of Gene Krupa	
MGV 8205	Lester Young and Teddy Wilson	Pres and Teddy	
MGV 8206	Stuff Smith	Stuff Smith	
MGV 8207	Various Artists	Here Come the Swinging Bands	
MGV 8208	Dizzy Gillespie	Manteca	
MGV 8209	Lee Konitz	Very Cool	
MGV 8210	Buddy DeFranco and Oscar Peterson	Buddy DeFranco and the Oscar Peterson Quartet	
MGV 8211	Harry Edison	Gee Baby, Ain't I Good to You	
MGV 8212	Various Artists	Tour de Force	
MGV 8213	Stan Getz	Stan Getz in Stockholm	
MGV 8214	Dizzy Gillespie and Stuff Smith	Dizzy Gillespie and Stuff Smith	
MGV 8215	Lionel Hampton	The Genius of Lionel Hampton	
MGV 8216	Woody Herman	Men from Mars	
MGV 8217	Yusef Lateef	Before Dawn: The Music of Yusef Lateef	
MGV 8218	Bud Powell	Blues in the Closet	
MGV 8219	Sonny Stitt	New York Jazz	
MGV 8220	Art Tatum and Ben Webster	The Art Tatum - Ben Webster Quartet	
MGV 8221	Buddy DeFranco	Cooking the Blues	
MGV 8222	Dizzy Gillespie	Birks' Works	
MGV 8223	Lionel Hampton	Lionel Hampton '58	
MGV 8224	Buddy DeFranco	Sweet and Lovely	
MGV 8225	Dizzy Gillespie	Sittin' In	
MGV 8226	Lionel Hampton	Hallelujah Hamp	
MGV 8227	Art Tatum, Benny Carter and Louis Bellson	Makin' Whoopee	
MGV 8228	Lionel Hampton	The High and the Mighty	
MGV 8229	Art Tatum and Buddy DeFranco	The Art Tatum-Buddy DeFranco Quartet	
MGV 8230	Various Artists	The Anatomy of Improvisation	
MGV 8231	Various Artists	Jazz at the Hollywood Bowl	
MGV 8232	George Lewis / Turk Murphy	George Lewis & Turk Murphy at Newport	split album
MGV 8233	Red Allen, Kid Ory and Jack Teagarden	Red Allen, Kid Ory & Jack Teagarden at Newport	
MGV 8234	Ella Fitzgerald / Billie Holiday	Ella Fitzgerald and Billie Holiday at Newport	split album
MGV 8235	Teddy Wilson Trio / Gerry Mulligan Quartet	The Teddy Wilson Trio & Gerry Mulligan Quartet with Bob Brookmeyer at Newport	split album
MGV 8236	Toshiko Akiyoshi / Leon Sash	Toshiko and Leon Sash at Newport	split album
MGV 8237	Eddie Costa / Mat Mathews / Don Elliott	Eddie Costa, Mat Mathews & Don Elliott at Newport	split album
MGV 8238	Gigi Gryce-Donald Byrd Jazz Lab / Cecil Taylor	The Gigi Gryce-Donald Byrd Jazz Laboratory & the Cecil Taylor Quartet at Newport	split album
MGV 8239	Oscar Peterson, Sonny Stitt, Roy Eldridge and Jo Jones	The Oscar Peterson Trio with Sonny Stitt, Roy Eldridge and Jo Jones at Newport	
MGV 8240	Coleman Hawkins, Roy Eldridge, Pete Brown and Jo Jones	The Coleman Hawkins, Roy Eldridge, Pete Brown, Jo Jones All Stars at Newport	
MGV 8241	Ruby Braff with Pee Wee Russell and Bobby Henderson	The Ruby Braff Octet with Pee Wee Russell & Bobby Henderson at Newport	split album
MGV 8242	Dizzy Gillespie	Dizzy Gillespie at Newport	
MGV 8243	Count Basie	Count Basie at Newport	
MGV 8244	Count Basie and Joe Williams / Dizzy Gillespie and Mary Lou Williams	Count Basie & Joe Williams / Dizzy Gillespie & Mary Lou Williams at Newport	
MGV 8245	The Drinkard Singers / Back Home Choir	Gospel Singing at Newport	split album
MGV 8246	Gerry Mulligan and Paul Desmond	Gerry Mulligan - Paul Desmond Quartet	
MGV 8247	Herbie Mann	The Magic Flute of Herbie Mann	
MGV 8248	Stan Getz, Harry Edison, Gerry Mulligan with Louis Bellson and the Oscar Peterson Trio	Jazz Giants '58	
MGV 8249	Stan Getz and Gerry Mulligan	Gerry Mulligan Meets Stan Getz	
MGV 8250	Sonny Stitt	Only the Blues	
MGV 8251	Stan Getz and Oscar Peterson	Stan Getz and the Oscar Peterson Trio	
MGV 8252	Herb Ellis	Nothing But the Blues	
MGV 8253	Bert Dahlander and His Swedish Jazz	Skål	
MGV 8254	Kid Ory	Kid Ory in Europe	
MGV 8255	Woody Herman	Woody Herman '58	
MGV 8256	Louis Bellson	Louis Bellson at The Flamingo	
MGV 8257	Billie Holiday	Songs for Distingué Lovers	
MGV 8258	Louis Bellson	Let's Call It Swing	
MGV 8259	Anita O'Day	Anita Sings the Most	
MGV 8260	Dizzy Gillespie	Duets	
MGV 8261	Coleman Hawkins	The Genius of Coleman Hawkins	
MGV 8262	Dizzy Gillespie, Sonny Stitt and Sonny Rollins	Sonny Side Up	
MGV 8263	Stan Getz and Chet Baker	Stan Meets Chet	
MGV 8264	Ella Fitzgerald	Ella at the Opera House	
MGV 8265	Stan Getz and J. J. Johnson	Stan Getz and J.J. Johnson at the Opera House	(mono)
MGV 8266	Coleman Hawkins and Roy Eldridge	Coleman Hawkins and Roy Eldridge at the Opera House	(mono)
MGV 8267	Various Artists	The JatP All Stars at the Opera House	
MGV 8268	Oscar Peterson	Oscar Peterson at the Concertgebouw	
MGV 8269	Modern Jazz Quartet / Oscar Peterson Trio	The Modern Jazz Quartet and the Oscar Peterson Trio at the Opera House	
MGV 8270	Stephane Grappelli and Stuff Smith	Stuff and Steph	Unissued - Released on Barclay Records
MGV 8271	Johnny Hodges and the Ellington Men	The Big Sound	
MGV 8272	Teddy Wilson	The Impeccable Mr. Wilson	
MGV 8273	Toshiko Akiyoshi	The Many Sides of Toshiko	
MGV 8274	Ben Webster	Soulville	
MGV 8275	Lionel Hampton	(not released)	
MGV 8276	Gene Krupa	Krupa Rocks	
MGV 8277	George Lewis	The Perennial George Lewis	
MGV 8278	Herb Ellis	(not released)	
MGV 8279	Buddy DeFranco	Buddy DeFranco	(not released)
MGV 8280	Louis Bellson and His Orchestra	Music, Romance and Especially Love	
MGV 8281	Lee Konitz	Tranquility	
MGV 8282	Stuff Smith	Have Violin, Will Swing	
MGV 8283	Anita O'Day	Anita Sings the Winners	
MGV 8284	Various Artists	The JatP All Stars at the Opera House	(not released)
MGV 8285	Buddy Rich	Buddy Rich in Miami	
MGV 8286	Lee Konitz	An Image: Lee Konitz with Strings	Orchestra arranged and conducted by William Russo
MGV 8287	Oscar Peterson	On the Town with the Oscar Peterson Trio	
MGV 8288	Count Basie, Ella Fitzgerald and Joe Williams	One O'Clock Jump	
MGV 8289	Tal Farlow	This Is Tal Farlow	
MGV 8290	Ray Brown	This Is Ray Brown	
MGV 8291	Count Basie	Hall of Fame	
MGV 8292	Gene Krupa	Gene Krupa Plays Gerry Mulligan Arrangements	
MGV 8293	Harry Edison and Buck Clayton	Harry Edison Swings Buck Clayton	
MGV 8294	Stan Getz	The Steamer	
MGV 8295	Harry Edison	The Swinger	
MGV 8296	Stan Getz	Award Winner: Stan Getz	
MGV 8297	Bobby Scott	Serenata	
MGV 8298	Lester Young and Harry Edison	Going for Myself	
MGV 8299	Teddy Wilson	These Tunes Remind Me of You	
MGV 8300	Gene Krupa	Hey! Here's Gene Krupa	
MGV 8301	Bud Powell	The Lonely One...	
MGV 8302	Billie Holiday	Stay with Me	
MGV 8303	George Lewis	On Stage: George Lewis Concert Vol. 1	
MGV 8304	George Lewis	On Stage: George Lewis Concert Vol. 2	
MGV 8305	Howard Roberts	Good Pickin's	
MGV 8306	Sonny Stitt	The Hard Swing	
MGV 8307	Jimmy Giuffre 3	7 Pieces	
MGV 8308	Lester Young	The Lester Young Story	
MGV 8309	Sonny Stitt	Sonny Stitt Plays Jimmy Giuffre Arrangements	
MGV 8310	Gene Krupa	Gene Krupa at the London House: Big Noise from Winnetka	
MGV 8311	Herb Ellis and Jimmy Giuffre	Herb Ellis Meets Jimmy Giuffre	
MGV 8312	Anita O'Day	Cool Heat	
MGV 8313	Dizzy Gillespie	Have Trumpet, Will Excite!	
MGV 8314	Johnny Hodges	Johnny Hodges and His Strings Play the Prettiest Gershwin	
MGV 8315	Buddy DeFranco and His Music	Bravura	
MGV 8316	Lester Young, Roy Eldridge and Harry Edison	Laughin' to Keep from Cryin'	
MGV 8317	Duke Ellington and Johnny Hodges	Back to Back: Duke Ellington and Johnny Hodges Play the Blues	
MGV 8318	Ben Webster	Ben Webster and Associates	
MGV 8319	Junior Mance	Junior	
MGV 8320	Various Artists	Down Beat's Hall of Fame Vol. 1	
MGV 8321	Stan Getz	The Soft Swing	
MGV 8322	Louis Armstrong and Oscar Petereson	Louis Armstrong Meets Oscar Peterson	
MGV 8323	Art Tatum	The Greatest Piano of Them All	
MGV 8324	Sonny Stitt	Personal Appearance	
MGV 8325	George Lewis	Oh, Didn't He Ramble	
MGV 8326	Bobby Scott	Bobby Scott Plays the Music of Leonard Bernstein	
MGV 8327	Coleman Hawkins and Ben Webster	Coleman Hawkins Encounters Ben Webster	
MGV 8328	Dizzy Gillespie	The Ebullient Mr. Gillespie	
MGV 8329	Billie Holiday	All Or Nothing at All	
MGV 8330	Teddy Wilson	The Touch of Teddy Wilson	
MGV 8331	Stan Getz	Imported from Europe	
MGV 8332	Art Tatum	The Incomparable Art Tatum	
MGV 8333	Lyle Ritz and His Jazz Ukulele	50th State Jazz	
MGV 8334	Oscar Peterson	A Jazz Portrait of Frank Sinatra	
MGV 8335	Lee Konitz and Jimmy Giuffre	Lee Konitz Meets Jimmy Giuffre	
MGV 8336	Herbie Mann	Flautista!	
MGV 8337	Jimmy Giuffre	The Easy Way	
MGV 8338	Billie Holiday	The Unforgettable Lady Day	
MGV 8339	Stuff Smith	Cat on a Hot Fiddle	
MGV 8340	Oscar Peterson	Oscar Peterson Plays Porgy & Bess	
MGV 8341	Various Artists	Special College Jazz Album	complimentary record
MGV 8342	Jorge Sevilla	The Incredible Guitar of Jorge Sevilla	
MGV 8343	Gerry Mulligan and Ben Webster	Gerry Mulligan Meets Ben Webster	
MGV 8344	Sonny Stitt and the Oscar Peterson Trio	Sonny Stitt Sits in with the Oscar Peterson Trio	
MGV 8345	Duke Ellington and Johnny Hodges	Side By Side	
MGV 8346	Coleman Hawkins	Coleman Hawkins and Confrères	
MGV 8347	Art Tatum	More of the Greatest Piano of Them All	
MGV 8348	Stan Getz	Stan Getz and Gerry Mulligan / Stan Getz and The Oscar Peterson Trio	
MGV 8349	Ben Webster and Oscar Peterson	Ben Webster Meets Oscar Peterson	
MGV 8350	Johnny Hodges	A Smooth One	(not released)
MGV 8351	Oscar Peterson	The Jazz Soul of Oscar Peterson	
MGV 8352	Dizzy Gillespie	The Greatest Trumpet of Them All	
MGV 8353	Harry Edison	Mr. Swing	
MGV 8354	Louis Bellson	Drummer's Holiday	
MGV 8355	Johnny Hodges	Not So Dukish	
MGV 8356	Stan Getz	Stan Getz Quintet	(not released)
MGV 8357	Dizzy Gillespie	Dizzy Gillespie Big Band	(not released)
MGV 8358	Johnny Hodges	Blues-a-Plenty	
MGV 8359	Ben Webster	The Soul of Ben Webster	
MGV 8360	Art Tatum	Still More of the Greatest Piano of Them All	
MGV 8361	The Jimmy Giuffre 4	Ad Lib	
MGV 8362	Lee Konitz	You and Lee	
MGV 8363	Buddy DeFranco	Generalissimo	
MGV 8364	Oscar Peterson	Swinging Brass with the Oscar Peterson Trio	
MGV 8365	Pete Brown	From the Heart	
MGV 8366	Oscar Peterson	Fiorello!	
MGV 8367	Gerry Mulligan and Johnny Hodges	Gerry Mulligan Meets Johnny Hodges	
MGV 8368	Oscar Peterson	The Oscar Peterson Trio at the JatP	
MGV 8369	Gene Krupa and Buddy Rich	The Drum Battle	
MGV 8370	Tal Farlow	The Guitar Artistry of Tal Farlow	
MGV 8371	Tal Farlow	Tal Farlow Plays the Music of Harold Arlen	
MGV 8372	Katie Bell Nubin	Soul, Soul Searching	(not released)
MGV 8373	Gene Krupa	(not released)	
MGV 8374	Sonny Stitt	Sonny Stitt Blows the Blues	
MGV 8375	Buddy DeFranco	Wholly Cats	
MGV 8376	Phil Nimmons	Nimmons' n' Nine	
MGV 8377	Sonny Stitt	Saxophone Supremacy	
MGV 8378	Lester Young	Lester Young in Paris	
MGV 8379	Stan Getz and Strings	Cool Velvet	
MGV 8380	Sonny Stitt	Sonny Stitt Swings the Most	
MGV 8381	Herb Ellis	Thank You, Charlie Christian	
MGV 8382	Buddy DeFranco	Closed Session	
MGV 8383	Buddy DeFranco and His Septette	Live Date!	
MGV 8384	Buddy DeFranco	(not released)	
MGV 8385	Bob Brookmeyer	The Blues Hot and Cold	
MGV 8386	Dizzy Gillespie	A Portrait of Duke Ellington	
MGV 8387	Jimmy Giuffre Quartet	The Jimmy Giuffre Quartet in Person	
MGV 8388	Gerry Mulligan	The Concert Jazz Band	
MGV 8389	Roy Eldridge	Swingin' on the Town	
MGV 8390	Ray Brown	Jazz Cello	
MGV 8391	Johnny Hodges	Johnny Hodges	(not released)
MGV 8392	Herbie Mann Nonet	Flute, Brass, Vibes and Percussion	
MGV 8393	Stan Getz	Stan Getz at Large	
MGV 8394	Dizzy Gillespie	Gillespiana	
MGV 8395	Jimmy Giuffre	Piece for Clarinet and String Orchestra/Mobiles	
MGV 8396	Gerry Mulligan	Gerry Mulligan and the Concert Jazz Band at the Village Vanguard	
MGV 8397	Jimmy Giuffre 3	Fusion	
MGV 8398	Lester Young	The Essential Lester Young	
V/V6 8399	Lee Konitz	Motion	
MGV 8400	Gene Krupa and Buddy Rich	Krupa and Rich	
MGV 8401	Dizzy Gillespie	An Electrifying Evening with the Dizzy Gillespie Quintet	
V/V6 8402	Jimmy Giuffre	Thesis	
MGV 8403	Sonny Stitt	Unissued - released as V6S 8837 in 1973	
MGV 8404	Sonny Stitt	Unissued - released as V/V6 8451	
MGV 8405	Stan Getz and J. J. Johnson	(not released)	
V/V6 8406	Johnny Hodges	Blue Hodge	
V/V6 8407	Count Basie	The Essential Count Basie	
V/V6 8408	Various Artists	Collectors' Choice	(not released)
V/V6 8409	Charlie Parker	The Essential Charlie Parker	
V/V6 8410	Billie Holiday	The Essential Billie Holiday	
V/V6 8411	Dizzy Gillespie	Perceptions	
V/V6 8412	Stan Getz	Focus	
V/V6 8413	Bob Brookmeyer	7 x Wilder	
V/V6 8414	Gene Krupa	Percussion King	
V/V6 8415	Gerry Mulligan	Gerry Mulligan Presents a Concert in Jazz	
V/V6 8416	Jack Teagarden	Mis'ry and the Blues	
V/V6 8418	Stan Getz and Bob Brookmeyer	Recorded Fall 1961	
V/V6 8419	Cal Tjader	In a Latin Bag	
V/V6 8420	Oscar Peterson	The Trio: Live from Chicago	
V/V6 8423	Dizzy Gillespie	Carnegie Hall Concert	
V/V6 8424	Jacy Parker	Spotlight On Jacy Parker	
V/V6 8425	Buddy Rich	Blues Caravan	
V/V6 8426	Gene Ammons and Sonny Stitt	Boss Tenors	
V/V6 8427	Kai Winding	Kai Olé	
V/V6 8428	Yves Montand	On Broadway... The Best of Yves Montand!	
V/V6 8429	Oscar Peterson Trio with Milt Jackson	Very Tall	
V/V6 8430	Sonny Rollins	Brass & Trio	
V/V6 8432	Stan Getz and Charlie Byrd	Jazz Samba	
V/V6 8433	Art Tatum	The Essential Art Tatum	
V/V6 8434	Frances Faye	Swinging All the Way with Frances Faye	
V/V6 8438	Gerry Mulligan	Gerry Mulligan and the Concert Jazz Band on Tour	
V/V6 8439	Sister Rosetta Tharpe	The Gospel Truth	
V/V6 8440	Mel Tormé	My Kind of Music	
V/V6 8441	Eddie Condon, Bud Freeman, Bob Haggart, Gene Krupa, Jimmy McPartland, Pee Wee Russell, Joe Sullivan, Jack Teagarden	Chicago and All That Jazz!	Selections from the program in the NBC Special Projects Television Series, "America's Music"
V/V6 8442	Anita O'Day	All the Sad Young Men	
V/V6 8443	Gary McFarland	The Jazz Version of "How to Succeed in Business without Really Trying"	
V/V6 8444	Ray Brown	Ray Brown with the All-Star Big Band	Guest Soloist: Cannonball Adderley
V/V6 8446	Mary Kaye Trio	For the Record	
V/V6 8447	Terry Gibbs	That Swing Thing!	
V/V6 8448	Herb Ellis	Softly... But with That Feeling	
V/V6 8450	Gene Krupa	Classics in Percussion	
V/V6 8451	Sonny Stitt with the Ralph Burns Strings	The Sensual Sound of Sonny Stitt	
V/V6 8452	Johnny Hodges and Billy Strayhorn	Johnny Hodges with Billy Strayhorn and the Orchestra	
V 8453	Lightnin' Hopkins	Fast Life Woman	Reissue of Dart 8000
V/V6 8454	Oscar Peterson Trio	West Side Story	
V/V6 8455	Bob Brookmeyer	Gloomy Sunday and Other Bright Moments	
V/V6 8456	Kid Ory	The Kid Ory Story: Storyville Nights	
V/V6 8459	Cal Tjader	Saturday Night, Sunday Night at the Blackhawk	
V/V6 8465	Jack Teagarden	Think Well of Me	
V/V6 8466	Gerry Mulligan Quartet	The Gerry Mulligan Quartet	
V 8467	Dalida	I Feel So Alive	
V/V6 8468	Gene Ammons and Sonny Stitt	Boss Tenors in Orbit!	
V/V6 8469	Don Randi	Where Do We Go from Here?	
V/V6 8470	Cal Tjader	Cal Tjader Plays the Contemporary Music of Mexico and Brazil	
V/V6 8471	Buddy Rich and Gene Krupa	Burnin' Beat	
V/V6 8472	Anita O'Day and Cal Tjader	Time for 2	
V/V6 8474	Jimmy Smith	Bashin': The Unpredictable Jimmy Smith	
V/V6 8475	Don Goldie	Trumpet Exodus	
V/V6 8476	Oscar Peterson Trio	Bursting Out with the All-Star Big Band!	
V/V6 8477	Dizzy Gillespie, Sonny Rollins and Sonny Stitt	Dizzy, Rollins and Stitt	Selections from Duets and Sonny Side Up
V/V6 8478	Gerry Mulligan and Paul Desmond	Blues in Time	Reissue of MGV 8246
V/V6 8480	Oscar Peterson Trio	The Sound of the Trio	
V/V6 8482	Modern Jazz Quartet and Oscar Peterson	The Modern Jazz Quartet and the Oscar Peterson Trio at the Opera House	Reissue of MGV 8269
V/V6 8483	Anita O'Day	This Is Anita	Reissue of MGV 2000
V/V6 8484	Gene Krupa and Buddy Rich	The Original Drum Battle	Reissue of MGV 8369
V/V6 8485	Anita O'Day	Anita O'Day Sings the Winners	Reissue of MGV 8283
V/V6 8486	Various Artists	Funky Blues	
V/V6 8488	Count Basie and Joe Williams	Count Basie Swings, Joe Williams Sings	Reissue of MGV 8063
V/V6 8489	Various Artists	The JatP All Stars at the Opera House	Reissue of MGV 8267
V/V6 8490	Stan Getz and J. J. Johnson	Stan Getz and J.J. Johnson at the Opera House	Reissue of MGV 8265
V/V6 8491	Mel Tormé	I Dig the Duke! I Dig the Count!	
V/V6 8492	Johnny Hodges	The Eleventh Hour	
V/V6 8493	Kai Winding	Suspense Themes in Jazz	
V/V6 8494	Stan Getz and Gary McFarland	Big Band Bossa Nova	
V/V6 8495	Jack Teagarden	Jack Teagarden!!	
V/V6 8496	Terry Gibbs Quartet	Straight Ahead	
V/V6 8497	Bill Evans and Shelly Manne	Empathy	
V/V6 8498	Bob Brookmeyer	Trombone Jazz Samba	
V/V6 8504	Coleman Hawkins, Roy Eldridge and Johnny Hodges	Hawkins! Eldridge! Hodges! Alive! At the Village Gate!	
V/V6 8505	Various Artists	The Essential Jazz Vocals	
V/V6 8507	Cal Tjader	Several Shades of Jade	
V/V6 8508	Oliver Nelson	Full Nelson	
V/V6 8509	Coleman Hawkins	Hawkins! Alive! At the Village Gate	
V/V6 8511	Count Basie	On My Way & Shoutin' Again!	
V/V6 8513	The Three Sounds	Blue Genes	
V/V6 8514	Anita O'Day and the Three Sounds	Anita O'Day & the Three Sounds	
V/V6 8515	Gerry Mulligan	Gerry Mulligan '63	
V/V6 8516	Oscar Peterson	Affinity	
V/V6 8518	Gary McFarland	The Gary McFarland Orchestra	
V/V6 8519	Steve Addiss and Bill Crofut		
V/V6 8522	Luiz Bonfá	Luiz Bonfa Plays and Sings Bossa Nova	
V/V6 8523	Stan Getz and Luiz Bonfá	Jazz Samba Encore!	
V/V6 8524	Don Randi	Last Night with the Don Randi Trio	
V/V6 8525	Kai Winding	Solo	
V/V6 8526	Bill Evans	Conversations with Myself	
V/V6 8527	Herbie Mann	Sound of Mann	Selections from MGV 8247, MGV 8336 and MGV 8392
V/V6 8530	J. J. Johnson	J.J.'s Broadway	
V/V6 8531	Cal Tjader	Soña Libré	
V/V6 8534	Gerry Mulligan and Ben Webster	Gerry Mulligan Meets Ben Webster	Reissue of MGV 8343
V/V6 8535	Gerry Mulligan and Stan Getz	Gerry Mulligan Meets Stan Getz	Reissue of MGV 8249
V/V6 8536	Gerry Mulligan and Johnny Hodges	Gerry Mulligan Meets Johnny Hodges	Reissue of MGV 8367
V/V6 8538	Oscar Peterson	Night Train	
V/V6 8539	Various Artists	Norman Granz Presents Jazz at the Philharmonic in Europe Vol. 1	
V/V6 8540	Various Artists	Norman Granz Presents Jazz at the Philharmonic in Europe Vol. 2	
V/V6 8541	Various Artists	Norman Granz Presents Jazz at the Philharmonic in Europe Vol. 3	
V/V6 8542	Various Artists	Norman Granz Presents Jazz at the Philharmonic in Europe Vol. 4	
V/V6 8543	Lalo Schifrin and Bob Brookmeyer	Samba Para Dos	
V/V6 8544	Jimmy Smith	Hobo Flats	
V/V6 8545	Stan Getz and João Gilberto	Getz/Gilberto	
V/V6 8546	Johnny Hodges	(not released)	
V/V6 8547	Antônio Carlos Jobim	The Composer of "Desafinado", Plays	
V/V6 8548	Kenyon Hopkins	The Yellow Canary	
V/V6 8549	Count Basie	Li'l Ol' Groovemaker...Basie!	
V/V6 8551	Kai Winding	Soul Surfin'	also released as !!!More!!! (Theme from Mondo Cane)
V/V6 8552	Jimmy Smith	Any Number Can Win	
V/V6 8553	Kenny Burrell and Jimmy Smith	Blue Bash!	
V/V6 8554	Stan Getz	Reflections	
V/V6 8555	Gil Evans	The Individualism of Gil Evans	
V/V6 8556	Kai Winding	Kai Winding	
V/V6 8558	Woody Herman	Hey! Heard the Herd?	
V/V6 8559	Oscar Peterson / Gerry Mulligan	Oscar Peterson / Gerry Mulligan at Newport	
V/V6 8560	Count Basie/Dizzy Gillespie	The Count Basie Band and Dizzy Gillespie Band at Newport	
V/V6 8561	Johnny Hodges	Sandy's Gone	
V/V6 8562	Oscar Peterson and Nelson Riddle	Oscar Peterson and Nelson Riddle	
V/V6 8563	Count Basie	More Hits of the 50's and 60's	
V/V6 8564	Spike Jones	35 Reasons Why Christmas Can Be Fun	
V/V6 8565	André Previn	The Essential André Previn	
V/V6 8566	Dizzy Gillespie	The Essential Dizzy Gillespie	
V/V6 8567	Gerry Mulligan	The Essential Gerry Mulligan	
V/V6 8568	Coleman Hawkins	The Essential Coleman Hawkins	
V/V6 8569	Louis Armstrong	The Essential Louis Armstrong	
V/V6 8570	Johnny Hodges and Wild Bill Davis	Mess of Blues	
V/V6 8571	Gene Krupa	The Essential Gene Krupa	
V/V6 8572	Anita O'Day	Incomparable!	
V/V6 8573	Kai Winding	Mondo Cane #2	
V/V6 8574	Vinny Bell	Whistle Stop	
V/V6 8575	Cal Tjader	Breeze from the East	
V/V6 8576	Wynton Kelly	Comin' in the Back Door	
V/V6 8578	Bill Evans	Trio '64	
V/V6 8579	Various Artists	Winners All! Down Beat Jazz Poll	
V/V6 8580	Ray Brown and Milt Jackson	Much in Common	
V/V6 8581	Oscar Peterson	Oscar Peterson Plays "My Fair Lady"	
V/V6 8582	Benny Goodman	The Essential Benny Goodman	
V/V6 8583	Jimmy Smith	Who's Afraid of Virginia Woolf?	
V/V6 8584	Gene Krupa	The Great New Gene Krupa Quartet Featuring Charlie Ventura	
V/V6 8585	Cal Tjader	Warm Wave	
V/V6 8587	Jimmy Smith	The Cat	
V/V6 8588	Wynton Kelly	It's All Right!	
V/V6 8589	Willis Jackson	'Gator Tails	
V/V6 8591	Oscar Peterson	The Oscar Peterson Trio Plays	
V/V6 8593	Mel Tormé	The Best of Mel Tormé - Verve's Choice	
V/V6 8594	Gene Krupa	The Best of Gene Krupa - Verve's Choice	
V/V6 8595	Louis Armstrong	The Best of Louis Armstrong - Verve's Choice	
V/V6 8596	Count Basie	The Best of Count Basie - Verve's Choice	
V/V6 8597	Count Basie	Basie Land	
V/V6 8599	Johnny Hodges and Wild Bill Davis	Blue Rabbit	
V/V6 8600	Stan Getz Quartet featuring Astrud Gilberto	Getz Au Go Go	
V/V6 8601	Lalo Schifrin	New Fantasy	
V/V6 8602	Kai Winding	Modern Country	
V/V6 8603	Gary McFarland	Soft Samba	
V/V6 8604	Jimmy Smith	Christmas '64	
V/V6 8605	Sammy Davis Jr. with the Count Basie Orchestra	Our Shining Hour	
V/V6 8606	Oscar Peterson Trio	We Get Requests	
V/V6 8608	Astrud Gilberto	The Astrud Gilberto Album	
V/V6 8609	Donald Byrd	Up with Donald Byrd	
V/V6 8610	Wes Montgomery	Movin' Wes	
V/V6 8612	Kenny Burrell with Gil Evans	Guitar Forms	
V/V6 8613	Bill Evans	Trio '65	
V/V6 8614	Cal Tjader	Soul Sauce	
V/V6 8615	Ray Brown and Milt Jackson	Ray Brown / Milt Jackson	
V/V6 8616	Count Basie	Basie Picks the Winners	
V/V6 8617	Johnny Hodges and Wild Bill Davis	Joe's Blues	
V/V6 8618	Jimmy Smith	Monster	
V/V6 8619	Bill Henderson	When My Dreamboat Comes Home	
V/V6 8620	Kai Winding	Rainy Day	
V/V6 8621	Irene Reid	Room for One More	
V/V6 8622	Wynton Kelly	Undiluted	
V/V6 8623	Stan Getz and João Gilberto	Getz/Gilberto Vol. 2	
V/V6 8624	Lalo Schifrin	Once a Thief and Other Themes	
V/V6 8625	Wes Montgomery	Bumpin'	
V/V6 8626	Cal Tjader	Soul Bird: Whiffenpoof	
V/V6 8627	Grant Green	His Majesty King Funk	
V/V6 8628	Jimmy Smith	Organ Grinder Swing	
V/V6 8629	Astrud Gilberto	The Shadow of Your Smile	
V/V6 8630	Johnny Hodges and Wild Bill Davis	Wings & Things	
V/V6 8631	Willie Bobo	Spanish Grease	
V/V6 8632	Gary McFarland	The "In" Sound	
V/V6 8633	Wynton Kelly Trio with Wes Montgomery	Smokin' at the Half Note	
V/V6 8634	Tony Scott	Music for Zen Meditation	
V/V6 8635	Johnny Hodges and Wild Bill Davis	Blue Pyramid	
V/V6 8636	Susan Rafey	Hurt So Bad	
V/V6 8637	Cal Tjader	Soul Burst	
V/V6 8638	Kenyon Hopkins	Mr. Buddwing (Soundtrack)	
V/V6 8639	Kai Winding	The In Instrumentals	
V/V6 8640	Bill Evans	Bill Evans Trio with Symphony Orchestra	
V/V6 8641	Jimmy Smith	Got My Mojo Working	
V/V6 8642	Wes Montgomery	Goin' Out of My Head	
V/V6 8643	Astrud Gilberto with the Gil Evan Orchestra	Look to the Rainbow	
V/V6 8646	Arthur Prysock and Count Basie	Arthur Prysock and Count Basie	
V/V6 8647	Johnny Hodges and Earl “Fatha” Hines	Stride Right	
V/V6 8648	Willie Bobo	Uno Dos Tres 1•2•3	
V/V6 8650	Brooks Arthur	Sole Forms	
V/V6 8651	Cal Tjader and Eddie Palmieri	El Sonido Nuevo	
V/V6 8652	Jimmy Smith	Peter & the Wolf	
V/V6 8653	Wes Montgomery	Tequila	
V/V6 8654	Lalo Schifrin	The Dissection and Reconstruction of Music From the Past as Performed By the Inmates of Lalo Schifrin's Demented Ensemble as a Tribute to the Memory of the Marquis De Sade	
V/V6 8655	Bill Evans and Jim Hall	Intermodulation	
V/V6 8656	Kenny Burrell	A Generation Ago Today	
V/V6 8657	Kai Winding	More Brass	
V/V6 8658	Walter Wanderley	Rain Forest	
V/V6 8659	Count Basie	Basie's Beatle Bag	
V/V6 8660	Oscar Peterson	Put On a Happy Face	
V/V6 8661	Kai Winding	Dirty Dog	
V/V6 8662	Howard Roberts	Velvet Groove	
V/V6 8663	Ed Thigpen	Out of the Storm	
V/V6 8664	Kenyon Hopkins	This Property Is Condemned (Soundtrack)	
V/V6 8665	Stan Getz and Laurindo Almeida	Stan Getz With Guest Artist Laurindo Almeida	
V/V6 8666	Jimmy Smith	Christmas Cookin'	Reissue of V/V6 8604
V/V6 8667	Jimmy Smith	Hoochie Coochie Man	
V/V6 8668	Jackie and Roy	Changes	
V/V6 8669	Willie Bobo	Feelin' So Good	
V/V6 8670	Ella Fitzgerald	Ella Fitzgerald Sings the Jerome Kern Songbook	
V/V6 8671	Cal Tjader	Along Comes Cal	
V/V6 8672	Wes Montgomery	California Dreaming	
V/V6 8673	Astrud Gilberto and Walter Wanderley	A Certain Smile, a Certain Sadness	
V/V6 8674	Gary McFarland	(not released)	
V/V6 8675	Bill Evans	A Simple Matter of Conviction	
V/V6 8676	Walter Wanderley	Cheganca	
V/V6 8677	Various Artists	Leonard Feather's Encyclopedia of Jazz	Featuring Oliver Nelson's Orchestra, Jimmy Smith & Wes Montgomery, Count Basie and Johnny Hodges & Earl Hines
V/V6 8678	Jimmy Smith and Wes Montgomery	Jimmy & Wes: The Dynamic Duo	
V/V6 8679	Quincy Jones	The Deadly Affair (Soundtrack)	
V/V6 8680	Johnny Hodges	Blue Notes	
V/V6 8681	Oscar Peterson	Something Warm	
V/V6 8682	Gary McFarland	Soft Samba	
V/V6 8683	Bill Evans	Bill Evans at Town Hall	
V/V6 8684	Curtis Amy	Mustang	
V/V6 8685	Willie Bobo	Juicy	
V/V6 8687	Count Basie	Basie's Beat	
V/V6 8688	Jackie and Roy	Lovesick	
V/V6 8689	Bola Sete	Bola Sete at the Monterey Jazz Festival	
V/V6 8691	Kai Winding	Penny Lane & Time	
V/V6 8692	Johnny Smith	Johnny Smith	
V/V6 8693	Stan Getz	Sweet Rain	
V/V6 8694	Kenyon Hopkins	Dream Songs	
V/V6 8697	Luiz Henrique	Barra Limpa	
V/V6 8698	Bobby Hackett	Creole Cookin'	
V/V6 8699	Willie Bobo	Bobo Motion	
V/V6 8700	Oscar Peterson	Thoroughly Modern 20's	
V/V6 8701	Duke Ellington	Soul Call	
V/V6 8702	Don Costa	Modern Delights	
V/V6 8705	Jimmy Smith	Respect	
V/V6 8706	Walter Wanderley	Batucada	
V/V6 8707	Stan Getz	Voices	
V/V6 8708	Astrud Gilberto	Beach Samba	
V/V6 8709	Roland Kirk	Now Please Don't You Cry, Beautiful Edith	
V/V6 8710	Benny Golson	Tune In, Turn On	
V/V6 8711	Alan Lorber	The Lotus Palace	
V/V6 8712	Buddy Rich and His Orchestra	Big Band Shout	Reissue of Norgran MGN 1086
V/V6 8713	Paul Mitchell	Paul Mitchell Trio Live at the Atlanta Playboy Club	
V/V6 8714	Wes Montgomery	The Best of Wes Montgomery	
V/V6 8719	Stan Getz	The Best of Stan Getz	
V/V6 8720	Ella Fitzgerald	The Best of Ella Fitzgerald	
V/V6 8721	Jimmy Smith	The Best of Jimmy Smith	
V/V6 8722	Little Richie Varola	Little Ritchie Varola	
V/V6 8723	Bobby Hackett and Billy Butterfield	Bobby/Billy/Brazil	
V/V6 8725	Cal Tjader	The Best of Cal Tjader	
V/V6 8726	Johnny Hodges	Don't Sleep in the Subway	
V/V6 8727	Bill Evans	Further Conversations with Myself	
V/V6 8729	Jerome Richardson	Groove Merchant	
V/V6 8730	Cal Tjader	Hip Vibrations	
V/V6 8731	Jazz Interactions Orchestra	Jazzhattan Suite	
V/V6 8732	Johnny Hodges and Earl Hines	Swing's Our Thing	
V/V6 8734	Luiz Henrique and Walter Wanderley	Popcorn	
V/V6 8736	Willie Bobo	Spanish Blues Band	
V/V6 8737	Johnny Smith	Johnny Smith's Kaleidoscope	
V/V6 8738	Gary McFarland	Scorpio and Other Signs	
V/V6 8739	Walter Wanderley	Kee-Ka-Roo	
V/V6 8740	Oscar Peterson	Night Train Vol. 2	
V/V6 8741	Frank Zappa	Lumpy Gravy	
V/V6 8742	Tony Scott	Music for Yoga Meditation and Other Joys	
V/V6 8743	Oliver Nelson	Leonard Feather Presents the Sound of Feeling and the Sound of Oliver Nelson	
V/V6 8744	Gil Mellé	Tome VI	
V/V6 8745	Jimmy Smith	Stay Loose	
V/V6 8746	Kenny Burrell	Blues - The Common Ground	
V/V6 8747	Bill Evans	The Best of Bill Evans	
V/V6 8748	Ella Fitzgerald	Ella Live	
V/V6 8749	George Benson	Giblet Gravy	
V/V6 8750	Jimmy Smith	Livin' It Up	
V/V6 8751	Kenny Burrell	Night Song	
V/V6 8752	Stan Getz	What the World Needs Now: Stan Getz Plays Burt Bacharach and Hal David	
V6 8753	Johnny Hodges	Rippin' & Runnin'	
V6 8754	Astrud Gilberto	Windy	
V6 8756	Don Sebesky	Don Sebesky & the Jazz-Rock Syndrome	
V6 8757	Wes Montgomery	The Best of Wes Montgomery Vol. 2	
V6 8759	Marvin Stamm	Machinations	
V6 8760	Michel Legrand	Michel Legrand at Shelly Manne's Hole	
V6 8761	Milt Jackson	Milt Jackson and the Hip String Quartet	
V6 8762	Bill Evans	Bill Evans at the Montreux Jazz Festival	
V6 8764	Woody Herman	Concerto for Herd	
V6 8765	Wes Montgomery	Willow Weep for Me	
V6 8766	Jimmy Smith and Wes Montgomery	Further Adventures of Jimmy and Wes	
V6 8767	Johnny Smith	Phase, II	
V6 8768	Alan Shorter	Orgasm	
V6 8769	Cal Tjader	The Prophet	
V6 8770	Jimmy Smith	The Boss	
V6 8771	George Benson	Goodies	
V6 8772	Willie Bobo	A New Dimension	
V6 8773	Kenny Burrell	Asphalt Canyon Suite	
V6 8775	Oscar Peterson	Oscar's	
V6 8776	Astrud Gilberto	I Haven't Got Anything Better to Do	
V6 8777	Bill Evans and Jeremy Steig	What's New?	
V6 8778	Buddy Rich	Super Rich	
V6 8779	Brooks Arthur	Traces	
V6 8780	Stan Getz	Didn't We	
V6 8781	Willie Bobo	Evil Ways	Selections from V/V6 8631, V/V6 8669, V/V6 8685 & V/V6 8736
V6 8782	Willis Jackson	Willis Jackson	Reissue of V/V6 8589
V6 8783	Count Basie and His Orchestra	Basie	Compilation of tracks from V6 8012, V6 8511, V6 8549, V6 8563, V6 8616, V6 8659 & V6 8687
V6 8784	Herbie Mann	(not released)	
V6 8785	Lalo Schifrin	Insensatez	
V6 8786	Gary McFarland	Sympathetic Vibrations	
V6 8787	Charlie Parker	The Bird Set	
V6 8788	Tony Scott	Homage to Lord Krishna	
V6 8790	Monty Alexander	This Is Monty Alexander	
V6 8791	Phil Woods	Round Trip	
V6 8792	Bill Evans	Bill Evans Alone	
V6 8793	Astrud Gilberto	September 17, 1969	
V6 8794	Jimmy Smith	Groove Drops	
V6 8795	Ella Fitzgerald	Ella Fitzgerald	
V6 8796	Wes Montgomery	Eulogy	
V6 8797	Phil Woods	Phil Woods and His European Rhythm Machine at the Montreux Jazz Festival	
V6 8798	Chet Baker	Blood, Chet and Tears	
V6 8799	Dakota Staton	I've Been There	
V6 8800	Jimmy Smith	In a Plain Brown Wrapper	
V6 8801	Lalo Schifrin	Rock Requiem	
V6 8802	Stan Getz	Dynasty	
V6 8803	Bill Evans	The Bill Evans Trio "Live"	
V6 8804	Wes Montgomery	Just Walkin'	
V6 8806	Jimmy Smith	Root Down	
V6 8807	Stan Getz	Communications '72	
V6 8808	Billie Holiday	The Best of Billie Holiday	
V6 8809	Jimmy Smith	Bluesmith	
2V6S 8810	Oscar Peterson	The Oscar Peterson Collection	2LP Compilation
2V6S 8811	Ella Fitzgerald and Louis Armstrong	Ella and Louis	2LP Compilation
2V6S 8812	Gene Ammons and Sonny Stitt	Prime Cuts	2LP Compilation of V/V6 8426 & V/V6 8468
2V6S 8813	Wes Montgomery	The History of Wes Montgomery	2LP Compilation
2V6S 8814	Jimmy Smith	The History of Jimmy Smith	2LP Compilation
2V6S 8815	Stan Getz	The History of Stan Getz	2LP Compilation
2V6S 8816	Billie Holiday	The History of Billie Holiday	2LP Compilation
2V6S 8817	Ella Fitzgerald	The History of Ella Fitzgerald	2LP Compilation
2V6S 8818	Various Artists	We Love You Madly: A Tribute to Duke Ellington	2LP Compilation
V6 8819	La Clave	La Clave	
2V6S 8820	Cal Tjader	Doxy	2LP Compilation
2V6S 8821	Herbie Mann	Et Tu Flute	2LP - Selections from MGV 8247, MGV 8336 and MGV 8392
2V6S 8822	Duke Ellington and Johnny Hodges	Blues Summit	2LP Compilation of MGV 8317 & MGV 8345
2V6S 8823	Various Artists	Jazz at the Philharmonic in Europe	2LP Compilation of V/V6 8539 & V/V6 8542
2V6S 8824	Buddy Rich	The Monster	2LP Compilation
V6S 8825	The Mill Valley Bunch	Casting Pearls	
V6S 8826	Ella Fitzgerald / Billie Holiday	The Newport Years Volume I	Reissue of MGV 8234
V6S 8827	Teddy Wilson Trio and the Gerry Mulligan Quartet	The Newport Years Volume II	Reissue of MGV 8235
V6S 8828	Oscar Peterson Trio with Roy Eldridge / Sonny Stitt & Jo Jones	The Newport Years Volume III	Reissue of MGV 8239
V6S 8829	The Coleman Hawkins, Roy Eldridge, Pete Brown, Jo Jones All-Stars	The Newport Years Volume IV	Reissue of MGV 8240
V6S 8830	Dizzy Gillespie	The Newport Years Volume V	Reissue of MGV 8242
V6S 8831	Count Basie	The Newport Years Volume VI	Reissue of MGV 8243
V6S 8832	Jimmy Smith	Portuguese Soul	
V6S 8833	Stan Getz and Bill Evans	Previously Unreleased Recordings	
V6S 8834	Johnny Hodges	Previously Unreleased Recordings	
V6S 8835	Jimmy Witherspoon and Ben Webster	Previously Unreleased Recordings	
V6S 8836	Clark Terry and Bob Brookmeyer	Previously Unreleased Recordings	
V6S 8837	Sonny Stitt	Previously Unreleased Recordings	
V6S 8838	Gil Evans Orchestra, Kenny Burrell and Phil Woods	Previously Unreleased Recordings	
V3HB 8839	Wes Montgomery	Wes Montomery - Return Engagement	2LP Compilation
V3HB 8840	Charlie Parker	Charlie Parker - Return Engagement	2LP Compilation
V3HB 8841	Bill Evans	Bill Evans - Return Engagement	2LP Compilation
V3HB 8842	Oscar Peterson	Oscar Peterson - Return Engagement	2LP Compilation
V3HB 8843	Cal Tjader	Cal Tjader - Return Engagement	2LP Compilation
V3HB 8844	Stan Getz	Stan Getz - Return Engagement	2LP Compilation
V3HB 8845	George Benson	George Benson - Return Engagement	2LP Compilation of V/V6 8749 & V6 8771
V3HB 8846	Willie Bobo	Willie Bobo - Return Engagement	2LP Compilation
V3HB 8847	Gene Krupa	Gene Krupa - Return Engagement	2LP Compilation
V3HB 8848	Milt Jackson	Milt Jackson - Return Engagement	2LP Compilation
V3HB 8849	Lester Young	Lester Young - Return Engagement	2LP Compilation
V3HB 8850	Count Basie	Count Basie - Return Engagement	2LP Compilation
