= Johnny Rae =

American jazz musician (1934–1993)

John Anthony Pompeo (August 11, 1934 – September 4, 1993), better known as Johnny Rae, was an American jazz drummer and vibraphonist.

== Biography ==
Born in Saugus, Massachusetts, Rae graduated from East Boston High School in 1952 and studied music at the New England Conservatory and at the Berklee College of Music in the early 1950s. His mother was a night club pianist in the Boston area. His first major professional gig was with Herb Pomeroy in 1953-54; following this he played with George Shearing (1955–56), Johnny Smith (1956), Ralph Sharon (1957), Cozy Cole (1957–58), Herbie Mann (1959–60), Cal Tjader (1961–66, 1968–70), Stan Getz (1962), Gábor Szabó, Charlie Byrd, Earl Hines, Art Van Damme, and Barney Kessel. In addition to modern jazz, he also played Latin jazz percussion.

Through the 1980s Rae worked in music education and authored several instruction books. He was also a disc jockey in San Francisco for many years. From 1982 until his passing, Rae led a tribute band called "Radcliffe" in honor of his former bandleader, Cal Tjader. Musicians in the combo included Mark Levine, Robb Fisher, Vince Lateano, Willie Colón, Al Zulaica, Poncho Sanchez, and Dick Mitchell.

John was married to Mary Carroll, a San Francisco technical recruiter and author, for three years. He died on September 4, 1993, at the age of 59.

== Discography ==
=== As leader ===
- Johnny Rae's Afro-Jazz Septet Plays Herbie Mann's African Suite (United Artists, 1959)
- Opus de Jazz, Vol. 2 (Savoy, 1960)

=== As sideman ===
With Cal Tjader

- Cal Tjader Plays Harold Arlen (Fantasy, 1960)
- In a Latin Bag (Verve, 1961)
- Saturday Night/Sunday Night at the Blackhawk, San Francisco (Verve, 1962)
- Cal Tjader Plays the Contemporary Music of Mexico and Brazil (Verve, 1962)
- Soña Libré (Verve, 1963)
- Several Shades of Jade (Verve, 1963)
- Breeze from the East (Verve, 1963)
- Soul Sauce (Verve, 1964)
- Soul Bird: Whiffenpoof (Verve, 1965)
- Cal Tjader Plugs In (Skye, 1969)
- Tjader (Fantasy, 1970)

With others

- Ernestine Anderson, My Kinda Swing (Mercury, 1960)
- Stan Getz: Big Band Bossa Nova (Verve, 1962)
- Charles Kynard and Buddy Collette: Warm Winds (World Pacific, 1964)
- Earl Hines: At the Party (Delmark, 1970)
- Barney Kessel: Three Guitars (Concord, 1974)
- Herbie Mann: Flautista! (Verve, 1959), Herbie Mann's African Suite (United Artists, 1959), Flute, Brass, Vibes and Percussion (Verve, 1960), The Common Ground (Atlantic, 1960), Our Mann Flute (Atlantic, 1966)
- Anita O'Day and Cal Tjader: Time for 2 (Verve, 1962)
- Mary Stallings and Cal Tjader: Cal Tjader Plays, Mary Stallings Sings (Fantasy, 1961)
- Johnny Smith and His New Quartet (Roulette/Fresh Sound, 1956)
- Art Van Damme: State of Art (MPS, 1970)

== Sources ==
- Leonard Feather and Ira Gitler. The Biographical Encyclopedia of Jazz. Oxford, 1999, pp. 545–546.
- S. Duncan Reid. Cal Tjader: The Life and Recordings of the Man Who Revolutionized Latin Jazz. McFarland, 2013, p. 243
