= United Notions =

Studio album by Toshiko Akiyoshi
- Released: 1958
- Recorded: June 13, 1958
- Genre: Jazz
- Length: 39:22
- Label: MetroJazz Records; E 1001
- Producer: Leonard Feather

Toshiko Akiyoshi chronology
The Many Sides of Toshiko (1957)	United Notions (1958)	The Toshiko – Mariano Quartet (1961)

Professional ratings
Review scores
Source	Rating
Allmusic link	4/5 stars

The jazz album United Notions with Toshiko and her International Jazz Sextet was recorded in New York in 1958 and released on the Metrojazz label. The recording features pianist Toshiko Akiyoshi with Nat Adderley or Doc Severinsen alternating on cornet/trumpet, Bobby Jaspar playing tenor and baritone saxophone and flute, Rolf Kühn on alto saxophone and clarinet, René Thomas on guitar, Bert Dale on drums and John Drew on bass.

The album has been reissued on CD by the Spanish label Fresh Sound. The cover of this issue includes a photograph of Doc Severinsen, the only player whose photo was not included on the original MetroJazz LP cover.

== Track listing ==
LP side A

1. "Broadway" (Bird, McRae, Woode) – 6:48
2. "Sukiyaki" (Jaspar) – 6:30
3. "Swingin' Till the Girls Come Home" (Pettiford) – 6:50

LP side B

1. "United Notions" (Akiyoshi) – 6:19
2. "Civilized Folk" (Freedman) – 4:15
3. "Strike Up the Band" (G. Gershwin, I. Gershwin) – 4:24
4. "Jane" (Freedman) – 4:16

== Personnel ==
- Toshiko Akiyoshi – piano
- Nat Adderley – cornet (tracks A1, 2, 3, B2)
- Doc Severinsen – trumpet (tracks B1, 3, 4)
- Bobby Jaspar – tenor saxophone, flute, baritone saxophone
- Rolf Kühn – alto saxophone, clarinet
- René Thomas – guitar
- Bert Dale (Nils-Bertil Dahlander) – drums
- John Drew – bass

== References / external links ==
- Metrojazz E-1001, Metrojazz (US) SE1001, Metrojazz (J) MM2087, Metrojazz (J) KI7809, Metrojazz (J) POJJ1570
- Fresh Sound Records FSRCD 1636
- United Notions at Allmusic.com
- René Thomas Discography

Specific
