= Manny Oquendo =

American drummer

Manny Oquendo (January 1, 1931 – March 25, 2009) was an American percussionist of Puerto Rican ancestry. His main instruments were the timbales and the bongos.

He was a long-time member of Eddie Palmieri's Conjunto La Perfecta, which he left in the 1970s to co-lead the Conjunto Libre.

== Life and career ==
Oquendo grew up in New York City and began studying percussion in 1945. He worked in the bands of Tropical and Latin music ensembles such as Carlos Valero, Luis del Campo, Juan "El Boy" Torres, Luciano "Chano" Pozo, José Budet, Juanito Sanabria, Marcelino Guerra, José Curbelo, and Pupi Campo.

In 1950, he became the bongó player for Tito Puente. Following this he played with Tito Rodríguez in 1954 and Vicentico Valdés in 1955. He worked freelance in New York before joining Eddie Palmieri's Conjunto La Perfecta in 1962, where he helped develop the New York–style of the Mozambique rhythm.

He co-led Conjunto Libre (later simply Libre) with bassist Andy González from 1974 and had a worldwide hit with "Little Sunflower" in 1983. This Freddie Hubbard composition was included on their album Ritmo, Sonido y Estilo.

== Musical style ==
Oquendo's timbales solos were famous for their sparse, straightforward típico phrasing, reminiscent of the Cuban timbaleros of the 1940s. According to musician and producer Juan de Marcos González, Oquendo's tuning of the timbales was comparable to that of Silvano "Chori" Shueg.

Oquendo's solos also incorporated the rhythmic language of the folkloric quinto, the lead drum of rumba.

== Discography ==
- Con Salsa, Con Ritmo, Vol. 1, (Salsoul Records, 1976)
- Con Salsa, Con Ritmo Vol. 2 - Tiene Calidad, (Salsoul Records, 1978)
- Los Líderes de la Salsa (Salsoul Records, 1979)
- Libre Increíble (Salsoul Records, 1981)
- Ritmo, Sonido, y Estilo (Montuno Records, 1983)
- Mejor que Nunca (Milestone Records, 1994)
- Muévete! (Milestone, 1996)
- Ahora (Milestone, 1999)
- Los New Yorkinos (Milestone, 2000)

With Eddie Palmieri

- Eddie Palmieri y La Perfecta (1961);
- El Molestoso (1962);
- Azúcar Pa' Ti ("Sugar for You") 1965);
- Mozambique (1966);
- El Sonido Nuevo (Verve, 1966) With Cal Tjader;
- Bamboléate (Tico, 1967) With Cal Tjader;
- Molasses (1967);
- Champagne (1968);
- Justicia (1969);
- Superimposition (1970);
- Harlem River Drive (1971)

With Tito Rodriguez

- Tito Rodríguez Live at the Palladium (1960);
- Estoy Como Nunca (UA Latino, 1969);

With Grupo Folklorico y Experimental

- Lo Dice Todo (1977)

With Paul Quinichette

- Moods (EmArcy, 1954)
