= MGV =

MGV may refer to:

- MGV (composition) ("Musique à Grand Vitesse"), a 1993 composition by Michael Nyman
- MGV (TV station)
- MGV-176, a Yugoslavian sub-machine gun
- Manned Ground Vehicles, part of the U.S. Army's Future Combat Systems
- Matengo language (ISO 639:mgv)
- C31 Melbourne, with the call sign MGV-32
- A prefix used in the Verve Records discography until 1961
