= Marva Josie =

American jazz musician

Marva Josie (also known as Marva Josie Spurling) is an American jazz singer who was a longtime vocalist for Earl Hines.

== Biography ==
Josie was born on December 9, 1939, in Clairton, Pennsylvania, a suburb of Pittsburgh.

Josie first met Hines in 1968. She toured for 16 years with his quartet, and they recorded several albums together. In 1976 they played at the White House for President Gerald Ford and later for President Jimmy Carter. She was the last vocalist to tour with Hines.

Before joining Hines' group, Josie made a reputation as an R&B singer based in Detroit. She was originally trained in classical music and opera, and was known for her extraordinary (5 1/2-octave) range.

== Discography ==
- 1973: Marva Josie with Earl Hines and his Orchestra - This Is Marva Josie
- 1977: An Evening with Earl Hines ("Live at Dinklers Motor Inn"): with Tiny Grimes, Hank Young, Bert Dahlander and Marva Josie: Disques Vogue VDJ-534
- 1977: Earl "Fatha" Hines and Marva Josie – Jazz is His Old Lady... and My Old Man
- 1982: Earl Hines with Marva Josie and the 150 Band - Fatha's Birthday
- 1984: Forever Love
- N/K: First Church of Deliverance Choir featuring Earl "Fatha" Hines, Marva Josie - Songs Of Deliverance, Volume IV

=== Singles and EPs ===
- 1962: "You Lied "
- 1963: "I Don't Care"
- 1965: "I Love New York" / "Don't"
- 1965: "Birthday Fella" / "Did You Ever Love Someone"
- 1966: "Crazy Stocking's"
- 1969: "I'm Satisfied" / "Love's Burning Fire"
- 1971: "Marva Josie, Earl "Fatha" Hines Quartet - "He Does It Better" / "Scarborough Fair"
- 1973: Marva Josie, Earl Hines And His Orchestra - "Social Security" / "Can She"
- 1977: Earl "Fatha" Hines* With Marva Josie - "Jazz His Old Lady And My Old Man"
- 1986: "Love You Don't Know Me" / "Lollipop"
