= Walt Levinsky =

American musician, composer, arranger, and bandleader (1929–1999)

- Born: April 18, 1929; Paterson, New Jersey, U.S.
- Died: December 14, 1999 (aged 70) Sarasota, Florida, U.S.
- Genres: Jazz
- Occupation: Musician
- Instrument: Clarinet
- Years active: 1940s–1990s
- Formerly of: Les Elgart, Tommy Dorsey Orchestra, Benny Goodman Orchestra, The Tonight Show Band, Artie Shaw and His Orchestra

Walt Levinsky (April 18, 1929 – December 14, 1999) was an American big band and orchestral player, composer, arranger, and bandleader. While many of his big band assignments were as lead alto sax player, his favorite instrument was the clarinet.

== Musical education ==
Born in Paterson, New Jersey, he began playing the clarinet at age 9, tutored by his brother Kermit. His first formal study on clarinet and sax was with Joe Allard, a prominent New York teacher. Later Levinsky attended the Music Conservatory at Lebanon Valley College in Annville, Pennsylvania where he majored in clarinet. He was an 'A' student and the college woodwind instructor, Frank Stachow, once said to him: "You're the most talented musician that ever came to this school." His secondary instruments were alto saxophone and flute, and of course, he was required to learn keyboard while at music school.

== Musical career ==
Levinsky first assignment with a 'name' band was with the Les Elgart orchestra. Then, as a full-time professional, he replaced Buddy DeFranco in the Tommy Dorsey Orchestra which toured in the US and Cuba. During the Korean war he enlisted in the U.S. Air Force and served as a musician and member of The Airmen of Note of the U.S. Air Force Band.

After his Air Force discharge in 1954 Levinsky wanted to avoid the disruptive life of a band member on the road and settled in the New York area. Back with the Tommy Dorsey band for a brief stint, he then landed a job as reed player on a Broadway show. That was the beginning of a period when he worked as an instrumentalist in various show orchestras and also backed recording artists as a studio session musician. In 1956 when Benny Goodman was assembling a new band for an engagement at New York's Waldorf Astoria Hotel, he selected Levinsky as his lead sax player. While with the Goodman band, Levinsky was nominated by Benny as his backup player for the clarinet solos. When that engagement closed, Levinsky signed on for a summer contract with the Goodman band playing concerts in other cities.

Levinsky then joined the NBC Staff Orchestra. During this period he recorded an RCA album with the Sauter-Finegan Orchestra playing Benny Goodman's clarinet solos. While at NBC, he took various freelance assignments and also contracted to the CBS Staff band. In 1962, he graduated to The Tonight Show Band, led by Skitch Henderson (later headed by Doc Severinsen) backing The Tonight Show Starring Johnny Carson.

After leaving NBC in the late 60's, Levinsky joined MBA Music, a small New York company that produced music for commercials. This gave him the chance to move into composing, arranging and conducting. He composed, scored and conducted music for many NBC films. In the summer of 1968 he was offered the job of clarinet soloist for the re-created Artie Shaw band. Artie Shaw conducted the sessions and requested Levinsky to play his original solos note-for-note (see discography below). During these New York years he worked and recorded with many 'name' artists such as Tony Bennett, Stan Getz, Lena Horne, Gerry Mulligan, Doc Severinsen, Frank Sinatra and Sarah Vaughan. As a freelance music director he also worked and toured with other well known artists like Nina van Pallandt (of Nina & Frederik), and actor and entertainer Richard Harris.

He also composed for Score Productions, a well-known production company specializing in TV music. Levinsky is credited on a 1976 album of music cues for The Price is Right, which includes much of the show's music that is still heard today such as the showcase showdown and various car cues. One of those cues, a Nashville Brass-style country music piece, became the theme to Family Feud; the 1988 version of this theme is still used today.

The 1990s brought further success with a busy concert and touring schedule as bandleader and clarinet soloist with his Great American Swing Band.

Levinsky died in Sarasota, Florida, aged 70, from a brain tumour.

== Discography ==
- Artie Shaw Recreates His Great 38 Band, (Capitol, 1968)
- Price 1976 Library – The Eclectic Ensemble, (OmniSound, 1976)
- Walt Levinsky and his Great American Swing Band, (Kenzo, 1989)
- Walt Levinsky in Concert: As He Wanted to Be Remembered, (Arbors, 2003)

=== As sideman ===
With Art Farmer

- Listen to Art Farmer and the Orchestra (Mercury, 1962)

With Quincy Jones

- Quincy Plays for Pussycats (Mercury, 1959-65 [1965])

With Henri Rene

- Compulsion to Swing (RCA Victor, 1959)

With Don Sebesky

- Giant Box (CTI, 1973)
- The Rape of El Morro (CTI, 1975)

With Rex Stewart and Cootie Williams

- Porgy & Bess Revisited (Warner Bros., 1959)

With Cal Tjader

- Several Shades of Jade (Verve, 1963)

== Books ==
- The Melody Lingers On...An Autobiography, Walt Levinsky, Cadence Jazz Books, NY 2004
