= Herbie Mann's African Suite =

Studio album by Johnny Rae's Afro-Jazz Septet
- Released: 1959
- Recorded: 1959; NYC
- Genre: Jazz
- Length: 37:05
- Label: United Artists; UAL 4042
- Producer: Tom Wilson

Herbie Mann chronology
Flautista! (1959)	Herbie Mann's African Suite (1959)	Flute, Brass, Vibes and Percussion (1960)

Herbie Mann's African Suite (also released as St. Thomas) is an album by American jazz flautist Herbie Mann recorded in 1959 and first released on the United Artists label. The album was originally released under Johnny Rae's leadership due to Mann's contractual relationship with Verve Records.

== Reception ==
Professional ratings
Review scores
Source	Rating
AllMusic	2/5 stars

AllMusic awarded the album 2 stars.

== Track listing ==
All compositions by Herbie Mann except as indicated

1. "St. Thomas" (Sonny Rollins) - 8:05
2. "Sorimao" - 5:15
3. "Jungle Fantasy" (Esy Morales) - 7:45
4. "Bedouin" - 4:40
5. "Sudan" - 3:50
6. "Ekunda" - 3:10
7. "Guinean" - 4:20

== Personnel ==
- Herbie Mann - flute, bass clarinet
- Johnny Rae - vibraphone
- Bob Corwin - piano
- Jack Six - bass
- Philly Joe Jones - drums (tracks 1–3)
- Carlos "Patato" Valdes, Victor Pantoja - congas
- José Mangual - bongos
