= Just Wailin' =

Studio album by Herbie Mann, Charlie Rouse, Kenny Burrell and Mal Waldron
- Released: 1958
- Recorded: February 14, 1958
- Studio: Van Gelder, Hackensack
- Genre: Jazz
- Length: 40:07
- Label: New Jazz; NJLP 8211
- Producer: Bob Weinstock

Herbie Mann chronology
The Magic Flute of Herbie Mann (1957)	Just Wailin' (1958)	Flautista! (1959)

Just Wailin' is an album recorded by flautist Herbie Mann, tenor saxophonist Charlie Rouse, guitarist Kenny Burrell and pianist Mal Waldron in 1958 for the New Jazz label.

== Reception ==
Professional ratings
Review scores
Source	Rating
AllMusic	3/5 stars
The Penguin Guide to Jazz Recordings	3.5/4 stars
The Rolling Stone Jazz & Blues Album Guide	3/5 stars

AllMusic reviewer Scott Yanow stated: "The straight-ahead jam session has its strong moments, and as long as one doesn't let their expectations get out of hand, the music will be enjoyable despite the lack of wild sparks".

The authors of The Penguin Guide to Jazz Recordings called the album "Mann at his best," and commented: "The rhythm section and the choice of front-line partners gave him exactly the balance between rhythmic toughness and melodic delicacy that he needed."

Marc Myers of JazzWax remarked: "This jam session with jazz musicians who didn't need much rehearsal time had a lot of church-y soul. Most of all, the interplay between Mann's lyrical flute and Rouse's tough tenor saxophone is the highlight for me."

== Track listing ==
All compositions by Mal Waldron, except as indicated

1. "Minor Groove" - 7:34
2. "Blue Echo" - 4:15
3. "Blue Dip" (Kenny Burrell) - 9:23
4. "Gospel Truth" - 10:43
5. "Jumpin' With Symphony Sid" (Lester Young) - 3:29
6. "Trinidad" (Cal Massey) - 4:28

== Personnel ==
- Herbie Mann - flute
- Charlie Rouse - tenor saxophone
- Mal Waldron - piano
- Kenny Burrell - guitar
- George Joyner - bass
- Art Taylor - drums
