= Cal Tjader Plays the Contemporary Music of Mexico and Brazil =

Studio album by Cal Tjader
- Released: 1962
- Recorded: March 5–7, 1962
- Genre: Latin jazz, bossa nova
- Length: 37:08
- Label: Verve
- Producer: Creed Taylor

Cal Tjader chronology
The Cal Tjader Quartet/Saturday Night/Sunday Night at the Blackhawk, San Francisco (1962)	Cal Tjader Plays the Contemporary Music of Mexico and Brazil (1962)	Time for Two (1962)

Professional ratings
Review scores
Source	Rating
Allmusic	3.5/5 stars

Cal Tjader Plays the Contemporary Music of Mexico and Brazil is a 1962 studio album by Cal Tjader.

== Track listing ==
1. "Vai Querer" (Laurindo Almeida, Fernando Lobo) – 3:03
2. "Qué Tristeza" (Mario Ruiz Armengol) – 2:51
3. "Meditação (Meditation)" (Newton Mendonça, Antonio Carlos Jobim, Norman Gimbel) – 3:32
4. "Soñé" (Armengol) – 3:09
5. "Se é Tarde, Me Perdoa" (Ronaldo Bôscoli, Carlos Lyra) – 2:48
6. "Não Diga Nada" (Carlita, Noacy Mercenes) – 2:50
7. "Silenciosa" (Armengol) – 3:28
8. "Elizete" (Clare Fischer) – 2:30
9. "Imagen" (Armengol) – 2:40
10. "Tentaço do Incoveniente" (Manoel Da Conceição, Augusto Mesquita) – 2:33
11. "Preciosa" (Armengol) – 2:42
12. "Chôro e Batuque" (Almeida) – 5:02

== Personnel ==
Tracks 1, 3, 5, 6, 8, 10, and 12:

- Cal Tjader - vibraphone
- Laurindo Almeida - guitar
- Clare Fischer - piano, woodwind, arranger
- Freddie Schreiber - bass
- Johnny Rae - drums
- Milt Holland - percussion
- Gene Cipriano - woodwind
- Bernard Fleischer - woodwind
- Paul Horn - woodwind
- John Lowe - woodwind
- Don Shelton - woodwind

Tracks 2, 4, 7, 9, and 11:

- Cal Tjader - vibraphone
- Clare Fischer - piano, woodwind, arranger
- Freddie Schreiber - bass
- Johnny Rae - timbales
- Changuito - conga
- Paul Horn - woodwind
- John Lowe - woodwind
- Don Shelton - woodwind
- Ardeen DeCamp - vocals
