= Warm Wave =

Studio album by Cal Tjader
- Released: 1964
- Recorded: May 8, 11 & 13 and June 18, 1964
- Studio: A&R Studios, New York City, NY and Van Gelder Studio, Englewood Cliffs, NJ
- Genre: Jazz
- Length: 28:20
- Label: Verve; V/V6-8585
- Producer: Creed Taylor

Cal Tjader chronology
Breeze from the East (1964)	Warm Wave (1964)	Soul Sauce (1965)

Warm Wave is an album by Latin jazz vibraphonist Cal Tjader fronting an orchestra arranged and conducted by Claus Ogerman recorded in 1964 and released on the Verve label.

== Reception ==
Professional ratings
Review scores
Source	Rating
Allmusic	3/5 stars

The Allmusic review by Stephen Cook stated, "If an album ever betrayed Cal Tjader's affinity for former boss George Shearing's ultra-smooth cocktail style, then Warm Wave would be it ... this is less standard Latin lounge Tjader and more an analog to Jackie Gleason's polished easy-listening sound. Tjader's solos are so smooth, in fact, that they practically disappear into Claus Ogerman's opaque arrangements. If you are in the business of collecting classic lounge records, this rates as a good one".

== Track listing ==
1. "Where Or When" (Richard Rodgers, Lorenz Hart) – 2:47
2. "Violets for Your Furs" (Matt Dennis, Tom Adair) – 3:02
3. "People" (Jule Styne, Bob Merrill) – 2:31
4. "Poor Butterfly" (Raymond Hubbell, John Golden) – 2:13
5. "This Time the Dream's on Me" (Harold Arlen, Johnny Mercer) – 1:57
6. "Ev'ry Time We Say Goodbye" (Cole Porter) – 2:44
7. "I'm Old Fashioned" (Jerome Kern, Mercer) – 2:28
8. "The Way You Look Tonight" (Kern, Dorothy Fields) – 3:05
9. "Just Friends" (John Klenner, Sam M. Lewis) – 2:18
10. "Sunset Blvd." (Claus Ogerman) – 2:35
11. "Passé" (Joseph Meyer, Carl Sigman, Eddie DeLange) – 2:40

== Personnel ==
- Cal Tjader – vibraphone
- Claus Ogerman – arranger, conductor
- Seldon Powell, Jerome Richardson – tenor saxophone
- Patti Bown, Hank Jones, Bernie Leighton – piano
- Kenny Burrell, Jimmy Raney – guitar
- George Duvivier – bass
- Ed Shaughnessy – drums
- Willie Rodriguez – percussion
- Les Double Six – vocals (tracks 3, 4 & 7–11)
- Unidentified string section (tracks 1–3, 5, 6, 8, 9 & 11)
