= El Sonido Nuevo =

Studio album by Cal Tjader and Eddie Palmieri
- Released: 1966
- Recorded: May 24, 25 and 26, 1966
- Studio: Van Gelder Studio, Englewood Cliffs, NJ
- Genre: Jazz
- Length: 31:30
- Label: Verve; V6-8651
- Producer: Creed Taylor

Cal Tjader chronology
| Soul Burst (1966) | El Sonido Nuevo (1966) | Along Comes Cal (1967) |

El Sonido Nuevo, subtitled/translated The New Soul Sound, is an album by Latin jazz vibraphonist Cal Tjader and pianist Eddie Palmieri recorded in 1966 and released on the Verve label.

== Reception ==
Professional ratings
Review scores
| Source | Rating |
|---|---|
| Allmusic | 3.5/5 stars |

The Allmusic review by Scott Yanow stated, "El Sonido Nuevo is a popular collaboration between vibraphonist Cal Tjader and pianist Eddie Palmieri (who provided the arrangements). Despite the claims of greatness expressed in the liners ("a landmark in the history of Latin jazz"), much of the music is actually quite lightweight although enjoyable enough, and the easy listening melodies and accessible rhythms hold one's interest".

== Track listing ==
All compositions by Cal Tjader and Eddie Palmieri except where noted

1. "Los Jibaros" (Ray Rivera, Vin Roddie) - 2:40
2. "Gaujira en Azul" - 3:20
3. "Ritmo Uni" (Palmieri, Jose Rodriguez) - 3:45
4. "Picadillo" (Tito Puente) - 7:00
5. "Modesty ("Modesty Blaise" Theme)" (John Dankworth, Benny Green) - 2:30
6. "Unidos" - 4:35
7. "On a Clear Day (You Can See Forever)" (Burton Lane, Alan Jay Lerner) - 1:50
8. "El Sonido Nuevo" - 5:50
- Recorded at Van Gelder Studio in Englewood Cliffs, NJ on May 24, 1966 (tracks 3 & 4), May 25, 1966 (tracks 2 & 7) and May 26, 1966, (tracks 1, 5, 6 & 8)

== Personnel ==
- Cal Tjader - vibraphone
- Eddie Palmieri - piano, arranger
- Julian Priester, Jose Rodriguez, Mark Weinstein - trombone
- Barry Rogers - trombone, congas
- George Castro - flute, percussion
- Bobby Rodriguez - bass
- Tommy Lopez, Manny Oquendo - drums
- Ismael Quintana - percussion
