= Vince Lateano =

American jazz drummer (born 1942)

- Origin: Sacramento, California, U.S.
- Genres: Jazz
- Occupation: Musician
- Instrument(s): Drums, percussion

Vince Lateano (born 1942) is an American jazz drummer who has toured with numerous jazz musicians over the years, including Cal Tjader, Woody Herman, Vince Guaraldi, and Stan Getz.

Lateano was born in Sacramento, California in 1942, and was introduced to music by a family of musicians who lived close to him. He began playing the trumpet in the fourth grade, but switched to drums in the ninth grade. After the US Army, he moved to San Francisco in 1966. He joined Cal Tjader's band in 1978 until Tjader died in 1982. Lateano drummed on six of Tjader's albums.
