= Soul Sauce =

Studio album by Cal Tjader
- Released: 1965
- Recorded: November 19, 20 & 23, 1964
- Studios: Van Gelder Studio, Englewood Cliffs, NJ and A & R Studios, New York City
- Genre: Jazz
- Length: 57:54
- Labels: Verve; V6-8614
- Producer: Creed Taylor

Cal Tjader chronology
Warm Wave (1964)	Soul Sauce (1965)	Soul Bird: Whiffenpoof (1966)

Soul Sauce is an album by Latin jazz vibraphonist Cal Tjader recorded in late 1964 and released on the Verve label.

== Reception ==
Professional ratings
Review scores
Source	Rating
Allmusic	4.5/5 stars
The Penguin Guide to Jazz Recordings	3/4 stars

The Allmusic review by Stephen Cook awarded the album 4½ stars, stating: "Soul Sauce is one of the highlights from Tjader's catalog with its appealing mixture of mambo, samba, bolero, and boogaloo styles... an album full of smart arrangements, subtly provocative vibe solos, and intricate percussion backing."

== Track listing ==
1. "Soul Sauce (Guachi Guaro)" (Dizzy Gillespie, Chano Pozo) - 2:24
2. "Afro Blue" (Mongo Santamaría) - 4:27
3. "Pantano" (Lonnie Hewitt) - 3:35
4. "Somewhere in the Night" (Billy May, Milt Raskin) - 3:14
5. "Maramoor Mambo" (Armando Peraza) - 4:00
6. "Tanya" (Hewitt) - 5:28
7. "Leyte" (Lonnie Hewitt, Cal Tjader) - 5:18
8. "Spring Is Here" (Lorenz Hart, Richard Rodgers) - 4:00
9. "João" (Clare Fischer) - 4:50
10. "Soul Sauce (Guachi Guaro)" [rough mix] (Gillespie, Pozo) - 2:30 Bonus track on CD reissue
11. "Monkey Beams" (Gary McFarland) - 5:40 Bonus track on CD reissue
12. "Ming" (Composer Unknown) - 8:39 Bonus track on CD reissue
13. "Mamblues" (Cal Tjader) - 3:49 Bonus track on CD reissue
- Recorded at Van Gelder Studio in Englewood Cliffs, NJ on November 19 (track 2), at A & R Studios in New York City on November 20 (tracks 1, 3–10 & 13), and in New York City on November 23 (tracks 11 & 12), 1964

== Personnel ==
- Cal Tjader - vibraphone
- Lonnie Hewitt - piano
- Kenny Burrell - guitar (tracks 2, 11 & 12)
- Richard Davis (track 2), John Hilliard (tracks 1, 3–10 & 13) - bass
- Bob Bushnell - electric bass (tracks 11 & 12)
- Grady Tate (tracks 2, 11 & 12), Johnny Rae (tracks 1, 3–10 & 13) - drums
- Willie Bobo, Armando Peraza, Alberto Valdes - percussion
- Donald Byrd - trumpet (tracks 2, 11 & 12)
- Jimmy Heath - tenor saxophone (tracks 2, 11 & 12)
- June Magruder - vocals (track 1)
