= Jazz at the Hollywood Bowl =

Live album by various artists
- Released: 1957
- Label: Verve

Jazz at the Hollywood Bowl is a live album released by Verve Records in 1957.

== Recording ==
The album was recorded at the Hollywood Bowl in Los Angeles on 15 August 1956.

== Critical reception ==
Professional ratings
Review scores
Source	Rating
AllMusic	4/5 stars
Billboard	positive

Billboard reviewed the album in its issue from 28 October 1957, writing: "A must package for jazz lovers, which history will prove to be a collectors' gem. [...] Repertoire has wide appeal and concert flavor adds tremendously."

== Track listing ==
2 × 12-inch LP (Verve – MG V-8231-2)

Side 1
No.	Title	Artist(s)	Length
1.	"Introduction"	Norman Granz
2.	"Jam Session" "Honeysuckle Rose"	Harry Edison, Flip Phillips, Illinois Jacquet, Roy Eldridge, Oscar Peterson, Herb Ellis, Ray Brown, Buddy Rich
3.	"The Ballad Medley" a) "I Can't Get Started" b) "If I Had You"" b) "I've Got the World on a String"	Roy Eldridge; Harry Edison; Flip Phillips

Side 2
No.	Title	Artist(s)	Length
1.	"Jam Session" "Jumpin' at the Woodside"	Illinois Jacquet, Harry Edison, Roy Eldridge
2.	"Drum Solo"	Buddy Rich
3.	"9:20 Special"	The Oscar Peterson Trio
4.	"How About You"	The Oscar Peterson Trio

Side 3
No.	Title	Artist(s)	Length
1.	"Someone to Watch over Me"	Art Tatum
2.	"Begin the Beguine"	Art Tatum
3.	"Willow Weep for Me"	Art Tatum
4.	"Humoresque"	Art Tatum
5.	"Love for Sale"	Ella Fitzgerald
6.	"Just One of Those Things"	Ella Fitzgerald
7.	"Little Girl Blue"	Ella Fitzgerald

Side 4
No.	Title	Artist(s)	Length
1.	"Too Close for Comfort"	Ella Fitzgerald
2.	"I Can't Give You Anything but Love"	Ella Fitzgerald
3.	"Airmail Special"	Ella Fitzgerald
4.	"You Won't Be Satisfied"	Ella Fitzgerald and Louis Armstrong and his orchestra
5.	"Undecided"	Ella Fitzgerald and Louis Armstrong and his orchestra
6.	"When the Saints Go Marching In"	Various
