= Breeze from the East =

Studio album by Cal Tjader
- Released: May 1964
- Recorded: November 26–December 2, 1963
- Genre: Jazz
- Label: Verve V6-8507

Cal Tjader chronology
Several Shades of Jade (1963)	Breeze from the East (1964)	Warm Wave (1964)

Breeze from the East is a 1964 album by vibraphonist Cal Tjader, arranged by Stan Applebaum. The album features jazzy lounge music with a quasi-Asian sound.

== Reception ==
Professional ratings
Review scores
Source	Rating
Allmusic	3/5 stars

Stephen Cook reviewed the album for Allmusic and described the album as combining "the vibist's [Tjader's] Latin lounge style with kitschy Asian touches" describing the songs "Sake and Greens," "Cha," and "Shoji" as sounding like "'60s-era James Bond on a wild chase through the heart of Tokyo". Cook concluded by feeling that "The ultra-smooth Latin jazz sound Tjader favored has always been more infectious than demanding and Breeze from the East's commercialized mod/eastern elements only end up expanding the pop exotica mix".

== Track listing ==
1. "Sake and Greens" (Stan Applebaum) – 2:24
2. "Cha" (Applebaum) – 3:03
3. "Leyte" (Cal Tjader, Lonnie Hewitt) – 3:00
4. "Shoji" (Applebaum) – 2:33
5. "China Nights" (Nobuyuki Takeoka, Sedores, Yaso Saijo) – 2:28
6. "Fuji" (Tjader) – 2:23
7. "Black Orchid" (Tjader) – 3:04
8. "Theme from Burke's Law" (Herschel Burke Gilbert) – 2:37
9. "Stardust" (Hoagy Carmichael, Mitchell Parish) – 2:45
10. "Poinciana" (Buddy Bernier, Nat Simon) – 3:23
11. "East of the Sun (and West of the Moon)" (Brooks Bowman) – 2:23

== Personnel ==
- Cal Tjader – vibraphone
- Stan Applebaum – arranger, celesta
- George Duvivier – double bass
- Jerry Dodgion – flute
- Dick Hyman – electronic organ
- Lonnie Hewitt – piano
- Willie Bobo – percussion
- Johnny Rae – drums

Production

- John Murello – cover design
- Phil Ramone – engineer
- Val Valentin – director of engineering
- Al "Jazzbo" Collins, Jack Maher – liner notes
- Creed Taylor – producer
