= Leonard Feather's Encyclopedia of Jazz =

Compilation album by various artists
- Released: 1967
- Recorded: November 3–4, 1966
- Studio: Van Gelder Studio, Englewood Cliffs
- Genre: Jazz
- Length: 33:50 (Nelson tracks)
- Label: Verve; V6-8677

Leonard Feather's Encyclopedia of Jazz (a.k.a. Encyclopedia of Jazz, Vol. 1) is a compilation album of pieces by Oliver Nelson and others assembled by Leonard Feather. It was recorded in 1965 and 1966 for Verve Records. In 2006, Mosaic Records released all the Oliver Nelson tracks, together with some unissued pieces recorded at the same session, on the second CD of the compilation, Oliver Nelson: The Argo, Verve and Impulse Big Band Studio Sessions. Some of them were also included at the time on the album Leonard Feather Presents the Sound of Feeling and the Sound of Oliver Nelson (V6-8743, 1968).

== Track listing ==
Encyclopedia of Jazz, Vol. 1
No.	Title	Writer(s)	Length
1.	"Blues for Eileen"	Eric Dixon
2.	"C Jam Blues"	Duke Ellington
3.	"O.G.D. (Road Song)"	Wes Montgomery
4.	"St. Louis Blues"	W. C. Handy
5.	"I Remember Bird"	Leonard Feather
6.	"John Brown's Blues"	Oliver Nelson

Oliver Nelson: The Argo, Verve and Impulse Big Band Studio Sessions (CD 2)
No.	Title	Writer(s)	Length
1.	"St. Louis Blues"	Handy	6:10
2.	"I Remember Bird"	Feather	6:28
3.	"Ricardo's Dilemma"	Roy Ayers	2:33
4.	"Patterns for Orchestra"	Nelson	3:13
5.	"The Sidewalks of New York" (a.k.a. "East Side, West Side")	Charles B. Lawlor; James W. Blake	6:30
6.	"Greensleeves"	traditional English folk song	2:28
7.	"John Brown's Blues"	Nelson	3:22
8.	"Twelve Tone Blues"	Feather	3:06
Total length:			33:50

- Recorded on November 3 (#1–4) and November 4 (#5–8), 1966

== Personnel ==
- Burt Collins, Joe Newman, Ernie Royal, Clark Terry, Joe Wilder, Snooky Young – trumpet, flugelhorn
- Jimmy Cleveland, J. J. Johnson – trombone
- Bob Brookmeyer – valve trombone
- Tony Studd – bass trombone
- Phil Woods – alto saxophone, clarinet
- Jerry Dodgion – alto saxophone, clarinet, flute
- Jerome Richardson, Zoot Sims – tenor saxophone, soprano saxophone, flute
- Danny Bank – baritone saxophone
- Al Dailey – piano
- Eric Gale – guitar
- Ron Carter – bass
- Grady Tate – drums
- Phil Kraus – percussion
