= Soul Burst =

Studio album by Cal Tjader
- Released: 1966
- Recorded: February 9, 10, 11, 1966
- Studios: Van Gelder Studio, Englewood Cliffs, New Jersey
- Genre: Jazz
- Length: 38:46
- Labels: Verve; V6-8637
- Producer: Creed Taylor

Cal Tjader chronology
Soul Bird: Whiffenpoof (1966)	Soul Burst (1966)	El Sonido Nuevo (1966)

Soul Burst is an album by American Latin jazz vibraphonist Cal Tjader recorded in early 1966 and released on the Verve label.

== Reception ==
Professional ratings
Review scores
Source	Rating
Allmusic	3/5 stars
The Penguin Guide to Jazz Recordings	3/4 stars

The Allmusic review by Scott Yanow awarded the album 3 stars, stating, "the music is quite catchy and accessible, commercial but still creative within the genre".

== Track listing ==
1. "Cuchy Frito Man" (Ray Rivera, Vin Roddie) – 2:20
2. "Descarga Cubana" (Osvaldo Estivill) – 2:55
3. "Soul Burst" (Cal Tjader) – 4:38
4. "The Bilbao Song" (Bertolt Brecht, Kurt Weill) – 2:16
5. "Manteca" (Gil Fuller, Dizzy Gillespie, Chano Pozo) – 6:34
6. "It Didn't End" (João Donato) – 3:55
7. "My Ship" (Ira Gershwin, Weill) – 2:59
8. "Morning" (Clare Fischer) – 2:56
9. "Orán" (Chick Corea) – 3:58
10. "Curaçao" (Tjader) – 6:15
- Recorded at Van Gelder Studio in Englewood Cliffs, New Jersey on February 9 (tracks 3 & 10), February 10 (tracks 2, 6, 8, & 9) and February 11 (tracks 1, 4, 5 & 7), 1966

== Personnel ==
- Cal Tjader – vibraphone, cabasa, cymbals
- Jerome Richardson, Jerry Dodgion, Seldon Powell – flute
- Attila Zoller – guitar
- Chick Corea – piano, arranger on track 9
- Richard Davis, Bobby Rodriguez – bass
- Grady Tate – drums
- Carlos "Patato" Valdes – congas, vocals
- Jose Mangual – timbales, bongos
- Victor Pantoja – percussion
- Oliver Nelson – arranger on tracks 1, 5, 7
