= Several Shades of Jade =

Studio album by Cal Tjader
- Released: 1963
- Recorded: April 23–25, 1963
- Genre: Jazz
- Label: Verve V6-8507

Cal Tjader chronology
Soña Libré (1963)	Several Shades of Jade (1963)	Breeze from the East (1964)

Several Shades of Jade is a 1963 album by Cal Tjader arranged by Lalo Schifrin. It peaked at 79 on the Billboard 200.

== Reception ==
Professional ratings
Review scores
Source	Rating
Allmusic	4/5 stars

Stewart Mason reviewed the album for Allmusic and wrote that of Tjader and Schifrin's collaboration that it was "...no more traditional Asian music than Tjader's similar albums from this period are traditional Latin American music, but the pair wisely avoids the standard clichés of Asian music (no smashing gongs after every musical phrase or melodies that sound like rejects from The Mikado). Instead, Schifrin frames Tjader's meditative vibraphone solos in arrangements that strike a cool balance between western kitsch and eastern exotica, never tipping too far in either direction. ...Several Shades of Jade is actually an interesting experiment that succeeds more often than it fails."

== Track listing ==
1. "The Fakir" (Lalo Schifrin)
2. "Cherry Blossom" (Ronnell Bright)
3. "Borneo" (Schifrin)
4. "Tokyo Blues" (Horace Silver)
5. "Song of the Yellow River" (Schifrin)
6. "Sahib" (Stan Applebaum)
7. "China Nights (Shina No Yoru)" (Yaso Saijo, Nobuyki Takeoka)
8. "Almond Tree" (Schifrin)
9. "Hot Sake" (Quincy Jones)

== Personnel ==
- Cal Tjader – vibraphone
- Lalo Schifrin – arranger, piano (track 3)
- George Duvivier – bass
- George Berg – bass clarinet, bassoon
- Charles McCracken – cello (tracks 1, 2)
- Jack Del Rio – congas, tambourine
- Ed Shaughnessy – drums
- Walt Levinsky – flute, woodwind
- Robert Northern – French horn (tracks 3–9)
- Jim Raney – guitar
- Robert Maxwell – harp
- Irving Horowitz, Leon Cohen – oboe
- Johnny Rae – timbales, percussion
- Urbie Green – trombone (tracks 3–9)
- Clark Terry, Ernie Royal – trumpet (tracks 3–9)
- Don Butterfield – tuba
- Arnold Eidus, Emanuel Vardi, Leo Kruczek – violin (tracks 1, 2)
- Phil Bodner, Stan Webb – woodwinds
- Phil Kraus – xylophone (miscredited as a woodwind player on CD reissue)

Production

- John Murello – cover design
- Irv Bahrt – cover photo
- Chuck Stewart – liner photography
- Bob Simpson – engineer
- Val Valentin – director of engineering
- Jack Maher – liner notes
- Creed Taylor – producer
