= Flautista! =

Live album by Herbie Mann
- Released: 1960
- Recorded: June 30, 1959; Basin Street East, NYC
- Genre: Jazz
- Length: 50:17 CD reissue with bonus tracks
- Label: Verve; MGV 8336
- Producer: Norman Granz

Herbie Mann chronology
Just Wailin' (1958)	Flautista! (1960)	Herbie Mann's African Suite (1959)

Flautista! (subtitled Herbie Mann Plays Afro Cuban Jazz) is a live album by American jazz flautist Herbie Mann recorded in 1959 for the Verve label.

== Reception ==
Professional ratings
Review scores
Source	Rating
AllMusic	4/5 stars
DownBeat	4/5 stars
The Penguin Guide to Jazz Recordings	2.5/4 stars

AllMusic awarded the album 4 stars stating " Flautista!, recorded live at New York City's Basin Street East in June 1959, captures the flutist's deepening immersion in global rhythms and harmonies, documenting a pan-cultural jazz aesthetic that points the way for the myriad world music efforts that followed in its wake".

== Track listing ==
All compositions by Herbie Mann except as indicated

1. "Todos Locos" - 5:35
2. "Cuban Patato Chip" - 7:45
3. "Come on, Mule" - 7:18
4. "The Amazon River" - 8:35
5. "Caravan" (Juan Tizol) - 9:46
6. "Delilah" (Victor Young) - 6:06 Bonus track on CD reissue
7. "Basin Street Este" - 5:12 Bonus track on CD reissue

== Personnel ==
- Herbie Mann - flute, bass clarinet
- Johnny Rae - vibraphone, marimba
- Knobby Totah - bass
- Santo Miranda - drums, percussion
- Carlos "Patato" Valdes - congas, percussion
- José Luis Mangual - bongos, percussion
