= Soña Libré =

Studio album by Cal Tjader
- Released: 1963
- Recorded: January 28–30, 1963 in Los Angeles, California
- Genre: Jazz
- Length: 31:37
- Label: Verve V6-8531
- Producer: Creed Taylor

Cal Tjader chronology
Time for 2 (1962)	Soña Libré (1963)	Several Shades of Jade (1963)

Soña Libré is a 1962 album by Cal Tjader.

== Reception ==
Professional ratings
Review scores
Source	Rating
Allmusic	3/5 stars

Billboard magazine reviewed the album in their May 25, 1963 issue and wrote that on the album Tjader has "a solid collection of tracks that have swing and a quiet insistent sound".

== Track listing ==
1. "Hip Walk" (Cal Tjader) – 2:33
2. "Sally's Tomato" (Tjader) – 3:14
3. "O Barquinho (The Little Boat)" (Ronaldo Boscoli, Roberto Menescal) – 4:24
4. "El Muchacho" (Herbert Owen Reed) – 2:59
5. "Insight" (Bill Fitch) – 5:35
6. "My Reverie" (Larry Clinton, Claude Debussy) – 2:44
7. "Manhã de Carnaval" (Luiz Bonfá, Antônio Maria) – 6:17
8. "Azul" (Tjader) – 2:47
9. "Invitation" (Bronisław Kaper, Paul Francis Webster) – 4:08
10. "Alonzo" (Lonnie Hewitt) – 4:21

== Personnel ==
- Cal Tjader – vibraphone
- Clare Fischer – electronic organ, piano
- Freddy Schreiber – double bass
- Bill Fitch – congas
- Johnny Rae – drums, timbales
- Creed Taylor – producer
