= The Many Sides of Toshiko =

Studio album by Toshiko Akiyoshi
- Released: 1957
- Recorded: 28 September 1957
- Venue: New York City
- Genre: Jazz
- Length: 40:29
- Label: Verve

Toshiko Akiyoshi chronology
Toshiko and Leon Sash at Newport (1957)	The Many Sides of Toshiko (1957)	United Notions (1958)

The Many Sides of Toshiko is a jazz piano trio album by Toshiko Akiyoshi, recorded in New York in 1957 and released on the Verve label.

== Track listing ==
LP side A

1. "The Man I Love" (G. Gershwin, I. Gershwin) – 5:27
2. "Minor Moods" ("Midnight Lament") (Brown (Ahmad Kharab Salim)) – 4:16
3. "After You've Gone" (Layton, Creamer) – 3:35
4. "We'll Be Together Again" (Fischer, Laine) – 4:29
5. "Studio J" (Akiyoshi) – 3:15

LP side B

1. "Tosh's Fantasy" (Akiyoshi) – 9:04
  1. "Down a Mountain"
  2. "Phrygian Waterfall"
  3. "Running Stream"
2. "Bags' Groove" (Jackson) – 6:48
3. "Imagination" (Van Heusen, Burke) – 3:35

== Personnel ==
- Toshiko Akiyoshi – piano
- Jake Hanna – drums
- Gene Cherico – bass

== References / external links ==
- Allmusic – The Many Sides of Toshiko
- Verve MGV-8273
