= In a Latin Bag =

Studio album by Cal Tjader
- Released: November 1961
- Recorded: August 28–29, 1961
- Studio: Los Angeles, CA
- Genre: Jazz
- Length: 32:31
- Label: Verve V/V6 8419
- Producer: Creed Taylor

Cal Tjader chronology
Cal Tjader Plays Harold Arlen (1961)	In a Latin Bag (1961)	Saturday Night / Sunday Night at the Blackhawk, San Francisco (1962)

In a Latin Bag is an album by American jazz vibraphonist Cal Tjader featuring performances recorded in 1961 and released on the Verve label.

== Reception ==
Professional ratings
Review scores
Source	Rating
AllMusic	3/5 stars

AllMusic awarded the album 3 stars stating "Cal Tjader recorded prolifically for Verve during the first half of the 1960s, though this is one of his lesser-known dates ... it is well worth snapping up if found".

== Track listing ==
All compositions by Cal Tjader except where noted.

1. "Ben-Hur" (Miklós Rózsa) – 2:25
2. "Green Dolphin Street" (Bronisław Kaper, Ned Washington) – 5:30
3. "Pauneto´s Point" – 3:04
4. "Speak Low" (Kurt Weill, Ogden Nash) – 2:57
5. "Triste" – 4:01
6. "Misty" (Erroll Garner) – 2:48
7. "Mambo in Miami" (Armando Peraza) – 2:40
8. "Ecstasy" (Paul Horn) – 2:30
9. "Half and Half" (Horn) – 4:01

== Personnel ==
- Cal Tjader – vibraphone, piano
- Paul Horn – flute, alto saxophone
- Lonnie Hewitt – piano
- Al McKibbon – bass
- Johnny Rae – drums
- Wilfredo Vicente – congas
- Armando Peraza – bongos

Technical

- Pete Turner – photography
