= Soul Bird: Whiffenpoof =

Studio album by Cal Tjader
- Released: 1965
- Recorded: June 1, 2 & 22, 1965
- Studio: A & R Recording Studios, New York City and Van Gelder Studio, Englewood Cliffs, NJ
- Genre: Jazz
- Length: 36:58
- Label: Verve; V6-8626
- Producer: Creed Taylor

Cal Tjader chronology
Soul Sauce (1965)	Soul Bird: Whiffenpoof (1965)	Soul Burst (1966)

Soul Bird: Whiffenpoof is an album by Latin jazz vibraphonist Cal Tjader recorded in 1965 and released on the Verve label.

== Reception ==
Professional ratings
Review scores
Source	Rating
Allmusic	3/5 stars
The Penguin Guide to Jazz Recordings	2.5/4 stars

The Allmusic review by Alex Henderson awarded the album 3 stars stating, "it's an enjoyable demonstration of the vibist's ability to be a bit more commercial than usual and still maintain his bop-based integrity".

== Track listing ==
1. "The Whiffenpoof Song" (Tod Galloway, Meade Minnigerode, George S. Pomeroy) - 2:04
2. "Soul Bird (Tin Tin Deo)" (Gil Fuller, Dizzy Gillespie, Chano Pozo) - 2:41
3. "How High the Moon" (Nancy Hamilton, Morgan Lewis) - 4:08
4. "That's All" (Bob Haymes, Alan Brandt) - 2:04
5. "Soul Motion" (Lonnie Hewitt) - 3:10
6. "Reza" (Rey Guerra, Edu Lobo) - 4:10
7. "The Prophet" (Cal Tjader) - 3:01
8. "Sonny Boy" (Lew Brown, Buddy DeSylva, Ray Henderson) - 3:32
9. "Doxy" (Sonny Rollins) - 4:21
10. "Samba de Orfeu" (Luiz Bonfá) - 2:01
11. "Shiny Stockings" (Frank Foster) - 2:33
12. "Daddy Wong Legs" (Tjader) - 3:41
- Recorded at A & R Studios in New York City on June 1 & 2 (tracks 1, 5, 6, 9 & 12), and at Van Gelder Studio in Englewood Cliffs, NJ on June 22 (tracks 2–4, 7, 8, 10 & 11), 1965

== Personnel ==
- Cal Tjader - vibraphone
- Paul Griffin (tracks 1, 5, 6, 9 & 12), Lonnie Hewitt (tracks 2–4, 7, 8, 10 & 11) - piano
- Richard Davis (tracks 1, 5, 6, 9 & 12), John Hilliard (tracks 2–4, 7, 8, 10 & 11) - bass
- Grady Tate (tracks 1, 5, 6, 9 & 12), Johnny Rae (tracks 2–4, 7, 8, 10 & 11) - drums
- Armando Peraza - percussion
