= Time for 2 =

1962 album by Anita O'Day and Cal Tjader

Studio album by Anita O'Day and Cal Tjader
- Released: 1962
- Recorded: February 26–28, 1962, RCA Studios, Los Angeles, California
- Genre: Jazz
- Length: 31:37
- Label: Verve V6-8472
- Producer: Creed Taylor

Anita O'Day chronology
All the Sad Young Men (1962)	Time for 2 (1962)	Anita O'Day & the Three Sounds (1963)

Cal Tjader chronology
Live and Direct (1962)	Time for 2 (1962)	Soña Libré (1963)

Time for 2 is a 1962 album by Anita O'Day and Cal Tjader.

== Reception ==
Professional ratings
Review scores
Source	Rating
Allmusic	4/5 stars
New Record Mirror	4/5 stars
The Penguin Guide to Jazz Recordings	3/4 stars

Billboard magazine reviewed the album in their September 1, 1962, issue and wrote that "Tjader kicks in with some strong instrumental choruses and his combo accompanies in high style whether playing straight or Latin time".

Richard S. Ginell reviewed the reissue of the album for AllMusic and wrote that "O'Day sounds as if she is delighted with Tjader's polished Afro-Cuban grooves, gliding easily over the rhythms, toying with the tunes, transforming even a tune so locked into its trite time as 'Mr. Sandman' into a stimulating excursion. Indeed, O'Day's freewheeling phrasing becomes downright sexy on 'That's Your Red Wagon' and Dave Frishberg's delicious parody of a spoiled honeybunch, 'Peel Me a Grape.'" Ginell also praised producer Creed Taylor's "...obsession with good engineering and tasteful applications of reverb", which led to her voice sounding "much fuller and more attractive in his productions than on her Norman Granz-produced albums".

== Track listing ==
1. "Thanks for the Memory" (Ralph Rainger, Leo Robin) – 2:45
2. "It Shouldn't Happen to a Dream" (Duke Ellington, Don George, Johnny Hodges) – 2:59
3. "Just in Time" (Betty Comden, Adolph Green, Jule Styne) – 2:47
4. "Under a Blanket of Blue" (Jerry Livingston, Al J. Neiburg, Marty Symes) – 2:22
5. "That's Your Red Wagon" (Gene De Paul, Richard M. Jones, Don Raye) – 2:49
6. "Peel Me a Grape" (Dave Frishberg) – 3:03
7. "An Occasional Man" (Ralph Blane, Hugh Martin) – 2:27
8. "The Party's Over" (Comden, Green, Styne) – 2:20
9. "I Believe in You" (Frank Loesser) – 2:23
10. "Mr. Sandman" (Pat Ballard) – 1:55
11. "Spring Will Be a Little Late This Year" (Loesser) – 3:24
12. "I'm Not Supposed to Be Blue Blues" (Bob Russell) – 2:23

== Personnel ==
- Anita O'Day – vocals
- Cal Tjader – vibraphone
- Bob Corwin, Lonnie Hewitt – piano
- Freddy Schreiber – double bass
- Wilfredo "Changuito" Vicente – congas
- Johnny Rae – drums
- Don Gold – liner notes
- Al Schmitt – engineer
- Creed Taylor – producer
