= Bert Dahlander =

Nils-Bertil Dahlander
- Also known as: Bert Dahlander
- Born: May 13, 1928; Gothenburg
- Died: June 6, 2011 (aged 83); Mesquite, Nevada
- Genres: Jazz
- Occupation: Drummer
- Formerly of: Teddy Wilson, Chet Baker,

Nils-Bertil Dahlander, nicknamed Bert Dahlander but also known as Bert Dale, was a Swedish Jazz percussionist. Self-taught in violin and piano, he attended Juilliard and began his career playing on Thore Ehrling's radio band. He started visiting the US in 1954, first playing at The Beehive house band in Chicago, and working with Terry Gibbs for a year. He then played with Lars Gullin, before returning to the US in 1957 to rejoin Gibbs.

He performed as a member of Teddy Wilson's group, along with Gene Ramey and Al Lucas; they recorded several Columbia LPs, and was originally nicknamed Bert by Wilson. He also worked with Ben Webster in Sweden.

He was Cannonball Adderley's drummer for a time and toured across Europe with Chet Baker during 1955–56 (recording with Baker as well). He recorded the album Skål (Bert Dahlander and His Swedish Jazz) on Verve Records.

After his touring retirement in 1964, he played for many years in the house band at the Tippler at the base of Aspen Mountain.
