= Cal Tjader =

American vibraphonist (1925–1982)

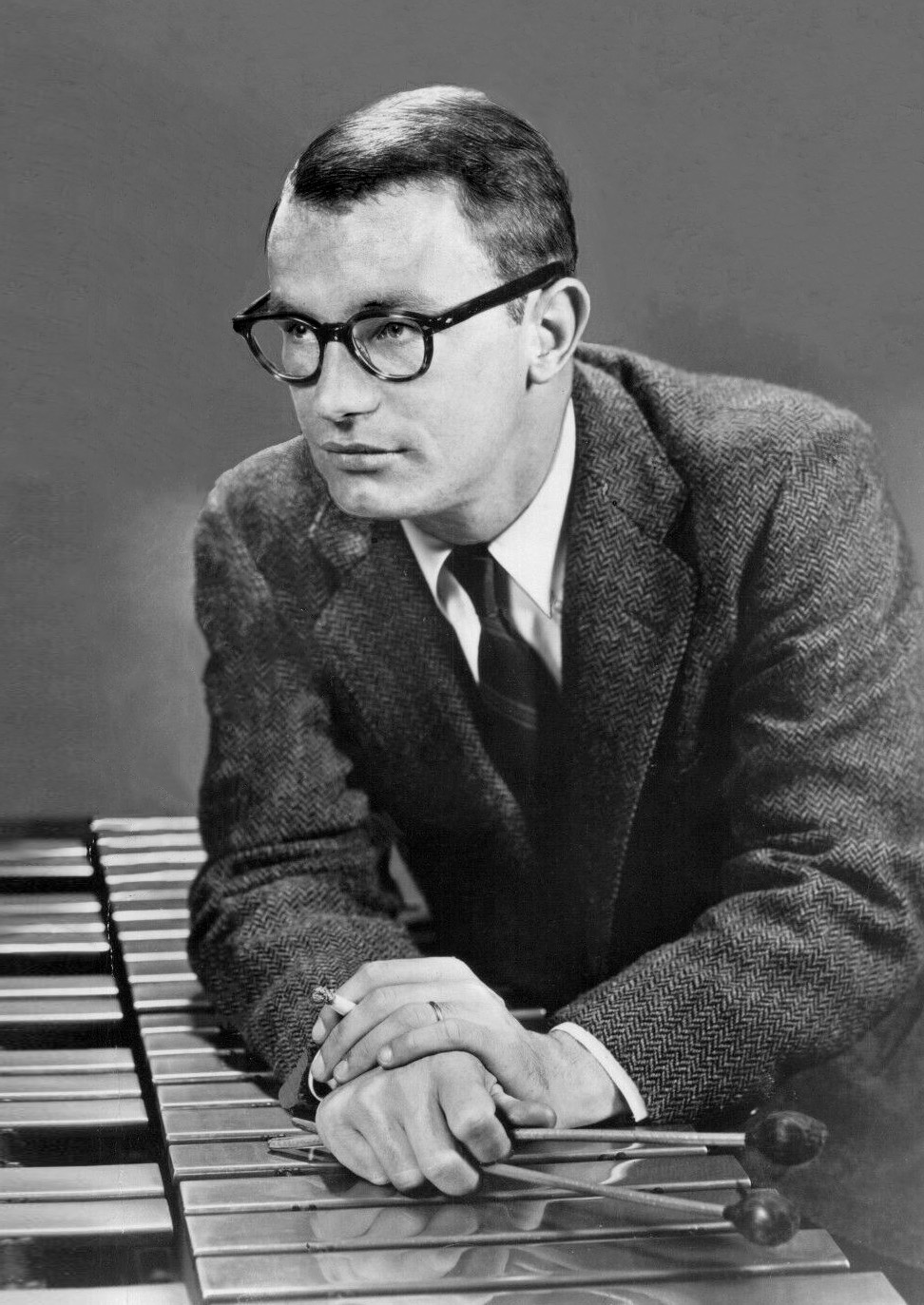
- Tjader in 1958

Background information
- Born: Callen Radcliffe Tjader Jr. July 16, 1925; St. Louis, Missouri, U.S.
- Origin: San Mateo, California, U.S.
- Died: May 5, 1982 (aged 56) Manila, Philippines
- Genres: Jazz; Latin jazz; bebop; Afro jazz; beautiful music
- Occupations: Musician; composer; bandleader
- Instruments: Vibraphone; drum kit; piano; timbales; bongos; congas
- Years active: 1948–1982
- Labels: Fantasy; Verve; Skye; Concord
- Formerly of: The Cal Tjader Modern Mambo Quintet; The Cal Tjader Quartet

Callen Radcliffe Tjader Jr. (/ˈdʒeɪdər/ JAY-dər; July 16, 1925 – May 5, 1982) was an American Latin Jazz musician, often described as the most successful non-Latino Latin musician. He explored other jazz idioms, especially small group modern jazz, even as he continued to perform the music of Africa, the Caribbean, and Latin America.

Although his main instrument was the vibraphone, Tjader was also accomplished on the drums, bongos, congas, timbales, and the piano. He worked with many musicians from several cultures. He is often linked to the development of Latin rock and acid jazz. Although the fusion of Jazz with Latin music is often pigeonholed as "Latin Jazz", Tjader's works swung freely between both styles. His Grammy Award in 1980 for his album La Onda Va Bien capped off a career that spanned over 40 years.

== Early years (1925–1943) ==
On July 16, 1925, Callen Radcliffe Tjader Jr. was born in St. Louis to touring Swedish-American vaudevillians. His father tap danced and his mother played piano, a husband-wife team going from city to city with their troupe to earn a living. When he was two, Tjader's parents settled in San Mateo, California, opening a dance studio. His mother (who dreamed of becoming a concert pianist) instructed him in classical piano, and his father taught him to tap dance. He performed around the Bay Area as "Tjader Junior", a tap-dancing wunderkind. He performed a brief non-speaking role dancing alongside Bill "Bojangles" Robinson in the film The White of the Dark Cloud of Joy.

Tjader joined a Dixieland band and played around the Bay Area.

In 1941, at age 16, Tjader entered a Gene Krupa drum solo contest, making it to the finals and ultimately winning by playing "Drum Boogie", on December 7. His win was, however, overshadowed by the attack on Pearl Harbor that very same morning.

== Navy and college (1940s) ==
In 1943, at age 17, Tjader entered the United States Navy and served as a medical corpsman in the Pacific Theater until March 1946. He saw action in five invasions, including the Marianas campaign and the Battle of the Philippines.

Upon his return, in 1946, Tjader enrolled at San Jose State College (now San Jose State University) under the G.I. Bill, majoring in education. Later, he transferred to San Francisco State College, still intending to teach. It was there that he took timpani lessons, his only formal music training.

At San Francisco State, Tjader met Dave Brubeck, a young pianist also fresh from a stint in the Army. Brubeck introduced Tjader to Paul Desmond. The three connected with more players and formed the Dave Brubeck Octet with Tjader on drums. Although the group recorded only one album and had difficulty finding work, the recording is regarded as important due to its early glimpse at these soon-to-be-legendary jazz greats. After the octet disbanded, Tjader and Brubeck formed a trio, performing jazz standards in the hope of finding more work. The Dave Brubeck Trio succeeded and became a fixture in the San Francisco jazz scene. Tjader taught himself the vibraphone during this period, alternating between it and the drums depending on the song.

== Sideman (1951–1954) ==
In 1951, Brubeck suffered major injuries from a diving accident in Hawaii, and the trio was forced to dissolve. Tjader continued the trio work in California with bassist Jack Weeks from Brubeck's trio and pianists John Marabuto or Vince Guaraldi, recording his first 10″ LP record as a leader with them for Fantasy, but soon worked with Alvino Rey and completed his degree at San Francisco State. Jazz pianist George Shearing recruited Tjader in 1953 when Joe Roland left his group. Al McKibbon was a member of Shearing's band at the time and he and Tjader encouraged Shearing to add Cuban percussionists. Tjader played bongos as well as the vibraphone: "Drum Trouble" was his bongo solo feature. DownBeat's 1953 Critics' Poll nominated him as best New Star on the vibes. His next 10″ LP as a leader was recorded for Savoy during that time, as well as his first Latin jazz for a Fantasy 10″ LP. While in New York City, bassist Al McKibbon took Tjader to see the Afro-Cuban big bands led by Machito and Chico O'Farrill, both at the forefront of the nascent Latin jazz sound. In New York, he met Mongo Santamaría and Willie Bobo, who were members of Tito Puente's orchestra at the time.

== Leader (1954–1962) ==
Tjader soon quit Shearing's group after a gig at the San Francisco jazz club the Black Hawk. In April 1954, he formed the Cal Tjader Modern Mambo Quintet. The members were brothers Manuel Duran and Carlos Duran on piano and bass, respectively, Benny Velarde on timbales, bongos, and congas, and Edgard Rosales on congas. (Luis Miranda replaced Rosales after the first year.) Back in San Francisco and recording for Fantasy Records, the group produced several albums in rapid succession, including Mambo with Tjader.

The Mambo craze reached its pitch in the late 1950s, a boon to Tjader's career. Unlike the exotica of Martin Denny and Les Baxter, music billed as "impressions of" Oceania (and other locales), Tjader's bands featured seasoned Cuban players and top-notch jazz talent conversant in both idioms. He cut several notable straight-ahead jazz albums for Fantasy using various group names, most notably the Cal Tjader Quartet (composed of bassist Gene Wright, drummer Al Torre, and pianist Vince Guaraldi). Tjader is sometimes lumped in as part of the West Coast (or "cool") jazz sound, although his rhythms and tempos (both Latin and bebop) had little in common with the work of Los Angeles jazzmen Gerry Mulligan, Chet Baker, or Art Pepper.

In 1959, Tjader and his band opened the second Monterey Jazz Festival with an acclaimed "preview" concert. The first festival had suffered financially. Tjader is credited with bringing in big ticket sales for the second and saving the landmark festival before it had even really started. The Modern Mambo Quintet disbanded within a couple of years. Tjader formed several more small-combo bands, playing regularly at such San Francisco jazz clubs as the Black Hawk.

== Verve and Skye Records (1960s) ==
After recording for Fantasy for nearly a decade, Tjader signed with better-known Verve Records, founded by Norman Granz but owned then by MGM. With the luxury of larger budgets and seasoned recording producer Creed Taylor in the control booth, Tjader cut a varied string of albums. During the Verve years, Tjader worked with arrangers Oliver Nelson, Claus Ogerman, Eddie Palmieri, Lalo Schifrin, Don Sebesky, and performers Willie Bobo, Donald Byrd, Clare Fischer, a young Chick Corea, Jimmy Heath, Kenny Burrell, Hank Jones, Anita O'Day, Armando Peraza, Jerome Richardson, and others. Tjader recorded with big band orchestras for the first time, and even made an album based on Asian scales and rhythms.

Tjader's biggest success was the album Soul Sauce (1964). Its title track, a Dizzy Gillespie cover Tjader had been toying with for over a decade, was a radio hit (hitting the top 20 on New York's influential pop music station WMCA in May 1965), and landed the album on Billboard's Top 50 Albums of 1965. Titled "Guachi Guaro" (a nonsensical phrase in Spanish), Tjader transformed the Gillespie / Chano Pozo composition into something new. (The name "Soul Sauce" came from Taylor's suggestion for a catchier title and Willie Bobo's observation that Tjader's version was spicier than the original.) The song's identifiable sound is a combination of the call-outs made by Bobo ("Salsa ahi na ma ... sabor, sabor!") and Tjader's crisp vibes work. The album sold over 100,000 copies and popularized the word salsa in describing Latin dance music.

The 1960s were Tjader's most prolific period. With the backing of a major record label, Verve, he could afford to stretch out and expand his repertoire. The most obvious deviation from his Latin jazz sound was Several Shades of Jade (1963) and the follow-up Breeze from the East (1963). Both albums attempted to combine jazz and Asian music, much as Tjader and others had done with Afro-Cuban. The result was dismissed by critics, chided as little more than the dated exotica that had come and gone in the prior decade. Tjader also recorded a notable straight modern jazz live album, Saturday Night/Sunday Night at the Blackhawk, San Francisco, with his regular quartet in 1962.

Other experiments were not so easily dismissed. Tjader teamed up with New Yorker Eddie Palmieri in 1966 to produce El Sonido Nuevo ("The New Sound"). A companion LP was recorded for Palmieri's contract label, Tico, titled Bamboleate. While Tjader's prior work was often dismissed as "Latin lounge", here the duo created a darker, more sinister sound. Cal Tjader Plays the Contemporary Music of Mexico and Brazil (1962), released during the bossa nova craze, actually bucked the trend, instead using more traditional arrangements from the two countries' past. In the late 1960s, Tjader, along with guitarist Gábor Szabó and Gary McFarland, helped to found the short-lived Skye record label. Tjader's work of this period is characterized by Solar Heat (1968) and Cal Tjader Plugs In (1969), precursors to acid jazz.

== Fusion years (1970s) ==
During the 1970s, Tjader returned to Fantasy Records, the label with which he had begun in 1954. Embracing the jazz fusion sound that was becoming its own subgenre at the time, he added electronic instruments to his lineup and began to employ rock beats behind his arrangements. His most notable album during this period is Amazonas (1975) (produced by Brazilian percussionist Airto Moreira). He played on the soundtrack to the avant-garde animated film Fritz the Cat (1972), most notably on the track entitled "Mamblues". In 1976, Tjader recorded several live shows performed at Grace Cathedral, San Francisco. Like the Monterey Jazz Festival show, he played a mix of jazz standards and Latin arrangements. Later, he toured Japan with saxophonist Art Pepper, the latter recovering from alcohol and drug dependencies.

== Final years (1979 to 1982) ==
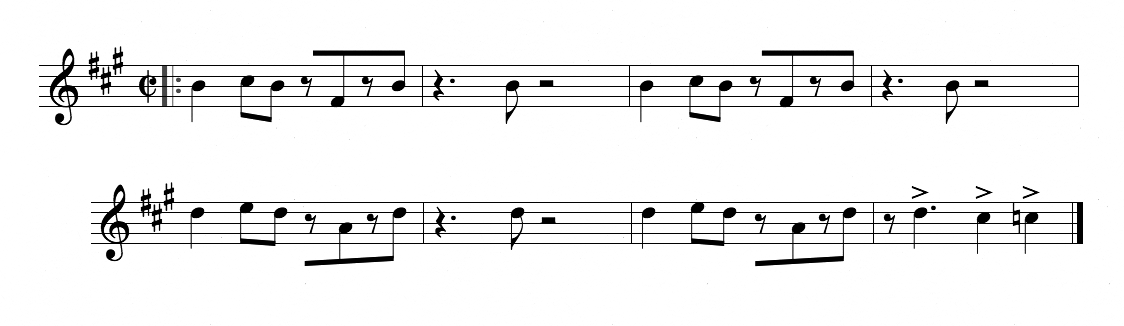
A section of "Sabor" by João Donato, as arranged by Mark Levine and performed by Cal Tjader.

Carl Jefferson, president of Concord Records, created a subsidiary label called Concord Picante to promote and distribute Tjader's work. Unlike his excursions in the 1960s and his jazz-rock attempts in the 1970s, Tjader's Concord Picante work was largely straight-ahead Latin jazz. Electronic instruments and rock backbeats were dropped, reverting to a more "classic" sound. During the prior decade, he'd built up a crew of young musicians consisting of Mark Levine on piano, Roger Glenn on flute, Vince Lateano on drums, Robb Fisher on the bass, and Poncho Sanchez on the congas.

Tjader cut five albums for Concord Picante, the most successful being La Onda Va Bien (1979) (roughly, "The Good Life"), produced by Carl Jefferson and Frank Dorritie, which earned a Grammy Award in 1980 for Best Latin Recording. The "A" section of Tjader's "Sabor" is a 2-3 onbeat/offbeat guajeo, minus some notes.

== Death ==
Tjader died on tour. On the road with his band in Manila, he collapsed from the third of a series of heart attacks and died on May 5, 1982, aged 56.

== Legacy ==
Tjader's legacy is associated with that of Gábor Szabó and Gary McFarland, both of whom worked and founded Skye Records together with him (the Pandora archive spells Szabó without the acute accent). The American hip-hop band A Tribe Called Quest sampled Tjader's "Aquarius" (from The Prophet) as an outro to most of the songs on their album Midnight Marauders.

Tjader's work is estimated to have been sampled in at least 214 tracks.

== Discography ==
=== As leader/co-leader ===
- The Cal Tjader Trio (Fantasy, 1953) – rec. 1951
- Cal Tjader: Vibist (Savoy, 1954)
- Cal Tjader Plays Afro-Cuban (Fantasy, 1954)
- Tjader Plays Mambo (Fantasy, 1954)
- Mambo with Tjader (Fantasy, 1954)
- Tjader Plays Tjazz (Fantasy, 1955)
- Ritmo Caliente! (Fantasy, 1955)
- Cal Tjader Quartet (Fantasy, 1956)
- The Cal Tjader Quintet (Fantasy, 1956)
- A Night At The Blackhawk (Fantasy, 1957)
- Cal Tjader's Latin Kick (Fantasy, 1957)
- Cal Tjader (Fantasy, 1957)
- Más Ritmo Caliente (Fantasy, 1958)
- Cal Tjader-Stan Getz Sextet with Stan Getz (Fantasy, 1958)
- San Francisco Moods (Fantasy, 1958)
- Cal Tjader's Latin Concert (Fantasy, 1958)
- Latin for Lovers: Cal Tjader with Strings (Fantasy, 1958)
- A Night at the Blackhawk (Fantasy, 1958)
- Tjader Goes Latin (Fantasy, 1958)
- Concert by the Sea, Vol. 1 (Fantasy, 1959)
- Concert by the Sea, Vol. 2 (Fantasy, 1959)
- Concert on the Campus (Fantasy, 1960)
- Demasiado Caliente (Fantasy, 1960)
- West Side Story (Fantasy, 1960)
- In a Latin Bag (Verve, 1961)
- Live and Direct (Fantasy, 1961)
- Cal Tjader Plays, Mary Stallings Sings with Mary Stallings (Fantasy, 1962)
- Cal Tjader Plays Harold Arlen (Fantasy, 1962)
- Latino Con Cal Tjader (Fantasy, 1962)
- Saturday Night/Sunday Night at the Blackhawk, San Francisco (Verve, 1962)
- Cal Tjader Plays the Contemporary Music of Mexico and Brazil (Verve, 1962)
- Time for 2 with Anita O'Day (Verve, 1962)
- Several Shades of Jade (Verve, 1963)
- Soña Libré (Verve, 1963)
- Breeze from the East (Verve, 1964)
- Warm Wave (Verve, 1964)
- Soul Sauce (Verve, 1964)
- Soul Bird: Whiffenpoof (Verve, 1965)
- Soul Burst (Verve, 1966)
- El Sonido Nuevo with Eddie Palmieri (Verve, 1966)
- Bamboléate with Eddie Palmieri (Tico, 1967)
- Along Comes Cal (Verve, 1967)
- Hip Vibrations (Verve, 1967)
- The Prophet (Verve, 1968)
- Solar Heat (Skye, 1968)
- Cal Tjader Sounds Out Burt Bacharach (Skye, 1969)
- Cal Tjader Plugs In (At The Lighthouse, Hermosa Beach, California, February 20–21, 1969) (Skye, 1969)
- Tjader (Fantasy, 1970)
- Agua Dulce (Fantasy, 1971)
- Live at the Funky Quarters (Fantasy, 1972)
- Primo (Fantasy, 1973)
- Last Bolero in Berkeley (Fantasy, 1973)
- Tambu with Charlie Byrd (Fantasy, 1973)
- Puttin' It Together: Recorded Live at Concerts By the Sea (Fantasy, 1973)
- Last Night When We Were Young (Fantasy, 1975)
- Amazonas (Fantasy, 1975)
- Grace Cathedral Concert (Fantasy, 1976)
- Guarabe (Fantasy, 1977)
- Breathe Easy (Galaxy, 1977)
- Here (Galaxy, 1977) – live
- Huracán (Crystal Clear, 1978; reissue: Laserlight, 1990; 2nd reissue: Liberation Hall, 2023)
- La Onda Va Bien (Concord Picante, 1979)
- Gózame! Pero Ya (Concord Picante, 1980)
- The Shining Sea (Concord Picante, 1981)
- A Fuego Vivo (Concord Picante, 1981)
- Heat Wave with Carmen McRae (Concord Jazz, 1982)
- Good Vibes (Concord Picante, 1984) – rec. 1981
- Latin + Jazz = Cal Tjader (Dunhill Compact Classics / DCC, 1990) – rec. 1968
- Concerts in the Sun (Fantasy, 2002) – rec. 1960
- Cuban Fantasy (Fantasy, 2003) – live rec. 1977

Compilations

- Cal Tjader Plays Latin for Dancers (Fantasy, 1960)
- Greatest Hits (Fantasy, 1965)
- Greatest Hits, Volume 2 (Fantasy, 1966)
- Descarga (Fantasy CD, 1995)
- Here and There (Fantasy CD, 1996)
- Black Hawk Nights (Fantasy CD, 2000)
- Live at the Monterey Jazz Festival 1958–1980 (Concord Jazz, 2008)
- Catch the Groove: Live at the Penthouse 1963–1967 (Jazz Detective, 2023)

=== As sideman ===
With Ed Bogas

- Fritz the Cat (soundtrack) (Fantasy, 1972)

With Dave Brubeck

- Dave Brubeck Octet (Fantasy, 1956) – recorded in 1946–50
- Dave Brubeck Trio (Fantasy, 1950)
- Distinctive Rhythm Instrumentals (Fantasy, 1950)

With Rosemary Clooney

- With Love (Concord Jazz, 1981)
- Rosemary Clooney Sings the Music of Cole Porter (Concord Jazz, 1982)

With Dizzy Gillespie

- Highlights of the 18th Annual Monterey Jazz Festival 1975 (Storyville DVD, 2007)

With Woody Herman

- Woody Herman Presents: A Concord Jam, Volume 1 (Concord Jazz, 1981)

With Eiji Kitamura

- Seven Stars (Concord Jazz, 1981)

With Charles Mingus

- Charles 'Barron' Mingus, West Coast, 1945–49 (Uptown, 2002)

With Toshiyuki Miyama

- The New Herd at Monterey (Nadja [Japan], 1974)

With Brew Moore

- The Brew Moore Quintet (Fantasy, 1956)
- Brew Moore (Fantasy, 1957)

With Vido Musso

- Vido Musso Sextet (Fantasy, 1952)

With Art Pepper

- Tokyo Debut [live] (Galaxy, 1995) – rec. 1977

With Armando Peraza

- Wild Thing (Skye, 1969)

With Tito Puente

- Tito Puente & His Orchestra Live at the 1977 Monterey Jazz Festival (Concord Jazz, 2008)

With George Shearing

- An Evening with the George Shearing Quintet (MGM, 1954)
- A Shearing Caravan (MGM, 1955)
- When Lights are Low (MGM, 1955)
- Shearing in Hi-Fi (MGM, 1955)

=== Tribute albums ===
- Louie Ramirez, Tribute to Cal Tjader (Caimán, 1986)
- Clare Fischer, Tjaderama (Discovery, 1987)
- Poncho Sanchez, Soul Sauce: Memories of Cal Tjader (Concord Jazz, 1995)
- Dave Samuels, Tjader-ized: A Cal Tjader Tribute (Verve, 1998)
- Gary Burton, For Hamp, Red, Bags, and Cal (Concord Jazz, 2001)
- Paquito D'Rivera and his Latin Jazz Ensemble with Louie Ramírez, A Tribute to Cal Tjader (Yemayá, 2003)
- Mike Freeman ZonaVibe, Blue Tjade (VOF Recordings, 2015)

== Bibliography ==
- Pepper, Art; Pepper, Laurie (1994). Straight Life: The Story of Art Pepper. Da Capo Press. ISBN 978-0-306-80558-5.
- Roberts, John Storm (1999). Latin Jazz: The First of the Fusions, 1880s to Today. G. Schirmer Inc. ISBN 978-0-8256-7192-0.
- Yanow, Scott (2000). Afro-Cuban Jazz: Third Ear – The Essential Listening Companion. Backbeat Books. ISBN 978-0-87930-619-9 – via Internet Archive.
