= Norgran Records =

American jazz record label

- Founded: 1953
- Founder: Norman Granz
- Status: Defunct
- Genre: Jazz
- Country of origin: U.S.

Norgran Records was an American jazz record label in Los Angeles founded by Norman Granz in 1953. It became part of Verve Records, which Granz created in 1956. It is the first letters of Granz's full name.

== Discography ==
=== 10 inch LP series ===
Catalog No.	Year	Artist	Album	Notes
MGN 1	1954	Johnny Hodges	Swing with Johnny Hodges	
MGN 2	1954	Dizzy Gillespie and Stan Getz	The Dizzy Gillespie-Stan Getz Sextet	
MGN 3	1954	Buddy DeFranco	The Music of Buddy DeFranco	
MGN 4	1954	Al Hibbler	Al Hibbler Favorites	
MGN 5	1954	Lester Young	Lester Young with the Oscar Peterson Trio #2	
MGN 6	1954	Lester Young	Lester Young with the Oscar Peterson Trio #1	
MGN 7	1954	Louis Bellson	The Amazing Artistry of Louis Bellson	
MGN 8	1954	Charlie Ventura	The Charlie Ventura Quartet	
MGN 9	1954	Chico O'Farrill	The Second Afro-Cuban Jazz Suite	
MGN 10	1954	Benny Carter	The Urbane Mr. Carter	
MGN 11	1954	Bernard Peiffer	Bernard Peiffer et Son Trio	
MGN 12	1954	Don Byas	Don Byas et Ses Rythmes	
MGN 13	1954	Slim Gaillard	Slim Gaillard and His Musical Aggregation	
MGN 14	1954	Louis Bellson	The Exciting Mr. Bellson and His Big Band	
MGN 15	1954	Al Hibbler	Al Hibbler Sings Duke Ellington	
MGN 16	1954	Buddy DeFranco	Pretty Moods by Buddy DeFranco	
MGN 18	1954	Dizzy Gillespie	More of the Dizzy Gillespie-Stan Getz Sextet #2	
MGN 19	1954	Tal Farlow	The Tal Farlow Album	
MGN 20	1954	Charlie Ventura and Mary Ann McCall	An Evening with Charlie Ventura with Mary Ann McCall	
MGN 21	1954	Benny Carter	The Formidable Benny Carter	
MGN 22	1954	Toshiko Akiyoshi	Toshiko's Piano	
MGN 23	1954	Bud Powell	The Artistry of Bud Powell	
MGN 24	1954	George Wallington	The Workshop of the George Wallington Trio	
MGN 25	1954	The Six	The Six	
MGN 26	1954	Buddy Rich	The Swinging Buddy Rich	
MGN 27	1954	Chico O'Farrill	Mambo Dance Session	
MGN 28	1954	Chico O'Farrill	Latino Dance Session	
MGN 29	1954	Kenny Drew	The Ideation of Kenny Drew	
MGN 30	1954	Anita O'Day	Songs by Anita O'Day	
MGN 31		Chico O'Farrill	Chico O'Farrill	
MGN 32	1955	Jack Costanzo	Afro-Cubano Jazz	

=== 12 inch LP series ===
Catalog No.	Year	Artist	Album	Notes
MGN 1000	1954	Stan Getz	Interpretations by the Stan Getz Quintet	
MGN 1001	1954	Ben Webster	The Consummate Artistry of Ben Webster	
MGN 1002	1954	Kenny Drew	Kenny Drew and His Progressive Piano	
MGN 1003	1954	Dizzy Gillespie	Afro	
MGN 1004	1954	Johnny Hodges	Memories of Ellington	
MGN 1005	1954	Lester Young	The President	
MGN 1006	1954	Buddy DeFranco	The Progressive Mr. DeFranco	
MGN 1007	1954	Louis Bellson	Journey Into Love	
MGN 1008	1954	Stan Getz	Interpretations by the Stan Getz Quintet #2	
MGN 1009	1954	Johnny Hodges	More of Johnny Hodges	
MGN 1010	1954	George Wallington	George Wallington with Strings	
MGN 1011	1954	Louis Bellson	Louis Bellson Quintet	
MGN 1012	1954	Buddy DeFranco	Buddy DeFranco and His Clarinet	
MGN 1013	1954	Charlie Ventura and Mary Ann McCall	Another Evening with Charlie Ventura and Mary Ann McCall	
MGN 1014	1955	Tal Farlow	Autumn in New York	
MGN 1015	1955	Benny Carter	Benny Carter Plays Pretty	
MGN 1016	1955	Buddy DeFranco and Oscar Peterson	Buddy DeFranco and Oscar Peterson Play George Gershwin	
MGN 1017	1955	Bud Powell	Jazz Original	
MGN 1018	1955	Ben Webster	Music for Loving	
MGN 1019	1955	Teddy Wilson	The Creative Teddy Wilson	
MGN 1020	1955	Louis Bellson	The Driving Louis Bellson	
MGN 1021	1955	Various Artists	Our Best	
MGN 1022	1955	Lester Young	It Don't Mean a Thing	
MGN 1023	1955	Dizzy Gillespie	Dizzy and Strings	
MGN 1024	1955	Johnny Hodges	Dance Bash	
MGN 1025	N/A	Benny Carter	(not released)	
MGN 1026	1955	Buddy DeFranco	Buddy DeFranco Quartet	Reissued as Mr. Clarinet with one additional track
MGN 1027	1955	Tal Farlow	The Interpretations of Tal Farlow	
MGN 1028	1955	Ralph Burns	Ralph Burns Among the JATP's	
MGN 1029	1955	Stan Getz	Interpretations by the Stan Getz Quintet #3	
MGN 1030	1955	Tal Farlow	A Recital by Tal Farlow	
MGN 1031	1955	Buddy Rich	Sing and Swing with Buddy Rich	
MGN 1032	1955	Stan Getz	West Coast Jazz	
MGN 1033	1955	Various Artists	Swing Guitars	
MGN 1034	1955	Various Artists	Tenor Saxes	
MGN 1035	1955	Various Artists	Alto Saxes	
MGN 1036	1955	Various Artists	Piano Interpretations	
MGN 1037	1955	Lionel Hampton and Stan Getz	Hamp and Getz	
MGN 1038	1955	Buddy Rich and Harry Edison	Buddy and Sweets	
MGN 1039	1955	Ben Webster	Music with Feeling	
MGN 1040		John Lewis	The Modern Jazz Society Presents a Concert of Contemporary Music	
MGN 1041	1955	Charlie Ventura	Charlie Ventura's Carnegie Hall Concert	
MGN 1042	1955	Stan Getz	Stan Getz Plays	Reissue of Clef Records MGC 137 with additional selections from MGC 143
MGN 1043	1955	Lester Young and Harry Edison	Pres and Sweets	
MGN 1044	1955	Benny Carter	New Jazz Sounds	
MGN 1045	1955	Johnny Hodges	Creamy	
MGN 1046	1955	Louis Bellson	Skin Deep	
MGN 1047	1955	Tal Farlow	The Tal Farlow Album	
MGN 1048	1955	Johnny Hodges	Castle Rock	
MGN 1049	1955	Anita O'Day	Anita O'Day Sings Jazz	
MGN 1050	1955	Dizzy Gillespie and Stan Getz	Diz and Getz	
MGN 1051	N/A	Teddy Wilson	Intimate Listening	(not released)
MGN 1052	1955	Buddy Rich	The Swinging Buddy Rich	
MGN 1053	1956	Mary Ann McCall and Charlie Ventura	An Evening with Mary Ann McCall and Charlie Ventura	
MGN 1054	1956	Lester Young and Oscar Peterson	The Pres-ident Plays with the Oscar Peterson Trio	
MGN 1055	1956	Johnny Hodges	Ellingtonia '56	
MGN 1056	1956	Lester Young, Roy Eldridge, Vic Dickenson, Teddy Wilson, Freddie Greene, Gene Ramey, Jo Jones	The Jazz Giants '56	
MGN 1057	1956	Anita O'Day	An Evening with Anita O'Day	
MGN 1058	1956	Benny Carter and His Strings with the Oscar Peterson Quartet	Alone Together	Reissue of MGN 21 with additional tracks
MGN 1059	1956	Johnny Hodges	In a Tender Mood	
MGN 1060	1956	Johnny Hodges	Used to Be Duke	
MGN 1061	1956	Johnny Hodges	The Blues	
MGN 1062	1956	Bill Harris	The Bill Harris Herd	
MGN 1063	1956	Bud Powell	Jazz Giant	
MGN 1064	1956	Bud Powell	Bud Powell's Moods	
MGN 1065	1956	The Six / Sonny Criss / Tommy Turk	An Evening of Jazz	
MGN 1066	1956	Kenny Drew	The Modernity of Kenny Drew	Reissue of MGN 1002
MGN 1067	1956	Jack Costanzo / Andre's All Stars	Afro-Cubano	split album
MGN 1068	1956	Buddy DeFranco	Jazz Tones	
MGN 1069	1956	Buddy DeFranco	Mr. Clarinet	Reissue of MGN 1026
MGN 1070	1956	Benny Carter	Cosmopolite	
MGN 1071	1956	Lester Young	Lester's Here	
MGN 1072	1956	Lester Young	Pres	
MGN 1073	1956	Charlie Ventura	In a Jazz Mood	
MGN 1074	1956	Lester Young and Buddy Rich	The Lester Young Buddy Rich Trio	
MGN 1075	1956	Charlie Ventura	Blue Saxophone	
MGN 1076	1956	Dizzy Gillespie, Sonny Stitt, John Lewis, Percy Heath, Skeeter Best & Charlie Persip	The Modern Jazz Sextet	
MGN 1077	1956	Bud Powell	Piano Interpretations by Bud Powell	
MGN 1078	1956	Buddy Rich	The Wailing Buddy Rich	
MGN 1079	1956	Buddy DeFranco	In a Mellow Mood	
MGN 1080	1956	Lionel Hampton	Lionel Hampton's Jazz Giants	
MGN 1081	1956	Herb Ellis	Ellis in Wonderland	
MGN 1082	1956	Billy Bauer	Billy Bauer Plectrist	
MGN 1083	1956	Dizzy Gillespie	Jazz Recital	
MGN 1084	1956	Dizzy Gillespie	World Statesman	
MGN 1085	1956	Buddy DeFranco	The Buddy DeFranco Wailers	
MGN 1086	1956	Buddy Rich	This One's for Basie	
MGN 1087	N/A	Stan Getz	Stan Getz '56	unreleased?
MGN 1088	1956	Stan Getz	More West Coast Jazz with Stan Getz	
MGN 1089		Ben Webster	King of the Tenors	Reissue of MGN 1001
MGN 1090	1956	Dizzy Gillespie	Diz Big Band	Reissue of MGN 1023
MGN 1091	1956	Johnny Hodges	Perdido	Reissue of MGN 1024
MGN 1092	1956	Johnny Hodges	In a Mellow Tone	Reissue of MGN 1004
MGN 1093	1956	Lester Young	Lester Swings Again	Reissue of MGN 1005
MGN 1094	1956	Buddy DeFranco	Odalisque	Reissue of MGN 1006
MGN 1095	N/A	Louis Bellson	Concerto for Drums	Reissue of MGN 1011 - not released
MGN 1096		Buddy DeFranco	Autumn Leaves	Reissue of MGN 1012
MGN 1097	1956	Tal Farlow	The Guitar Artistry Of Tal Farlow - Autumn in New York	Reissue of MGN 1014
MGN 1098	1956	Bud Powell	Bud Powell '57	Reissue of MGN 1017
MGN 1099	1956	Louis Bellson	The Hawk Talks	Reissue of MGN 1020
MGN 1100		Lester Young	It Don't Mean a Thing	Reissue of MGN 1022
MGN 1101		Tal Farlow	Fascinating Rhythm	Reissue of MGN 1027
MGN 1102		Tal Farlow	Tal	
MGN 1103		Charlie Ventura	Charley's Parley	
MGN 1104	N/A	Buddy DeFranco	Broadway Showcase	(not released)
MGN 1105	N/A	Ray Brown	Bass Hit!	(not released)
MGN 1106	N/A	Howard Roberts	Mr. Roberts Plays Guitar	(not released)
MGN 2000-2		Stan Getz	Stan Getz at The Shrine	2LP set
MGN 3501-2		Various Artists	Norman Granz Jazz Concert	2LP Set
