= Chubby Jackson =

American jazz bassist and bandleader (1918–2003)

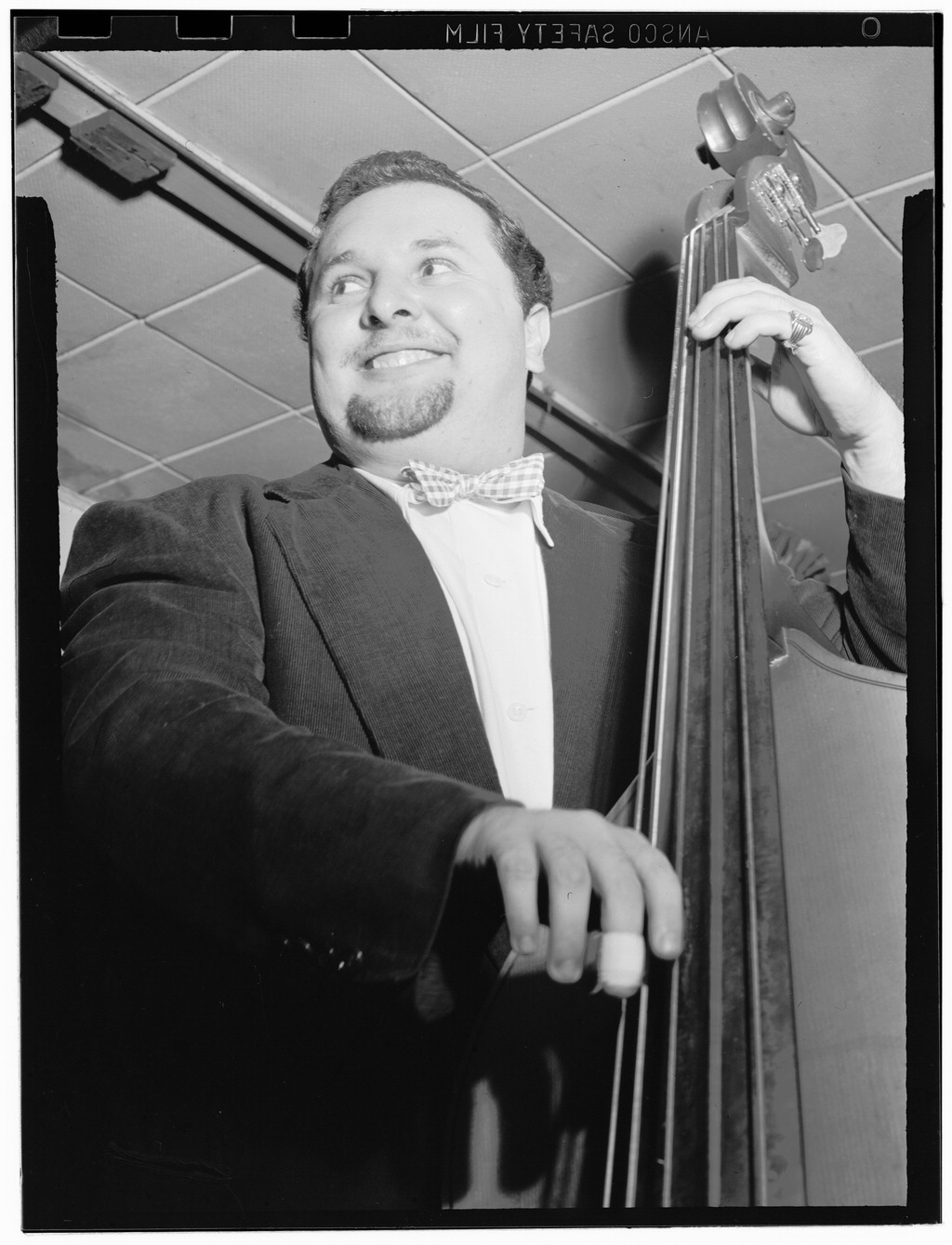
- Jackson at the Onyx Club, New York City, c. July 1947; by William P. Gottlieb

Background information
- Born: Greig Stewart Jackson; October 25, 1918; New York City, New York, U.S.
- Died: October 1, 2003 (aged 84) Rancho Bernardo, San Diego, California, U.S.
- Genres: Jazz
- Occupations: Musician; bandleader
- Instrument: Double bass
- Labels: Prestige; Argo; Everest; Crown
- Formerly of: Woody Herman Herd

Greig Stewart "Chubby" Jackson (October 25, 1918 – October 1, 2003) was an American jazz double bassist and bandleader.

== Biography ==
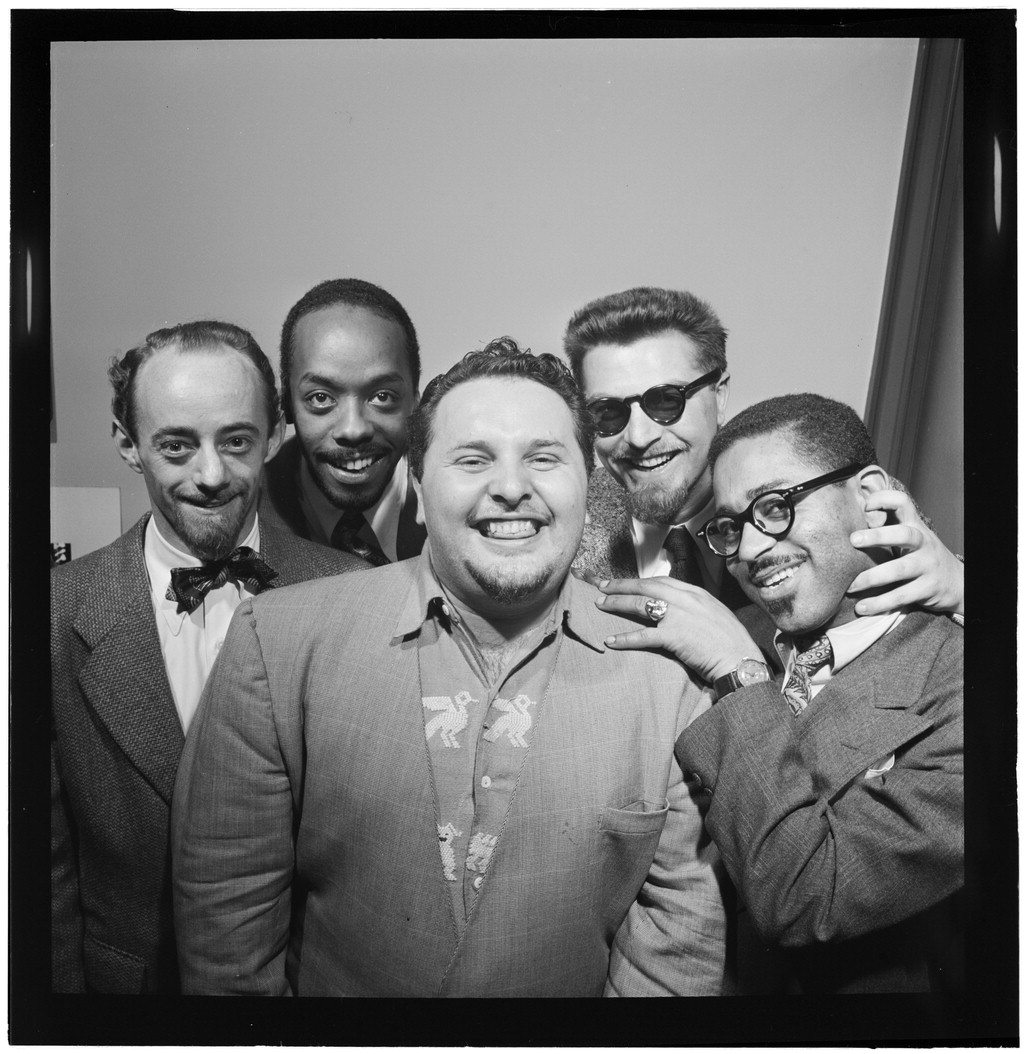
From left: Dave Lambert, John Simmons, Jackson, George Handy, and Dizzy Gillespie; in William P. Gottlieb's office, New York, c. July 1947

Born in New York City, Jackson began at the age of seventeen as a clarinetist, but quickly changed to bass in the mid-1930s.

Jackson performed and/or recorded with Louis Armstrong, Raymond Scott, Jan Savitt, Henry Busse, Charlie Barnet, Oscar Pettiford, Charlie Ventura, Lionel Hampton, Bill Harris, Woody Herman, Gerry Mulligan, and Lennie Tristano, among others. He is perhaps best known for his spirited work both with the Herman bands ("Herds"), and as a leader of his own bands, big and small.

In the 1950s, Jackson worked as a freelance and studio musician and hosted local children's television shows: Chubby Jackson's Little Rascals (March 23, 1959 – July 14, 1961), which aired weekday mornings, and The Chubby Jackson Show (July 22, 1961 – August 5, 1961), airing Saturday afternoons, both on WABC-TV (channel 7) in New York. He hosted his last two children's TV shows for WOR-TV (channel 9) in New York: Space Station Nine, which was seen weekday evenings from January 1, 1962, to January 26, 1962, and he briefly served as the fourth and last emcee of WOR-TV's Looney Tunes Show / The Chubby Jackson Show, weekday afternoons. The last series was aired from January 12, 1962, to June 14, 1962.

In 2000, Jackson was inducted into the Big Band and Jazz Hall of Fame. He died in Rancho Bernardo, San Diego, California, at the age of 84.

== Discography ==
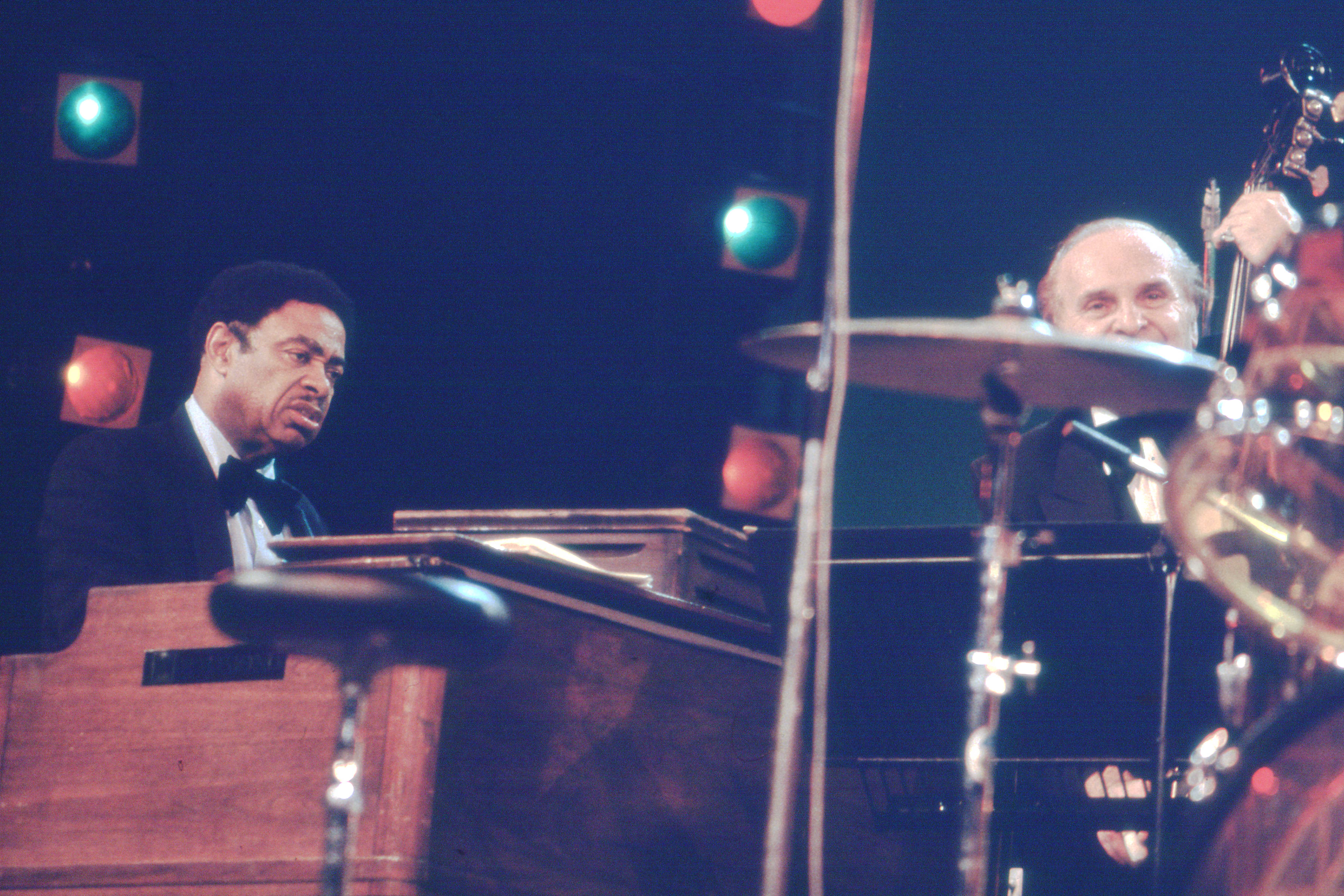
Organist Wild Bill Davis with Jackson, performing at the 1979 North Sea Jazz Festival

=== As leader ===
- Chubby Jackson and his All Star Band (Prestige, 1951)
- Chubby's Back! (Argo, 1957)
- Chubby Takes Over (Everest, 1958)
- I'm Entitled to You!! (Argo, 1958)
- Jazz from Then Till Now (Everest, 1958)
- Chubby Jackson Discovers Maria Marshall (Crown, 1961)

=== As sideman ===
- Louis Armstrong, Town Hall Concert Plus (RCA Victor, 1957)
- Charlie Barnet, Cherokee (Everest, 1958)
- Bill Harris, Bill Harris Herd (Norgran, 1956)
- Woody Herman, The Herd Rides Again (Everest, 1958)
- Woody Herman, Hey! Heard the Herd? (Verve, 1963)
- Woody Herman, The 40th Anniversary Carnegie Hall Concert (RCA Victor, 1977)
- Jackie and Roy, Jackie and Roy (Regent, 1957)
- Marty Napoleon, Marty Napoleon and His Music (Stere-o-Craft, 1958)
- Flip Phillips, A Melody from the Sky (Bob Thiele, 1975)
- Charlie Ventura, Jumping with Ventura (EmArcy, 1955)
- Charlie Ventura, East of Suez (Regent, 1958)
- Ben Webster, Ben and the Boys (Jazz Archives, 1976)
