= Don Abney =

American jazz pianist (1923–2000)

- Born: March 10, 1923; Baltimore, Maryland, U.S.
- Died: January 27, 2000 (aged 76) Los Angeles, California
- Genres: Jazz
- Occupation: Musician
- Instrument: Piano

John Donald Abney (March 10, 1923 – January 27, 2000) was an American jazz pianist.

== Early life ==
Abney was born in Baltimore, Maryland. He studied piano and french horn at the Manhattan School of Music. He joined the United States Army where he played the French horn in the army band and earned the rank of technician fifth grade.

== Later life and career ==
After returning from the army he played in ensembles with Wilbur de Paris, Bill Harris, Kai Winding, Chuck Wayne, Sy Oliver, and Louis Bellson. He had a sustained career as a session musician, playing on recordings for Louis Armstrong, Benny Carter, Oscar Pettiford, Ella Fitzgerald, Carmen McRae, Sarah Vaughan, Eartha Kitt, and Pearl Bailey. He made a number of albums and 7" singles for the Music Minus One label in a rhythm section of jazz royalty including Jimmy Raney, Mundell Lowe, Kenny Clarke and Oscar Pettiford while also playing on many recordings for more minor musicians and on R&B, pop, rock, and doo wop releases.

After moving to Hollywood, he worked as a musical director for Universal Studios/MCA where he appeared as a pianist in the film Pete Kelly's Blues behind Ella Fitzgerald. Additional credits include recording and arrangements for the film Lady Sings the Blues. He toured with Anita O'Day in the 1980s. Early in the 1990s, he moved to Japan and toured there with considerable success, playing weekly at the Sanno Hotel in Tokyo. Upon his return to the United States on January 20, 2000, he died of complications from kidney dialysis in Los Angeles, California. He was interred at Forest Lawn Cemetery, in Burbank, California and is survived by five children.

== Discography ==
=== As sideman ===
With Ella Fitzgerald

- Ella at Zardi's (Verve, 2017)

With Louis Bellson

- Louis Bellson Quintet (Norgran, 1954)
- Drumorama! (Verve, 1957)
- Louis Bellson at The Flamingo (Verve, 1957)

With Benny Carter

- Benny Carter Plays Pretty (Norgran, 1954)
- New Jazz Sounds (Norgran, 1954)
- Moonglow: Love Songs by Benny Carter and his Orchestra (Verve, 1957)

With Harry Edison{

- "Sweets" for the Sweet (Sue, 1964)

With Carmen McRae

- Birds of a Feather (Decca, 1958)
- Book of Ballads (Kapp and London Records, 1959; MCA Japan, 1973)

With Oscar Pettiford

- Another One (Bethlehem, 1955)

With Al Sears

- Rockin' in Rhythm (Swingville, 1960) as The Swingville All-Stars with Taft Jordan and Hilton Jefferson
- Swing's the Thing (Swingsville, 1960)

With Carol Sloane

- As Time Goes By (Four Star, 1990)
