= Zardi =

Zardi is a surname. Notable people with the surname include:

- Dominique Zardi (1930–2009), French actor
- Luciano Zardi (1930–2026), Italian weightlifter

== See also ==
- Lardi
- Zardi's Jazzland
