= West Coast Jazz (Stan Getz album) =

Studio album by Stan Getz
- Released: 1955
- Recorded: August 10–19, 1955
- Studio: Radio Recorders, Hollywood, California
- Genre: Jazz
- Label: Norgran - MG N-1032
- Producer: Norman Granz

Stan Getz chronology
Hamp and Getz (1955)	West Coast Jazz (1955)	Stan Getz and the Cool Sounds (1953-55)

West Coast Jazz is a 1955 album by Stan Getz accompanied by a quartet including trumpeter Conte Candoli. Getz recorded the album in California, where he was filming parts for The Benny Goodman Story, and appearing for a week at the nightclub Zardi's Jazzland. The musicians that accompanied him at Zardi's were chosen by Getz to make this album with him.

The title of the album is an in-joke as Getz was not associated with the West Coast jazz style. The artwork for the album was created by David Stone Martin. The album was reissued in 1996 by Verve Records with bonus tracks.

== Reception ==
Professional ratings
Review scores
Source	Rating
AllMusic	4/5 stars
The Penguin Guide to Jazz Recordings	4/4 stars

Al Campbell reviewed the album for AllMusic and wrote of the musicians that they "connected with Getz immediately, having crossed paths previously... Generally unlike West Coast jazz of the time, the rapid group interplay with energized bop solos, still stand out particularly on 'S-H-I-N-E' and Dizzy Gillespie's 'A Night in Tunisia'". Ted Gioia, in his book West Coast Jazz, writes of the album, "In terms of playing style, Getz meshed well with Manne and the other musicians on the date ... and his playing throughout the album exemplifies the tasteful, inventive creativity that has long been a hallmark of Getz's recordings".

The initial Billboard review from October 15, 1955, wrote that the album had "name power, talent, and a display worthy cover tag this as a leader. The stuff is modern, interesting, and it swings powerfully when its supposed to. For musicians and for fans, this one is tops".

== Track listing ==
1. "East of the Sun (and West of the Moon)" (Brooks Bowman) - 6:17
2. "Four" (Miles Davis) - 7:32
3. "Suddenly It's Spring" (Johnny Burke, Jimmy Van Heusen) - 6:56
4. "A Night in Tunisia" (Dizzy Gillespie, Frank Paparelli) - 6:09
5. "Summertime" (George Gershwin, Ira Gershwin, DuBose Heyward) - 6:04
6. "S-H-I-N-E" (Lew Brown, Ford Dabney, Cecil Mack) - 8:53

Bonus tracks; released on the 1999 Verve CD reissue (Verve 557 549-2)

7. "Split Kick" (Horace Silver) - 7:53
8. "Of Thee I Sing" (G. Gershwin, I. Gershwin) - 4:09 - originally released on Verve MGV 8200
9. "A Handful of Stars" (Jack Lawrence, Ted Shapiro) - 3:20 - originally released on Verve MGV 8200
10. "Love Is Here to Stay" (G. Gershwin, I. Gershwin) - 3:25 - originally released on Verve MGV 8200
11. "Serenade In Blue" (Mack Gordon, Harry Warren) - 3:52 - originally released on Verve MGV 8200
12. "Of Thee I Sing" (Alternative Take) - 4:44
13. "Love Is Here to Stay" (Alternative Take) - 3:30

== Personnel ==
- Stan Getz - tenor saxophone
- Conte Candoli - trumpet tracks 1–7
- Lou Levy - piano
- Leroy Vinnegar - double bass
- Shelly Manne - drums

Production

- David Stone Martin - cover illustration
- Norman Granz - producer
