= Teddy Napoleon =

American jazz musician (1914–1964)

Teddy Napoleon (January 23, 1914 – July 5, 1964) was an American swing jazz pianist. He was the nephew of Phil Napoleon and the older brother of Marty Napoleon.

== Career ==
Napoleon's first professional engagement was with Lee Castle in 1933. He played with Tommy Tompkins for several years before working as a freelance musician in New York. In the 1940s, he played in several big bands, including those of Johnny Messner and Bob Chester, before signing up with Gene Krupa in 1944. He worked under Krupa intermittently for the next fourteen years, including on many of Krupa's big band releases in the 1940s, and in his trio settings with Charlie Ventura. He also spent time working with Flip Phillips, Bill Harris, and Eddie Shu.

Napoleon moved to Florida in 1959 and led his own trio there, though he never recorded as a leader.
