= Stan Getz at The Shrine =

Live album by Stan Getz
- Released: March 1, 1955
- Recorded: November 8, 1954 (#1–8); November 9, 1954 (#9–10)
- Venue: Shrine Auditorium, Los Angeles
- Genre: Jazz
- Length: 70:00
- Label: Norgran Records; MGN 2000-2
- Producer: Norman Granz

Stan Getz chronology
Diz and Getz (1953)	Stan Getz at The Shrine (1955)	Hamp and Getz (1955)

Alternative cover
- Verve CD reissue

Stan Getz at The Shrine is a live jazz album by American saxophonist Stan Getz, recorded in 1954. It was originally released in 1955 on Norgran Records (which would be absorbed by Verve Records in 1956) as a 2-LP set, then reissued on CD by Verve as MGV 8188–2. This was the first concert recording for Stan Getz.

Norman Granz commented: "Last year, 1954, I presented a nationwide concert tour with the Duke Ellington band, the Dave Brubeck Quartet, the Gerry Mulligan Quartet, and the Stan Getz Quintet. On the closing night of the tour I decided to record the Getz portion of the concert, and since the tour closed at the Shrine Auditorium in Los Angeles, it was there that this album was recorded.........As it often happens at these concerts, you can't time them as well as you could a regular recording date, and Stan ran over his allotted time........we had enough material for 1 1/2 albums, and rather than lose the extra half, we have added to the second side of the second LP two compositions: "Feather Merchant" and "We'll Be together Again", which Stan recorded immediately the following night, with virtually the same personnel, the only change being Frank Isola on drums in place of Art Mardigan."

Professional ratings
Review scores
Source	Rating
AllMusic	3/5 stars
The Penguin Guide to Jazz Recordings	4/4 stars

== Track listing ==
1. "Flamingo" – 8:33
2. "Lover Man" – 5:25
3. "Pernod" – 6:48
4. "Tasty Pudding" – 8:21
5. "I'll Remember April" – 7:35
6. "Polka Dots and Moonbeams" – 4:36
7. "Open Country" – 5:46
8. "It Don't Mean a Thing" – 5:57
9. "We'll Be Together Again" – 8:45 – studio track
10. "Feather Merchant" – 8:14 – studio track

== Personnel ==
- Stan Getz – tenor saxophone
- John Williams – piano
- Bill Anthony – bass
- Bob Brookmeyer – valve trombone
- Art Mardigan (#1–8), Frank Isola (#9–10) – drums
