= Diz and Getz =

Studio album by Dizzy Gillespie
- Released: 1955
- Recorded: December 9, 1953 in Radio Recorders, Hollywood, Los Angeles, California
- Genre: Jazz, bebop
- Length: 47:19
- Label: Verve
- Producer: Norman Granz

Dizzy Gillespie chronology
Jazz at Massey Hall (1953)	Diz and Getz (1955)	Afro (1954)

Stan Getz chronology
Interpretations by the Stan Getz Quintet#2 (1953)	Diz and Getz (1953)	Stan Getz at The Shrine (1954)

Professional ratings
Review scores
Source	Rating
AllMusic	4.5/5 stars
The Rolling Stone Jazz Record Guide	4/5 stars
The Penguin Guide to Jazz Recordings	3/4 stars

Diz and Getz is an album by Dizzy Gillespie, featuring Stan Getz.

== Track listing ==
1. "It Don't Mean a Thing (If It Ain't Got That Swing)" (Duke Ellington, Irving Mills) – 6:40
2. "I Let a Song Go Out of My Heart" (Ellington, Mills, Henry Nemo, John Redmond) – 6:19
3. "Exactly Like You" (Dorothy Fields, Jimmy McHugh) – 5:01
4. "It's the Talk of the Town" (Jerry Livingston, Al J. Neiburg, Marty Symes) – 6:55
5. "Impromptu" (Dizzy Gillespie) – 7:50
6. "One Alone" (Gillespie) – 3:04
7. "Girl of My Dreams" (Sunny Clapp) – 3:19
8. "Siboney, Pt. 1" (Ernesto Lecuona, Theodora Morse) – 4:23
9. "Siboney, Pt. 2" – 4:10

== Personnel ==
- Dizzy Gillespie – trumpet
- Stan Getz – tenor saxophone
- Herb Ellis – guitar
- Oscar Peterson – piano
- Ray Brown – double bass
- Max Roach – drums

On track 6 only:

- Dizzy Gillespie – trumpet
- Hank Mobley – tenor saxophone
- Wade Legge – piano
- Lou Hackney – double bass
- Charli Persip – drums
