= The Kennedy Dream =

Studio album by Oliver Nelson
- Released: Mid May 1967
- Recorded: February 16–17, 1967
- Studio: Capitol (New York City)
- Genre: Jazz
- Length: 28:59
- Label: Impulse! AS-9144
- Producer: Bob Thiele

Oliver Nelson chronology
The Spirit of '67 (1967)	The Kennedy Dream (1967)	Live from Los Angeles (1967)

The Kennedy Dream (subtitled A Musical Tribute to John Fitzgerald Kennedy) is an album by American composer/arranger Oliver Nelson recorded in memory of the late U.S. President John F. Kennedy. It was released in 1967 on the Impulse! label.

== Reception ==
The Allmusic review by Michael G. Nastos awarded the album 3½ stars, stating "In February of 1967, Oliver Nelson recognized Kennedy's contributions and assembled a big band to play music in his honor, with taped segments of his speeches as preludes. The result is a heartfelt yet eerie combination, perhaps a bit off-putting, but absolutely relevant decades later. The music is reflective of the changing times as identified by Nelson, ranging from commercial movie score-type music, to soulful or straight-ahead jazz, bop, and the modern big-band sound that the leader, composer, and orchestrator owned... it's a stark reminder of how one man can positively influence the human condition aside from politics and corporate greed, and how another can change his world musically".

Professional ratings
Review scores
Source	Rating
Allmusic	3.5/5 stars

== Track listing ==
All compositions by Oliver Nelson except as indicated

1. "Let the Word Go Forth" - 6:16
2. "A Genuine Peace" - 2:37
3. "The Rights of All" - 3:57
4. "Tolerance" - 3:23
5. "The Artists' Rightful Place" - 3:29
6. "Jacqueline" - 2:15
7. "Day in Dallas" - 3:40
8. "John Kennedy Memory Waltz" (George David Weiss) - 3:22

Recorded on February 16 (#3, 4, 7) and February 17, 1967 (#1, 2, 5, 6, 8).

== Personnel ==
- Oliver Nelson - tenor saxophone, soprano saxophone, arranger, conductor
- Phil Woods - alto saxophone
- Snooky Young - trumpet
- Jerry Dodgion, Jerome Richardson - reeds
- Don Butterfield - tuba
- Phil Bodner - English horn
- Danny Bank - bass clarinet
- Hank Jones - piano, clavinet
- George Duvivier - bass
- Grady Tate - drums
- John F. Kennedy - voice
- Unidentified strings

== See also ==
- Cultural depictions of John F. Kennedy
