= Cosmopolite (album) =

Studio album by Benny Carter
- Released: 1956
- Recorded: December 4, 1952, December 31, 1953, and January 4, 1954
- Studio: Radio Recorders, Los Angeles
- Genre: Jazz
- Label: Norgran
- Producer: Norman Granz

Benny Carter chronology
Alone Together (1952)	Cosmopolite (1956)	Benny Carter Plays Pretty (1954)

The Urbane Mr.Carter Cover

Cosmopolite is an album by American jazz saxophonist Benny Carter recorded at three sessions between 1952 and 1954 and released by Norgran Records. The album features tracks that were released on the 10-inch LP The Urbane Mr. Carter.

== Reception ==
Professional ratings
Review scores
Source	Rating
AllMusic	3/5 stars

Allmusic awarded the album 3 stars, stating that the album "showcases altoist Benny Carter in two very different settings. Side one finds him interpreting ballads in front of a string section while the flip side matches Carter with the Oscar Peterson Trio and drummer J.C. Heard. It is a credit to his versatility and talents that Benny Carter plays quite well in both formats."

== Track listing ==
No.	Title	Length
1.	"Can't We Be Friends?" (Paul James, Kay Swift)	2:38
2.	"Symphony" (Alex Alstone, Jack Lawrence, Andre Tabet)	2:16
3.	"I'm Sorry" (Carter)	3:04
4.	"I'll Be Around" (Alec Wilder)	2:34
5.	"Beautiful Love" (Wayne King, Victor Young, Egbert Van Alstyne)	2:50
6.	"Blue Star" (Carter)	3:08
7.	"Street Scene" (Alfred Newman)	3:17
8.	"Imagination" (Jimmy Van Heusen, Johnny Burke)	3:30
9.	"Pick Yourself Up" (Jerome Kern, Dorothy Fields)	2:31
10.	"I Get a Kick Out of You" (Cole Porter)	2:51
11.	"With a Song in My Heart" (Richard Rodgers, Lorenz Hart)	2:32
12.	"Flamingo" (Ted Grouya, Edmund Anderson)	2:50

Tracks 1–6, 11–12 are included on the original The Urbane Mr. Carter 10" album.

== Personnel ==
- Benny Carter – alto saxophone, arranger
- Oscar Peterson – piano
- Barney Kessel – guitar
- Jack Marshall – guitar
- Ray Brown – double bass
- Red Callender – double bass
- J. C. Heard – drums
- Jackie Mills – drums
- Alvin Stoller – drums
- Hoyt Bohannon – trombone
- Joe Howard – trombone
- Tommy Pederson – trombone
- Juan Tizol – valve trombone
