= Gene Williams (musician) =

American jazz vocalist and bandleader from 1942 until the late 1950s

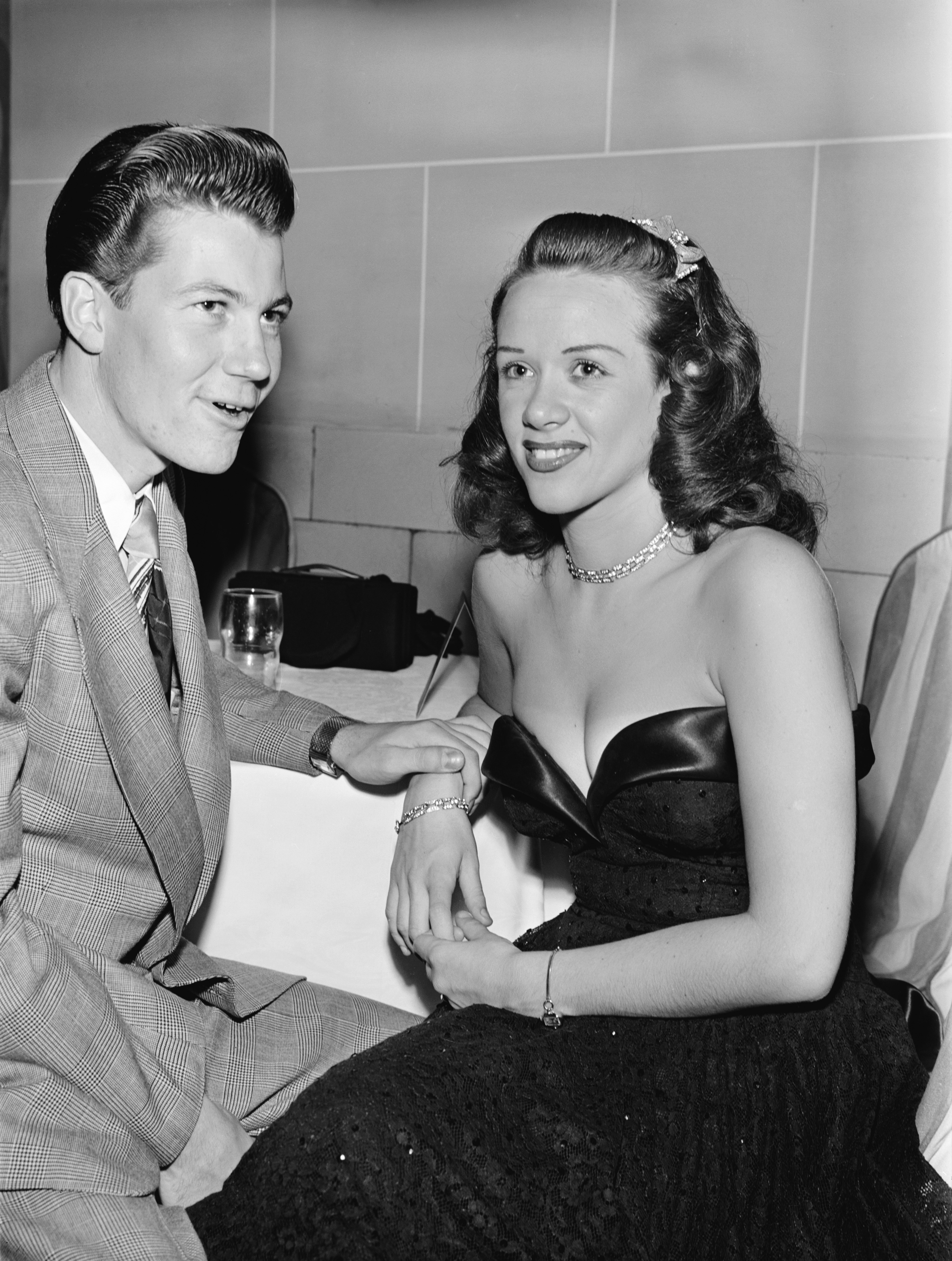
Gene Williams and Fran Warren, October 1947

Eugene Francis Williams (26 February 1926 East Orange, New Jersey – 12 February 1997 Wilton Manors, Florida) was an American jazz vocalist (baritone voice) and bandleader.

== Career ==
Williams began his career in 1942 as a member of the Duke Ambassadors under Sammy Fletcher, then worked in Johnny Long's orchestra while serving in the United States Army. After the war he sang with Vincent Lopez and worked with Les Elgart, George Paxton, and Bobby Sherwood; he also sang on the recording "Sorta Kinda" made by the Claude Thornhill Orchestra in 1947.

=== Gene Williams Orchestra ===
Williams founded his own band, Gene Williams and the Junior Thornhill Band, in New York City in 1949; he later simplified the name to the Gene Williams Orchestra. His sidemen included Stan Getz, Teddy Napoleon, and Mel Zelnick, and featured singers included Adele Castle. Gil Evans, Chico O'Farrill, Hubie Wheeler, and Joe Reisman all arranged for this ensemble. The group played college campuses and took an engagement at the Glen Island Casino in 1952, also recording for Mercury Records.

Barbara Belle (née Belle Einhorn; born 1922) was, in 1950, personal manager for Williams, as well as Louis Prima and Fran Warren. She had also been an investor in William's band. In 1949, Belle had sold her interest in the band to Eddie Fuerst (né Edward Louis Fuerst; 1912–1994), second generation insurance broker and jazz lover who was also an original investor in the Gene Williams Orchestra.

Williams dissolved his orchestra in the late 1950s, but continued to perform with jazz combos.

== Filmography ==
- Hit the Ice (1943); Williams is vocalist with the Johnny Long Orchestra

== Family ==
Williams, on November 9, 1949, married dancer Junior Standish (née Jean Dunne Arthur; 1925–2006) at his apartment in Manhattan. A son was born to their marriage, Robert Williams (born around 1951); but years later, Milton Berle publicly disclosed that he was Robert's biological father. Gene Williams and Junior Standish divorced around 1952, but, after that, dated on-and-off until around 1957. Standish remarried in 1957 to Leonard Forray (1921–2012), an advertising executive, but later divorced him.

Standish legally adopted the name Terry Standish around January 1947 after being selected to perform as dancer in Joe Howard (1867–1961) and Carl Erbe's (ca 1901–1982) new Vanity Fair nightclub (to avoid confusion with the actress Jean Arthur). Because she was young, others called her Junior Standish and the name stuck.
