= Mary McCall =

Mary McCall may refer to:

- Mary Ann McCall (1919–1994), American pop- and jazz singer
- Mary C. McCall Jr. (1904–1986), American screenwriter
