= Bill Harris (trombonist) =

American jazz trombonist (1916–1973)

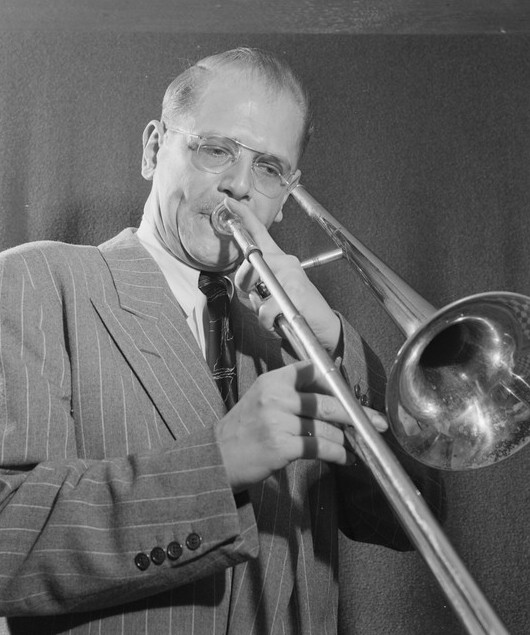
- Bill Harris in 1947, by William P. Gottlieb

Background information
- Born: Willard Palmer Harris; October 28, 1916; Philadelphia, Pennsylvania, U.S.
- Died: August 21, 1973 (aged 56) Hallandale, Florida
- Genres: Jazz
- Occupation: Musician
- Instrument: Trombone
- Years active: 1938–1960s
- Labels: Mercury, EmArcy, Norgran, Dial, Capitol, Verve, Fantasy, Mode
- Formerly of: Woody Herman

Willard Palmer Harris (October 28, 1916 – August 21, 1973) was an American jazz trombonist.

== Biography ==
William Harris was born in Philadelphia, Pennsylvania, United States.

Early in his career, Harris performed with Benny Goodman, Charlie Barnet, and Eddie Condon. He is remembered for his broad, thick tone and quick vibrato that remained for the duration of each tone.

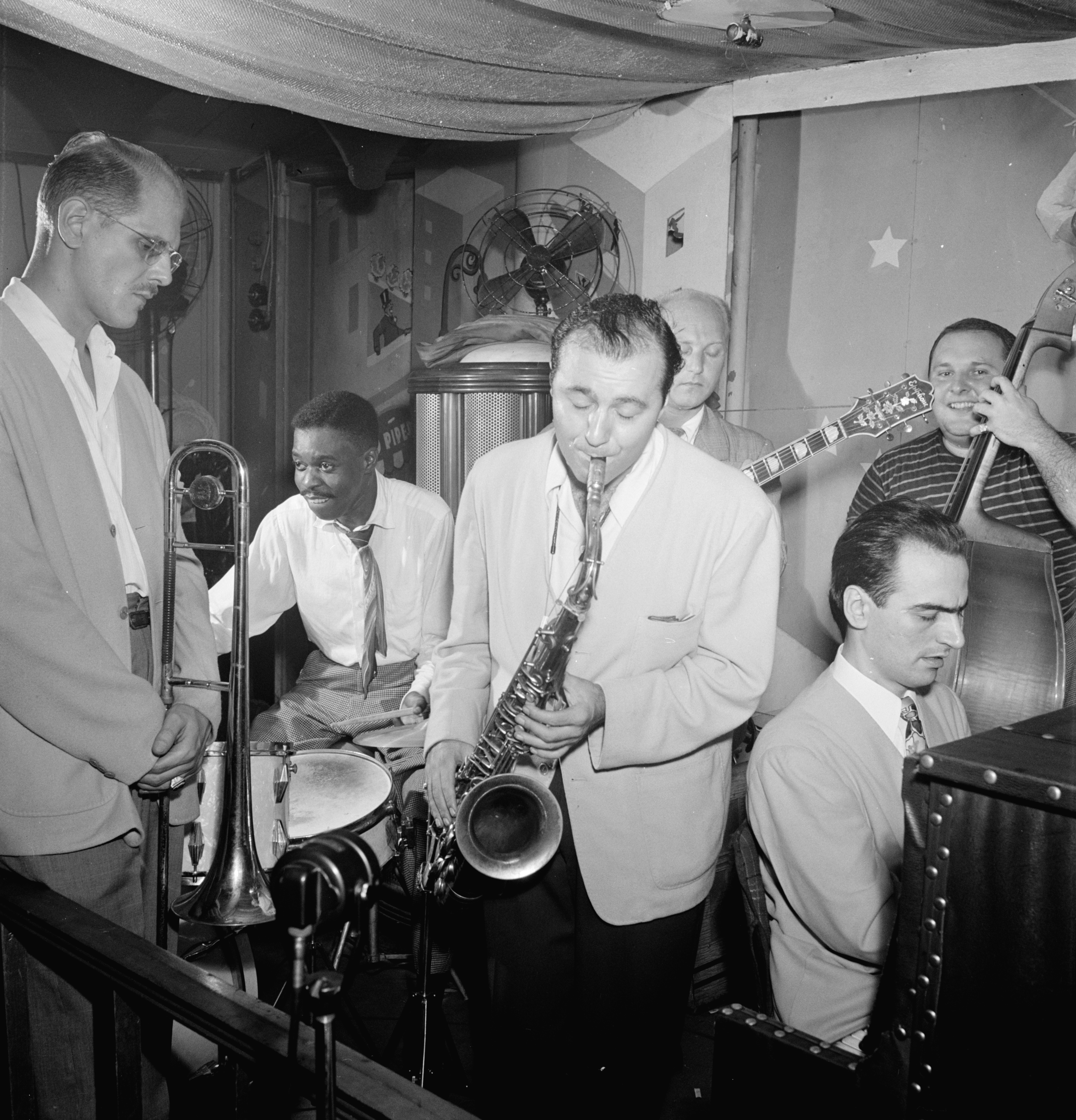
From left: Harris with, Denzil Best, Flip Phillips, Billy Bauer, Lennie Tristano, and Chubby Jackson, at Pied Piper, NYC, 1947

He joined Woody Herman's First Herd in 1944. He was also in the Four Brothers Second Herd during the late 1940s, and he worked with Herman again in the 1950s. He then teamed up with Charlie Ventura and later with Chubby Jackson. Together with Flip Phillips, he became a stalwart of Benny Goodman's group in 1959, although it has been said that Goodman was frequently irritated at Harris because of Harris's indifferent approach to sight-reading, the skill of playing previously unseen written music with fluency, an ability which Goodman and trumpeter Harry James both possessed.

As an improviser, Harris seemed comfortable playing among divergent stylists, as shown on Jazz at the Philharmonic recordings, as his "one-off" style seemed to work in any context, from Dixieland, to swing, or bebop.

His solo on "Bijou" with Herman remains a classic, while his idiosyncratic treatment of the ballad "Everything Happens to Me", is known for its vocality, and his treatment of the ballad "Everywhere" was inspiration for Roswell Rudd's free-contrapuntal version of the song. Later, Harris worked in Las Vegas, finally retiring to Florida.

Harris died in Hallandale, Florida, in August 1973, at the age of 56.

== Discography ==
=== As leader ===
- Bill Harris Herd (Norgran, 1956)
- Bill Harris and Friends (Fantasy, 1957) – with Ben Webster
- Live at the 3 Deuces! – with Charlie Ventura (Phoenix Jazz, 1975)
- Aces at the Deuces – with Charlie Ventura (Phoenix Jazz, 1976)

=== As sideman ===
With Woody Herman

- Blues Groove (Capitol, 1956)
- Songs for Hip Lovers (Verve, 1957)
- Woody Herman and His Orchestra '58 Featuring the Preacher (Columbia, 1958)

With Jim and Bill

- The Woodpecker (Smar-t, Quartercash, Fun, Year unknown/lost)

With Charlie Ventura

- Jumping with Ventura (EmArcy, 1955)
- Carnegie Hall Concert (Columbia, 1956)
- East of Suez (Regent, 1958)

With others

- Ralph Burns, Ralph Burns Among the JATPs (Norgran, 1955)
- Benny Carter, Benny Carter Plays Pretty (Norgran, 1954)
- Benny Carter, New Jazz Sounds (Norgran, 1955)
- Lionel Hampton, The Great Hamp and Little T (Coral, 1963)
- Chubby Jackson, Chubby's Back! (Argo, 1957)
- Chubby Jackson, I'm Entitled to You!! (Argo, 1958)
- Gene Krupa, The Exciting Gene Krupa (Verve, 1965)
- Anita O'Day, Anita O'Day Sings Jazz (Norgran, 1955)
- Charlie Parker, Big Band (Clef, 1954)
- Nat Pierce, Kansas City Memories (Coral, 1957)
- Flip Phillips, Flip Wails (Clef, 1956)
- Charlie Teagarden, The Big Horn of Little T (Coral, 1962)
