= Afro (album) =

Studio album by Dizzy Gillespie
- Released: November 1954
- Recorded: May 24 and June 3, 1954; New York City
- Genre: Afro-Cuban jazz, bebop
- Length: 33:05
- Label: Norgran; MGN 1003
- Producer: Norman Granz

Dizzy Gillespie chronology
Diz and Getz (1953)	Afro (1954)	Dizzy and Strings (1954)

Afro is a studio album by the jazz trumpeter Dizzy Gillespie. It was released in November 1954 through Norgran Records. Gillespie worked with many Cuban musicians on the album.

== Reception ==
The AllMusic review states: "Pairing Dizzy Gillespie with Cuban arranger/composer Chico O'Farrill produced a stunning session which originally made up the first half of a Norgran LP... A later small-group session features the trumpeter with an all-Latin rhythm section and flutist Gilberto Valdes... it is well worth acquiring."

Professional ratings
Review scores
Source	Rating
AllMusic	4/5 stars
The Penguin Guide to Jazz Recordings	3.5/4 stars

== Track listing ==
1. "Manteca Theme" (Gil Fuller, Dizzy Gillespie, Chano Pozo) – 4:10
2. "Contraste" (Gillespie, Chico O'Farrill, Pozo) – 2:45
3. "Jungla" (Gillespie, O'Farrill, Pozo) – 4:44
4. "Rhumba Finale" (Gillespie, O'Farrill, Pozo) – 4:43
5. "A Night in Tunisia" (Gillespie, Frank Paparelli) – 4:19
6. "Con Alma" (Gillespie) – 5:05
7. "Caravan" (Duke Ellington, Irving Mills, Juan Tizol) – 7:19

== Personnel ==
- Dizzy Gillespie – trumpet
- Gilbert Valdez – flute (tracks 5–7)
- Quincy Jones, Jimmy Nottingham, Ernie Royal – trumpet (tracks 1–4)
- Leon Comegys, J. J. Johnson, George Matthews – trombone (tracks 1–4)
- George Dorsey, Hilton Jefferson – alto saxophone (tracks 1–4)
- Hank Mobley, Lucky Thompson – tenor saxophone (tracks 1–4)
- Danny Bank – baritone saxophone (tracks 1–4)
- Réne Hernandez (tracks 5–7), Wade Legge (tracks 1–4) – piano
- Lou Hackney (tracks 1–4), Roberto Rodríguez – bass
- Charlie Persip – drums (tracks 1–4)
- Cándido Camero – congas, percussion
- Mongo Santamaria – congas (tracks 1–4)
- José Mangual – bongos
- Ubaldo Nieto – timbales
- Ralph Miranda – percussion (tracks 5–7)
- Chico O'Farrill – arranger (tracks 1–4)
