= Jazz Recital =

Studio album by Dizzy Gillespie
- Released: 1956
- Recorded: May 25 & June 8, 1954, and September 12 & November 8, 1955; New York City
- Genre: Jazz
- Labels: Norgran; MGN 1083
- Producer: Norman Granz

Dizzy Gillespie chronology
Roy and Diz (1954)	Jazz Recital (1956)	One Night in Washington (1955)

Professional ratings
Review scores
Source	Rating
AllMusic	3/5 stars
DownBeat	3/5 stars
The Encyclopedia of Popular Music	3/5 stars

Jazz Recital (also released as Dizzy Gillespie and His Orchestra) is an album by the trumpeter Dizzy Gillespie, recorded in 1954 and 1955 and released on the Norgran label. It consists of quintet, sextet and jazz orchestra tracks.

== Release and reception ==
Jazz Recital was released by Norgran Records in 1956 and by Verve Records the following year. Two of the tracks from the album were also released as singles.

Billboard wrote that: "Diz is the whole show instrumentally, and he's in great form, musically and commercially". In his DownBeat review, Ralph J. Gleason's summary was: "Despite the magnificence of Dizzy's trumpet on several of these tracks, notably the beautifully moody 'Blue Mood', this is an uneven album." He praised the playing of trombonist Jimmy Cleveland on 'Rails' and saxophonist Hank Mobley in the small-group recordings, but asserted that vocalist Toni Harper "simply does not make it in this league". In his 1950s review of Gillespie's recordings, John S. Wilson described two Verve releases – Jazz Recital and Birks' Works – as "leftover odds and ends which makes a spotty program".

== Track listing ==
All compositions by Dizzy Gillespie and Buster Harding except as indicated

1. "Sugar Hips" (Dizzy Gillespie, Wade Legge) – 5:16
2. "Hey Pete" (Gillespie, Buster Harding, Lester Peterson) – 5:07
3. "Money Honey" (Jesse Stone) – 2:30
4. "Blue Mood" – 3:29
5. "Rails" – 3:30
6. "Devil and the Flesh" – 3:21
7. "Rumbola" – 3:25
8. "Taking a Chance on Love" (Vernon Duke, Ted Fetter, John Latouche) – 3:26
9. "Play Me the Blues" –
10. "(Seems Like) You Just Don't Care" (Kitty Noble, Rose Marie McCoy) –

== Personnel ==
- Dizzy Gillespie – trumpet, vocals
- Hank Mobley – tenor saxophone (tracks 1–7)
- Jimmy Cleveland – trombone (tracks 4–6 & 10)
- Harry Edison (tracks 8 & 9), Taft Jordan (track 10), Ermit V. Perry (track 10), Ernie Royal (track 10) – trumpet (tracks 5–8)
- Matthew Gee (track 10), Melba Liston (tracks 8 & 9), Jimmy Wilkins (track 10) – trombone
- Gigi Grice (track 10), Hilton Jefferson (track 10), Willie Smith (tracks 8 & 9) – alto saxophone
- Curtis Amy (tracks 8 & 9), Ed Beel (tracks 8 & 9), Ernie Wilkins (track 10), Budd Johnson (track 10) – tenor saxophone
- Clyde Dunn (tracks 8 & 9), Sahib Shihab (track 10) – baritone saxophone
- Wade Legge (tracks 1–7 & 10), Carl Perkins (tracks 8 & 9) – piano
- George Bledsoe (tracks 8 & 9), Nelson Boyd (track 10), Lou Hackney (tracks 1–7) – double bass
- Al Bartee (tracks 8 & 9), Charlie Persip (tracks 1–7 & 10) – drums
- Toni Harper (tracks 8 & 9), Herb Lance (track 10) – vocals
