= Bob Szajner =

American jazz pianist (1938–2019)

Bob Szajner (12 September 1938 – 9 November 2019) was an American jazz pianist.

== Early life ==
Born on September 12, 1938, Bob Szajner grew up listening to talented relatives playing various instruments. His mother taught him the basics of music and how to play piano at a very early age.

In 1948, he won first prize in the "Frankie Carle Piano Contest". This entitled him to one weeks performance at the Fox Theater in Detroit. He was one of the opening acts on the bill (a vaudeville theme) for Billie Holiday along with a comedian and an acrobatic duo. He enjoyed listening to Billie Holiday's style of music and accompaniment for her. This was the beginning of his quest for his own personal style.

Ten years later, for at least ten years, he started writing and performing "Modern Jazz" later known as "Bebop" and then later as "Hard Bop". He performed with many musicians from the "Detroit jazz" scene at various sessions, venues and jazz clubs throughout the Detroit metropolitan area. He often worked with Donald Byrd, Charlie McPherson, Lonnie Hillyer, Roy Brooks, Yusef Lateef, Pepper Adams, Frank Isola, and others as a back-up piano player.

== Later career ==
For the next ten years, he wrote some tunes, but really became quite dismayed and disappointed with the business of music, especially, the lack of audience. Then on October 8, 1978 (his 18th wedding anniversary), he recorded material for an album with his old school friend, drummer Roy Brooks and Roy's bass man Ray McKinney. "The Bob Szajner Triad" was a three record set of his original compositions. A twenty-seven tune recording session performing original music never played before or rehearsed and without second takes. This was the "Triad" concept. This led to performances at "The Cafe Detroit", "The Detroit Jazz Center", and the "Montreux Detroit Jazz Festival 1981".

Later albums featuring Ed Pickens on bass and Frank Isola on drums (The Bob Szajner Triad II), were recorded in 1981 at "The Detroit Jazz Center World Stage".
