= Joe Reisman =

American jazz musician

Joseph Reisman (September 16, 1924 – September 15, 1987) was an American musician (tenor and baritone saxophone, clarinet), bandleader, arranger, and record producer in the swing era.

Reisman was born in Dallas in 1924 and studied at Baylor University and at the University of Texas at El Paso. He began his music career as a saxophonist in bands like Glen Gray's Casa Loma Orchestra, Louis Prima, Bob Crosby, Sam Donahue, Frankie Masters, and Jack Teagarden. As an arranger he worked for Ray Bauduc and Gene Williams. At the end of the 1940s he gave up an active career as a musician, and worked as an arranger and producer in the Hollywood studios. He arranged and conducted for Patti Page, accompanying her on her hits "(How Much Is) That Doggie in the Window?", "Tennessee Waltz", and "Mockingbird Hill", and for Perry Como, including on "Catch a Falling Star" and "Papa Loves Mambo". He also worked on productions by Eartha Kitt ("Sho-Jo-Ji (The Hungry Raccoon)"), Sarah Vaughan, June Valli, Georgia Gibbs, Ann-Margret, Lena Horne, André Previn and the Ames Brothers.

In the mid-1950s he was the musical director of several television shows, including NBC's Shower of Stars and The Oldsmobile Hour; He also worked for RCA Victor and Roulette Records. At RCA and Roulette, he also recorded several albums in an easy listening style, and had a minor hit with a cover version of Ross Bagdasarian's "Armen's Theme". At the beginning of the 1960s, Reisman returned to RCA and then worked as a producer for Henry Mancini for almost thirty years, starting with his album Our Man in Hollywood (1964).

He died of a heart attack one day before his 63rd birthday on September 15, 1987 in Los Angeles. In 1996, his widow donated his collection of scores to the New York Public Library for the Performing Arts.
