= New Jazz Sounds =

Studio album by Benny Carter with Dizzy Gillespie and Bill Harris
- Released: 1955
- Recorded: June 23, September 14 and November 12, 1954; Los Angeles, CA and Fine Sound Studios, NYC
- Genre: Jazz
- Label: Norgran; MGN 1044
- Producer: Norman Granz

Benny Carter chronology
Benny Carter Plays Pretty (1954)	New Jazz Sounds (1955)	Urbane Jazz (1955)

New Jazz Sounds is an album by American jazz saxophonist Benny Carter featuring trumpeter Dizzy Gillespie and trombonist Bill Harris recorded in 1954 and originally released on the Norgran label.

== Reception ==
Professional ratings
Review scores
Source	Rating
AllMusic	2/5 stars

Allmusic awarded the album 2 stars.

== Track listing ==
1. "Just One of Those Things" (Cole Porter) - 6:08
2. "Marriage Blues" (Benny Carter) - 7:41
3. "Angel Eyes" (Matt Dennis, Earl Brent) - 3:27
4. "That Old Black Magic" (Harold Arlen, Johnny Mercer) - 6:47
5. "The Song Is You" (Jerome Kern, Oscar Hammerstein II) - 4:49
6. "This Can't Be Love" (Richard Rodgers, Lorenz Hart) - 3:27
7. "Frenesí" (Alberto Domínguez, Leonard Whitcup) - 4:42

== Personnel ==
- Benny Carter – alto saxophone
- Dizzy Gillespie (tracks 1 & 2) – trumpet
- Bill Harris (tracks 1–5) – trombone
- Oscar Peterson (tracks 1–5 & 7) – piano
- Don Abney (track 6) – piano
- Herb Ellis (tracks 1–5 & 7) – guitar
- Ray Brown (tracks 1–5 & 7) – double bass
- George Duvivier (track 6) – double bass
- Buddy Rich (tracks 1–5) – drums
- Louis Bellson (track 6) – drums
- Bobby White (track 7) – drums
