= Benny Carter Plays Pretty =

Studio album by Benny Carter
- Released: 1955
- Recorded: June 23 and September 14, 1954
- Studio: Los Angeles and Fine Sound Studios, New York City
- Genre: Jazz
- Label: Norgran
- Producer: Norman Granz

Benny Carter chronology
Cosmopolite (1956)	Benny Carter Plays Pretty (1955)	New Jazz Sounds (1955)

Benny Carter Plays Pretty (also released as Moonglow) is an album by jazz saxophonist Benny Carter that was recorded in 1954 and released by Norgran Records.

Billboard in 1955 wrote: "This is mainly 'mood music' in the jazz idiom, and highly effective."

== Reception ==
Professional ratings
Review scores
Source	Rating
AllMusic	3/5 stars

Allmusic awarded the album 3 stars.

== Track listing ==
No.	Title	Length
1.	"Moonglow" (Will Hudson, Irving Mills, Eddie DeLange)	2:44
2.	"My One and Only Love" (Guy Wood, Robert Mellin)	3:51
3.	"Love Is Here to Stay" (George Gershwin, Ira Gershwin)	3:35
4.	"Tenderly" (Walter Gross, Jack Lawrence)	3:37
5.	"Unforgettable" (Irving Gordon)	3:21
6.	"Laura" (David Raksin, Johnny Mercer)	7:41
7.	"Ruby" (Heinz Roemheld, Mitchell Parish)	4:32
8.	"Moon Song" (Sam Coslow, Arthur Johnston)	3:56

== Personnel ==
- Benny Carter – alto saxophone
- Don Abney (tracks 1–5, 7 & 8) – piano
- Oscar Peterson (track 6) – piano
- George Duvivier (track 1–5, 7 & 8) – double bass
- Ray Brown (track 6) – double bass
- Louis Bellson (tracks 1–5, 7 & 8) – drums
- Buddy Rich (track 6) – drums
- Herb Ellis (track 6) – guitar
- Bill Harris (track 6) – trombone
