= Alone Together (Benny Carter album) =

Studio album by Benny Carter with His Strings and the Oscar Peterson Quartet
- Released: 1956
- Recorded: September 18 & 19, 1952
- Studio: Reeves Sound Studios, New York City
- Genre: Jazz
- Label: Norgran
- Producer: Norman Granz

Benny Carter chronology
Alone Together (1956)	Cosmopolite (1954)

The Formidable Benny Carter Cover

Alone Together is an album by American jazz saxophonist Benny Carter and his orchestra with the Oscar Peterson Quartet. The album was recorded in 1952 and released by Norgran Records. It includes tracks that were released on the 10 inch LP The Formidable Benny Carter and recordings from the same sessions.

== Reception ==
Professional ratings
Review scores
Source	Rating
AllMusic	2/5 stars

Allmusic gave the album two stars.

== Track listing ==
No.	Title	Length
1.	"Isn't It Romantic?" (Richard Rodgers, Lorenz Hart)	3:40
2.	"Some Other Spring" (Arthur Herzog Jr., Irene Kitchings)	3:45
3.	"These Things You Left Me" (Harold Dickinson, Sidney Lippman)	3:38
4.	"Gone with the Wind" (Allie Wrubel, Herb Magidson)	2:59
5.	"I Got It Bad (and That Ain't Good)" (Duke Ellington, Paul Francis Webster)	2:57
6.	"Long Ago (and Far Away)" (Jerome Kern, Ira Gershwin)	3:05
7.	"Alone Together" (Arthur Schwartz, Howard Dietz)	2:36
8.	"Bewitched, Bothered and Bewildered" (Rodgers, Hart)	3:13
9.	"Cocktails for Two" (Arthur Johnston, Sam Coslow)	2:58
10.	"Key Largo" (Carter, Karl Suessdorf, Leah Worth)	3:07
11.	"I've Got the World on a String" (Harold Arlen, Ted Koehler)	3:21
12.	"'Round About Midnight" (Thelonious Monk)	3:17

Note: tracks 1–3, 7–10, 12 are included on the original The Formidable Benny Carter 10" album.

== Personnel ==
- Benny Carter – alto saxophone
- Oscar Peterson – piano
- Barney Kessel – guitar
- Ray Brown – double bass
- Buddy Rich – drums
- Arranged and conducted by Joe Glover
