= Kathryn Reed Altman =

American actress

- Born: Kathryn Audrey Reed; June 2, 1924; Glendale, California, U.S.
- Died: March 9, 2016 (aged 91); Santa Monica, California, U.S.
- Occupations: Actress, writer, archivist, film consultant
- Years active: 1952–1959
- Notable work: Altman (2014), The Katherine Reed Story (1965)
- Spouses: Tommy Pederson (divorced) Robert Altman (m. 1959; died 2006)

Kathryn Reed Altman (born Kathryn Audrey Reed; June 2, 1924 – March 9, 2016) was an American actress, a memoirist, an archivist, and a film consultant. She was the third wife and later widow of film director Robert Altman.

== Biography ==
Kathryn Reed Altman was born to Richard Reed and Lois Cummings in Glendale, California on June 2, 1924. She died in Santa Monica, California on March 9, 2016.

== Career ==
Altman completed high school at Hollywood High School. She then joined the musical revue Earl Carroll Vanities. She began her acting career as a swimmer in Million Dollar Mermaid (1952), which featured Esther Williams, the American swimmer and actress. During an acting appearance as a nurse in one of the television episodes of Whirlybirds in 1959, Kathryn Reed met the American film director Robert Altman, who was directing the series at that time. They married in 1959 and were married for 47 years, until his death in 2006.

It was after their marriage that Kathryn Reed Altman shifted her focus from the pursuit of an acting career to an active and supportive role in facilitating her husband's film career and also to their children, which at that time were four. She had a daughter, Konni, from her first marriage to Tommy Pederson. Robert had three children from his previous two marriages: a daughter and two sons, Christine, Stephan, and Michael. They later had two sons together, Robert and Matthew. Altman would frequently travel to the locations of her husband's film sets that were located in various places around the globe, bring their children along with her.

Altman became a prolific archivist watchfully documenting her husband's film career. She would frequently assist him on his films sets; although none of these roles were listed in the films' credits. She filled 32 photo albums with thousands of pictures of their professional and family related activities. Her documentation was the basis of her book Altman that was co-authored with Giulia D'Argnolo Vallan.

In 1965 her husband made the short film The Kathryn Reed Story, for her as a birthday gift; which is now part the Robert Altman Collection at the University of Michigan's Special Collections Library. Altman had established this collection with the university.

Altman continued to be very active well after her husband's death and became a featured speaker at various retrospectives of his work; attending special screenings in London, Venice, New York City and Los Angeles. She participated in the making of the film documentary Altman by Ron Mann, that celebrated Robert Altman's life. She was a consultant on that film.

=== Significant works ===
- Altman (2014) ISBN 9781419707773.

=== Legacy and influence ===
"The Altman Experience" was atmosphere present on the Robert Altman film sets. This family experience was generated by Robert Altman but facilitated by Kathryn Reed Altman. All the film's participants were invited to the dailies where they would view the previous day's footage.

Kathryn Reed Altman throughout her marriage to Robert Altman ardently documented and archived their family and professional activities. She collected documents, photographs, and awards among other memorabilia.

In 2014 she co-wrote a memoir Altman with Giulia D'Argnolo Vallen. She extracted materials from the 35 years of history she had meticulously catalogued over the years. She later presented these originals to the University of Michigan and the materials became the Robert Altman Collection; thereby safeguarding the artistic legacy of her husband as well as her own. The University of Michigan librarian Phillip Hallman stated, "While Kathryn Altman's name does not appear in the credits of any of her husband's films, the Altman collection is as much a tribute to her as it is to Bob himself.... Her presence led directly to her stewardship of his legacy, which she worked on tirelessly until the end."

Altman supported several of the University of California, Los Angeles archive projects, including a 2014 retrospective and two film restorations. She also donated her husband's private film collection to the UCLA Robert Altman Archive.

==== Archives & collections ====
- Robert Altman Archive, Museum of Modern Art Archive
- Robert Altman Archive, University of California, Los Angeles
- Robert Altman Collection, University of Michigan's Special Collection Library
