= Stan Getz in Stockholm =

Studio album by Stan Getz
- Released: 1956
- Recorded: December 16, 1955; Stockholm, Sweden
- Genre: Jazz
- Length: 43:45
- Label: Verve; MGV 8213
- Producer: Norman Granz

Stan Getz chronology
Stan Getz and the Cool Sounds (1953-55)	Stan Getz in Stockholm (1956)	For Musicians Only (1956)

Stan Getz in Stockholm is an album by saxophonist Stan Getz, recorded in Sweden in 1955 and first released on the Verve label.

== Reception ==
The AllMusic review awarded the album 3½ stars, stating: "Getz's lyricism is at a peak here. He can solo right inside the melody with his phrasing, yet accent the actual songs these tunes were taken from. This is top-notch Getz all the way through."

Professional ratings
Review scores
Source	Rating
AllMusic	3.5/5 stars
The Rolling Stone Jazz Record Guide	3/5 stars

== Track listing ==
1. "Indiana" (Ballard MacDonald, James F. Hanley) - 4:54
2. "Without a Song" (Vincent Youmans, Billy Rose, Edward Eliscu) - 4:42
3. "I Don't Stand a Ghost of a Chance with You" (Victor Young, Ned Washington, Bing Crosby) - 5:53
4. "I Can't Believe That You're in Love with Me" (Jimmy McHugh, Clarence Gaskill) - 5:22
5. "Everything Happens to Me" (Tom Adair, Matt Dennis) - 7:11
6. "Over the Rainbow" (Harold Arlen. Yip Harburg) - 5:26
7. "Get Happy" (Arlen, Ted Koehler) - 5:15
8. "Jeepers Creepers" (Harry Warren, Johnny Mercer) - 5:02

== Personnel ==
- Stan Getz - tenor saxophone
- Bengt Hallberg - piano
- Gunnar Johnson - bass
- Anders Burman - drums
