= Stan Getz and the Cool Sounds =

Studio album by Stan Getz
- Released: 1957
- Recorded: April 16, 1953, January 23 and November 9, 1954 and January 31 and August 19, 1955; Los Angeles, California and New York City
- Genre: Jazz
- Label: Verve; MGV 8200
- Producer: Norman Granz

Stan Getz chronology
West Coast Jazz (1955)	Stan Getz and the Cool Sounds (1957)	Stan Getz in Stockholm (1955)

Stan Getz and the Cool Sounds is an album by saxophonist Stan Getz, recorded at five sessions between 1953 and 1955 which was released on the Verve label in 1957.

== Reception ==
The AllMusic review by Ken Dryden awarded the album 4 stars.

Professional ratings
Review scores
Source	Rating
AllMusic	4/5 stars
Disc	4/5 stars
The Penguin Guide to Jazz Recordings	3.5/4 stars

== Track listing ==
1. "Of Thee I Sing" (George Gershwin, Ira Gershwin) - 4:07
2. "A Handful of Stars" (Jack Lawrence) - 3:17
3. "Love Is Here to Stay" (George Gershwin, Ira Gershwin) - 3:22
4. "Serenade in Blue" (Harry Warren, Mack Gordon) - 3:51
5. "Flamingo" (Ted Grouya, Edmund Anderson) - 7:30
6. "Blue Bells" (Phil Sunkel) - 7:09
7. "Roundup Time" (Sunkel) - 7:05
8. "Nobody Else But Me" (Jerome Kern, Oscar Hammerstein II) - 3:33
9. "Down by the Sycamore Tree" (Traditional) - 3:02
10. "Rustic Hop" (Bob Brookmeyer) - 3:45
- Recorded in New York City on April 16, 1953 (track 10) and January 31, 1955 (tracks 6 & 7), and in Los Angeles, California, on January 23, 1954 (tracks 8 & 9) and November 9, 1954 (track 5) and at Radio Recorders, Los Angeles, California, on August 19, 1955 (tracks 1–4).

== Personnel ==
- Stan Getz - tenor saxophone
- Tony Fruscella - trumpet (tracks 6 & 7)
- Bob Brookmeyer - valve trombone (tracks 5 & 10)
- Lou Levy (tracks 1–4), Jimmy Rowles (tracks 8, 9), John Williams (tracks 5, 6, 7 & 10) - piano
- Bill Anthony (tracks 5–7), Bill Crow (track 10), Leroy Vinnegar (tracks 1–4), Bob Whitlock (tracks 8 & 9) - bass
- Frank Isola (tracks 5–7), Al Levitt (track 10), Shelly Manne (tracks 1–4), Max Roach (tracks 8 & 9) - drums
