= West Coast Live (album) =

Live album by Chet Baker & Stan Getz
- Released: 1997
- Recorded: June 12, 1953 and August 17, 1954
- Venue: The Haig, Hollywood and Tiffany Club, Los Angeles
- Genre: Jazz
- Label: Pacific Jazz; CDP 7243
- Producer: Richard Bock

Chet Baker chronology
Timeless (1952-56)	West Coast Live (1997)	Chet Baker Quartet featuring Russ Freeman (1953)

Stan Getz chronology
Stan Getz Plays (1951)	West Coast Live (1953)	Interpretations by the Stan Getz Quintet (1953)

West Coast Live is a live album by trumpeter Chet Baker and saxophonist Stan Getz, recorded in California in 1953 but not released until 1997, on the Pacific Jazz label.

== Reception ==
Professional ratings
Review scores
Source	Rating
AllMusic	3/5 stars
The Penguin Guide to Jazz Recordings	3/4 stars
Uncut	4/5 stars

Lindsay Planer of AllMusic states: "For two men who purportedly would rather not be in the same room at the same time, Baker and Getz are able to create some legitimately brilliant improvisation".

== Track listing ==
Disc one

1. "My Funny Valentine" (Lorenz Hart, Richard Rodgers) - 2:59
2. "Strike Up the Band" (George Gershwin, Ira Gershwin) - 5:06
3. "The Way You Look Tonight" (Dorothy Fields, Jerome Kern) - 6:18
4. "Yardbird Suite" (Charlie Parker) - 4:49
5. "Yesterdays" (Otto Harbach, Kern) - 4:23
6. "Winter Wonderland" (Felix Bernard, Dick Smith) - 4:09
7. "Come Out Wherever You Are" (Sammy Cahn, Jule Styne) - 5:28
8. "Move" (Denzil Best) - 4:34
9. "What's New?" (Johnny Burke, Bob Haggart) - 3:41
10. "Half Nelson" (Miles Davis) - 5:42
11. "Little Willie Leaps" (Davis) - 3:55
12. "Soft Shoe" (Gerry Mulligan) - 6:06
13. "Whispering" (Richard Coburn, Vincent Rose, Malvin Schonberger) - 9:40

Disc two

1. "Bernie's Tune" (Bernie Miller, Jerry Leiber, Mike Stoller) - 3:39
2. "All the Things You Are" (Oscar Hammerstein II, Kern) - 5:33
3. "Winter Wonderland" [Take 2] (Bernard, Smith) - 4:18
4. "Gone With the Wind" (Herb Magidson, Allie Wrubel) - 5:25
5. "All the Things You Are" (Hammerstein, Kern) - 17:42
6. "Darn That Dream" (Jimmy Van Heusen, Eddie DeLange) - 12:06
7. "Crazy Rhythm" (Irving Caesar, Roger Wolfe Kahn, Joseph Meyer) - 8:41
- Recorded at The Haig in Hollywood on June 12, 1953 (Disc one and Disc two, tracks 1–4), and Tiffany Club in Los Angeles on August 17, 1954 (Disc two, tracks 5–7)

== Personnel ==
- Chet Baker - trumpet
- Stan Getz - tenor saxophone
- Russ Freeman - piano (Disc Two, tracks 5–7)
- Carson Smith - bass
- Larry Bunker (Disc One and Disc Two, tracks 1–4), Shelly Manne (Disc Two, tracks 5–7) - drums
