= George Matthews (musician) =

American jazz musician

- Born: September 23, 1912; Dominica, British West Indies
- Died: June 28, 1982 (aged 69) New York City, New York, U.S.
- Genres: Jazz
- Instruments: Trombone

George Matthews(September 23, 1912 – June 28, 1982) was a jazz trombonist.

== Career ==
Matthews was born in the British West Indies on September 23, 1912 and immigrated to the United States as a child. He grew up in New York City where he was trained as a musician at the Martin Smith School of Music from 1927-1931.

Matthews was adept on tuba, trumpet, and trombone. He received classical training in New York City and played with local dance and jazz bands before joining Tiny Bradshaw's group in the early-1930s. He worked later in the 1930s with Willie Bryant, Louis Armstrong, Chick Webb, and Ella Fitzgerald. After World War II, Matthews worked extensively with Count Basie, then joined Erskine Hawkins's group in the early 1950s. In the 1960s he played with Lucille Dixon and Clark Terry, among others.

== Discography ==
- Cannonball Adderley, African Waltz (Riverside, 1961)
- Count Basie, Brand New Wagon (Bluebird, 1990)
- Count Basie, Shoutin' Blues 1949 (Bluebird, 1993)
- Ray Charles, Genius + Soul = Jazz (Impulse!, 1961)
- Ella Fitzgerald, Newport Jazz Festival Live at Carnegie Hall July 5, 1973 (CBS, 1973)
- Ella Fitzgerald, Live from the Roseland Ballroom New York 1940 (Sunbeam, 1974)
- Lucky Millinder with Sister Rosetta Tharpe, Lucky Days 1941–1945 (MCA, 1980)

With Dizzy Gillespie

- Afro (Norgran, 1954)
- Dizzy and Strings (Norgran, 1954)
- Carnegie Hall Concert (Verve, 1961)

With Dicky Wells

- Bones for the King (Felsted, 1958)
- Trombone Four-in-Hand (Felsted, 1959)
