= King of the Tenors =

Studio album by Ben Webster
- Released: 1954
- Recorded: May 21, 1953; December 8, 1953
- Genre: Jazz
- Label: Norgran (MGN 1001); Verve (MGV 8020)
- Producer: Norman Granz

Ben Webster chronology
| King of the Tenors (1954) | Music for Loving (1955) |

The Consummate Artistry of Ben Webster cover

King of the Tenors is an album by American jazz saxophonist Ben Webster featuring tracks recorded in 1953 for the Norgran label and originally released as The Consummate Artistry of Ben Webster (MGN 1001). The album was re-issued in 1957 on Verve Records as King of the Tenors (MGV 8020), and has been released with that title ever since. Webster is accompanied by the Oscar Peterson Trio, and, on several tracks, by Benny Carter and Harry "Sweets" Edison.

== Reception ==
Professional ratings
Review scores
| Source | Rating |
|---|---|
| AllMusic | 4/5 stars |
| The Penguin Guide to Jazz | 4/4 stars |
| The Virgin Encyclopedia of Jazz | 4/5 stars |

AllMusic awarded the album 4 stars, with reviewer Ron Wynn describing King of the Tenors as "a series of elegant yet soulful and exuberant small group dates... Although this date is more than four decades old, Ben Webster's solos have a freshness and vitality that make them quite relevant to contemporary events."

The Penguin Guide to Jazz gave King of the Tenors 4 stars out of 4, saying "'Tenderly' has never been more tender, 'That's All' is sheer heaven, but 'Jive at Six' is a good piece of studio knockabout."

In Someone to Watch Over Me: The Life and Music of Ben Webster, Frank Buchmann-Moller writes of the album: "These recordings show a broad spectrum of Ben's craft and can be heard as a summary of his artistic level at the time.... On the blues tunes 'Jive at Six' and 'Bounce Blues'... he plays with gusto and drive, and 'Cotton Tail' is exceptional, built up over six choruses, inspired and full of direction all the way....[I]t is the ballads that stand out, beginning with a one-and-a-half-chorus version of 'Tenderly,' in a rendition perfectly reflecting the title. Ellington's 'Don't Get Around Much Anymore' is played at a medium slow pace... with Ben at his most lyrical, presenting the theme almost seductively."

== Track listing ==
Side A

1. "Tenderly" (Walter Gross, Jack Lawrence) - 3:02
2. "Jive at Six" (Harry "Sweets" Edison) - 4:11
3. "Don't Get Around Much Anymore" (Duke Ellington, Bob Russell) - 3:06
4. "That's All" (Alan Brandt, Bob Haymes) - 3:48

Side B

1. "Bounce Blues" (Ben Webster) - 4:32
2. "Pennies from Heaven" (Arthur Johnston, Johnny Burke) - 2:49
3. "Cotton Tail" (Ellington) - 3:21
4. "Danny Boy" (Frederic Weatherly) - 3:37

1993 CD reissue bonus tracks

9. "Poutin'" (Webster) - previously unissued - 3:56
10. "Bounce Blues" (Webster) - previously unissued alternate take - 3:36
11. "That's All" (Brandt, Haymes) - single version - 2:55
  - Recorded in New York City on May 21 (tracks 5, 7–10) and in Los Angeles on December 8 (tracks 1–4, 6 & 11), 1953

== Personnel ==
- Ben Webster – tenor saxophone
- Benny Carter – alto saxophone (tracks 2–4, 6 & 11)
- Harry "Sweets" Edison – trumpet (tracks 2–4, 6 & 11)
- Oscar Peterson – piano
- Herb Ellis (tracks 1–4, 6 & 11), Barney Kessel (tracks 5, 7–10) – guitar
- Ray Brown – double bass
- Alvin Stoller (tracks 1–4, 6 & 11), J. C. Heard (tracks 5, 7–10) – drums
