= Hamp and Getz =

Studio album by Lionel Hampton and Stan Getz
- Released: 1955
- Recorded: August 1, 1955
- Studio: Radio Recorders, Hollywood, California
- Genre: Jazz
- Length: 51:37 CD reissue with bonus tracks
- Label: Norgran; MGN 1037
- Producer: Norman Granz

Stan Getz chronology
Stan Getz at The Shrine (1954)	Hamp and Getz (1955)	West Coast Jazz (1955)

Lionel Hampton chronology
The Lionel Hampton Art Tatum Buddy Rich Trio (1955)	Hamp and Getz (1955)	Hamp Roars Again (1955)

Hamp and Getz is an album by vibraphonist Lionel Hampton and saxophonist Stan Getz, recorded in 1955 and released on the Norgran label.

== Reception ==
The Billboard review published at the end of December 1955 stated: "Hampton is the stronger spirit of the two, and under his spell, Getz plays a guttier, less inhibited horn than usual." The AllMusic review awarded the album 4½ stars, stating: "The cool tenor of Stan Getz and the extroverted vibraphonist Lionel Hampton might have seemed like an unlikely matchup but once again producer Norman Granz showed his talents at combining complementary talents... Classic music from two of the best".

Professional ratings
Review scores
Source	Rating
AllMusic	4.5/5 stars

== Track listing ==
1. "Cherokee" (Ray Noble) – 9:15
2. "Ballad Medley: Tenderly/Autumn in New York/East of the Sun (and West of the Moon)/I Can't Get Started" (Walter Gross, Jack Lawrence/Vernon Duke/Brooks Bowman/Duke, Ira Gershwin) – 8:08
3. "Louise" (Leo Robin, Richard A. Whiting) – 6:47
4. "Jumpin' at the Woodside" (Count Basie) – 8:24
5. "Gladys" [Alternate Take] (Lionel Hampton) – 6:13 Bonus track on CD reissue
6. "Gladys" [Master Take] (Hampton) – 7:43
7. "Headache" (Unknown) – 5:07 Bonus track on CD reissue

== Personnel ==
- Lionel Hampton – vibraphone
- Stan Getz – tenor saxophone
- Lou Levy – piano
- Leroy Vinnegar – bass
- Shelly Manne – drums
- Unknown – trombone
