= Regent Records =

Regent Records has been the name of at least two different record labels:

- Regent Records (US) - an American-based company
- Regent Records (UK) - a British company
