= Stan Getz Plays =

Studio album by Stan Getz
- Released: 1955
- Recorded: December 12 & 29, 1952; New York City
- Genre: Jazz
- Length: 49:53 CD reissue with bonus tracks
- Labels: Norgran; MGN 1042
- Producer: Norman Granz

Stan Getz chronology
| Moonlight in Vermont (1952) | Stan Getz Plays (1955) | West Coast Live (1953) |

Stan Getz Plays is an album by jazz saxophonist Stan Getz, recorded in 1952 released on the Norgran label in 1955. The album features tracks that were previously released on two 10-inch LPs on Clef Records (MGC 137 and MGC 143).

== Reception ==
The AllMusic review by Scott Yanow stated: "Tenor saxophonist Stan Getz is in excellent form playing with one of his finest groups... Although the music does not quite reach the excitement level of the Getz-Raney Storyville session, this music (particularly the ballads) really shows off the tenor's appealing tone."

Professional ratings
Review scores
| Source | Rating |
|---|---|
| AllMusic | 4.5/5 stars |
| The Penguin Guide to Jazz Recordings | 4 |

== Track listing ==
1. "Stella by Starlight" (Victor Young, Ned Washington) – 2:41 Originally released on Clef MGC 137
2. "Time on My Hands" (Vincent Youmans, Harold Adamson, Mack Gordon) – 2:55 Originally released on Clef MGC 137
3. "'Tis Autumn" (Henry Nemo) – 3:11 Originally released on Clef MGC 137
4. "The Way You Look Tonight" (Jerome Kern, Dorothy Fields) – 3:01 Originally released on Clef MGC 137
5. "Lover, Come Back to Me" (Sigmund Romberg, Oscar Hammerstein II) – 2:54 Originally released on Clef MGC 137
6. "Body and Soul" (Johnny Green, Frank Eyton, Edward Heyman, Robert Sour) – 3:14 Originally released on Clef MGC 137
7. "Stars Fell on Alabama" (Frank Perkins. Mitchell Parish) – 3:21 Originally released on Clef MGC 137
8. "You Turned the Tables on Me" (Louis Alter, Sidney D. Mitchell) – 2:55 Originally released on Clef MGC 137
9. "Thanks for the Memory" (Ralph Rainger, Leo Robin) – 3:17 Originally released on Clef MGC 143
10. "Hymn of the Orient" (Gigi Gryce) – 2:53 Originally released on Clef MGC 143
11. "These Foolish Things" (Holt Marvell, Jack Strachey, Harry Link) – 3:20 Originally released on Clef MGC 143

Bonus tracks on CD reissue in 1988:

12. "How Deep Is the Ocean?" (Irving Berlin) – 2:48 Originally released on Clef MGC 143
13. "Nobody Else But Me" (Kern, Hammerstein) – 3:28 Originally released on Verve MGV 8200
14. "Down by the Sycamore Tree" (Traditional) – 3:00 Originally released on Verve MGV 8200
15. "I Hadn't Anyone Till You" (Ray Noble) – 2:51 Originally released on MGN 1034
16. "With the Wind and the Rain in Your Hair" (Jack Lawrence, Clara Edwards) – 3:46 Originally released on MGN 1034
- Recorded in New York City on December 12, 1952 (tracks 1–8), December 29, 1952 (tracks 9–12) and in Los Angeles, CA on January 23, 1954 (tracks 13–16)

== Personnel ==
- Stan Getz – tenor saxophone
- Jimmy Raney – guitar (tracks 1–12)
- Duke Jordan (tracks 1–12), Jimmy Rowles (tracks 13–16) – piano
- Bill Crow (tracks 1–12), Bob Whitlock (tracks 13–16) – bass
- Frank Isola (tracks 1–12), Max Roach (tracks 13–16) – drums
