= Music for Loving =

Studio album by Ben Webster
- Released: 1954
- Recorded: March 30, May 28, and December 15, 1954
- Studios: Fine Sound, New York City
- Genre: Jazz
- Labels: Norgran; Verve
- Producer: Norman Granz

Ben Webster chronology
King of the Tenors (1954)	Music for Loving (1954)	The Art Tatum - Ben Webster Quartet (1956)

Music with Feeling cover

Music for Loving is an album by American jazz saxophonist Ben Webster with tracks recorded in 1954 and released by Norgran in 1955. The album was reissued in 1957 by Verve as Sophisticated Lady. In 1996 Verve released a double CD compiling the album with another Norgran LP, Music with Feeling, and one by Harry Carney, Harry Carney with Strings which was first released by Clef.

== Reception ==
Professional ratings
Review scores
Source	Rating
AllMusic	4.5/5 stars
The Encyclopedia of Popular Music	4/5 stars
The Penguin Guide to Jazz	4/4 stars

Reviewing the compilation AllMusic's Stephen Cook stated that "the two-disc Music With Feeling delivers over two hours' worth of incredible ballad interpretations. Webster, of course, made his name with many an after-hours gem, and he predictably shines here amidst the lush yet tasteful orchestral charts penned by Ralph Burns, Gerald Wilson, and Billy Strayhorn ... Forget all those bachelor-pad compilations and give this collection a spin at your next cocktail party". The Penguin Guide to Jazz selected the double CD reissue as part of its suggested Core Collection.

It was voted number 2 in the 50 All-Time Overlooked Jazz Albums from Colin Larkin's All Time Top 1000 Albums.

== Track listing ==
Original LP

Side A

1. "All Too Soon" (Duke Ellington, Carl Sigman) – 4:45
2. "Love Is Here to Stay" (George Gershwin, Ira Gershwin) – 3:21
3. "It Happens to Be Me" (Arthur Kent, Sammy Gallop) – 3:21
4. "My Funny Valentine" (Richard Rodgers, Lorenz Hart) – 3:23
5. "You're Mine, You" (Johnny Green, Edward Heyman) – 3:07

Side B

1. "Do Nothin' Till You Hear from Me" (Ellington, Bob Russell) – 4:43
2. "Prelude to a Kiss" (Ellington, Irving Gordon, Irving Mills) – 4:46
3. "Come Rain or Come Shine" (Harold Arlen, Johnny Mercer) – 4:22
4. "Sophisticated Lady" (Ellington, Mills, Mitchell Parish) – 3:04
5. "Love's Away" (Ben Webster) – 3:19

1995 Double CD Compilation

Disc one

1. "Chelsea Bridge" (Billy Strayhorn) – 3:56 Originally released on Music with Feeling
2. "Willow Weep for Me" (Ann Ronell) – 4:38 Originally released on Music with Feeling
3. "There Is No Greater Love" (Isham Jones, Marty Symes) – 3:41 Originally released on Music with Feeling
4. "Teach Me Tonight" (Gene De Paul, Sammy Cahn) – 4:03 Originally released on Music with Feeling
5. "Until Tonight" (Victor Young, Edward Heyman) – 4:10 Originally released on Music with Feeling
6. "We'll Be Together Again" (Carl T. Fischer, Frankie Laine) – 4:32 Originally released on Music with Feeling
7. "Blue Moon" (Richard Rodgers, Lorenz Hart) – 5:06 Originally released on Music with Feeling
8. "Early Autumn" (Stan Rhodes, Barbara Belle) – 4:49 Originally released on Music with Feeling
9. "My Greatest Mistake" (Jack Fulton, Jack "Bones" O'Brien) – 3:35 Originally released on Music with Feeling
10. "What Am I Here For" (Duke Ellington) – 3:57 Originally released on Music with Feeling
11. "All Too Soon" (Ellington, Sigman) – 4:45
12. "Love Is Here to Stay" (Gershwin, Gershwin) – 3:21
13. "It Happens to Be Me" (Kent, Gallop) – 3:21
14. "Do Nothin' Till You Hear from Me" (Ellington, Bob Russell) – 4:43
15. "Prelude to a Kiss" (Ellington, Irving Gordon, Irving Mills) – 4:46
16. "Come Rain or Come Shine" (Harold Arlen, Johnny Mercer) – 4:22
17. "Love Is Here to Stay" [alternative take] (George Gershwin, Ira Gershwin) – 3:17 Previously unissued
18. "Love Is Here to Stay" [alternative take] (George Gershwin, Ira Gershwin) – 3:16 Previously unissued

Disc two

1. "Some Other Spring" (Arthur Herzog Jr., Irene Kitchings) – 4:46 Previously unissued
2. "When Your Lover Has Gone" (Einar Aaron Swan) – 3:37 Previously unissued
3. "Stars Fell on Alabama" (Frank Perkins, Parish) – 4:32 Previously unissued
4. "Under a Blanket of Blue" (Jerry Livingston, Al J. Neiburg, Marty Symes) – 3:17 Previously unissued
5. "Stars Fell on Alabama" [alternate take] (Perkins, Parish) – 4:40 Previously unissued
6. "Under a Blanket of Blue" [alternate take] (Livingston, Neiburg, Symes) – 3:31 Previously unissued
7. "Under a Blanket of Blue" [alternate take] (Livingston, Neiburg, Symes) – 3:20 Previously unissued
8. "My Funny Valentine" (Rodgers, Hart) – 3:23
9. "You're Mine, You" (Green, Heyman) – 3:07
10. "Sophisticated Lady" (Ellington, Mills, Parish) – 3:04
11. "Love's Away" (Webster) – 3:19
12. "Almost Like Being in Love" (Frederick Loewe, Alan Jay Lerner) – 3:59 Originally issued on Tenor Saxes various artists compilation Norgran MGN 1034
13. "I Don't Stand a Ghost of a Chance with You" (Victor Young, Ned Washington, Bing Crosby) – 5:48 Originally released on Harry Carney with Strings
14. "Take the "A" Train" (Billy Strayhorn) – 4:48 Originally released on Harry Carney with Strings
15. "We're in Love Again" (Harry Carney) – 3:41 Originally released on Harry Carney with Strings
16. "Chalmeau" (Carney) – 3:38 Originally released on Harry Carney with Strings
17. "Moonlight on the Ganges" (Sherman Myers, Chester Wallace) – 3:41 Originally released on Harry Carney with Strings
18. "It Had to Be You" (Isham Jones, Gus Kahn) – 4:17 Originally released on Harry Carney with Strings
19. "My Fantasy" (Carney) – 4:08 Originally released on Harry Carney with Strings
20. "I Got It Bad (and That Ain't Good)" (Ellington, Paul Francis Webster) – 4:22 Originally released on Harry Carney with Strings

== Personnel ==
- Ben Webster - tenor saxophone (all tracks except CD - 2:13-20)

March 30, 1954, at Fine Sound, New York City: LP - A:4 & 5 and B:4 & 5, CD - 2:8 to 11

- Teddy Wilson – piano
- Ray Brown – bass
- Jo Jones – drums

May 28, 1954, at Fine Sound, New York City: LP - A:1-3, CD - 1:1, 11-13, 17 & 18 and 2:12

- Tony Scott – clarinet
- Mac Ceppos, Richard Dickler, Milt Lomask, David Novales, Misha Edward Russell, Rudolph Sims
- Billy Strayhorn – piano, arranger
- George Duvivier – bass
- Louis Bellson – drums
- String section directed by Ralph Burns
  - David Novales, Mac Ceppos, Mischa Russell – violin
  - Richard Dickler – viola
  - Rudolph Sims – cello

December 13, 1954, at Fine Sound, New York City: Harry Carney with Strings CD - 2:13-20

- Harry Carney – baritone saxophone
- Ray Nance – trumpet, violin
- Tony Miranda – French horn
- Jimmy Hamilton – clarinet, tenor banjo
- Billy Bauer – guitar
- Leroy Lovett – piano
- Wendell Marshall – bass
- Louie Bellson – drums
- String section arranged and conducted by Ralph Burns
  - Ben Gerrard, Eugene Orloff, Howard Kay, Isadore Zir, Mac Ceppos, Martin Donegan, Sylvan Shulman, Zelly Smirnoff – violin
  - Alan Shulman, Doris Johnson, Sidney Edwards – cello

December 15, 1954, at Fine Sound, New York City: LP - B:1-3, CD - 1:2 & 14-16

- Jimmy Hamilton – clarinet
- Danny Bank – baritone saxophone
- Teddy Wilson – piano
- Wendell Marshall – bass
- Louis Bellson – drums
- String section arranged and conducted by Ralph Burns
  - Jack Zayde, Julius Schachter, Leo Kruczek, Solomon Deutsch – violin
  - Burt Fisch – viola
  - Bernard Greenhouse – cello

February 3, 1955, at Fine Sound, New York City: CD:2:1-7

- Teddy Wilson – piano
- Unidentified orchestra

September 9, 1955, in New York City: CD - 1:3-10

- Danny Bank – flute, clarinet
- Al Epstein – clarinet, English horn, bass clarinet
- Hank Jones – piano
- Chet Amsterdam, Wendell Marshall – bass
- Osie Johnson – drums
- String section arranged and conducted by Ralph Burns
  - Eugene Orloff, Harold Colletta, Harry Lookofsky, Leo Kruczek, Martin Donegan, Paul Winter, Tosha Samaroff – violin
  - Burt Fisch – viola
  - Abram Borodkin, George Ricci, Lucien Schmit – cello
