= Dizzy and Strings =

Studio album by Dizzy Gillespie
- Released: 1955
- Recorded: September 15 & 16, 1954; New York City
- Genre: Jazz
- Length: 32:23
- Label: Norgran; MGN 1023
- Producer: Norman Granz

Dizzy Gillespie chronology
| Afro (1954) | Dizzy and Strings (1955) | Roy and Diz (1954) |

Diz Big Band Cover

Dizzy and Strings (also released as Diz Big Band) is an album by trumpeter Dizzy Gillespie, released in 1955 by Norgran Records.

Professional ratings
Review scores
| Source | Rating |
|---|---|
| AllMusic | 3/5 stars |
| The Encyclopedia of Popular Music | 3/5 stars |

== Track listing ==
All compositions by Dizzy Gillespie except as indicated

1. "Roses of Picardy" (Frederic Weatherly, Haydn Wood) – 4:38
2. "Silhouette" (Johnny Richards) – 3:56
3. "Can You Recall?" (Richards) – 3:27
4. "O Solow" (Richards) – 5:06
5. "Cool Eyes" – 3:48
6. "Confusion" (Buster Harding) – 4:42
7. "Pile Driver" – 3:54
8. "Hob Nail Special" – 2:52

== Personnel ==
- Dizzy Gillespie – trumpet, vocals

Tracks 1–4 (with orchestra)

- John Barrows, Jim Buffington, Jim Chambers, Fred Klein – French horn
- George Berg, Jack Greenberg, Tom Parshley – woodwinds
- Danny Bank – baritone saxophone
- Wynton Kelly – piano
- Percy Heath – bass
- Jimmy Crawford – drums
- Unidentified string section
- Johnny Richards – arranger, conductor

Tracks 5–8 (with big band)

- Jimmy Nottingham, Ernie Royal, Quincy Jones – trumpet
- J. J. Johnson, George Matthews, Leon Comegys – trombone
- George Dorsey, Hilton Jefferson – alto saxophone
- Hank Mobley, Lucky Thompson – tenor saxophone
- Danny Bank – baritone saxophone
- Wade Legge – piano
- Lou Hackney – bass
- Charlie Persip – drums
- Buster Harding – arranger
