= The Spirit of '67 (Oliver Nelson and Pee Wee Russell album) =

Studio album by Pee Wee Russell and Oliver Nelson
- Released: 1967
- Recorded: February 14–15, 1967
- Studio: Capitol (New York City)
- Genre: Jazz
- Length: 31:38
- Label: Impulse! AS-9147
- Producer: Bob Thiele

Pee Wee Russell chronology
| The College Concert (1966) | The Spirit of '67 (1967) |

Oliver Nelson chronology
| Happenings (1966) | The Spirit of '67 (1967) | The Kennedy Dream (1967) |

The Spirit of '67 is an album by American jazz clarinetist Pee Wee Russell and composer/arranger Oliver Nelson featuring performances recorded in 1967 for the Impulse! label.

== Reception ==
The Allmusic review by Scott Yanow awarded the album 4 stars stating "In general, the charts are colorful and complement Russell well during what would be his swansong".

Professional ratings
Review scores
| Source | Rating |
|---|---|
| Allmusic | 4/5 stars |

== Track listing ==
1. "Love Is Just Around the Corner" (Louis Gensler, Leo Robin) - 2:50
2. "This Is It" (Pee Wee Russell) - 2:18
3. "Memories Of You" (Andy Razaf, Eubie Blake) - 3:12
4. "Pee Wee's Blues" (Pee Wee Russell) - 3:51
5. "The Shadow Of Your Smile" (Johnny Mandel, Paul Francis Webster) - 2:28
6. "Ja-Da" (Bob Carleton) - 3:46
7. "A Good Man Is Hard to Find" (Harry Saville) - 2:55
8. "Bopol" (Oliver Nelson) - 2:58
9. "I'm Coming Virginia" (Donald Heywood, Will Marion Cook) - 4:19
10. "Six and Four" (Nelson) - 3:39

Recorded on February 14 (#2–6) and February 15, 1967 (#1, 7–10).

== Personnel ==
Tracks 2–6

- Pee Wee Russell - clarinet
- Oliver Nelson - arranger, conductor
- Clark Terry, Joe Wilder, Ed Williams, Snooky Young - trumpet
- Jimmy Cleveland, Urbie Green, Dick Hixson - trombone
- Tony Studd - bass trombone
- Phil Woods, Jerry Dodgion - alto saxophone
- Frank Wess, Bob Ashton - tenor saxophone
- Danny Bank - baritone saxophone, bass clarinet
- Hank Jones - piano
- Howard Collins - guitar
- George Duvivier - bass
- Grady Tate - drums

Tracks 1, 7–10

- Pee Wee Russell - clarinet
- Oliver Nelson - arranger, conductor
- John Frosk, Thad Jones, Jimmy Nottingham, Marvin Stamm - trumpet
- Tom McIntosh, Tom Mitchell, Paul Faulise - trombone
- Phil Woods - alto saxophone
- Jerry Dodgion - alto saxophone, flute
- Bob Ashton - tenor saxophone
- Seldon Powell - tenor saxophone, flute
- Gene Allen - baritone saxophone
- Patti Bown - piano
- Howard Collins - guitar
- George Duvivier - bass
- Grady Tate - drums
