= Hilton Jefferson =

American jazz saxophonist (1903–1968)

- Born: Hilton Jefferson; July 30, 1903; Danbury, Connecticut, United States
- Died: November 14, 1968 (aged 65)
- Genres: Jazz
- Instrument: alto saxophone

Hilton Jefferson (July 30, 1903 – November 14, 1968) was an American jazz alto saxophonist born in Danbury, Connecticut, United States, perhaps best known for leading the saxophone section from 1940 to 1949 in the Cab Calloway band. Jefferson is said to have been "a soft, delicate saxophone player, with an exquisite sensibility."

In 1929, Jefferson began his professional career with Claude Hopkins, and throughout the 1930s was busy working for the big bands of Chick Webb, Fletcher Henderson and McKinney's Cotton Pickers. From 1952–1953, Jefferson performed with Duke Ellington, but ultimately became a bank guard to support himself with a steady income. In the 1950s, he continued to perform, especially with Rex Stewart and some former members of Fletcher Henderson's Orchestra.

== Discography ==
With Dizzy Gillespie

- Afro (Norgran, 1954)
- Dizzy and Strings (Norgran, 1954)
- Jazz Recital (Norgran, 1955)
- The Big Band Sound of Dizzy Gillespie (Verve, 1973)

With Rex Stewart

- Rendezvous with Rex (Felsted, 1958)
- The Big Reunion (Jazztone, 1958)
- Henderson Homecoming (United Artists, 1959)
- Porgy & Bess Revisited with Cootie Williams (Warner Bros., 1959)

With others

- Buster Bailey, All About Memphis (Felsted, 1958)
- Coleman Hawkins, Things Ain't What They Used to Be (Swingville, 1961)
- Tina Louise, It's Time for Tina (Urania, 1957)
- Al Sears and Taft Jordan, Rockin' in Rhythm (Swingville, 1960)
- Maxine Sullivan, Leonard Feather Presents Maxine Sullivan (Period, 1956)
- Bob Wilber, For Saxes Only! (Music Minus One, 1962)
- Jimmy Witherspoon, Goin' to Kansas City Blues (RCA Victor, 1958)
