= Tommy Pederson =

American jazz musician (1920–1998)

- Birth name: Pullman Gerald Pederson
- Born: August 15, 1920 Minnesota, U.S.
- Died: January 16, 1998 (aged 77)
- Genres: Jazz, big band, classical
- Instruments: Trombone
- Spouse: Kathryn Reed Altman

Pullman Gerald "Tommy" Pederson (August 15, 1920 – January 16, 1998) was an American trombonist and composer known for his work in jazz, big band, and classical genres.

== Career ==
Pederson performed and recorded with big bands and artists that included Gene Krupa, Tommy Dorsey, Nelson Riddle, Doc Severinsen (late 1960s), and Frank Sinatra. He was also a prolific studio musician for movie soundtracks, television and radio shows, and other recordings, sometimes playing as many as six studio sessions a day.

== Personal life ==
Pederson was married to Kathryn Reed Altman, an actress and writer, before divorcing.

== Discography ==
- Van Alexander, The Home of Happy Feet (Capitol, 1959)
- Ray Anthony, Jam Session at the Tower (Capitol, 1956)
- Ray Anthony, Ray Anthony Plays Steve Allen (Capitol, 1958)
- Ray Anthony, Sound Spectacular (Capitol, 1959)
- Georgie Auld, In the Land of Hi-Fi with Georgie Auld and His Orchestra (EmArcy, 1955)
- Charlie Barnet, Drop Me Off in Harlem (GRP/Decca, 1992)
- Louis Bellson, The Exciting Mr. Bellson (and His Big Band) (Norgran, 1954)
- Louis Bellson, Skin Deep (Norgran, 1955)
- Louis Bellson, Around the World in Percussion (Roulette, 1961)
- Albert Brooks, Comedy Minus One (ABC, 1973)
- Tutti Camarata, Camarata Featuring Tutti's Trombones (Coliseum, 1966)
- Benny Carter, Aspects (United Artists, 1959)
- Dick Cathcart, BIX MCMLIX (Warner Bros., 1959)
- Bing Crosby & Louis Armstrong, Bing & Satchmo (MGM, 1960)
- Alexander Courage, Hot Rod Rumble (Liberty, 1957)
- Buddy DeFranco, The Progressive Mr. DeFranco (Norgran, 1954)
- Tommy Dorsey, The Carnegie Hall V-Disc Session April 1944 (Hep, 1990)
- Dennis Farnon, Caution! Men Swinging (RCA Victor, 1957)
- Frances Faye, I'm Wild Again (Bethlehem, 1955)
- Ella Fitzgerald, Sings the Jerome Kern Songbook (Verve, 1963)
- The Four Freshmen, Four Freshmen and 5 Trombones (Capitol, 1955)
- Russ Garcia, Four Horns and a Lush Life (Bethlehem, 1956)
- Mitzi Gaynor, Sings the Lyrics of Ira Gershwin (Verve, 1959)
- Neal Hefti, Jazz Pops (Reprise, 1962)
- Al Hirt, Horn A-Plenty (RCA Victor, 1962)
- Spike Jones, Dinner Music for People Who Aren't Very Hungry (Verve, 1979)
- Bob Keene, Bob Keene & His Orchestra (Fresh Sound, 1954)
- B.B. King, Compositions of Duke Ellington and Others (Crown, 1960)
- Skip Martin, 8 Brass, 5 Sax, 4 Rhythm (MGM, 1959)
- Skip Martin, Songs and Sounds from the Era of the Untouchables (Somerset, 1960)
- Billy May, Sorta-May (Capitol, 1955)
- Billy May, Billy May's Big Fat Brass (Capitol, 1958)
- Billy May, The Girls and Boys on Broadway (Capitol, 1960)
- The Modernaires, We Remember Tommy Dorsey Too! (United Artists, 1962)
- Russ Morgan, Russ Morgan and His Wolverine Band (Everest, 1960)
- Anita O'Day & Billy May, Swing Rodgers and Hart (Verve, 1960)
- Boyd Raeburn, Boyd Raeburn and His Orchestra 1944–1945 (Circle, 1981)
- Johnny Richards, Something Else by Johnny Richards (Bethlehem, 1956)
- Nelson Riddle, Contemporary Sound of Nelson Riddle (United Artists, 1968)
- Joanie Sommers, The Voice of the Sixties! (Warner Bros., 1961)
- Mel Torme, Swingin' on the Moon (Verve, 1960)
