= Frank Isola =

American jazz musician (1925–2004)

Frank Isola (February 20, 1925 – December 12, 2004 in Detroit, Michigan) was an American jazz drummer.

Isola was born and raised in Detroit and was heavily influenced by Gene Krupa. He played in the U.S. military during World War II (1943–45), and then studied and performed in California with Bobby Sherwood and Earle Spencer. He then moved to New York City, where he played with Johnny Bothwell and Elliot Lawrence in 1947. Following this he played with Stan Getz (1951–53) and Gerry Mulligan (1953–54), as well as with Mose Allison, Eddie Bert, Bob Brookmeyer, Jimmy Raney, Johnny Williams and Tony Fruscella.

In a 2010 JazzWax interview by Marc Myers with Mose Allison quoted in the 2016 liner notes for the CD reissue of the Stan Getz The Soft Swing album by Phono, Allison credits Isola with introducing him to Getz in 1956:

JazzWax: In 1956, how did you meet Stan Getz?
Mose Allison: I used to go to these jam sessions at night at a loft on 34th St. that belonged to trombonist Clyde Cox. Many of the guys who were there were from the South. At these sessions, I met drummer Frank Isola, who put me in touch with Stan.

By the late 1950s Isola returned to Detroit and kept working periodically with local bands or in jam sessions but well out of the spotlight.

Isola was also active in the Cass Corridor area of Detroit in the 1970s playing jazz standards with pianist Bobby McDonald and others at Cobb's Corner Bar.

He worked as a drummer briefly at Captain Hornblower's in Key West, Florida, in the late 1980s with pianist Johnny Williams.

In 1993 he was playing weekly at Tom's Oyster Bar in Grosse Pointe MI. In 1994 and 1995 Isola played at The Windsor (Ontario) Jazz Festival, backing Franz Jackson and Marcus Belgrave. The 1994 concert was released on Parkwood Records as Live at Windsor Jazz Festival III with Jackson and Belgrave as co-leaders.

== Discography ==
With Stan Getz

- Interpretations by the Stan Getz Quintet (Norgran, 1955)
- At the Shrine (Norgran, 1955)
- Stan Getz Plays (Norgran, 1955)
- Stan Getz and the Cool Sounds (Verve, 1957)
- The Complete Roost Recordings (Blue Note, 1997)

With John Williams

- John Williams (EmArcy, 1954)
- John Williams Trio (EmArcy, 1955)

With others

- Mose Allison, Back Country Suite (Prestige, 1957)
- Bob Brookmeyer, Bob Brookmeyer Quartet (Pacific Jazz, 1954)
- Dick Garcia, A Message from Garcia (Dawn, 1956)
- Franz Jackson, The Fabulous Franz Jackson (Parkwood, 1998)
- Gerry Mulligan, Paris Concert (Pacific Jazz, 1955)
- Charlie Parker, Apartment Jam Sessions (Zim, 1977)
- Bob Szajner, Live at the Detroit Montreux Jazz Festival 1981 (Cadence Jazz, 2008)
