= Charlie Ventura =

American saxophonist and bandleader (1916–1992)

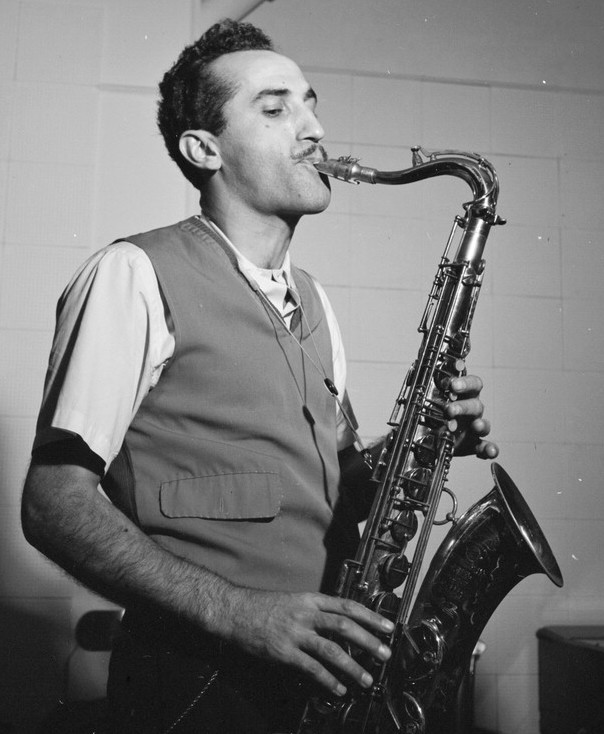
- Charlie Ventura in New York City, 1946; by William P. Gottlieb

Background information
- Born: Charles Venturo; December 2, 1916; Philadelphia, Pennsylvania, U.S.
- Died: January 17, 1992 (aged 75) Pleasantville, New Jersey, U.S.
- Genre: Jazz
- Occupation: Musician
- Instrument: Tenor saxophone
- Years active: 1940s–1980s
- Labels: Crystalette; Decca; EmArcy; GNP; Norgran; Baton; Tops; Regent; King; Brunswick; Craftsmen; Phoenix Jazz
- Formerly of: Gene Krupa; Teddy Powell; Big Four; Jackie Gleason
- Relatives: MJ Lenderman (great-grandson)

Charlie Ventura (born Charles Venturo; December 2, 1916 – January 17, 1992) was an American jazz tenor saxophonist and bandleader from Philadelphia, Pennsylvania.

== Career ==
During the 1940s, Ventura played saxophone for the bands of Gene Krupa and Teddy Powell. In 1945, he was named best tenor saxophonist by DownBeat magazine. He led a band which included Conte Candoli, Bennie Green, Boots Mussulli, Ed Shaughnessy, Jackie Cain, and Roy Kral. He led big bands in the 1940s and 1950s and formed the Big Four with Buddy Rich, Marty Napoleon, and Chubby Jackson. Ventura was a sideman with Krupa through the 1960s, then worked in Las Vegas with comedian Jackie Gleason.

Ventura died of lung cancer in 1992. His great-grandson is the musician MJ Lenderman.

== Discography ==
=== As leader ===
- Stomping with the Sax (Crystalette, 1950)
- Gene Norman Presents a Charlie Ventura Concert (Decca, 1953)
- F.Y.I. (EmArcy, 1954)
- In Concert (GNP, 1954)
- An Evening with Charlie Ventura and Mary Ann McCall (Norgran, 1954)
- Another Evening with Charlie Ventura and Mary Ann McCall (Norgran, 1954)
- Jumping with Ventura (EmArcy, 1955)
- An Evening with Mary Ann McCall and Charlie Ventura (Norgran, 1955)
- Charlie Ventura's Carnegie Hall Concert (Norgran, 1955)
- The New Charlie Ventura in Hi-Fi (Baton, 1956)
- Plays Hi-Fi Jazz (Tops, 1957)
- Crazy Rhythms (Regent, 1957)
- Adventure with Charlie (King, 1957)
- Here's Charlie (Brunswick, 1957)
- East of Suez (Regent, 1958)
- A Battle of Saxes (King, 1959)
- Plays for the People (Craftsmen, 1960)
- Live at the 3 Deuces! (Phoenix Jazz, 1975)
- Aces at the Deuces (Phoenix Jazz, 1976)

=== As sideman ===
- Dizzy Gillespie, The Complete RCA Victor Recordings (Bluebird, 1995)
- Gene Krupa, The Great New Gene Krupa Quartet Featuring Charlie Ventura (Verve, 1964)
