= Lardi =

Lardi is a surname. Notable people with the surname include:

- Federico Lardi (born 1985), Swiss ice hockey defenceman
- Kathrin Lardi (born 1942), Swiss athlete
- Piero Lardi Ferrari (born 1945), Italian billionaire businessman and sport personality
- Theresa Lardi Awuni (born 1979), Ghanaian politician
- Ursina Lardi (born 1970), Swiss actress
