= Regent Records (US) =

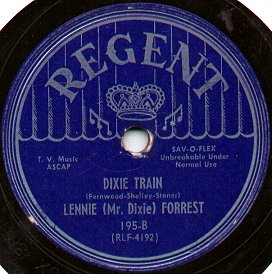
- Founded: 1947

Regent Records was an American record label in Newark, New Jersey. It was a subsidiary of Savoy from 1947 until 1964, specializing in jazz, rhythm and blues, pop, and rock and roll. The label was founded by Herman Lubinsky in 1947.

== Roster ==
- Pepper Adams
- Dorothy Ashby
- Mildred Bailey
- Milt Buckner
- Donald Byrd
- Joe Carroll
- Wild Bill Davison
- Dolly Dawn
- Billy Eckstine
- Tommy Flanagan
- Curtis Fuller
- Erroll Garner
- Dizzy Gillespie
- Jorgen Ingmann (as Jergen Ingman)
- John Jenkins
- J. J. Johnson
- Mary Ann McCall
- Johnny Otis
- Ben Pollack
- Sonny Red
- Shorty Rogers
- Annie Ross
- Charlie Ventura
- Frank Wess
- Joe Williams
- George Wright (organist, w/Cozy Cole, drums)

== See also ==
- List of record labels
- Regent Records (disambiguation)
