= Teddy Powell =

American jazz musician and bandleader (1905–1993)

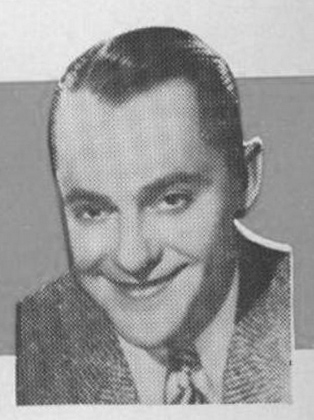

Background information
- Birth name: Teodoro Paolella
- Also known as: Freddy James
- Born: March 1, 1905 Oakland, California, U.S.
- Died: November 17, 1993 (aged 88) New York City, U.S.
- Genres: Jazz, swing
- Occupation(s): Musician, bandleader
- Instrument: Guitar
- Labels: Decca, Bluebird

Teddy Powell (born Teodoro Paolella; March 1, 1905 – November 17, 1993) was an American jazz musician, band leader, composer, and arranger. Some of his compositions were written under the pseudonym Freddy James.

Born in Oakland, California, Powell began playing violin when he was eight years old and picked up the banjo when he was fourteen. During the late 1920s to the early 1930s, he was a member of the Abe Lyman orchestra, taking on the additional tasks of gathering radio bands. He formed the Teddy Powell Orchestra in 1939 and it performed through the 1940s. Powell's sidemen included Tony Aless, Gus Bivona, Pete Candoli, Irving Fazola, and Charlie Ventura, but his best sideman left for better paying work.

"Snake Charmer", a song Powell published in 1937 (with lyrics by Leonard Whitcup), is still a popular song among partner dancers in Finland, where it is usually performed as a translation: "Kuningaskobra fi"). It placed 69th on the 1952–1959 Finnish charts, and is still being recorded by modern performers, as listed in the recordings database of the Finnish national broadcasting company Yle.

After the band folded, Powell wrote music and arrangements. He had hits with "Bewildered" and "If My Heart Could Only Talk". During the latter part of his career, he worked in music publishing.

Powell moved to Newark, New Jersey, where he opened his club Teddy P's. managed by Clarence Avant.
