= Skin Deep (Louis Bellson album) =

Studio album by Louis Bellson and His Orchestra
- Released: 1955
- Recorded: July 1953 and February 1954; Los Angeles, CA and New York City
- Genre: Jazz
- Label: Norgran; MGN 1046
- Producer: Norman Granz

Louis Bellson chronology
Skin Deep (1955)	Louis Bellson Quintet (1954)

Skin Deep is an album by American jazz drummer Louis Bellson featuring performances recorded in 1953 and 1954 for the Norgran label. The tracks were first released on the 10-inch LPs The Amazing Artistry of Louis Bellson and The Exciting Mr. Bellson.

== Reception ==
The Allmusic review awarded the album 3 stars, stating: "Louis Bellson has long been acknowledged as one of the greatest drummers in jazz history and this release combines two separate sessions that are predominantly features for his incredible solos".

Professional ratings
Review scores
Source	Rating
Allmusic	3/5 stars

== Track listing ==
All compositions by Louis Bellson except as indicated

1. "Skin Deep" – 7:52
2. "Claxton Hall Swing" – 2:59
3. "Phalanges" (Clark Terry, Louis Bellson) – 3:18
4. "For Europeans Only" (Tadd Dameron, Don Redman) – 3:03
5. "Copasetic" (Ralph Martin, Don Elliott) – 4:56
6. "Fascinating Rhythm" (George Gershwin, Ira Gershwin) – 4:16
7. "Percussionistically Speaking" – 7:58
8. "All God's Chillun Got Rhythm" (Walter Jurmann, Gus Kahn, Bronisław Kaper) – 2:55
9. "Loris" (Joe Puma) – 3:57
10. "A Pearl for Louie" (Ralph Martin) – 3:54
- Recorded in Los Angeles CA in July 1953 (tracks 1–4) and New York City in February 1954 (tracks 5–10)

== Personnel ==
- Louis Bellson – drums
- Harry Edison, Maynard Ferguson, Conrad Gozzo, Ray Linn – trumpet (tracks 1–4)
- Don Elliott – trumpet, mellophone, vibraphone, bongos (tracks 5–10)
- Hoyt Bohannon, Herb Harper, Tommy Pederson – trombone (tracks 1–4)
- Benny Carter, Willie Smith – alto saxophone (tracks 1–4)
- Wardell Gray, Bumps Myers – tenor saxophone (tracks 1–4)
- Bob Lawson – baritone saxophone (tracks 1–4)
- Ralph Martin (tracks 5–10), Jimmy Rowles (tracks 1–4) – piano
- Barney Kessel (tracks 1–4), Joe Puma (tracks 5–10) – guitar
- Bob Peterson (tracks 5–10), John Simmons (tracks 1–4) – bass
