= Louis Bellson Quintet =

Studio album by Louis Bellson Quintet
- Released: 1955
- Recorded: June 21, 1954; New York City
- Genre: Jazz
- Label: Norgran; MGN 1011
- Producer: Norman Granz

Louis Bellson chronology
Skin Deep (1953-54)	Louis Bellson Quintet (1955)	Journey Into Love (1954)

Concerto for Drums by Louis Bellson cover

Louis Bellson Quintet (also released as Concerto for Drums by Louis Bellson) is an album by American jazz drummer Louis Bellson featuring performances recorded in 1954 for the Norgran label.

== Reception ==
Allmusic awarded the album 4½ stars.

Professional ratings
Review scores
Source	Rating
Allmusic	4.5/5 stars

== Track listing ==
All compositions by Louis Bellson except as indicated

1. "Concerto for Drums" - 6:03
2. "Basically Speaking, Duvivier, That is" (George Duvivier) - 4:07
3. "Love for Sale" (Cole Porter) - 4:23
4. "The Man I Love" (George Gershwin, Ira Gershwin) - 5:38
5. "Charlie's Blues" (Charlie Shavers) - 5:14
6. "I'll Remember April" (Gene de Paul, Patricia Johnston, Don Raye) - 3:38
7. "Buffalo Joe" (Shavers) - 5:34
8. "Stompin' at the Savoy" (Edgar Sampson, Benny Goodman, Chick Webb, Andy Razaf) - 8:35

== Personnel ==
- Louis Bellson – drums
- Charlie Shavers – trumpet
- Zoot Sims – tenor saxophone
- Don Abney – piano
- George Duvivier – bass
