= Danny Bank =

American jazz musician (1922–2010)

- Born: Daniel Bernard Bank; July 17, 1922
- Died: June 5, 2010 (aged 87)
- Genres: Jazz
- Instruments: Clarinet; saxophones; flute

Daniel Bernard Bank (July 17, 1922 – June 5, 2010) was an American jazz saxophonist, clarinetist, and flautist. He is credited on some releases as Danny Banks.

== Early life ==
He was born on July 17, 1922.

== Professional career ==
Early in his career, Bank played with Charlie Barnet (1942–1944), and would return to play with him repeatedly over the next few decades. He played with Benny Goodman, Tommy and Jimmy Dorsey, Artie Shaw and Paul Whiteman in the 1940s.

Following this, he recorded with Charlie Parker, Rex Stewart, the Sauter-Finegan Orchestra, Johnny Hodges, Urbie Green, Clifford Brown and Helen Merrill, Art Farmer, Wes Montgomery, Quincy Jones, Jimmy Smith, Chico O’Farrill, Betty Carter, Ray Charles, and Tony Fruscella.

Bank is best known for his association with Miles Davis in Gil Evans's orchestra; Bank played bass clarinet on the albums Miles Ahead, Sketches of Spain and Porgy and Bess. He played with Davis on his 1961 Carnegie Hall concert. Later in the 1960s, he recorded with the big bands of Charles Mingus, Sonny Rollins, and Stanley Turrentine. He was also an original member of The New York Saxophone Quartet, along with Ray Beckenstein, Eddie Caine and Al Epstein.

== Death ==
Bank died of natural causes on June 5, 2010, at the age of 87.

== Discography ==
=== As sideman ===
With Louis Armstrong

- Louis Armstrong and His Friends (Flying Dutchman/Amsterdam, 1970)

With Bob Brookmeyer

- Portrait of the Artist (Atlantic, 1960)

With Ralph Burns and Leonard Feather

- Winter Sequence (MGM, 1954)

With Benny Carter

- Central City Sketches (MusicMasters, 1987)
- Harlem Renaissance (MusicMasters, 1992)

With Miles Davis

- Miles Ahead (Columbia, 1957)

With Art Farmer

- The Art Farmer Septet (Prestige, 1953–54)
- Listen to Art Farmer and the Orchestra (Mercury, 1962)

With Maynard Ferguson

- Ridin' High (Enterprise, 1967)

With Dizzy Gillespie

- Afro (Norgran, 1954)
- Dizzy and Strings (Norgran, 1954)

With Benny Golson

- Pop + Jazz = Swing (Audio Fidelity, 1961)

With Urbie Green

- All About Urbie Green and His Big Band (ABC-Paramount, 1956)

With Chico Hamilton

- The Further Adventures of El Chico (Impulse!, 1966)
- The Gamut (Solid State, 1968)

With Coleman Hawkins

- The Hawk Talks (Decca, 1952-53 [1955])

With Jimmy Heath

- Little Man Big Band (Verve, 1992)

With Johnny Hodges

- Blue Notes (Verve, 1966)
- Don't Sleep in the Subway (Verve, 1967)
- 3 Shades of Blue (Flying Dutchman, 1970)

With Milt Jackson

- Ray Brown / Milt Jackson with Ray Brown (Verve, 1965)

With J. J. Johnson

- Goodies (RCA Victor, 1965)
- Broadway Express (RCA Victor, 1965)

With Quincy Jones

- The Birth of a Band! (Mercury, 1959)

With Eric Kloss

- Grits & Gravy (Prestige, 1966)

With Irene Kral

- SteveIreneo! (United Artists, 1959)

With Junior Mance

- The Soul of Hollywood (Jazzland, 1962)

With Herbie Mann

- Latin Mann (Columbia, 1965)

With Howard McGhee

- Life Is Just a Bowl of Cherries (Bethlehem, 1956)

With Charles Mingus

- The Complete Town Hall Concert (Blue Note, 1962 [1994])

With Milton Nascimento

- Courage (A&M/CTI, 1969)

With Oliver Nelson

- Oliver Nelson Plays Michelle (Impulse!, 1966)
- Happenings with Hank Jones (Impulse!, 1966)
- Encyclopedia of Jazz (Verve, 1966)
- The Sound of Feeling (Verve, 1966)
- The Spirit of '67 with Pee Wee Russell (Impulse!, 1967)

With Charlie Parker

- Big Band (Clef, 1954)

With Oscar Pettiford

- Basically Duke (Bethlehem, 1954)
- The Oscar Pettiford Orchestra in Hi-Fi (ABC-Paramount, 1956)

With Lalo Schifrin and Bob Brookmeyer

- Samba Para Dos (Verve, 1963)

With Shirley Scott

- Roll 'Em: Shirley Scott Plays the Big Bands (Impulse!, 1966)

With Jimmy Smith

- Monster (Verve, 1965)

With Walter Wanderley

- Moondreams (A&M/CTI, 1969)

With Ben Webster

- Music for Loving (Norgran, 1954)

With Randy Weston

- Tanjah (Polydor, 1973)

With Kai Winding

- Kai Olé (Verve, 1961)
- Penny Lane & Time (Verve, 1967)
