= Journey into Love =

Studio album by Louis Bellson and Buddy Baker
- Released: 1955
- Recorded: August 30 – September 1, 1954
- Studio: LA
- Genre: Jazz
- Label: Norgran; MGN 1007
- Producer: Norman Granz

Louis Bellson chronology
| Louis Bellson Quintet (1954) | Journey into Love (1955) | The Driving Louis Bellson (1955) |

Two in Love

Journey into Love is an album by American jazz drummer Louis Bellson recorded on August 30 and September 1, 1954 and released on Norgran the following year.

== Background ==
The album is unique among Bellson's catalog as it features orchestral arrangements by Bellson and Buddy Baker of mood music and was also released as Two in Love under Baker's name in 1956.

== Reception ==
Professional ratings
Review scores
| Source | Rating |
|---|---|
| AllMusic | 3/5 stars |

AllMusic awarded the album 3 stars.

== Track listing ==
All compositions by Louis Bellson, except as noted.

1. "Lonesome" (Buddy Baker, Louis Bellson)
2. "Mirror on the Water"
3. "Javille"
4. "Can This Be True" (Baker, Bellson)
5. "Unforgettable" (Irving Gordon)
6. "Be My Pretty Flower"
7. "Dancing on a Moonbeam"
8. "Don't Be Afraid to Love Me" (Bellson, Pearl Bailey)
9. "Out of This World" (Harold Arlen, Johnny Mercer)
10. "Love Me Forever"

== Personnel ==
- Louis Bellson – drums, arranger
- Juan Tizol – valve trombone
- George Poole – flute
- Willie Smith – alto saxophone
- Ernie Hughes – piano
- Buddy Baker – conductor, arranger
  - string section
