= Marty Napoleon =

American jazz pianist (1921–2015)

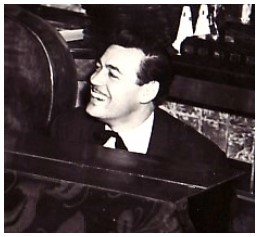
- Marty Napoleon (1952)

Background information
- Born: Matthew Napoli; June 2, 1921; Brooklyn, New York, U.S.
- Died: April 27, 2015 (aged 93) Glen Cove, New York, U.S.
- Genres: Jazz
- Occupation: Musician
- Instrument: Piano
- Years active: 1940s–2012

Marty Napoleon (June 2, 1921 – April 27, 2015) was an American jazz pianist. He replaced Earl Hines in Louis Armstrong's All Stars band in 1952. In 1946 he worked with Gene Krupa and went on to work with his uncle Phil Napoleon, a trumpeter, in Phil's Original Memphis Five. In the 1950s he also worked with his brother Teddy Napoleon, a pianist, and from 1966 to 1971 he performed with Armstrong again. One highlight of his work with Armstrong was a swing version of "Sunrise, Sunset", from the musical Fiddler on the Roof. Napoleon was born Matthew Napoli in Brooklyn to Sicilian immigrants; he later legally changed his name.

== Discography ==
=== As leader ===
- Marty Napoleon Swings and Sings (Bethlehem, 1955)
- Marty Napoleon and His Music (Stere-o-Craft, 1958)
- We 3...A Jazz Apprto Stereo (Everest, 1959)
- The Napoleon Brothers: A Rare Musical Vintage (Herald, 1958)
- Lionel Hampton Presents: Who's Who In Jazz Louis Armstrong Alumni (Who's Who in Jazz, 1977)

=== As sideman ===
- Louis Armstrong, Louis (Mercury, 1966)
- Louis Armstrong, What a Wonderful World (Stateside, 1968)
- Louis Armstrong, The Night Before Christmas (Continental, 1971)
- Phil Bodner, Fine and Dandy (Stash, 1981)
- Ruby Braff, Swinging with Ruby Braff (Jazztone, 1955)
- Ruby Braff, Easy Now (RCA Victor, 1959)
- Chubby Jackson, Chubby Jackson Discovers Maria Marshall (Crown, 1961)
