= Interpretations by the Stan Getz Quintet =

Studio album by Stan Getz
- Released: 1954
- Recorded: July 30 and August 15 & 22, 1953; Los Angeles, California
- Genre: Jazz
- Label: Norgran Records; MGN 1000
- Producer: Norman Granz

Stan Getz chronology
West Coast Live (1953)	Interpretations by the Stan Getz Quintet (1954)	Interpretations by the Stan Getz Quintet#2 (1954)

Interpretations by the Stan Getz Quintet is an album by saxophonist Stan Getz recorded in 1953. It was the first 12-inch LP released on the Norgran label in 1954.

== Reception ==
The Allmusic review awarded the album 3 stars.

Professional ratings
Review scores
Source	Rating
Allmusic	3/5 stars

== Track listing ==
1. "Love and the Weather" (Irving Berlin) - 6:32
2. "Spring Is Here" (Richard Rodgers, Lorenz Hart) - 6:07
3. "Pot Luck" (Johnny Mandel) - 3:55
4. "Willow Weep for Me" (Ann Ronell) - 5:22
5. "Crazy Rhythm" (Joseph Meyer, Roger Wolfe Kahn, Irving Caesar) - 5:53
6. "The Nearness of You" (Hoagy Carmichael, Ned Washington) - 3:43
- Recorded in Los Angeles, California on July 30, 1953 (tracks 1, 2 & 5), August 15, 1953 (track 4) and August 22, 1953 (tracks 3 & 6)

== Personnel ==
- Stan Getz - tenor saxophone
- Bob Brookmeyer - valve trombone
- John Williams - piano
- Teddy Kotick - bass
- Frank Isola - drums
