= Wade Legge =

American jazz musician

Wade Legge (February 4, 1934, Huntington, West Virginia – August 29, 1963, Buffalo, New York) was an American jazz pianist and bassist.

== About ==
Wade Legge was born in Huntington, West Virginia, but soon thereafter moved to Buffalo, New York with his parents, both of whom were musicians. Legge played more bass than piano in his early years, and it was with the bass that he was first noticed by Milt Jackson, who recommended him to Dizzy Gillespie. Gillespie hired him and shortly thereafter moved him to piano; he remained a member of Gillespie's ensemble until 1954, and during that time recorded a date in France as a trio session leader recorded by Vogue and leased to Blue Note.

Following his tenure with Gillespie, Legge moved to New York City and freelanced there. He played in Johnny Richards's orchestra, and appeared on sessions with Charles Mingus, Sonny Rollins, Joe Roland, Bill Hardman, Pepper Adams, Jimmy Knepper, and Jimmy Cleveland. Legge was one of three pianists who recorded with Gryce/Byrd Jazz Lab Quintets during 1957 and appeared on more than 50 recordings before returning to Buffalo in 1959. In August 1963, Wade Legge died of a bleeding stomach ulcer. He was 29 years old.

== Discography ==
=== As leader ===
- Wade Legge Trio (Blue Note BLP 5031, 1953, possibly issued 1954) (leased from French Vogue)

=== As sideman ===
With Jimmy Cleveland

- Introducing Jimmy Cleveland and His All Stars (EmArcy, 1955)

With Dizzy Gillespie

- The Great Blue Star Sessions 1952-1953 (EmArcy, 1952-53 [2004])
- Afro (Norgran, 1954)
- Dizzy and Strings (Norgran, 1954)
- Jazz Recital (Norgran, 1955)

With Gigi Gryce

- Jazz Lab (Columbia, 1957) – with Donald Byrd
- Gigi Gryce and the Jazz Lab Quintet (Riverside, 1957)

With Milt Jackson

- Meet Milt Jackson (Savoy, 1956)
- Roll 'Em Bags (Savoy, 1956)

With Jackie McLean

- Alto Madness (Prestige, 1957) – with John Jenkins

With Charles Mingus

- The Clown (Atlantic, 1957)
- Tonight at Noon (Atlantic, 1957-1961)

With Joe Roland

- Joltin' Joe Roland (Savoy, 1955)

With Sonny Rollins

- Rollins Plays for Bird (Prestige, 1956)
- Sonny Boy (Prestige, 1956 [1961])
