= Zardi's Jazzland =

Zardi's (also Zardi's Jazzland) was a venue for jazz music in Los Angeles, from the beginning of the 1950s to 1957.

Zardi's was located on Hollywood Boulevard in the Hollywood and Vine district. Well-known musicians such as Bob Brookmeyer, Stan Getz, Jimmy Giuffre, Oscar Peterson, Art Tatum, and Cal Tjader, whose concert at Zardi's was discussed in the 1956 Down Beat, played there at the beginning of the 1950s. Regular guests included, among others, the young composer La Monte Young. In the course of its existence concerts at Zardi's were recorded by Oscar Peterson, Sarah Vaughan, Earl Bostic, and Buddy DeFranco. Herb Geller dedicated his composition Tardi for Zardi's, based on the chord progressions of All God's Children Got Rhythm, to the club. In early 1956, there was a live weekly television series entitled Tonight at Zardi's, which began with a concert by the Stan Kenton Orchestra. In the mid-1950s several jazz clubs in Los Angeles, including The Haig and the Tiffany Club, opened near Zardi's.

== Discography ==
- Oscar Peterson: At Zardi's, Pablo Records 1955 (1986 ed.)
- Ella at Zardi's, Universal Music, Verve Records, December 1, 2017

== Literature ==
- Ted Gioia: West Coast Jazz: Modern Jazz in California, 1945–1960. New York: Oxford University Press, 1992.
