= Mary Ann McCall =

American jazz musician

- Born: May 4, 1919; Philadelphia, Pennsylvania, U.S.
- Died: December 14, 1994 (aged 75); Los Angeles, California, U.S.
- Occupation: Singer

Mary Ann McCall (May 4, 1919 – December 14, 1994) was an American pop and jazz singer. Aside from solo work, she sang for Charlie Barnet, Tommy Dorsey, Stan Kenton, Artie Shaw, Teddy Powell, and Woody Herman.

== Early life ==
McCall was born in Philadelphia, Pennsylvania. As a child she had rickets, and used crutches. A doctor recommended dancing classes, which led her to a performing career.

== Career ==
McCall was described as a rising star in 1939. She sang with jazz bands led by Charlie Barnet, Tommy Dorsey, Stan Kenton, Artie Shaw, Teddy Powell, and Woody Herman. In 1949, she won the Down Beat Readers' Poll for "Girl Singer (With Band)".

McCall made several recordings in the 1940s and 1950s. Billboard magazine reviewed her 1947 recordings of "Money is Honey" and "On Time", praising her "torchy and scorchy pipes" and "real blues feeling." Woody Herman recalled that "she was truly a great jazz singer." In 1952, Jet magazine included McCall in a feature titled "Do White Singers Imitate Negroes?"

McCall experienced heroin addiction, was found guilty of drug possession in San Francisco in 1953, and spent 23 days in jail. In 1954, she toured the United States with Stan Kenton's Festival of Modern American Jazz. In 1960 she and the Barney Kessel Quintet played six nights in San Francisco. In 1973 she sang at an event in Sherman Oaks, sharing the stage with Sam Yorty, William Conrad, and Jerry Scoggins. In 1976 she performed at the Concord Summer Festival, with Jake Hanna's Kansas City Express. As late as 1985 she was still singing occasionally in clubs in Southern California.

=== Discography ===
- Mary McCall Sings (Discovery, 1950)
- An Evening with Charlie Ventura and Mary Ann McCall (Norgran, 1954)
- Another Evening with Charlie Ventura and Mary Ann McCall (Norgran, 1954)
- Easy Living (Regent, 1957)
- Detour to the Moon (Jubilee, 1958)
- Melancholy Baby (Coral, 1959)

=== As guest ===
- Jake Hanna, Kansas City Express (Concord Jazz, 1976)
- Nat Pierce, 5400 North (Hep, 1979)

== Personal life ==
McCall was briefly married to jazz saxophonist Al Cohn. She died in Los Angeles, California in 1994. Her son Don Siok was a professional golfer.
