= Thunderbird =

Thunderbird, thunder bird or thunderbirds most often refer to:

- Thunderbird (mythology), a legendary creature in certain North American indigenous peoples' history and culture

Thunderbird, thunder bird or thunderbirds may also refer to:

== Birds ==
- Dromornithidae, extinct flightless birds known as thunder birds
- Genyornis, extinct flightless birds known as thunder birds
- Rock ptarmigan, extant species of game bird known in Japan as the raichō (雷鳥) or "thunder bird"

== Arts, entertainment and media ==
=== Fictional characters ===
- Thunderbird, a creature in the game Zelda II: The Adventure of Link
- Thunderbird (James Proudstar), later known as Warpath, a Marvel Comics superhero introduced in 1984
- Thunderbird (John Proudstar), a Marvel Comics superhero introduced in 1975
- Thunderbird (Neal Shaara), a Marvel Comics superhero introduced in 2000

=== Film and television ===
- Thunder Birds (1942 film), an American World War II propaganda film
- Thunderbirds (1952 film), an American war film
- Thunderbirds (TV series), a 1960s British puppet science-fiction series
  - Thunderbirds Are Go, a 1966 film based on the British series
  - Thunderbird 6, a 1968 film sequel to Thunderbirds Are Go
  - Thunderbirds 2086, a 1980s Japanese anime inspired by the British TV series
  - Thunderbirds (2004 film), based on the British TV series
  - Thunderbirds Are Go (TV series), remake of the British TV series
- Thunderbird (2022 film), a South Korean film

=== Music ===
==== Instruments ====
- Gibson Thunderbird, a bass guitar

==== Bands ====
- The Fabulous Thunderbirds, American blues rock band
- The Thunderbirds, 1960s English band of Chris Farlowe
- The Thunderbirds, 1960s Hong Kong band of Robert Lee Jun-fai

==== Albums ====
- Thunderbird (Cassandra Wilson album), 2006
- Thunderbird (Louis Bellson album), 1965
- Thunderbird (Willis Jackson album), 1962

==== Songs ====
- "Thunderbird", by ZZ Top from Fandango!, 1975
- "Thunderbird", by Quiet Riot from Metal Health, 1983
- "Thunderbird", by Iron Savior from Condition Red, 2002
- "Thunderbirds" / "3AM", a single by Busted, 2004
- "Thunderbird", by They Might Be Giants from The Spine, 2004
- "Thunderbird", by Seasick Steve from I Started Out with Nothin and I Still Got Most of It Left, 2008
- "Thunderbird" (Call Me No One song), 2012
- "Thunderbird", by C418 from Excursions, 2018

=== Video games ===
- Thunderbirds (2000 video game), a Game Boy Color video game
- Thunderbirds (2004 video game), a Game Boy Advance video game

== Businesses and organisations ==
=== Hotels and motels ===
- Thunderbird Hotel, now El Rancho Hotel and Casino, Paradise, Nevada, U.S.
- Thunderbird Motel, a former Indian-themed motel in Minnesota, U.S.
- Thunderbird Motel, one of the Miami modern architecture buildings, Florida, U.S.
- Thunderbird Motel, now a Standard Hotel on Sunset Strip, Los Angeles, U.S.

=== Schools ===
- Thunderbird Adventist Academy, a high school in Scottsdale, Arizona, U.S.
- Thunderbird High School, Phoenix, Arizona, U.S.
- Thunderbird School of Global Management, at Arizona State University, U.S.

=== Other businesses and organisations ===
- Thunderbird Entertainment, a Canadian company

== Computing ==
- Athlon Thunderbird, a microprocessor by AMD
- Mozilla Thunderbird, an open-source personal information manager

== Military ==
- 45th Infantry Brigade Combat Team (United States), nicknamed Thunderbird
- No. 426 Thunderbird Squadron, of the Royal Canadian Air Force
- Thunderbird (aircraft), a surviving B-17 painted to replicate a high mission-tally B-17 of World War II
- Thunderbird (missile), a British Army missile in service circa 1959–1977
- Thunderbird Field No. 1 and Thunderbird Field No. 2, World War II airfields in Arizona, U.S.
- United States Air Force Thunderbirds, an air demonstration squadron

== Places ==
- Lake Thunderbird, Norman, Oklahoma, U.S.
- Thunderbird Archaeological District, Virginia, U.S.
- Thunderbird Glacier, Glacier National Park, Montana, U.S.
- Thunderbird Mesa, Monument Valley, Arizona
- Thunderbird Mountain, Glacier National Park, Montana, U.S.

== Sports ==
=== Ice hockey ===
- Carolina Thunderbirds, a former American ice hockey team
- Carolina Thunderbirds (FPHL), an American ice hockey team
- Dubuque Thunderbirds, a former American junior ice hockey team
- Sault Thunderbirds, a 1959–1962 Canadian ice hockey team
- Seattle Thunderbirds, an American ice hockey team
- Soo Thunderbirds, a Canadian ice hockey team
- Springfield Thunderbirds, an American ice hockey team

=== College sports ===
- Casper College Thunderbirds, sports team(s) of Casper College in Casper, Wyoming
- Southern Utah Thunderbirds, sports teams of Southern Utah University
- UBC Thunderbirds, the athletic teams of the University of British Columbia
  - Thunderbird Stadium, a stadium located by the University of British Columbia's main campus

=== Other sports ===
- Adelaide Thunderbirds, an Australian netball team
- Albuquerque Thunderbirds, a former American basketball team now known as the Cleveland Charge
- Hamilton Thunderbirds, former name of a Canadian baseball team
- Halifax Thunderbirds, a professional box lacrosse team in the National Lacrosse League
- Thunderbird Country Club, a golf course in Rancho Mirage, California, U.S.
- Thunderbird Soccer Club, a Taiwanese football club
- The Thunderbirds, organizers of the Phoenix Open golf tournament
- Franco Wanyama (born 1968), Ugandan retired boxer nicknamed Thunderbird

== Transportation ==
- Ford Thunderbird, a car
- Royal Enfield Thunderbird, an Indian motorcycle
- Thunderbird, a British Rail Class 57/3 diesel rescue locomotive
- Thunderbird (train), a Japanese limited express
- Thunderbird 26, a class of sailboat
- Thunderbird Boats, a 60's boat manufacturer now known as Formula Boats
- Thunderbird W-14, three-seat biplane of the 1920s
- Triumph Thunderbird (disambiguation), the name of several British motorcycles

== People ==
- Chief Thunderbird (1866–1946), a Native American actor of Cheyenne descent
- James "Thunderbird" Davis (1938–1992), an American guitarist, singer and songwriter
- Luiz Thunderbird (born 1961), a Brazilian musician, TV presenter, broadcaster, podcaster, YouTuber and DJ
- Franco Wanyama (born 1968), Ugandan retired boxer nicknamed "Thunderbird"

== Other uses ==
- Thunderbird (Holiday World), a roller coaster in Santa Claus, Indiana, U.S.
- Thunderbird (PowerPark), a roller coaster at PowerPark, Alahärmä, Finland
- Thunderbird (wine), a flavored fortified wine
- Project Thunderbird, a 1967 proposed nuclear detonation in Wyoming coal deposits as part of Project Plowshare

== See also ==
- Thunderbird Lodge (disambiguation)
- Thunderbird Park (disambiguation)
- T-Bird (disambiguation)
