= Crystal Bay =

Crystal Bay is the name of:

- Crystal Bay (Lake Superior), a bay in Minnesota
- Crystal Bay, Minnesota
- Crystal Bay Township, Lake County, Minnesota
- Crystal Bay, Nevada
