= Live from Chicago =

Live from Chicago may refer to:

- Live from Chicago, album by Oscar Peterson 1961
- Live from Chicago, album by Charlie Shavers 1962
- Live from Chicago, album by Steve Miller 2007
- Live from Chicago, album by Kool & the Gang 2007
- Live from Chicago, album by Hannibal Buress 2014
