= Lou Stein =

American jazz musician

Lou Stein (April 22, 1922 – December 11, 2002) was an American jazz pianist.

Born in Philadelphia, Pennsylvania, Stein joined Ray McKinley's band in 1942. He played with Glenn Miller when the latter was stateside during World War II.

After the war he worked with Charlie Ventura (1946–47) and became a session musician. He performed with the Lawson-Haggart Band, Benny Goodman, Sarah Vaughan, the Sauter-Finegan Orchestra, Louie Bellson, Red Allen, Coleman Hawkins, and Lester Young, and recorded as a bandleader. In 1957 he had a U.S. Top 40 hit with "Almost Paradise", which peaked at No. 31 on the Billboard Hot 100. His cover version of "Got a Match" made the Cashbox Top 60 in 1958. He played with Joe Venuti from 1969 to 1972.

== Discography ==
- Lou Stein Trio (Brunswick, 1954)
- House Hop (Epic, 1954)
- Lou Stein at Large! (Brunswick, 1954)
- Six for Kicks (Jubilee, 1954)
- The Lou Stein 3, 4, and 5 (Epic, 1955)
- Eight for Kicks, Four for Laughs (Jubilee, 1956)
- From Broadway to Paris (Epic, 1956)
- Honky Tonk Piano (Mercury, 1956)
- Introspective 1 (Leric, 1972)
- Tribute to Tatum (Chiaroscuro, 1976)
- Stompin' Em Down (Chiaroscuro, 1978)
- Lou Stein & Friends (World Jazz, 1980)
- Temple of the Gods (Chiaroscuro, 1980)
- Live at the Dome (Dreamstreet, 1981)
- Solo (Audiophile, 1984)
- Go Daddy! (Pullen Music, 1994)

=== As sideman ===
With Louis Bellson

- The Driving Louis Bellson (Norgran, 1955)
- Let's Call It Swing (Verve, 1956)
- Drummer's Holiday (Verve, 1958)

With Woody Herman

- Songs for Hip Lovers (Verve, 1957)

With Lee Konitz

- An Image: Lee Konitz with Strings (Verve, 1958)

With Joe Newman

- New Sounds in Swing with Billy Byers (Jazztone, 1956)

With Charlie Parker

- Big Band (Clef, 1954)

With Cootie Williams

- Cootie Williams in Hi-Fi (RCA Victor, 1958)

== Literature ==
- Leonard Feather & Ira Gitler, The Biographical Encyclopedia of Jazz. Oxford University Press: Oxford/New York 1999; ISBN 978-0-19-532000-8
