= Louis Bellson at The Flamingo =

Live album by Louis Bellson
- Released: 1958
- Recorded: November 11, 1957
- Venue: Flamingo Las Vegas
- Genre: Jazz
- Label: Verve; MGV 8256

Louis Bellson chronology
Music, Romance and Especially Love (1957)	Louis Bellson at The Flamingo (1958)	Drummer's Holiday (1958)

Louis Bellson at The Flamingo is a live album by American jazz drummer Louis Bellson featuring performances recorded in Las Vegas in 1957 for the Verve label.

== Reception ==
Professional ratings
Review scores
Source	Rating
AllMusic	3/5 stars

AllMusic awarded the album 3 stars.

== Track listing ==
All compositions by Louis Bellson except as indicated

1. "Flamingo Blues" - 6:34
2. "Driftwood" - 3:37
3. "Opus 7-11" - 9:54
4. "Broadway" (Billy Bird, Teddy McRae, Henri Woode) - 8:16
5. "Medley: Love Is Here to Stay/Flamingo/Makin' Whoopee" (George Gershwin, Ira Gershwin/Ted Grouya, Edmund Anderson/Walter Donaldson, Gus Kahn) - 4:47
6. "Sweet Georgia Brown" (Ben Bernie, Maceo Pinkard, Kenneth Casey) - 6:55

== Personnel ==
- Louis Bellson – drums
- Harry Edison - trumpet
- Don Abney - piano
- Truck Parham - bass
