= Aaron Sachs =

American jazz saxophone and clarinet player (1923-2014)

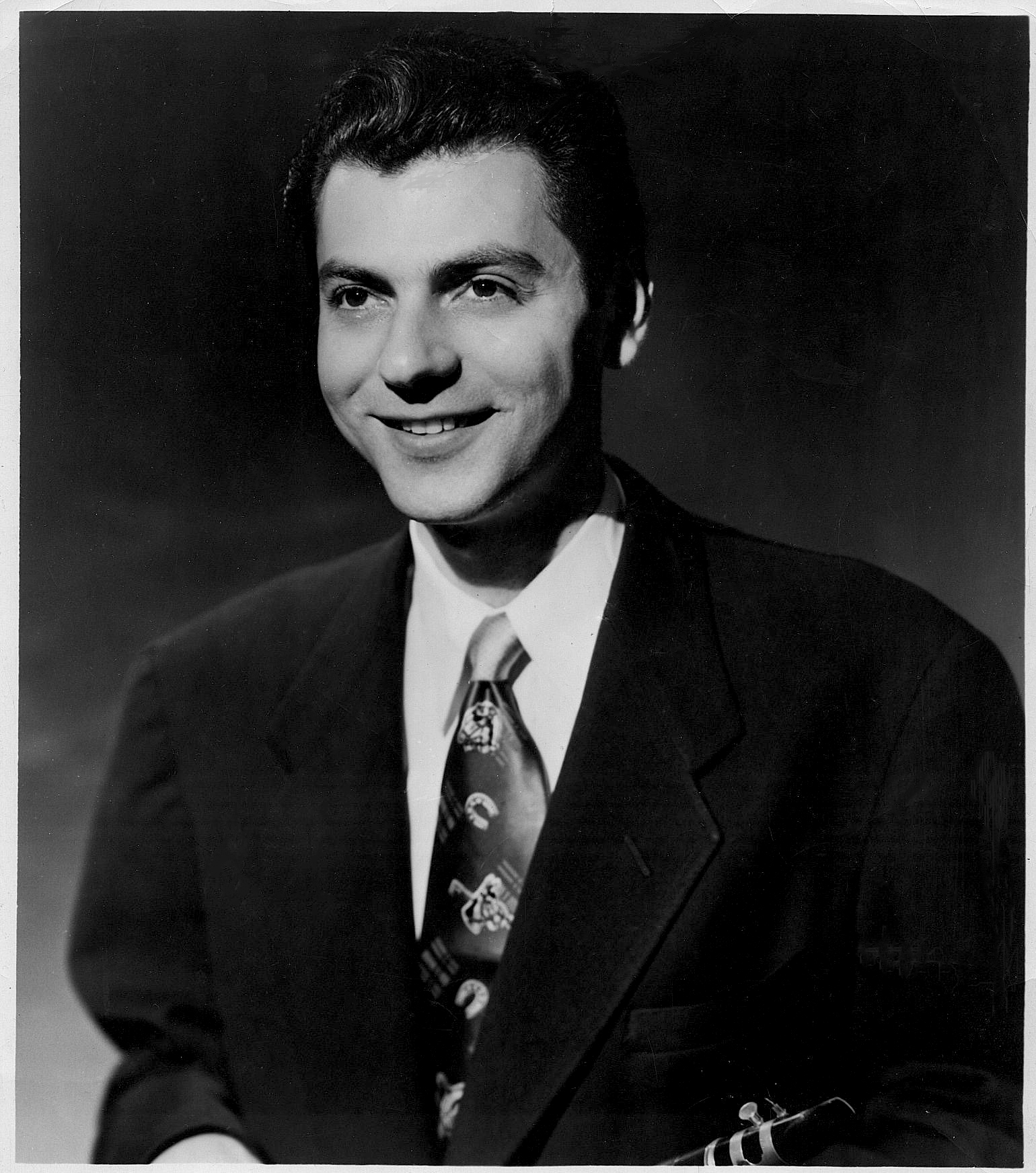

Background information
- Born: July 4, 1923; New York City
- Died: June 5, 2014 (aged 90) New York City
- Genres: Jazz, Latin jazz
- Occupation: Musician
- Instruments: Saxophone, clarinet
- Years active: 1940s–2000s
- Label: Bethlehem

Aaron Sachs (July 4, 1923 – June 5, 2014) was an American jazz saxophone and clarinet player.

== Career ==
A native of New York City, Sachs began his music career as a young swing protégé of Benny Goodman, and later eased into bebop music, also playing with Earl Hines. He then formed his own bands, recording and touring. He married singer Helen Merrill in 1948, a union which lasted only a few years. Their only child was Allan Preston Sachs, later known professionally as Alan Merrill.

In the 1960s, Aaron Sachs worked in Latin bands with Machito, Tito Puente, and Tito Rodríguez. He wrote the hit song "El Mundo De Las Locas" for Rodríguez. He worked with Stan Getz, Sarah Vaughan, Chet Baker, Billie Holiday, Red Norvo, Gene Krupa, Anita O'Day, and Cozy Cole. He died in New York City on June 5, 2014, at the age of 90.

== Discography ==
=== As leader ===
- Quintette (Bethlehem, 1955)
- Clarinet and Co. (Rama, 1957)

=== As sideman ===
- Louie Bellson, The Brilliant Bellson Sound (Verve, 1959)
- Earl Hines, Varieties! (Xanadu, 1985)
- Gene Krupa, Drummer Man Gene Krupa in Highest Fi (Verve, 1956)
- John Lewis, The Modern Jazz Society Presents a Concert of Contemporary Music (Norgran, 1956)
- Machito, World's Greatest Latin Band (GNP Crescendo, 1962)
- Shelly Manne, Shelly Manne & Co. (Contact, 1965)
- Specs Powell, Movin' In (Roulette, 1957)
- Tom Talbert, Bix Duke Fats (Atlantic, 1957)
- Red Norvo and His Orchestra, Town Hall Jazz Concert 1945 (Atlantic, 1973; re-issue of Commodore original)
