= Mahlon Clark =

- Born: March 7, 1923; Portsmouth, Virginia, United States
- Died: September 20, 2007 (aged 84)
- Occupation: Big band musician
- Instruments: Clarinet, saxophone
- Years active: circa 1933–2007
- Formerly of: Lawrence Welk Orchestra

Mahlon Clark (March 7, 1923 – September 20, 2007) was an American musician who was a member of the Lawrence Welk orchestra from 1962 to 1968. His primary instrument was the clarinet.

== Biography ==
Born and raised in Portsmouth, Virginia, Clark started out in vaudeville as a child. At age 16, Clark became a professional big band musician with the Dean Hudson Band, followed by stints with the Will Bradley Band and the Ray McKinley Band. Beginning in 1942, Clark served in the U.S. Merchant Marine and was stationed on Santa Catalina Island, where he played in a merchant marine band. After the war, he worked as a session musician with the permanent orchestra at Paramount Studios where he performed music on many movie soundtracks.

He was hired by Welk in 1962 to join his orchestra and his television show. For six years, he played clarinet, saxophone and flute for a weekly national television audience and on stage when the Musical Family went out on tour. Dave Edwards joined the Lawrence Welk Show orchestra in early 1968 and replaced Mahlon Clark in the reed section. After leaving the Welk organization, Clark continued to perform on many more movie soundtracks and with numerous artists such as Frank Sinatra and Madonna.

== Personal life ==
He was married twice, first to big band vocalist Imogene Lynn, whom he met while with Ray McKinley's band and later to Kathy Lennon of the Lennon Sisters.

== Discography ==
With Louis Bellson

- Louis Bellson Swings Jule Styne (Verve, 1960)
- Clarinetist for "Members of the Benny Goodman Orchestra" recordings for Crown Records 1960s-late 1970s.
