= Truck Parham =

American jazz double-bassist (1911–2002)

Charles Valdez "Truck" Parham
- Born: January 25, 1911; Chicago, Illinois, US
- Died: June 5, 2002 (aged 91) Chicago
- Genres: Jazz
- Occupations: Musician, boxer, American football player
- Instrument: Double-bass

Charles Valdez "Truck" Parham (January 25, 1911 – June 5, 2002) was an American jazz double-bassist.

Parham was born in Chicago and was first a professional sportsman: he was a boxer and played football with the Chicago Negro All Stars. He played drums before settling on bass, and studied under Walter Page. He was part of Zack Whyte's band in 1932–34, playing primarily in Cincinnati, but was mostly a singer and valet for the band, the latter activity giving rise to his nickname. After returning to Chicago, he played with Zutty Singleton, Roy Eldridge (1936–38), Art Tatum, and Bob Shoffner in the 1930s. In 1940 he joined Earl Hines's orchestra, where he remained for two years; in 1942 he was hired by Jimmie Lunceford and played with him until 1947.

Parham continued to play revival gigs with Muggsy Spanier (1950–55), Herbie Fields (1956–57), Hines again, and Louie Bellson. He spent much of the 1960s working with Art Hodes, and played in numerous Dixieland jazz groups later in his career. Parham never recorded as a leader, though he recorded profusely as a sideman. He continued playing into the 2000s, being a member of Franz Jackson's band in 2000. Parham died in Chicago on June 5, 2002.

== Discography ==
With Louis Bellson

- Drumorama! (Verve, 1957)
- Louis Bellson at The Flamingo (Verve, 1957)
- The Brilliant Bellson Sound (Verve, 1959)

With Art Hodes

- Hodes' Art (Delmark, 1968–72)
- Friar's Inn Revisited (Delmark, 1968–72)
