= W14 =

W14 may refer to:

- British NVC community W14, a woodland community in the British National Vegetation Classification system
- Cierva W.14 Skeeter, a helicopter
- London Buses route W14
- McCormick W-14, a farm tractor
- Mercedes W14, a Formula One car
- Nhanda language
- Rhombicosidodecahedron
- Route W14 (WMATA), a bus route in Maryland
- Thunderbird W-14, an American civil transport plane
- W14, a postcode district in London, England
