= Tom Talbert =

Thomas Robert Talbert (August 4, 1924 Crystal Bay, Minnesota – July 2, 2005 Los Angeles) was an American jazz pianist, composer, and band leader.

== Biography ==
He was born on August 4, 1924, in Crystal Bay, Minnesota, and grew up listening to big band music on the radio.

He got started as a band leader when he was drafted in the Army in 1943, becoming composer for a military band at Fort Ord, California, performing for War Bond drives throughout California.

In the late 1940s, he led his own big band on the West Coast, much of his work foreshadowing what became known as West Coast jazz before moving to New York in the early 1950s after being denied a recording contract in LA

In 1956, he recorded two records that would become his best known works, Wednesday's Child and Bix Duke Fats, gaining him fleeting fame.

When rock and roll eclipsed jazz in popularity, he moved to his parents' home in Minnesota in 1960, tried his hand at cattle ranching in Wisconsin, before eventually moving back to Los Angeles and a musical career in 1975.

In addition to composing for TV and movie studios, he became involved in music education, and set up a foundation to help talented young musicians, with one of the first recipients (in 1996) being Maria Schneider.

He died July 2, 2005.

== Co-workers ==
Talbert has worked together with many other famous musicians. Some include:

Los Angeles in the 40s:

- Johnny Richards
- Lucky Thompson
- Dodo Marmarosa
- Hal McKusick
- Al Killian
- Art Pepper
- Steve White
- Claude Williamson

New York in the 50s:

- Marian McPartland
- Kai Winding
- Don Elliott
- Johnny Smith
- Oscar Pettiford
- Herb Geller
- Joe Wilder
- Eddie Bert
- Barry Galbraith
- Aaron Sachs
- Claude Thornhill

== Selected discography ==
As sideman

With the Boyd Raeburn Orchestra
- AFRS Downbeat, Los Angeles, early 1946, Memphis in June OCLC 13838357
- Club Morocco, Hollywood, January 1946 OCLC 8255365
- AFRS Jubilee #169, Hollywood, California, early February 1946 OCLC 54356249
- Hollywood, February 5, 1946
With Johnny Richards
- probably Los Angeles, c. 1954

Note: no details except Tom Talbert, arranger

With Patty McGovern, accompanied by the Tom Talbert Orchestra
- New York, August 1956, Wednesday's Child, Atlantic OCLC 15805126, 740390726

As leader

- Los Angeles, June 25, 1946
- Los Angeles, December 31, 1947
- Los Angeles, August 1949
- Los Angeles, November 1949
- New York, August 24, 1956, Bix, Duke, Fats, Atlantic OCLC 33937105, 46999534, 472842077 OCLC 763106979
- New York, September 7, 1956
- New York, September 14, 1956
- Hollywood, October 3, 4 & 5, 1977, Louisiana Suite
- Hollywood, August 11 & 12, 1987, Things As They Are, The Tom Talbert Septet
- Rendezvous Ballroom, Newport Beach, California, 30 May 30, 1991 – 3 June 1991, Stan Kenton Celebration, Tom Talbert Jazz Orchestra OCLC 48578850
- Hollywood, October 1991, Duke's Domain OCLC 38404141, 472842105
- Hollywood, October 10, 1991, The Warm Cafe OCLC 35053937, 472806441
- Hollywood, May 18, 1992
- Hollywood June 1992
- Hollywood, June 2, 1992
- Alhambra, California, May 18 & 19, 1993
- New York, July 1, 7 & 8, 1997, This Is Living! OCLC 42890337
- Clinton Recording Studios, New York City, December 9, 10 & 11, 1999, To a lady: discover jazz with the Tom Talbert Orchestra OCLC 53348537
