= The Brilliant Bellson Sound =

Studio album by Louis Bellson His Drums and Orchestra
- Released: 1960
- Recorded: July 20 and August 10, 1959 a Los Angeles, CA
- Genre: Jazz
- Label: Verve; MGV 2123/MGVS 6093

Louis Bellson chronology
Drummer's Holiday (1958)	The Brilliant Bellson Sound (1960)	Louis Bellson Swings Jule Styne (1960)

The Brilliant Bellson Sound is an album by American jazz drummer Louis Bellson featuring performances recorded in 1959 for the Verve label.

== Reception ==
Professional ratings
Review scores
Source	Rating
AllMusic	3/5 stars
DownBeat	3/5 stars

AllMusic awarded the album 3 stars.

== Track listing ==
All compositions by Louis Bellson except as indicated

1. "Drum Foolery" - 5:28
2. "It's Music Time" - 2:14
3. "Blast Off" (Aaron Sachs) - 2:17
4. "Don't Be That Way" (Edgar Sampson, Mitchell Parish, Benny Goodman) - 2:31
5. "The Hawk Talks" - 2:33
6. "Summer Night" (Harry Warren, Al Dubin) - 2:09
7. "Satin Doll" (Duke Ellington, Billy Strayhorn, Johnny Mercer) - 2:53
8. "It Don't Mean a Thing (If It Ain't Got That Swing)" (Ellington, Irving Mills) - 2:30
9. "Speak Low" (Kurt Weill, Ogden Nash) - 3:03
10. "You Are My Lucky Star" (Nacio Herb Brown, Arthur Freed) - 2:32
11. "So Long Blues" - 5:19

== Personnel ==
- Louis Bellson – drums
- John Audino, Guido Basso, Ralph Clark, Fred Thompson - trumpet
- Nick Di Maio, Earl Swope - trombone
- Juan Tizol - valve trombone
- Joseph De Angelis - French horn
- Herb Geller, Oliver Nelson - alto saxophone
- George Nicholas - tenor saxophone
- Aaron Sachs - tenor saxophone, clarinet
- George Perry - baritone saxophone
- Lawrence Lucie, Tony Rizzi - guitar
- Ed Diamond - piano
- Truck Parham - bass
- Jack Arnold - boobam
- Jack Arnold (track 10), Louis Bellson (track 11), Ed Diamond (track 8), Bob Florence (tracks 5–7), Marty Paich (track 1), Aaron Sachs (track 3), Ernie Wilkins (tracks 2, 4 & 9) - arranger
