= Louis Bellson Swings Jule Styne =

Studio album by Louis Bellson
- Released: 1960
- Recorded: February 1, 2 & 3, 1960; Radio Recorders, Los Angeles, CA
- Genre: Jazz
- Label: Verve; MGV 2131/MGVS 6138

Louis Bellson chronology
The Brilliant Bellson Sound (1959)	Louis Bellson Swings Jule Styne (1960)	Big Band Jazz from the Summit (1962)

Louis Bellson Swings Jule Styne is an album by American jazz drummer Louis Bellson featuring performances of tunes written by Jule Styne recorded in 1960 for the Verve label.

== Reception ==
Professional ratings
Review scores
Source	Rating
Allmusic	3/5 stars

AllMusic awarded the album 3 stars.

== Track listing ==
1. "My Little Yellow Dress" (Jule Styne, Betty Comden, Adolph Green)
2. "Time After Time" (Styne, Sammy Cahn)
3. "Sunday" (Styne, Chester Conn, Bennie Krueger, Ned Miller)
4. "I'll Walk Alone" (Styne, Cahn)
5. "Just In Time" (Styne, Comden, Green)
6. "Bye Bye Baby" (Styne, Leo Robin)
7. "Everything's Coming up Roses" (Styne, Stephen Sondheim)
8. "I've Heard That Song Before" (Styne, Cahn)
9. "As Long As There's Music" (Styne, Cahn)
10. "Three Coins in the Fountain" (Styne, Cahn)
11. "The Things We Did Last Summer" (Styne, Cahn)
12. "Let It Snow! Let It Snow! Let It Snow!" (Styne, Cahn)
- Recorded in Los Angeles, CA on February 1 (tracks 3, 5, 8 & 9), February 2 (tracks 4, 7, 11 & 12) and February 3 (tracks 1, 2, 6 & 10), 1960

== Personnel ==
- Louis Bellson – drums
- Frank Beach, Don Fagerquist, Bob Fowler, Melvin Moore - trumpet
- Nick DiMaio, Dick Noel - trombone
- George Roberts - bass trombone
- Juan Tizol - valve trombone
- Mahlon Clark, Bill Green - alto saxophone
- Buddy Collette - tenor saxophone, flute
- Chuck Gentry - baritone saxophone
- Jeff Clarkson - piano
- Tony Rizzi - guitar
- Joe Mondragon - bass
- Milt Holland - percussion
