= Songs for Hip Lovers =

Studio album by Woody Herman
- Released: 1957
- Recorded: January–March 1957
- Genre: Jazz
- Length: 38:15
- Label: Verve MGV 2069
- Producer: Norman Granz

Woody Herman chronology
Songs for Tired Lovers (1955)	Songs for Hip Lovers (1957)	Early Autumn (1959)

Professional ratings
Review scores
Source	Rating
AllMusic	4.5/5 stars
The Penguin Guide to Jazz	3.5/4 stars
The Virgin Encyclopedia of Jazz	3/5 stars

Songs for Hip Lovers is a 1957 vocal album by the jazz bandleader Woody Herman, arranged by Marty Paich.

== Recording and music ==
The album was recorded in two sessions, in January and March 1957. The material is standards and the arrangements are by Marty Paich.

== Release and reception ==
Songs for Hip Lovers was reissued by Verve Records on CD. Ken Dryden reviewed the album for AllMusic and wrote that "Herman is a swinging, friendly singer heard doing such time-tested standards as the humorous "Makin' Whoopee," a more upbeat than typical "Willow Weep For Me," and "I Won't Dance." The musicians from each of the two sessions provide strong accompaniment: "Sweets" Edison, Charlie Shavers, and Ben Webster are outstanding and Marty Paich's arrangements fit Herman's style rather well". The Penguin Guide to Jazz described it as "a delightful set. Herman's singing was enduring and unpretentious, and he made a lyric line swing without manhandling it." Scott Yanow, in his book Bebop, writes that the album has its "charming moments" but the "horns are missing in its concise performances".

== Track listing ==
1. "Makin' Whoopee" (Walter Donaldson, Gus Kahn) – 3:26
2. "I Won't Dance" (Dorothy Fields, Otto Harbach, Oscar Hammerstein II, Jerome Kern, Jimmy McHugh) – 2:39
3. "I Guess I'll Have to Change My Plan" (Howard Dietz, Arthur Schwartz) – 2:51
4. "Willow Weep for Me" (Ann Ronell) – 3:37
5. "Moon Song" (Sam Coslow, Arthur Johnston) – 2:32
6. "Can't We Be Friends?" (Paul James, Kay Swift) – 3:24
7. "Comes Love" (Lew Brown, Sam H. Stept, Charles Tobias) – 3:27
8. "Ev'rything I've Got" (Lorenz Hart, Richard Rodgers) – 3:02
9. "Alone Together" (Dietz, Schwartz) – 3:07
10. "Bidin' My Time" (George Gershwin, Ira Gershwin) – 3:27
11. "Isn't This a Lovely Day?" (Irving Berlin) – 3:21
12. "Louise" (Leo Robin, Richard A. Whiting) – 3:22

== Personnel ==
- Woody Herman – clarinet, vocals
- Ben Webster – tenor saxophone
- Bill Harris – trombone
- Charlie Shavers, Harry Edison – trumpet
- Barney Kessel, Billy Bauer – guitar
- Jimmy Rowles, Lou Stein – piano
- Joe Mondragon, Milt Hinton – double bass
- Jo Jones, Larry Bunker – drums
- Marty Paich – arranger
