= A Different Drummer (album) =

Studio album by Buddy Rich Big Band
- Released: 1971
- Recorded: July–August, 1971
- Studio: RCA, New York City
- Genre: Jazz
- Label: RCA Victor
- Producer: Pete Spargo

Buddy Rich chronology
Are You Ready for This? (1971)	A Different Drummer (1971)	Conversations (1972)

Professional ratings
Review scores
Source	Rating
Allmusic	link

A Different Drummer, also released as Superstar, is a 1971 big band recording by jazz drummer Buddy Rich for the RCA Records label.

== Reception ==
The Allmusic review by Scott Yanow awarded the album 2.5 stars stating

The material varies widely on this LP from the Buddy Rich big band. Certainly the two numbers from "Jesus Christ Superstar," Van Morrison's "Domino" and the four-song "A Piece of the Road Suite" make one think that Rich and his musicians are trying too hard to get with it. Fortunately, there are also versions of "Straight, No Chaser" and "Chelsea Bridge" included, plus good solos from tenor saxophonist Pat LaBarbera (who is well featured) and altoist Jimmy Mosher, along with high-note work from trumpeter Lin Biviano. The album is very much a mixed bag, not too essential but containing some enjoyable moments.

== Track listing ==
Source: Discogs

Side A
No.	Title	Length
1.	"Superstar"	4:20
2.	"Domino"	4:32
3.	"Chelsea Bridge" (Billy Strayhorn)	5:02
4.	"Paul's Tune"	6:17

Side B
No.	Title	Length
1.	"Straight, No Chaser"	4:10
2.	"Heaven On Their Minds"	4:33
3.	"Pipe Dreams"	4:11
4.	"Countin' Them Long White Lines"	4:46
5.	"Piece of the Road"	0:37
6.	"Back of the Bus"	3:42

- Tracks B3 – B6 make up the "A Piece of the Road" Suite

== Personnel ==
- Buddy Rich – drums
- Bobby Peterson – piano
- David Spinozza – guitar
- Bob Daugherty – bass
- Paul Kondziela – bass
- Candido Camero – bongos, conga
- Phil Kraus – percussion
- Brian Grivna – alto saxophone, flute, soprano saxophone
- Jimmy Mosher – alto saxophone, flute, soprano saxophone
- Pat LaBarbera – tenor saxophone, flute, soprano saxophone
- Don Englert – tenor saxophone, flute, soprano saxophone
- Joe Calo – baritone saxophone, flute, soprano saxophone
- Lin Biviano – trumpet
- John DeFlon – trumpet
- Wayne Naus – trumpet
- Jeff Stout – trumpet
- Bruce Paulson – trombone
- Tony DiMaggio – trombone
- John Leys – bass trombone
