= T-Bird (disambiguation) =

T-Bird is a colloquial name for Ford Thunderbird automobiles.

T-Bird or T-Birds may also refer to:

- Lockheed T-33 Shooting Star, a subsonic American jet trainer
- Golden Circle Air T-Bird, a family of ultralight aircraft produced by Teratorn Aircraft
- Parker RP9 T-Bird, an American, high-wing, T-tailed, single-seat, FAI Open Class glider
- Thunderbird (T-Bird), the second generation of the AMD microprocessor Athlon
- "T-Birds", a song on the album Autoamerican by Blondie
- T-Bird, a character in the 1994 film The Crow
- "The T-Bird", a common name for the Lillooet Indian Reserve No. 1 of the T'it'q'et First Nation
- T-Bird or Thunderbird, team mascot of Ross Sheppard High School in Edmonton, Alberta, Canada
- T-Bird or Thunderbird, earlier team mascot of Shorewood High School in Shoreline, Washington, United States
- T-Birds, a greaser gang in the 1978 film Grease and its sequel
- The T-Birds, 1950's band including Sid Haig

== See also ==
- T-Bird at Ako, a 1982 Filipino film
- T-Bird Gang, a 1959 American film
- T-Bird Rhythm, a 1982 studio album by The Fabulous Thunderbirds
- Golden T-Bird Awards, original name of the Asbury Park Music Awards
- Thunderbird (disambiguation)
