= Let's Call It Swing =

Studio album by Louis Bellson and His Orchestra
- Released: 1958
- Recorded: May 30, 1956 and January 23 & 25, 1957; New York City and Los Angeles, California
- Genre: Jazz
- Label: Verve; MGV 8258
- Producer: Norman Granz

Louis Bellson chronology
Drumorama! (1956)	Let's Call It Swing (1958)	Music, Romance and Especially Love (1957)

Let's Call It Swing is an album by American jazz drummer Louis Bellson featuring performances recorded in 1956 and 1957 for the Verve label.

== Reception ==
Allmusic awarded the album 3 stars.

Professional ratings
Review scores
Source	Rating
Allmusic	3/5 stars

== Track listing ==
1. "Seedless Grape Fruit"
2. "Flying Hickory"
3. "That's Bell's Son"
4. "Park Avenue Patter"
5. "Smiling King"
6. "Strip Out Sam"
7. "Drum Solo"
8. "Jack's Up"
9. "Go Ahead"
10. "Swing This"
11. "Let's Call It Swing"
- Recorded in New York City on May 30, 1956 (tracks 1–6) and in Los Angeles, CA on January 23, 1957 (track 7) and January 25, 1957 (tracks 8–11)

== Personnel ==
- Louis Bellson – drums
- Doc Severinsen (tracks 8–11), Charlie Shavers (tracks 1–6) – trumpet
- Vincent Forchetti (tracks 1–6), Sonny Russo (tracks 8–11) – trombone
- Red Press – alto saxophone (tracks 1–6 & 8–11)
- Eddie Wasserman – tenor saxophone (tracks 1–6 & 8–11)
- Ted Lee (tracks 1–6), Ernie Wilkins (tracks 8–11) – baritone saxophone
- Irving Josephs (tracks 8–11), Lou Stein (tracks 1–6) – piano
- George Duvivier – bass
- Louis Bellson, Don Redman, Ernie Wilkins – arranger
