= Drumorama! =

Studio album by Louis Bellson
- Released: 1957
- Recorded: January 23 & 24, 1957; Los Angeles, CA
- Genre: Jazz
- Label: Verve; MGV 8193
- Producer: Norman Granz

Louis Bellson chronology
The Driving Louis Bellson (1955)	Drumorama! (1957)	Let's Call It Swing (1957)

Drumorama! is an album by American jazz drummer Louis Bellson featuring performances recorded in 1957 for the Verve label.

== Reception ==
Professional ratings
Review scores
Source	Rating
AllMusic	3/5 stars

AllMusic awarded the album 3 stars.

== Track listing ==
All compositions by Louis Bellson, except as indicated.

1. "A Trip to the Jungle"
2. "Scene U.S.A."
3. "Drum Solo"
4. "Zip" (Richard Rodgers, Lorenz Hart)
5. "Blues in 6/4"
6. "Heat Wave" (Irving Berlin)
7. "Far Eastern Week-End"
8. "Continental Fandangle"

== Personnel ==
- Louis Bellson – drums
- Harry Edison - trumpet
- Juan Tizol - valve trombone
- Willie Smith - alto saxophone
- Don Abney - piano
- Truck Parham - bass
- Norman Granz - tambourine
