= Music, Romance and Especially Love =

Studio album by Louis Bellson and His Orchestra
- Released: 1958
- Recorded: July 24 & 25, 1957; Los Angeles, CA
- Genre: Jazz
- Label: Verve; MGV 8280
- Producer: Norman Granz

Louis Bellson chronology
Let's Call It Swing (1957)	Music, Romance and Especially Love (1958)	Louis Bellson at The Flamingo (1957)

Music, Romance and Especially Love is an album by American jazz drummer Louis Bellson featuring performances recorded in 1957 for the Verve label.

== Reception ==
Allmusic awarded the album 3 stars.

Professional ratings
Review scores
Source	Rating
Allmusic	3/5 stars

== Track listing ==
1. "Feather's Nest" (Ernie Wilkins)
2. "Ting-a-Ling" (Louie Bellson, Charlie Shavers)
3. "The Best Days"
4. "Hamer's Hang Up" (Wilkins)
5. "Music Romance and Especially Love" (Bellson, Sam H. Stept)
6. "Delightfully Yours"
7. "Escapade" (Juan Tizol)
8. "Undecided"
9. "Mambo Portofino" (Bellson)
10. "Caravan" (Tizol)
11. "Over We Go" (Bellson)
12. "Cire's Thought"
- Recorded in Los Angeles, CA on July 24, 1957 (tracks 1–6) and July 25, 1957 (tracks 7–12)

== Personnel ==
- Louis Bellson – drums
- Harry Edison - trumpet
- Juan Tizol - valve trombone
- Willie Smith - alto saxophone
- Buddy Collette - tenor saxophone, flute
- Bob Poland - baritone saxophone
- Jimmy Rowles - piano
- Red Mitchell – bass
