= The Driving Louis Bellson =

Studio album by Louis Bellson and His Orchestra
- Released: 1955
- Recorded: February 2, 1955; New York City
- Genre: Jazz
- Label: Norgran; MGN 1020
- Producer: Norman Granz

Louis Bellson chronology
Journey Into Love (1954)	The Driving Louis Bellson (1955)	Drumorama! (1957)

The Hawk Talks cover

The Driving Louis Bellson (also released as The Hawk Talks) is an album by American jazz drummer Louis Bellson featuring performances recorded in 1955 for the Norgran label.

== Reception ==
AllMusic awarded the album 3 stars.

Professional ratings
Review scores
Source	Rating
AllMusic	3/5 stars

== Track listing ==
All compositions by Louis Bellson, except as indicated.

1. "Basie" - 6:18
2. "Charlie O" - 4:47
3. "All Right" (Benny Goodman) - 5:14
4. "The Hawk Talks" - 3:52
5. "Festivale" - 4:08
6. "Greetings" - 5:10
7. "Mambo a la Louis Bellson" (Ralph Martin, Mike Alexander) - 3:59

== Personnel ==
- Louis Bellson – drums
- Charlie Shavers – trumpet (tracks 1–3 & 6)
- Nate Brown – flute (tracks 4, 5 & 7)
- Sid Brown – bass clarinet (tracks 4, 5 & 7)
- Seldon Powell – tenor saxophone (tracks 1–3 & 6)
- Lou Stein – piano
- Wendell Marshall – bass
- Sabu Martinez – congas, bongos (tracks 4, 5 & 7)
- Alexander Delannay, Cyril Jackson, Joe Comadore – congas (tracks 4, 5 & 7)
- Mike Alexander, Rod Clavery, Alfonso Marshall – congas, steel drums (tracks 4, 5 & 7)
