= Charlie Shavers =

American jazz trumpeter (1920–1971)

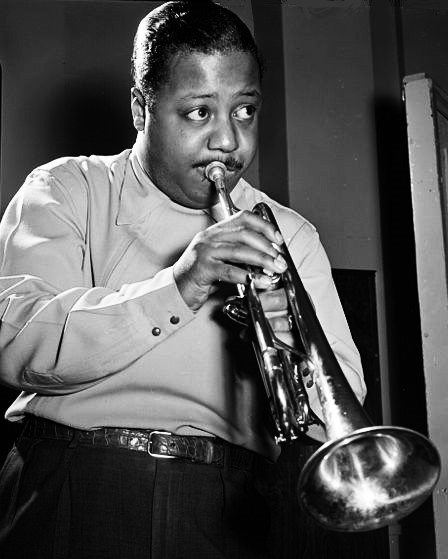
- Charlie Shavers, May 1947; Photography by William P. Gottlieb

Background information
- Born: Charles James Shavers; August 3, 1920; New York City, New York, U.S.
- Died: July 8, 1971 (aged 50) New York City
- Genres: Jazz
- Occupations: Musician; composer; arranger
- Instrument: Trumpet

Charles James Shavers (August 3, 1920 – July 8, 1971) was an American jazz trumpeter who played with Dizzy Gillespie, Nat King Cole, Roy Eldridge, Johnny Dodds, Jimmie Noone, Sidney Bechet, Midge Williams, Tommy Dorsey, and Billie Holiday. He was also an arranger and composer, and one of his compositions, "Undecided", is a jazz standard.

== Career ==
Shavers's father, a distant relative of Fats Navarro, was from the Shavers family of Key West, Florida. Charlie Shavers was a cousin of heavyweight boxer Earnie Shavers. Born in New York City, he took up piano and banjo before switching to trumpet. In the mid-1930s, he performed with Tiny Bradshaw and Lucky Millinder. In 1935, he played in the trumpet section with Dizzy Gillespie and Carl (Bama) Warwick in Frankie Fairfax's Campus Club Orchestra. In 1936, he joined John Kirby's Sextet as trumpet soloist and arranger. He was only 16, but gave his birth date as 1917 to avoid child labor laws; many biographies still list this date.

Shavers's arrangements and solos helped make the band one of the most commercially successful and imitated of its day. In 1937, he performed with Midge Williams and her Jazz Jesters. In 1944, he began playing sessions in Raymond Scott's CBS staff orchestra. In 1945, he left John Kirby's band to join Tommy Dorsey's Orchestra, with whom he toured and recorded, off and on, until Dorsey's death in 1956. In 1949, he sang and played the hit "The Hucklebuck" with the Dorsey Orchestra. He can be seen as a member of Dorsey's Orchestra on numerous "Stage Show" telecasts for CBS, including early Elvis Presley appearances. During this time he also continued to play at CBS; he also appeared with the Metronome All-Stars, and made a number of recordings as trumpet soloist with Billie Holiday. From 1953 to 1954, he worked with Benny Goodman and toured Europe with Norman Granz's popular Jazz at the Philharmonic series. He formed his own band with Terry Gibbs and Louie Bellson.

Shavers died from throat cancer in New York in 1971 at the age of 50. His friend Louis Armstrong died while Shavers was on his deathbed, and his last request was that his trumpet mouthpiece be buried with Armstrong.

== Discography ==
=== As leader ===
- Horn o' Plenty (Bethlehem, 1954)
- Gershwin, Shavers and Strings (Bethlehem, 1954)
- The Most Intimate (Bethlehem, 1955)
- The Complete Charlie Shavers with Maxine Sullivan (Bethlehem, 1957)
- Trumpets All Out with Art Farmer, Ernie Royal, Emmet Baker, Harold Baker (Savoy, 1957)
- Hawk Eyes with Coleman Hawkins, Tiny Grimes (Prestige, 1959)
- Blue Stompin' with Hal Singer (Prestige, 1959)
- Charlie Digs Paree (MGM, 1959)
- Girl Of My Dreams (Everest, 1960) later reissued on Everest as Out Of Nowhere
- Like Charlie (Everest, 1960)
- Here Comes Charlie (Everest, 1961)
- The Music from Milk and Honey with Wild Bill Davis (Everest, 1961)
- Excitement Unlimited (Capitol, 1963)
- At Le Crazy Horse Saloon in Paris (Everest, 1964)
- Kicks! with Nat King Cole, Buddy Rich, (Fontana, 1966)
- Paris Jazz (Sunset, 1967) compilation from his Girl Of My Dreams and At Le Crazy Horse Saloon in Paris records
- The Last Session (Black & Blue, 1970)
- Trumpet Man (Phoenix Jazz, 1978)
- Live at the London House (Hep, 1980)
- Jazz at the Philharmonic: The Trumpet Battle 1952 (Verve, 1983)
- A Man and His Music (Storyville, 1985)
- Live from Chicago (Spotlite, 1985)

=== As sideman ===
With Fred Astaire

- The Astaire Story No. 1 (Mercury, 1954)
- The Astaire Story No. 2 (Mercury, 1954)
- The Astaire Story No. 3 (Mercury, 1954)
- The Astaire Story No. 4 (Mercury, 1954)

With Count Basie

- The Count! (Clef, 1955)
- Count Basie and His Band That Swings the Blues (American Recording Society, 1956)
- Basie Rides Again (Verve, 1957)
- A Portrait of an Orchestra (Verve, 1965)

With Louis Bellson

- Louis Bellson Quintet (Norgran, 1954)
- The Driving Louis Bellson (Norgran, 1955)
- The Hawk Talks (Norgran, 1956)
- Let's Call It Swing (Verve, 1958)
- Drummer's Holiday (Verve, 1959)

With Tommy Dorsey

- Tommy Dorsey (RCA, 1957)
- Tribute to Dorsey Vol. 2 (RCA Victor 1957)
- Tommy Dorsey's Greatest Band (20th Century Fox, 1959)
- This Is Tommy Dorsey and His Greatest Band Volume 1 (20th Century Fox, 1964)

With Lionel Hampton

- Stardust (Decca, 1954)
- Lionel Hampton with the Just Jazz All Stars (GNP, 1955)
- Gene Norman Presents Just Jazz (Decca, 1958)

With Coleman Hawkins

- The Hawk in Flight (RCA Victor, 1955)
- The Hawk in Hi Fi (RCA Victor, 1956)
- Hawk Eyes (Prestige, 1959)
- Rainbow Mist (Delmark, 1992)

With Billie Holiday

- An Evening with Billie Holiday (Clef, 1953)
- Lady Sings the Blues (Verve, 1956)
- Solitude (Clef, 1956)
- The Unforgettable Lady Day (Verve, 1959)
- The Mellow Side of Billie Holiday (Verve, 1967)

With Charlie Ventura

- An Evening with Mary Ann McCall and Charlie Ventura (Norgran, 1955)
- Jumping with Ventura (EmArcy, 1955)
- Charlie Ventura's Carnegie Hall Concert (Columbia, 1956)
- East of Suez (Regent, 1958)

With others

- Red Allen, Cozy Cole, Jazz at the Metropole Cafe (Bethlehem, 1955)
- Steve Allen, Jazz for Tonight (Coral, 1955)
- Louis Armstrong, I Love Jazz! (Decca, 1962)
- Louis Armstrong, Town Hall (RCA Victor, 1957)
- Mildred Bailey, Her Greatest Performances 1929–1946 (Columbia, 1962)
- Charlie Barnet, Cherokee (Everest, 1958)
- Sidney Bechet, Bechet of New Orleans (RCA Victor 1965)
- Don Byas, Jazz...Free and Easy (Regent, 1957)
- Cándido Camero, The Volcanic (ABC-Paramount, 1957)
- Cándido Camero, Latin Fire (ABC-Paramount, 1959)
- Tadd Dameron, The Magic Touch (Riverside, 1962)
- Ella Fitzgerald, The First Lady of Song (Decca, 1958)
- Bud Freeman, Midnight at Eddie Condon's (EmArcy, 1955)
- Stan Getz, Groovin' High (Modern, 1956)
- Jackie Gleason, Jackie Gleason Presents Riff Jazz (Capitol, 1958)
- Benny Goodman, The Hits of Benny Goodman (Capitol, 1963)
- Woody Herman, Songs for Hip Lovers (Verve, 1957)
- Claude Hopkins, Music of the Early Jazz Dances (20th Fox, 1958)
- Budd Johnson, Blues a la Mode (Felsted, 1958)
- Budd Johnson, "Ya! Ya!" (Black and Blue, 1970)
- Gene Krupa, The Exciting Gene Krupa (Clef, 1953)
- Gene Krupa and Buddy Rich, The Drum Battle (Verve, 1960)
- Metronome All-Stars, Metronome All-Stars (Harmony, 1957)
- Rose Murphy, Jazz, Joy and Happiness (United Artists, 1962)
- Frankie Ortega & Sy Oliver, 77 Sunset Strip and Other Selections (Jubilee, 1959)
- Charlie Parker, The Charlie Parker Story Vol. 3 (Verve, 1957)
- Oscar Peterson, At JATP (Verve, 1960)
- Flip Phillips, Swinging with Flip (Clef, 1956)
- Bill Potts, The Jazz Soul of Porgy & Bess (United Artists, 1959)
- Don Redman, The Don Redman All-Stars Vol.2 (Sesac, 1960)
- Della Reese, Melancholy Baby (Jubilee, 1957)
- Buddy Rich, Buddy Rich at JATP (VSP, 1966)
- Edgar Sampson, Swing Softly Sweet Sampson (Coral, 1957)
- Phil Silvers, Phil Silvers and Swinging Brass (Columbia, 1957)
- Jimmy Smith, Any Number Can Win (Verve, 1963)
- Maxine Sullivan, Leonard Feather Presents Maxine Sullivan–1956 (Period, 1956)
- Maxine Sullivan, Leonard Feather Presents Maxine Sullivan Vol. II (Period, 1956)
- Sarah Vaughan, Sassy Swings Again (Mercury, 1967)
- Dinah Washington, The Swingin' Miss "D" (EmArcy, 1957)
- Dinah Washington, Dinah Washington Sings Fats Waller (Mercury, 1959)
- Ernie Wilkins, The Big New Band of the 60's (Everest, 1960)
- Teddy Wilson, Teddy Wilson & His All Star Jazz Sextette (Allegro, 1956)
- Teddy Wilson, The Delicate Swing of Teddy Wilson (Polydor, 1968)
