= Conversations (Buddy Rich, Louie Bellson and Kenny Clare album) =

1972 jazz album

Studio album by Buddy Rich, Louie Bellson and Kenny Clare with Bobby Lamb & Ray Premru Orchestra
- Released: 1972
- Recorded: December 5, 1971
- Venue: Queen Elizabeth Hall, London
- Genre: Jazz
- Label: EMI/Parlophone
- Producer: Walter J Ridley

Buddy Rich chronology
A Different Drummer (1971)	Conversations (1972)	Rich in London (1972)

Louie Bellson chronology
Are You Ready for This? (1971)	Conversations (1972)	150 MPH (1974)

Conversations is a 1972 album showcasing three jazz drummers Buddy Rich, Louie Bellson, and Kenny Clare with the Bobby Lamb - Ray Premru Orchestra.

== Track listing ==
LP side 1:

1. "Round And Round And Round Again" (Ray Premru)
2. "Just Louie" (Bellson) – Louie Bellson drum solo
3. "Son Of Cuchulainn" (Bobby Lamb)

LP side 2:

1. "Conversations With B.L.K." (Bobby Lamb)

== Personnel ==
- Buddy Rich – drums on "Son of Cuchulainn" and "Conversations with B.L.K"
- Louie Bellson – drums on "Just Louie" and "Conversations with B.L.K"
- Kenny Clare – drums on "Round and Round and Round Again" and "Conversations with B.L.K"
- The Bobby Lamb – Ray Premru Orchestra
  - Greg Bowen, Derek Watkins, Stan Reynolds, Ronnie Hughes, John McLeavy – trumpets
  - Cliff Hardie, Keith Christie, John Marshall, Jack Thirlwall, Bobby Lamb, Ray Premru – trombones
  - Nick Busch, Colin Horton, John Pigneguy, Tony Lucas, Nick Hill – French horns
  - John Jenkins – tuba
  - Duncan Lamont, Jim Philip – tenor saxophones
  - Ronnie Chamberlain, Alan Branscombe – alto saxophones
  - Ken Dryden – baritone saxophone
  - Steve Gray – piano
  - Arthur Watts – bass
  - Tristan Fry – percussion
