= Thunderbird (Louis Bellson album) =

Studio album by Louis Bellson
- Released: 1966
- Recorded: 1965
- Genre: Jazz
- Length: 38:13
- Label: Impulse!
- Producer: Bob Thiele

Louis Bellson chronology
Are You Ready for This? (1965)	Thunderbird (1966)	The Dynamic Sound of Louie Bellson (1968)

Thunderbird is an album by American jazz drummer Louis Bellson featuring performances recorded in 1965 for the Impulse! label.

== Reception ==
The Allmusic review awarded the album 3 stars.

Professional ratings
Review scores
Source	Rating
Allmusic	3/5 stars

== Track listing ==
1. "Thunderbird" (Bellson, F. Thompson) - 4:27
2. "The Little Pixie" (Thad Jones) - 5:18
3. "Nails" (Jimmy Heath) - 4:18
4. "Serenade in Blues" (Jay Hill) - 5:08
5. "Back on the Scene" (Kenny Sampson) - 3:44
6. "No More Blues" (Antonio Carlos Jobim, Vinícius de Moraes) - 4:28
7. "Cotton Tail" (Duke Ellington) - 7:07
8. "Softly With Feeling" (Neil Hefti) - 3:43

== Personnel ==
- Louis Bellson – drums
- Harry Edison - trumpet
- Carl Fontana - trombone
- Sam Most – alto saxophone
- Ed Scarazzo – tenor saxophone
- Jim Mulidore - baritone saxophone
- Arnold Teich - piano
- Jim Cook – bass
