= Thunderbird Lodge =

Thunderbird Lodge may refer to:

- Thunderbird Lodge (Lake Tahoe, Nevada), listed on the NRHP in Nevada
- Thunderbird Lodge (Rose Valley, Pennsylvania), listed on the NRHP in Pennsylvania
- Thunderbird Lodge (Chinle, Arizona), in Arizona
