= Thunderbird Lodge (Chinle, Arizona) =

Historic motel in Apache County, Arizona

Coordinates: 36.1469°N 109.5387°W

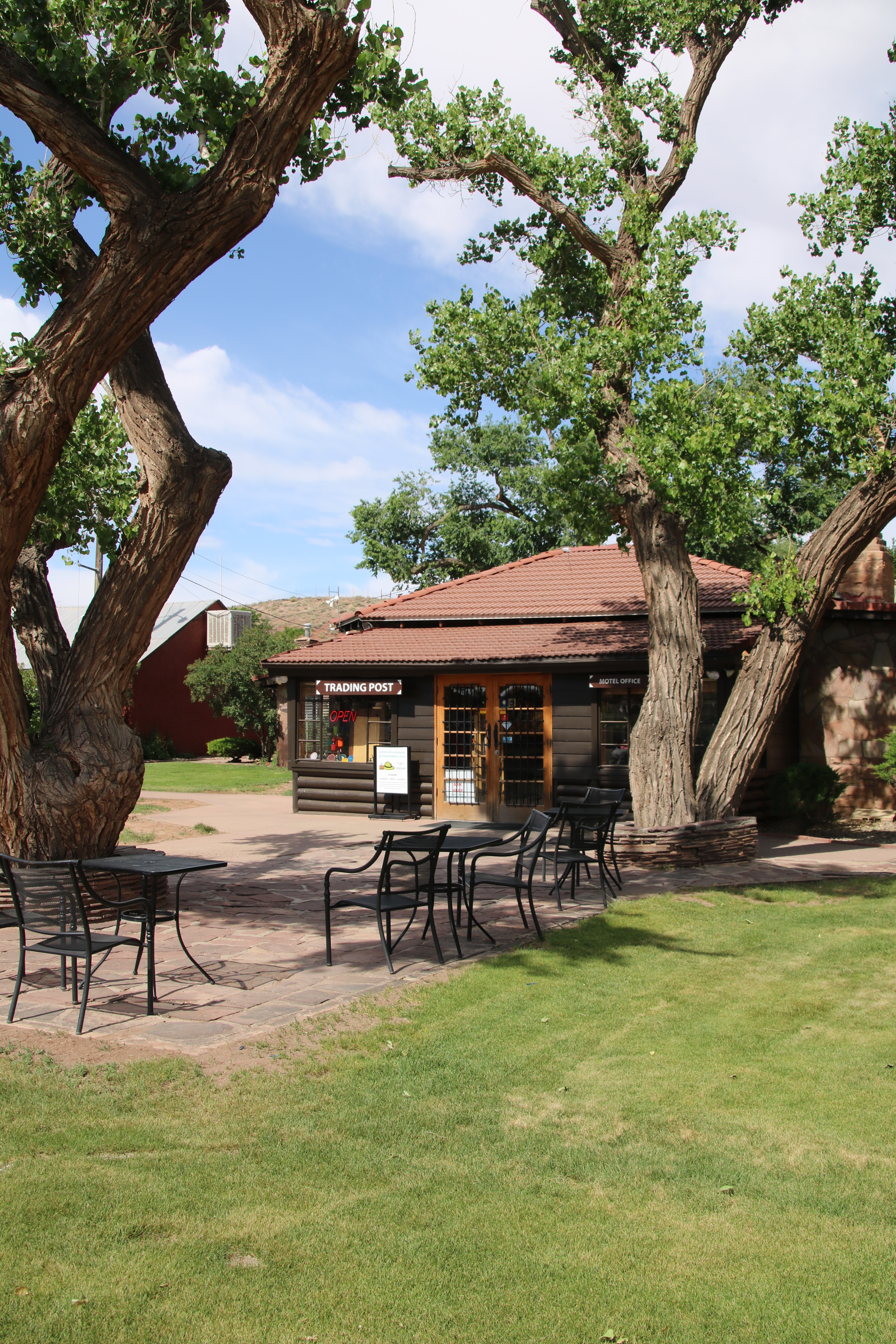
The Thunderbird Lodge.

The Thunderbird Lodge is a historic motel in Chinle, Arizona. The only lodging facility within Canyon de Chelly National Monument, a national monument established in 1931, it has grown out of an old trading post built in 1896, the Thunderbird Lodge Trading Post. Some elements use Pueblo Revival architecture.

== Bibliography ==
- Laura Soullière Harrison and Beverley B. Spears, « Historic Structure Report: Thunderbird Lodge », Southwest Cultural Resources Center Professional Papers, n°17, 1989.
- Peter J. McKenna and Scott E. Travis, « Archeological Investigations at Thunderbird Lodge », Southwest Cultural Resources Center Professional Papers, n°20, 1989.
