= Crystal Bay Township, Lake County, Minnesota =

Crystal Bay Township, Minnesota
- Township
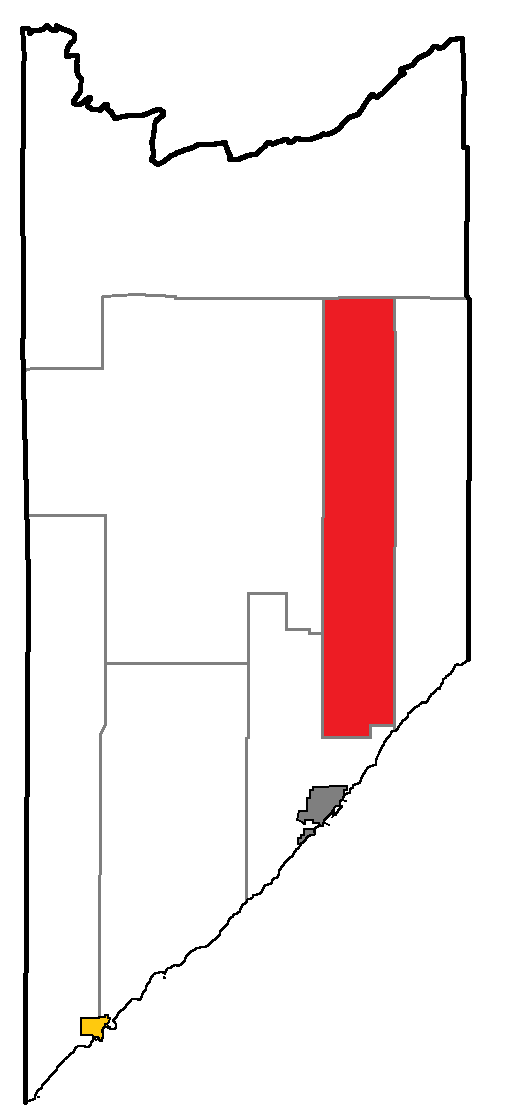
- Location of Crystal Bay Township in Lake County, Minnesota
- Coordinates: 47°34′35″N 91°13′6″W
- Country: United States
- State: Minnesota
- County: Lake

Area
  - Total: 210.2 sq mi (544.5 km^{2})
  - Land: 203.7 sq mi (527.5 km^{2})
  - Water: 6.6 sq mi (17.0 km^{2})
- Elevation: 1,800 ft (550 m)

Population (2020)
  - Total: 435
  - Density: 2.14/sq mi (0.825/km^{2})
- Time zone: UTC-6 (Central (CST))
  - Summer (DST): UTC-5 (CDT)
- FIPS code: 27-14194
- GNIS feature ID: 0663903
- Website: https://crystalbaytownship.org

Crystal Bay Township is a township in Lake County, Minnesota, United States. The population was 435 at the 2020 census. It contains part of the census-designated place of Finland.

Crystal Bay Township was organized in 1904, and named after Crystal Bay.

== Geography ==
According to the United States Census Bureau, the township has a total area of 210.2 square miles (544 km^{2}), of which 203.7 square miles (528 km^{2}) is land and 6.6 square miles (17 km^{2}) (3.12%) is water.

== Demographics ==
As of the census of 2000, there were 607 people, 235 households, and 165 families residing in the township. The population density was 3.0 inhabitants per square mile (1.2/km^{2}). There were 350 housing units at an average density of 1.7 per square mile (0.66/km^{2}). The racial makeup of the township was 98.68% White, 0.33% African American, 0.16% Asian, 0.66% from other races, and 0.16% from two or more races. Hispanic or Latino of any race were 1.15% of the population.

There were 235 households, out of which 35.3% had children under the age of 18 living with them, 59.6% were married couples living together, 6.4% had a female householder with no husband present, and 29.4% were non-families. 25.1% of all households were made up of individuals, and 7.2% had someone living alone who was 65 years of age or older. The average household size was 2.58 and the average family size was 3.11.

In the township the population was spread out, with 27.8% under the age of 18, 8.7% from 18 to 24, 31.1% from 25 to 44, 23.1% from 45 to 64, and 9.2% who were 65 years of age or older. The median age was 36 years. For every 100 females, there were 104.4 males. For every 100 females age 18 and over, there were 108.6 males.

The median income for a household in the township was $35,000, and the median income for a family was $42,917. Males had a median income of $42,031 versus $21,429 for females. The per capita income for the township was $14,161. About 7.6% of families and 9.7% of the population were below the poverty line, including 7.6% of those under age 18 and 22.1% of those age 65 or over.
