= Thunderbird Mesa =

Mountain in Arizona, United States

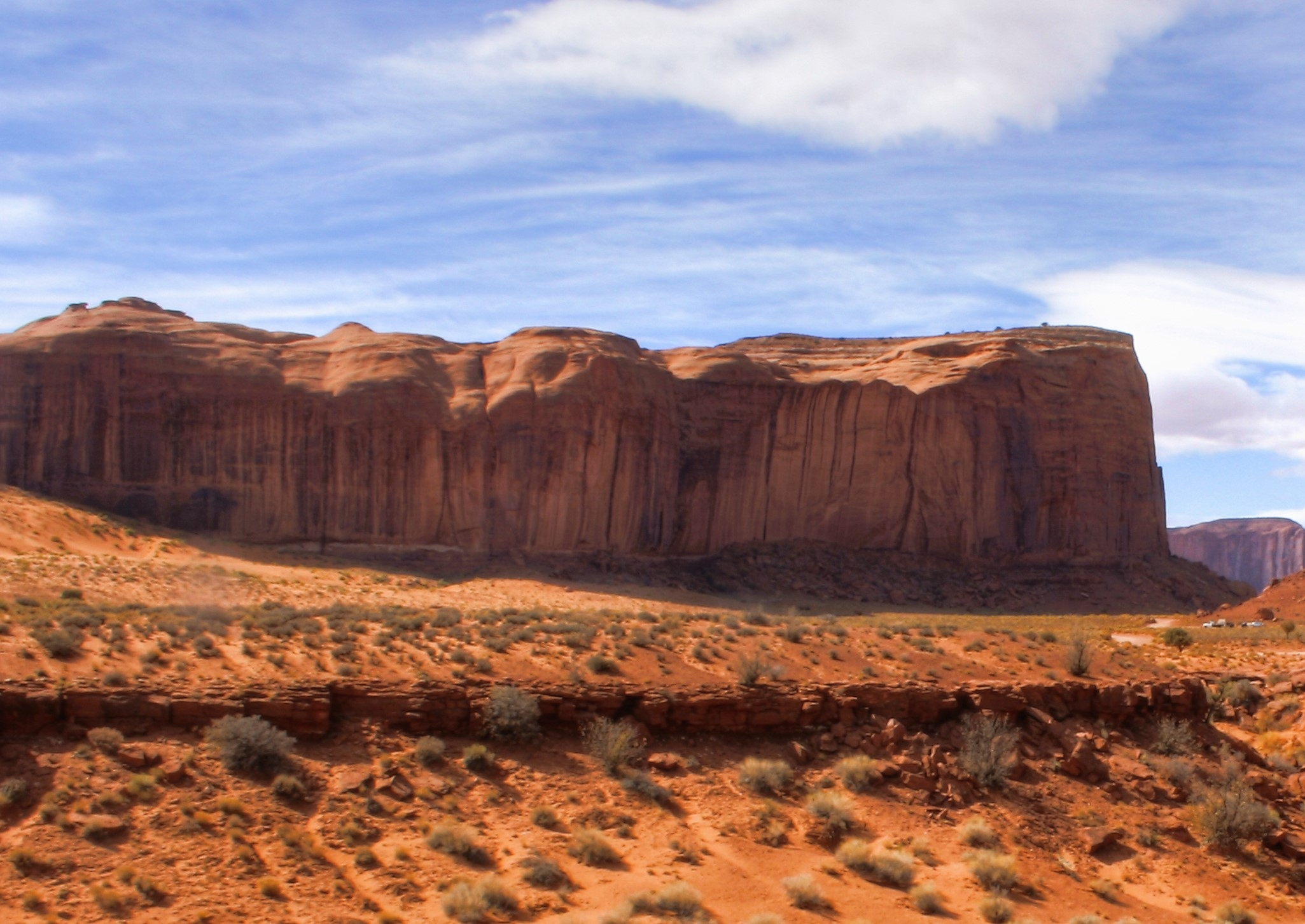
- East-northeast aspect

Highest point
- Elevation: 5,814 ft (1,772 m)
- Prominence: 560 ft (171 m)
- Parent peak: Hunts Mesa
- Isolation: 0.81 mi (1.30 km)
- Coordinates: 36°55′50″N 110°04′39″W

Geography
- Location within Arizona Location within the United States
- Location: Navajo Nation; Navajo County, Arizona, U.S.
- Parent range: Colorado Plateau
- Topo map: USGS Mitten Buttes

Geology
- Mountain type: Mesa
- Rock type: Sandstone

Thunderbird Mesa is a 5,814-foot-elevation (1,772-meter) summit in Navajo County, Arizona, United States.

== Description ==
Thunderbird Mesa is situated four miles (6.4 km) southeast of the Monument Valley visitor center on Navajo Nation land. Precipitation runoff from this mesa's slopes drains to Gypsum Creek which is a tributary of the San Juan River. Topographic relief is significant as the summit rises 600 feet (183 meters) above the surrounding terrain in 0.1 mile (0.16 km). The nearest higher neighbor is Rain God Mesa, 0.8 miles (1.3 km) to the north. The landform's toponym has been officially adopted by the U.S. Board on Geographic Names. The name refers to an outline that is shaped like a thunderbird on the east side of the mesa.

== Geology ==
Thunderbird Mesa is composed of three principal strata. The bottom layer is slope-forming Organ Rock Shale, the next stratum is cliff-forming De Chelly Sandstone, and the upper layer is Moenkopi Formation. The rock ranges in age from Permian at the bottom to Triassic at the top, with a major unconformity between the sandstone and Moenkopi. The buttes and mesas of Monument Valley are the result of the Organ Rock Shale being more easily eroded than the overlaying sandstone.

== Climate ==
Spring and fall are the most favorable seasons to visit Thunderbird Mesa. According to the Köppen climate classification system, it is located in a semi-arid climate zone with cold winters and hot summers. Summers average 54 days above 90 °F (32 °C) annually, and highs rarely exceed 100 °F (38 °C). Summer nights are comfortably cool, and temperatures drop quickly after sunset. Winters are cold, but daytime highs are usually above freezing. Winter temperatures below 0 °F (−18 °C) are uncommon, though possible. This desert climate receives less than 10 inches (250 millimeters) of annual rainfall, and snowfall is generally light during the winter.

== See also ==
- List of appearances of Monument Valley in the media
