= Triumph Thunderbird (disambiguation) =

Triumph Thunderbird may refer to a number of different motorcycles produced by Triumph Engineering and Triumph Motorcycles Ltd:

- Triumph Thunderbird, the original model manufactured from 1949 to 1966
- Triumph TR65 Thunderbird, a 650 cc model manufactured from 1981 to 1983
- Triumph Thunderbird 900, a retro-style 900 cc motorcycle manufactured from 1995 to 2004
- Triumph Thunderbird (2009), a cruiser-style motorcycle with a 1,600 or 1,700 cc engine manufactured since 2009
