= Drummer's Holiday =

Studio album by Louis Bellson and His Orchestra
- Released: 1958
- Recorded: February 12 & May 30, 1956, and January 26, 1958; New York City
- Genre: Jazz
- Label: Verve; MGV 8354
- Producer: Norman Granz

Louie Bellson chronology
Louie Bellson at The Flamingo (1957)	Drummer's Holiday (1958)	The Brilliant Bellson Sound (1959)

Drummer's Holiday is an album by American jazz drummer Louie Bellson featuring performances recorded in 1957 for the Verve label.

== Reception ==
Professional ratings
Review scores
Source	Rating
Allmusic	3/5 stars

AllMusic awarded the album 3 stars.

== Track listing ==
1. "Blues for Keeps" - 6:52
2. "For Louis's Kicks" - 3:21
3. "T-Bones" - 3:14
4. "I'm Shooting High" (Jimmy McHugh, Ted Koehler) - 2:45
5. "How Many Times?" - 3:00
6. "Portofino"
7. "Drummer's Holiday"
8. "Limehouse Blues" (Philip Braham, Douglas Furber)
- Recorded in New York City on February 12, 1956 (track 1), May 30, 1956 (tracks 2 & 3) and January 26, 1958 (tracks 4–8)

== Personnel ==
- Louie Bellson – drums
- Charlie Shavers - trumpet
- Eddie Bert (track 1), Vincent Forchetti (tracks 2 & 3) - trombone
- Red Press (tracks 2 & 3), Ernie Wilkins (track 1) - alto saxophone
- Eddie Wasserman - tenor saxophone (tracks 2–8)
- Ted Lee - baritone saxophone (tracks 1–3)
- Hank Jones (tracks 4–8), Nat Pierce (track 1), Lou Stein (tracks 2 & 3) - piano
- Ray Brown (tracks 1 & 4–8), George Duvivier (tracks 2 & 3) - bass
