= Thunderbird Park =

Thunderbird Park may refer to:

- Thunderbird Park (Victoria, British Columbia), a public park in Victoria, British Columbia
- Thunderbird Park (Cedar City), a baseball venue on the campus of Southern Utah University in Cedar City, Utah
