= Are You Ready for This? =

Studio album by Buddy Rich and Louie Bellson
- Released: 1971
- Recorded: January 18, 1965
- Genre: Jazz
- Label: Roost / Roulette

Buddy Rich and Louie Bellson chronology
Keep the Customer Satisfied (1970)	Are You Ready for This? (1971)	A Different Drummer (1971)

Louie Bellson chronology
Louie In London (1970)	Are You Ready for This? (1971)	Conversations (1972)

Professional ratings
Review scores
Source	Rating
Gramophone magazine March, 1972	"Technically...breath-taking..."

Are You Ready for This? is a studio album by jazz drummers Buddy Rich and Louie Bellson, recorded in Japan together with the George Kawaguchi Big Band. Album cover art is by Jack Lonshein.

This recording of "Slides and Hides" includes 22 minutes of soloing by the two drummers and was also included as side 4 of the 1979 European double-LP compilation album, Louis Bellson, With Bells On!

== Track listing ==
LP side A

1. "Slides and Hides Part 1"

LP side B

1. "Slides and Hides Part 2"

arrangement: Benny Carter

== Personnel ==
- Louie Bellson – drums
- Buddy Rich – drums
- Blue Mitchell – trumpet
- Junior Cook – tenor saxophone
- Gene Taylor – acoustic bass
- Toshiko Mariano (Toshiko Akiyoshi) – piano
- The George Kawaguchi Big Band
