= Crystal Bay (Lake Superior) =

Bay in Minnesota, U.S.

Coordinates: 47°20′49″N 91°11′1″W

Crystal Bay is a bay on Lake Superior in Lake County, in the U.S. state of Minnesota.

Crystal Bay was named for the crystalline rocks found on the lake shore.
