= Thunderbird W-14 =

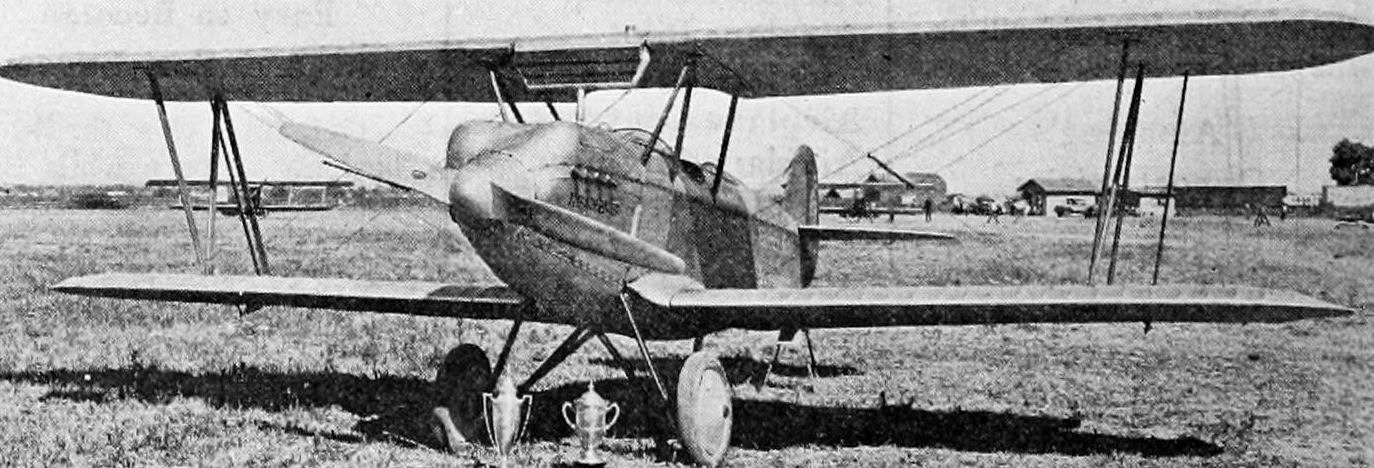
- Thunderbird W-14

General information
- Type: Three seat civil transport
- National origin: United States
- Manufacturer: Thunderbird Aircraft Inc.
- Designer: Theodore A. Woolsey
- Number built: about 40-50

History
- First flight: 11 July 1926

The Thunderbird W-14 was a small, three seat American passenger transport, first flown in 1926, entering production, significantly improved, in 1927 with several different engine options. About 40-50 were built before the financial collapse of the company in 1929.

== Design and development ==
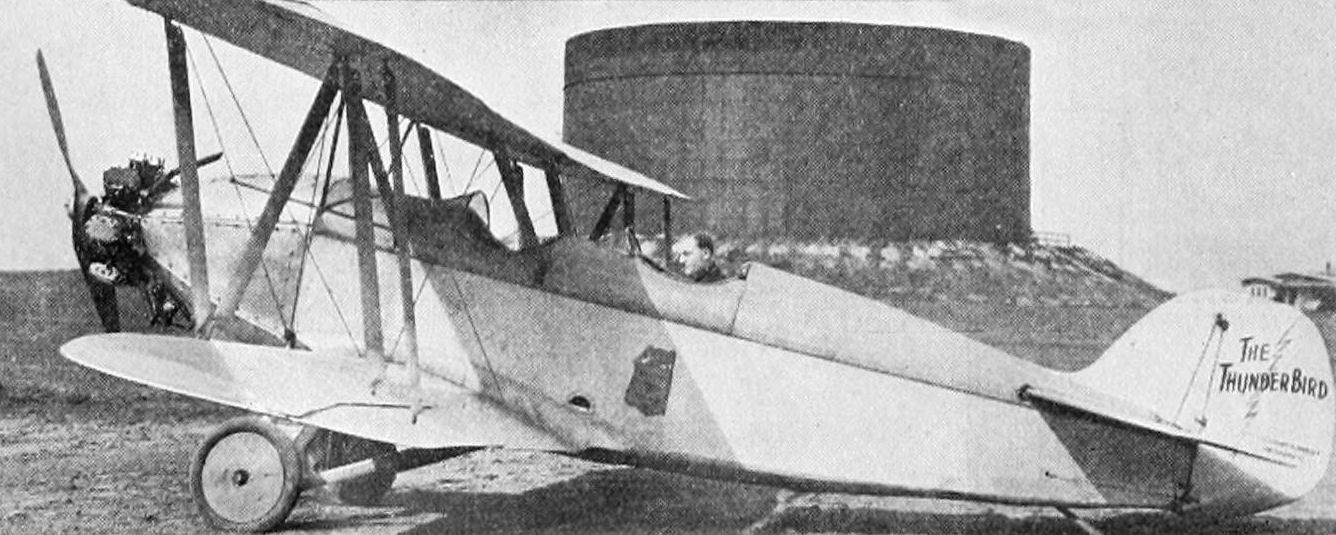
A Bailey C-7-R powered Thunderbird W-14

Design of the Thunderbird W-14 family was begun in 1926 by the W-F-W Aircraft Corporation (formed by Theodore Woolsey, Jack Frye and Paul Whittier). As production started W_F_W was re-organised as the Aero Corporation of California with investment from Walter Hamilton (Frye & Woolsey, Monte Edwards, Walter Hamilton, Paul Richter). With the break-up of the partnership Woolsey arranged new investment to take over the business, which became Thunderbird Aircraft Inc. of 900 N Allen St, Glendale, CA.

The Thunderbird W-14 was an unequal span single bay biplane with wings of rectangular plan out to rounded tips, built around twin wooden spars and fabric-covered. Both upper and lower wings were set with 3° of dihedral and had externally interconnected ailerons. Outward-leaning N-form interplane struts joined the wings, set with 20 in (510 mm) of stagger, and the upper wing was mounted over the fuselage on outward-leaning cabane struts with an inverted V from the forward spar and a single strut from the rear spar on each side.

The prototype's OX-5 water-cooled engine was cleanly cowled, with its 43 US gal (36 imp gal; 160 L) fuel tank immediately behind it and its radiator centrally positioned on the upper wing underside. There were two open cockpits in tandem. The forward one seated either two passengers side-by-side or a trainee pilot, positioned largely under the upper wing. The pilot sat, sightly raised, in the rear cockpit. The stagger and a gentle cut-out enhanced the field of view from both cockpits. Behind the engine the fuselage was a trapezoidal section girder structure of welded steel tubes, tapering rearwards and with a rounded decking behind the cockpits.

The Thunderbird had a conventional tail with a semi-circular plan tailplane mounted on top of the fuselage, wire-braced to the fin. It carried rounded elevators separated by a gap for rudder movement. The fin was also rounded, with a large unbalanced rudder of semi-elliptical profile.

Its original fixed, conventional landing gear was a standard single axle design with pairs of legs and trailing drag struts. There were no brakes and the early tailskid could not be steered.

The Thunderbird made its first flight 11 July 1926. By the autumn of 1927 numerous modifications had been made in preparation for production. These included laminated, rather than solid, wing spars, Warren girder ribs and a steel, rather than wire, cross-braced fuselage. A new, split axle undercarriage was introduced, with axles hinged from the central fuselage underside and equipped with rubber-chord shock absorbers. The tailskid was now steerable.

Production Thunderbirds offered several other engines, all more powerful than the Curtiss. The least powerful was the 95 hp (71 kW) Dayton Bear which originally powered an iceboat. The Bailey CR-7 Bull's Eye was a 120 hp (89 kW) 7-ctlinder radial engine as was the 150 hp (110 kW) Axelson (Floco) B. The elderly, heavy 140 hp (100 kW) Hispano A water-cooled V-8 engine increased speeds by 15 mph (24 km/h; 13 kn) and the climb rate by 12% but needed a 60 US gal (50 imp gal; 230 L) fuel tank to maintain the W-O-14's range. All but the first were certified to power the W-14.

== Operational history ==
Between 40 and 50 production Thunderbirds were built between 1927 and 1929. There were several agencies across the south-western states and it was popular with small flying clubs in the Los Angeles area. Some were used in the Philippines until the Japanese invasion. Others were exported to Canada. In 1929, however, the onset of the depression and a management dispute ended the company even though they had an outstanding order for 50 from a single buyer.

Because the early advertisements for the Thunderbird said only that its maximum speed was over 100 mph, some journals suggested that the 95 mph cruising speed was in fact the maximum. To refute this, a standard Thunderbird with a three-year-old OX-5 engine, previously used by an aero club, was entered for the November 1927 Santa Anna air meet for aircraft with under 100 hp engines, where it won a trophy by completing a triangular course at an average speed of 114 mph (183 km/h; 99 kn). A few days later on 21 November 1927, at the National Guard field in Los Angeles Clint Burrows, the company test pilot, flew four flights each in opposite directions at an average speed of 119.4 mph (192.2 km/h; 103.8 kn). The aircraft was then sold to an air-taxi company for use between Los Angeles and Tucson.

One standard W-14 was bought by Roscoe Turner and modified by the addition of a 50 ft (15 m) diameter parachute held in the wing centre-section to be deployed to save the aircraft and those aboard in an emergency.

Only one Thunderbird remains airworthy, a W-O-14. It was restored by Denny Trone and flew from Brodhead, Wisconsin. After his death in a 2008 flying accident it was donated to the Eagles Mere Air Museum along with other old aircraft he had restored. Ogden lists it as a General Aircraft Company Thunderbird W-14.

== Variants ==
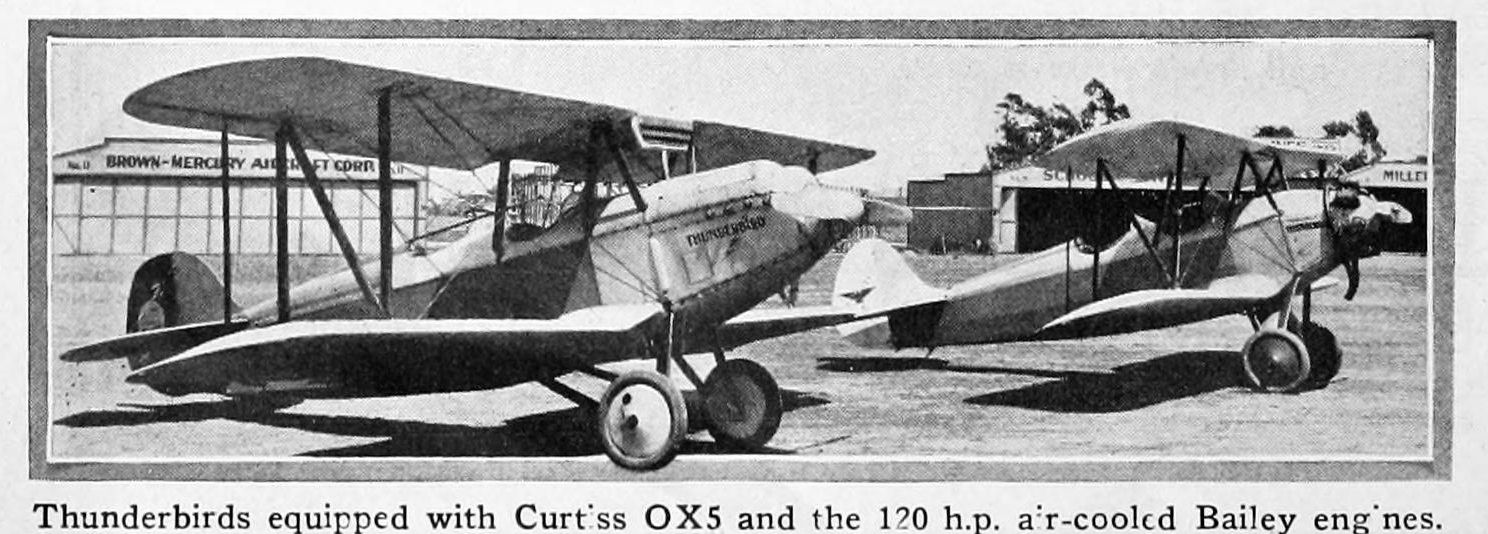
An OX-5 powered Thunderbird alongside a Bailey C-7-R powered aircraft

W-B-14 (W-14-B)
Probable designation of the Thunderbird when powered by a 140 hp (104 kW) Bailey C-7-R "Bull's Eye" 7-cyl radial engine.
W-O-14 (W-14-O)
Powered by a 150 hp (112 kW) Curtiss OX-5 V-8 engine.
W-F-14 (W-14-F)
Powered by a 140 hp (104 kW) Axelson-Floco B 7-cyl radial engine.
W-H-14 (W-14-H)
Powered by a 150 hp (112 kW) Wright-Hisso E V-8 engine.
W-14
One aircraft (7201) powered by a 130 hp (97 kW) Hallett H-526 7-cyl radial engine.

== Specifications (W-14-O) ==
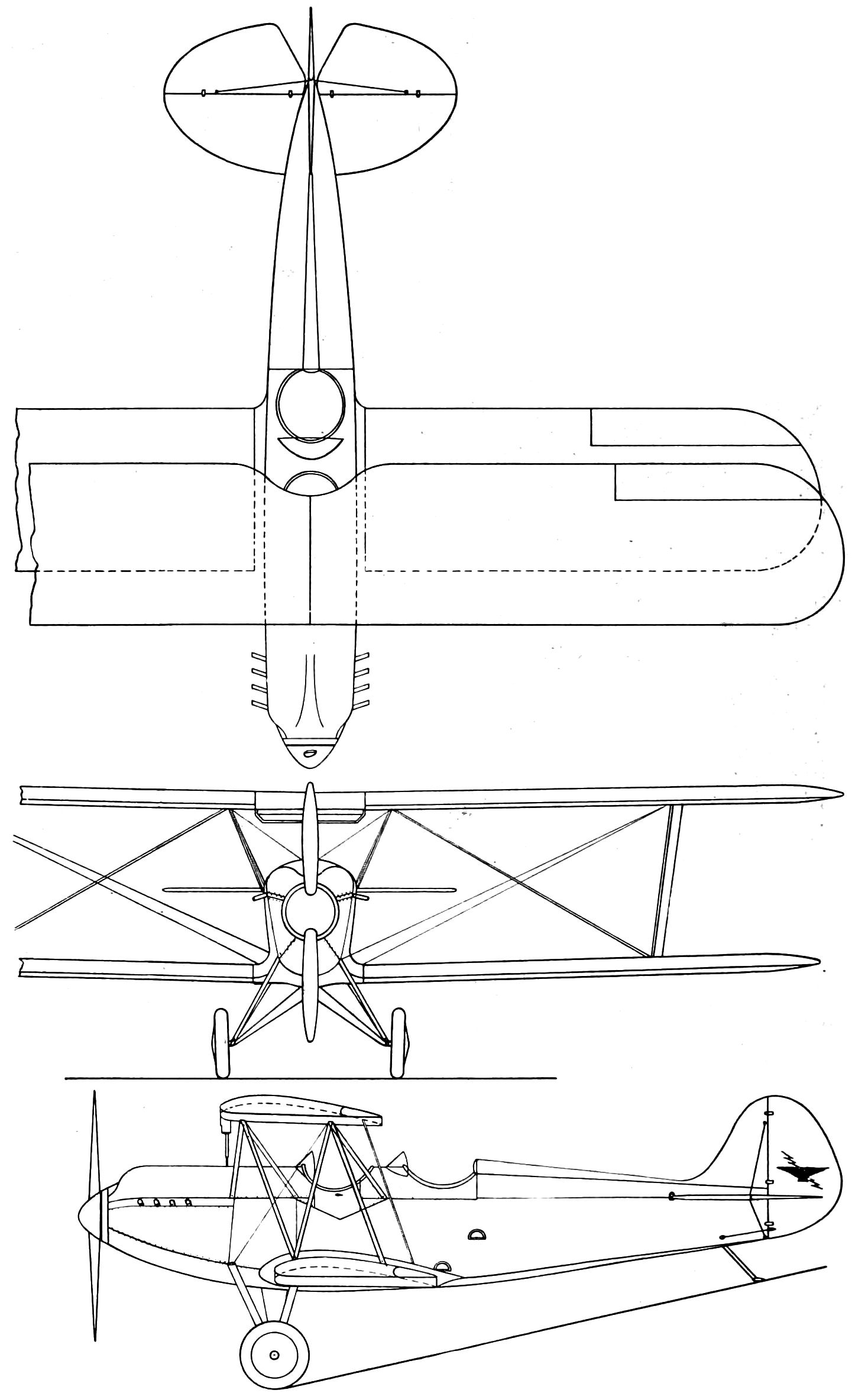
3-view of a Thunderbird W-14-O

Data from Aero Digest:The New Thunderbird Series, "The Thunderbird", Aerofiles

General characteristics

- Crew: One
- Capacity: Two passengers / 850 lb (386 kg) payload
- Length: 24 ft 6 in (7.47 m)
- Upper wingspan: 33 ft (10 m)
- Lower wingspan: 31 ft (9.4 m)
- Height: 9 ft (2.7 m)
- Wing area: 300 sq ft (28 m^{2})
- Empty weight: 1,300 lb (590 kg)
- Gross weight: 2,100 lb (953 kg)
- Fuel capacity: 43 US gal (36 imp gal; 160 L)
- Powerplant: 1 × Curtiss OX-5 water-cooled V-8, 90 hp (67 kW)
- Propellers: 2-bladed fixed-pitch propeller

Performance

- Maximum speed: 120 mph (190 km/h, 100 kn)
- Cruise speed: 95 mph (153 km/h, 83 kn)
- Stall speed: 38 mph (61 km/h, 33 kn)
- Range: 400 mi (640 km, 350 nmi)
- Service ceiling: 15,000 ft (4,600 m)
- Rate of climb: 800 ft/min (4.1 m/s) initial
- Landing speed:38 mph (61 km/h; 33 kn)
