= Louie Bellson =

American jazz drummer (1924–2009)

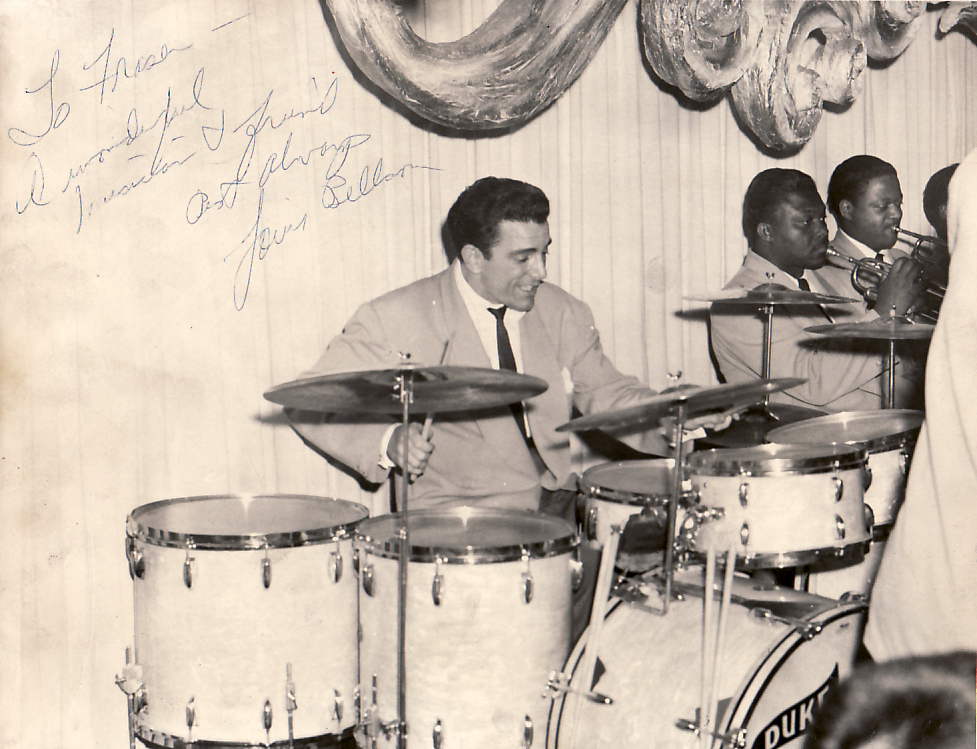
- From left: Louie Bellson, Cat Anderson, and Clark Terry at the Palomar Supper Club, April 19, 1952, with the Duke Ellington Orchestra; photo courtesy of Fraser MacPherson estate

Background information
- Born: Luigi Paolino Alfredo Francesco Antonio Balassoni; July 6, 1924; Rock Falls, Illinois
- Died: February 14, 2009 (aged 84) Los Angeles, California
- Genres: Jazz, big band, swing
- Occupations: Musician, composer, arranger, bandleader
- Instrument: Drums
- Years active: 1931–2009
- Labels: Roulette, Concord, Pablo, Musicmasters
- Formerly of: Duke Ellington Orchestra
- Spouse: Pearl Bailey (m. 1952; died 1990)

Louie Bellson (born Luigi Paolino Alfredo Francesco Antonio Balassoni, July 6, 1924 – February 14, 2009) was an American jazz drummer, composer, arranger, bandleader, and jazz educator. He is credited with pioneering the use of two bass drums. His name was often seen in sources as Louis Bellson, although he himself preferred the spelling Louie.

Bellson and his wife, actress and singer Pearl Bailey (married from 1952 until Bailey's death in 1990), had the second highest number of appearances at the White House (only Bob Hope had more).

Bellson was a vice president at Remo, a drum company. He was inducted into the Modern Drummer Hall of Fame in 1985.

== Biography ==
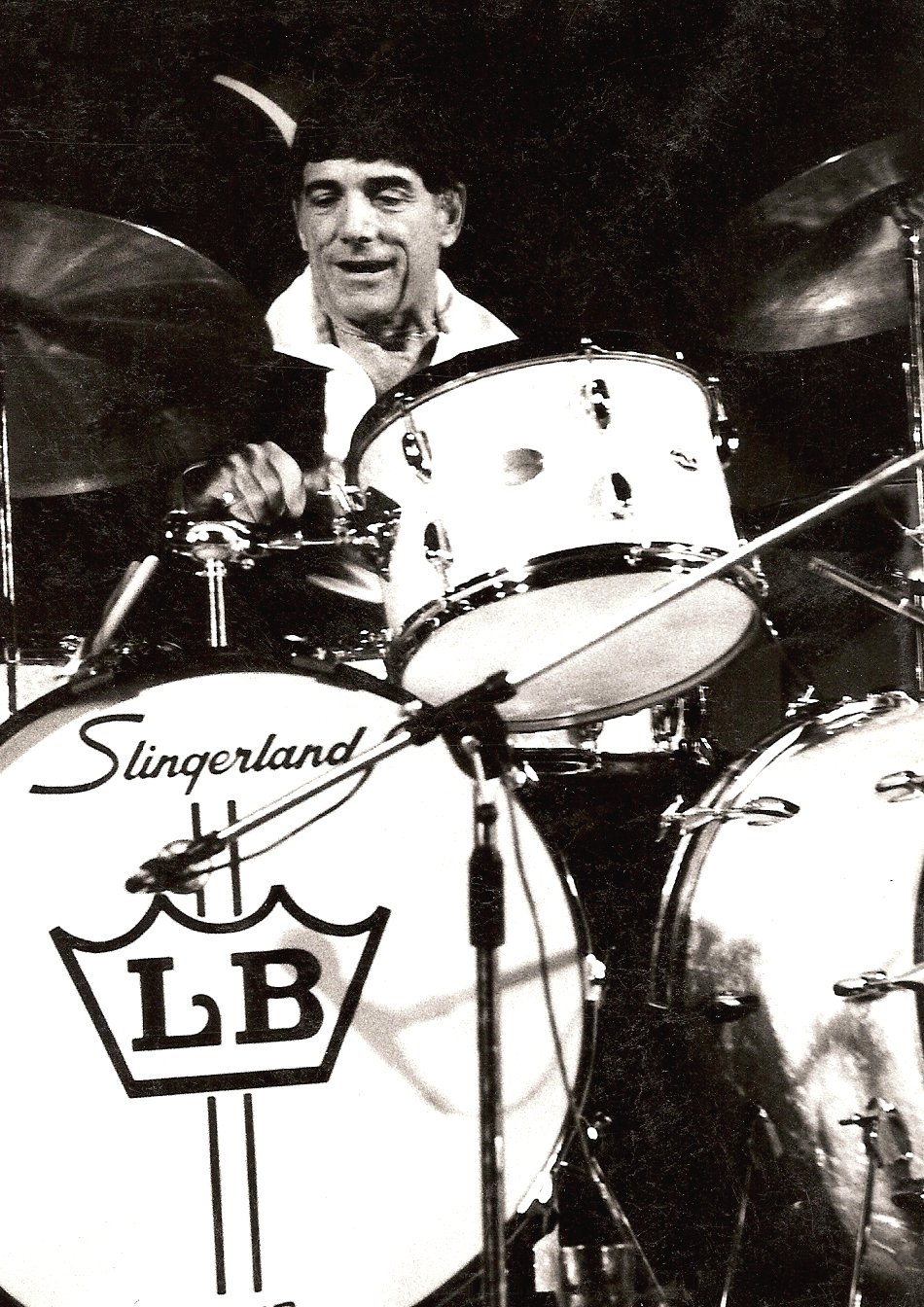
Bellson playing in 1980

Bellson was born in Rock Falls, Illinois, in 1924, where his father owned a music store. He started playing drums at three years of age. While still a young child, Bellson's father moved the family and music store to Moline, Illinois. At 15, he pioneered using two bass drums at the same time, a technique he invented in his high school art class. At age 17, he triumphed over 40,000 drummers to win the Slingerland National Gene Krupa contest.

After graduating from Moline High School in 1942, he worked with big bands throughout the 1940s, with Benny Goodman, Tommy Dorsey, Harry James, and Duke Ellington. In 1952, he married jazz singer Pearl Bailey. During the 1950s, he played with the Dorsey Brothers, Jazz at the Philharmonic, acted as Bailey's music director, and recorded as a leader for Norgran Records and Verve Records.

Over the years, his sidemen included Ray Brown, Pete and Conte Candoli, Chuck Findley, John Heard, Roger Ingram, Don Menza, Blue Mitchell, Larry Novak, Nat Pierce, Frank Rosolino, Bobby Shew, Clark Terry, and Snooky Young.

In an interview in 2005 with Jazz Connection magazine, he cited as influences Jo Jones, Sid Catlett, and Chick Webb. "I have to give just dues to two guys who really got me off on the drums – Big Sid Catlett and Jo Jones. They were my influences. All three of us realized what Jo Jones did and it influenced a lot of us. We all three looked to Jo as the 'Papa' who really did it. Gene helped bring the drums to the foreground as a solo instrument. Buddy was a great natural player. But we also have to look back at Chick Webb's contributions, too."

During the 1960s, he returned to Ellington's orchestra for Emancipation Proclamation Centennial stage production, My People in and for A Concert of Sacred Music, which is sometimes called The First Sacred Concert. Ellington called these concerts "the most important thing I have ever done."

Bellson's album The Sacred Music of Louie Bellson and the Jazz Ballet appeared in 2006. In May 2009, Francine Bellson told The Jazz Joy and Roy syndicated radio show, "I like to call (Sacred) 'how the Master used two maestros,'" adding, "When (Ellington) did his sacred concert back in 1965 with Louie on drums, he told Louie that the sacred concerts were based on 'in-the-beginning,' the first three words of the Bible." She recalled how Ellington explained to Louie that "in the beginning there was lightning and thunder and that's you!" Ellington exclaimed, pointing out that Louie's drums were the thunder. Both Ellington and Louie, says Mrs. Bellson, were deeply religious. "Ellington told Louie, 'You ought to do a sacred concert of your own' and so it was," said Bellson, adding, "'The Sacred Music of Louie Bellson' combines symphony, big band and choir, while 'The Jazz Ballet' is based on the vows of Holy Matrimony..."

On December 5, 1971, he took part in a memorial concert at London's Queen Elizabeth Hall for drummer Frank King. This tribute show also featured Buddy Rich and British drummer Kenny Clare. The orchestra was led by Irish trombonist Bobby Lamb and American trombonist Raymond Premru. A few years later, Rich (often called the world's greatest drummer) paid Bellson a compliment by asking him to lead his band on tour while he (Rich) was temporarily disabled by a back injury. Bellson accepted.

On February 14, 2009, Bellson died at age 84 from complications of a broken hip suffered in December 2008 and Parkinson's disease. He was remembered by The Mercury News as, "the legendary San Jose drummer and band leader who played with jazz greats for more than six decades." He is buried next to his father in Riverside Cemetery, Moline, Illinois.

== Compositions and arrangements ==
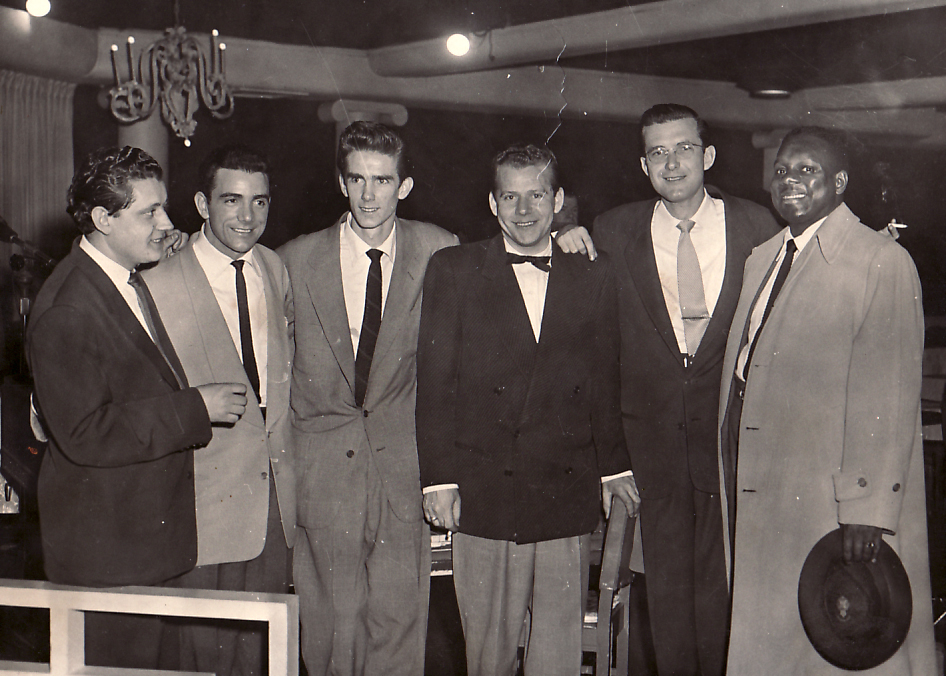
From left: Chris Gage, Louie Bellson, Stan "Cuddles" Johnson, Tony Gage, Fraser MacPherson, Harry Carney (Photo from the Fraser MacPherson estate)

As a creator of music, both written and improvised, his compositions and arrangements embrace jazz, jazz/rock/fusion, romantic orchestral suites, symphonic works and a ballet. Bellson was also a poet and a lyricist. His only Broadway venture, Portofino (1958) closed after three performances.

As an author, he published more than a dozen books on drums and percussion. He was at work with his biographer on a book chronicling his career and bearing the same name as one of his compositions, "Skin Deep". In addition, "The London Suite" (recorded on his album Louie in London) was performed at the Hollywood Pilgrimage Bowl before a record-breaking audience. The three-part work includes a choral section in which a 12-voice choir sings lyrics penned by Bellson. Part One is the band's rousing "Carnaby Street", a collaboration with Jack Hayes.

In 1987, at the Percussive Arts Society convention in Washington, D.C., Bellson and Harold Farberman performed a major orchestral work titled "Concerto for Jazz Drummer and Full Orchestra", the first piece ever written specifically for jazz drummer and full symphony orchestra. This work was recorded by the Bournemouth Symphony Orchestra in England, and was released by the Swedish label BIS.

== Drum tutoring ==
Bellson was known throughout his career to conduct drum and band clinics at high schools, colleges and music stores.

Bellson maintained a tight schedule of clinics and performances of both big bands and small bands in colleges, clubs and concert halls. In between, he continued to record and compose, resulting in more than 100 albums and more than 300 compositions. Bellson's Telarc debut recording, Louie Bellson And His Big Band: Live From New York, was released in June 1994. He also created new drum technology for Remo, of which he was vice-president.

Bellson received an honorary Doctor of Humane Letters in 1985 at Northern Illinois University. As of 2005, among other performing activities, Bellson had visited his home town of Rock Falls, Illinois, every July for Louie Bellson Heritage Days, a weekend in his honor close to his July 6 birthday, with receptions, music clinics and other performances by Bellson. At the 2004 event celebrating his 80th birthday, Bellson said, "I'm not that old; I'm 40 in this leg, and 40 in the other leg." He celebrated his birthday every year at the River Music Experience in Davenport, Iowa.

== Awards and honors ==
Bellson was voted into the Halls of Fame for Modern Drummer magazine, in 1985, and the Percussive Arts Society, in 1978. Yale University named him a Duke Ellington Fellow in 1977. He received an honorary doctorate from Northern Illinois University in 1985. He performed his original concert – Tomus I, II, III – with the Washington Civic Symphony in historic Constitution Hall in 1993. A combination of full symphony orchestra, big-band ensemble and 80-voice choir, "Tomus" was a collaboration of music by Bellson and lyrics by his late wife, Pearl Bailey. Bellson was a nine-time Grammy Award nominee.

In January 1994, Bellson received the NEA Jazz Masters Award from the National Endowment for the Arts. As one of three recipients, he was lauded by NEA chair Jane Alexander, who said, "These colossal talents have helped write the history of jazz in America."

== Personal life ==
On November 19, 1952, Bellson married American actress and singer Pearl Bailey, in London. Bellson and Bailey adopted a son, Tony, in the mid-1950s, and a daughter, Dee Dee (born April 20, 1960). After Bailey's death in 1990, Bellson married Francine Wright in September 1992. Wright, who had trained as a physicist and engineer at MIT, became his manager. The union lasted until his death. Dee Dee Bellson died on July 4, 2009, at age 49, within five months of her father.

== Discography ==
=== As leader/co-leader ===
- 1952 Just Jazz All Stars (Capitol)
- 1954 Louis Bellson and His Drums (Norgran)
- 1955 Skin Deep (Norgran) compiles Belson's 10-inch LPs The Amazing Artistry of Louis Bellson and The Exciting Mr. Bellson
- 1954 The Exciting Mr. Bellson and His Big Band (Norgran)
- 1954 Louis Bellson with Wardell Gray (Norgran)
- 1954 Louis Bellson Quintet (Norgran) also released as Concerto for Drums by Louis Bellson
- 1954 Journey into Love (Norgan) also released as Two in Love
- 1955 The Driving Louis Bellson (Norgran)
- 1956 The Hawk Talks (Norgran)
- 1957 Drumorama! (Verve)
- 1959 Let's Call It Swing (Verve)
- 1959 Music, Romance and Especially Love (Verve)
- 1957 Louis Bellson at The Flamingo (Verve)
- 1959 Live in Stereo at the Flamingo Hotel, Vol. 1: June 28, 1959
- 1961 Drummer's Holiday (Verve)
- 1960 The Brilliant Bellson Sound (Verve)
- 1960 Louis Bellson Swings Jule Styne (Verve)
- 1961 Around the World in Percussion (Roulette)
- 1962 Big Band Jazz from the Summit (Roulette)
- 1962 Happy Sounds (Roulette) with Pearl Bailey
- 1962 The Mighty Two (Roulette) with Gene Krupa
- 1964 Explorations (Roulette) with Lalo Schifrin
- 1965 Are You Ready for This? (Roost) with Buddy Rich
- 1965 Thunderbird (Impulse!)
- 1967 Repercussion (Studio2Stereo)
- 1968 Breakthrough! (Project 3)
- 1970 Louie in London (DRG)
- 1971 Are You Ready for This? (Roost / Roulette) with Buddy Rich
- 1972 Conversations (Vocalion) with Kenny Clare and Buddy Rich
- 1974 150 MPH (Concord)
- 1974 Louie Rides Again (Percussion Power)
- 1975 The Louis Bellson Explosion (Pablo)
- 1975 The Drum Session (Philips Records with Shelly Manne, Willie Bobo & Paul Humphrey)
- 1976 Louie Bellson's 7 (Concord Jazz)
- 1977 Ecue Ritmos Cubanos (Pablo) with Walfredo de los Reyes
- 1978 Raincheck (Concord)
- 1978 Note Smoking
- 1978 Louis Bellson Jam with Blue Mitchell (Pablo)
- 1978 Matterhorn: Louie Bellson Drum Explosion
- 1978 Sunshine Rock (Pablo)
- 1978 Prime Time (Concord Jazz)
- 1979 Dynamite (Concord Jazz)
- 1979 Side Track (Concord Jazz)
- 1979 Louis Bellson, With Bells On! (Vogue Jazz (UK))
- 1980 London Scene (Concord Jazz)
- 1980 Live at Ronnie Scott's (DRG)
- 1982 Hi Percussion (Accord)
- 1982 Cool, Cool Blue (Pablo)
- 1982 The London Gig (Pablo)
- 1983 Loose Walk
- 1984 Don't Stop Now! (Capri)
- 1986 Farberman: Concerto for Jazz Drummer; Shchedrin: Carmen Suite (BIS)
- 1987 Intensive Care
- 1988 Hot (Nimbus)
- 1989 Jazz Giants (Musicmasters)
- 1989 East Side Suite (Musicmasters)
- 1990 Airmail Special: A Salute to the Big Band Masters (Musicmasters)
- 1992 Live at the Jazz Showcase (Concord Jazz)
- 1992 Peaceful Thunder (Musicmasters)
- 1994 Live from New York (Telarc)
- 1994 Black Brown & Beige (Musicmasters)
- 1994 Cool Cool Blue (Original Jazz Classics)
- 1994 Salute (Chiaroscuro)
- 1995 I'm Shooting High (Four Star)
- 1995 Explosion Band (Exhibit)
- 1995 Salute (Chiaroscuro)
- 1995 Live at Concord Summer Festival (Concord Jazz)
- 1996 Their Time Was the Greatest (Concord Jazz)
- 1997 Air Bellson (Concord Jazz)
- 1998 The Art of Chart (Concord Jazz)

=== As sideman ===
With Count Basie

- Back with Basie (Roulette, 1962)
- Basie in Sweden (Roulette, 1962)
- Pop Goes the Basie (Reprise, 1965)
- Basie's in the Bag (Brunswick, 1967)
- The Happiest Millionaire (Coliseum, 1967)
- Count Basie Jam Session at the Montreux Jazz Festival 1975 (Pablo, 1975)

With Benny Carter

- Benny Carter Plays Pretty (Norgran, 1954)
- New Jazz Sounds (Norgran, 1954)
- In the Mood for Swing (MusicMasters, 1988)

With Duke Ellington

- Ellington Uptown (Columbia, 1952)
- My People (Contact, 1963)
- A Concert of Sacred Music (RCA Victor, 1965)
- Ella at Duke's Place (Verve, 1965)

With Johnny Hodges

- Used to Be Duke (Norgran, 1954)
- The Blues (Norgran, 1955)

With Harry James

- Juke Box Jamboree (Columbia CL 615, 1955)
- Live At The Riverboat (Dot DLP 3728/DLP 25728, 1966)
- Harry James and His Orchestra 1948–49 (Big Band Landmarks Vol. X & XI, 1969)

With Linda Ronstadt

- Lush Life (Asylum, 1984)
- For Sentimental Reasons (Asylum, 1986)

With Toni Tennille

- More Than You Know (Mirage, 1984)
- Do It Again (USA Music Group, 1988)

With others

- Count Basie and Oscar Peterson, Count Basie Encounters Oscar Peterson (Pablo, 1975)
- Count Basie and Zoot Sims, Basie & Zoot (Pablo, 1975)
- Tony Bennett, I've Gotta Be Me (Columbia, 1969)
- James Brown, Soul on Top (King, 1970)
- Buddy Collette, Porgy & Bess (Interlude, 1959)
- Ella Fitzgerald and Louis Armstrong, Ella and Louis Again (Verve, 1957)
- Herb Geller, The Herb Geller Quartet (V.S.O.P., 1994)
- Dizzy Gillespie, Roy and Diz (Clef, 1954)
- Stephane Grappelli, Classic Sessions: Stephane Grappelli, with Phil Woods and Louie Bellson (RTV, 1987)
- Oscar Peterson, The Tenor Giants Featuring Oscar Peterson (Pablo, 1975)
- Mel Powell, The Return of Mel Powell (Chiaroscuro, 1987)
- Sonny Stitt, Stomp Off Let's Go (Flying Dutchman, 1976)
- The Trumpet Kings, The Trumpet Kings at Montreux '75 (Pablo, 1975)
- Big Joe Turner, The Bosses (Pablo, 1974)
- Sarah Vaughan, How Long Has This Been Going On? (Pablo, 1978)
- Ben Webster, Music for Loving (Norgran, 1954)
- Joe Williams, With Love (Temponic, 1972)

== DVD ==
- 2001 Classic Drum Solos and Drum Battles DVD (Hal Leonard)

== Filmography ==
- 2003 Louis Bellson and His Big Band (VIEW)
- 2007 Cobham Meets Bellson (VIEW)

== See also ==
- List of jazz arrangers
- List of music arrangers
