= Jimmy Jones (pianist) =

American jazz pianist (1918–1982)

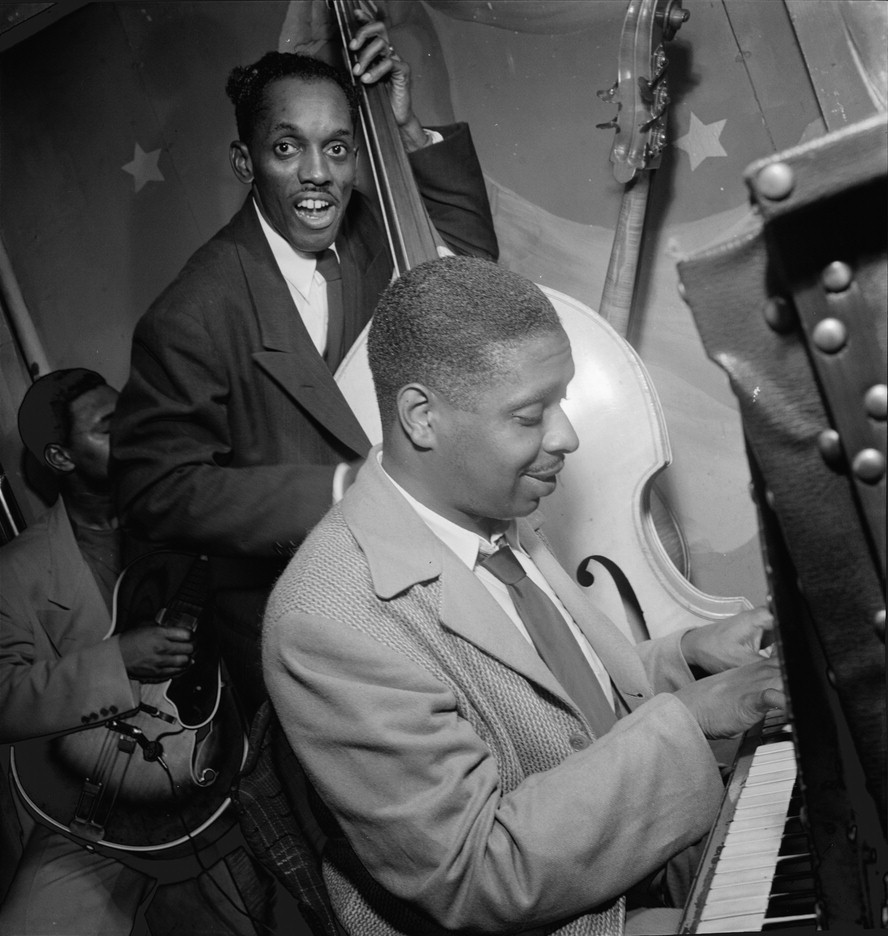
Jimmy Jones and John Levy, 1947 Photography by William P. Gottlieb

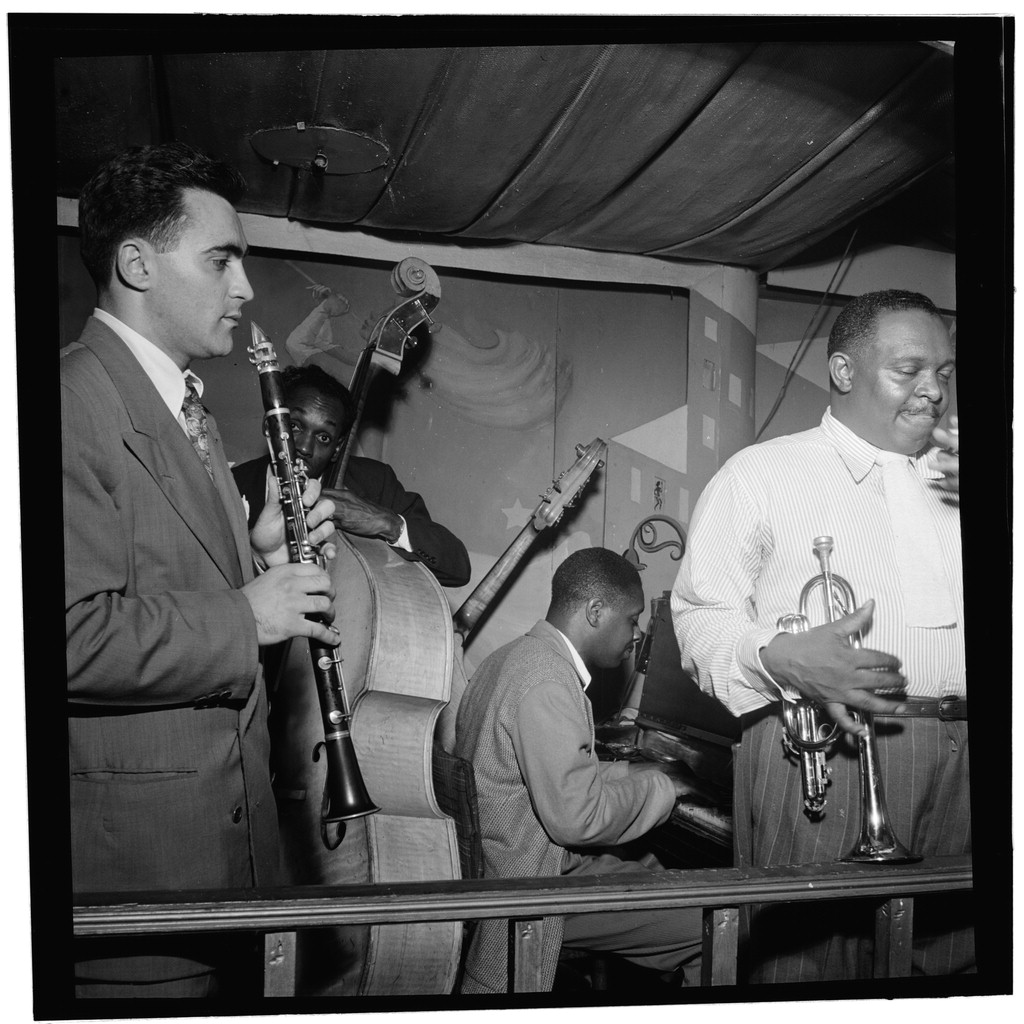
Sol Yaged, John Levy, Jimmy Jones, and Rex Stewart, Pied Piper, New York, c. September 1946 Photograph by William P. Gottlieb

James Henry Jones (December 30, 1918 – April 29, 1982) was an American jazz pianist and arranger.

== Biography ==
Jimmy Jones was born in Memphis, Tennessee on December 30, 1918. He grew up in Chicago. As a child, he learned guitar and piano. Jones notes that playing guitar "influenced my piano harmonically ... in thinking in terms of groups of notes rather than single lines .... [W]hen I played guitar it was more or less in a chord style like Wes Montgomery's."

Jones worked in Chicago orchestras from 1936 and played in a trio with Stuff Smith from 1943 to 1945. He made his first recordings, under Smith's leadership, in 1944. Following this, he played with Don Byas, Dizzy Gillespie (1945), J.C. Heard (1945–47), Buck Clayton (1946) and Etta Jones. He also recorded a series of piano solos in 1947, including Debussy's Clair de lune and works by Duke Ellington and Juan Tizol. Jazz critic Stanley Dance notes, "From the very beginning, Jones insisted, his greatest inspiration was Duke Ellington, and he had been encouraged in this by his parents, who took him to hear Ellington whenever he played in Chicago." Jones also particularly admired Art Tatum and considered him to be "the quintessential pianist." Anatol Schenker called Jones' 1947 solo recordings "extraordinary," noting his "delicate and highly personal use of block chords .... His playing on these solos makes one ponder whether Jimmy Jones played on a fragile keyboard made of glass."

Jones accompanied Sarah Vaughan from 1947 to 1952 and then again from 1954 to 1958 after a long illness, becoming her musical director. In 1954, he made a trio recording, played on a classic album with Vaughan and Clifford Brown, and accompanied the latter on his European tour. Just a week after the Vaughan/Brown album, he recorded another classic album with Brown and Helen Merrill. In 1958, he accompanied Anita O'Day in her celebrated appearance at the Newport Jazz Festival, documented in the film Jazz on a Summer's Day, and worked with other singers such as Dakota Staton, Pat Suzuki, and Morgana King around this time. Jones enjoyed the challenge of being an accompanist and said, "You always have to be musically aware. Listen to the great accompanists—Bobby Tucker with Billy Eckstine, Hank Jones with Ella, Ellis Larkins. They illustrate what I mean."

As a pianist and arranger in New York City, he worked in the 1960s with Harry Belafonte, Johnny Hodges, Budd Johnson, Nat Gonella, and Clark Terry, among others. He accompanied Chris Connor on her version of "Where Flamingoes Fly" and played with Ellington's orchestra on recordings with Ella Fitzgerald for the album Ella at Duke's Place. Jones also "occasionally sat in for [Ellington] and rehearsed with the orchestra" and became Fitzgerald's musical director. He enjoyed "a very long and close musical relationship with Ellington and [Billy] Strayhorn."

Jones did a set with his trio (Jimmy Hughart and Grady Tate) at the Antibes Jazz Festival in 1966 and the following year toured with Jazz at the Philharmonic. In the 1970s, he worked with Kenny Burrell and Cannonball Adderley. Although "gravely ill," Jones participated in Burrell's Ellington Is Forever tribute recordings, contributing a brief solo version of Strayhorn's "Take the "A" Train" as the first volume's closer. "As Jimmy sounded the final note ... Jerome Richardson murmured with awe, 'He got everything there was to get out of that. He has just put it in requiem status.'" However, lack of interest led Jones to return to his hometown of Memphis "[c]ompletely disillusioned."

In the course of his career, Jones played piano on recordings by Harry Sweets Edison, Ben Webster, Big Joe Turner, Coleman Hawkins, Frank Wess, Milt Jackson, Sidney Bechet, Sonny Rollins, Sonny Stitt, and Thad Jones, among others, and worked as an arranger for Wes Montgomery, Nancy Wilson, Sandler and Young, Shirley Horn, Joe Williams, Billy Taylor, Carmen McRae, and Chris Connor, becoming "[o]ne of the most sought after arrangers in New York."

Schenker called Jones "a very competent occasionally dazzling pianist with an extremely elaborate technique and technical skills. His modern way of arranging is well recognized, too." Jordi Pujol notes that Jones possessed "an uncanny ability to strike a delicate balance of restraint and richness" in his playing. Dave Brubeck cited Jones as an influence and said of him: "He didn't like to solo. Harmonically, though, he was one of the greatest players I ever heard."

Jones died in Burbank, California on April 29, 1982 at the age of 63.

== Discography ==
=== As leader ===
- "Jimmy Jones' Big Eight": Rex Stewart And the Ellingtonians (Riverside, OJC, 1946) with Harry Carney, Lawrence Brown, Otto Hardwick, Ted Nash, Billy Taylor, Shelly Manne
- "Jimmy Jones' Big Four": Giants of Small Band Swing, Vol. 1 & 2 (Riverside, OJC, 1946) with Budd Johnson, Al Hall, Denzil Best
- Jimmy Jones Trio with Joe Benjamin, bass, and Roy Haynes, drums (Vogue, 1954, 10" LP, mono, recorded in Paris; reissued by Fresh Sound Records in 2023 as part of The Splendid Mr. Jones, along with recordings from 1947 and 1952)

=== As sideman ===
With Kenny Burrell

- Ellington Is Forever (Fantasy, 1975)
- Ellington Is Forever Volume Two (Fantasy, 1975)

With Buck Clayton

- How Hi the Fi (Columbia, 1954)
- Buck Meets Ruby (Vanguard, 1954) with Ruby Braff
- Jumpin' at the Woodside (Columbia, 1955)

With Harry Edison

- The Swinger (Verve, 1958)
- Mr. Swing (Verve, 1958 [1960])
- Harry Edison Swings Buck Clayton (Verve, 1958) with Buck Clayton

With Ella Fitzgerald

- Ella at Duke's Place (Verve, 1965)
- 30 by Ella (Verve, 1968) with Benny Carter

With Johnny Griffin

- White Gardenia (Riverside, 1961)

With Johnny Hodges

- Johnny Hodges with Billy Strayhorn and the Orchestra (Verve, 1962)
- Everybody Knows Johnny Hodges (Impulse!, 1964)
- Blue Pyramid (Verve, 1966) with Wild Bill Davis
- Blue Notes (Verve, 1966) as arranger and conductor
- Triple Play (RCA Victor, 1967) as performer and arranger

With Illinois Jacquet

- Swing's the Thing (Clef, 1956)

With Budd Johnson

- Budd Johnson and the Four Brass Giants (Riverside, 1960)

With Thad Jones

- Mad Thad (Period Records, 1957; Jimmy Jones plays on 3 tracks)
- The Jones Boys (Period Records, 1957) with Eddie Jones, Quincy Jones, and Jo Jones

With Beverly Kenney

- Sings with Jimmy Jones and 'The Basie-Ites' (Roost, 1957)

With Helen Merrill

- Helen Merrill (Em Arcy, 1955) Produced by Quincy Jones
- You've Got a Date with the Blues (MetroJazz, 1959), as performer and arranger

With Joe Newman

- Joe Newman with Woodwinds (Roulette, 1958)

With Paul Quinichette

- Moods (EmArcy, 1954)

With Sonny Stitt

- New York Jazz (Verve, 1956)
- The Saxophones of Sonny Stitt (Roost, 1958)
- A Little Bit of Stitt (Roost, 1959)
- The Sonny Side of Stitt (Roost, 1959)
- Stittsville (Roost, 1960)
- Sonny Side Up (Roost, 1960)
- Stitt in Orbit (Roost, 1960 [1963])

With Clark Terry

- Top and Bottom Brass (Riverside, 1959)

With Sarah Vaughan

- Sarah Vaughan with Clifford Brown (Em Arcy, 1955)
- In the Land of Hi-Fi (EmArcy, 1955)
- Swingin' Easy (EmArcy, 1957, tracks 3, 5, 6, 9, and 13)
- At Mister Kelly's (EmArcy, 1957)

With Ben Webster

- The Soul of Ben Webster (Verve, 1958)
- Ben Webster and Associates (Verve, 1959)

With Lee Wiley

- Duologue (Storyville, 1954)

With Nancy Wilson

- The Sound of Nancy Wilson (Capitol, 1968)
- Hurt So Bad (Capitol, 1969)

With Monica Zetterlund

- The Lost Tapes at Bell Sound Studios (BMG Sweden, recorded 1960, released 1996)

=== As arranger ===
With Johnny Hodges

- Don't Sleep in the Subway (Verve, 1967)

With Shirley Horn

- Loads of Love (Mercury, 1963)

With Milt Jackson

- The Ballad Artistry of Milt Jackson (Atlantic, 1959)
- For Someone I Love (Riverside, 1963)
- Feelings (Pablo, 1976)

With Sandler and Young

- Pretty Things Come in Twos (Capitol)
- Honey Come Back (Capitol)
- Odds and Ends (Capitol)

With Billy Taylor

- Kwamina (Mercury, 1961)

With Nancy Wilson

- Easy (Capitol, 1968)
- Nancy (Capitol, 1969)
