= Jimmy Forrest (musician) =

American jazz musician (1920–1980)

- Born: James Robert Forrest Jr. January 24, 1920; St. Louis, Missouri, U.S.
- Died: August 26, 1980 (aged 60) Grand Rapids, Michigan, U.S.
- Genres: Jazz; R&B; blues
- Occupation: Musician
- Instrument: Tenor saxophone
- Years active: 1935–1980
- Labels: United; Prestige; Delmark

James Robert Forrest Jr. (January 24, 1920 – August 26, 1980) was an American jazz musician who played tenor saxophone throughout his career.

Forrest is known for his first solo recording of "Night Train". It reached No. 1 on the Billboard R&B chart in March 1952, and stayed at the top for seven weeks. "Hey Mrs. Jones" (No. 3 R&B) and "Bolo Blues" were his other hits. All were made for United Records, for which he recorded between 1951 and 1953; he recorded frequently as both a sideman and a bandleader.

== Biography ==
Born in St. Louis, Missouri, United States, Forrest played alongside Fate Marable as a young man. He was with Jay McShann in 1940-42 and with Andy Kirk from 1942 until 1948 when he joined Duke Ellington. During the early 1950s, Forrest led his own combos. He also played with Miles Davis, in early 1952 at The Barrel Club. After his solo career, he played in small combos with Harry "Sweets" Edison and Al Grey, as well as appearing with Count Basie.

Late in life Forrest married Betty Tardy (November 30, 1929 – October 21, 2011), and settled in Grand Rapids, Michigan, where he died in August 1980, aged 60, from heart failure.

=== Other media ===
Forrest performs an extended version of "Night Train" with the Basie Orchestra in the 1979 film The Last of the Blue Devils.

Forrest's version of "Night Train" was the theme song of a nightly rhythm and blues radio program in the Houston, Texas area. Also called Night Train, the program was hosted by William A. "Rascal" McCaskill, and was broadcast on KREL-AM between 1954 and 1957.

During the late 1970s, Forrest appeared with an all-star line-up in New York, including Howard McGhee on trumpet, John Hicks on piano, Major Holley on bass, and Charlie Persip on drums.

In his 2000 book, The Devil and Sonny Liston, author Nick Tosches notes that Forrest's music was a favorite of heavyweight boxer Sonny Liston, also from St. Louis, who would listen to "Night Train" and other Forrest music during training sessions and before fights.

== Discography ==
=== As leader ===
- 1951: Night Train (United ULP-002 [rel. 1955]; reissue: Delmark DL-435 [rel. 1978])
- 1959: All the Gin Is Gone (Delmark DL-404 [rel. 1964]) – with Harold Mabern, Grant Green
- 1959: Black Forrest (Delmark DL-427 [rel. 1972]) – with Harold Mabern, Grant Green
- 1960: Forrest Fire (New Jazz NJLP-8250) – with Larry Young
- 1961: Out of the Forrest (Prestige PRLP-7202)
- 1961: Sit Down and Relax with Jimmy Forrest (Prestige PRLP-7235 [rel. 1962])
- 1961: Most Much! (Prestige PRLP-7218)
- 1962: Soul Street (New Jazz NJLP-8293 [rel. 1964])
- 1969: The Best of Jimmy Forrest (Prestige PR-7712) – compilation of tracks from Prestige 7202, 7218, 7223, 7235, and New Jazz 8293.
- 1978: Live at Rick's (Aviva AV-6002 [rel. 1979]) – with Al Grey, Shirley Scott
- 1978: Truly Wonderful (Stash STCD-552 [rel. 1992]) – with Al Grey, Shirley Scott
- 1978: Night Train Revisited (Storyville STCD-8293 [rel. 1999]) – with Al Grey, Shirley Scott
- 1978: Heart of the Forrest (Palo Alto PA-8021 [rel. 1982]; reissue: Muse MCD-5509, 1995) – with Shirley Scott
- 1980: O.D. (Out 'Dere) (Grey Forrest GF-1001) – with Al Grey, Don Patterson

=== As sideman ===
With Cat Anderson

- Cat on a Hot Tin Horn (Mercury, 1958)

With Count Basie

- In Europe (LRC, 1974)
- Fun Time (Pablo, 1975)
- Basie Big Band (Pablo, 1975)
- I Told You So (Pablo, 1976)
- Prime Time (Pablo, 1977)
- Montreux '77 (Pablo, 1977)

With Miles Davis

- Live at The Barrel (Prestige P-7858, 1952 [rel. 1983]; reissued on CD as Prestige PCD-24117 [rel. 1992] with a new title: Our Delight: Recorded Live At The Barrel, St. Louis)
- Live at The Barrel, Volume Two (Prestige P-7860, 1952 [rel. 1984]; reissued on CD as Prestige PCD-24117 [rel. 1992] with a new title: Our Delight: Recorded Live At The Barrel, St. Louis)

With Harry "Sweets" Edison

- The Swinger (Verve, 1958)
- Mr. Swing (Verve, 1958 [rel. 1960])
- Harry Edison Swings Buck Clayton (Verve, 1958) – with Buck Clayton
- Sweetenings (Roulette, 1958)
- Patented by Edison (Roulette, 1960)

With Bennie Green

- Swings the Blues (Enrica, 1959)
- Bennie Green (Time, 1960)
- Hornful of Soul aka Cat Walk (Bethlehem, 1960)

With Grant Green

- First Recordings CD Reissue - All the Gin is Gone / Black Forrest

With Al Grey

- Grey's Mood (Disques Black And Blue 33.085, 1973–1975; reissue: Classic Jazz CJ-118 [rel. 1979]; reissued on CD as Black & Blue BB-912 [rel. 2000])
- Struttin' and Shoutin' (Columbia FC-38505, 1976 [rel. 1983])
- Travelers Lounge Live (Travelers TRV-3001, 1977)
- Al Grey featuring Arnett Cobb (Disques Black And Blue 33.143, 1977; reissued on CD as Black & Blue BB-954 [rel. 2002] with a new title: Ain't That Funk For You)

With Jo Jones

- Vamp 'til Ready (Everest, 1960)

With Jack McDuff

- Tough 'Duff (Prestige, 1960)
- The Honeydripper (Prestige, 1961)

With Blue Mitchell

- Blue Mitchell (Mainstream, 1971)

With Oliver Nelson

- Soul Battle (Prestige PRLP-7223, 1960 [rel. 1962]) – with King Curtis

With Waymon Reed

- 46th and 8th (Artists House, 1977 [1979])

With Betty Roché

- Singin' & Swingin' (Prestige, 1960) – with Jack McDuff

With Joe Williams

- Together (Roulette, 1961) – with Harry "Sweets" Edison
- Joe Williams Live! A Swingin' Night at Birdland (Roulette, 1962)
