= Sweetenings =

Studio album by Harry "Sweets" Edison
- Released: 1958
- Recorded: November 12–14, 1958
- Studio: New York City, NY
- Genre: Jazz
- Length: 32:46
- Label: Roulette; SR 52023
- Producer: Teddy Reig

Harry "Sweets" Edison chronology
Harry Edison Swings Buck Clayton (1958)	Sweetenings (1958)	Patented by Edison (1960)

Sweetenings is an album by trumpeter Harry "Sweets" Edison featuring tracks recorded in 1958 which was originally released on the Roulette label.

== Reception ==
Professional ratings
Review scores
Source	Rating
AllMusic	3/5 stars

AllMusic awarded the album 3 stars and its review by Ken Dryden states, "Harry "Sweets" Edison added something special to any date in which he took part, but these 1958 sessions he led for Roulette are especially enjoyable".

== Track listing ==
All compositions by Harry "Sweets" Edison except as indicated

1. "Centerpiece" - 3:25
2. "Candy" (Alex Kramer, Mack David, Joan Whitney) - 2:30
3. "Jive at Five" (Count Basie, Edison) - 2:48
4. "Imagination" (Jimmy Van Heusen, Johnny Burke) - 2:33
5. "Louisiana" (J. C. Johnson, Andy Razaf) - 2:27
6. "Harriet" - 3:10
7. "It Happened in Monterey" (Billy Rose, Mabel Wayne) - 2:02
8. "If I Had You" (Jimmy Campbell, Reg Connelly, Ted Shapiro) - 3:14
9. "Paradise" (Nacio Herb Brown, Gordon Clifford) - 2:20
10. "(Back Home Again in) Indiana" (Ballard MacDonald, James F. Hanley) - 1:46
11. "Pussy Willow" - 3:58
12. "Sweetenings" - 2:33

== Personnel ==
- Harry "Sweets" Edison - trumpet
- Jimmy Forrest - tenor saxophone
- Kenny Drew Jimmy Jones - piano
- Joe Benjamin, John Simmons - bass
- Charlie Persip - drums
