= Mickey Sheen =

- Born: December 13, 1927; Brooklyn, New York City
- Died: March 25, 1987 (aged 59) Dix Hills, Long Island
- Genres: Jazz, swing
- Instrument: Drums

Mickey Sheen (born Milton Scheinblum, December 13, 1927 – March 25, 1987) was a jazz drummer known for swing and mainstream jazz.

Sheen was born in Brooklyn, New York City. He married Marilyn Feinstein and had two sons, Neil and Brian Sheen.

In the 1940s and 1950s Sheen worked with the Benny Goodman and Coleman Hawkins bands and accompanied singers such as Peggy Lee, Vikki Carr, Barbra Streisand, Debbie Reynolds and Eddie Fisher.

While in the service in 1946, Sheen was sent to Germany to join the Glenn Miller Army Air Force Band. In the late 1940s, Sheen and Cy Coleman performed on as many as 11 television shows a week for NBC while also making recordings, commercials, sound tracks, charity performances, radio spots and museum charity events.

Sheen also played drums on Going for Myself and Laughin' to Keep from Cryin', one of Lester Young's final studio sessions. Sheen also worked with Roy Eldridge, Charlie Shavers, Bud Freeman, Marty Napoleon, Ben Webster, Lester Young, Dizzy Gillespie and recorded with Charlie Shavers, Sol Yaged, Hank Jones, George Duvivier, Coleman Hawkins, Ray Brown, Roy Eldridge, Buck Clayton, and Herb Ellis. Sheen also gave drumming lessons to Sal Mineo for his title role in "The Gene Krupa Story".

Sheen later taught percussion at Five Towns College. He died of a heart attack at his home in Dix Hills on Long Island, and there is an ongoing scholarship at Five Town College in his name for students of percussion.

== Television performances ==
- The Bell Telephone Hour (1 episode, 1961)
- Music Hath Charms (1961) TV episode (with The Eddie Condon Jazz All-Stars)

== Recordings ==
- Mickey Sheen and the Swing Travelers - Have Swing Will Travel (1956)
- Harry "Sweets" Edison and Lester Young - Going for Myself (1957)
- Rex Stewart - Rendezvous With Rex (1958)
- Laughin' to Keep from Cryin' (1958)
- Jazz From Then Till Now (1958)
- The Napoleon Brothers: A Rare Musical Vintage (1958)
- Rex Stewart: Rendezvous with Rex (Felsted, 1958)
- Coleman Hawkins: Coleman Hawkins and Confrères (Verve, 1958), The High and Mighty Hawk (Felsted, 1958)
- We Three: A Jazz Approach To Stereo (1959)
- From Then Till Now (1960)
- Various Artists - Milton Jazz Concert (1963)
- Henry "Red" Allen - Nice! (1978)
