= Harry Sheppard (musician) =

American jazz vibraphone player (1928–2022)

- Born: April 1, 1928; Worcester, Massachusetts, U.S.
- Died: December 27, 2022 (aged 94)
- Genres: Jazz
- Occupation: Musician
- Instrument: Vibraphone
- Labels: Justice
- Website: www.harrysheppard.com

Harry Sheppard (April 1, 1928 – December 27, 2022) was an American jazz vibraphonist who recorded and played with Roy Eldridge, Charlie Shavers, Red Allen, Cozy Cole, Sol Yaged, Georgie Auld, Clark Terry, Al Cohn, Zoot Sims, Lana Cantrell, Billie Holiday, Benny Goodman, Duke Ellington, Ben Webster, Barbra Streisand, Doc Severinsen, and Coleman Hawkins. Sheppard grew up in Worcester, Massachusetts, moved to New York City, then moved in Houston in 1985 to care for his daughter, who died of cancer about a year later.

== Biography ==
Born in Worcester, Massachusetts, Sheppard received his first lesson at the age of eight from his brother. After serving in the Navy, he met his first wife, Betty Ann Miller, when she was 16, and he was 19. His first professional performance in New York was with the Sol Yaged Quintet. In 1954 Sheppard and his wife recorded vocals on the first cha-cha in English called "Cha Cha Cha in Blue." Their marriage lasted into the 1960s.

In 1958, Sheppard performed with Coleman Hawkins, Lester Young, Billie Holiday, and others on the TV program Art Ford's Jazz Party. He played with Benny Goodman in the 1960s. In the 1970s, he worked with Deagan to create the electric vibraphone. After a second marriage ended, he was single for decades until he met, and later married, Pam Bingham, a clarinetist in the Houston symphony. At 84, he suffered two strokes, surgeries on his carotid arteries and a tongue cancer diagnosis, but continued playing. Sheppard could be seen playing at Catbirds on Westheimer on most Sunday evenings.

Sheppard died on December 27, 2022, at the age of 94.

== Discography ==
- Blowing In from New York (44 Records, 1978)
- Viva Brazil (Justice, 1990)
- This-A-Way That-A-Way (Justice, 1991)
- Points Of View (Justice, 1992)
- Your Wish Is My Command – Sol Yaged & Tino Valpa with Harry Sheppard (Pine Hill Records, 2019)
