= Back to Back: Duke Ellington and Johnny Hodges Play the Blues =

Album by Duke Ellington

Back to Back

Studio album by Duke Ellington and Johnny Hodges
- Released: 1959
- Recorded: February 20, 1959 - Columbia Studios, New York
- Genre: Jazz
- Length: 40:02
- Label: Verve
- Producer: Norman Granz

Duke Ellington chronology
Jazz Party (1959)	Back to Back (1959)	Side by Side (1959)

Johnny Hodges chronology
Johnny Hodges and His Strings Play the Prettiest Gershwin (1958)	Back to Back (1959)	Side by Side (1959)

Professional ratings
Review scores
Source	Rating
Allmusic	3/5 stars
The Penguin Guide to Jazz Recordings	4/4 stars

Back to Back is a 1959 studio album by Johnny Hodges and Duke Ellington. It was followed by Side by Side (1959), which combines three tracks recorded at one of the same sessions with six tracks recorded in August 1958 by a different, Hodges-led group that did not include Ellington.

== Track listing ==
1. "Wabash Blues" (Fred Meinken, Dave Ringle) – 6:22
2. "Basin Street Blues" (Spencer Williams) – 8:05
3. "Beale Street Blues" (W. C. Handy) – 7:40
4. "Weary Blues" (Artie Matthews) – 6:50
5. "St. Louis Blues" (Handy) – 5:45
6. "Loveless Love" (Handy) – 6:05
7. "Royal Garden Blues" (Clarence Williams, Spencer Williams) – 5:20

== Personnel ==
- Duke Ellington – piano
- Johnny Hodges – alto saxophone
- Harry "Sweets" Edison – trumpet
- Les Spann – guitar
- Al Hall – bass (tracks 1 and 4)
- Sam Jones – bass (tracks 2, 3, 5, 6, 7)
- Jo Jones – drums

The tracks with Sam Jones were recorded February 20, 1959, while those with Al Hall were recorded 6 days later. A Fresh Sound CD adds the 3 tracks from Side by Side with this same group.
