= Sit Down and Relax with Jimmy Forrest =

Studio album by Jimmy Forrest
- Released: 1961
- Recorded: September 1, 1961
- Studio: Van Gelder Studio, Englewood Cliffs, New Jersey
- Genre: Jazz
- Length: 41:24
- Label: Prestige; PRLP 7235
- Producer: Esmond Edwards

Jimmy Forrest chronology
Out of the Forrest (1961)	Sit Down and Relax with Jimmy Forrest (1961)	Most Much! (1961)

Sit Down and Relax with Jimmy Forrest is an album by saxophonist Jimmy Forrest recorded in 1961 and released on the Prestige label.

== Reception ==
Professional ratings
Review scores
Source	Rating
Allmusic	3.5/5 stars
The Penguin Guide to Jazz Recordings	3/4 stars

Allmusic awarded the album 3½ stars stating it "gives one a good example of Jimmy Forrest's playing and fortunately his solos are not as relaxed and laidback as the album's title might imply".

== Track listing ==
1. "Tuxedo Junction" (Julian Dash, Buddy Feyne, Erskine Hawkins, William Johnson) - 6:30
2. "Organ Grinder's Swing" (Will Hudson, Irving Mills, Mitchell Parish) - 5:25
3. "Moonglow" (Eddie DeLange, Hudson, Mills) - 5:44
4. "Tin Tin Deo" (Gil Fuller, Chano Pozo) - 7:29
5. "Rocks in My Bed" (Duke Ellington) - 7:06
6. "The Moon Was Yellow" (Fred E. Ahlert, Edgar Leslie) - 4:20
7. "That's All" (Alan Brandt, Bob Haymes) - 4:54 Bonus track on CD reissue

== Personnel ==
- Jimmy Forrest - tenor saxophone
- Hugh Lawson - piano
- Calvin Newborn - guitar
- Tommy Potter - bass
- Clarence Johnston - drums

=== Production ===
- Esmond Edwards - supervisor
- Rudy Van Gelder - engineer
