= Jack Sprat (disambiguation) =

Jack Sprat is a nursery rhyme

Jack Sprat or Jack Spratt may also refer to:

- Jack Sprat (musician), American guitarist with Queen Esther (artist) and King Missile
- Jack Spratt (fictional detective), a character in novels by Jasper Fforde
- Jack Sprat, 1982 album by Yellowman, and title track written by W. Foster
- "Jack Spratt", a jazz track by Sonny Stitt on Sonny Stitt (album)
