= Soul Street (album) =

Studio album by Jimmy Forrest
- Released: 1962
- Recorded: September 9, 1960, September 1 and October 19, 1961 and June 1, 1962
- Studio: Van Gelder Studio, Englewood Cliffs, New Jersey
- Genre: Jazz
- Length: 49:09
- Label: New Jazz; NJLP 8293
- Producer: Esmond Edwards

Jimmy Forrest chronology
| Most Much! (1961) | Soul Street (1962) | Black Forrest (1972) |

Soul Street is an album by saxophonist Jimmy Forrest compiled from four different sessions between 1960 and 1962 (with the CD edition adding a bonus track from 1958) and released on New Jazz Some tracks appear as CD bonus tracks on other CDs but this is the only album on which the Big Band tracks appear.

== Reception ==
Professional ratings
Review scores
| Source | Rating |
|---|---|
| AllMusic | 3/5 stars |
| The Penguin Guide to Jazz Recordings | 3/4 stars |

AllMusic awarded the album 3 stars stating "A popular yet underrated tenor saxophonist, Jimmy Forrest is featured in several different settings".

== Track listing ==
All compositions by Jimmy Forrest except where noted.

1. "Soul Street" – 9:06
2. "I Love You" (Harry Archer, Harlan Thompson) – 5:13
3. "Sonny Boy" (Lew Brown, Buddy DeSylva, Ray Henderson) – 3:19
4. "Soft Summer Breeze" (Eddie Heywood, Judy Spencer) – 4:07
5. "Experiment in Terror" (Henry Mancini) – 2:25
6. "Just A-Sittin' and A-Rockin'" (Duke Ellington, Lee Gaines, Billy Strayhorn) – 3:56
7. "That's All" (Alan Brandt, Bob Haymes) – 4:51
8. "I Wanna Blow, Blow, Blow" (Jerry Valentine) – 5:53 Bonus track on CD reissue
- Recorded at Van Gelder Studio in Hackensack, New Jersey on August 29, 1958 (track 8) and at Van Gelder Studio in Englewood Cliffs, New Jersey on September 9, 1960 (track 1), September 1, 1960 (track 7), October 19, 1960 (tracks 2 & 3), 1961 and June 1, 1962 (tracks 4–6)

== Personnel ==
- Jimmy Forrest – tenor saxophone
- Art Farmer (track 8), Ernie Royal (tracks 4–6), Idrees Sulieman (track 8) – trumpet
- Jimmy Cleveland (tracks 4–6), George "Buster" Cooper (track 8) – trombone
- Jerome Richardson – alto saxophone, flute (track 8)
- George Barrow (tracks 4–6), King Curtis (track 1), Seldon Powell (tracks 4–6) – tenor saxophone
- Pepper Adams – baritone saxophone (track 8)
- Ray Bryant (track 8), Gene Casey (track 1), Hugh Lawson (tracks 2, 3 & 7), Chris Woods (tracks 4–6) – piano
- Tiny Grimes (track 8), Mundell Lowe (tracks 4–6), Calvin Newborn (track 7) – guitar
- Richard Davis (tracks 4–6), George Duvivier (track 1), Wendell Marshall (track 8), Tommy Potter (tracks 2, 3 & 7) – bass
- Roy Haynes (track 1), Osie Johnson (track 8), Clarence Johnston (tracks 2, 3 & 7), Ed Shaughnessy (tracks 4–6) – drums
- Ray Barretto – congas (tracks 2 & 3)
- Oliver Nelson – tenor saxophone (track 1), arranger and conductor (tracks 4–6)
- Jerry Valentine – arranger (track 8)
- Esmond Edwards – supervisor
- Rudy Van Gelder – engineer
