= Out of the Forrest =

Studio album by Jimmy Forrest
- Released: 1961
- Recorded: April 18, 1961
- Studios: Van Gelder Studio, Englewood Cliffs, New Jersey
- Genre: Jazz
- Length: 36:52
- Labels: Prestige; PRLP 7202
- Producer: Esmond Edwards

Jimmy Forrest chronology
Forrest Fire (1960)	Out of the Forrest (1961)	Sit Down and Relax with Jimmy Forrest (1961)

Out of the Forrest is an album by saxophonist Jimmy Forrest, recorded in 1961 and released on the Prestige label.

== Reception ==
Professional ratings
Review scores
Source	Rating
Down Beat	3/5 stars
Allmusic	4/5 stars
The Rolling Stone Jazz Record Guide	4/5 stars
The Penguin Guide to Jazz Recordings	3/4 stars

Allmusic awarded the album 4 stars stating "His highly expressive powers and ability to say a lot with a few notes is very much in evidence on this excellent set".

== Track listing ==
All compositions by Jimmy Forrest except as indicated

1. "Bolo Blues" - 4:07
2. "I Cried for You" (Gus Arnheim, Arthur Freed, Abe Lyman) - 5:03
3. "I've Got a Right to Cry" (Joe Liggins) - 4:22
4. "This Can't Be Love" (Lorenz Hart, Richard Rodgers) - 4:03
5. "By the River Sainte Marie" (Edgar Leslie, Harry Warren) - 5:13
6. "Yesterdays" (Otto Harbach, Jerome Kern) - 5:08
7. "Crash Program" (Forrest, Johnson) - 4:02
8. "That's All" (Alan Brandt, Bob Haymes) - 4:54

== Personnel ==
- Jimmy Forrest - tenor saxophone
- Joe Zawinul - piano
- Tommy Potter - bass
- Clarence Johnston - drums

=== Production ===
- Esmond Edwards - supervisor
- Rudy Van Gelder - engineer
