= Laughin' to Keep from Cryin' =

Studio album by Lester Young
- Released: 1958
- Recorded: February 8, 1958
- Genre: Jazz
- Length: 50:17
- Label: Verve MG V-8316
- Producer: Norman Granz

Lester Young chronology
Going for Myself (1956)	Laughin' to Keep from Cryin' (1958)	Pres and Teddy (1959)

Laughin' to Keep from Cryin' is a 1958 studio album by Lester Young featuring the trumpeters Harry "Sweets" Edison and Roy Eldridge.

== Reception ==
Professional ratings
Review scores
Source	Rating
Allmusic	4/5 stars
The Penguin Guide to Jazz Recordings	3.5/4 stars

Scott Yanow reviewed the album for Allmusic and wrote that "...this date apparently had a lot of difficulties but the recorded results are excellent. Young takes rare clarinet solos on two of the selections with his emotional statement on "They Can't Take That Away from Me" being one of the highpoints of his career."

== Track listing ==
1. "Salute to Benny" (Lester Young) - 8:32
2. "They Can't Take That Away from Me" (George Gershwin, Ira Gershwin) - 6:02
3. "Romping" (Young) - 11:42
4. "The Gypsy in My Soul" (Clay Boland, Moe Jaffe) - 4:14
5. "Please Don't Talk About Me When I'm Gone" (Sidney Clare, Sam H. Stept) - 6:11
6. Ballad medley: "The Very Thought of You"/"I Want a Little Girl"/"Blue and Sentimental" (Ray Noble)/(Murray Mencher, Billy Moll)/(Count Basie, Jerry Livingston, Mack David) - 6:38
7. "Mean to Me" (Fred E. Ahlert, Roy Turk) - 6:58

* tracks 6 & 7 are bonus tracks

== Personnel ==
- Lester Young - clarinet, tenor saxophone
- Harry "Sweets" Edison, Roy Eldridge - trumpet
- Herb Ellis - guitar
- Hank Jones - piano
- George Duvivier - double bass
- Mickey Sheen - drums

Production

- Sherniece Smith - art coordinator
- Hollis King, Sheldon Marks - art direction
- Francis Davis - liner notes
- JoDee Stringham - design
- Kevin Reeves - mastering
- Peter Keepnews - notes editing
- Cynthia Sesso - photo research
- Burt Goldblatt - photography
- Norman Granz - producer
- Tom Greenwood - production assistant, research assistant

== Charts ==
Chart performance for Laughin' to Keep from Cryin'
Chart (2026)	Peak position
Greek Albums (IFPI)	87
