= The Swinger (album) =

Studio album by Harry Edison
- Released: 1958
- Recorded: September 18, 1958
- Studios: New York City, NY
- Genre: Jazz
- Length: 37:04
- Labels: Verve; MG V-8295
- Producer: Norman Granz

Harry Edison chronology
Going for Myself (1957)	The Swinger (1958)	Mr. Swing (1958)

The Swinger is an album by trumpeter Harry Edison which was recorded in 1958 and released on the Verve label.

== Reception ==
Professional ratings
Review scores
Source	Rating
Allmusic	4.5/5 stars

The Allmusic review by Ron Wynn stated "Both torrid and mellow – this is striking Edison".

== Track listing ==
All compositions by Harry Edison except where noted.

1. "Pussy Willow" – 7:30
2. "The Very Thought of You" (Ray Noble) – 6:03
3. "Nasty" – 4:53
4. "The Strollers" – 6:52
5. "Sunday" (Chester Conn, Jule Styne, Bennie Krueger, Ned Miller) – 6:53
6. "Fair Ground" – 4:53

== Personnel ==
- Harry Edison – trumpet
- Jimmy Forrest – tenor saxophone
- Jimmy Jones – piano
- Freddie Green – guitar
- Joe Benjamin – bass
- Charlie Persip – drums
