= Coleman Hawkins and Confrères =

1958 studio album by Coleman Hawkins

Studio album by Coleman Hawkins
- Released: 1958
- Recorded: October 16, 1957, and February 7, 1958
- Studios: Los Angeles, CA and NYC
- Genre: Jazz
- Length: 34:51
- Labels: Verve; MG V-8346 / MG VS-6110
- Producer: Norman Granz

Coleman Hawkins chronology
The Genius of Coleman Hawkins (1957)	Coleman Hawkins and Confrères (1958)	The High and Mighty Hawk (1958)

Coleman Hawkins and Confrères is an album by saxophonist Coleman Hawkins that was recorded in 1958 (with one track from 1957) and released on the Verve label. Additional tracks from both sessions were added to later CD reissues. Hawkins wrote 4 of the 5 compositions on the original LP. His composition "Hanid" is a contrafact of the 1925 popular song "Dinah"

== Reception ==
Professional ratings
Review scores
Source	Rating
AllMusic	3/5 stars
The Penguin Guide to Jazz Recordings	3/4 stars

AllMusic gave the album 3 stars.

== LP Track listing ==
All compositions by Coleman Hawkins except where noted.

1. "Maria" – 6:31
2. "Sunday" (Chester Conn, Jule Styne, Bennie Krueger, Ned Miller) – 5:19
3. "Hanid" – 4:50
4. "Honey Flower" – 8:42
5. "Nabob" – 9:29
- Recorded in Los Angeles, CA, on October 16, 1957 (track 1), and in New York City on February 7, 1958 (tracks 2–5)

== CD Track listing ==
All compositions by Coleman Hawkins except where noted.

1. "Maria" – 6:31
2. "Cocktails for Two" (Arthur Johnston, Sam Coslow) – 2:39 Additional track on CD release
3. "Sunday" (Chester Conn, Jule Styne, Bennie Krueger, Ned Miller) – 5:19
4. "Hanid" – 4:50
5. "Honey Flower" – 8:42
6. "Nabob" – 9:29
7. "Honey Flower" [Alternate Take] – 8:15 Additional track on CD release
- Recorded in Los Angeles, CA, on October 16, 1957 (track 1), and in New York City on February 7, 1958 (tracks 2–7)

== Personnel ==
- Coleman Hawkins – tenor saxophone
- Roy Eldridge – trumpet (tracks 3–7)
- Ben Webster – tenor saxophone (tracks 1 & 2)
- Hank Jones (tracks 3–7), Oscar Peterson (tracks 1 & 2) – piano
- Herb Ellis – guitar (tracks 1 & 2)
- Ray Brown (tracks 1 & 2), George Duvivier (tracks 3–7) – bass
- Mickey Sheen (tracks 3–7), Alvin Stoller (tracks 1 & 2) – drums
