= Soul Street =

Soul Street may refer to:

- Soul Street (radio station), a former XM Satellite Radio station
- Soul Street (album), a 1962 album by Jimmy Forrest
