= Burnin' (Sonny Stitt album) =

Studio album by Sonny Stitt
- Released: Early May 1960
- Recorded: August 1, 1958; Chicago
- Genre: Jazz
- Length: 37:58
- Label: Argo; 661

Sonny Stitt chronology
Sonny Stitt (1958)	Burnin' (1960)	The Hard Swing (1959)

Alternative cover
- 2009 CD reissue (twofer)

Burnin' is a live album by American saxophonist Sonny Stitt, recorded in 1958 in Chicago but not released on Argo until 1960.

Released as part of the CD by Sonny Stitt and Friends as How High the Moon on Chess GRP18172, which adds tracks with other groups led by Stitt from 1964 and 1965. It can be found on the twofer Sonny Stitt / Burnin', issued by Fresh Sounds in 2009 or on the twofer Breaking It Up (Harris Trio)/Burnin' by Jazz Beat Spain

== Track listing ==
All pieces by Sonny Stitt, unless otherwise indicated.

1. "Ko-Ko" (Charlie Parker) - 4:00
2. "A Minor Sax" - 4:08
3. "Lover Man" (Jimmy Davis, James Sherman, Roger Ramirez) - 3:52
4. "Reed and a Half" - 3:28
5. "How High the Moon" (Morgan Lewis, Nancy Hamilton) - 4:48
6. "I'll Tell You Later" - 4:24
7. "Look for the Silver Lining" (Jerome Kern, Buddy G. DeSylva) - 4:30
8. "Easy Living" (Leo Robin, Ralph Rainger) - 4:02
9. "It's Hipper Than That" - 4:46

== Personnel ==
- Sonny Stitt - alto saxophone or tenor saxophone 7 and 8
- Barry Harris - piano
- William Austin - bass
- Frank Gant - drums
