= I Only Have Eyes for You (Eddie "Lockjaw" Davis album) =

Studio album by Eddie "Lockjaw" Davis with the Paul Weedon Trio
- Released: 1962
- Recorded: November 15, 1962
- Studio: Van Gelder Studio, Englewood Cliffs, NJ
- Genre: Jazz
- Length: 32:20
- Label: Prestige; PRLP 7261
- Producer: Ozzie Cadena

Eddie "Lockjaw" Davis chronology
Goin' to the Meeting (1962)	I Only Have Eyes for You (1962)	Trackin' (1962)

I Only Have Eyes for You is an album by saxophonist Eddie "Lockjaw" Davis recorded in 1962 for the Prestige label.

== Reception ==
Professional ratings
Review scores
Source	Rating
Allmusic	3/5 stars

The AllMusic review states simply "A five piece with Don Patterson on the Hammond B-3 and Paul Weeden on guitar".

== Track listing ==
1. "I Only Have Eyes for You" (Al Dubin, Harry Warren) - 5:14
2. "Sweet and Lovely" (Gus Arnheim, Jules LeMare, Harry Tobias) - 4:34
3. "Street Lights" (Matthew Gee) - 5:29
4. "The Way You Look Tonight" (Dorothy Fields, Jerome Kern) - 6:31
5. "It's a Pity to Say Goodnight" (Billy Reid) - 4:44
6. "Time on My Hands" (Harold Adamson, Mack Gordon, Vincent Youmans) - 5:48

== Personnel ==
- Eddie "Lockjaw" Davis - tenor saxophone
- Don Patterson - organ
- Paul Weeden - guitar
- George Duvivier - bass
- Billy James - drums
