= "Sweets" for the Sweet =

Studio album by "Sweets" Edison
- Released: 1964
- Recorded: May 1964
- Studios: Hollywood, CA
- Genre: Jazz
- Length: 35:15
- Labels: Sue; STLP 1030
- Producer: Juggy Murray

Harry "Sweets" Edison chronology
Wanted to Do One Together (1962)	"Sweets" for the Sweet (1964)	Sweets for the Sweet Taste of Love (1964)

"Sweets" for the Sweet is an album by trumpeter Harry "Sweets" Edison that was recorded in 1964 and released by the Sue label.

== Critical reception ==
Professional ratings
Review scores
Source	Rating
AllMusic	2.5/5 stars
The Penguin Guide to Jazz Recordings	2/4 stars

AllMusic reviewer Ken Dryden stated "Veteran trumpeter Harry "Sweets" Edison is awash in strings on this collection of ballads ... Edison's solos, whether muted or with open horn, are enjoyable, though rather reserved due to the nature of the arrangements. ... this disc will be of minimal interest to jazz fan".

== Track listing ==
1. "What Is There to Say?" (Vernon Duke, Yip Harburg) – 2:02
2. "I Wish You Love" (Léo Chauliac, Charles Trenet, Albert Beach) – 3:08
3. "Call Me Irresponsible" (Jimmy Van Heusen, Sammy Cahn) – 2:45
4. "Willow Weep for Me" (Ann Ronell) – 2:46
5. "But Beautiful" (Van Heuson, Johnny Burke) – 3:03
6. "Blues for Christine" (Harry Edison) – 2:29
7. "On Green Dolphin Street" (Bronisław Kaper, Ned Washington) – 2:42
8. "Hello, Dolly!" (Jerry Herman) – 2:52
9. "Everything Happens to Me" (Matt Dennis, Tom Adair) – 3:20
10. "Days of Wine and Roses" (Henry Mancini, Johnny Mercer) – 2:57
11. "Carpetbaggers" (Elmer Bernstein) – 3:33
12. "Sweets for the Sweet" (Edison) – 3:38

== Personnel ==
- "Sweets" Edison – trumpet
- Don Abney, Gerald Wiggins – piano
- Leroy Vinnegar – bass
- Jackie Mills – drums
- Unidentified orchestra
