= Everything's Mellow =

Studio album by Clark Terry
- Released: 1961
- Recorded: July 21, 1961
- Studio: Van Gelder Studio, Englewood Cliffs, NJ
- Genre: Jazz
- Length: 34:45
- Label: Moodsville; MVLP 20

Clark Terry chronology
Color Changes (1960)	Everything's Mellow (1961)	Clark Terry Plays the Jazz Version of All American (1962)

Everything's Mellow is an album by trumpeter Clark Terry featuring performances recorded in 1961 and originally released on the Moodsville label.

== Reception ==
Professional ratings
Review scores
Source	Rating
Allmusic	3/5 stars

Allmusic rated the album with three stars.

== Track listing ==
1. "Out in the Cold Again" (Rube Bloom, Ted Koehler) - 4:29
2. "The Simple Waltz" (Bob Brookmeyer, Clark Terry) - 5:10
3. "This Is Always" (Mack Gordon, Harry Warren) - 4:53
4. "Lullaby" (Johannes Brahms) - 3:40
5. "Among My Souvenirs" (Edgar Leslie, Horatio Nicholls) - 4:48
6. "In the Alley" (Clark Terry) - 3:46
7. "Michelle" (Terry) - 4:33
8. "As You Desire Me" (Allie Wrubel) - 3:26

== Personnel ==
- Clark Terry - trumpet, flugelhorn
- Junior Mance - piano
- Joe Benjamin - bass
- Charlie Persip - drums
