= This One's for Basie =

Studio album by Buddy Rich
- Released: January 9, 1957
- Recorded: August 24–25, 1956
- Genre: Jazz
- Length: 40:53
- Label: Norgran
- Producer: Norman Granz

Buddy Rich chronology
Buddy Rich Sings Johnny Mercer (1956)	This One's for Basie (1957)	Buddy Rich Just Sings (1957)

Alternative cover & title
- Verve re-issue

Professional ratings
Review scores
Source	Rating
Allmusic	4.5/5 stars

This One's for Basie is a 1957 studio album by Buddy Rich and an eleven-piece orchestra, recorded in tribute to bandleader Count Basie. The album was re-issued by Verve in the 1950s and again (retitled Big Band Shout) in the 1960s (but without "Blues for Basie").

== Track listing ==
LP side A

1. "Blue and Sentimental" (Count Basie, Mack David, Jerry Livingston) – 4:49
2. "Down for Double" (Freddie Green) – 4:10
3. "Jump for Me" (Basie) – 5:45
4. "Blues for Basie" (Harry "Sweets" Edison) – 7:20

LP side B

1. "Jumpin' at the Woodside" (Basie) – 6:26
2. "Ain't It the Truth" (Basie, Buster Harding, Jack Palmer) – 3:01
3. "Shorty George" (Basie, Andy Gibson) – 5:14
4. "9:20 Special" (William Engvick, Earle Warren) – 4:34

== Personnel ==
- Pete Candoli - trumpet
- Harry "Sweets" Edison - trumpet
- Conrad Gozzo - trumpet
- Frank Rosolino - trombone
- Buddy Collette - flute, baritone saxophone, tenor saxophone
- Bob Enevoldsen - tenor saxophone, valve trombone
- Bob Cooper - tenor saxophone
- Joe Mondragon - double bass
- Bill Pitman - guitar
- Jimmy Rowles - piano
- Buddy Rich - drums
- Marty Paich - arranger
