= Color Changes =

Studio album by Clark Terry
- Released: October 1961
- Recorded: November 19, 1960; Nola Penthouse Studio, New York City
- Genre: Jazz
- Length: 41:28
- Label: Candid; CJM 8009
- Producer: Nat Hentoff

Clark Terry chronology
Tate-a-Tate (1960)	Color Changes (1961)	Everything's Mellow (1961)

Color Changes is an album by trumpeter Clark Terry featuring performances recorded in the early 60s and originally released on the Candid label.

== Reception ==
Professional ratings
Review scores
Source	Rating
Allmusic	5/5 stars
The Penguin Guide to Jazz Recordings	4/4 stars

Scott Yanow of Allmusic says, "This is one of flügelhornist Clark Terry's finest albums. Terry had complete control over the music and, rather than have the usual jam session, he utilized an octet and arrangements by Yusef Lateef, Budd Johnson, and Al Cohn. ...The material, which consists of originals by Terry, Duke Jordan, Lateef, and Bob Wilber, is both rare and fresh, and the interpretations always swing. Highly recommended". Describing it as the leader's best album, The Penguin Guide to Jazz Recordings says that the variety of tones provided by the arrangement of the various horn players is particularly striking.

== Track listing ==
All compositions by Clark Terry except as indicated

1. "Blue Waltz (La Valse Bleue)" (Bob Wilber) – 6:37
2. "Brother Terry" (Yusef Lateef) – 3:54
3. "Flutin' and Fluglin'" – 6:46
4. "No Problem" (Duke Jordan) – 5:49
5. "La Rive Gauche" – 5:28
6. "Nahstye Blues" – 6:00
7. "Chat Qui Peche (A Cat That Fishes)" – 7:32

== Personnel ==
- Clark Terry – trumpet, flugelhorn
- Yusef Lateef – tenor saxophone, flute, English horn, oboe
- Seldon Powell – tenor saxophone, flute
- Julius Watkins – French horn
- Jimmy Knepper – trombone
- Tommy Flanagan – piano
- Budd Johnson – piano (track 6)
- Joe Benjamin – bass
- Ed Shaughnessy – drums
