= The Sonny Side of Stitt =

Studio album by Sonny Stitt
- Released: 1960
- Recorded: September 21, 1959; New York City
- Genre: Jazz
- Label: Roost; RLP 2240
- Producer: Teddy Reig

Sonny Stitt chronology
Sonny Stitt Sits in with the Oscar Peterson Trio (1959)	The Sonny Side of Stitt (1960)	Sonny Stitt Blows the Blues (1959)

Professional ratings
Review scores
Source	Rating
Allmusic	3/5 stars

The Sonny Side of Stitt is an album by saxophonist Sonny Stitt recorded in 1959 and originally released on the Roost label.

== Reception ==
The Allmusic site awarded the album 3 stars.

== Track listing ==
All compositions by Sonny Stitt except as indicated

1. "Skylark" (Hoagy Carmichael, Johnny Mercer) - 2:50
2. "Don't Worry 'bout Me" (Rube Bloom, Ted Koehler) - 2:55
3. "I'll Remember April" (Gene de Paul, Patricia Johnston, Don Raye) - 3:46
4. "Day by Day" (Axel Stordahl, Paul Weston, Sammy Cahn) - 3:34
5. "Red Top" (Lionel Hampton) - 3:55
6. "Moonray" (Artie Shaw, Paul Madison, Arthur Quinser) - 3:01
7. "Old Fashioned Blues" - 4:47
8. "I Never Knew" (Earl Carroll) - 4:31
9. "Hitsburg" - 4:27

== Personnel ==
- Sonny Stitt - alto saxophone, tenor saxophone 5,8,9
- Jimmy Jones - piano
- Aaron Bell - bass
- Roy Haynes - drums
