= The Hard Swing =

Studio album by Sonny Stitt
- Released: 1959
- Recorded: February 9, 1959; New York City
- Genre: Jazz
- Label: Verve; MG V-8306

Sonny Stitt chronology
Sonny Side Up (1959)	The Hard Swing (1959)	The Saxophones of Sonny Stitt (1959)

Professional ratings
Review scores
Source	Rating
Allmusic	3/5 stars

The Hard Swing is an album by saxophonist Sonny Stitt's Quartet recorded in 1959 and released on the Verve label.

== Reception ==
The Allmusic site awarded the album 3 stars.

== Track listing ==
1. "I Got Rhythm" (George Gershwin, Ira Gershwin) - 3:07
2. "What's New?" (Bob Haggart, Johnny Burke) - 3:41
3. "Subito" - 3:57
4. "If I Had You" (Irving King, Ted Shapiro) - 4:08
5. "I'll Remember April" (Don Raye, Gene de Paul, Patricia Johnston) - 4:36
6. "Blues for Lester" - 4:24
7. "After You've Gone" (Henry Creamer, Turner Layton) - 3:47
8. "Street of Dreams" (Sam M. Lewis, Victor Young) - 2:41
9. "The Way You Look Tonight" (Dorothy Fields, Jerome Kern) - 5:03
10. "Presto" - 3:27
11. "Tune Up" (Miles Davis) - 4:07

== Personnel ==
Sonny Stitt Quartet

- Sonny Stitt - alto saxophone (on 7 tracks); tenor saxophone (on 4 tracks)
- Amos Trice - piano
- George Morrow - bass
- Lenny McBrowne - drums

Technical

- Sheldon Marks - art direction
- Norman Gollin - cover design
- Tommy Mitchell - cover photography
