= All the Gin Is Gone =

Studio album by Jimmy Forrest
- Released: 1965
- Recorded: December 10 & 12, 1959
- Studio: Hall Studios, Chicago
- Genre: Jazz
- Length: 41:06 CD reissue with additional track
- Label: Delmark; DS-404
- Producer: Robert G. Koester

Jimmy Forrest chronology
Night Train (1955)	All the Gin Is Gone (1965)	Black Forrest (1972)

All the Gin Is Gone is an album by the American jazz saxophonist Jimmy Forrest recorded in 1959 but not released by the Delmark label until 1965.

== Reception ==
Professional ratings
Review scores
Source	Rating
Allmusic	4/5 stars
The Penguin Guide to Jazz Recordings	3/4 stars

Allmusic reviewer Scott Yanow stated

"This was the first album that tenor saxophonist Jimmy Forrest made after his R&B phase ended. Particularly notable is that the set served as the recording debut of guitarist Grant Green; completing the band are pianist Harold Mabern, bassist Gene Ramey and drummer Elvin Jones. ... The music is essentially melodic and blues-based hard bop that looks toward soul-jazz. Everyone sounds in fine form".

== Track listing ==
All compositions by Jimmy Forrest except where noted

1. "All the Gin Is Gone" – 4:46
2. "Laura" (David Raksin, Johnny Mercer) – 6:41
3. "You Go to My Head" (J. Fred Coots, Haven Gillespie) – 6:31 Additional track on CD reissue
4. "Myra" – 5:30
5. "Caravan" (Juan Tizol, Duke Ellington, Irving Mills) – 9:23
6. "What's New?" (Bob Haggart, Johnny Burke) – 2:57
7. "Sunkenfoal" – 5:18

== Personnel ==
- Jimmy Forrest - tenor saxophone
- Grant Green – guitar (tracks 1, 2, 4, 5 & 7)
- Harold Mabern – piano
- Gene Ramey – bass
- Elvin Jones – drums
