= Jawbreakers (album) =

Studio album by Eddie "Lockjaw" Davis and Harry "Sweets" Edison
- Released: 1962
- Recorded: April 18, 1962; NYC
- Genre: Jazz
- Length: 41:38
- Labels: Riverside; JLP-39
- Producer: Orrin Keepnews

Eddie "Lockjaw" Davis chronology
Tough Tenor Favorites (1962)	Jawbreakers (1962)	Goin' to the Meeting (1962)

Harry "Sweets" Edison chronology
Together (1961)	Jawbreakers (1962)	Wanted to Do One Together (1962)

Jawbreakers is an album by saxophonist Eddie "Lockjaw" Davis and trumpeter Harry "Sweets" Edison recorded in 1962 and released on the Riverside label.

== Reception ==
Professional ratings
Review scores
Source	Rating
Allmusic	3/5 stars
The Penguin Guide to Jazz Recordings	3/4 stars

The Allmusic site awarded the album 3 stars with the review by Scott Yanow stating, "Harry "Sweets" Edison and Eddie "Lockjaw" Davis always made for a logical combination for both had immediately recognizable sounds and could say an awful lot with one note... Easily recommended to straightahead jazz fans as are the later Sweets-Lockjaw recordings".

== Track listing ==
All compositions by Harry "Sweets" Edison except where noted

1. "Oo-Ee!" - 5:15
2. "Broadway" (Billy Bird, Teddy McRae, Henri Woode) - 5:20
3. "Jawbreakers" - 6:36
4. "Four" (Eddie "Cleanhead" Vinson) - 3:36
5. "Moolah" - 4:39
6. "A Gal in Calico" (Leo Robin, Arthur Schwartz) - 4:43
7. "I've Got a Crush on You" (George Gershwin, Ira Gershwin) - 5:55
8. "Close Your Eyes" (Bernice Petkere) - 5:34

== Personnel ==
- Eddie "Lockjaw" Davis - tenor saxophone
- Harry "Sweets" Edison - trumpet
- Hugh Lawson - piano
- Ike Isaacs - bass
- Clarence Johnston - drums
