= Buddy Rich Sings Johnny Mercer =

Studio album by Buddy Rich
- Released: 1956
- Recorded: January 4–6, 1956
- Genre: Vocal jazz
- Length: 40:53
- Label: Verve
- Producer: Norman Granz

Buddy Rich chronology
The Lionel Hampton Art Tatum Buddy Rich Trio (1956)	Buddy Rich Sings Johnny Mercer (1956)	This One's for Basie (1956)

Professional ratings
Review scores
Source	Rating
Allmusic	4.5/5 stars

Buddy Rich Sings Johnny Mercer is a 1956 studio album by Buddy Rich, of the lyrics of Johnny Mercer, arranged by Buddy Bregman. This was the first of three vocal albums that Rich recorded.

== Track listing ==
LP side A

1. "Goody Goody" (Matty Malneck)
2. "Out of This World" (Harold Arlen)
3. "Skylark" (Hoagy Carmichael)
4. "Ac-Cent-Tchu-Ate the Positive" (Arlen)
5. "One for My Baby (and One More for the Road)" (Arlen)
6. "Fools Rush In (Where Angels Fear to Tread)" (Bloom)

LP side B

1. "Day In, Day Out" (Rube Bloom)
2. "Blues in the Night" (Arlen)
3. "Trav'lin' Light" (Jimmy Mundy, Trummy Young)
4. "Too Marvelous for Words" (Richard A. Whiting)
5. "This Time the Dream's on Me" (Arlen)
6. "Dream" (Johnny Mercer)

All lyrics by Johnny Mercer, composers indicated.

== Personnel ==
- Harry "Sweets" Edison – trumpet
- Ted Nash – tenor saxophone
- Jimmy Rowles – piano
- Buddy Rich – vocals, drums
- Alvin Stoller – drums
- Buddy Bregman – arranger, orchestra conductor
