= Side by Side (Duke Ellington and Johnny Hodges album) =

1959 Duke Ellington and Johnny Hodges album

Studio album by Duke Ellington and Johnny Hodges
- Released: 1959
- Recorded: August 14, 1958 – Nola Studios, New York City February 20, 1959 -Columbia Studios, New York
- Genre: Jazz
- Length: 45:45
- Label: Verve
- Producer: Norman Granz

Duke Ellington chronology
Back to Back: Duke Ellington and Johnny Hodges Play the Blues (1959)	Side by Side (1959)	Anatomy of a Murder (1959)

Professional ratings
Review scores
Source	Rating
AllMusic	4/5 stars
DownBeat	4/5 stars
The Encyclopedia of Popular Music	5/5 stars
Tom Hull	A
The Penguin Guide to Jazz Recordings	4/4 stars

Although it is billed as a Duke Ellington and Johnny Hodges album, Side by Side is a 1959 album mostly under the leadership of Johnny Hodges, Duke Ellington's alto saxophonist for many years. Ellington only appears on three of this album's tracks. The album places Hodges at the fore, backing him with piano by Ellington or Billy Strayhorn and providing other accompaniment by jazz figures like Ben Webster, Roy Eldridge, Harry "Sweets" Edison and Jo Jones. The album, a follow-up to Back to Back: Duke Ellington and Johnny Hodges Play the Blues, has remained perpetually in print.

== Track listing ==
1. "Stompy Jones" (Duke Ellington) – 6:38
2. "Squeeze Me" (Fats Waller, Clarence Williams) – 4:36
3. "Big Shoe" (Jimmy Hamilton) – 5:37
4. "Going Up" (D. Ellington) – 4:51
5. "Just a Memory" (Ray Henderson, Lew Brown, Buddy DeSylva) – 5:53
6. "Let's Fall in Love" (Harold Arlen, Ted Koehler) – 6:47
7. "Ruint" (Mercer Ellington, Johnny Hodges) – 2:32
8. "Bend One" (Hodges) – 2:59
9. "You Need to Rock" (Hodges) – 5:52

== Personnel ==
=== Tracks 1, 2 and 4 ===
- Duke Ellington – piano
- Johnny Hodges – alto saxophone
- Harry "Sweets" Edison – trumpet
- Les Spann – flute (track 4 only), guitar
- Al Hall – bass
- Jo Jones – drums

These tracks were recorded February 26, 1959

=== Tracks 3 and 5 through 9 ===
- Johnny Hodges – alto saxophone
- Roy Eldridge – trumpet
- Lawrence Brown – trombone
- Ben Webster – tenor saxophone
- Billy Strayhorn – piano
- Wendell Marshall – bass
- Jo Jones – drums

These tracks were recorded August 14, 1958

Nat Hentoff – liner notes

== Charts ==
Chart performance for Side by Side
Chart (2025)	Peak position
Greek Albums (IFPI)	94
