= Tough Tenors Again 'n' Again =

Studio album by The Eddie "Lockjaw" Davis and Johnny Griffin Quintet
- Released: 1970
- Recorded: April 24, 1970; Cornet Studios, Cologne, West Germany
- Genre: Jazz
- Label: MPS; MPS-15283
- Producer: Gigi Campi

Eddie "Lockjaw" Davis chronology
Love Calls (1968)	Tough Tenors Again 'n' Again (1970)	The Tenor Giants Featuring Oscar Peterson (1975)

Johnny Griffin chronology
Lady Heavy Bottom's Waltz (1968)	Tough Tenors Again 'n' Again (1970)	Blues for Harvey (1973)

Tough Tenors Again 'n' Again is an album by saxophonists Eddie "Lockjaw" Davis and Johnny Griffin recorded in West Germany in 1970 and released on the MPS label.

== Reception ==
Professional ratings
Review scores
Source	Rating
Allmusic	4/5 stars
The Rolling Stone Jazz Record Guide	3/5 stars

The Allmusic site awarded the album 4 stars stating, "There is no less fire in this reunion, and Boland's arrangements bring out the best in both tenor saxophonists"

== Track listing ==
All compositions by Edie "Lockjaw" Davis except as indicated

1. "Again 'n' Again" (Eddie "Lockjaw" Davis, Johnny Griffin) - 3:29
2. "Tin Tin Deo" (Gil Fuller, Chano Pozo) - 10:06
3. "If I Had You" (Irving King, Ted Shapiro) - 4:20
4. "Jim Dawg" - 8:15
5. "When We Were One" (Griffin) - 7:47
6. "Gigi" - 5:58

== Personnel ==
- Eddie "Lockjaw" Davis, Johnny Griffin - tenor saxophone
- Francy Boland - piano
- Jimmy Woode - bass
- Kenny Clarke - drums
