= Blues for Harvey =

Live album by Johnny Griffin
- Released: 1973
- Recorded: July 4–5, 1973
- Venue: Jazzhus Montmartre in Copenhagen, Denmark
- Genre: Jazz
- Length: 55:53
- Label: SteepleChase; SCS-1004
- Producer: Nils Winther

Johnny Griffin chronology
Tough Tenors Again 'n' Again (1970)	Blues for Harvey (1973)	Live at Music Inn (1974)

Blues for Harvey is an album by American saxophonist Johnny Griffin recorded at the Jazzhus Montmartre in 1973 and released on the SteepleChase label.

== Reception ==
Professional ratings
Review scores
Source	Rating
AllMusic	3/5 stars
The Penguin Guide to Jazz Recordings	3/4 stars

The AllMusic review by Ken Dryden states, "There are some exciting moments, but overall, this live record falls just a bit short of essential for hard bop fans."

== Track listing ==
All compositions by Johnny Griffin except where noted.

1. "That Party Upstairs" - 14:42
2. "Alone Again" - 8:42
3. "Sound Track Blues" - 6:13 Bonus track on CD reissue
4. "The Theme" (Traditional) - 0:26 Bonus track on CD reissue
5. "Soft and Furry" - 11:34
6. "Blues for Harvey" - 12:53
7. "Rhythm-a-Ning/The Theme" (Thelonious Monk/Traditional) - 2:36

== Personnel ==
- Johnny Griffin – tenor saxophone
- Kenny Drew – piano
- Mads Vinding – bass
- Ed Thigpen – drums
