= Love Calls =

Studio album by Eddie "Lockjaw" Davis with Paul Gonsalves
- Released: 1968
- Recorded: 1968
- Genre: Jazz
- Label: RCA Victor; LSP 3882
- Producer: Brad McCuen

Eddie "Lockjaw" Davis chronology
The Fox & the Hounds (1967)	Love Calls (1968)	Tough Tenors Again 'n' Again (1970)

Love Calls is an album by saxophonist Eddie "Lockjaw" Davis with Paul Gonsalves recorded in 1968 for the RCA Victor label.

== Reception ==
Professional ratings
Review scores
Source	Rating
Allmusic	3/5 stars

Allmusic awarded the album three stars and Ron Wynn states, "Paul Gonsalves (ts) matches fours and spirit with Davis".

== Track listing ==
1. "Love Is Here to Stay" (George Gershwin, Ira Gershwin) -
2. "When Sunny Gets Blue" (Jack Segal, Marvin Fisher) -
3. "If I Ruled The World" (Leslie Bricusse, Cyril Ornadel) -
4. "Time After Time" (Sammy Cahn, Jule Styne) -
5. "Just Friends" (John Klenner, Sam M. Lewis) -
6. "Don't Blame Me" (Dorothy Fields, Jimmy McHugh) -
7. "I Should Care" (Axel Stordahl, Paul Weston, Sammy Cahn) -
8. "The Man With A Horn" (Eddie DeLange, Jack Jenney, Bonnie Lake) -
9. "We'll Be Together Again" (Carl T. Fischer, Frankie Laine) -
10. "A Weaver Of Dreams" (Victor Young, Jack Elliott) -
11. "If I Should Lose You" (Ralph Rainger, Leo Robin) -

== Personnel ==
- Eddie "Lockjaw" Davis, Paul Gonsalves - tenor saxophone
- Roland Hanna - piano
- Ben Tucker - bass
- Grady Tate - drums
