= Guitar Forms =

Studio album by Kenny Burrell
- Released: 1965
- Recorded: December 4, 15, 1964, Webster Hall, New York City, New York, April 6, 12, 1965, Van Gelder Studio, Englewood Cliffs, New Jersey
- Genre: Jazz
- Length: 38:31
- Label: Verve
- Producer: Creed Taylor

Kenny Burrell chronology
Freedom (1963-64)	Guitar Forms (1965)	The Tender Gender (1965)

Professional ratings
Review scores
Source	Rating
Allmusic	4/5 stars
Record Mirror	4/5 stars
The Penguin Guide to Jazz Recordings	3.5/4 stars
DownBeat	5/5 stars
The Rolling Stone Jazz Record Guide	5/5 stars

Guitar Forms is a 1965 album by Kenny Burrell, featuring arrangements by Gil Evans. Evans' orchestra appears on five of the album's nine tracks, including the nearly 10-minute "Lotus Land". Three tracks are blues numbers in a small group format, and there is one solo performance: "Prelude #2".

== Reception ==
In 1966, the album was nominated for the Grammy Award for Best Instrumental Jazz Performance – Large Group or Soloist with Large Group, for Best Album Cover – Photography, and Gil Evans was nominated for Best Arrangement Accompanying a Vocalist or Instrumentalist for "Greensleeves".

== Track listing ==
1. "Downstairs" (Elvin Jones) – 2:53
2. "Lotus Land" (Cyril Scott) – 9:38
3. "Terrace Theme" (Joe Benjamin) – 4:02
4. "Prelude No. 2" (George Gershwin) – 2:17
5. "Moon and Sand" (William Engvick, Morty Palitz, Alec Wilder) – 4:16
6. "Loie" (Kenny Burrell) – 3:19
7. "Greensleeves" (Traditional) – 4:12
8. "Last Night When We Were Young" (Harold Arlen, Yip Harburg) – 4:34
9. "Breadwinner" (Burrell) – 3:00
  Alternative tracks included on the Verve Jazz Masters reissue:
10. "Downstairs" – 4:11
11. "Downstairs" – 3:06
12. "Downstairs" – 2:38
13. "Downstairs" – 2:36
14. "Terrace Theme" – 2:59
15. "Terrace Theme" – 3:58
16. "Terrace Theme" – 4:09
17. "Breadwinner" – 3:51
18. "Breadwinner" – 3:49
19. "Breadwinner" – 3:17
20. "Breadwinner" – 3:04

== Personnel ==
=== Combo ===
- Kenny Burrell - guitar
- Roger Kellaway - piano
- Joe Benjamin - double bass
- Grady Tate - drums
- Willie Rodriguez - conga

=== Orchestra ===
- Gil Evans - arranged & conducted
- Kenny Burrell - guitar
- Johnny Coles or Louis Mucci - trumpet
- Jimmy Cleveland & Jimmy Knepper - trombone
- Andy Fitzgerald - flute & English horn
- Ray Beckenstein - alto flute, flute & bass clarinet
- George Marge - English horn & flute or Richie Kamuca - tenor sax & oboe
- Lee Konitz - alto saxophone
- Steve Lacy - soprano saxophone
- Bob Tricarico - tenor sax, bassoon & flute
- Ray Alonge or Julius Watkins - french horn
- Bill Barber - tuba
- Ron Carter - double bass
- Elvin Jones, José Mangual Sr., & Charlie Persip - drums & percussion

=== Production ===
- Creed Taylor – producer
- Rudy Van Gelder – engineer

== Charts ==
Chart performance for Guitar Forms
Chart (2024)	Peak position
Croatian International Albums (HDU)	30
