= Mr. Swing (album) =

Studio album by Harry Edison
- Released: 1960
- Recorded: September 18, 1958
- Studio: New York City, NY
- Genre: Jazz
- Length: 39:23
- Label: Verve; MG V-8353
- Producer: Norman Granz

Harry Edison chronology
The Swinger (1958)	Mr. Swing (1960)	Harry Edison Swings Buck Clayton (1958)

Mr. Swing is an album by trumpeter Harry Edison which was recorded in 1958 at the same session that produced The Swinger and released on the Verve label in 1960.

Professional ratings
Review scores
Source	Rating
Allmusic	3/5 stars

== Track listing ==
All compositions by Harry Edison except where noted.

1. "Love Is Here to Stay" (George Gershwin, Ira Gershwin) – 9:52
2. "Short Coat" – 9:46
3. "Baby, Won't You Please Come Home" (Charles Warfield, Clarence Williams) – 5:10
4. "Impresario" – 8:42
5. "Ill Wind" (Harold Arlen, Ted Koehler) – 5:53

== Personnel ==
- Harry Edison – trumpet
- Jimmy Forrest – tenor saxophone
- Jimmy Jones – piano
- Freddie Green – guitar
- Joe Benjamin – bass
- Charlie Persip – drums
