= A Little Bit of Stitt =

Studio album by Sonny Stitt
- Released: 1959
- Recorded: April 10, 1959
- Studio: Nola's Penthouse Sound, New York City
- Genre: Jazz
- Label: Roost; RLP 2235
- Producer: Teddy Reig

Sonny Stitt chronology
Sonny Stitt Plays Jimmy Giuffre Arrangements (1959)	A Little Bit of Stitt (1959)	Sonny Stitt Sits in with the Oscar Peterson Trio (1959)

Professional ratings
Review scores
Source	Rating
Allmusic	3/5 stars
DownBeat	2.5/5 stars

A Little Bit of Stitt is an album by saxophonist Sonny Stitt recorded in 1959 and originally released on the Roost label.

== Track listing ==
All compositions by Sonny Stitt except as indicated

1. "When the Red, Red Robin (Comes Bob, Bob, Bobbin' Along)" (Harry M. Woods) – 2:48
2. "For All We Know" (Sam M. Lewis, J. Fred Coots) – 3:06
3. "I'm Confessin' (That I Love You)" (Doc Daugherty, Ellis Reynolds, Al J. Neiburg) – 3:19
4. "Cocktails for Two" (Arthur Johnston, Sam Coslow) – 3:38
5. "Star Eyes" (Gene de Paul, Don Raye) – 3:39
6. "On a Slow Boat to China" (Frank Loesser) – 3:21
7. "Laura" (David Raksin, Johnny Mercer) – 3:18
8. "J. B. Blues" – 3:56
9. "Don't Take Your Love from Me" (Henry Nemo) – 2:55
10. "After The Late, Late Show" – 3:56

== Personnel ==
- Sonny Stitt – alto saxophone, tenor saxophone (tracks 3,6,8)
- Jimmy Jones – piano
- Aaron Bell – bass
- Charlie Persip – drums
