= Sweets for the Sweet Taste of Love =

Studio album by Harry "Sweets" Edison
- Released: 1964
- Recorded: August 1964
- Studio: Los Angeles
- Genre: Jazz
- Length: 37:15
- Label: Vee-Jay; LPS-1104
- Producer: Lee Young

Harry "Sweets" Edison chronology
"Sweets" for the Sweet (1964)	Sweets for the Sweet Taste of Love (1964)	When Lights are Low (1966)

Sweets for the Sweet Taste of Love is an album by jazz trumpeter Harry "Sweets" Edison with recorded in California in 1964 and released by the Vee-Jay label.

Professional ratings
Review scores
Source	Rating
AllMusic	3/5 stars

== Track listing ==
1. "Dream" (Johnny Mercer) – 3:10
2. "Isn't It Romantic?" (Richard Rodgers, Lorenz Hart) – 2:31
3. "When Your Lover Has Gone" (Einar Aaron Swan) – 3:17
4. "Nice 'n' Easy" (Alan Bergman, Marilyn Keith, Lew Spence) – 2:38
5. "My Old Flame" (Arthur Johnston, Sam Coslow) – 3:21
6. "Don't Know What Kind of Blues I've Got" (Duke Ellington) – 3:04
7. "I'm Lost" (Otis René) – 4:16
8. "The Girl from Ipanema" (Antônio Carlos Jobim, Vinicius de Moraes, Norman Gimbel) – 3:06
9. "You're Blasé" (Ord Hamilton, Bruce Sievier) – 2:59
10. "Blues in My Heart" (Benny Carter, Irving Mills) – 3:41
11. "I Hadn't Anyone Till You" (Ray Noble) – 2:48
12. "Honeysuckle Rose" (Fats Waller, Andy Razaf) – 3:21

== Personnel ==
- Harry "Sweets" Edison – trumpet
- Orchestra conducted by Benny Carter featuring:
  - Gerald Wiggins – piano
  - John Collins – guitar
  - Joe Comfort – bass
  - Earl Palmer – drums
  - Additional unidentified musicians – trombones, violins, harp and vocal group
- Benny Carter (tracks 6–8), Dick Hazard (tracks 1, 2, 4, 9–10 && 12), Warren Baker (tracks 3, 5 & 11) – arrangement
