= Clark Terry Plays the Jazz Version of All American =

Studio album by Clark Terry
- Released: 1962
- Recorded: May 11 & 15, 1962
- Studio: Van Gelder Studio, Englewood Cliffs, New Jersey
- Genre: Jazz
- Length: 32:12
- Label: Moodsville; MVLP 26

Clark Terry chronology
Everything's Mellow (1961)	Clark Terry Plays the Jazz Version of All American (1962)	Back in Bean's Bag (1962)

Clark Terry Plays the Jazz Version of All American is an album by trumpeter Clark Terry featuring performances of music from the Broadway musical, All American recorded in 1962 and originally released on the Moodsville label.

== Reception ==
Professional ratings
Review scores
Source	Rating
Allmusic	3/5 stars

Allmusic rated the album with three stars.

== Track listing ==
All compositions by Lee Adams and Charles Strouse

1. "What a Country" - 4:22
2. "Same Language" - 4:05
3. "If I Were You" - 5:00
4. "I've Just Seen Her" - 3:50
5. "Once upon a Time" - 2:20
6. "Nightlife" - 4:34
7. "It's Fun to Think" - 5:06
8. "The Fight Song" - 3:45

== Personnel ==
- Clark Terry - trumpet, flugelhorn
- Lester Robinson - trombone
- Budd Johnson - tenor saxophone
- George Barrow - baritone saxophone
- Eddie Costa - piano, vibraphone
- Art Davis - bass
- Ed Shaughnessy - drums
- Oliver Nelson - arranger
