= Lock, the Fox =

Studio album by Eddie "Lockjaw" Davis
- Released: 1966
- Recorded: 21 june 1966
- Genre: Jazz
- Label: RCA Victor; LSP 3652
- Producer: Brad McCuen

Eddie "Lockjaw" Davis chronology
Trackin' (1962)	Lock, the Fox (1966)	The Fox & the Hounds (1967)

Professional ratings
Review scores
Source	Rating
Allmusic	3/5 stars

Lock, the Fox is an album by saxophonist Eddie "Lockjaw" Davis recorded in 1966 for the RCA Victor label.

== Reception ==
The Allmusic site awarded the album 3 stars.

== Track listing ==
1. "Nina Never Knew" (Louis Alter, Milton Drake) - 2:34
2. "Speak Low" (Ogden Nash Kurt Weill) - 4:01
3. "Midnight Sun" (Sonny Burke, Lionel Hampton, Johnny Mercer) - 3:50
4. "On Green Dolphin Street" (Bronisław Kaper, Ned Washington) - 3:42
5. "Save Your Love for Me" (Buddy Johnson) - 3:11
6. "On a Clear Day (You Can See Forever)" (Burton Lane, Alan Jay Lerner) - 3:23
7. "West Coast Blues" (Wes Montgomery) - 4:06
8. "Days of Wine and Roses" (Henry Mancini, Johnny Mercer) - 3:21
9. "The Good Life" (Sacha Distel) - 3:39
10. "Oh!! Gee!!" (Matthew Gee) - 3:03

== Personnel ==
- Eddie "Lockjaw" Davis - tenor saxophone
- Ross Tompkins - piano
- Les Spann - guitar
- Russell George - bass
- Chuck Lampkin - drums
- Ray Barretto - congas
