= Harry Edison Swings Buck Clayton =

Studio album by Harry Edison and Buck Clayton
- Released: 1958
- Recorded: October 16, 1958
- Studio: Nola Studios, NYC
- Genre: Jazz
- Label: Verve; MG V-8293

Harry Edison chronology
Mr. Swing (1958)	Harry Edison Swings Buck Clayton (1958)	Sweetenings (1958)

Buck Clayton chronology
Duke Ellington and the Buck Clayton All-Stars at Newport (1956)	Harry Edison Swings Buck Clayton (1958)	Songs for Swingers (1958)

Harry Edison Swings Buck Clayton, subtitled (And Vice Versa), is an album by trumpeters Harry Edison, and Buck Clayton which was recorded in 1958 and released on the Verve label.

Professional ratings
Review scores
Source	Rating
AllMusic	3/5 stars

== Track listing ==
All compositions by Harry Edison except where noted.

1. "Memories for the Count" – 8:51
2. "Come With Me" – 5:51
3. "Critic's Delight" – 6:48
4. "Oh How I Hate to Get Up in the Morning" – 9:06
5. "Medley: It All Depends On You/Charmaine/How Long Has This Been Going On?/Makin' Whoopee" (Ray Henderson, Buddy DeSylva, Lew Brown/Ernö Rapée, Lew Pollack/George Gershwin, Ira Gershwin/Walter Donaldson, Gus Kahn) – 8:54

== Personnel ==
- Harry Edison, Buck Clayton – trumpet
- Jimmy Forrest – tenor saxophone
- Eddie Costa – vibraphone
- Jimmy Jones – piano
- Freddie Green – guitar
- Joe Benjamin – bass
- Charlie Persip – drums
