= Most Much! =

Studio album by Jimmy Forrest
- Released: 1961
- Recorded: October 19, 1961
- Studios: Van Gelder Studio, Englewood Cliffs, New Jersey
- Genre: Jazz
- Length: 49:09
- Labels: Prestige; PRLP 7218
- Producer: Esmond Edwards

Jimmy Forrest chronology
| Sit Down and Relax with Jimmy Forrest (1961) | Most Much! (1961) | Soul Street (1962) |

Most Much! is an album by saxophonist Jimmy Forrest recorded in 1961 and released on the Prestige label.

== Reception ==
Professional ratings
Review scores
| Source | Rating |
|---|---|
| AllMusic | 4.5/5 stars |
| Down Beat | (Original Lp release) |
| The Penguin Guide to Jazz Recordings | 3/4 stars |

Scott Yanow of AllMusic states, "Jimmy Forrest was a very consistent tenor, able to infuse bop and swing standards with soul and his distinctive tone... Enjoyable music from the warm tenor".

== Track listing ==
All compositions by Jimmy Forrest except where noted.

1. "Matilda" (Norman Span) – 4:50
2. "Annie Laurie" (Traditional) – 7:46
3. "Autumn Leaves" (Joseph Kosma, Johnny Mercer, Jacques Prévert) – 4:28
4. "My Buddy" (Walter Donaldson, Gus Kahn) – 2:44
5. "I Love You" (Harry Archer, Harlan Thompson) – 5:16 Bonus track on CD reissue
6. "Soft Winds" (Benny Goodman) – 5:40
7. "Robbin's Nest" (Illinois Jacquet, Bob Russell, Sir Charles Thompson) – 8:51
8. "Most Much" – 6:41
9. "Sonny Boy" (Lew Brown, Buddy DeSylva, Ray Henderson) – 3:19 Bonus track on CD reissue

== Personnel ==
- Jimmy Forrest – tenor saxophone
- Hugh Lawson – piano
- Tommy Potter – bass
- Clarence Johnston – drums
- Ray Barretto – congas
- Esmond Edwards – supervisor
- Rudy Van Gelder – engineer
