= Charlie Persip =

American jazz musician (1929–2020)

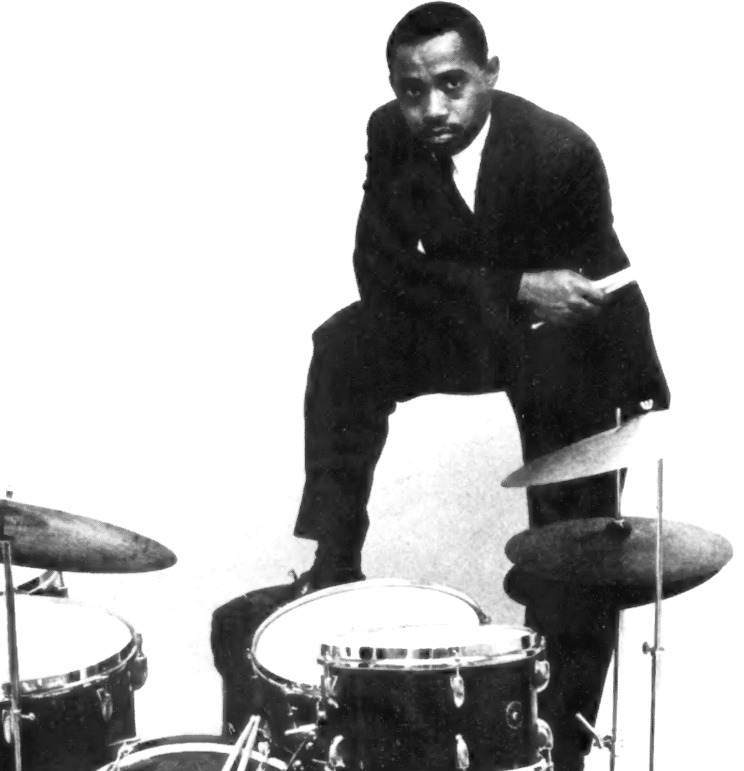

Background information
- Also known as: Charli Persip
- Born: Charles Lawrence Persip; July 26, 1929; Morristown, New Jersey, U.S.
- Died: August 23, 2020 (aged 91) New York City
- Genres: R&B, jazz fusion, jazz
- Occupation: Drummer
- Instrument: Drums
- Years active: 1945–2010
- Website: Charlie Persip discography at Discogs

Charles Lawrence Persip (July 26, 1929 – August 23, 2020), known as Charli Persip and formerly as Charlie Persip (he changed the spelling of his name to Charli in the late 1960s), was an American jazz drummer.

== Biography ==
Born in Morristown, New Jersey, United States, and raised in Newark, New Jersey, Persip attended West Side High School, preferring it over Newark Arts High School because he wanted to join the former's football team. He later studied drums with Al Germansky in Newark. After playing with Tadd Dameron in 1953, he gained recognition as a jazz drummer as he toured and recorded with Dizzy Gillespie's big and small bands between 1953 and 1958. He then joined Harry "Sweets" Edison's quintet and later the Harry James Orchestra before forming his own group, the Jazz Statesmen, with Roland Alexander, Freddie Hubbard, and Ron Carter in 1960. Around this time, Persip also recorded with other jazz musicians, including Lee Morgan, Melba Liston, Kenny Dorham, Zoot Sims, Red Garland, Gil Evans, Don Ellis, Eric Dolphy, Rahsaan Roland Kirk, Gene Ammons and the singer Dinah Washington. Persip was also the drummer on the "Eternal Triangle" recording, Sonny Side Up (Verve, 1957), featuring Sonny Rollins and Sonny Stitt. From 1960 to 1973 he toured as a drummer and conductor with Billy Eckstine.

Along with his performing activities, Persip earned a reputation as an educator. From 1974, he was an instructor of drums and music for Jazzmobile, Inc. in New York City. As of 2008, he was an associate professor at the New School for Jazz and Contemporary Music in Manhattan.

Persip led Supersound, his jazz big band that was started in the mid-1980s as Superband. Supersound's first album was recorded on the Stash label, and was titled Charli Persip and Superband. The group's second album, Superband II, and third album, No Dummies Allowed, were recorded on the Soul Note label. Their fourth album was Intrinsic Evolution.

== Death ==
Charli Persip died August 23, 2020, at Mount Sinai Morningside in New York City at the age of 91.

== Discography ==
=== As leader ===
- Gretsch Drum Night at Birdland with Art Blakey, Elvin Jones, Philly Joe Jones (Roulette, 1960)
- Gretsch Drum Night at Birdland Vol. 2 with Art Blakey, Elvin Jones, Philly Joe Jones (Roulette, 1961)
- Charles Persip and the Jazz Statesmen (Bethlehem, 1961)
- Drum Night at Birdland with Art Blakey, Elvin Jones, Philly Joe Jones (Roulette, 1974)
- Charlie Persip and Gerry Lafurn's 17-Piece Superband (Stash, 1981)
- In Case You Missed It (Soul Note, 1985)
- No Dummies Allowed (Soul Note, 1989)
- Charli Persip & Supersound - Intrinsic Evolution (2008 Charles Persip Productions & Cancrizans Booking & Management)

=== As sideman ===
With Ernestine Anderson

- Moanin' Moanin' Moanin' (Mercury, 1960)
- My Kinda Swing (Mercury, 1960)

With Bob Brookmeyer

- Stretching Out (United Artists, 1958) with Zoot Sims
- Portrait of the Artist (Atlantic, 1960)
- Jazz Is a Kick (Mercury, 1960)

With Cándido Camero

- In Indigo (ABC-Paramount, 1958)
- Latin Fire (ABC-Paramount, 1959)
- Conga Soul (Roulette, 1962)

With Harry Edison

- The Swinger (Verve, 1958)
- Mr. Swing (Verve, 1958)
- Harry Edison Swings Buck Clayton (Verve, 1958)
- Sweetenings (Roulette, 1959)

With Don Ellis

- How Time Passes (Candid, 1961)
- New Ideas (New Jazz, 1961)

With Art Farmer

- The Aztec Suite (United Artists, 1959)
- Listen to Art Farmer and the Orchestra (Mercury, 1963)

With Frank Foster

- Bursting Out! (Denon, 1978)
- Shiny Stockings (Denon, 1979)
- Twelve Shades of Black (Leo, 1979)

With Dizzy Gillespie

- More of the Dizzy Gillespie Stan Getz Sextet (Norgran, 1954)
- Afro (Norgran, 1954)
- Jazz Recital (Norgran, 1955)
- Dizzy and Strings (Norgran, 1955)
- World Statesman (Norgran, 1956)
- Diz and Getz (Verve, 1957)
- Dizzy Gillespie at Newport (Verve, 1957)
- Dizzy Gillespie's Big Band Jazz (American Recording Society, 1957)
- Duets (Verve, 1958)
- Birks' Works (Verve, 1958)
- Dizzy in Greece (Verve, 1958)
- The Greatest Trumpet of Them All (Verve, 1959)
- Sonny Side Up with Sonny Stitt, Sonny Rollins (Verve, 1959)
- A Portrait of Duke Ellington (Verve, 1960)
- Perceptions (Verve, 1961)

With Red Garland

- Bright and Breezy (Jazzland, 1961)
- Rojo (Prestige, 1961)
- When There Are Grey Skies (Prestige, 1962)
- Soul Burnin' (Prestige, 1964)

With Benny Golson

- Benny Golson's New York Scene (Contemporary, 1958)
- Pop + Jazz = Swing (Audio Fidelity, 1962; reissued as Just Jazz!, Audio Fidelity, 1965)

With Quincy Jones

- This Is How I Feel About Jazz (ABC-Paramount, 1957)

With Rahsaan Roland Kirk

- We Free Kings (Mercury, 1962)
- The Return of the 5000 Lb. Man (Warner Bros., 1976)
- Kirkatron (Warner Bros., 1977)

With Hank Mobley

- Newark 1953 (Uptown Records, 2012)
- Hank Mobley Sextet (Blue Note, 1957)
- Peckin' Time (Blue Note, 1959)

With Lee Morgan

- Lee Morgan Sextet (Blue Note, 1957)
- Dizzy Atmosphere (Specialty, 1957) with Al Grey and Billy Mitchell
- Lee Morgan Vol. 3 (Blue Note, 1957)

With David "Fathead" Newman

- Straight Ahead (Atlantic, 1961)
- Fathead Comes On (Atlantic, 1962)

With Joe Newman

- Soft Swingin' Jazz (Coral, 1958)
- Joe Newman with Woodwinds (Roulette, 1958)

With Cecil Payne

- Performing Charlie Parker Music (1961)
- The Connection (1962)

With Jerome Richardson

- Roamin' with Richardson (New Jazz, 1959)
- Midnight Oil (New Jazz, 1961)

With George Russell

- New York, N.Y. (Decca, 1959)
- Jazz in the Space Age (Decca, 1960)

With Sonny Stitt

- The Saxophones of Sonny Stitt (Roost, 1958)
- A Little Bit of Stitt (Roost, 1959)
- Soul Summit with Gene Ammons and Jack McDuff (Prestige, 1962)

With Randy Weston

- Little Niles (United Artists, 1959)
- Uhuru Afrika (Roulette, 1961)
- Highlife (Colpix, 1963)
- Volcano Blues (Verve, 1993) with Melba Liston

With George Williams

- Swing Classics in Hi-Fi (United Artists, 1959)
- Put on Your Dancing Shoes (United Artists, 1960)

With others

- Cannonball Adderley, African Waltz (Riverside, 1961)
- Joe Albany, Portrait of an Artist (Elektra/Musician, 1982)
- Don Bagley, Jazz on the Rocks (Regent 1959)
- Bill Barron, West Side Story Bossa Nova (Audio Fidelity, 1969)
- Aaron Bell, Richard Rodgers' Victory at Sea (Jazz Lion 1959)
- George Benson, Benson Burner (Columbia, 1976)
- Cindy Lee Berryhill, Naked Movie Star (Rhino, 1989)
- Kenny Burrell, Guitar Forms (Verve, 1965)
- Donald Byrd, House of Byrd (Prestige, 1976)
- Ron Carter, Where? (New Jazz, 1962)
- Eddie Chamblee, Chamblee Music (EmArcy, 1958)
- Ray Charles, The Genius of Ray Charles (Atlantic, 1959)
- Jimmy Cleveland, Cleveland Style (EmArcy, 1958)
- Al Cohn, Son of Drum Suite (RCA Victor, 1961)
- Johnny Coles, The Warm Sound (Epic, 1961)
- Albert Dailey, Renaissance (Catalyst, 1977)
- Kenny Dorham, This Is the Moment! (Riverside, 1958)
- Buddy Emmons, Steel Guitar Jazz (Mercury, 1963)
- Gil Evans, Out of the Cool (Impulse!, 1961)
- Curtis Fuller, The Curtis Fuller Jazztet (Savoy, 1959)
- Erroll Garner, Feeling Is Believing (Mercury, 1970)
- Charles Greenlee, I Know About the Life (Baystate 1977)
- Johnny Griffin, The Big Soul-Band (Riverside, 1960)
- Lionel Hampton, Hamp's Big Band (Audio Fidelity, 1959)
- Slide Hampton, Slide Hampton and His Horn of Plenty (Strand, 1959)
- Craig Harris, Black Bone (Soul Note, 1984)
- Milt Jackson, For Someone I Love (Riverside, 1963)
- Harry James, Harry James and His New Swingin' Band (MGM 1959)
- Budd Johnson, Let's Swing! (Swingville, 1960)
- Etta Jones, So Warm (Prestige, 1961)
- Louis Jordan, Somebody Up There Digs Me (Mercury/Wing, 1962)
- Taft Jordan, Mood Indigo!!! Taft Jordan Plays Duke Ellington (Moodsville, 1961)
- Irene Kral, SteveIreneo! (United Artists, 1959)
- Melba Liston, Melba Liston and Her 'Bones (MetroJazz, 1959)
- Pat Martino, Baiyina (The Clear Evidence) (Prestige, 1968)
- Ken McIntyre, A New Beginning (Passin' Thru, 2001)
- Hal McKusick, Triple Exposure (Prestige, 1957)
- Blue Mitchell, Smooth as the Wind (Riverside, 1961)
- Oliver Nelson, Joe Newman, Main Stem (Prestige, 1962)
- Mary Osborne, Now and Then (Stash, 1982)
- Sonny Phillips, I Concentrate on You (Muse, 1979)
- Pony Poindexter, Pony's Express (Epic, 1962)
- Bill Potts, the Jazz Soul of Porgy & Bess (United Artists, 1959)
- Gene Quill, 3 Bones and a Quill (Vogue, 1959)
- Frank Rehak, Jazzville Vol. 2 (Dawn, 1987)
- Dizzy Reece, Asia Minor (New Jazz, 1962)
- Johnny Richards, Live in Stereo 1957-1958 Broadcasts (Jazz Hour, 1991)
- Sam Rivers, Zenith (Archive Series Volume 2) (NoBusiness, 2019) recorded in 1977
- Sonny Rollins, Tenor Titan (VSP 1966)
- Howard Rumsey, Double or Nothin (Liberty 1957)
- Sal Salvador, The Beat for This Generation (Decca, 1959)
- Hal Schaefer, Ten Shades of Blue (United Artists, 1959)
- Bobby Scott, A Taste of Honey (Atlantic, 1960)
- Archie Shepp, Ballads for Trane (Denon, 1977)
- Clark Terry, Everything's Mellow (Moodsville, 1961)
- Big Joe Turner, Big Joe Rides Again (Atlantic, 1960)
- Dinah Washington, Dinah Washington Sings Fats Waller (Mercury, 1959)
- Ernie Wilkins, Here Comes the Swingin' Mr. Wilkins! (Everest, 1960)
- Kai Winding, Dance to the City Beat (Columbia, 1959)
- Leo Wright, Blues Shout (Atlantic, 1960)
- Mal Waldron, The Quest (New Jazz, 1962)
- Phil Woods, The Young Bloods with Donald Byrd (Prestige, 1956)
- Phil Woods, Bird Feathers (Prestige, 1957)
