= Trackin' (album) =

Studio album by Eddie "Lockjaw" Davis
- Released: 1962
- Recorded: November 15, 1962
- Studio: Van Gelder Studio, Englewood Cliffs, NJ
- Genre: Jazz
- Length: 36:09
- Label: Prestige; PRLP 7271
- Producer: Ozzie Cadena

Eddie "Lockjaw" Davis chronology
I Only Have Eyes for You (1962)	Trackin' (1962)	Lock, the Fox (1966)

Professional ratings
Review scores
Source	Rating
Down Beat	4/5 stars
Allmusic	3/5 stars

Trackin' is an album by saxophonist Eddie "Lockjaw" Davis recorded in 1962 for the Prestige label.

== Reception ==
Critic Don Nelsen wrote in his Down Beat review in the December 19, 1963 issue: "This is a blue-chip performance from Davis & Co. As usual the tenorist swings with big sound and unabashed attack, but rarely has he been so inventive with his horn as he is here."

The Allmusic review states simply "A five piece with Don Patterson on the Hammond B-3 and Paul Weeden on guitar".

== Track listing ==
1. "There Will Never Be Another You" (Mack Gordon, Harry Warren) - 4:46
2. "What's New?" (Johnny Burke, Bob Haggart) - 4:00
3. "Too Marvelous for Words" (Johnny Mercer, Richard A. Whiting) - 4:35
4. "A Foggy Day" (George Gershwin, Ira Gershwin) - 5:07
5. "Beano" (John Campbell) - 5:18
6. "Day by Day" (Sammy Cahn, Axel Stordahl, Paul Weston) - 6:45
7. "Robbins Nest" (Illinois Jacquet, Bob Russell, Sir Charles Thompson) - 5:38

== Personnel ==
- Eddie "Lockjaw" Davis - tenor saxophone
- Don Patterson - organ
- Paul Weeden - guitar
- George Duvivier - bass
- Billy James - drums
