= Goin' to the Meeting =

Studio album by Eddie "Lockjaw" Davis
- Released: 1962
- Recorded: May 1, 1962
- Studio: Van Gelder Studio, Englewood Cliffs, NJ
- Genre: Jazz
- Length: 37:02
- Label: Prestige; PRLP 7242
- Producer: Esmond Edwards

Eddie "Lockjaw" Davis chronology
Jawbreakers (1962)	Goin' to the Meeting (1962)	I Only Have Eyes for You (1962)

Goin' to the Meeting is an album by saxophonist Eddie "Lockjaw" Davis recorded in 1962 for the Prestige label.

== Reception ==
Professional ratings
Review scores
Source	Rating
Down Beat	2/5 stars
Allmusic	4/5 stars
The Penguin Guide to Jazz Recordings	3/4 stars

The Allmusic review states, "Goin' to the Meetin showcases Horace Parlan in a way even his Blue Note records didn't. While Davis appears to be the leader because of his beat generation bluesed-out swing in the solos and brief melodic statements, it's Parlan, on the title track, "Pass the Hat," and "Night and Day," who carries the tunes and turns them into a very sophisticated and subtle kind of jazz that allows for both the simplicity of a raw-toned, grooved-out blues statement and simultaneously created the space for a harmonic improvisation that employed counterpoint and intervallic architecture for the rhythm section. Parlan's own soloing is nothing less than soulful, but it is considerably more than soul he's playing. Moreover, Parlan is laying down the sophistication evidenced in the post-bop and modal playing of both Bill Evans and Horace Silver".

== Track listing ==
All compositions by Eddie "Lockjaw" Davis except as indicated

1. "Goin' to the Meetin'" - 5:25
2. "People Will Say We're in Love" (Oscar Hammerstein II, Richard Rodgers) - 3:01
3. "Night and Day" (Cole Porter) - 4:57
4. "Pass the Hat" - 3:38
5. "Yes, Yes" - 3:44
6. "Please Send Me Someone to Love" (Percy Mayfield) - 3:56
7. "Love Is Here to Stay" (George Gershwin, Ira Gershwin) - 2:33
8. "Oh Babee" - 5:31
9. "Little Cougar" - 4:14

== Personnel ==
- Eddie "Lockjaw" Davis - tenor saxophone
- Horace Parlan - piano
- Buddy Catlett - bass
- Art Taylor - drums
- Willie Bobo - congas
