= Vamp 'til Ready =

Studio album by Jo Jones and His Orchestra
- Released: 1960
- Recorded: April 19, 1960
- Studio: New York City, NY
- Genre: Jazz
- Length: 39:27
- Label: Everest; LPBR 5099/SDBR 1099
- Producer: Raymond Scott

Jo Jones chronology
Jo Jones Plus Two (1958)	Vamp 'til Ready (1960)	Percussion and Bass (1960)

Vamp 'til Ready (also released as Jo Jones Sextet) is an album recorded by drummer Jo Jones in 1960 and released by the Everest label.

== Reception ==
Professional ratings
Review scores
Source	Rating
AllMusic	4/5 stars
All About Jazz	4/5 stars

Allmusic's Scott Yanow noted, "Some songs only use one or two of the horns, but each player gets his spot. Edison was very consistent during the era, and Forrest has a few muscular tenor solos. Fans of small group swing and drummers who want to hear Jones in a couple of well-recorded sets will enjoy this". On All About Jazz, David Rickert wrote "Vamp 'Til Ready, is an informal jam session featuring an outstanding line-up".

== Track listing ==
1. "Vamp 'til Ready" (Jo Jones) – 3:25
2. "You're Getting to Be a Habit with Me" (Harry Warren, Al Dubin) – 2:27
3. "Should I" (Nacio Herb Brown, Arthur Freed) – 2:45
4. "Sandy's Body" (Jones) – 2:53
5. "Thou Swell" (Richard Rodgers, Lorenz Hart) – 3:30
6. "Show Time" (Jones) – 3:30
7. "Liza" (George Gershwin, Ira Gershwin, Gus Kahn) – 2:37
8. "But Not for Me" (Gershwin, Gershwin) – 3:00
9. "Royal Garden Blues" (Clarence Williams, Spencer Williams) – 3:12
10. "Mozelle's Alley" (Jones) – 3:00
11. "Sox Trot" (Jones) – 3:20
12. "In the Forrest" (Jones, Jimmy Forrest) – 2:37

== Personnel ==
- Jo Jones – drums
- Harry Edison – trumpet
- Bennie Green – trombone
- Jimmy Forrest – tenor saxophone
- Tommy Flanagan – piano
- Tommy Potter – bass
