= Forrest Fire =

Studio album by Jimmy Forrest
- Released: 1960
- Recorded: August 9, 1960
- Studio: Van Gelder Studio, Englewood Cliffs, NJ
- Genre: Jazz
- Length: 39:39
- Label: New Jazz; NJLP 8250
- Producer: Esmond Edwards

Jimmy Forrest chronology
All the Gin is Gone (1959)	Forrest Fire (1960)	Out of the Forrest (1961)

Forrest Fire is an album by saxophonist Jimmy Forrest recorded in 1960 and released on the New Jazz label.

== Reception ==
Professional ratings
Review scores
Source	Rating
AllMusic	4/5 stars
The Penguin Guide to Jazz Recordings	3/4 stars

Scott Yanow of Allmusic described the album as "excellent music that is also quite accessible".

== Track listing ==
All compositions by Jimmy Forrest except as indicated

1. "Remember" (Irving Berlin) - 5:27
2. "Dexter's Deck" (Dexter Gordon) - 6:37
3. "Jim's Jam" - 8:54
4. "Bags' Groove" (Milt Jackson) - 8:25
5. "When Your Lover Has Gone" (Einar Aaron Swan) - 5:27
6. "Help!" (Doug Watkins) - 4:49

== Personnel ==
- Jimmy Forrest - tenor saxophone
- Larry Young - organ
- Thornel Schwartz - guitar
- Jimmie Smith - drums
- Unknown - congas

=== Production ===
- Esmond Edwards - supervisor
- Rudy Van Gelder - engineer
