= Patented by Edison =

Studio album by Harry "Sweets" Edison
- Released: 1960
- Recorded: February 12, 1960
- Studios: New York City, NY
- Genre: Jazz
- Length: 67:57
- Label: Roulette Records
- Producer: Teddy Reig

Harry "Sweets" Edison chronology
Sweetenings (1958)	Patented by Edison (1960)	Together (1961)

Patented by Edison is a 1960 jazz album by American jazz trumpeter Harry "Sweets" Edison and the Harry "Sweets" Edison Quintet.

The album, recorded in New York City on February 12, 1960 (the recording date is posted on the album cover) and first issued on the Roulette Records label under catalog number SR 52041, features mostly standards from the likes of George Gershwin, Irving Berlin and Count Basie, for whom Edison played trumpet. Teddy Reig is credited as the producer.

== Track listing ==
1. "Witchcraft"
2. "Blue Skies"
3. "I'm Confessin' That I Love You"
4. "Ain't Misbehavin'"
5. "Candied Sweets"
6. "They Can't Take That Away from Me"
7. "Tea for Two"
8. "There Is No Greater Love"
9. "Twenty-Forty"
10. "It's Easy to Remember"
11. "Sweetcakes"
12. "Angel Eyes"

== Musicians ==
- Harry "Sweets" Edison - trumpet
- Tommy Flanagan - piano
- Elvin Jones - drums
- Jimmy Forrest - tenor saxophone
- Tommy Potter - bass
