= Together (Joe Williams and Harry Edison album) =

Studio album by Joe Williams and Harry "Sweets" Edison
- Released: 1961
- Recorded: January 31 and February 1 & 2, 1961
- Studio: Los Angeles, CA
- Genre: Jazz
- Label: Roulette; R/SR 52069
- Producer: Teddy Reig

Joe Williams chronology
Sentimental & Melancholy (1961)	Together (1961)	Have a Good Time with Joe Williams (1962)

Harry "Sweets" Edison chronology
Patented by Edison (1960)	Together (1961)	Jawbreakers (1962)

Together is an album by vocalist Joe Williams and trumpeter Harry "Sweets" Edison which was originally released on the Roulette label.

== Reception ==
Professional ratings
Review scores
Source	Rating
AllMusic	3/5 stars

AllMusic reviewer Scott Yanow stated "The Together set matches Williams and Edison with tenor saxophonist Jimmy Foster and a four-piece rhythm section that includes pianist Sir Charles Thompson. Among the highlights of the dozen standards are "I Don't Know Why", "Aren't You Glad You're You?", and "Lover Come Back to Me".

== Track listing ==
1. "Winter Weather" (Ted Shapiro) – 1:52
2. "I Don't Know Why (I Just Do)" (Fred E. Ahlert, Roy Turk) – 2:30
3. "There's a Small Hotel" (Richard Rodgers, Lorenz Hart) – 2:19
4. "Out of Nowhere" (Johnny Green, Edward Heyman) – 2:14
5. "Aren't You Glad You're You?" (Jimmy Van Heusen, Johnny Burke) – 2:27
6. "Remember" (Irving Berlin) – 1:52
7. "Together" (Buddy DeSylva, Lew Brown) – 2:28
8. "Deep Purple" (Peter DeRose, Mitchell Parish) – 2:48
9. "Always" (Berlin) – 2:37
10. "Lover Came Back" (Victor Herbert, Frederika de Grasec, Harry B. Smith) – 4:05
11. "By the River Sainte Marie" (Edgar Leslie]], Harry Warren) – 1:57
12. "Alone Together" (Arthur Schwartz, Howard Dietz) – 2:30

== Personnel ==
- Joe Williams – vocals
- Harry "Sweets" Edison – trumpet
- Jimmy Forrest – tenor saxophone
- "Sir" Charles Thompson – piano
- Tommy Potter – bass
- Clarence Johnston – drums
- Unidentified musician – guitar
