= The Fox & the Hounds =

Studio album by Eddie "Lockjaw" Davis
- Released: 1967
- Recorded: 1967; RCA Victor Studio A, New York City
- Genre: Jazz
- Label: RCA Victor; LSP 3741
- Producer: Brad McCuen

Eddie "Lockjaw" Davis chronology
Lock, the Fox (1966)	The Fox & the Hounds (1967)	Love Calls (1967)

Professional ratings
Review scores
Source	Rating
Allmusic	3/5 stars

The Fox & the Hounds is an album by saxophonist Eddie "Lockjaw" Davis fronting a big band recorded in 1967 for the RCA Victor label.

== Reception ==
The Allmusic site awarded the album 3 stars.

== Track listing ==
1. "I Wished on the Moon" (Dorothy Parker, Ralph Rainger) - 2:22
2. "When Your Lover Has Gone" (Einar Aaron Swan) - 2:02
3. "Born to Be Blue" (Mel Tormé, Robert Wells) - 4:17
4. "People Will Say We're in Love" (Oscar Hammerstein II, Richard Rodgers) - 3:25
5. "Day by Day" (Sammy Cahn, Axel Stordahl, Paul Weston) - 2:28
6. "Bye Bye Blackbird" (Mort Dixon, Ray Henderson) - 2:43
7. "Call Me" (Tony Hatch) - 3:24
8. "This Is Always" (Mack Gordon, Harry Warren) - 3:26
9. "I Remember You" (Johnny Mercer, Victor Schertzinger) - 3:08
10. "Out of Nowhere" (Johnny Green, Edward Heyman) - 2:08

== Personnel ==
- Eddie "Lockjaw" Davis - tenor saxophone
- Unnamed Big Band arranged by Bobby Plater
