= Joe Benjamin =

American jazz bassist (1919–1974)

Joseph Rupert Benjamin (November 4, 1919 – January 26, 1974) was an American jazz bassist.

Born in Atlantic City, New Jersey, Benjamin played with many jazz musicians in a variety of idioms. Early in his career he played in the big bands of Artie Shaw, Fletcher Henderson, Sy Oliver, and Duke Ellington.

Later credits include work with Roland Kirk, Hank Garland, Dave Brubeck, Marian McPartland, Louis Armstrong (in his later years), Mal Waldron, Jo Jones, Gary Burton, Sarah Vaughan, Roy Haynes, Art Taylor, and Brother Jack McDuff.

Benjamin never recorded as a leader.

== Partial discography ==
=== As sideman ===
With Tony Bennett

- I've Gotta Be Me (Columbia, 1969)

With Teresa Brewer

- It Don't Mean A Thing If It Ain't Got That Swing (Flying Dutchman, 1973)

With Bob Brookmeyer

- Traditionalism Revisited (World Pacific, 1957)

With Oscar Brown

- Sin & Soul (Columbia, 1960)

With Kenny Burrell

- Weaver of Dreams (Columbia, 1961)
- Guitar Forms (Verve, 1965)

With Dave Brubeck

- Newport 1958 (Columbia, 1958)
- Jazz Impressions of Eurasia (Columbia, 1958)

With Ray Charles

- Genius + Soul = Jazz (Impulse!, 1961)

With Harry Edison

- The Swinger (Verve, 1958)
- Harry Edison Swings Buck Clayton (Verve, 1958) with Buck Clayton
- Mr. Swing (Verve, 1960)

With Duke Ellington

- All Star Road Band (Doctor Jazz, 1983)

With Dizzy Gillespie

- The Great Blue Star Sessions 1952-1953 (EmArcy, 2004)

With Barry Harris

- Preminado (Riverside, 1961)

With Roy Haynes

- Jazz Abroad (Emarcy, 1955)

With Johnny Hodges

- Triple Play (RCA Victor, 1967)

With Budd Johnson

- Blues a la Mode (Felsted, 1958)
- Budd Johnson and the Four Brass Giants (Riverside, 1960)

With Roland Kirk

- Kirk's Work (Prestige, 1961)

With Gary McFarland

- The Jazz Version of "How to Succeed in Business without Really Trying" (Verve, 1962)

With Carmen McRae

- Book of Ballads (Kapp, 1958)

With Gerry Mulligan

- The Teddy Wilson Trio & Gerry Mulligan Quartet with Bob Brookmeyer at Newport (Verve, 1957)
- Blues in Time (Verve, 1957) with Paul Desmond
- Two of a Mind (RCA Victor, 1962) with Paul Desmond

With Jerome Richardson

- Midnight Oil (New Jazz, 1959)

With Al Sears

- Things Ain't What They Used to Be (Swingville, 1961) as part of the Prestige Swing Festival

With Joya Sherrill

- Joya Sherrill Sings Duke (20th Century Fox, 1965)

With Rex Stewart

- Rendezvous with Rex (Felsted, 1958)

With Sonny Stitt

- Sonny Stitt & the Top Brass (Atlantic, 1962)

With Buddy Tate

- Swinging Like Tate (Felsted, 1958)

With Clark Terry

- Color Changes (Candid, 1960)
- Everything's Mellow (Moodsville, 1961)

With The Three Playmates

- The Three Playmates - The Three Playmates with George Barrow, Jerome Richardson, Budd Johnson, Sam Price, Kenny Burrell, Joe Benjamin, Bobby Donaldson, Ernie Wilkins (arranger) (Savoy Records, 1957)

With Sarah Vaughan

- Sarah Vaughan with Clifford Brown (EmArcy, 1954)
- In the Land of Hi-Fi (EmArcy, 1955)
- Swingin' Easy (EmArcy, 1957)

With Mal Waldron

- The Quest (New Jazz, 1961)

With Kai Winding

- Dance to the City Beat (Columbia, 1959)
