= Sonny Stitt (album) =

Studio album by Sonny Stitt
- Released: 1958
- Recorded: 1958; Chicago, Illinois
- Genre: Jazz
- Label: Argo; LP 629

Sonny Stitt chronology
The Saxophones of Sonny Stitt (1958)	Sonny Stitt (1958)	Burnin' (1958)

Professional ratings
Review scores
Source	Rating
Allmusic	3/5 stars

Sonny Stitt is an album by saxophonist Sonny Stitt recorded in Chicago in 1958 and originally released on the Argo label.

== Reception ==
The Allmusic review stated "Stitt, doubling on alto and tenor, plays some songs with unfamiliar titles, but all of the chord changes of the originals (half of them blues) are fairly basic. He is in above-average form, making this CD reissue of interest to bebop collectors".

== Track listing ==
All compositions by Sonny Stitt except as indicated

1. "Propapagoon" - 4:14
2. "This Is Always" (Mack Gordon, Harry Warren) - 3:01
3. "Jack Spratt" - 6:20
4. "Just You, Just Me" (Jesse Greer, Raymond Klages) - 5:12
5. "Cool Blues" (Charlie Parker) - 3:55
6. "Mr. Sun" - 4:42
7. "Dancing on the Ceiling" (Rodgers and Hart) - 4:38
8. "Everyone Does" - 5:07
9. "With a Song in My Heart" (Rodgers and Hart) - mislabeled "Till the End of Time" (Buddy Kaye, Ted Mossman) - 5:31 Bonus track on CD reissue

== Personnel ==
- Sonny Stitt - alto saxophone (tracks 1, 2, 5, 6, 8 & 9) - tenor saxophone (tracks 3, 4 & 7)
- Ramsey Lewis - piano
- Eldee Young - bass
- Isaac "Red" Holt - drums
