= The High and Mighty Hawk =

Studio album by Coleman Hawkins
- Released: 1958
- Recorded: February 18–19, 1958
- Studio: NYC
- Genre: Jazz
- Length: 39:53
- Label: Felsted; FAJ.7005
- Producer: Stanley Dance

Coleman Hawkins chronology
The Saxophone Section (1958)	The High and Mighty Hawk (1958)	Bean Bags (1958)

The High and Mighty Hawk is an album by saxophonist Coleman Hawkins which was recorded in 1958 and released on the Felsted label.

== Reception ==
Professional ratings
Review scores
Source	Rating
AllMusic	4/5 stars

Scott Yanow of AllMusic states: "For one of the first times, on the lengthy 'Bird of Prey Blues' that opens this LP, Hawkins showed that at last he had mastered the blues. His honking and roaring improvisation, although more sophisticated than the usual solos by R&B tenors, captured their spirit and extroverted emotions perfectly. It is the highlight of this otherwise excellent (if more conventional) quintet session."

== Track listing ==
1. "Bird of Prey Blues" (Coleman Hawkins) – 11:15
2. "My One and Only Love" (Guy Wood, Robert Mellin) – 7:24
3. "Vignette" (Hank Jones) – 4:31
4. "Ooh-Wee, Miss G.P.!" (Hawkins) – 4:00
5. "You've Changed" (Bill Carey, Carl T. Fischer) – 7:42
6. "Get Set" (Jones) – 5:01

== Personnel ==
- Coleman Hawkins – tenor saxophone
- Buck Clayton – trumpet
- Hank Jones – piano
- Ray Brown – bass
- Mickey Sheen – drums
