= Black Forrest =

Studio album by Jimmy Forrest
- Released: 1972
- Recorded: December 10 & 12, 1959
- Studios: Hall Studios, Chicago
- Genre: Jazz
- Length: 44:04
- Labels: Delmark; DL-427
- Producer: Robert G. Koester

Jimmy Forrest chronology
All the Gin Is Gone (1965)	Black Forrest (1972)	Live at Rick's (1978)

Black Forrest is an album by the American jazz saxophonist Jimmy Forrest recorded in 1959 but not released by the Delmark label until 1972. The album features alternate takes and five other songs recorded at the sessions that produced All the Gin Is Gone.

== Reception ==
Professional ratings
Review scores
Source	Rating
Allmusic	3/5 stars
The Penguin Guide to Jazz Recordings	3/4 stars

Allmusic reviewer Scott Yanow stated "Forrest sounds fine, guitarist Grant Green was making his debut on record, and the rhythm section plays up to par. Get All the Gin Is Gone first, and then, if one wants to hear the rest of the story, this set".

== Track listing ==
All compositions by Jimmy Forrest except where noted

1. "Black Forrest (First Take)" – 5:20
2. "Dog It" – 4:46
3. "These Foolish Things" (Jack Strachey, Holt Marvell, Harry Link) – 6:07
4. "Sunkenfoal" – 5:54
5. "You Go to My Head" (J. Fred Coots, Haven Gillespie) – 4:43
6. "Black Forrest" – 2:28
7. "What's New?" (Bob Haggart, Johnny Burke) – 2:11
8. "But Beautiful" (Jimmy Van Heusen, Johnny Burke) – 4:19
9. "All the Gin Is Gone" – 4:48

Bonus track on CD reissue in 1999:

10. "These Foolish Things" [Alternate Take] - 4:13

== Personnel ==
- Jimmy Forrest - tenor saxophone
- Grant Green – guitar (tracks 2, 3, 4, 8 & 9)
- Harold Mabern – piano
- Gene Ramey – bass
- Elvin Jones – drums
