= The Saxophones of Sonny Stitt =

Studio album by Sonny Stitt
- Released: 1959
- Recorded: April 2, 1958
- Studio: Nola's Penthouse Sound, New York City
- Genre: Jazz
- Label: Roost; RLP 2230
- Producer: Teddy Reig

Sonny Stitt chronology
Sonny Side Up (1957)	The Saxophones of Sonny Stitt (1959)	Sonny Stitt (1958)

Professional ratings
Review scores
Source	Rating
AllMusic	3/5 stars

The Saxophones of Sonny Stitt is an album by saxophonist Sonny Stitt, released in 1959 on the Roost label.

== Reception ==
AllMusic awarded the album 3 stars.

== Track listing ==
All compositions by Sonny Stitt except as indicated

1. "Happy Faces" - 3:40
2. "Am I Blue?" (Harry Akst, Grant Clarke) - 2:57
3. "I'll Be Seeing You" (Irving Kahal, Sammy Fain) - 2:05
4. "When You're Smiling" (Larry Shay, Mark Fisher, Joe Goodwin) - 3:34
5. "In a Little Spanish Town" (Mabel Wayne, Sam M. Lewis, Joe Young) - 4:00
6. "Them There Eyes" (Maceo Pinkard, Doris Tauber, William Tracey) - 3:42
7. "Back in Your Own Back Yard" (Al Jolson, Billy Rose, Dave Dreyer) - 3:26
8. "Foot Tapper" - 3:05
9. "Sometimes I Feel Like a Motherless Child" (Traditional) - 2:44
10. "Shadow Waltz" (Harry Warren, Al Dubin) - 2:08
11. "Wind-Up" - 3:35

== Personnel ==
- Sonny Stitt - alto saxophone 3,5,8 and 11, tenor saxophone
- Jimmy Jones - piano
- Unknown musician - bass
- Charlie Persip - drums
