= Going for Myself =

Studio album by Harry "Sweets" Edison and Lester Young
- Released: 1958
- Recorded: July 31, 1957, Hollywood, Los Angeles (February 7, 1958, New York City, reissue bonus tracks)
- Genre: Jazz
- Length: 42:59 (original LP); 75:50 (CD reissue)
- Label: Verve; MGV 8298; Lone Hill Jazz; LHJ10344
- Producer: Norman Granz

Professional ratings
Review scores
Source	Rating
AllMusic	4/5 stars
DownBeat	5/5 stars

Going For Myself is an album by Harry "Sweets" Edison and Lester Young, accompanied by Oscar Peterson. The album is one of Young's last studio recordings.

== Track listing ==
1. "Flic" (Oscar Peterson, Lester Young) - 06:16
2. "Love Is Here to Stay" (George Gershwin, Ira Gershwin) - 05:53
3. "St. Tropez" (Harry "Sweets" Edison, Peterson, Young) - 10:05
4. "Waldorf Blues" (Young) - 08:19
5. "Sunday" (Chester Conn, Benny Krueger, Ned Miller, Jule Styne) - 06:55
6. "You're Getting to Be a Habit with Me" (Al Dubin, Harry Warren) - 07:43

Bonus tracks on CD reissue in 2012:

7. Ballad medley: "A Ghost of a Chance"/"I Cover the Waterfront" (Ned Washington, Ned Young, Bing Crosby)/(Johnny Green, Edward Heyman) - 5:51
8. "Perdido" (Juan Tizol, Ervin Drake, Hans Lengsfelder) - 6:14
9. "St. Tropez" - 6:55 - Alternate take
10. "You're Getting to Be a Habit with Me" - 7:43 - Alternate take
11. "Waldorf Blues" 6:16 - Alternate take

== Personnel ==
- Lester Young - tenor saxophone, clarinet (03 & 09)
- Harry "Sweets" Edison - trumpet

(Hollywood, July 31, 1957) (Tracks# 01-03, 07-09)

- Oscar Peterson - piano
- Herb Ellis - guitar
- Ray Brown - double bass
- Louie Bellson - drums

(New York, February 7, 1958) (Tracks# 04-06, 10-11)

- Lou Stein - piano
- Herb Ellis - guitar
- Ray Brown - double bass
- Mickey Sheen - drums
