= Al Hall (musician) =

American jazz bassist

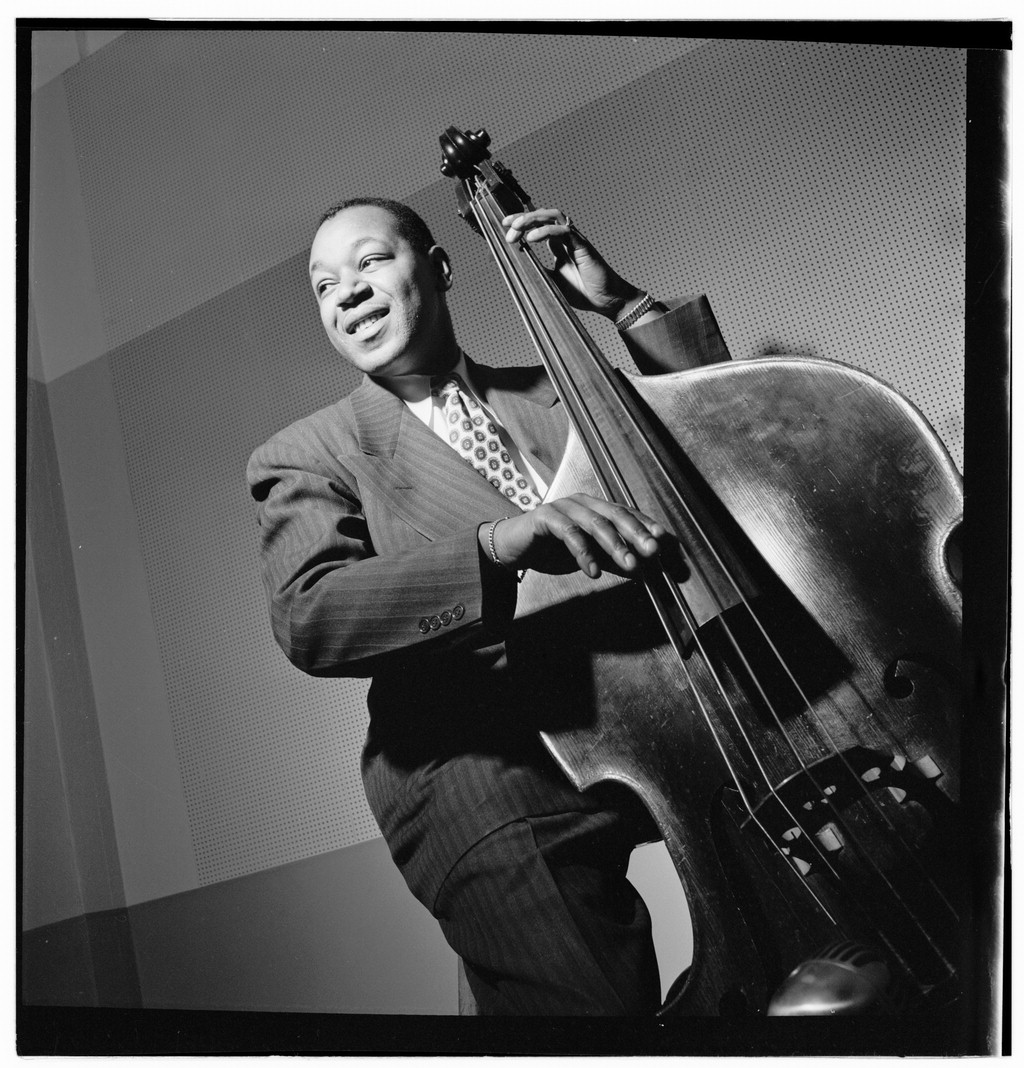
- Al Hall, c. July 1947

Background information
- Born: Alfred Wesley Hall; March 18, 1915; Jacksonville, Florida, U.S.
- Died: January 18, 1988 (aged 72) New York City, U.S.
- Genres: Jazz
- Occupation: Musician
- Instrument: Double bass

Alfred Wesley Hall (March 18, 1915 – January 18, 1988) was an American jazz bassist.

== Biography ==
Hall grew up in Philadelphia, where he played cello and tuba early in life before settling on bass at the age of 17. He moved to New York in 1936, where he played with Billy Hicks (1936–37), Skeets Tolbert (1937–38), and Teddy Wilson in both big band and small ensemble format (1939–41). Following time with Ellis Larkins (1942–43) and Mary Lou Williams, Hall took a job as a staff musician at CBS, working in Paul Baron's orchestra on the Mildred Bailey Show. He also worked on Broadway theater pit orchestras for the next several decades. In 1946, he founded his own label, Wax Records, which was bought by Atlantic Records in 1949.

Hall had an extended partnership with Erroll Garner, playing with him intermittently from 1945 to 1963. He also played later in life with Benny Goodman (1966), Hazel Scott, Tiny Grimes, Alberta Hunter (1977–78), and Doc Cheatham. He led five numbers on his own label in 1946–47 and four on Columbia Records Europe in 1959.

Hall died of lung cancer Monday at Roosevelt Hospital. He was 72 years old and lived in Manhattan.

== Discography ==
=== As sideman ===
- Harold Ashby, Born to Swing (Columbia, 1960)
- Eddie Condon, Jammin at Condon's (Columbia, 1955)
- Eddie Condon, That Toddlin' Town (Warner Bros., 1959)
- Duke Ellington & Johnny Hodges, Side by Side (Verve, 1971)
- Bud Freeman, Bud Freeman (Bethlehem, 1955)
- Edmond Hall, Rumpus On Rampart Street (Rae Cox 1959)
- Erroll Garner, The Most Happy Piano (Columbia, 1957)
- Erroll Garner, Encores in Hi Fi (Columbia, 1958)
- Paul Gonsalves & Ray Nance, Just A-Sittin and A-Rockin (Black Lion, 1973)
- Earl Hines & Paul Gonsalves, It Don't Mean a Thing If It Ain't Got That Swing! (Black Lion, 1974)
- Pete Johnson, Pete's Blues (Savoy, 1958)
- Barbara Lea, Barbara Lea with the Johnny Windhurst Quintets (Prestige, 1956)
- Barbara Lea, Lea in Love (Prestige, 1956)
- Helen Merrill, You've Got a Date with the Blues (Metrojazz, 1958)
- Barry Miles, Miles of Genius (Charlie Parker, 1962)
- Fats Navarro, Fats Bud Klook Sonny Kinney (Savoy, 1955)
- Charlie Parker, Bird Lives (Continental, 1962)
- Paul Quinichette, Moods (Emarcy, 1954)
- Della Reese, Melancholoy Baby (Jubilee, 1956)
- Billy Strayhorn, Cue for Saxophone (Felsted, 1959)
- Ralph Sutton & Bob Wilber, The Night They Raided Sunnie's (Blue Angel Jazz Club 1969)
- Big Joe Turner & Pete Johnson, Joe Turner and Pete Johnson (Emarcy, 1955)
- Big Joe Turner, And the Blues'll Make You Happy Too (Savoy, 1958)
- Charlie Ventura, Jumping with Ventura (Emarcy, 1955)
- Charlie Ventura, East of Suez (Regent, 1958)
- Josh White, Josh at Midnight (Elektra, 1956)
- Josh White, Josh White Sings Ballads/Blues (Elektra, 1957)
- Josh White, The Josh White Stories II (ABC-Paramount, 1958)
- Teddy Wilson, Teddy Wilson and His All Star Jazz Sextet (Allego, 1956)
- Teddy Wilson, Stompin' at the Savoy (Ember, 1974)
