= Allan M. Brandt =

American medical historian

- Born: 1953 (age 72–73); Washington, D.C., U.S.
- Education: Brandeis University (BA); Columbia University (MA, MPhil, PhD)
- Scientific career
- Fields: History of Medicine
- Workplaces: Columbia University; Harvard University

Allan Morris Brandt (born 1953) is a historian of medicine and the Amalie Kass Professor of History of Medicine and Professor of the History of Science at Harvard University. He is an author of several books, including The Cigarette Century: The Rise, Fall, and Deadly Persistence of the Product that Defined America, which was a finalist for the Pulitzer Prize for General Nonfiction.

== Life ==
Brandt received his B.A. in history from Brandeis University in 1974. He then attended Columbia University, where he received his Ph.D. (1983) in American history. He has written on the social history of epidemic disease; the history of public health and health policy; and the history of human experimentation among other topics. In 1998, he was elected to the Institute of Medicine of the National Academy of Sciences. In September 2004, he testified as an expert witness for the U.S. Department of Justice in United States v. Philip Morris. The federal district court judge in the case found that the companies had violated racketeering and fraud (RICO) statutes over a fifty-year period. Brandt has been elected to the Institute of Medicine of the National Academy of Sciences and the American Academy of Arts and Sciences.

His most recent book, The Cigarette Century, was awarded the Bancroft Prize in 2008.

He is co-author of a 1985 article about AIDS in Harper's.

He is also co-author of an influential paper in The New England Journal of Medicine examining the journal's silence during the Holocaust — one of the most consequential silences in the history of modern medicine. The paper received extensive international coverage, including in The New York Times and Le Monde.

Brandt is a fellow of the Hastings Center, a bioethics research center.

== Awards ==
- 2011 The William H. Welch Medal of the American Association for the History of Medicine
- 2008 Bancroft Prize
- 2007 Albert J. Beveridge Award from the American Historical Association and the Arthur Viseltear Prize from the American Public Health Association for The Cigarette Century: The Rise, Fall, and Deadly Persistence of the Product that Defined America

== Books ==
- The Cigarette Century: The Rise, Fall, and Deadly Persistence of the Product That Defined America. Basic Books. 2007. ISBN 978-0-465-07047-3.
- No Magic Bullet: A Social History of Venereal Disease in the United States Since 1880. Oxford University Press. 1987. ISBN 978-0-19-504237-5. "Allan M Brandt."
- Allan M. Brandt; Paul Rozin, eds. (1997). Morality and Health. Routledge. ISBN 978-0-415-91582-3.

== See also ==
- Tobacco in the United States
