= Sol Yaged =

American jazz clarinetist (1922–2019)

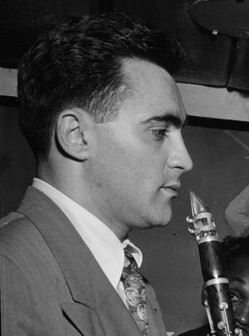
Sol Yaged c. September 1946; photograph by William P. Gottlieb

Sol Yaged (December 8, 1922 – May 11, 2019) was an American jazz clarinetist who was strongly influenced by Benny Goodman.

== Life and career ==
Yaged was born in Brooklyn, New York and began playing the clarinet at the age of 12 after hearing Goodman's broadcasts for Nabisco in 1935. He studied under a clarinetist for the New York Philharmonic but turned down a classical career to play jazz in New York City nightclubs, such as Jimmy Ryan's and the Swing Club.

After serving in the Army for three years during World War II, Yaged played clarinet with professional groups continuously for over 70 years, with such musicians as Phil Napoleon, Coleman Hawkins, Red Allen, and Jack Teagarden. Beginning in the 1960s, he began working primarily as an ensemble leader in New York City. In the 1990s he worked in Felix Endico's swing band. Yaged served as a consultant on Benny Goodman's musical style for the 1956 film, The Benny Goodman Story.

From 1996–97, he worked under the musical direction of bandleader Jack Vartan at the Stony Hill Inn, Bergen County, New Jersey.

== Family ==
Yaged's wife, Zelda (April 8, 1925 – January 31, 1994), died from cancer at age 68. They had two children.

== Discography ==
- It Might as Well Be Swing (Herald, 1956)
- Jazz at the Metropole (Philips, 1961)
- One More Time (Lane, 1967)
- Your Wish Is My Command (Pine Hill Records, 2019)

=== As sideman ===
- 1955 Horn o' Plenty, Charlie Shavers
- 1957 Stormy Weather, Red Allen
- 1968 The Music Room, Doug Duke
- 1997 Personal Choice, Jack Teagarden
- 1997 The Tenor for All Seasons: 1958–1959, Coleman Hawkins
- 2005 The Very Best of the Cole Porter Songbook, Cole Porter
