= Harry Edison =

American jazz trumpeter (1915–1999)

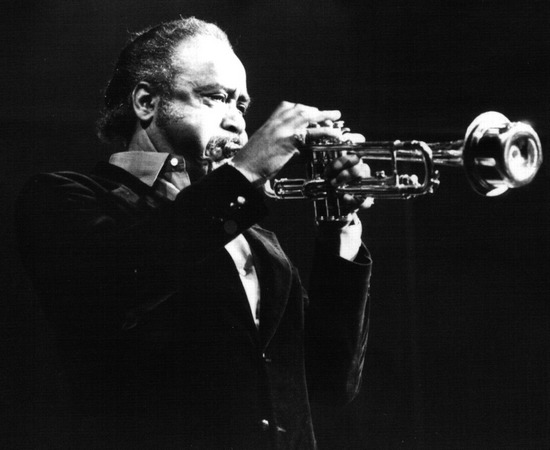
- Edison in Paris, 1980

Background information
- Born: October 10, 1915; Columbus, Ohio, U.S.
- Died: July 27, 1999 (aged 83) Columbus, Ohio, U.S.
- Genres: Jazz; swing
- Occupation: Musician
- Instrument: Trumpet
- Years active: 1933–1970s
- Labels: Pacific Jazz; Verve; Roulette; Riverside; Vee-Jay; Liberty; Sue; Black & Blue; Pablo; Storyville; Candid
- Formerly of: Jeter–Pillars Orchestra; Mills Blue Rhythm Band; Count Basie Orchestra

Harry "Sweets" Edison (October 10, 1915 – July 27, 1999) was an American jazz trumpeter and a member of the Count Basie Orchestra. His most important contribution was as a Hollywood studio musician, whose muted trumpet can be heard backing singers, most notably Frank Sinatra.

== Biography ==
Edison was born in Columbus, Ohio, United States. He spent his early childhood in Louisville, Kentucky, having been introduced to music by an uncle. After moving back to Columbus at the age of twelve, the young Edison began playing the trumpet with local bands.

In 1933, he became a member of the Jeter–Pillars Orchestra in Cleveland. Afterwards, he played with the Mills Blue Rhythm Band and Lucky Millinder. In 1937, he moved to New York and joined the Count Basie Orchestra. His colleagues included Buck Clayton, Lester Young (who named him "Sweets"), Buddy Tate, Freddie Green, Jo Jones, and other original members of that famous band. Speaking in 1956 with DownBeat's Don Freeman, Edison explained the origin of his nickname:

Well, this happened one day in March back in '37. All of us in the Basie band were sitting around the lobby of the Woodside Hotel in New York. It was snowing outside, and we were waiting for the bus to go on a tour of one-nighters. We were all like brothers in that band. I was kind of the baby of the band and took a lot of the ribbing. So this time Lester Young was joshing me about my 'sweet' style and he said: "We're going to call you 'Sweetie Pie.'" They did, too, for a few months. Then they shortened it to "Sweets." The nickname has kind of lasted a long time.

"Sweets" Edison came to prominence as a soloist with the Basie Band and as an occasional composer and arranger for the band. He also appeared in the 1944 film Jammin' the Blues.

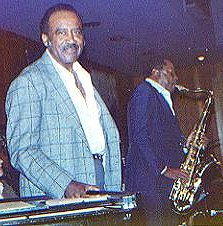
Edison with tenor saxophonist Eddie "Lockjaw" Davis in 1978

Edison spent thirteen years with Basie until the band was temporarily disbanded in 1950. Edison thereafter pursued a varied career as leader of his own groups, traveling with Jazz at the Philharmonic and freelancing with other orchestras. In the early 1950s, he settled on the West Coast and became a highly sought-after studio musician, making important contributions to recordings by such artists as Billie Holiday, Frank Sinatra, Nat King Cole, Billy Daniels, Margaret Whiting, Bing Crosby, and Ella Fitzgerald. In 1956, he recorded the first of three albums with Ben Webster. On Sinatra's albums, he worked closely with the arranger Nelson Riddle, who gave Edison a microphone that was separate from the rest of the trumpet section. He made use of a Harmon mute to improvise his solos and obbligatos. As Will Friedwald wrote in his 2018 book Sinatra! The Song is You, "Edison in particular was a past master at saying an awful lot in a very few notes, and most of his parts on Sinatra records consist of merely an extremely well-placed handful of beeps."

According to the Encyclopedia of Jazz in the Seventies, Edison in the 1960s and 1970s continued to work in many orchestras on television shows, including The Hollywood Palace and The Leslie Uggams Show, specials with Frank Sinatra, and prominently featured on the soundtrack and in the soundtrack album of the film Lady Sings the Blues. From 1973, Edison acted as musical director for Redd Foxx on theatre dates, at concerts, and in Las Vegas. He appeared frequently in Europe and Japan until shortly before his death. He was the Los Angeles Jazz Society's first Tribute Honoree.

Edison died of prostate cancer at his home in Columbus, Ohio, at the age of 83.

== Discography ==
=== As leader/co-leader ===
- Buddy and Sweets (Norgran, 1955) with Buddy Rich
- Pres and Sweets (Norgran, 1955) with Lester Young
- Sweets (Clef, 1956)
- Gee, Baby Ain't I Good to You (Verve, 1957) with Ben Webster
- Jazz Giants '58 (Verve, 1958) with Stan Getz and Gerry Mulligan
- Going for Myself (Verve, 1958) with Lester Young
- The Swinger (Verve, 1958)
- Mr. Swing (Verve, 1958 [1960])
- Harry Edison Swings Buck Clayton (Verve, 1958) with Buck Clayton
- Sweetenings (Roulette, 1958)
- Patented by Edison (Roulette, 1960)
- Together (Roulette, 1961) with Joe Williams
- Jawbreakers (Riverside, 1962) with Eddie "Lockjaw" Davis
- Wanted to Do One Together (Columbia, 1962) with Ben Webster
- "Sweets" for the Sweet (Sue, 1964)
- Sweets for the Sweet Taste of Love (Vee-Jay, 1964)
- When Lights Are Low (Liberty, 1966)
- The Trumpet Kings Meet Joe Turner (Pablo, 1974) with Big Joe Turner, Dizzy Gillespie, Roy Eldridge and Clark Terry
- Oscar Peterson and Harry Edison (Pablo, 1974) with Oscar Peterson
- Oscar Peterson and the Trumpet Kings – Jousts (Pablo, 1974) with Oscar Peterson, Dizzy Gillespie, Roy Eldridge and Clark Terry
- Edison's Lights (Pablo, 1976)
- Simply Sweets (Pablo, 1978) with Eddie "Lockjaw" Davis
- Just Friends (Pablo, 1978 [1980]) with John Haley Sims
- Meeting in Stockholm (Beaver Records, 1985) with Claes Crona
- Oscar Peterson + Harry Edison + Eddie "Cleanhead" Vinson (Pablo, 1986) with Oscar Peterson and Eddie "Cleanhead" Vinson
- For My Pals (Pablo, 1988)

=== As sideman ===
With Count Basie

- Memories Ad-Lib (Roulette, 1958)
- Breakfast Dance and Barbecue (Roulette, 1959)
- Hollywood...Basie's Way (Command, 1967)
- Basie's Beat (Verve, 1967)
- Basie's in the Bag (Brunswick, 1967)
- Standing Ovation (Dot, 1969)
- The Original American Decca Recordings (GRP, 1992) – rec. 1937–1939
- Live at the Sands (Before Frank) (Reprise, 1998) –rec. 1966

With Louie Bellson

- Skin Deep (Norgran, 1953)
- Drumorama! (Verve, 1957)
- Music, Romance and Especially Love (Verve, 1957)
- Louis Bellson at The Flamingo (Verve, 1957)
- Thunderbird (Impulse!, 1965)

With Ray Bryant

- Madison Time (Columbia, 1960)
- Dancing the Big Twist (Columbia, 1961)

With Benny Carter

- Wonderland (Pablo, 1986) – rec. 1976
- Elegy in Blue (MusicMasters, 1994)

With Duke Ellington with Johnny Hodges

- Side by Side (Verve, 1959)
- Back to Back (Verve, 1959)

With Ella Fitzgerald

- Ella Fitzgerald Sings the Cole Porter Songbook (1956, Verve)
- Get Happy! (1959, Verve)
- Hello, Love (1960, Verve)
- Whisper Not (1967, Verve)
- 30 by Ella (1968, Capitol)
- Ella Loves Cole (1972, Capitol)
- Fine and Mellow (1974, Pablo)
- All That Jazz (1989, Pablo)

With Billie Holiday

- Music for Torching (Norgran, 1955)
- Velvet Mood (Clef, 1956)
- Lady Sings the Blues (Clef, 1956)
- Body and Soul (Verve, 1957)
- Songs for Distingué Lovers (Verve, 1957)
- All or Nothing at All (Verve, 1958)

With Jo Jones

- Vamp 'til Ready (Everest, 1960)
- The Main Man (Pablo, 1977)

With Quincy Jones

- Go West, Man! (ABC, 1957)
- The Birth of a Band! (Mercury, 1959)
- Quincy Plays for Pussycats (Mercury, 1965) - rec. 1959–1965
- Walk, Don't Run (Verve, 1966)

With Buddy Rich

- The Swinging Buddy Rich (Norgran, 1954)
- The Wailing Buddy Rich (Norgran, 1955)
- This One's for Basie (Verve, 1956)
- Buddy Rich Sings Johnny Mercer (Verve, 1956)
- Buddy Rich Just Sings (Verve, 1957)
- Richcraft (Mercury, 1959)

With Shorty Rogers

- Shorty Rogers Courts the Count (RCA Victor, 1954)
- Martians Come Back! (Atlantic,1956) – rec. 1955
- Way Up There (Atlantic, 1957) – rec. 1955
- Shorty Rogers Plays Richard Rodgers (RCA Victor, 1957)

With Frank Sinatra

- Swing Easy! (Capitol, 1954)
- In the Wee Small Hours (Capitol, 1955)
- Songs for Swingin' Lovers! (Capitol, 1956)
- Close to You (Capitol, 1957)
- A Swingin' Affair! (Capitol, 1957)
- Only the Lonely (Capitol, 1958)
- Nice 'n' Easy (Capitol, 1960)
- Sinatra's Swingin' Session!!! (Capitol, 1961)
- Sinatra & Company (Reprise, 1971)
- Some Nice Things I've Missed (Reprise, 1974)

With Frank Sinatra and Count Basie

- It Might as Well Be Swing (Reprise, 1964)
- Sinatra at the Sands (Reprise, 1966)

With Mel Tormé

- Mel Tormé Live at the Fujitsu–Concord Festival 1990 (Concord, 1990)
- Night at the Concord Pavilion (Concord, 1990)

With Sarah Vaughan

- Dreamy (Roulette, 1960)
- The Divine One (Roulette, 1961)

With Lester Young

- Going for Myself (Verve, 1958) – rec. 1957
- Laughin' to Keep from Cryin' (Verve, 1958)

With others

- Harry Belafonte, An Evening with Belafonte (RCA Victor, 1957)
- Bob Brookmeyer and Zoot Sims, Stretching Out (United Artists, 1958)
- Hoagy Carmichael, Hoagy Sings Carmichael (Pacific Jazz, 1956)
- James Carter, Conversin' with the Elders (Atlantic, 1996)
- Dolo Coker, Third Down (Xanadu, 1977)
- Nat King Cole, After Midnight (Capitol, 1957)
- Clifford Coulter, Do It Now! (Impulse!, 1971)
- Bing Crosby and Buddy Bregman, Bing Sings Whilst Bregman Swings (Verve, 1956)
- Sammy Davis Jr, It's All Over but the Swingin' (Decca, 1957)
- Billy Eckstine, Billy's Best! (Mercury, 1958)
- Herb Ellis, Ellis in Wonderland (Verve, 1956)
- Herb Ellis and Ray Brown, Soft Shoe (Concord Jazz, 1974)
- Gil Fuller, Gil Fuller & the Monterey Jazz Festival Orchestra featuring Dizzy Gillespie (Pacific Jazz, 1965)
- Dizzy Gillespie, Jazz Recital (Norgran, 1955)
- Jimmy Giuffre, The Jimmy Giuffre Clarinet (Atlantic, 1956)
- Al Grey, Shades of Grey (Tangerine, 1965)
- Woody Herman, Songs for Hip Lovers (Verve, 1957)
- Red Holloway, Live at the Floating Jazz Festival (Chiaroscuro, 1997)
- Milt Jackson, Memphis Jackson (Impulse!, 1969)
- Illinois Jacquet, Illinois Jacquet and His Orchestra (Verve, 1956)
- Budd Johnson, Budd Johnson and the Four Brass Giants (Riverside, 1960)
- Barney Kessel, To Swing or Not to Swing (Contemporary, 1955)
- Carole King, Rhymes & Reasons (A&M 1972)
- B.B. King, Live at the Apollo (1991)
- Gene Krupa and Buddy Rich, Krupa and Rich (Clef, 1956)
- Lambert, Hendricks, & Ross, The Hottest New Group in Jazz (Columbia, 1960)
- Modern Jazz Quartet, MJQ & Friends: A 40th Anniversary Celebration (Atlantic, 1994)
- The Pointer Sisters, That's a Plenty (Blue Thumb, 1974)
- Paul Quinichette, Like Basie! (United Artists, 1959)
- Nancy Wilson, The Sound of Nancy Wilson (Capitol, 1968)
- Joe Williams, Joe Williams Live! A Swingin' Night at Birdland (Roulette, 1962)
- Teddy Wilson, Teddy Wilson & His All Stars (Chiaroscuro, 1995)
- V.A. Jazz at Santa Monica Civic '72 (Pablo, 1973)
- V.A. Jazz at the Philharmonic – Yoyogi National Stadium, Tokyo 1983: Return to Happiness (1983, Pablo)
