= Wendell Marshall =

American jazz double bassist (1920–2002)

- Born: October 24, 1920; St. Louis, Missouri, United States
- Died: February 6, 2002 (aged 81) St. Louis, Missouri, United States
- Instruments: Double bass

Wendell Lewis Marshall (October 24, 1920 – February 6, 2002) was an American jazz double-bassist.

Marshall was Jimmy Blanton's cousin. Marshall studied with the noted Ellington bassist, inheriting Blanton's bass upon his death. He attended Sumner High School and studied at Lincoln University, and in 1942 played briefly with Lionel Hampton, then served in the Army from 1943 to 1946. Following his discharge, he performed with Jimmy Forrest, Buggs Roberts, and Stuff Smith, then relocated to New York City, where he worked with Mercer Ellington. From 1948 to 1955, he performed with Duke Ellington. He made his Carnegie Hall debut with the Ellington band on November 13, 1948.

Following his time with Ellington, Marshall joined pit orchestras on Broadway, including Fiddler on the Roof and A Funny Thing Happened on the Way to the Forum. His freelance employers included Mary Lou Williams, Art Blakey, Donald Byrd, Milt Jackson, and Hank Jones among others. During 1955–56, Marshall, Hank Jones, and Kenny Clarke were the house rhythm section for Savoy Records. Marshall played on over 370 record dates, but made only one record as a leader, Wendell Marshall and the Billy Byers Orchestra.

Marshall retired from music in 1968, worked as an insurance agent and started his own insurance business in St. Louis in 1970. He died of colon cancer in 2002, aged 81.

== Discography ==
as a leader

- Wendell Marshall with the Billy Byers Orchestra (1955)

with Nat Adderley

- That's Nat (Savoy, 1955)

With Gene Ammons

- Twisting the Jug (Prestige, 1961) – with Joe Newman and Jack McDuff
- Soul Summit Vol. 2 (Prestige, 1961 [1962])
- Late Hour Special (Prestige, 1961 [1964])
- Velvet Soul (Prestige, 1961–62 [1964])
- Angel Eyes (Prestige, 1962 [1965])
- Sock! (Prestige, 1962 [1965])

With Dorothy Ashby

- The Jazz Harpist (Regent, 1957)

With Shorty Baker and Doc Cheatham

- Shorty & Doc (Swingville, 1961)

With Louis Bellson

- The Driving Louis Bellson (Norgran, 1955)

With Eddie Bert

- Musician of the Year (Savoy, 1955)

With Art Blakey

- Art Blakey Big Band (Bethlehem, 1957)
- Holiday For Skins (Blue Note, 1959)

With Kenny Burrell

- Weaver of Dreams (Columbia, 1960–61)

With Kenny Clarke

- Kenny Clarke & Ernie Wilkins (Savoy, 1955) – with Ernie Wilkins
- Klook's Clique (Savoy, 1956)

With Arnett Cobb

- Party Time (Prestige, 1959)

With Earl Coleman

- Earl Coleman Returns (Prestige, 1956)

With Eddie Costa

- Guys and Dolls Like Vibes (Coral/Verve, 1958) – with Bill Evans, Paul Motian
- The House of Blue Lights (Dot, 1959) – with Paul Motion

With Eddie "Lockjaw" Davis

- Misty (Moodsville, 1960) – with Shirley Scott
- Trane Whistle (Prestige, 1960)

With Duke Ellington

- The Duke Plays Ellington (Capitol, 1955)

With Jimmy Giuffre

- The Music Man (Atlantic, 1958)

With Grant Green

- The Latin Bit (Blue Note, 1962)

With Dodo Greene

- My Hour of Need (Blue Note, 1962) [bonus tracks]

With Tiny Grimes

- Callin' the Blues (Prestige, 1958) – with J. C. Higginbotham
- Tiny in Swingville (Swingville, 1959) – with Jerome Richardson

With Gigi Gryce

- Jazz Lab (Columbia, 1957) – with Donald Byrd
- Gigi Gryce and the Jazz Lab Quintet (Riverside, 1957)
- Modern Jazz Perspective (Columbia, 1957) – with Donald Byrd
- Doin' the Gigi (Uptown, 2011)

With Jimmy Hamilton

- It's About Time (Swingville, 1961)
- Can't Help Swinging (Swingville, 1961)

With Coleman Hawkins

- Accent on Tenor Sax (Urania, 1955)
- Soul (Prestige, 1958)
- Coleman Hawkins All Stars (Swingville, 1960) – with Joe Thomas and Vic Dickenson
- At Ease with Coleman Hawkins (Moodsville, 1960)
- Things Ain't What They Used to Be (Swingville, 1961) as part of the Prestige Swing Festival

With Johnny Hodges

- Blue Rabbit (Verve, 1964)

With Claude Hopkins

- Yes Indeed! (Swingville, 1960) with Buddy Tate and Emmett Berry
- Let's Jam (Swingville, 1961) – with Buddy Tate and Joe Thomas
- Swing Time! (Swingville, 1963) – with Budd Johnson and Vic Dickenson

With Milt Jackson

- Meet Milt Jackson (Savoy, 1956)
- Roll 'Em Bags (Savoy, 1956)
- The Jazz Skyline (Savoy, 1956)
- Jackson's Ville (Savoy, 1956)

With Willis Jackson

- Cool "Gator" (Prestige, 1959)
- Blue Gator (Prestige, 1960)
- Cookin' Sherry (Prestige, 1959–60)
- Together Again! (Prestige, 1959–60 [1965]) – with Jack McDuff
- Really Groovin' (Prestige, 1961)
- In My Solitude (Moodsville, 1961)
- Together Again, Again (Prestige, 1960 [1966]) – with Jack McDuff
- Thunderbird (Prestige, 1962)

With Illinois Jacquet

- Desert Winds (Argo, 1964)

With Bill Jennings

- Enough Said! (Prestige, 1959)
- Glide On (Prestige, 1960)

With J. J. Johnson and Kai Winding

- K + J.J. (Bethlehem, 1955)

With Lonnie Johnson

- Blues by Lonnie Johnson (Bluesville, 1960)

With Hank Jones

- The Trio (Savoy, 1955)
- Bluebird (Savoy, 1955)

With Herbie Mann

- Flute Flight (Prestige, 1957) – with Bobby Jaspar
- Flute Soufflé (Prestige, 1957) – with Bobby Jaspar
- Yardbird Suite (Savoy, 1957)

With Jack McDuff

- Brother Jack (Prestige, 1960)

With Carmen McRae

- Carmen McRae (Bethlehem, 1954)

With Gerry Mulligan

- Jazz Concerto Grosso (ABC-Paramount, 1957) – with Bob Brookmeyer and Phil Sunkel
- Two of a Mind (RCA Victor, 1962) – with Paul Desmond

With Oliver Nelson

- Meet Oliver Nelson (New Jazz, 1959)

With Joe Newman

- Joe's Hap'nin's (Swingville, 1961)

With Ike Quebec

- Soul Samba (Blue Note, 1962)

With Betty Roché

- Singin' & Swingin' (Prestige, 1960)

With Charlie Rouse and Paul Quinichette

- The Chase Is On (Bethlehem, 1958)

With Pee Wee Russell

- Swingin' with Pee Wee (Swingville, 1960) – with Buck Clayton

With A. K. Salim

- Flute Suite (Savoy, 1957) – with Frank Wess and Herbie Mann

With Shirley Scott

- Soul Searching (Prestige, 1959)

With Al Sears

- Rockin' in Rhythm (Swingville, 1960) – as The Swingville All-Stars with Taft Jordan and Hilton Jefferson
- Swing's the Thing (Swingsville, 1960)

With Hal Singer

- Blue Stompin' (Prestige, 1959) – with Charlie Shavers

With Al Smith

- Hear My Blues (Bluesville, 1959)

With Johnny "Hammond" Smith

- Gettin' the Message (Prestige, 1960)
- Stimulation (Prestige, 1961)
- Opus De Funk (Prestige, 1961 [1966])

With Sonny Stitt

- Sonny Stitt Plays (Roost, 1955)
- Sonny Stitt with the New Yorkers (Roost, 1957)

With Buddy Tate

- Tate's Date (Swingville, 1960)

With Clark Terry

- Clark Terry (EmArcy, 1955)

With Lucky Thompson

- Lucky Thompson Plays Jerome Kern and No More (Moodsville, 1963)

With Ben Webster

- Music for Loving (Norgran, 1954)

With Joe Wilder

- Wilder 'n' Wilder (Savoy, 1956)

With Ernie Wilkins

- Top Brass (Savoy, 1955)

With Lem Winchester

- Winchester Special (New Jazz, 1959)
- Lem's Beat (New Jazz, 1960)

With John Wright

- Makin' Out (Prestige, 1961)
- Mr. Soul (Prestige, 1962)

With Larry Young

- Young Blues (New Jazz, 1960)
