= J. C. Heard =

American swing, bop, and blues drummer (1917–1988)

J.C. Heard
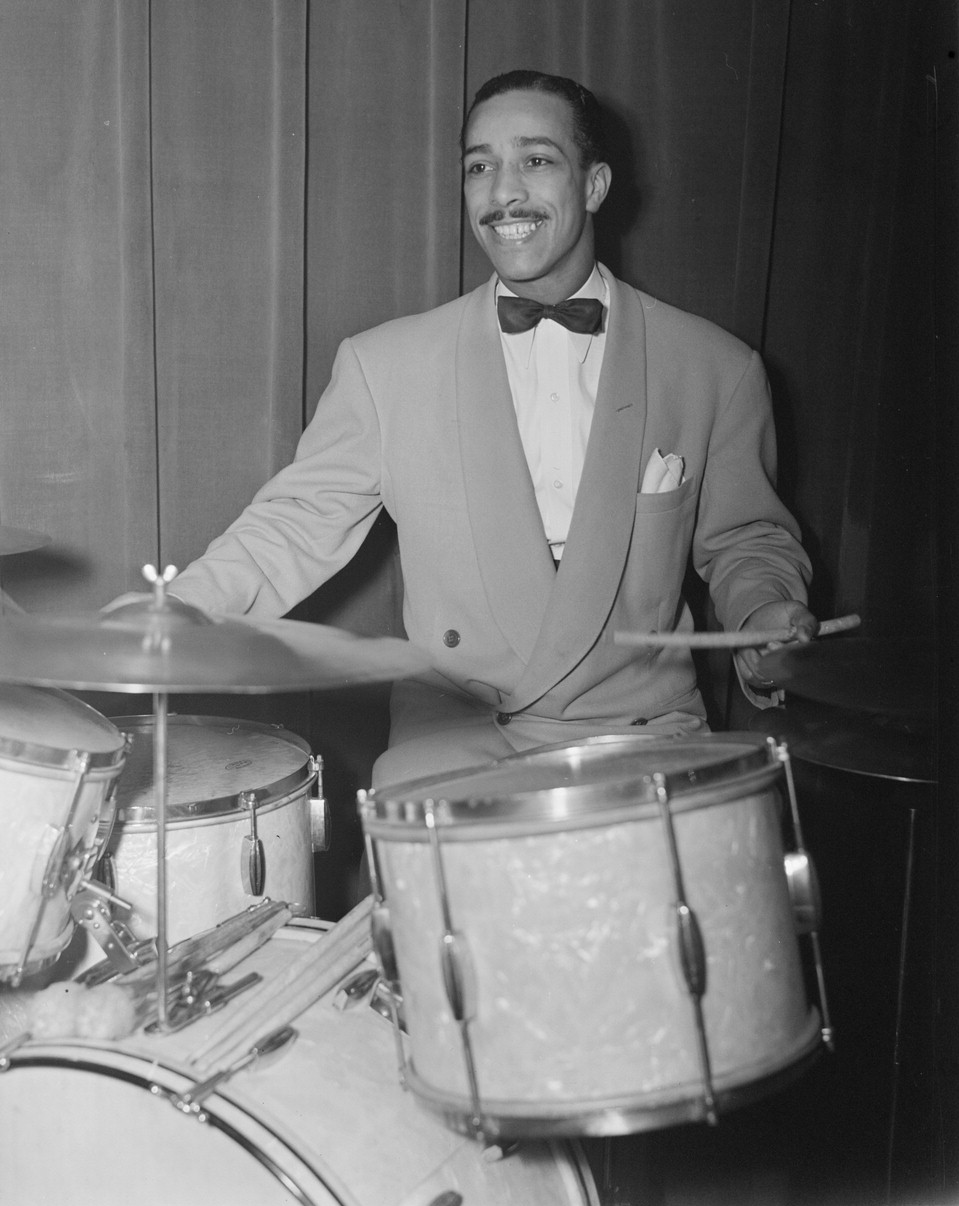
- A fanclub poster

Background information
- Born: James Charles Heard; August 10, 1917; Dayton, Ohio, United States
- Died: September 27, 1988 (aged 71) Royal Oak, Michigan
- Genres: Bebop, swing, blues
- Occupation: Musician
- Instrument: Drums
- Years active: 1939–1980s

James Charles Heard (August 10, 1917 – September 27, 1988) was an American swing, bop, and blues drummer.

== Biography ==
Heard was born in Dayton, Ohio and was raised in Detroit, Michigan. As a young child, he performed as a tap dancer in amateur contests and vaudeville shows. Around the age of 11, Heard began to switch his focus to the drums. He started out teaching himself to play, then took lessons as a student at Cass Technical High School. His parents supported his interest, and brought him to see major performers who toured to Detroit's music venues. He would later describe seeing Chick Webb play in 1937 as a formative experience.

Heard became a protege of the drummer Jo Jones, and through him would meet and sit in with Count Basie. With Jones's help, Heard gained his first professional job with Teddy Wilson's band in 1939. They played the Golden Gate Ballroom in Harlem and the Roseland Ballroom, and recorded for Columbia. After the Wilson band's breakup, he went on to perform in bands led by Benny Carter, Louis Jordan, Louis Armstrong, Benny Goodman, Duke Ellington, Woody Herman, and Dizzy Gillespie. He also performed at major jazz festivals, and played alongside Roy Eldridge and Charlie Parker.

Heard's style was a hybrid of swing and bop. He was known for his innovative techniques and the hard swing he would bring to both large and small bands. He recorded with Charles Mingus, Ray Brown, Billie Holiday, Ray Charles, Nat King Cole, Dinah Washington, Lena Horne, and Sarah Vaughan. He also led his own bands, including a quintet that played at Café Society and a trio with Erroll Garner and Oscar Pettiford. Heard performed as a featured member of Cab Calloway's band from 1942-1945. As a member of the Calloway band, he appeared in several Hollywood films, including Stormy Weather (1943).

Heard toured with Norman Granz's Jazz at the Philharmonic in the 1950s. After a successful engagement in Japan in 1953, he remained in the country for several years to perform and teach. He became a mentor to young musicians like Izumi Yukimura, George Kawaguchi and Franky Sakai. He also met and married his wife Hiroko while living in Japan.

After returning to New York in 1957, Heard played with the Coleman Hawkins-Roy Eldridge Quintet and with Teddy Wilson's trio. In 1966, he moved to Detroit where he was a bandleader and a mentor to younger musicians. In 1983, he again recorded an album as leader, accompanied by saxophonist George Benson, pianist Claude Black, and Dave Young on bass. In 1981, Heard started a 13-piece big band which played around the state and at festivals, often featuring Dizzy Gillespie and other colleagues. This group recorded in 1986 and continued performing regularly until his death.

Heard died of a heart attack at the age of 71 in Royal Oak, Michigan. His legacy is honored with the yearly J.C. Heard JazzWeek@Wayne, held on the campus of Wayne State University, as part of the Detroit Jazz Festival.

== Discography ==
=== As leader/co-leader ===
- 1956: Calypso For Dancing (Philips (Australia))
- 1958: This is Me, J. C. Heard (Argo)
- 1964: Live At The Lighthouse 1964 (Fresh Sound) with Bill Perkins
- 1983: The Detroit Jazz Tradition - Alive & Well (Parkwood)
- 1986: Some of This, Some of That! - JC Heard Orchestra (Hiroko)
- 1988: Mr. B. with J.C. Heard - Partners in Time - with George Benson (Blind Pig Records)
- 1980s: J.C. Heard Featuring Charlie Gabriel and Friends (Gabriel Historical Society)

=== As sideman ===
With Toshiko Akiyoshi

- Toshiko's Piano (Norgaran, 1953)

With Gene Ammons

- Nice an' Cool (Moodsville, 1961)
- Jug (Prestige, 1961)

With Shorty Baker and Doc Cheatham

- Shorty & Doc (Swingville, 1961)

With Benny Carter

- Cosmopolite (Norgran, 1952 [1955])

With Doc Cheatham

- Hey Doc! (Black & Blue, 1975)

With Arnett Cobb

- Sizzlin' (Prestige, 1960)
- Ballads by Cobb (Moodsvile, 1960)

With Roy Eldridge

- Rockin' Chair (Clef, 1951)

With Bud Freeman

- The Bud Freeman All-Stars featuring Shorty Baker (Swingville, 1960) with Shorty Baker

With Dizzy Gillespie

- Dizzy Gillespie and Stuff Smith (Verve, 1957)
- Sittin' In (Verve, 1957)

With Al Grey

- Al Grey Featuring Arnett Cobb (Black & Blue, 1977)

With Norman Granz

- Norman Granz' Jam Session, #1 (Clef MGC 601) this and the following album features Benny Carter, Johnny Hodges, Charlie Parker, Ben Webster and others
- Norman Granz' Jam Session, #2 (Clef MGC 602)

With Johnny Hodges

- In a Tender Mood (Norgran, 1952 [1955])
- The Blues (Norgran, 1952–54, [1955])

With Claude Hopkins

- Let's Jam (Swingville, 1961) with Buddy Tate and Joe Thomas

With Illinois Jacquet

- Illinois Jacquet Quartet (Storyville, 1978)
- God Bless My Solo (Black & Blue, 1978)

With Ellis Larkins

- A Smooth One (Black & Blue, 1977)

With Howard McGhee

- Howard McGhee and Milt Jackson (Savoy, 1948 [1955])

With Oscar Peterson

- JATP Lausanne 1953 (TCB 02152, 1953)
- Lausanne 1953 (TCB 02162, 1953)

With Sammy Price

- Fire (Black & Blue, 1975)
- Rockin' Boogie (Black & Blue, 1975)

With Ike Quebec

- Ike Quebec 1944-1946 (Classics)

With Al Sears

- Things Ain't What They Used to Be (Swingville, 1961) as part of the Prestige Swing Festival

With Sir Charles Thompson

- Sir Charles Thompson And The Swing Organ (Columbia, 1959)

With Mary Lou Williams

- The Zodiac Suite (Vintage Jazz Classics, 1945)

With Teddy Wilson

- Piano Moods (Columbia, 1950) – majority of tracks
- Soft Moods (Clef, 1953)

With John Wright

- Nice 'n' Tasty (Prestige, 1961)

With Lester Young

- Lester Young with the Oscar Peterson Trio (Norgran, 1952)
