= Blues & Ballads =

Studio album by Lonnie Johnson with Elmer Snowden
- Released: 1960
- Recorded: April 5, 1960
- Studio: Van Gelder Studio, Englewood Cliffs, NJ
- Genre: Blues
- Length: 43:25
- Label: Bluesville
- Producer: Chris Albertson

Lonnie Johnson chronology
| Blues by Lonnie Johnson (1960) | Blues & Ballads (1960) | Losing Game (1961) |

Professional ratings
Review scores
| Source | Rating |
|---|---|
| AllMusic | 5/5 stars |
| The Penguin Guide to Blues Recordings | 3/4 stars |
| DownBeat | 4.5/5 stars |

Blues & Ballads is a 1960 recording featuring Lonnie Johnson on vocals and electric guitar accompanied by Elmer Snowden on acoustic guitar and Wendell Marshall on bass. This was the first commercial recording by Snowden in 26 years. The same ensemble, under the supervision of Chris Albertson, recorded a second volume, Blues, Ballads, and Jumpin' Jazz, released in 1990.

== Reception ==
The album has generally received high acclaim. Although one writer appears to disregard the album with a single sentence, calling it "just plain sad, lacking even the vitality of rock and roll." Others have noted Johnson's "plaintive, slightly nasal voice" and indicated that he "sings smooth blues and sentimental ballads with equal skill." The guitarists styles are described as distinctive, yet complementary, and Snowden is described as a "sympathetic accompanist" with "an easy swingingly graceful style."

One reviewer calls Johnson's performance on the blues numbers "convincing, affecting interpretations," but indicates that his performance on the three ballads is less consistent. He states, "On 'Memories of You', his approach is gentle and lyrical, and yet his controlled inner tension builds tremendous emotional power. Two other ballads, his own compositions are too stickily sentimental to be effective."

Referring to an LP/digital audiophile reissue a quarter century after the sessions, a critic maintains that "far from getting propped up with choice backing, Johnson doesn’t disappoint here. Certain voices will reliably say that Johnson’s not as sharp as his younger self, but the clarity of the recording, engineered by Rudy Van Gelder, more than compensates for any slippage, and it’s honestly not easy to discern that Johnson’s slipped all that much."

== Track listing ==
1. "Haunted House" (Lonnie Johnson) – 4:59
2. "Memories of You" (Eubie Blake, Andy Razaf) – 4:21
3. "Blues for Chris" (Chris Albertson, Elmer Snowden) – 5:04
4. "I Found a Dream" (Lonnie Johnson) – 4:33
5. "St. Louis Blues" (W.C. Handy) – 3:05
6. "I'll Get Along Somehow" (Buddy Fields, Gerald Marks) – 4:27
7. "Savoy Blues" (Kid Ory) – 4:11
8. "Backwater Blues" (Bessie Smith) – 5:04
9. "Elmer's Blues" (Elmer Snowden) – 3:27
10. "He's a Jelly Roll Baker" (Lonnie Johnson) – 4:14

== Personnel ==
=== Musicians ===
- Lonnie Johnson – electric guitar, vocals
- Elmer Snowden – acoustic guitar
- Wendell Marshall – bass

=== Technical personnel ===
- Chris Albertson – producer, liner notes
- Rudy Van Gelder – engineer
- Kirk Felton – digital remastering
  - 1990 Fantasy Studios, Berkeley

== Release history ==
| year | format | label | catalog # |
|---|---|---|---|
| 1960 | LP | Prestige Bluesville | Bv-1011 |
| 1960 | | Bluesville/Original Blues Classics | OBCCD-531-2 (BV) |
| | CD | Bluesville/Original Blues Classics | OBCCD-531-2 |
| | LP | Bluesville/Original Blues Classics | OBC-531 |
| | CD | Bluesville/Original Blues Classics | 531 |
| 1991 | CD | Obc | 531 |
| 1993 | CD | Ace | 531 |
| | LP | Fan/Obc | 531 |
