= Idle Hours (album) =

Studio album by Lonnie Johnson with Victoria Spivey
- Released: 1961
- Recorded: July 13, 1961
- Studio: Van Gelder Studio, Englewood Cliffs, NJ
- Genre: Blues
- Length: 40:43
- Label: Bluesville; BVLP 1044
- Producer: Chris Albertson

Lonnie Johnson chronology
Losing Game (1961)	Idle Hours (1961)	Another Night to Cry (1962)

Victoria Spivey chronology
Idle Hours (1961)	Songs We Taught Your Mother (1962)

Idle Hours is an album by blues musicians Lonnie Johnson and Victoria Spivey, recorded in 1962 and released on the Bluesville label.

== Reception ==
Professional ratings
Review scores
Source	Rating
AllMusic	4/5 stars
The Penguin Guide to Blues Recordings	3/4 stars
The Rolling Stone Album Guide	4/5 stars

AllMusic reviewer Bill Dahl stated: "Johnson and Victoria Spivey had known one another for decades, so it's no surprise that their musical repartee on 1961's Idle Hours seems so natural and playful".

== Track listing ==
All compositions by Lonnie Johnson except where noted

1. "Darling, I Miss You So" – 3:23
2. "Long Time Blues" – 4:35
3. "You Are My Life" – 3:38
4. "Oh Yes Baby" – 2:43
5. "Please Baby" – 2:52
6. "Leave Me or Love Me" – 2:57
7. "Idle Hours" (Spivey) – 3:30
8. "You Have No Love in Your Heart" – 3:51
9. "Good Luck Darling" – 3:20
10. "No More Cryin'" – 3:35
11. "I Got the Blues So Bad" (Spivey) – 3:03
12. "End It All" – 3:16

== Personnel ==
=== Performance ===
- Lonnie Johnson – guitar, vocals (tracks 1–10 & 12)
- Victoria Spivey – vocals, piano (tracks 2, 7 & 11)
- Cliff Jackson – piano (tracks 1–8, 10 & 12)

=== Production ===
- Chris Albertson – supervision
- Rudy Van Gelder – engineer
