= Swing's the Thing =

Swing's the Thing may refer to:

- Swing's the Thing (Illinois Jacquet album), 1957
- Swing's the Thing (Al Sears album), 1961
