= French Cookin' =

French Cookin' may refer to:

- French Cookin' (Stephanie Nakasian album)
- French Cookin' (Budd Johnson album)

== See also ==
- French cooking
