= Mr. Soul (disambiguation) =

"Mr. Soul" is a song recorded by Buffalo Springfield.

Mr. Soul may also refer to:

- Mr. Soul (Sam Cooke album)
- Mr. Soul (John Wright album)
- Mr. Soul!, a 2018 documentary film
