= Shorty & Doc =

Studio album by Shorty Baker and Doc Cheatham
- Released: 1961
- Recorded: January 17, 1961
- Studio: Van Gelder Studio, Englewood Cliffs, NJ
- Genre: Jazz
- Length: 43:05
- Label: Swingville; SVLP 2021
- Producer: Esmond Edwards

Shorty Baker chronology
The Bud Freeman All-Stars featuring Shorty Baker (1960)	Shorty & Doc (1961)

Shorty & Doc is an album by trumpeters Shorty Baker and Doc Cheatham recorded in 1961 and originally released on the Swingville label.

== Reception ==
Professional ratings
Review scores
Source	Rating
AllMusic	4/5 stars
The Penguin Guide to Jazz Recordings	3/4 stars

AllMusic awarded the album 4 stars and the review by Scott Yanow stated "The results of this meeting are generally quite friendly rather than combative with Cheatham's Dixielandish phrasing sounding slightly old-fashioned next to Baker. They perform appealing swing-oriented material and sound fine in their many tradeoffs".

== Track listing ==
1. "Chitlin's" (Esmond Edwards) – 10:55
2. "I Didn't Know What Time It Was" (Richard Rodgers, Lorenz Hart) – 5:13
3. "Baker's Dozen" (Shorty Baker) – 4:53
4. "Good Queen Bess" (Johnny Hodges) – 7:38
5. "Night Train" (Jimmy Forrest) – 6:39
6. "Lullabye in Rhythm" (Benny Goodman, Edgar Sampson, Clarence Profit, Walter Hirsch) – 7:35

== Personnel ==
- Shorty Baker, Doc Cheatham – trumpet
- Walter Bishop Jr. – piano
- Wendell Marshall – bass
- J. C. Heard – drums
