= Blues by Lonnie Johnson =

Studio album by Lonnie Johnson
- Released: 1960
- Recorded: March 8, 1960
- Studio: Van Gelder Studio, Englewood Cliffs, NJ
- Genre: Blues
- Length: 38:05
- Label: Bluesville; BVLP 1007
- Producer: Chris Albertson

Lonnie Johnson chronology
Blues by Lonnie Johnson (1960)	Blues & Ballads (1961)

Blues by Lonnie Johnson is an album by blues musician Lonnie Johnson, recorded in 1960 and released on the Bluesville label.

== Reception ==
Professional ratings
Review scores
Source	Rating
AllMusic	4/5 stars
The Penguin Guide to Blues Recordings	2.5/4 stars
The Rolling Stone Album Guide	3/5 stars

AllMusic reviewer Scott Yanow stated: "After four years off records and in obscurity, Lonnie Johnson launched his final comeback with this release ... Johnson sings and plays guitar on a variety of blues, showing that the layoff (he was working at the time as a janitor) had not hurt his abilities in the slightest".

== Track listing ==
All compositions by Lonnie Johnson

1. "Don't Ever Love" – 3:33
2. "No Love for Sale" – 3:02
3. "There's No Love" – 2:25
4. "I Don't Hurt Anymore" – 3:53
5. "She-Devil" – 2:53
6. "One-Sided Love Affair" – 3:12
7. "Big Leg Woman" – 3:11
8. "There Must Be a Way" – 3:23
9. "She's Drunk Again" – 3:21
10. "Blues 'Round My Door" – 3:33
11. "You Don't Move Me" – 2:12
12. "You Will Need Me" – 3:27

== Personnel ==
=== Performance ===
- Lonnie Johnson – guitar, vocals
- Hal Singer – tenor saxophone
- Claude Hopkins – piano
- Wendell Marshall – bass
- Bobby Donaldson – drums

=== Production ===
- Chris Albertson – supervision
- Rudy Van Gelder – engineer
