= Things Ain't What They Used to Be (Prestige Swing Festival album) =

Studio album by The First Annual Prestige Swing Festival
- Released: 1961
- Recorded: April 14 and May 19, 1961
- Studio: Van Gelder Studio, Englewood Cliffs, NJ
- Genre: Jazz
- Length: 79:00
- Label: Swingville; SV 4001 (SVLP 2024/25)
- Producer: Esmond Edwards

Coleman Hawkins chronology
| The Hawk Relaxes (1961) | Things Ain't What They Used to Be (1961) | Good Old Broadway (1962) |

Al Sears chronology
| Swing's the Thing (1961) | Things Ain't What They Used to Be (1961) |

Jimmy Hamilton chronology
| Can't Help Swinging (1961) | Things Ain't What They Used to Be (1961) | Clarinet Summit (1984) |

Single LP Cover

Years Ago Cover

Things Ain't What They Used to Be is an album by the First Annual Prestige Swing Festival featuring two all-star groups, one including Coleman Hawkins, Hilton Jefferson, Jimmy Hamilton and Joe Newman and the other led by Al Sears with Buddy Tate, Pee Wee Russell and Joe Thomas. It was recorded in 1961 and first released on the Swingville label as a double album before being reissued as two single discs with Hawkins's name displayed prominently: Things Ain't What They Used to Be and Years Ago. All tracks were also reissued as Jam Session in Swingville which was credited to Hawkins and Russell.

== Reception ==
Professional ratings
Review scores
| Source | Rating |
|---|---|
| AllMusic | 3/5 stars |

The AllMusic review by Scott Yanow states: "The music, which is performed by two all-star groups with arrangements by either Jimmy Hamilton or Al Sears, is generally modern swing ... Nothing all that memorable or innovative occurs, but the performances are enjoyable".

== Track listing ==
Disc One: Things Ain't What They Used to Be (SVLP 2024)

1. "Things Ain't What They Used to Be" (Mercer Ellington, Ted Persons) – 6:48
2. "Spring's Swing" (Vivian Hamilton) – 7:55
3. "Phoenix" (Al Sears) – 7:16
4. "Love Me or Leave Me" (Walter Donaldson, Gus Kahn) – 7:16
5. "I May Be Wrong But I Think You're Wonderful" (Henry Sullivan, Harry Ruskin) – 6:33
6. "Vic's Spot" (Vic Dickenson) – 3:56

Disc Two: Years Ago (SVLP 2025)

1. "So Glad" (Al Sears) – 5:33
2. "Cool Sunrise" (Esmond Edwards) – 10:41
3. "I Want to Be Happy" (Vincent Youmans, Irving Caesar) – 2:44
4. "Jammin' in Swingville" (Hamilton) – 9:32
5. "Years Ago" (Dan Jones) 10:02

== Personnel ==
Disc One, tracks 2 & 4 and Disc Two, tracks 2 & 4

- Coleman Hawkins – tenor saxophone
- Jimmy Hamilton – clarinet, arranger
- Joe Newman – trumpet
- J. C. Higginbotham – trombone
- Hilton Jefferson – alto saxophone
- Claude Hopkins – piano
- Tiny Grimes – guitar
- Wendell Marshall – bass
- Billy English – drums

Disc One, tracks 1, 3, 5 & 6 and Disc Two, tracks 1 & 5

- Al Sears – tenor saxophone, arranger
- Joe Thomas – trumpet
- Vic Dickenson – trombone
- Pee Wee Russell – clarinet
- Buddy Tate – tenor saxophone
- Cliff Jackson – piano
- Danny Barker – guitar
- Joe Benjamin – bass
- J. C. Heard – drums

Disc Two, track 3

- Cliff Jackson – piano
- Joe Benjamin – bass
- J. C. Heard – drums
