= Nice 'n' Tasty =

Studio album by John Wright Trio
- Released: 1961
- Recorded: November 8, 1960
- Studio: Van Gelder Studio, Englewood Cliffs, New Jersey
- Genre: Jazz
- Length: 40:16
- Label: Prestige; PRLP 7197
- Producer: Esmond Edwards

John Wright chronology
South Side Soul (1960)	Nice 'n' Tasty (1961)	Makin' Out (1961)

Nice 'n' Tasty is an album by jazz pianist John Wright which was recorded in 1960 and released on the Prestige label.

== Reception ==
Professional ratings
Review scores
Source	Rating
AllMusic	3/5 stars
DownBeat	4/5 stars

The contemporaneous DownBeat reviewer wrote of Wright's playing: "while there are a couple of things in the Gospel-ly vein ('Yes, I Know'; 'Pie Face'), they are less impressive than his handling of a standard such as 'Witchcraft', or of Adderley's 'Things Are Getting Better'".

== Track listing ==
All compositions by John Wright, except where indicated.

1. "Things Are Getting Better" (Julian Adderley) – 3:43
2. "The Very Thought of You" (Ray Noble) – 6:15
3. "Witchcraft" (Cy Coleman, Carolyn Leigh) – 5:25
4. "Pie Face" – 5:08
5. "You Do It" – 5:47
6. "Darn That Dream" (Jimmy Van Heusen, Eddie DeLange) – 5:42
7. "The Wright Way" – 4:00
8. "Yes I Know" – 4:16

== Personnel ==
=== Performers ===
- John Wright - piano
- Wendell Marshall - bass
- J. C. Heard - drums

=== Production ===
- Esmond Edwards – supervision
- Rudy Van Gelder – engineer
