= Ya! Ya! =

Studio album by Budd Johnson
- Released: 1964
- Recorded: January 20–21, 1964
- Studio: Sound Makers Studio, NYC
- Genre: Jazz
- Label: Argo; LP/LPS-736
- Producer: Esmond Edwards

Budd Johnson chronology
French Cookin' (1963)	Ya! Ya! (1964)	Off the Wall (1964)

Ya! Ya! is an album by saxophonist Budd Johnson which was recorded in early 1964 and released on the Argo label.

== Track listing ==
All compositions by Budd Johnson except where noted.

1. "Ya! Ya!" – 5:19
2. "Come Rain or Come Shine" (Harold Arlen, Johnny Mercer) – 4:09
3. "Big Al" – 2:00
4. "Exotique" (Esmond Edwards) – 4:08
5. "The Revolution" – 3:46
6. "Tag Along with Me" – 2:38
7. "Chloe" (Neil Moret, Gus Kahn) – 3:46
8. "When Hearts Are Young" (Sigmund Romberg, Al Goodman, Cyrus Wood) – 4:10
9. "Where It's At" (E. Herbert) – 3:54

== Personnel ==
- Budd Johnson – tenor saxophone
- Al Williams – organ
- Richard Davis (tracks 3–5, 8 & 9), George Duvivier (tracks 1, 2, 6 & 7) – bass
- Belton Evans – drums
