= Yes Indeed! (Claude Hopkins album) =

Studio album by Claude Hopkins with Buddy Tate and Emmett Berry
- Released: 1960
- Recorded: March 25, 1960
- Studio: Van Gelder Studio, Englewood Cliffs, NJ
- Genre: Jazz
- Length: 38:39
- Label: Swingville; SVLP 2009
- Producer: Esmond Edwards

Claude Hopkins chronology
Music of the Early Jazz Dances (1958)	Yes Indeed! (1960)	Let's Jam (1961)

Yes Indeed! is an album by pianist Claude Hopkins with saxophonist Buddy Tate and trumpeter Emmett Berry recorded in 1960 and originally released by the Swingville label.

Professional ratings
Review scores
Source	Rating
AllMusic	3/5 stars

== Track listing ==
1. "It Don't Mean a Thing" (Duke Ellington, Irving Mills) – 5:35
2. "Willow Weep for Me" (Ann Ronell) – 7:21
3. "Yes, Indeed" (Sy Oliver) – 7:01
4. "Is It So" (Claude Hopkins, Osie Johnson) – 4:22
5. "Empty Bed Blues" (J. C. Johnson) – 6:27
6. "What Is This Thing Called Love?" (Cole Porter) – 3:26
7. "Mornin' Glory" (Ellington) – 4:27

== Personnel ==
- Claude Hopkins – piano
- Buddy Tate – tenor saxophone
- Emmett Berry – trumpet
- Wendell Marshall – bass
- Osie Johnson – drums
