= Let's Jam =

Studio album by Claude Hopkins with Buddy Tate and Joe Thomas
- Released: 1961
- Recorded: February 21, 1961
- Studio: Van Gelder Studio, Englewood Cliffs, NJ
- Genre: Jazz
- Length: 34:38
- Label: Swingville; SVLP 2020
- Producer: Esmond Edwards

Claude Hopkins chronology
Yes Indeed! (1960)	Let's Jam (1961)	Swing Time! (1963)

Let's Jam is an album by pianist Claude Hopkins with saxophonist Buddy Tate and trumpeter Joe Thomas recorded in 1961 and originally released by the Swingville label.

Professional ratings
Review scores
Source	Rating
AllMusic	3/5 stars

== Track listing ==
All compositions by Claude Hopkins except where noted

1. "Offbeat Blues" – 4:59
2. "Safari Stomp" – 5:43
3. "Late Evening" (Hopkins, Esmond Edwards) – 6:33
4. "The Way You Look Tonight" (Jerome Kern, Dorothy Fields) – 5:14
5. "I Apologise" (Al Hoffman, Al Goodhart, Ed Nelson) – 3:47
6. "I Surrender Dear" (Harry Barris, Gordon Clifford) – 4:23
7. "I Would Do Anything for You" (Hopkins, Alex Hill) – 3:59

== Personnel ==
- Claude Hopkins – piano
- Buddy Tate – tenor saxophone, clarinet
- Joe Thomas – trumpet
- Wendell Marshall – bass
- J. C. Heard – drums
