= South Side Soul =

Studio album by John Wright Trio
- Released: 1960
- Recorded: August 30, 1960
- Studio: Van Gelder Studio, Englewood Cliffs, New Jersey
- Genre: Jazz
- Length: 36:06
- Label: Prestige; PRLP 7190
- Producer: Esmond Edwards

John Wright chronology
South Side Soul (1960)	Nice 'n' Tasty (1961)

South Side Soul is the debut album by jazz pianist John Wright which was recorded in 1960 and released on the Prestige label.

== Reception ==
Professional ratings
Review scores
Source	Rating
AllMusic	4/5 stars
The Penguin Guide to Jazz Recordings	3/4 stars

Scott Yanow, reviewing this record for AllMusic, states: "John Wright, who is now quite obscure, recorded five albums during 1960-62 that emphasized the soulful side of hard bop. [...] Wright performs seven of his originals, all of which have something to do with Chicago. [...] Wright plays soulfully while swinging."

== Track listing ==
1. "South Side Soul" (Esmond Edwards) – 5:02
2. "47th and Calumet" (John Wright) – 3:57
3. "La Salle St After Hours" (Armond Jackson) – 5:21
4. "63rd and Cottage Grove" (Wright) – 4:06
5. "35th St Blues" (Wendell Roberts) – 7:00
6. "Sin Corner" (Jackson) – 5:30
7. "Amen Corner" (Roberts) – 5:30

== Personnel ==
=== Performance ===
- John Wright - piano
- Wendell Roberts - bass
- Walter McCants - drums

=== Production ===
- Esmond Edwards – supervision
- Rudy Van Gelder – engineer
