= Rockin' in Rhythm (Swingville All-Stars album) =

Studio album by The Swingville All Stars
- Released: 1960
- Recorded: March 31, 1960
- Studio: Van Gelder Studio, Englewood Cliffs, NJ
- Genre: Jazz
- Length: 35:48
- Label: Swingville; SVLP 2010
- Producer: The Sound of America

Al Sears chronology
Dance Music with a Swing Beat (1960)	Rockin' in Rhythm (1960)	Swing's the Thing (1961)

Rockin' in Rhythm is an album by The Swingville All-Stars nominally led by saxophonists Al Sears and Hilton Jefferson and trumpeter Taft Jordan recorded in 1960 and originally released on the Swingville label.

Professional ratings
Review scores
Source	Rating
AllMusic	3/5 stars

== Track listing ==
1. "Things Ain't What They Used to Be" (Mercer Ellington, Ted Persons) – 6:06
2. "Li'l Darling" (Neal Hefti) – 6:36
3. "Tenderly" (Walter Gross, Jack Lawrence) – 4:58
4. "New Carnegie Blues" (Al Sears) – 5:41
5. "Rockin' in Rhythm" (Duke Ellington) – 4:16
6. "Willow Weep for Me" (Ann Ronell) – 7:11

== Personnel ==
- Al Sears – tenor saxophone
- Taft Jordan – trumpet
- Hilton Jefferson – alto saxophone
- Don Abney – piano
- Wendell Marshall – bass
- Gus Johnson – drums
