= Off the Wall (Budd Johnson album) =

Studio album by Budd Johnson with Joe Newman
- Released: 1965
- Recorded: December 3, 1964
- Studio: RCA Recording Studios, NYC
- Genre: Jazz
- Length: 38:01
- Label: Argo; LP/LPS-748
- Producer: Esmond Edwards

Budd Johnson chronology
Ya! Ya! (1963)	Off the Wall (1965)	Ya! Ya! (1970)

Off the Wall is an album by saxophonist Budd Johnson with trumpeter Joe Newman which was recorded in late 1964 and released on the Argo label.

Professional ratings
Review scores
Source	Rating
AllMusic	2/5 stars

== Track listing ==
1. "Off the Wall" (Budd Johnson) – 5:05
2. "The Folks Who Live on the Hill" (Jerome Kern, Oscar Hammerstein II) – 5:17
3. "Love Is the Sweetest Thing" (Ray Noble) – 7:24
4. "Strange Music" (Robert Wright, George Forrest) – 3:57
5. "Baubles, Bangles, & Beads" (Alexander Borodin, Wright, Forrest) – 6:05
6. "Ill Wind" (Harold Arlen, Ted Koehler) – 5:04
7. "Playin' My Hunch" (Johnson) – 5:09

== Personnel ==
- Budd Johnson – tenor saxophone
- Joe Newman – trumpet
- Albert Dailey – piano
- Richard Davis (tracks 1, 2, 6 & 7), George Duvivier (tracks 3–5) – bass
- Grady Tate – drums
