= Beg, Borrow or Steal (musical) =

- Music: Leon Pober
- Lyrics: Bud Freeman
- Book: Bud Freeman
- Basis: a story by Marvin Seiger
- Productions: 1960 Broadway

Beg, Borrow or Steal is a musical with a book and lyrics by Bud Freeman, music by Leon Pober, and is based on Steal–A Disc Jockey′s Handbook, a story by Marvin Seiger and Bud Freeman. The musical is set in a run-down section of an American city in the 1950s. It ran for five performances on Broadway in 1960.

== Overview ==
The musical tells the story of urban beatniks in a fictional American city in 1950.

== Production ==
The musical opened on Broadway on February 10, 1960, at the Martin Beck Theatre, and closed on February 13, 1960, after 5 performances. Before arriving on Broadway, it operated under the working title of Clara.

The original director, Billy Matthews, was replaced by actor David Doyle but was given "staged by" credit. The music director was Hal Hidey, and the choreographer was Peter Hamilton. Scenery, costumes, and lighting were all designed by Carter Morningstar. The cast included Estelle Parsons, Eddie Bracken, Betty Garrett, Larry Parks, and Biff McGuire, along with Doyle.

== Song list ==
Source: Internet Broadway database

Act I

- "Some Little People" - The Ensemble
- "Rootless" - Junior
- "What Are We Gonna Do Tonight?" - Ollie, Phil and Judy
- "Poetry and All That Jazz" - Freida and Ensemble
- "Don't Stand Too Close to the Picture" - Rafe, Clara and Ensemble
- "Beg, Borrow or Steal (Recitative)" - Rafe
- "Beg, Borrow or Steal" - Rafe
- "No One Knows Me" - Clara
- "Zen Is When" - Pistol, Junior, Ethel and Jason
- "Clara" - Junior
- "You've Got Someting To Say" - Rafe and Clara
- "You've Got Someting To Say (Reprise)" - Rafe, Clara, Pistol, Junior and Company

Act II

- "Presenting Clara Spencer" - Clara, Knitter, Chess Players, Sculptor, Flamenco Dancer and Members of the Dance Class
- "I Can't Stop Talking" - Clara and Junior
- "It's All in Your Mind" - Rafe and Clara
- "In Time" - Junior
- "Think" - Clara
- "Little People (Song and Dance)" - Pistol and Company
- "Rafesville, U.S.A." - Ethel and Jason
- "Beg, Borrow or Steal (Reprise)" - Rafe and Ensemble
- "Let's Be Strangers Again" - Clara and Junior
- "Little People (Reprise)" - The Entire Company

== Recordings ==
Before the Broadway opening, a studio recording (under the name of Clara) was recorded in 1960. Betty Garrett was featured on the album, along with Jimmie Komack, Sid Tomack, and Johnny Standley.
