= Losing Game =

Studio album by Lonnie Johnson
- Released: 1961
- Recorded: December 28, 1960
- Studio: Van Gelder Studio, Englewood Cliffs, NJ
- Genre: Blues
- Length: 35:33
- Label: Bluesville; BVLP 1024
- Producer: Esmond Edwards

Lonnie Johnson chronology
Blues & Ballads (1960)	Losing Game (1961)	Idle Hours (1961)

Losing Game is an album by blues musician Lonnie Johnson, recorded in 1961 and released on the Bluesville label.

== Reception ==
Professional ratings
Review scores
Source	Rating
AllMusic	4/5 stars
The Penguin Guide to Blues Recordings	3/4 stars
The Rolling Stone Album Guide	4/5 stars

AllMusic reviewer Bill Dahl wrote that "this 1960 set is a typically gorgeous solo outing that ranges from torchy standards of the Tin Pan Alley species to bluesier pursuits of his own creation".

== Track listing ==
All compositions by Lonnie Johnson except where noted

1. "New Orleans Blues" – 2:24
2. "My Little Kitten Susie" – 2:38
3. "Evil Woman" – 2:30
4. "What a Diff'rence a Day Makes" (María Grever, Stanley Adams) – 2:29
5. "Moanin' Blues" – 3:59
6. "Summertime" (George Gershwin, Ira Gershwin, DuBose Heyward) – 3:27
7. "Lines in My Face" – 2:50
8. "Losing Game" – 1:52
9. "New Year's Blues" – 2:17
10. "Slow and Easy" – 4:18
11. "Four Walls and Me" – 3:45
12. "You Won't Let Me Go" (Buddy Johnson) – 3:04

== Personnel ==
=== Performance ===
- Lonnie Johnson – guitar, piano, vocals

=== Production ===
- Esmond Edwards – supervision
- Rudy Van Gelder – engineer
