= Coleman Hawkins All Stars =

Studio album by Coleman Hawkins featuring Joe Thomas and Vic Dickenson
- Released: 1960
- Recorded: January 8, 1960
- Studio: Van Gelder, Englewood Cliffs, New Jersey
- Genre: Jazz
- Length: 42:19
- Label: Swingville; SV 2005
- Producer: Esmond Edwards

Coleman Hawkins chronology
Coleman Hawkins with the Red Garland Trio (1959)	Coleman Hawkins All Stars (1960)	At Ease with Coleman Hawkins (1960)

Coleman Hawkins All Stars is an album by saxophonist Coleman Hawkins featuring trumpeter Joe Thomas and trombonist Vic Dickenson which was recorded in 1960 and released on the Swingville label.

== Reception ==
Professional ratings
Review scores
Source	Rating
Allmusic	3/5 stars

Scott Yanow of Allmusic states, "Hawkins proves again and again why his sound is not only the epitome of jazz, but forever timeless... The demonstrative yet subtle Hawkins is in full flight here, with the equally elegant Thomas and naturally subdued Dickenson in lock step.".

== Track listing ==
1. "You Blew Out the Flame in My Heart" (Ervin Drake, Johnny Hodges, Jimmy Shirl) – 5:58
2. "More Bounce to the Vonce" (Osie Johnson) – 9:00
3. "I'm Beginning to See the Light" (Duke Ellington, Don George, Johnny Hodges, Harry James) – 6:55
4. "Cool Blues" (Jerry Valentine) – 8:10
5. "Some Stretching" (Coleman Hawkins, Osie Johnson) – 12:16

== Personnel ==
- Coleman Hawkins – tenor saxophone
- Joe Thomas – trumpet
- Vic Dickenson – trombone
- Tommy Flanagan – piano
- Wendell Marshall – bass
- Osie Johnson – drums, tambourine
