= Makin' Out (album) =

Studio album by John Wright
- Released: 1961
- Recorded: June 23, 1961
- Studio: Van Gelder Studio, Englewood Cliffs, New Jersey
- Genre: Jazz
- Length: 40:16
- Label: Prestige; PRLP 7212
- Producer: Esmond Edwards

John Wright chronology
Nice 'n' Tasty (1961)	Makin' Out (1961)	Mr. Soul (1962)

Makin' Out is an album by jazz pianist John Wright. The album was recorded in 1961 and released on the Prestige label.

Professional ratings
Review scores
Source	Rating
AllMusic	3/5 stars

== Track listing ==
All compositions by John Wright, except where indicated.

1. "Makin' Out" (John Wright, Eddie Williams) – 4:54
2. "Like Someone in Love" (Jimmy Van Heusen, Johnny Burke) – 4:31
3. "Back in Jersey" (Wright, Williams) – 4:13
4. "Sparkie" (Williams) – 4:37
5. "*Soul Search" (Williams) – 4:33
6. "It Could Happen to You" (Van Heusen, Burke) – 4:18
7. "Street" – 3:14
8. "Kitty" – 7:37

== Personnel ==
=== Performers ===
- John Wright – piano
- Eddie "Cat-Eye" Williams – tenor saxophone
- Wendell Marshall – bass
- Roy Brooks – drums

=== Production ===
- Esmond Edwards – supervision
- Rudy Van Gelder – engineer
