= Budd Johnson and the Four Brass Giants =

1960 studio album by Budd Johnson

Studio album by Budd Johnson with Nat Adderley, Harry Edison, Ray Nance & Clark Terry
- Released: 1960
- Recorded: August 22 and September 6, 1960
- Studio: NYC
- Genre: Jazz
- Length: 44:15
- Label: Riverside; RLP 343/RS 9343
- Producer: Cannonball Adderley

Budd Johnson chronology
Blues a la Mode (1958)	Budd Johnson and the Four Brass Giants (1960)	Let's Swing! (1960)

Budd Johnson and the Four Brass Giants is an album by saxophonist Budd Johnson which was recorded in 1960 and released on the Riverside label.

== Reception ==
Professional ratings
Review scores
Source	Rating
AllMusic	4.5/5 stars
The Penguin Guide to Jazz Recordings	3/4 stars

Scott Yanow of AllMusic states, "The great Budd Johnson, who takes tenor solos throughout the date and also contributes a bit of clarinet in addition to providing the arrangements, is matched with four distinctive and very different trumpeters ... the group performs four swing standards and four of Johnson's swinging originals. The colorful brassmen, Budd's versatile solos, and the inventive arrangements make this a particularly memorable set. Highly recommended". In JazzTimes, Duck Baker observed "The soloing is inspired, the program is well chosen and Johnson’s arrangements are great. This is modern-mainstream jazz at its best".

== Track listing ==
All compositions by Budd Johnson except where noted.

1. "All My Love" (Harry Akst, Saul Chaplin, Al Jolson) – 4:05
2. "Blue Lou" (Edgar Sampson, Irving Mills) – 5:11
3. "Driftwood" – 8:08
4. "Trinity River Bottom" – 4:22
5. "Blues for Lester" – 6:56
6. "The Message" – 6:41
7. "Don't Blame Me" (Jimmy McHugh, Dorothy Fields) – 4:16
8. "I'll Get By" (Fred E. Ahlert, Roy Turk) – 4:33
- Recorded in New York City on August 22, 1960 (tracks 1, 2, 7 & 8) and September 6, 1960 (tracks 3–6)

== Personnel ==
- Budd Johnson – tenor saxophone, arranger
- Nat Adderley – cornet
- Harry Edison – trumpet
- Ray Nance – trumpet, violin
- Clark Terry – flugelhorn, trumpet
- Tommy Flanagan (tracks 1, 2, 7 & 8), Jimmy Jones (tracks 3–6) piano
- Joe Benjamin – bass
- Herbie Lovelle – drums
