= Swing Time! =

Studio album by Claude Hopkins with Budd Johnson and Vic Dickenson
- Released: 1963
- Recorded: May 22, 1963
- Studio: Van Gelder Studio, Englewood Cliffs, NJ
- Genre: Jazz
- Length: 38:14
- Label: Swingville; SVLP 2041
- Producer: Don Schlitten

Claude Hopkins chronology
Let's Jam (1961)	Swing Time! (1963)	The Jazz Giants (1968)

Swing Time! is an album by pianist Claude Hopkins with saxophonist Budd Johnson and trombonist Vic Dickenson recorded in 1963 and originally released by the Swingville label.

== Reception ==
Professional ratings
Review scores
Source	Rating
AllMusic	4/5 stars

AllMusic awarded the album 4 stars and the review by Scott Yanow stated "The most surprising aspect to these combo dates is that Hopkins hardly strides at all and comes across as a Teddy Wilson-inspired swing pianist. Much of the time he is in the background, with the success of the sessions really due to the fine playing of the horns. Trombonist Vic Dickenson and tenor saxophonist Budd Johnson play at the high level one would expect".

== Track listing ==
1. "I Cried for You" (Gus Arnheim, Arthur Freed, Abe Lyman) – 5:42
2. "Somebody Loves Me" (George Gershwin, Buddy DeSylva, Ballard MacDonald) – 6:14
3. "Stormy Weather" (Harold Arlen, Ted Koehler) – 6:16
4. "Love Me or Leave Me" (Walter Donaldson, Gus Kahn) – 4:45
5. "Mitzi" (Claude Hopkins) – 5:02
6. "Crying My Heart Out for You" (Hopkins, J. C. Johnson) – 4:25
7. "On the Sunny Side of the Street" (Jimmy McHugh, Dorothy Fields) – 5:50

== Personnel ==
- Claude Hopkins – piano
- Budd Johnson – tenor saxophone
- Vic Dickenson – trombone
- Robert "Bobby" Johnson – trumpet
- Wendell Marshall – bass
- Ferdinand Everett – drums
