= The Last Amen =

Studio album by John Wright
- Released: 1965
- Recorded: December 19, 1961
- Studio: Van Gelder Studio, Englewood Cliffs, New Jersey
- Genre: Jazz
- Label: New Jazz; NJ 8322
- Producer: Esmond Edwards

John Wright chronology
Mr. Soul (1962)	The Last Amen (1965)	Wright Changes & Choices (1994)

The Last Amen is an album by jazz pianist John Wright which was recorded in late 1961 but not released on the New Jazz label until 1965.

== Track listing ==
All compositions by John Wright, except where indicated.

1. "Les I Can't" – 3:39
2. "Be My Love" (Nicholas Brodszky, Sammy Cahn) – 5:57
3. "The Last Amen" – 2:50
4. "Stella by Starlight" (Victor Young, Ned Washington) – 4:24
5. "But Beautiful" (Jimmy Van Heusen, Johnny Burke) – 5:28
6. "'Deed I Do" (Fred Rose, Walter Hirsch) – 4:07
7. "Sheba" – 8:28
8. "More Than You Know" (Vincent Youmans, Edward Eliscu, Billy Rose) – 4:16

== Personnel ==
=== Performers ===
- John Wright - piano
- Gene Taylor - bass
- Walter McCants - drums

=== Production ===
- Esmond Edwards – supervision
- Rudy Van Gelder – engineer
