= Vic Dickenson =

American jazz musician (1906–1984)

- Born: Victor Dickenson; August 6, 1906; Xenia, Ohio, U.S.
- Died: November 16, 1984 (aged 78) New York City
- Genre: Jazz
- Occupation: Musician
- Instrument: Trombone
- Years active: 1920s–1980s
- Formerly of: Count Basie, Sidney Bechet, Earl Hines

Victor Dickenson (August 6, 1906 – November 16, 1984) was an American jazz trombonist. His career began in the 1920s and continued through musical partnerships with Count Basie (1940–41), Sidney Bechet (1941), and Earl Hines.

== Life and career ==
Born in Xenia, Ohio, in 1906, Dickenson wanted to be a plasterer like his father, but he abandoned the idea after injuring himself by falling off a ladder. He studied organ from 1922, then changed to performing trombone with local bands. He made his recording debut in December 1930 as a vocalist with Luis Russell's band. He joined Blanche Calloway's orchestra in the early 1930s. He led his own groups both on the east and west coast between 1947 and the mid-1950s.

From then he was a session man. He appeared on the television program The Sound of Jazz in 1957 with Count Basie, Coleman Hawkins, Roy Eldridge, Gerry Mulligan, and Billie Holiday. He also recorded as a sideman with Jimmy Rushing (on Vanguard Records), Coleman Hawkins (Capitol and Prestige Records), Pee Wee Russell (Black Lion), Benny Carter (Bluebird and Black & Blue), Lester Young (Aladdin and Norgran), Count Basie (Columbia and Pablo). In 1953, he recorded The Vic Dickenson Showcase for Vanguard with Ed Hall on clarinet and Ruby Braff on trumpet. In 1958, Sydney Bechet made him come to France and play record at Brussel exposal.

Dickenson was a member of "The World's Greatest Jazz Band", the house band at The Roosevelt Grill in New York City. He also performed at the same venue in a smaller group that featured him alongside trumpeter Bobby Hackett.

Dickenson is in Art Kane's photograph, A Great Day in Harlem, which includes fellow trombonist Miff Mole.

Dickenson died in New York City in 1984 at the age of 78 as a result of cancer.

== Discography ==
=== As leader/co-leader ===
- Vic Dickenson Showcase, Vol. 1 (Vanguard, 1953)
- Vic Dickenson Showcase, Vol. 2 (Vanguard, 1954)
- Vic Dickenson Septet, Vol. 1 (Vanguard, 1954)
- Vic Dickenson Septet, Vol. 2 (Vanguard, 1954)
- Vic Dickenson Septet, Vol. 3 (Vanguard, 1954)
- Vic Dickenson Septet, Vol. 4 (Vanguard, 1954)
- Vic's Boston Story (Storyville, 1957)
- Mainstream (Atlantic, 1958)
- Newport Jazz Festival All Stars (Atlantic, 1959 [1960]) with Buck Clayton, George Wein, Pee Wee Russell, Bud Freeman, Champ Jones and Jake Hanna
- In Holland (Riff, 1974)
- French Festival (Nice, France 1974) (Classic Jazz Music, 1974)
- Gentleman of the Trombone (Storyville, 1975)
- Vic Dickenson Quintet (SLP, 1976)
- Plays Bessie Smith: Trombone Cholly (Gazell, 1976)
- Roy Eldridge & Vic Dickenson With Eddie Locke & His Friends (Storyville, 1978)
- New York Axis: Phil Wilson & Vic Dickenson (Famous Door, 1980)
- Just Friends (Sackville, 1985)
- Live at Music Room (Valley Vue, 1996)
- Backstage with Bobby Hackett: Milwaukee 1951 (Jasmine, 2000)
- Swing That Music (Black & Blue, 2002)

=== As sideman ===
With Buster Bailey

- All About Memphis (Felsted, 1958)

With Coleman Hawkins

- Coleman Hawkins All Stars (Swingville, 1960) with Joe Thomas

With Johnny Hodges

- Blues-a-Plenty (Verve, 1958)

With Claude Hopkins

- Swing Time! (Swingville, 1963) with Budd Johnson

With Langston Hughes

- Weary Blues (MGM, 1959)

With Budd Johnson

- Blues a la Mode (Felsted, 1958)

With Jo Jones

- The Main Man (Pablo, 1977)

With Al Sears

- Things Ain't What They Used to Be (Swingville, 1961) as part of the Prestige Swing Festival

With Dicky Wells

- Bones for the King (Felsted, 1958)
- Trombone Four-in-Hand (Felsted, 1959)

With Joe Williams

- A Night at Count Basie's (Vanguard, 1956)

With Lester Young

- The Jazz Giants '56 (Verve, 1956)
