= At Ease with Coleman Hawkins =

Studio album by Coleman Hawkins
- Released: 1960
- Recorded: January 29, 1960
- Studios: Van Gelder, Englewood Cliffs, New Jersey
- Genre: Jazz
- Length: 41:34
- Labels: Moodsville; MV 7
- Producer: Esmond Edwards

Coleman Hawkins chronology
Coleman Hawkins All Stars (1960)	At Ease with Coleman Hawkins (1960)	Coleman Hawkins and His Orchestra (1960)

At Ease with Coleman Hawkins (also referred to as Moodsville 7) is an album by saxophonist Coleman Hawkins which was recorded in 1960 and released on the Moodsville label.

== Reception ==
Professional ratings
Review scores
Source	Rating
AllMusic	2/5 stars
The Penguin Guide to Jazz Recordings	3.5/4 stars
DownBeat	3.5/5 stars

Scott Yanow of AllMusic states, "this CD is more successful as pleasant background music than as creative jazz".

In his review for Downbeat, DeMicheal describes most of the music on this album as “background music that can be listened to for musical value or be semi-ignored.” However, DeMicheal praises Hawkins’s work on the last three tracks, where “things perk up considerably.” On Trouble, writes DeMicheal, “Hawk throws off his cloak of moody functionalism and begins to explore. He continues his explorations through Butterfly and plays an excellent solo on I’ll Get By.” According to DeMicheal, “If all the tracks had been of the caliber of the last three, this would have been a higher-rated album.”

== Track listing ==
1. "For You, for Me, for Evermore" (George Gershwin, Ira Gershwin) – 6:07
2. "While We're Young" (William Engvick, Morty Palitz, Alec Wilder) – 3:33
3. "Then I'll Be Tired of You" (Yip Harburg, Arthur Schwartz) – 5:08
4. "Mighty Like a Rose" (Ethelbert Nevin, Frank Lebby Stanton) – 4:00
5. "At Dawning" (Charles Wakefield Cadman) – 4:39
6. "Trouble Is a Man" (Alec Wilder) – 5:25
7. "Poor Butterfly" (John Golden, Raymond Hubbell) – 6:06
8. "I'll Get By (As Long as I Have You)" (Fred E. Ahlert, Roy Turk) – 6:36

== Personnel ==
- Coleman Hawkins – tenor saxophone
- Tommy Flanagan – piano
- Wendell Marshall – bass
- Osie Johnson – drums
