= Nathaniel Cleophas Davis =

Nathaniel Cleophas "N.C." Davis (1888-1972) was an African American musician, composer, educator, bandleader, and owner/publisher of N.C. Davis Music Company of Nashville, Tennessee.

== Early life ==
Born in Tennessee on August 14, 1888, Nathaniel Davis was living and working as a trombonist in Nashville by 1908. With his brothers Otis B. Davis and Clarence M. Davis, he started N. C. Davis Music Publishing at 510 1/2 Cedar Street, Nashville. He taught music for a time at Fisk University and the Tennessee School for the Blind, and founded his own music teaching business about 1913, referred to a different times as the Traveling Conservatory of Music and the Davis Band and Orchestra School. Among his pupils at Fisk University was trumpeter Adolphus Anthony "Doc" Cheatham. When Davis registered for the draft shortly after the United States entered World War I, he described himself as self-employed and a "band organizer and school teacher." From March 29, 1918 to March 7, 1919, Davis served with the U.S. Army's 368th Regiment (92nd Infantry Division) as a musician. The Regiment, whose enlisted men and junior officers were African Americans but its senior officers all white, was stationed in France and it was disbanded upon its return to New York City in March, 1919.

== Compositions ==
Among Davis' compositions are five works for band in ragtime style that feature trombone glissandos, known at the time as "smears" or "jazzes." These include:

- Oh, Slip It Man (published by N. C. Davis Music, 1916)
- Mr. Trombonology (published by N. C. Davis Music, 1917)
- Miss Trombonism (published by C. G. Conn, 1918)
- Master Trombone (published by Carl Fischer, 1919)
- Trombone Francais, a tribute to his wartime service in France (published by Carl Fischer, 1921).

A 1920 trade ad lists three songs published by his firm: "Somebody's Got My Man" (lyric by Miss L. P. Stratton), "I Know Now Who's Got My Man," (lyric by Miss R. E. Davis), and "The Man You've Got Is The Man You Stole From Me" (lyric by O. B. Davis—likely his brother).

Among his other compositions are a ragtime song, Early Mornin' Blues: in her new paraphernalia (words by Otis B. Davis, published by N. C. Davis Music, 1923), the 1926 song "Ah, Keep the Pearl," and Our Lady of Liberty (words by Bernice Stokes, published by W. E. Goldsberry & Co., 1949).

== Other Ventures ==
Nathaniel Davis played in and conducted many bands including his own N. C. Davis Band, P. G. Lowery's Band (which was the first band made exclusively of African Americans to play at sideshows for the Ringling Brothers & Barnum and Bailey Circus, and in which Davis' Mr. Trombonology was often a featured composition), the Lebanon Band, Nashville's Ladies Military Band, and the Gantry Brothers Circus Band. Later in his life, Davis was involved with a number of African-American organizations. He was elected a member of the executive committee of the Colored American Legion, and served for a time as secretary of the Tennessee Colored State Fair Association.

== Personal life ==
Davis married Edith Rose Bonner in Nashville on December 6, 1926. Together they had one son Warren George Davis. Davis has several living grandchildren, great grandchildren and great-great grandchildren. He died in Atlanta, Georgia on December 19, 1972 and is buried in the city's South View Cemetery.
