= Let's Swing! =

Studio album by The Budd Johnson Quintet
- Released: 1961
- Recorded: December 2, 1960
- Studio: Van Gelder Studio, Englewood Cliffs, NJ
- Genre: Jazz
- Length: 42:24
- Label: Swingville; SVLP 2015
- Producer: Esmond Edwards

Budd Johnson chronology
Budd Johnson and the Four Brass Giants (1960)	Let's Swing! (1961)	French Cookin' (1963)

Let's Swing! is an album by saxophonist Budd Johnson which was recorded in 1960 and released on the Swingville label.

== Reception ==
Professional ratings
Review scores
Source	Rating
AllMusic	5/5 stars
DownBeat	3.5/5 stars
The Penguin Guide to Jazz Recordings	3.5/4 stars

The contemporaneous DownBeat reviewer praised the playing of both Johnsons, but commented that there was little of interest in the musical arrangements used. Scott Yanow of AllMusic states, "One of tenor saxophonist Budd Johnson's best showcases, Let's Swing! finds him featured in a quintet ... Throughout, Johnson sounds both modern, as if he had come of age as one of the "cool school," and timeless, since he was a major player by the mid-'30s. A fine set".

== Track listing ==
All compositions by Budd Johnson except where noted.

1. "Serenade in Blue" (Harry Warren, Mack Gordon) – 3:39
2. "I Only Have Eyes for You" (Warren, Al Dubin) – 4:30
3. "Downtown Manhattan" – 7:50
4. "Someone to Watch over Me" (George Gershwin, Ira Gershwin) – 4:47
5. "Falling in Love with Love" (Richard Rodgers, Lorenz Hart) – 5:44
6. "Blues by Budd" – 10:01
7. "Uptown Manhattan" – 6:18

== Personnel ==
- Budd Johnson – tenor saxophone
- Keg Johnson – trombone
- Tommy Flanagan – piano
- George Duvivier – bass
- Charlie Persip – drums
