= Blues a la Mode =

Studio album by Budd Johnson
- Released: 1958
- Recorded: February 11 and 14, 1958
- Studio: NYC
- Genre: Jazz
- Labels: Felsted; FAJ.7007
- Producer: Stanley Dance

Budd Johnson chronology
Blues a la Mode (1958)	Budd Johnson and the Four Brass Giants (1960)

Blues a la Mode is an album by saxophonist Budd Johnson which was recorded in 1958 and released on the Felsted label.

== Reception ==
Professional ratings
Review scores
Source	Rating
AllMusic	4/5 stars

Scott Yanow of AllMusic states, "The leader contributed all six numbers and stars in prime form throughout; Shavers and Bryant also fare quite well".

== Track listing ==
All compositions by Budd Johnson except where noted.

1. "Foggy Nights" – 5:37
2. "Leave Room in Your Heart for Me" (Budd Johnson, John Dobson) – 7:16
3. "Destination Blues" – 5:19
4. "A la Mode" – 7:31
5. "Used Blues" – 7:05
6. "Blues by Five" – 6:06

== Personnel ==
- Budd Johnson – tenor saxophone
- Charlie Shavers – trumpet
- Vic Dickenson – trombone (tracks 1, 3 & 5)
- Al Sears – baritone saxophone (tracks 1, 3 & 5)
- Bert Keyes – piano, organ (tracks 1, 3, 5)
- Ray Bryant – piano (tracks 2, 4, 6)
- Joe Benjamin – bass
- Jo Jones – drums
