= Mr. Soul (John Wright album) =

Studio album by John Wright
- Released: 1962
- Recorded: April 10, 1962
- Studio: Van Gelder Studio, Englewood Cliffs, New Jersey
- Genre: Jazz
- Length: 35:01
- Label: Prestige; PRLP 7233
- Producer: Esmond Edwards

John Wright chronology
Makin' Out (1962)	Mr. Soul (1962)	The Last Amen (1965)

Mr. Soul is an album by jazz pianist John Wright which was recorded in 1962 and released on the Prestige label.

Professional ratings
Review scores
Source	Rating
AllMusic	3/5 stars
The Penguin Guide to Jazz Recordings	3/4 stars

== Track listing ==
All compositions by John Wright, except where indicated.

1. "Our Waltz" (David Rose, Nat Burton) – 5:21
2. "Blue Prelude" (Gordon Jenkins, Joe Bishop) – 3:25
3. "What's New?" (Bob Haggart, Johnny Burke) – 5:29
4. "Everything's Gonna Work Out Fine" – 3:24
5. "Mr. Soul" (Esmond Edwards) – 5:32
6. "Shake" – 2:31
7. "Strut" – 5:16
8. "Now Hang in There" – 4:03

== Personnel ==
=== Performers ===
- John Wright - piano
- Wendell Marshall - bass
- Walter Perkins - drums

=== Production ===
- Esmond Edwards – supervision
- Rudy Van Gelder – engineer
