= Swing's the Thing (Al Sears album) =

Studio album by Al Sears
- Released: 1961
- Recorded: November 29, 1960
- Studio: Van Gelder Studio, Englewood Cliffs, NJ
- Genre: Jazz
- Length: 37:06
- Label: Swingville; SVLP 2018
- Producer: Esmond Edwards

Al Sears chronology
Rockin' in Rhythm (1960)	Swing's the Thing (1961)	Things Ain't What They Used to Be (1961)

Swing's the Thing is an album by saxophonist Al Sears, recorded in 1960 and released on the Swingville label.

== Reception ==
Professional ratings
Review scores
Source	Rating
AllMusic	4.5/5 stars
The Encyclopedia of Popular Music	3/5 stars

Scott Yanow of AllMusic wrote: "A fine swing-based tenor who could stomp and honk with the best of them (although he rarely screamed), Sears had relatively few opportunities to record as a leader ... Sears sticks to basic originals, blues, and standards, and is in top form on these swinging and generally accessible performances."

== Track listing ==
All compositions by Al Sears, except where indicated.

1. "Moving Out" (Walter Bishop) – 4:29
2. "Record Hop" – 4:32
3. "Take off Road" – 3:41
4. "Already Alright" – 5:08
5. "In a Mellow Tone" (Duke Ellington, Milt Gabler) – 5:30
6. "Out of Nowhere" (Johnny Green, Edward Heyman) – 3:04
7. "Ain't No Use" (Don Abney) – 6:36
8. "The Thrill Is Gone" (Ray Henderson, Lew Brown) – 4:02

== Personnel ==
- Al Sears – tenor saxophone
- Wally Richardson – guitar
- Don Abney – piano
- Wendell Marshall – bass
- Joe Marshall – drums
