= French Cookin' (Budd Johnson album) =

Studio album by Budd Johnson
- Released: 1963
- Recorded: January 30, 1963
- Studio: Van Gelder Studio, Englewood Cliffs, NJ
- Genre: Jazz
- Length: 42:32
- Label: Argo; LP/LPS-721
- Producer: Esmond Edwards

Budd Johnson chronology
Let's Swing! (1960)	French Cookin' (1963)	Ya! Ya! (1964)

French Cookin' is an album by saxophonist Budd Johnson which was recorded in 1963 and released on the Argo label.

Professional ratings
Review scores
Source	Rating
AllMusic	3/5 stars

== Track listing ==
1. "La Petite Valse" (Duke Ellington, Phyllis Claire, Joe Heyne) – 3:06
2. "Le Grisbi" (Jean Wiener, Marc Lanjean, Norman Gimbel) – 5:44
3. "I Can Live with the Blues" (Budd Johnson) – 4:33
4. "Darling, Je Vous Aime Beaucoup" (Anna Sosenko) – 4:38
5. "Under Paris Skies" (Jean Dréjac, Kim Gannon, Hubert Giraud) – 4:25
6. "Hugues Blues" (Johnson) – 3:50
7. "Je Vous Aime" (Sam Coslow) – 5:00
8. "Je T' Aime" (Harry Archer) – 4:20

== Personnel ==
- Budd Johnson – tenor saxophone
- Hank Jones – piano
- Kenny Burrell, Everett Barksdale – guitar
- Milt Hinton – bass
- Willie Rodriguez – latin percussion
- Osie Johnson – drums
- Joseph Venuto – marimba, vibraphone
