= Al Sears =

American jazz tenor saxophonist and bandleader (1910–1990)

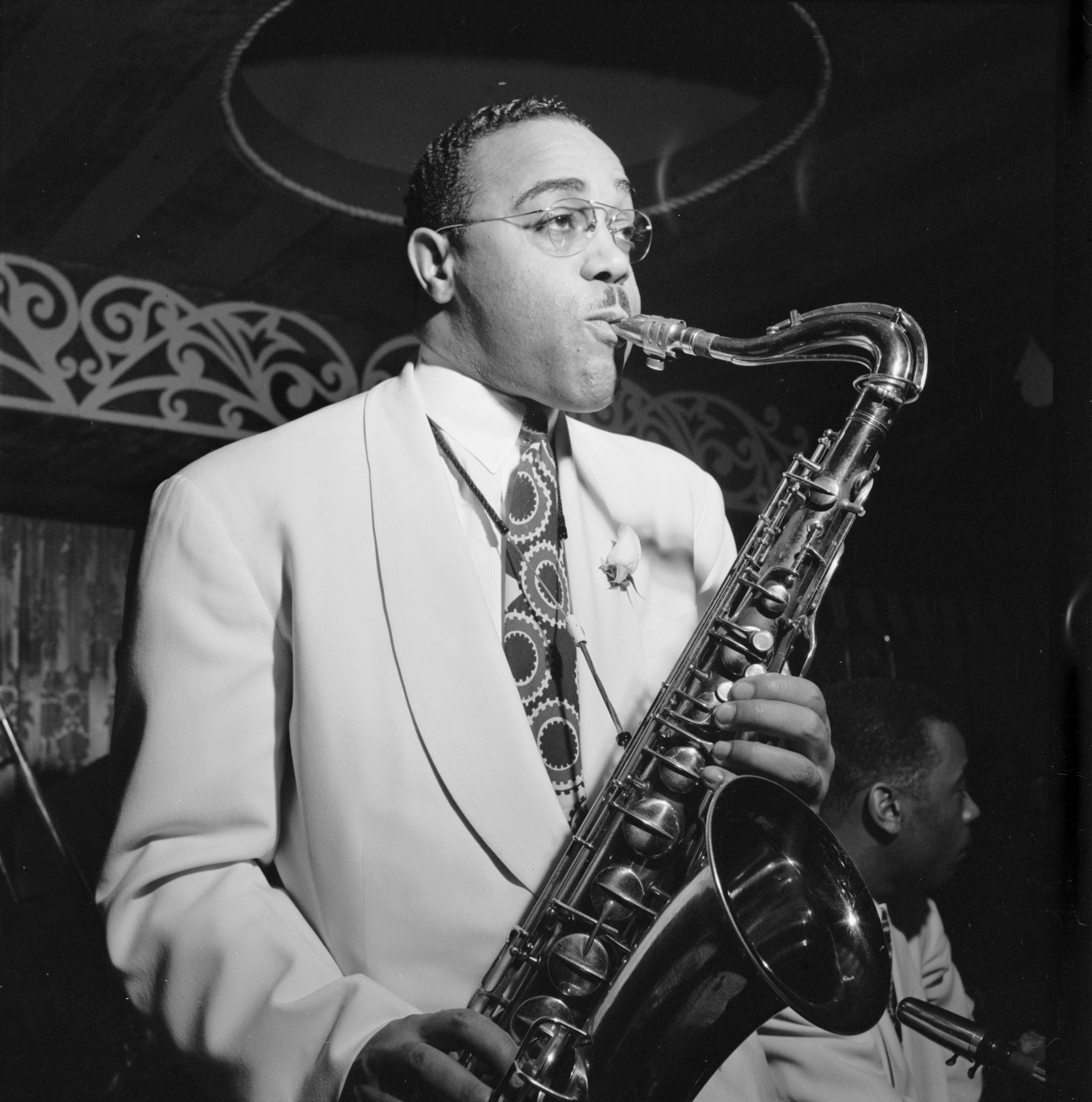
- Sears at the Aquarium jazz club, 1946; by William P. Gottlieb

Background information
- Also known as: "Big Al Sears"
- Born: Albert Omega Sears; February 21, 1910; Macomb, Illinois, U.S.
- Died: March 23, 1990 (aged 80) St. Albans, Queens, New York City, U.S.
- Genres: Jazz; R&B
- Occupations: Musician; bandleader
- Instrument: Tenor saxophone
- Years active: 1920s–1960s
- Labels: Audio Lab; Prestige; Swingville; Arock; Serock; Gator
- Formerly of: Chick Webb; Andy Kirk; Lionel Hampton; Duke Ellington; Johnny Hodges; Alan Freed

Albert Omega Sears (February 21, 1910 – March 23, 1990) was an American jazz tenor saxophonist and bandleader, sometimes credited as Big Al Sears.

Sears was born in Macomb, Illinois. His first major gig came in 1928 when he replaced Johnny Hodges in Chick Webb's ensemble. Following this, he played with Elmer Snowden (1931–32), then led his own groups between 1933 and 1941. In the early 1940s, he was with Andy Kirk (1941–42) and Lionel Hampton (1943–44) before he became a member of Duke Ellington's Orchestra in 1944, replacing Ben Webster. He remained with Ellington until 1949, when first Jimmy Forrest and then Paul Gonsalves took over his chair. He played with Johnny Hodges in 1951–52 and recorded the tune "Castle Rock" with him; the tune became a hit but was released under Hodges's name.

Sears was in Alan Freed's band when Freed did live shows, being introduced as "Big Al Sears". He played as a studio musician on R&B albums in the 1950s and recorded two albums for Swingville in 1960. He also owned several record labels, including Arock, Serock, and Gator.

He died in St. Albans, Queens, at the age of 80, in 1990.

== Discography ==
=== As leader ===
- Grade "A" Dance Music with a Swing Beat (Audio Lab, 1960)
- Swing's the Thing (Prestige, 1960)
- Rockin' in Rhythm (Prestige, 1960) – with Taft Jordan and Hilton Jefferson as the "Swingville All-Stars"
- Things Ain't What They Used to Be (Swingville, 1961)

=== As sideman ===
- Mildred Anderson, No More in Life (Prestige, 1961)
- Aretha Franklin, Aretha (Columbia, 1961)
- Al Hibbler, After the Lights Go Down Low (Atlantic, 1957)
- Johnny Hodges, Castle Rock (Norgran, 1955)
- Johnny Hodges, In a Tender Mood (Norgan, 1955)
- Budd Johnson, Blues a la Mode (Felsted, 1958)
- Jimmy Witherspoon, Goin' to Kansas City Blues (RCA Victor, 1958)
