= The Bud Freeman All-Stars featuring Shorty Baker =

Studio album by Bud Freeman All-Stars featuring Shorty Baker
- Released: 1960
- Recorded: May 4, 1960
- Studio: Van Gelder Studio, Englewood Cliffs, NJ
- Genre: Jazz
- Length: 38:57
- Label: Swingville; SVLP 2012
- Producer: Esmond Edwards

Bud Freeman chronology
Bud Freeman & His Summa Cum Laude Trio (1958)	The Bud Freeman All-Stars featuring Shorty Baker (1960)	Midnight Session (1960)

The Bud Freeman All-Stars featuring Shorty Baker is an album by saxophonist Bud Freeman with trumpeter Shorty Baker recorded in 1960 and originally released on the Swingville label.

== Reception ==
Professional ratings
Review scores
Source	Rating
AllMusic	4/5 stars

AllMusic reviewer Scott Yanow stated: "Tenor-sax great Bud Freeman, who is often associated with the Eddie Condon school of Nicksieland, is heard heading an excellent swing quintet for this 1960 studio session. Trumpeter Harold "Shorty" Baker (best known for his periods with Duke Ellington) made too few small-group recordings throughout his life so this is one of his best ... the group plays superior standards and a couple of originals on this fine swing date".

== Track listing ==
1. "I Let a Song Go Out of My Heart" (Duke Ellington, Irving Mills, Henry Nemo, John Redmond) – 5:18
2. "S'posin'" (Paul Denniker, Andy Razaf) – 5:41
3. "March On, March On" (Esmond Edwards)– 4:49
4. "Shorty's Blues" (Bud Freeman, Claude Hopkins, Shorty Baker) – 4:45
5. "Love Me or Leave Me" (Walter Donaldson, Gus Kahn) – 5:18
6. "Something to Remember You By" (Arthur Schwartz, Howard Dietz) – 4:41
7. "Hector's Dance" (Freeman, Hopkins, Baker) – 3:26
8. "But Not For Me" (George Gershwin, Ira Gershwin) – 4:26

== Personnel ==
- Bud Freeman – tenor saxophone
- Shorty Baker – trumpet
- Claude Hopkins – piano
- George Duvivier – bass
- J. C. Heard – drums
