= Andrew Kirk =

Andrew Kirk may refer to:

- Andrew Jackson Kirk (1866–1933), U.S. Representative from Kentucky
- Andrew Kirk (rugby league) (born 1982), English professional rugby league footballer
- Andy Kirk (musician) (1898–1992), jazz musician
- Andy Kirk (footballer) (born 1979), Northern Irish association football player
- Andy Kirk (soccer) (born 1977), American association football player
- Drew Kirk, fictional character in the Australian soap opera Neighbours
