= Doc Cheatham =

American jazz trumpeter, singer, and bandleader (1905–1997)

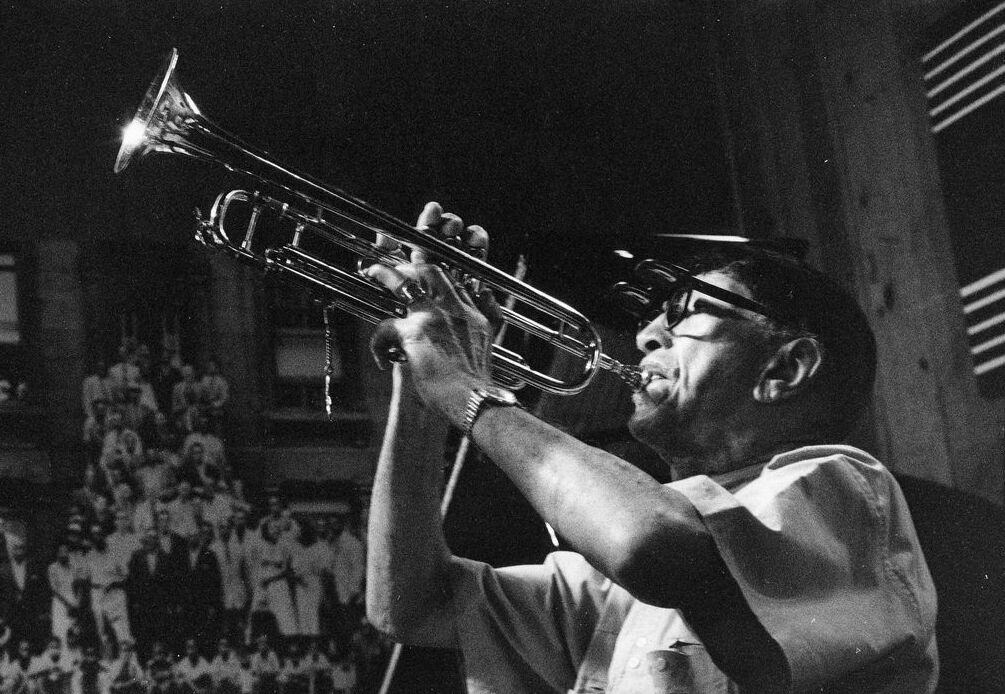
- Photo by Ed Newman

Background information
- Born: Adolphus Anthony Cheatham; June 13, 1905; Nashville, Tennessee, United States
- Died: June 2, 1997 (aged 91) Washington D.C., United States
- Genres: Swing, Dixieland, big band
- Occupation: Bandleader
- Instruments: Trumpet, vocals
- Labels: Sackville, Black & Blue, Jazzology, Metronome, Stash

Adolphus Anthony Cheatham, better known as Doc Cheatham (June 13, 1905 – June 2, 1997), was an American jazz trumpeter, singer, and bandleader. He is also the grandfather of musician Theo Croker.

== Early life ==
Doc Cheatham was born in Nashville, Tennessee, United States, of African, Cherokee and Choctaw heritage. He noted there was no jazz music there in his youth; like many in the United States he was introduced to the style by early recordings and touring groups at the end of the 1910s. Cheatham started playing music when he was 15, first on the cornet and soon after the trumpet, taking trumpet lessons from Fisk University professor N. C. Davis. He also played saxophone and drums. abandoned his family's plans for him to be a pharmacist (although retaining the medically inspired nickname "Doc") to play music, performing in Nashville's African American Vaudeville theater. Cheatham later toured in band accompanying blues singers on the Theater Owners Booking Association circuit. His early jazz influences included Henry Busse and Johnny Dunn, but when he moved to Chicago in 1924, he heard King Oliver. Oliver's playing was a revelation to Cheatham. Cheatham followed him around. Oliver gave young Cheatham a mute, which Cheatham treasured and performed with for the rest of his career. A further revelation came the following year when Louis Armstrong returned to Chicago. Armstrong would be a lifelong influence on Cheatham, describing him as "an ordinary-extraordinary man."

== Working with the name bands ==
Cheatham played in Albert Wynn's band (and occasionally substituted for Armstrong at the Vendome Theater), and recorded on sax with Ma Rainey before moving to Philadelphia in 1927, where he worked with the bands of Bobby Lee and Wilbur de Paris, before moving to New York City the following year. After a short stint with Chick Webb, he left to tour Europe with Sam Wooding's band.

Cheatham returned to the United States in 1930, and played with Marion Handy and McKinney's Cotton Pickers, before landing a job with Cab Calloway. Cheatham was Calloway's lead trumpeter from 1932 through 1939. According to a personal discussion with Doc Cheatham, he studied with Max Schlossberg for six months in 1931. "I approached the topic, at Sweet Basil's, because his tone was like Schlossberg's; I had heard Schlossberg, my grand uncle, play once, at home, in 1936." [Norman M. Canter, M.D.]

He performed with Benny Carter, Teddy Wilson, Fletcher Henderson, and Claude Hopkins in the 1940s; after World War II he started working regularly with Latin bands in New York City, including the bands of Perez Prado, Marcelino Guerra, Ricardo Ray (on whose catchy, hook-laden album Jala, Jala Boogaloo, Volume II, he played exquisitely (but uncredited), particularly on the track "Mr. Trumpet Man"), Machito, and others. The first time Cheatham joined Machito's band, he was fired because he could not cope with clave rhythm. Cheatham eventually got the hang of it though. In addition to continuing Latin gigs, he played again with Wilbur de Paris and Sammy Price. He led his own band on Broadway for five years, starting in 1960, after which he toured with Benny Goodman.

In 1959, the U.S. State Department funded a trip for bandleader Herbie Mann to visit Africa, after they heard his version of "African Suite". The grueling 14-week tour took place between December 31, 1959, to April 5, 1960. Band personnel included Herbie Mann, bandleader, flute and sax; Johnny Rae, vibist and arranger; Don Payne, bass; Doc Cheatham, trumpet; Jimmy Knepper, trombone; Patato Valdés congas; and Jose Mangual, bongos. Destinations listed on the official itinerary included Sierra Leone, Liberia, Nigeria, Mozambique, Rhodesia, Tanganyika, Kenya, Ethiopia, Sudan, Morocco, Tunisia.

== Later work ==
In the 1970s, Cheatham made a vigorous self-assessment to improve his playing, including taping himself and critically listening to the recordings, then endeavoring to eliminate all clichés from his playing. The discipline paid off, and he received ever-improving critical attention.

His singing career began almost by accident in a Paris recording studio on May 2, 1977. As a level and microphone check at the start of a recording session with Sammy Price's band, Cheatham sang and scatted his way through a couple of choruses of "What Can I Say Dear After I Say I'm Sorry". The miking happened to be good from the start and the tape machine was already rolling, and the track was issued on the LP Doc Cheatham: Good for What Ails You. His singing was well received and Cheatham continued to sing in addition to play music for the rest of his career.

Cheatham toured widely in addition to his regular Sunday gig leading the band at Sweet Basil in Manhattan's Greenwich Village in his final decade. During one of his frequent trips to New Orleans, Louisiana, he met and befriended young trumpet virtuoso Nicholas Payton. In 1996, the two trumpeters and pianist Butch Thompson recorded a CD for Verve Records, Doc Cheatham and Nicholas Payton. The Recording Academy nominated Cheatham for Best Jazz Instrumental Solo and Best Jazz Instrumental Performance, Individual or Group.

In 1998, he posthumously won a Grammy Award for Best Improvised Jazz Solo for "Stardust" on his CD, Doc Cheatham and Nicholas Payton. His wife Amanda and daughter Alicia accepted the Grammy on his behalf.

== Death ==
Doc Cheatham continued playing until two days before his death from a stroke suffered the night of his final performance. At the time of his passing, he was eleven days shy of his 92nd birthday.

== Discography ==
- 1961 Shorty & Doc with Shorty Baker (Swingville)
- 1973 Adolphus Doc Cheatham (Jezebel)
- 1975 Hey Doc! (Black & Blue)
- 1976 Doc and Sammy (Sackville)
- 1977 Good for What Ails Ya (Classic Jazz)
- 1979 Black Beauty (Sackville)
- 1979 John, Doc and Herb (Metronome)
- 1982 I've Got a Crush on You (New York Jazz)
- 1982 It's a Good Life (Parkwood)
- 1982 Too Marvelous for Words (New York Jazz)
- 1983 The Fabulous Doc Cheatham (Parkwood)
- 1985 At the Bern Jazz Festival (Sackville)
- 1985 Highlights in Jazz (Stash)
- 1987 Tribute to Billie Holiday (Kenneth)
- 1988 Dear Doc (Orange Blue)
- 1988 Tribute to Louis Armstrong (Kenneth)
- 1988 Doc Cheatham and Sammy Price in New Orleans with Lars Edegran's Jazz Band (GHB)
- 1992 Eartha Kitt/Doc Cheatham/Bill Coleman with George Duvivier & Co. (DRG)
- 1992 Echoes of New Orleans (Big Easy)
- 1992 You're a Sweetheart (Sackville)
- 1993 Live (Natasha Imports)
- 1993 The Eighty-Seven Years of Doc Cheatham (Columbia)
- 1995 Duets and Solos
- 1995 Swinging Down in New Orleans (Jazzology)
- 1996 Live at Sweet Basil (Jazzology)
- 1997 Doc Cheatham & Nicholas Payton with Nicholas Payton (Verve)
- 1997 Mood Indigo: A Memorial (Viper's Nest)
- 1999 At the Vineyard on a Cold Sunday in January
- 2000 Live at the Windsor Jazz Series 1981 (Jazzology)
- 2003 Meets the Swiss Dixie Stompers Plus Two (Jazzology)
- 2011 From Dixie to Swing (Traditions Alive, 2011)
- 2013 Live in New York 1985 with George Kelly (City Hall/Squatty Roo, 1985, 2013)

With Benny Carter

- Legends (MusicMasters, 1993)

With Dizzy Gillespie

- To Diz with Love (Telarc, 1992)

With Herbie Mann

- Flute, Brass, Vibes and Percussion (Verve, 1959)
- The Common Ground (Atlantic, 1960)
- Our Mann Flute (Atlantic, 1966)

With Jay McShann

- The Big Apple Bash (Atlantic, 1979)

With Sammy Price

- Fire (Black & Blue, 1975)
