= John Wright (pianist) =

American jazz pianist (1934–2017)

- Born: John Albert Wright; September 7, 1934; Louisville, Kentucky, United States
- Died: December 15, 2017 (aged 83) Chicago, Illinois, United States
- Genres: Soul jazz; hard bop; mainstream jazz; jazz blues
- Occupations: Musician, composer
- Instrument: piano
- Label: Prestige

John Albert Wright (September 7, 1934 - December 15, 2017) was an American jazz pianist who was active in Chicago, especially during the 1960s.

== Life and work ==
John Wright was born in Louisville, Kentucky, in 1934. His family moved to Chicago in 1936 where his mother, an evangelistic preacher, founded a church at which he had begun to play piano by the age of seven. He attended Wendell Phillips High School and played organ at the Christian Hope M.B. Baptist Church before enlisting in the military in 1952 where he was stationed in Germany with the 7th Army Special Services and developed his skills in playing jazz.

Upon his return to Chicago in 1955, Wright performed in the local jazz scene in clubs and in 1960 began to record for the Prestige label producing a total of five albums for the label between 1960 and 1962.

Wright continued to perform on the Chicago club scene and worked as a librarian at the Cook County Jail from the mid-1980s until 1999. In 1994, he recorded a final album Wright Changes & Choices.

In 2008, Wright was inducted into the Wendell Phillips High School Hall of Fame, and in 2009 he was awarded the Walter Dyett Lifetime Achievement Award by the Jazz Institute of Chicago. Wright died in late 2017, and tribute concerts were performed in his memory at the 2018 Chicago Jazz Festival and 2018 Hyde Park Jazz Festival.

== Discography ==
=== As leader ===
- South Side Soul (Prestige, 1960)
- Nice 'n' Tasty (Prestige, 1960)
- Makin' Out (Prestige, 1961)
- Mr. Soul (Prestige, 1962)
- The Last Amen (Prestige, 1961 [1965])
- Wright Changes & Choices (Norma, 1994)

=== As sideman ===
With Arbee Stidham

- Tired of Wandering (Prestige, 1961)
