= Lonnie Johnson (musician) =

American blues and jazz musician (1899–1970)

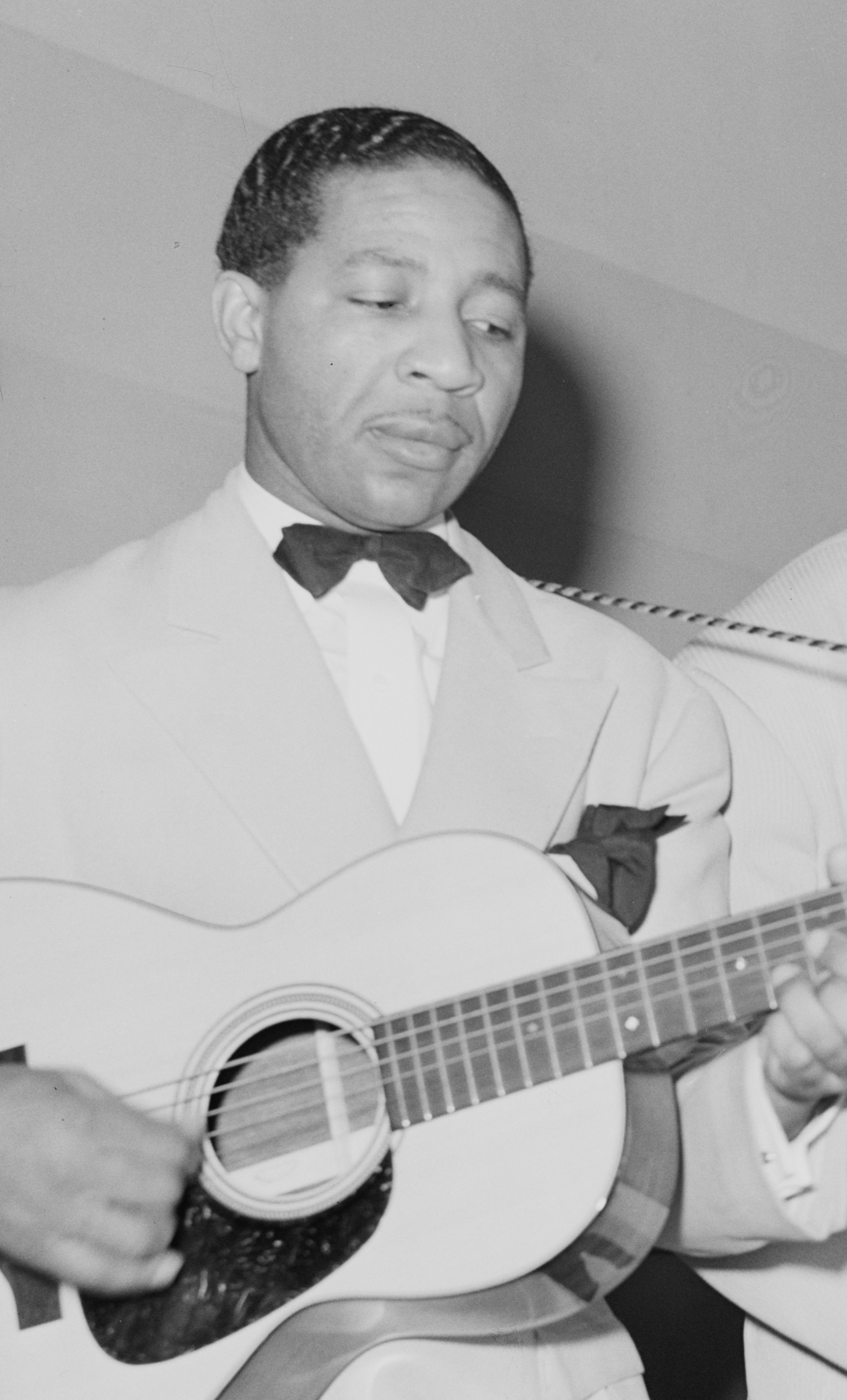
- Johnson in Chicago, 1941

Background information
- Born: Alonzo Johnson; February 8, 1899; New Orleans, Louisiana, U.S.
- Died: June 16, 1970 (aged 71) Toronto, Canada
- Genres: Jazz, blues
- Occupation: Musician
- Instruments: Guitar, violin, vocals
- Labels: Okeh; Bluebird; King; Bluesville

Alonzo "Lonnie" Johnson (February 8, 1899 – June 16, 1970) was an American blues and jazz singer, guitarist, violinist and songwriter. He was a pioneer of jazz guitar and jazz violin and is recognized as the first to play an electrically amplified violin.

== Biography ==
=== Early career ===
Johnson was born in New Orleans, Louisiana and raised in a family of musicians. He studied violin, piano and guitar as a child and learned to play various other instruments, including the mandolin, but he concentrated on the guitar throughout his professional career. "There was music all around us," he recalled, "and in my family you'd better play something, even if you just banged on a tin can."

In 1917, Johnson joined a revue that toured England, returning home in 1919 to find that all of his family, except his brother James, had died in the 1918 influenza epidemic.

He and his brother settled in St. Louis in 1921, where they performed as a duo. Lonnie also worked on riverboats and in the orchestra of Charlie Creath. He was good friends with Fate Marable but never performed with him.

In 1925, Johnson married, and his wife, Mary, soon began a blues career of her own, performing as Mary Johnson and pursuing a recording career from 1929 to 1936. (She is not to be confused with the later soul and gospel singer of the same name.)

As with many other early blues artists, information on Mary Johnson is often contradictory and confusing. Various online sources give her name before marriage as Mary Smith and state that she began performing in her teens. However, the writer James Sallis gave her original name as Mary Williams and stated that her interest in writing and performing blues began when she started helping Lonnie write songs and developed from there. The two never recorded together. They had six children before their divorce in 1932.

=== Success in the 1920s and 1930s ===
In 1925, Johnson entered and won a blues contest at the Booker T. Washington Theatre in St. Louis, the prize being a recording contract with Okeh Records. Between 1925 and 1932 he made about 130 recordings for Okeh, many of which sold well (making him one of the most popular OKeh artists). He was called to New York to record with the leading blues singers of the day, including Victoria Spivey and the country blues singer Alger "Texas" Alexander. He also toured with Bessie Smith, a top attraction of the Theater Owners Booking Association.

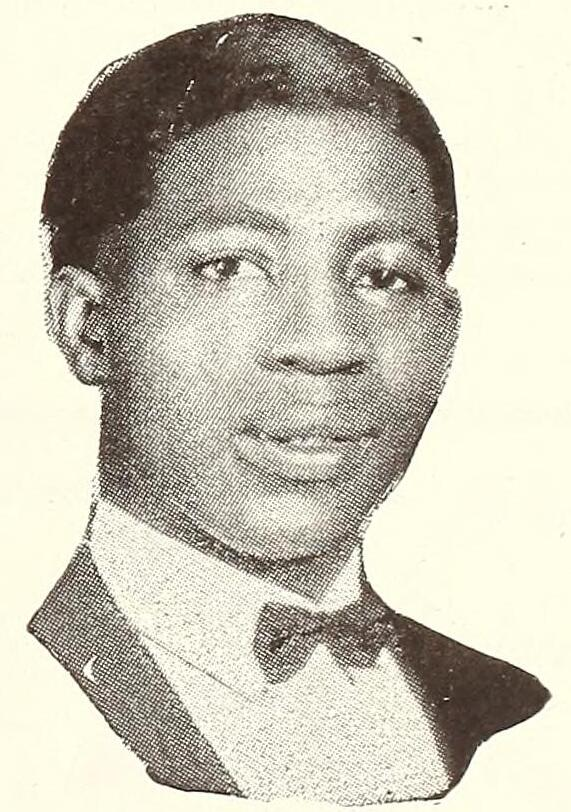
Johnson c. 1926

Okeh used the images of Louis Armstrong and Johnson in ads for the Defender. In December 1927, Johnson recorded in Chicago as a guest artist with Louis Armstrong and His Hot Five, paired with the banjoist Johnny St. Cyr. He played on the sides "I'm Not Rough", "Savoy Blues", and "Hotter Than That". The most famous of the three sides, "Hotter than That," encompassed the New Orleans traditions of polymetric tension, scat, dialogue, collective improvisation, and timbral diversity. In an unusual move, Johnson was invited to sit in with many OKeh jazz groups. In 1928, he recorded "Hot and Bothered", "Move Over", and "The Mooche" with Duke Ellington for Okeh. He also recorded with a group called the Chocolate Dandies (in this case, McKinney's Cotton Pickers). He pioneered the guitar solo on the 1927 track "6/88 Glide", and on many of his early recordings he played 12-string guitar solos in a style that influenced such future jazz guitarists as George Barnes, Charlie Christian and Django Reinhardt giving the instrument new meaning as a jazz voice. He excelled in purely instrumental pieces, some of which he recorded with the white jazz guitarist Eddie Lang. Their guitar duets, recorded for Okeh between 1928 and 1929, are regarded as among the earliest integrated jazz recordings: Lang was billed under the pseudonym "Blind Willie Dunn" on the race-series sides, the songwriting credited to "Johnson–Dunn," and the pair also recorded with King Oliver as the integrated group Blind Willie Dunn and His Gin Bottle Four. Much of Johnson's music featured experimental improvisations that would now be categorized as jazz rather than blues. According to the blues historian Gérard Herzhaft, Johnson was "undeniably the creator of the guitar solo played note by note with a pick, which has become the standard in jazz, blues, country, and rock". Johnson's style reached both the Delta bluesmen and urban players who would adapt and develop his one-string solos into the modern electric blues style. However, the writer Elijah Wald declared that in the 1920s and 1930s Johnson was best known as a sophisticated and urbane singer rather than an instrumentalist: "Of the forty ads for his records that appeared in the Chicago Defender between 1926 and 1931, not one even mentioned that he played guitar."

Johnson's compositions often depicted the social conditions confronting urban African Americans ("Racketeers' Blues", "Hard Times Ain't Gone Nowhere", "Fine Booze and Heavy Dues"). In his lyrics he captured the nuances of male-female love relationships in a way that went beyond Tin Pan Alley sentimentalism. His songs displayed an ability to understand the heartaches of others, which Johnson saw as the essence of his blues.

After touring with Bessie Smith in 1929, Johnson moved to Chicago and recorded for Okeh with the stride pianist James P. Johnson. However, with the temporary demise of the recording industry in the Great Depression, he was compelled to make a living outside music, working at one point in a steel mill in Peoria, Illinois. In 1932 he moved again, to Cleveland, Ohio, where he lived for the rest of the decade. There he performed on radio programs and intermittently played with the band backing the singer Putney Dandridge.

By the late 1930s, he was recording and performing in Chicago for Decca Records, working with Roosevelt Sykes and Blind John Davis, among others. In 1939, during a session for Bluebird Records with the pianist Joshua Altheimer, Johnson used an electric guitar for the first time. He recorded 34 tracks for Bluebird over the next five years, including the hits "He's a Jelly Roll Baker" and "In Love Again".

=== Later career ===
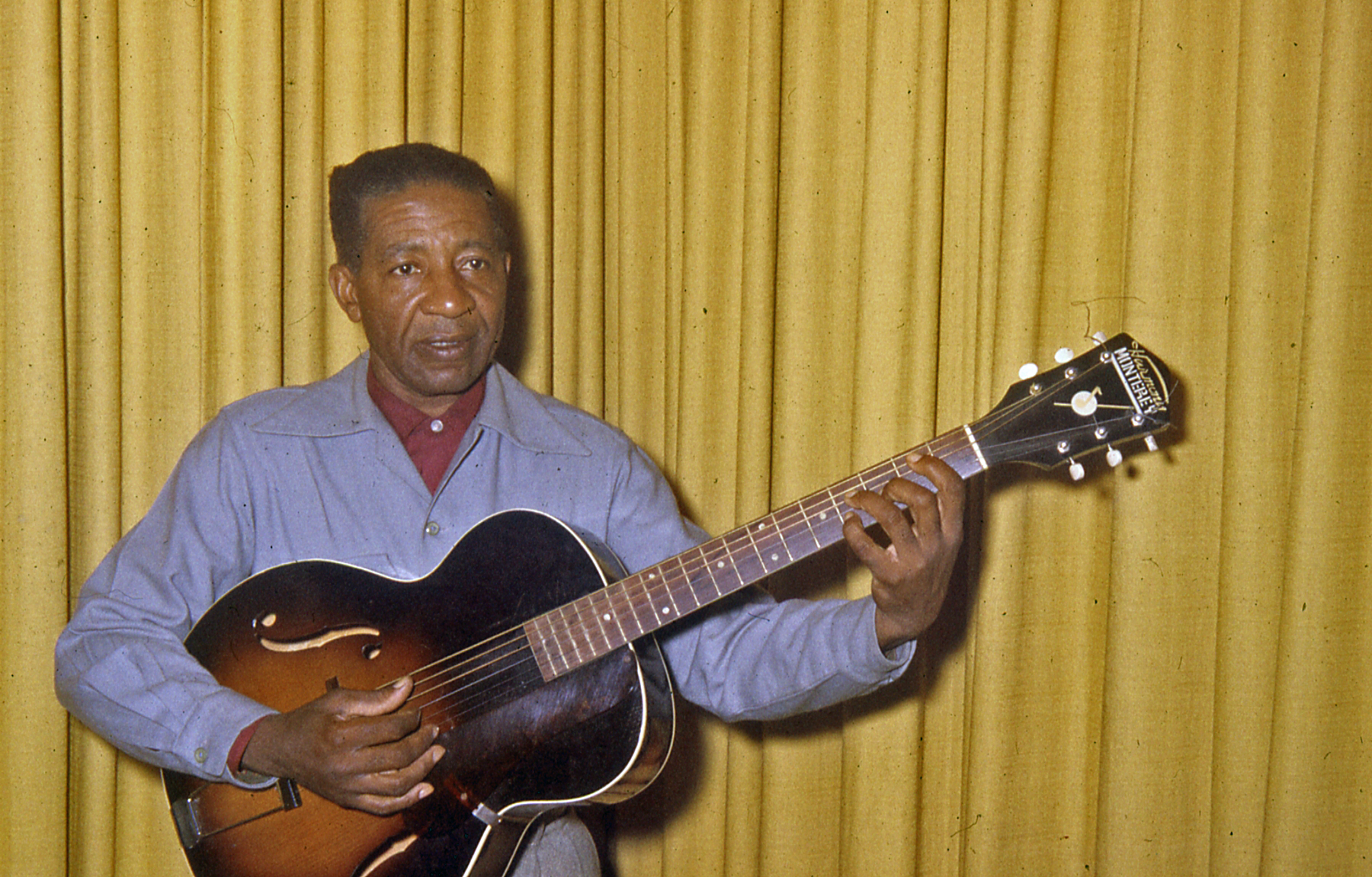
Johnson in 1960

After World War II, Johnson made the transition to rhythm and blues, recording for King in Cincinnati and having a hit in 1948 with "Tomorrow Night" written by Sam Coslow and Will Grosz. The song topped the Billboard Race Records chart for seven weeks and reached number 19 on the pop chart with sales of three million copies. A blues ballad with piano accompaniment and background singers, the song bore little resemblance to much of Johnson's earlier blues and jazz material. The follow-ups "Pleasing You", "So Tired", and "Confused" were also R&B hits.

In 1952 Johnson toured England. Tony Donegan, a British musician who played on the same bill, paid tribute to Johnson by changing his name to Lonnie Donegan. Johnson's performances are thought to have been received poorly by British audiences; this may have been due to organizational problems with the tour.

After returning to the United States, Johnson moved to Philadelphia. He worked in a steel foundry and as a janitor. In 1959 he was working at the Benjamin Franklin Hotel in Philadelphia when WHAT-FM disc jockey Chris Albertson located him and produced Blues by Lonnie Johnson for Bluesville Records. This was followed by other Prestige albums, including one (Blues & Ballads) with Duke Ellington's former boss Elmer Snowden, who had helped Albertson locate Johnson. Snowden had been the original bandleader of the Washingtonians, which Ellington took over after Snowden vacated the position and made into the famous Ellington orchestra. There followed a Chicago engagement for Johnson at the Playboy Club. This succession of events placed him back on the music scene at a fortuitous time: young audiences were embracing folk music, and many veteran performers were stepping out of obscurity. Johnson was reunited with Duke Ellington and appeared as a guest at an all-star folk concert.

In 1961, Johnson was reunited with his Okeh recording partner Victoria Spivey for another Prestige album, Idle Hours, and the two singers performed at Gerdes Folk City. In 1963 he toured Europe as part of the American Folk Blues Festival with Muddy Waters and others, and recorded an album with Otis Spann in Denmark.

In May 1965, he performed at a club in Toronto before an audience of four people. Two weeks later, his shows at a different club attracted a larger audience, and Johnson, encouraged by Toronto's relative racial harmony, decided to move to the city. He opened his club, Home of the Blues, on Toronto's Yorkville Avenue in 1966, but it was a business failure, and Johnson was fired by the man who became owner. Through the rest of the decade, he recorded, played clubs in Canada, and embarked on several regional tours.

In 1993, Smithsonian Folkways released The Complete Folkways Recordings, an anthology of Johnson's music, on Folkways Records. He had been featured on several compilation blues albums from Folkways, beginning in the 1960s, but never released a solo album on the label in his lifetime.

== Injury ==
In March 1969 he was hit by a car while walking on a sidewalk in Toronto. He was seriously injured, suffering a broken hip and kidney injuries. A benefit concert was held on May 4, 1969, with two dozen acts that included Ian and Sylvia Tyson, John Lee Hooker, and Hagood Hardy. He never fully recovered from his injuries and suffered what was described as a stroke. He was able to return to the stage for one performance at Massey Hall on February 23, 1970, walking with the aid of a cane, to sing a couple of songs with Buddy Guy; Johnson received a standing ovation.

== Death ==
Johnson died on June 16, 1970. A funeral was held at Mount Hope Cemetery in Toronto by his friends and fellow musicians, but his family members insisted on transferring the body to Philadelphia where he was buried. He was "virtually broke." The Killer Blues Headstone project, a nonprofit organization that places headstones on unmarked graves of blues musicians, purchased a headstone for Johnson around 2014.

== Influence ==
Johnson's early recordings are the first guitar recordings that display a single-note soloing style with string bending and vibrato. Johnson pioneered this style of guitar playing on records, and his influence is obvious in the playing of Django Reinhardt, T-Bone Walker and virtually all electric blues guitarists. B.B. King wrote in his 1996 autobiography Blues All Around Me that, when he was a young boy, Blind Lemon Jefferson and Lonnie Johnson “hit me the hardest, I believe, because their voices were so distinct, natural, and believable. I heard them talking to me.”

One of Elvis Presley's earliest recordings was a version of Johnson's blues ballad "Tomorrow Night", written by Sam Coslow and Will Grosz. Presley's vocal phrasing mimics Johnson's, and many of Presley's signature vibrato and baritone sounds can be heard in development. "Tomorrow Night" was also recorded by LaVern Baker and (in 1957) by Jerry Lee Lewis.

In the liner notes for the album Biograph, Bob Dylan described his encounters with Johnson in New York City. "I was lucky to meet Lonnie Johnson at the same club I was working and I must say he greatly influenced me. You can hear it in that first record. I mean Corrina, Corrina...that's pretty much Lonnie Johnson. I used to watch him every chance I got and sometimes he'd let me play with him. I think he and Tampa Red and of course Scrapper Blackwell, that's my favorite style of guitar playing." In his autobiography, Chronicles, Vol. 1, Dylan wrote about the performing method he learned from Lonnie Johnson and remarked that Robert Johnson had learned a lot from Lonnie Johnson. Some of Robert Johnson's songs, such as "Malted Milk," are seen as new versions of songs recorded by Lonnie Johnson.

== Discography ==
=== As leader ===
- Lonesome Road (King, 1958)
- Blues by Lonnie Johnson (Prestige Bluesville, 1960)
- Blues & Ballads (Prestige Bluesville, 1960)
- Losing Game (Prestige Bluesville, 1961)
- Another Night to Cry (Prestige Bluesville, 1962)
- Idle Hours (Prestige Bluesville, 1962)
- Swingin' the Blues (Xtra, 1966)
- Eddie Lang & Lonnie Johnson Vol. 1 (Swaggie, 1967)
- Eddie Lang & Lonnie Johnson Vol. 2 (Swaggie, 1970)
- Mr. Trouble (Folkways, 1982)
- Tears Don't Fall No More (Folkways, 1982)
- Blues, Ballads, and Jumpin' Jazz Vol. 2 (Prestige Bluesville, 1990)
- The Unsung Blues Legend (Blues Magnet, 2000)

=== As sideman ===
- Victoria Spivey, Woman Blues (Prestige Bluesville, 1962)
- Victoria Spivey, The Queen and Her Knights (Spivey 1965)

== See also ==
- List of blues musicians
- List of jazz musicians

== Relevant literature ==
- Simon, Julia. The Inconvenient Lonnie Johnson: Blues, Race, Identity. Penn State University Press, 2022.
