= Claude Hopkins =

American jazz pianist and bandleader (1903–1984)

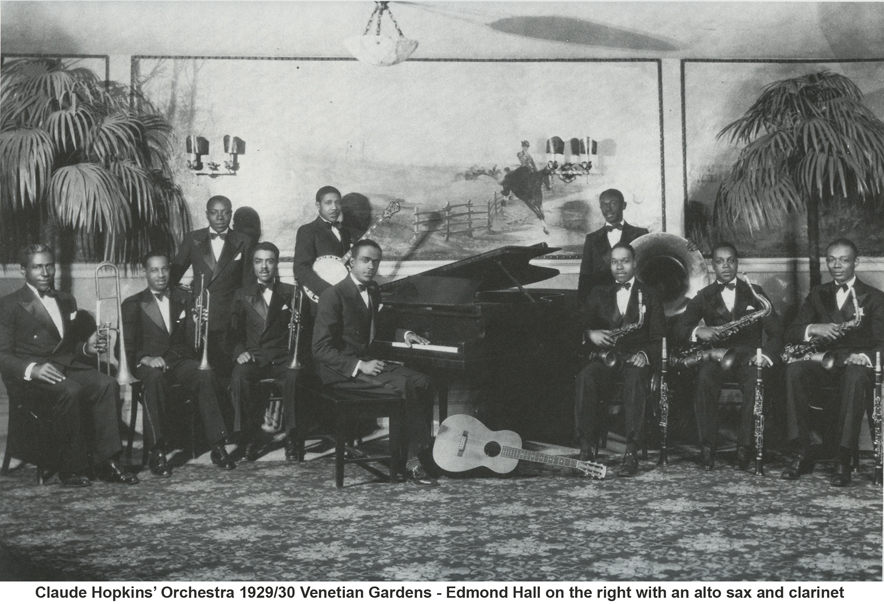

Background information
- Born: Claude Driskett Hopkins; August 24, 1903; Alexandria, Virginia, U.S
- Died: February 19, 1984 (aged 80) New York City
- Genres: Jazz
- Occupations: Musician, bandleader
- Instrument: Piano
- Years active: 1924–1984

Claude Driskett Hopkins (August 24, 1903 – February 19, 1984) was an American jazz stride pianist and bandleader.

== Biography ==
Claude Hopkins was born in Alexandria, Virginia, United States. Historians differ in respect of the actual date of his birth. His parents were on the faculty of Howard University; A talented stride piano player and arranger, he left home at the age of 21 to become a sideman with the Wilbur Sweatman Orchestra, but stayed less than a year. In 1925, he left for Europe as the musical director of La Revue nègre which starred Josephine Baker with Sidney Bechet in the band.

He returned to the US in 1927 where, based in Washington, D.C., he toured the Theatre Owners Booking Association circuit with The Ginger Snaps Revue, before heading once again for New York City where he took over the band of Charlie Skeets. At this time (1932–36), he led a Harlem band employing jazz musicians such as Edmond Hall, Fred Norman, Jabbo Smith and Vic Dickenson (although his records were arranged to feature his piano more than his band). This was his most successful period, with long residencies at the Savoy and Roseland ballrooms and at the Cotton Club. In 1932, a New York music teacher and a group of white musicians tried to have Hopkins's work censored by a city court, only for the judge to note that "it is not a crime to play seductive music". In 1937, he took his band on the road with a great deal of success.

The high-pitched vocals of Orlando Roberson (Orlando Herbert Roberson 1909–1977) were a feature of the band's work. It included Ovie Alston, Fernando Arbello, Shirley Clay, Vic Dickenson, Edmond Hall, Arville Harris, Pete Jacobs, Sylvester Lewis, Ben Smith, and Jabbo Smith.

He broke up the band in 1940 and used his arranging skills while working for several non-jazz band leaders and for CBS. In 1948/9 he led a "novelty" band briefly but took a jazz band into The Cafe Society in 1950. From 1951 until his death, he remained in New York City, working mostly as a sideman with other Dixieland bands at festivals, New York clubs, and recording. He died on February 19, 1984.

== Discography ==
=== As leader ===
- 1932-34 - The Chronological C H (Classics #699)
- 1935-35 -The Chronological C H (Classics #716)
- 1937-40 -The Chronological C H (Classics #733)
- 1955 - The golden era of Dixieland Jazz (Design)
- 1958 - Music of the Early Jazz Dances (20th Fox, 1958)
- 1960 - Yes Indeed! with Buddy Tate and Emmett Berry (Swingville, )
- 1961 - Let's Jam with Buddy Tate and Joe Thomas (Swingville, )
- 1963 - Swing Time! with Budd Johnson and Vic Dickenson (Swingville, 1963)
- 1968 - The Jazz Giants with Wild Bill Davison, Buzzy Drootin, Herb Hall, Benny Morton and Arvell Shaw (Sackville, 1968)
- 1969 - Master Jazz Piano Vol. 1 (Mater Jazz Records)
- 1972 - Soliloquy (Sackville, 1972)
- 1972 - Crazy Fingers (Chiaroscuro, 1973)
- 1974 - Safari Stomp (Black and Blue, 1974)
- 1976 - Jazz Piano Masters: Live at the New School (Chiaroscuro, 1977)

=== As sideman ===
With Red Allen

- Jazz at the Metropole Cafe with Cozy Cole, Charlie Shavers (Bethlehem, 1955)
- At Newport with Kid Ory, Jack Teagarden (Verve, 1957)

With Cozy Cole

- After Hours with Jimmy McPartland (Grand Award, 1956)
- Cozy Cole and His Big Seven (Grand Award, 1958
- Caravan (Grand Award, 1959)
- Cozy Cole and Other All-Time Jazz Stars (Colortone, 1959)

With Bud Freeman

- The Bud Freeman All-Stars featuring Shorty Baker (Swingville, 1960)

With Coleman Hawkins

- Things Ain't What They Used to Be (Swingville, 1961)
- Years Ago (Prestige, 1964)
- Dear Old Southland (Membran, 2005)

With Lonnie Johnson

- Blues by Lonnie Johnson (Bluesville, 1960)

With Ma Rainey

- Blame It on the Blues (Milestone, 1969)
