= Shorty Baker =

American jazz trumpeter (1914–1966)

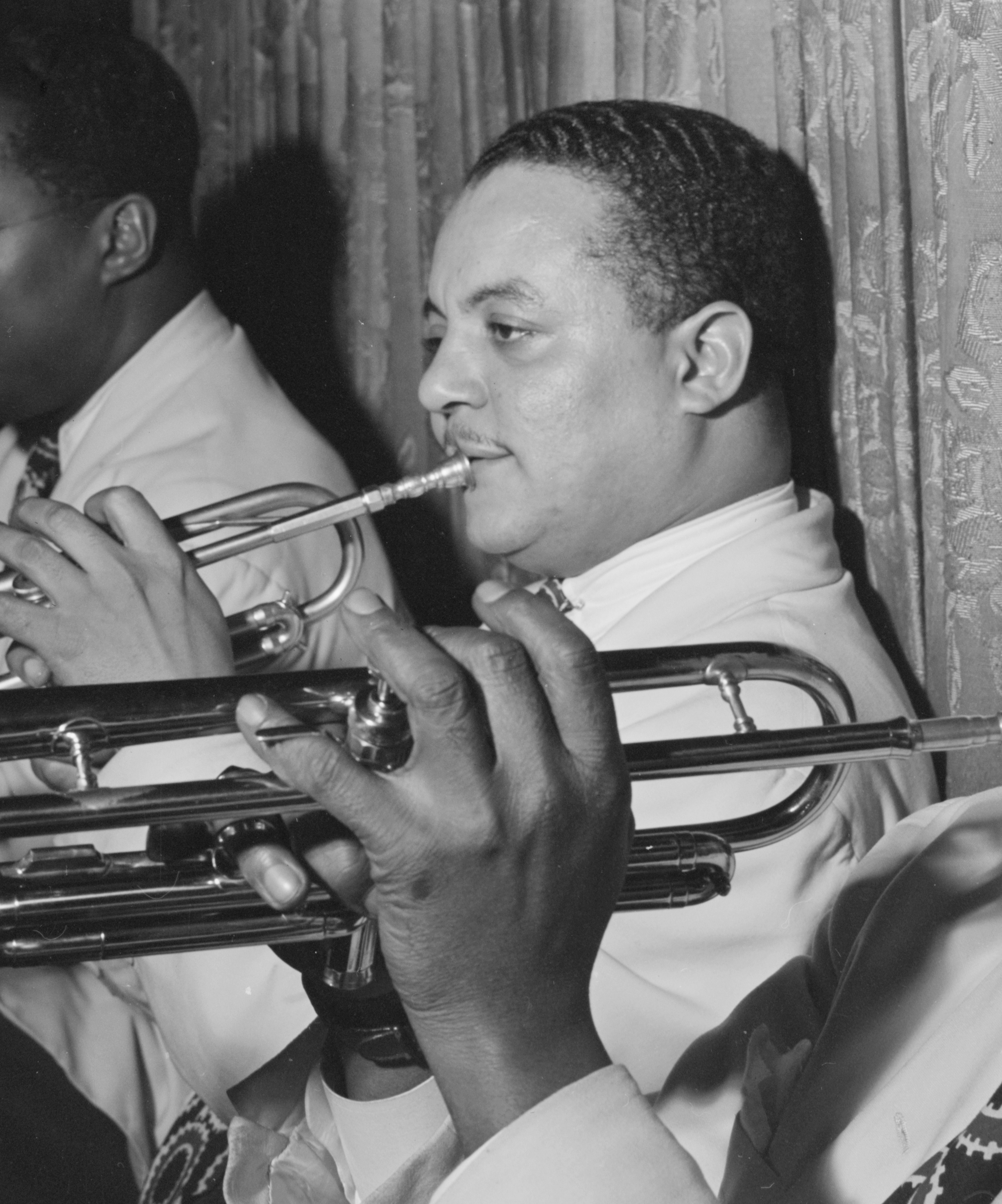
- Baker in 1946; with him are Franc Williams (background) and Cat Anderson (foreground)

Background information
- Born: Harold Baker; May 26, 1914; St. Louis, Missouri, U.S.
- Died: November 8, 1966 (aged 52) New York City, U.S.
- Genre: Jazz
- Occupation: Musician
- Instrument: Trumpet
- Years active: 1930s–1960s
- Labels: King; Swingville; Jazz Archives
- Formerly of: Don Redman; Teddy Wilson; Andy Kirk; Duke Ellington; Johnny Hodges
- Spouse: Mary Lou Williams (m. 1942; sep. 1944)

Harold "Shorty" Baker (May 26, 1914, in St. Louis, Missouri – November 8, 1966) was an American jazz trumpeter.

Baker began on drums but switched to the trumpet during his teens. He started his career on riverboats and played with Don Redman in the mid-1930s. He also worked with Teddy Wilson and Andy Kirk before joining Duke Ellington. He married Kirk's pianist, Mary Lou Williams, and although the two separated shortly thereafter, they never officially divorced.

Baker worked on and off in Duke Ellington's Orchestra from 1942 to 1962. He also worked with Johnny Hodges's group in the early 1950s, during the period when Hodges was not a member of Ellington's orchestra.

He died of throat cancer in New York City at the age of 52.

== Discography ==
=== As leader/co-leader ===
- 1958.09: The Broadway Beat (King, 1959)
- 1960.05: The Bud Freeman All-Stars featuring Shorty Baker (Swingville, 1960) – with Bud Freeman
- 1960.05: Summer Concert 1960 (Jazz Archives, 1960) – as the Bud Freeman / Shorty Baker All-Stars
- 1961.01: Shorty & Doc (Swingville, 1961) – with Doc Cheatham

=== As sideman ===
With Duke Ellington

With Johnny Hodges

- 1950: The Rabbit (Vogue, 1950)
- 1951: Caravan (Prestige)
- 1954: Johnny Hodges (Norgran, 1954), reissued as Used to Be Duke (Norgran, 1956)
- 1955: Dance Bash (Norgran, 1955), reissued as Perdido (Norgran/Verve)
- 1957: The Big Sound (Verve, 1957)
- 1959–60: A Smooth One (Verve, 1960)
- 1961: Johnny Hodges with Billy Strayhorn and the Orchestra (Verve, 1962)

With Billy Strayhorn

- 1959: Cue for Saxophone (Felsted, 1959)
