= Chris Albertson =

Music journalist, writer and record producer

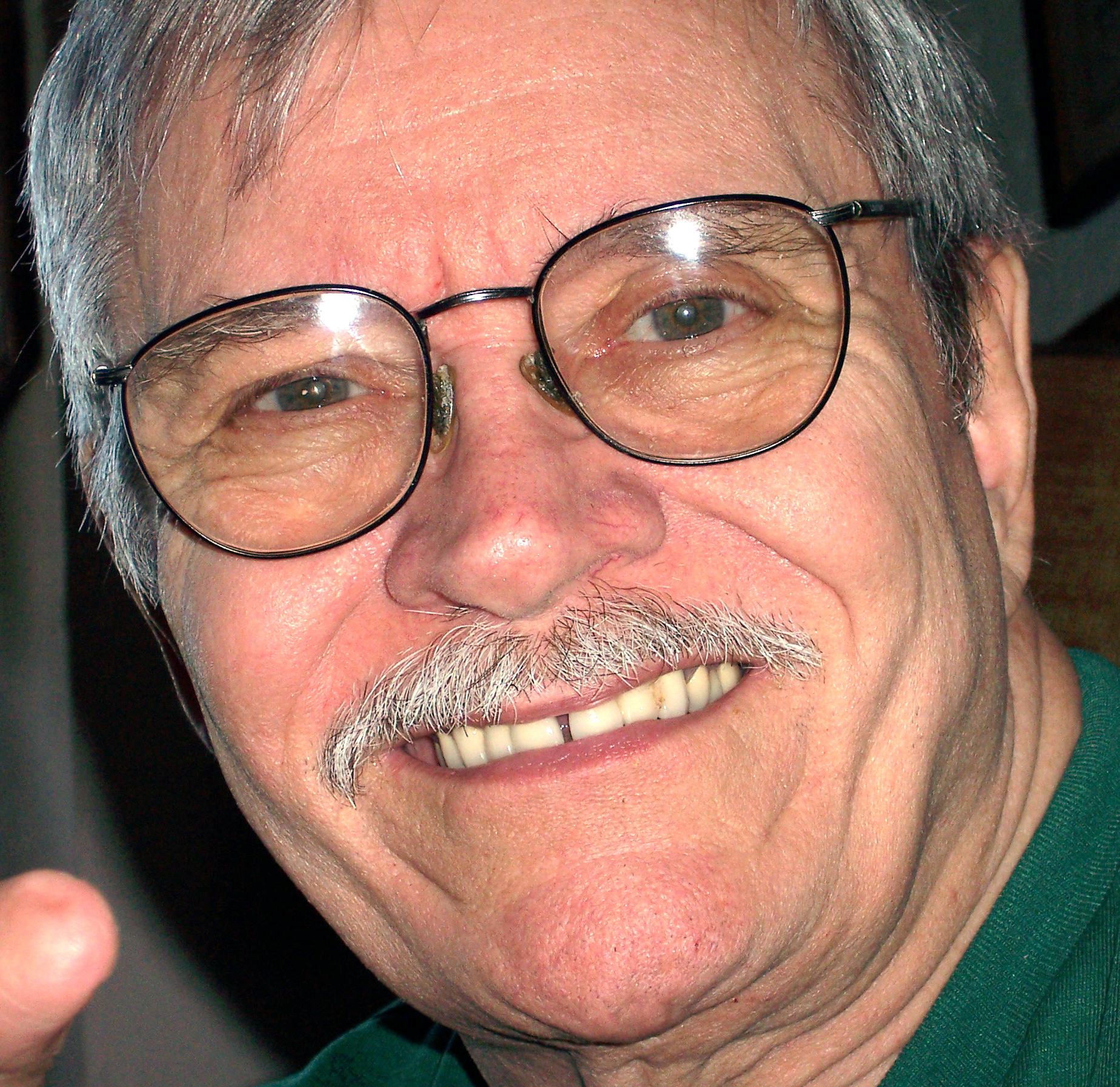
- 2006 photo

Background information
- Born: Christiern Gunnar Albertson; October 18, 1931; Reykjavík, Iceland
- Origin: Copenhagen, Denmark
- Died: April 24, 2019 (aged 87) Manhattan, New York City, U.S.
- Genres: Jazz and Blues
- Occupations: Writer, historian, record producer
- Years active: 1948–2019

Christiern Gunnar Albertson (October 18, 1931 – April 24, 2019) was a New York City-based jazz journalist, writer and record producer.

== Early life ==
Albertson was born in Reykjavík, Iceland, on October 18, 1931, but his father left the family before he was a year old. Yvonne, his mother, married three more times. He was educated in Iceland, Denmark and England before studying commercial art in Copenhagen.

In 1947, while living in Copenhagen, Albertson listened by chance to a Bessie Smith recording on radio; it led to an abiding interest in jazz and blues music. "We found magic in such names as Kid Ory, King Oliver, Johnny Dodds, Bessie Smith and Ma Rainey," he wrote on his Stomp Off blog in 2010.

On his home tape machine, Albertson recorded visiting British New Orleans revivalists Ken Colyer, Chris Barber and Lonnie Donegan in 1953. These recordings were subsequently released on the Danish Storyville Records and British Tempo Records labels.

== Career ==
In 1957, after two years as a disc jockey for Armed Forces Radio at Keflavík Air Base, in Iceland, Albertson migrated to the United States, initially working for radio stations in Philadelphia. At WCAU (a CBS affiliate) and WHAT-FM, a 24-hour jazz station, he conducted interviews, including one with Lester Young, one of only two extant with the tenor saxophonist. He was naturalised as an American citizen in 1963.

In 1960–61, Albertson was employed by Riverside Records' Bill Grauer as a producer. In this capacity, he arranged and recorded the last sessions of blues singer Ida Cox (whom he brought out of retirement) and boogie-woogie pianist Meade Lux Lewis, and supervised the label's 'Living Legends' series of location recordings. The initial albums in this series were made in New Orleans and featured such early jazz musicians as pianist Sweet Emma Barrett, clarinetist Louis Cottrell, Jr., trumpeters Percy Humphrey and Kid Thomas, blues duo Billie and De de Pierce, and trombonist Jim Robinson. He continued the series in Chicago, with performances by Lil Armstrong, Alberta Hunter, Little Brother Montgomery, and Earl Hines.

Albertson subsequently worked as producer for Prestige Records, supervising sessions by, among others, guitarist/singer Lonnie Johnson, whom he had pulled from obscurity while working in Philadelphia. He also founded his own production company, supervising sessions with Howard McGhee, Roy Eldridge, Bud Freeman, Ray Bryant, and Elmer Snowden.

In the mid-1960s, Albertson worked at NYC radio station WNEW, leaving there for Pacifica Radio's NY station WBAI, where he eventually became General Manager. In 1967, he worked for the BBC in London, advising them on how to adapt their radio programs for sale in North America.

In 1971, Albertson co-produced and hosted The Jazz Set, a weekly television program that was aired from coast to coast by Public Broadcasting Service (PBS) Public television and featured such guests as Charles Mingus, Bill Evans, Randy Weston, Jimmy Heath, and Ray Bryant.

At this time, he was also producing reissues for Columbia Records, including the complete Bessie Smith LP sets. His work on these albums won Albertson 1971 two Grammy awards (one in the Best Album Notes category for "The World's Greatest Blues Singer" and a Grammy Trustees Award), a Billboard Trendsetter Award and the Montreux Jazz Festival's Grand Prix du Disque.

His standard work, Bessie, a biography of Bessie Smith, first appeared in 1972, with a revised and expanded version published by Yale University Press in 2003. The revised biography was inducted into the Blues Foundation's Blues Hall of Fame in the Classic of Blues Literature Hall of Fame category in May 2012. In 2015, HBO premiered a biopic, Bessie, starring Queen Latifah in the title role, but Albertson's book was not credited as its basis.

Albertson wrote television documentaries, including The Story of Jazz and My Castle's Rocking (a bio-documentary on Alberta Hunter), as well as articles and reviews for various publications, including Saturday Review and Down Beat. He was a contributing editor for Stereo Review magazine for 28 years.

Albertson died at age 87 on April 24, 2019 in his Manhattan home. The New York Times said, “His death was confirmed by Gary King, a longtime friend, who found Mr. Albertson's body. No cause was given, but he had been ill for some time, Mr. King said.”
