= Budd Johnson =

American jazz saxophonist and clarinetist (1910–1984)

Background information
- Born: Albert J. Johnson III; December 14, 1910; Dallas, Texas, U.S.
- Died: October 20, 1984 (aged 73) Kansas City, Missouri, U.S.
- Genres: Jazz
- Occupation: Musician
- Instruments: Tenor saxophone, soprano saxophone, clarinet
- Years active: 1920s–1970s
- Label: Atlantic
- Formerly of: Earl Hines, Ben Webster, Benny Goodman, Big Joe Turner, Coleman Hawkins, Dizzy Gillespie, Duke Ellington, Quincy Jones, Count Basie, Billie Holiday

Albert J. "Budd" Johnson III (December 14, 1910 – October 20, 1984) was an American jazz saxophonist and clarinetist who worked extensively with, among others, Ben Webster, Benny Goodman, Big Joe Turner, Coleman Hawkins, Dizzy Gillespie, Duke Ellington, Quincy Jones, Count Basie, Billie Holiday and, especially, Earl Hines.

== Life and career ==
Johnson initially played drums and piano before switching to tenor saxophone. In the 1920s, he performed in Texas and parts of the Midwest, working with Jesse Stone among others. Johnson had his recording debut while working with Louis Armstrong's band in 1932 to 1933, but he is more known for his work, over many years, with Earl Hines. It is contended that he and Billy Eckstine, Hines' long-term collaborator, led Hines to hire "modernists" in the birth of bebop, which came largely out of the Hines band. Johnson was also an early figure in the bebop era, doing sessions with Coleman Hawkins in 1944. Johnson was a key figure in the first bebop group on 52nd Street in NYC, which played at the Onyx Club (1944) and featured Johnson, Dizzy Gillespie, George Wallington (pn), Oscar Pettiford (bs) and Max Roach (drs). Johnson urged Gillespie to write out his melodic ideas for 2 horns (trumpet and saxophone) to play in unison, a sound which became the signature style of small-group bebop. In the 1950s he led his own group, and did session work for Atlantic Records – he is the featured tenor saxophone soloist on Ruth Brown's hit "Teardrops from My Eyes". In the mid-1960s, he began working and recording again with Hines. His association with Hines is his longest lasting and most significant. In 1975, he began working with the New York Jazz Repertory Orchestra. He was inducted into the Big Band and Jazz Hall of Fame in 1993. His grandson, Albert Johnson (a.k.a. Prodigy), was a member of the hip-hop duo Mobb Deep.

He died of a heart attack in Kansas City at the age of 73.

== Discography ==
=== As leader/coleader ===
- 1958: Blues a la Mode (Felsted)
- 1960: Budd Johnson and the Four Brass Giants (Riverside) with Ray Nance, Clark Terry, Nat Adderley and Harry Edison
- 1960: Let's Swing! (Swingville)
- 1963: French Cookin' (Argo)
- 1964: Ya! Ya! (Argo)
- 1964: Off the Wall (Argo) with Joe Newman
- 1970: Ya! Ya! (Black & Blue)
- 1974: The Dirty Old Men (Black & Blue) with Earl Hines – rereleased as Mr. Bechet
- 1978: In Memory of a Very Dear Friend (Dragon)
- 1984: The Ole Dude & The Fundance Kid (Uptown) with Phil Woods

=== As sideman ===
With Cannonball Adderley

- Domination (Capitol, 1965)

With Count Basie

- The Legend (Roulette, 1961)
- Kansas City 8: Get Together (1979)

With Ruth Brown

- Miss Rhythm (Atlantic, 1959)

With Benny Carter

- 'Live and Well in Japan! (Pablo Live, 1978)

With Roy Eldridge

- What It's All About (Pablo, 1976)

With Duke Ellington and Count Basie

- First Time! The Count Meets the Duke (Columbia, 1961)

With Gil Evans

- Great Jazz Standards (Pacific Jazz, 1959)
- Out of the Cool (Impulse!, 1960)

With Dizzy Gillespie

- The Complete RCA Victor Recordings (Bluebird, 1937–1949 [1995])
- Dee Gee Days: The Savoy Sessions (Savoy, 1951–1952 [1976])
- Jazz Recital (Norgran, 1955)

With Coleman Hawkins

- Rainbow Mist (Delmark, 1944 [1992]) compilation of Apollo recordings

With Earl Hines

- The Father Jumps (Bluebird, 1939–1945 [1975])

With Claude Hopkins

- Swing Time! (Swingville, 1963) with Vic Dickenson

With Etta Jones

- Lonely and Blue (Prestige, 1962)

With Quincy Jones

- The Birth of a Band! (Mercury, 1959)
- The Great Wide World of Quincy Jones (Mercury, 1959)
- I Dig Dancers (Mercury, 1960)
- Quincy Plays for Pussycats (Mercury, 1959–65 [1965])

With Jimmy McGriff

- The Big Band (Solid State, 1966)

With Carmen McRae

- Something to Swing About (Kapp, 1959)

With Bud Powell

- Earl Bud Powell, Vol. 1: Early Years of a Genius, 44–48 (1948)

With Carrie Smith

- Carrie Smith (West 54 Records, 1978)

With Jimmy Smith

- Monster (Verve, 1965)

With Sonny Stitt

- Broadway Soul (Colpix, 1965)

With Clark Terry

- Color Changes (Candid, 1960)
- Clark Terry Plays the Jazz Version of All American (Moodsville, 1962)

With Ben Webster

- Ben Webster and Associates (Verve, 1959)

With Randy Weston

- Uhuru Afrika (Roulette, 1960)
- Highlife (Colpix, 1963)
- Tanjah (Polydor, 1973)

=== As arranger ===
With Jimmy Witherspoon

- Goin' to Kansas City Blues (RCA Victor, 1958) with Jay McShann
