= Joe Thomas (trumpeter) =

American jazz musician (1909–1984)

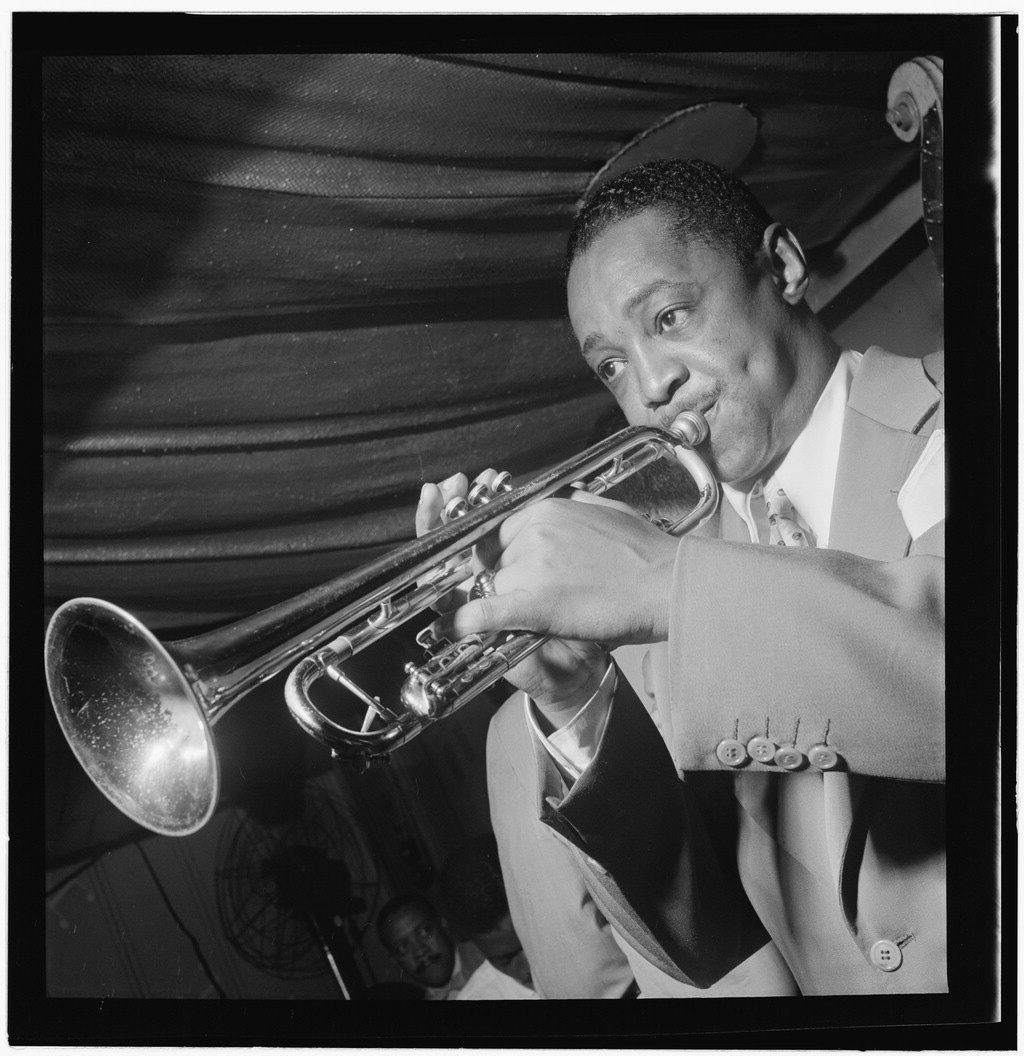
Portrait of Joe Thomas blowing Trumpet

Joseph Lewis Thomas (July 24, 1909 – August 6, 1984) was an American swing jazz trumpeter, who was born in Webster Groves, Missouri, and died in New York City, New York.

== Biography ==
He was born in Webster Groves, Missouri, United States, and started his music career at the age of 19 with bandleader Cecil Scott in 1928, and played throughout the Midwest before moving to New York in 1934, where he became one of the most sought-after trumpeters of the 1930s and 1940s. Those he worked with include Fletcher Henderson's Orchestra (1934–37), Fats Waller, Benny Carter (1939–40), Joe Sullivan and Teddy Wilson's Sextet (1942–43), Claude Hopkins and many others. He featured in Art Kane's iconic 1958 photograph A Great Day in Harlem.

== Discography ==
With Buck Clayton

- How Hi the Fi (Columbia, 1954)
- Jumpin' at the Woodside (Columbia, 1955)

With Rex Stewart

- Henderson Homecoming (United Artists, 1959)
- Rex Stewart and the Ellingtonians (Riverside, 1960)

With others

- Vic Dickenson & Joe Thomas, Mainstream (Atlantic, 1959)
- Coleman Hawkins, Coleman Hawkins All Stars (Swingville, 1960)
- Fletcher Henderson All Stars, The Big Reunion (Jazztone, 1958)
- Claude Hopkins, Let's Jam (Swingville, 1961)
