= Earle Warren =

American jazz musician (1914–1994)

Earle Warren (born Earl Ronald Warren; July 1, 1914 – June 4, 1994) was an American saxophonist. He was part of the Count Basie Orchestra from 1937.

== Early life ==
Warren was born in Springfield, Ohio, on July 1, 1914. "He played piano, banjo, and ukulele in a family band before taking up C-melody, tenor, and finally alto saxophone."

== Later life and career ==
When Warren became professional in 1930, he added an "e" to the end of his first name to make it different from other jazz musicians named "Earl". In his early career, he toured the Midwest as a sideman, and led his own bands. He joined the Count Basie Orchestra in 1937, playing baritone and alto saxophones initially, and then being lead altoist and occasional clarinettist and vocalist until 1945. He led bands and occasionally reunited with Basie towards the end of the decade. After managing some bands, he joined trumpeter Buck Clayton in 1957.

Warren appeared in Born to Swing, the 1972 film about former members of Basie's band. From 1973, Warren performed often at the West End jazz club in New York City, leading a band called The Countsmen. He lived part of the time in Switzerland until his return to Springfield in 1992, where he spent the final two years of his life. He died there on June 4, 1994.

== Discography ==
With Count Basie

- The Original American Decca Recordings (GRP, 1937-39 [1992])

With Buck Clayton

- Songs for Swingers (Columbia, 1958)
- Copenhagen Concert (SteepleChase, 1959 [1979])
- One for Buck (Columbia, 1961)
- Jam Session #1 (Chiaroscuro, 2002)
- Jam Session #2 (Chiaroscuro, 2002)
- Jam Session #3 (Chiaroscuro, 2022)

With Milt Jackson

- Big Bags (Riverside, 1962)

With Jay McShann

- The Big Apple Bash (Atlantic, 1979)

With Buddy Tate

- Swinging Like Tate (Felsted, 1958)

With Teri Thornton

- Devil May Care (Riverside, 1961)

With Milt Buckner

- Send Me Softly (Capitol, 1957)
