= The Master's Touch =

Studio album by Lester Young
- Released: 1993
- Recorded: 1944
- Genre: jazz
- Length: 54:05
- Label: Savoy Records

Professional ratings
Review scores
Source	Rating
Allmusic	3/5 stars

The Master's Touch is a jazz album by Lester Young.

== Track listing ==
1. "Crazy Over J-Z" (Take 2) Lester Young -(2:49)
2. "Crazy Over J-Z" (Take 3) Lester Young -(2:43)
3. I Don't Stand a Ghost of a Chance With You [Take 2] Bing Crosby, Ned Washington, Victor Young, Lester Young -(3:22)
4. "Ding Dong" (Take 2) Lester Young -(2:27)
5. "Ding Dong" (Take 3) Lester Young -(2:28)
6. "Blues 'N' Bells" (Take 2) Lester Young -(2:24)
7. "Blues 'N' Bells" [(Take 3) Lester Young -(2:24)
8. "Back Home Again In Indiana" [Orig. TK2] Ballard MacDonald, James F. Hanley, Lester Young -(2:56)
9. "Basie English" Johnny Guarnieri, Lester Young -(3:02)
10. "Salute to Fats" (Short Take 2) Johnny Guarnieri, Lester Young -(1:19)
11. "Salute to Fats" (Orig. Take 5) Johnny Guarnieri Lester Young -(3:01)
12. "Exercise in Swing" Johnny Guarnieri, Lester Young -(3:11)
13. "Exercise in Swing" (Orig. Take 4) Johnny Guarnieri, Lester Young -(3:03)
14. "Circus in Rhythm" (Orig. Take 2) Earle Warren, Lester Young -(3:15)
15. "Tush" (Orig. Take 2) Dicky Wells, Lester Young -(2:55)
16. "Circus in Rhythm" (Take 3) Earle Warren, Lester Young -(3:05)
17. "Poor Little Plaything" (Take 3)Earle Warren, Lester Young -(2:57)
18. "Exercise in Swing" (Take 2) Johnny Guarnieri, Lester Young -(2:49)
19. "Salute to Fats" (Take 4) Johnny Guarnieri, Lester Young -(1:00)
20. "Salute to Fats" (Take 3) Johnny Guarnieri, Lester Young –(2:55)

== Personnel ==
- Lester Young- tenor saxophone
- Harry "Sweets" Edison- trumpet
- Al Killian- trumpet
- Ed Lewis- trumpet
- Joe Newman- trumpet
- Ted Donnelly- trombone
- Eli Robinson- trombone
- Lou Taylor- trombone
- Dickie Wells- trombone
- Jimmy Powell- alto saxophone
- Earl Warren- alto saxophone, voice, arranger
- Buddy Tate- tenor saxophone
- Rudy Rutherford- baritone saxophone
- Clyde Hart- piano
- Freddie Green- guitar
- Rodney Richardson- bass
- Jo Jones- drums
- Tadd Dameron, Dick Flanagan, Dixky Wells- arrangers

== Sources ==
Gridley, Mark C. Jazz Styles: History & Analysis. 9th N.J.: Prentice Hall, 2006. Print.
