= Buck Clayton Jams Benny Goodman =

Studio album by Buck Clayton's All Stars
- Released: 1955
- Recorded: December 16, 1953 and August 13, 1954
- Genre: Jazz
- Length: 44:32
- Label: Columbia
- Producer: George Avakian, John Hammond

Buck Clayton chronology
Buck Meets Ruby (1954)	Buck Clayton Jams Benny Goodman (1955)	Jumpin' at the Woodside (1955)

Buck Clayton Jams Benny Goodman is an album by trumpeter Buck Clayton performing tunes associated with Benny Goodman. The album was recorded in 1953 and 1954 and released by Columbia.

Professional ratings
Review scores
Source	Rating
Allmusic	3/5 stars

== Track listing ==
1. "Christopher Columbus" (Chu Berry, Andy Razaf) – 25:46
2. "Don't Be That Way" (Benny Goodman, Edgar Sampson) – 9:26
3. "Undecided" (Sid Robin, Charlie Shavers) – 9:30
- Recorded in NYC on December 16, 1953 (track 1) and August 13, 1954 (tracks 2 & 3)

== Personnel ==
- Buck Clayton – trumpet
- Joe Newman – trumpet
- Henderson Chambers (track 1), Urbie Green, Trummy Young (tracks 2 & 3) – trombone
- Lem Davis – alto saxophone
- Julian Dash (track 1), Coleman Hawkins (tracks 2 & 3) – tenor saxophone
- Charles Fowlkes – baritone saxophone
- Billy Kyle (tracks 2 & 3), Sir Charles Thompson (track 1) – piano, celeste
- Freddie Green – guitar
- Milt Hinton (tracks 2 & 3), Walter Page (track 1) – double bass
- Jo Jones – drums
