= Pat Jenkins =

American jazz trumpeter (1914–2006)

- Born: Sydney Francis Jenkins; December 25, 1914; Norfolk, Virginia, U.S.
- Died: September 2, 2006 (aged 91)
- Genres: Jazz
- Occupation: Musician
- Instrument: Trumpet
- Years active: 1930s–1970s
- Formerly of: Al Cooper & His Savoy Sultans; Buddy Tate

Sydney Francis "Pat" Jenkins (December 25, 1914 – September 2, 2006) was an American jazz trumpeter, best known for his associations with Al Cooper and Buddy Tate.

Jenkins was born in Norfolk, Virginia, and moved to New York City when he was nineteen. He was a founding member of Al Cooper's Savoy Sultans in 1937 and was a regular member until 1944, mostly playing trumpet but also singing on the recording "We'd Rather Jump than Swing". He entered into military service near the end of World War II, and after his discharge worked with Wynonie Harris and Big Joe Turner, then with Tab Smith for the rest of the 1940s. After leading his own ensemble for a short time, he began working with Buddy Tate in 1951; he would work with Tate on and off until 1976, including with Jimmy Rushing in 1954 and in the documentary L'aventure du jazz in 1970. He was a member of Tate's house band at the Celebrity Club in New York from the mid-1950s to the mid-1970s.

== Discography ==
With Buddy Tate

- Swinging Like Tate (Felsted, 1958)
- Tate's Date (Swingville, 1960)

== External link ==
- Pat Jenkins at AllMusic
