= Heckler's Hop =

Compilation album by Roy Eldridge
- Released: December 7, 1995
- Recorded: 1936–1939
- Genre: Jazz
- Length: 66:13
- Label: Hep Records
- Producer: Alastair Robertson

Heckler's Hop is a 1995 compilation album collecting work from the mid- to late-1930s by jazz trumpet-player Roy Eldridge. Released by Hep Records, the album is listed as one of the "Core Collection" albums in The Penguin Guide to Jazz and, by Allmusic, "essential for fans of Jazz trumpet."

== Context ==
From 1930 to 1935 Eldridge was establishing his reputation as jazz musician in New York City, playing with various established bands in the area as well as recording and broadcasting solo and in conjunction with other musicians. In October 1935, Eldridge joined Fletcher Henderson's Orchestra, playing lead trumpet and occasionally singing before, in early September 1936, he moved to Chicago to form an octet with older brother Joe Eldridge playing saxophone and arranging. The ensemble set up at The Three Deuces, boasting nightly broadcasts. Fed up with the racism he had encountered in the music industry, Eldridge quit playing in 1938 to study radio engineering, but was soon back to performing, forming a ten-piece band in 1939 that he set up at New York's Arcadia Ballroom. The songs on this compilation were recorded between 1936 and 1939.

== Songs ==
The album collects 22 songs from a broad range of composers. Jazz drummer Gene Krupa is singled out for featuring on the first four tracks, while trumpeter Bill Berry receives featured credit for is performance on "I'm Getting Sentimental Over You". 2000's Jazz 101, putting forth the album as a good sampler of Eldridge's early years, focuses on the version of jazz standard "After You've Gone", describing it as a "tour de force, full of diving and leaping, careening and careering, with notes dropped, some left hanging on the ledge of the rhythm section." Jazz biographer Donald Maggin agrees that "After You've Gone" is a "masterpiece" but adds that the title track "comes close." These two songs, along with five others which Maggin characterizes as "well above average", were recorded in early 1937.

== Critical reception ==
Professional ratings
Review scores
Source	Rating
Allmusic	favorable
Penguin Guide to Jazz	4/4 stars

The album has been critically well received. The Penguin Guide to Jazz numbers it among the "core collection" which jazz fans should possess. Allmusic recommends it for all fans of jazz as well, but asserts that is "essential for fans of jazz trumpet", writing that the compilation "captures Eldridge in wonderful form: brash, brassy, and wildly imaginative" as well as featuring "jazz giants" Chu Berry, Benny Goodman, Zutty Singleton and Helen Ward " at (or approaching) their creative peaks". The Rough Guide to Jazz describes it as "classic early Eldridge".

== Track listing ==
1. "I Hope Gabriel Likes My Music" (David Franklin) – 3:06
2. "Mutiny in the Parlor" (Edward Heyman, Vee Lawnhurst) – 3:02
3. "I'm Gonna Clap My Hands" (Eddie Farley, Mike Riley) – 2:59
4. "Swing is Here" (Chu Berry, Roy Eldridge, Gene Krupa) – 2:57
5. "Wabash Stomp" (Edgar Battle, Roy Eldridge) – 3:09
6. "Florida Stomp" (Battle, Roy Eldridge) – 2:57
7. "Heckler's Hop" (Battle, Joe Eldridge, Roy Eldridge) – 2:37
8. "Where the Lazy River Goes By" (Harold Adamson, Jimmy McHugh) – 2:33
9. "That Thing" (Roy Eldridge) – 3:01
10. "After You've Gone" (Henry Creamer, Turner Layton) – 2:59
11. "Sittin' In" (Milt Gabler) – 2:15
12. "Stardust" (Hoagy Carmichael, Mitchell Parish) – 3:59
13. "Body and Soul" (Frank Eyton, Johnny Green, Heyman, Robert Sour) – 3:56
14. "Forty Six, West Fifty Two" (Chu Berry, Gabler) – 2:36
15. "It's My Turn Now" (Sammy Cahn, Saul Chaplin) – 2:55
16. "You're a Lucky Guy" (Cahn, Chaplin) – 3:07
17. "Pluckin' the Bass" (Roy Eldridge) – 3:05
18. "I'm Getting Sentimental Over You" (George Bassman, Ned Washington) – 3:01
19. "High Society" (Walter Melrose, Porter Steele) – 3:05
20. "Muskrat Ramble" (Ray Gilbert, Kid Ory) – 2:47
21. "Who Told You I Cared?" (Bert Reisfeld, Richard A. Whiting) – 3:25
22. "Does Your Heart Beat for Me?" (Arnold Johnson, Russ Morgan, Parish) – 2:42

== Personnel ==
- Danny Barker – guitar
- Bill Berry – primary artist
- Chu Berry – tenor saxophone
- Scoops Carey – alto saxophone
- Big Sid Catlett – drums
- John Collins – guitar
- Israel Crosby – bass, tenor saxophone
- John R.T. Davies – audio mastering
- Joe Eldridge – arranger, Alto saxophone
- Roy Eldridge – primary artist, trumpet, vocals
- David "Panama" Francis – drums
- Jim Godbolt – liner notes
- Benny Goodman – clarinet
- Clyde Hart – piano
- Franz Jackson – tenor saxophone
- James P. Johnson – tenor saxophone
- Ken Kersey – piano
- Gene Krupa – drums, primary artist
- Gladys Palmer – vocals
- Truck Parham – bass, tenor saxophone
- Alastair Robertson – producer
- Eli Robinson – trombone
- Artie Shapiro – bass, tenor saxophone
- Zutty Singleton – drums
- Jess Stacy – piano
- Ted Sturgis – bass, tenor saxophone
- Art Surgery – design
- Helen Ward – vocals
- Laurel Watson – vocals
- Robert Williams – trombone
- Dave Young – tenor saxophone
