= Billy Kyle =

American jazz pianist

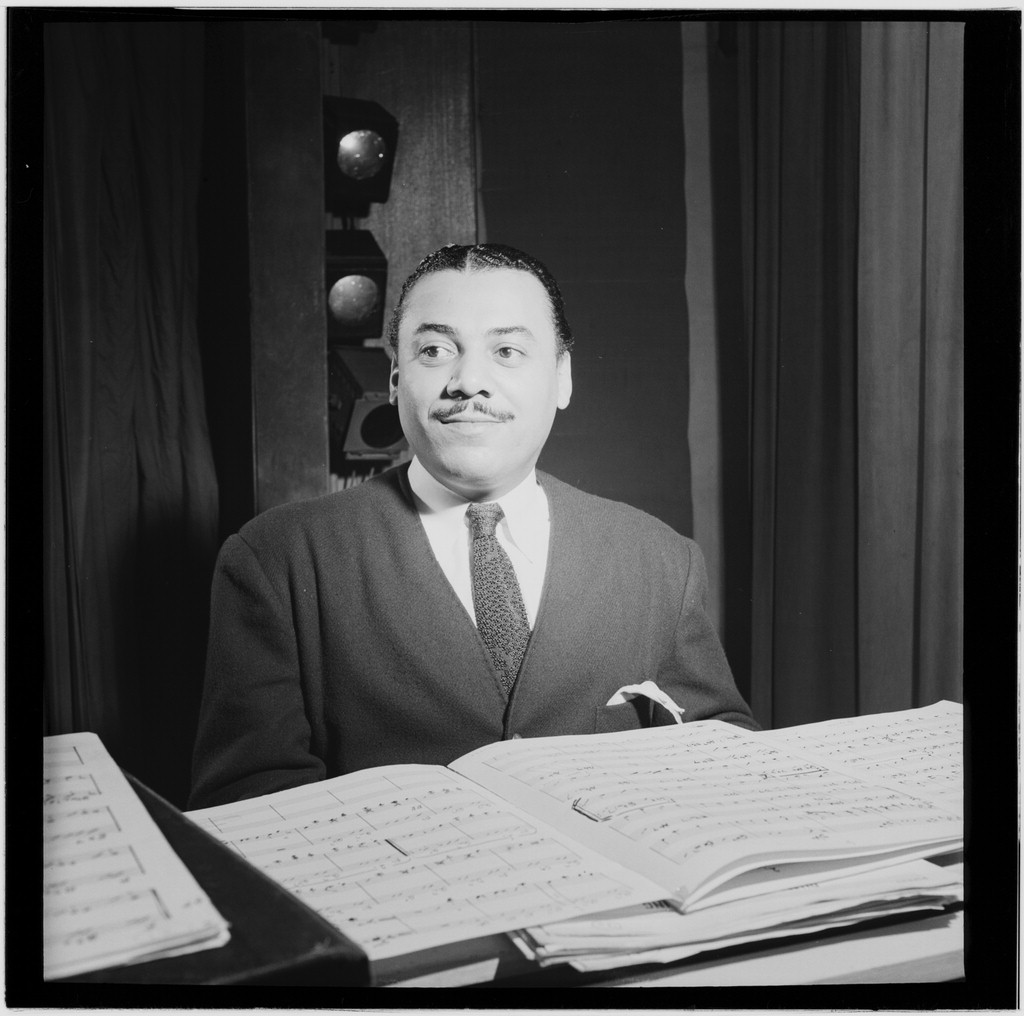
- Billy Kyle; Photography by William P. Gottlieb

Background information
- Born: William Osborne Kyle; July 14, 1914; Philadelphia, Pennsylvania, U.S.
- Died: February 23, 1966 (aged 51) Youngstown, Ohio, U.S.
- Genres: Jazz
- Occupation: Musician
- Instrument: Piano
- Years active: 1930s–1960s

William Osborne Kyle (July 14, 1914 – February 23, 1966) was an American jazz pianist. He is perhaps best known as an accompanist.

== Biography ==
Kyle was born in Philadelphia, Pennsylvania, United States. He began playing the piano in school and by the early 1930s worked with Lucky Millinder, Tiny Bradshaw and later the Mills Blue Rhythm Band. In 1938, he joined John Kirby's sextet, but was drafted in 1942. After the war, he worked with Kirby's band briefly and also worked with Sy Oliver. He then spent thirteen years as a member of Louis Armstrong's All-Stars, and performed in the 1956 musical High Society.

A fluent pianist with a light touch, Kyle always worked steadily. He died in Youngstown, Ohio.

Kyle had few opportunities to record as a leader and none during his Armstrong years, some octet and septet sides in 1937, two songs with a quartet in 1939, and outings in 1946 with a trio and an octet.

== Discography ==
=== As sideman ===
- Louis Armstrong Plays W. C. Handy (Columbia, 1954)
- Satch Plays Fats (Columbia, 1955)
- At Newport (Columbia, 1956)
- Louis and the Angels (Decca, 1957)
- Satchmo On Stage (Decca, 1957)
- Satchmo Plays King Oliver (Audio Fidelity, 1960)
- Hello, Dolly! (Kapp, 1964)
- At the Crescendo (MCA, 1973)

With others

- Dave Brubeck, Summit Sessions (Columbia, 1971)
- Buck Clayton, Buck Clayton Jams Benny Goodman (Columbia, 1955)
- Buck Clayton, Jumpin' at the Woodside (Columbia, 1955)
- Ella Fitzgerald, Ella Sings Gershwin (Decca, 1956)
- Al Hibbler, After the Lights Go Down Low (Atlantic, 1957)
- John Kirby, Biggest Little Band in the Land (DJM, 1975)
- Charlie Shavers, The Complete Charlie Shavers with Maxine Sullivan (Bethlehem, 1957)
- Rex Stewart, Rex Stewart and the Ellingtonians (Riverside, 1960)
