= Billy (I Always Dream of Bill) =

- Sheet music, 1911

Song
- Published: 1911
- Genre: Popular
- Composer(s): James Kendis, Herman Paley
- Lyricist(s): Joe Goodwin

Audio sample
- Recording of Billy (I Always Dream of Bill), performed by Ada Jones (1911): file; help

"Billy", also known as "Billy (I Always Dream of Bill)" is a song with words by Joe Goodwin and music by James Kendis and Herman Paley, written in 1911.

In 1950 it was performed by Betty Grable in the film Wabash Avenue.

== Kathy Linden version ==
"Billy"

Single by Kathy Linden

from the album That Certain Boy
- B-side: "If I Could Hold You in My Arms"
- Released: 1958
- Genre: Pop
- Length: 1:55
- Label: Felsted 8510
- Composer(s): James Kendis, Herman Paley
- Lyricist(s): Joe Goodwin

Kathy Linden singles chronology
"It's Just My Luck to Be Fifteen" (1957)	"Billy" (1958)	"You'd Be Surprised" (1958)

The most successful version of the song was performed by Kathy Linden. It reached #7 on the Billboard pop chart in 1958. The song was featured on her 1958 album, That Certain Boy.

The song features the Joe Leahy Orchestra.

The single ranked #90 on Billboard's Year-End Hot 100 singles of 1958.

== Other versions ==
- American Quartet released the first version of the song in 1911.
- Ada Jones released a version of the song as a single in 1911.
- The Orrin Tucker Orchestra featuring Wee Bonnie Baker vocals released a version of the song in 1939.
- Susan Maughan released a version of the song as part of the 1963 Four Beaux & A Belle EP.
