= Skip Hall (musician) =

American jazz musician

Archie "Skip" Hall (September 27, 1909, Portsmouth, Virginia – November 1980, Ottawa) was an American jazz arranger, pianist, and organist.

Hall studied piano under his father and lived in New York from age eight. In the late 1920s he relocated to Cleveland, where he led his own band for most of the 1930s and worked as an arranger on contract. He arranged for Jay McShann from 1940 to 1944 and played with Don Redman during World War II; in 1943 he entered military service and played in a band while stationed in England. He worked with Hot Lips Page around the year 1945 and then joined the band of Sy Oliver, who was his brother-in-law. Following this he worked with Wynonie Harris, Thelma Houston, and Jimmy Rushing before joining Buddy Tate's group in 1948; he would work with Tate for twenty years both as a performer and arranger. He also played in the 1950s and 1960s with Dicky Wells, Emmett Berry, and George James, as well as solo and with his own small groups.

== Discography ==
- Bennie Green, Hornful of Soul (Bethlehem, 1961)
- Billy Wright, Goin' Down Slow (Savoy, 1984)
- Buddy Tate, Swinging Like Tate (Felsted, 1958)
- Dicky Wells, Bones for the King (Felsted, 1958)
- Dicky Wells, Trombone Four-in-Hand (Felsted, 1959)
- Dicky Wells, The Stanley Dance Sessions (Lone Hill, 2005)
- Emmett Berry, Buddy Tate, Beauty and the Blues (Columbia, 1960)
