= Swinging Like Tate =

Studio album by Buddy Tate
- Released: 1958
- Recorded: February 12 & 26, 1958
- Studio: NYC
- Genre: Jazz
- Length: 40:29
- Label: Felsted; FAJ.7004
- Producer: Stanley Dance

Buddy Tate chronology
Swinging Like Tate (1958)	The Madison Beat (1959)

Swinging Like Tate is an album by saxophonist Buddy Tate which was recorded in 1958 and released on the Felsted label.

== Reception ==
Professional ratings
Review scores
Source	Rating
AllMusic	4/5 stars

Scott Yanow of AllMusic states, "The music overall is fine mainstream jazz of the 1950s that is easily recommended to straightahead jazz fans although little unexpected or all that memorable occurs".

== Track listing ==
1. "Bottle It" (Skip Hall) – 6:00
2. "Walk That Walk" (Dickie Wells) – 8:32
3. "Miss Sadie Brown" (Eli Robinson) – 5:57
4. "Moon Eyes" (Buddy Tate) – 7:38
5. "Rockin Steve" (Buck Clayton) – 7:00
6. "Rompin with Buck" (Tate) – 5:22

== Personnel ==
- Buddy Tate – tenor saxophone, clarinet
- Buck Clayton (tracks 4–6), Pat Jenkins (tracks 1–3) – trumpet
- Dicky Wells (tracks 4–6), Eli Robinson (tracks 1–3) – trombone
- Ben Richardson – alto saxophone, clarinet (tracks 1–3)
- Earle Warren – alto saxophone, baritone saxophone (tracks 4–6)
- Skip Hall – piano
- Everett Barksdale (tracks 1–3), Chauncey "Lord" Westbrook (tracks 4–6) – guitar
- Aaron Bell (tracks 4–6), Joe Benjamin (tracks 1–3) – bass
- Jo Jones (tracks 4–6), Herbie Lovelle (tracks 1–3) – drums
