= Gene Ramey =

American jazz musician (1913–1984)

Gene Ramey (April 4, 1913 – December 8, 1984) was an American jazz double bassist.

Ramey was born in Austin, Texas, United States, and played trumpet in college, but switched to contrabass when playing with George Corley's Royal Aces, The Moonlight Serenaders, and Terrence Holder. In 1932, he moved to Kansas City, Missouri and took up the bass, studying with Walter Page. He became a fixture on the Kansas City swing jazz scene in the 1930s, and played with Jay McShann's orchestra from 1938 to 1943.

In 1944, he moved to New York City, where he played with Lester Young, Count Basie, Ben Webster, Coleman Hawkins, Charlie Parker, Hot Lips Page, Horace Silver, Thelonious Monk (as a member of Monk’s first trio in 1947, together with drummer Art Blakey), and Miles Davis. He transitioned into the bebop style ably, but also continued to play in more swing-oriented outfits. Later in his life he toured Europe with Buck Clayton, and played with Muggsy Spanier, Teddy Wilson, Dick Wellstood, Jimmy Rushing, and Eddie Vinson, in addition to doing several reunion gigs with McShann. In 1976, he moved back to Texas, playing occasionally up until his death from a heart attack in 1984.

== Discography ==
=== As sideman ===
With Buck Clayton

- Songs for Swingers (Columbia, 1958)
- Buck & Buddy (Swingville, 1960)
- One for Buck (Columbia, 1961)
- Buck & Buddy Blow the Blues (Swingville, 1961)
- Copenhagen Concert (SteepleChase, 1979)

With others

- Buster Bailey, All About Memphis (Felsted, 1958)
- Count Basie, Basie Jazz (Clef, 1954)
- Count Basie, The Swinging Count! (Clef, 1956)
- Johnny Costa, The Amazing Johnny Costa (Savoy, 1955)
- Vic Dickenson and Joe Thomas, Mainstream (Atlantic, 1958)
- Bob Dylan, Mixed-Up Confusion (Columbia single, 1963)
- Jimmy Forrest, All the Gin Is Gone (Delmark, 1965) also from same Dec. 1959 session, Black Forrest (Delmark, 1972)
- Stan Getz, Stan Getz Quartets (Prestige, 1955)
- Dexter Gordon, Dexter Rides Again (Savoy, 1958)
- Illinois Jacquet, Groovin' with Jacquet (Clef, 1956)
- J. J. Johnson, J. J. Johnson's Jazz Quintets (Columbia, Savoy, 1961)
- Sonny Rollins, Sonny Rollins, Volume 1 (Blue Note, 1957)
- Jimmy Rushing, Lullabies (Columbia, 1959)
- Zoot Sims, The Brothers (Prestige, 1949)
- Lennie Tristano, Lennie Tristano (Atlantic, 1955)
- Teddy Wilson, I Got Rhythm (Verve, 1956)
- Jimmy Witherspoon, Goin' to Kansas City Blues (RCA Victor, 1958)
- Lester Young, Pres (Norgran, 1956)
- Lester Young, Lester Swings Again (Norgran, 1956)
- The Lester Young - Teddy Wilson Quartet, Pres and Teddy (Verve, recorded 1956, released 1959)

== Other sources ==
- Scott Yanow, Gene Ramey at AllMusic
