= Trombone Four-in-Hand =

Studio album by Dicky Wells
- Released: 1959
- Recorded: April 21 and 22, 1959
- Studio: NYC
- Genre: Jazz
- Length: 39:45
- Label: Felsted; FAJ.7009
- Producer: Stanley Dance

Dicky Wells chronology
Chatter Jazz (1959)	Trombone Four-in-Hand (1959)	Lonesome Road (1981)

Trombone Four-in-Hand is an album by trombonist Dicky Wells which was recorded in 1959 and released on the Felsted label.

== Reception ==
Professional ratings
Review scores
Source	Rating
AllMusic	4/5 stars

Ken Dryden of AllMusic states: "Dicky Wells is one of the most important swing trombonists, though he is better known for his work as a sideman than as a leader. But when he got the occasional opportunity to lead a record date, which was all too infrequent, he made the most of it. ... Spirited solos and tight horn ensembles are common features throughout most of the session".

== Track listing ==
All compositions by Dicky Wells except where noted.

1. "Blue Moon" (Richard Rodgers, Lorenz Hart) – 3:38
2. "Airlift" (Skip Hall) – 6:41
3. "It's All Over Now" (Harry White) – 4:02
4. "Wine-O Junction" – 5:38
5. "Heavy Duty" – 6:40
6. "Short, Tall, Fat and Small" – 6:31
7. "Girl Hunt" – 6:35

== Personnel ==
- Dicky Wells – trombone
- Vic Dickenson, George Matthews, Benny Morton – trombone
- Skip Hall – piano, organ
- Everett Barksdale – guitar, electric bass
- Kenny Burrell – guitar (tracks 1–4)
- Major Holley – bass (tracks 5–7)
- Herbie Lovelle – drums
