= Unbroken (Buddy Tate album) =

Studio album by The Buddy Tate Celebrity Club Orchestra
- Released: 1970
- Recorded: June 30 and July 1, 1970
- Studio: MPS Studio Villingen, Black Forest, Germany
- Genre: Jazz
- Label: MPS; 15050 ST
- Producer: Hans J. Mauerer, Joachim E. Berendt

Buddy Tate chronology
| Buddy Tate Celebrity Club Orchestra Vol. 2 (1968) | Unbroken (1970) | Buddy Tate & Wild Bill Davis (1972) |

Unbroken is an album by saxophonist Buddy Tate's Celebrity Club Orchestra which was recorded in Germany in 1970 and released on the MPS label.

== Reception ==
Professional ratings
Review scores
| Source | Rating |
|---|---|
| AllMusic | 4/5 stars |

Scott Yanow of AllMusic states, "The enjoyable music swings hard, making one wish that this fine session were reissued".

== Track listing ==
1. "Undecided" (Sid Robin, Charlie Shavers) – 4:09
2. "Moten Swing" (Buster Moten, Bennie Moten) – 6:59
3. "Candy" (Alex Kramer, Mack David, Joan Whitney) – 5:13
4. "Ben's Broken Saxophone" (Ben Richardson) – 3:57
5. "Air Mail Special" (Benny Goodman, James Mundy, Charlie Christian) – 4:13
6. "Body and Soul" (Johnny Green, Edward Heyman, Robert Sour, Frank Eyton) – 4:35
7. "Tuxedo Junction" (Erskine Hawkins, Bill Johnson, Julian Dash) – 4:53
8. "One for Johnny" (Nat Pierce) – 6:33

== Personnel ==
- Buddy Tate – tenor saxophone
- Dud Bascomb – trumpet
- Eli Robinson – trombone
- Ben Richardson – clarinet, alto saxophone, baritone saxophone
- Nat Pierce – piano
- Eddie Jones – bass
- George Reed – drums
