= Goodbye Jimmy, Goodbye =

Single by Kathy Linden
- B-side: "Heartaches at Sweet Sixteen"
- Released: March 1959
- Genre: Pop
- Length: 2:33
- Label: Felsted 8571
- Songwriter(s): Jack Vaughn
- Producer(s): A Worchester Production

Kathy Linden singles chronology
"Somebody Loves Me" (1959)	"Goodbye Jimmy, Goodbye" (1959)	"So Close to My Heart" (1959)

"Goodbye Jimmy, Goodbye" is a song written by Jack Vaughn and performed by Kathy Linden. It reached #11 on the Billboard pop chart in April 1959.

The song was A Worchester Production and featured the Joe Leahy Orchestra.

The single ranked #85 on Billboard's Year-End Hot 100 singles of 1959.

== Other versions ==
- Ruby Murray released a version of the song in the United Kingdom as a single that reached #10 in June 1959 and reached #2 in Norway.
- Ruby Wright released a version of the song as a single in May 1959.
- The Kaye Sisters released a version of the song in the United Kingdom as a single in April 1959.
- Lily Berglund released a Swedish version of the song in Sweden as a single in 1959.
- Maureen Evans released a version of the song as the B-side to her 1959 single "May You Always".
- Alice Babs released a Swedish version of the song as part of an EP in 1959.
- Bente Lind released a version in Norway 1964 (Manu MA 80), later released in Sweden 1972 (Decca F 44571)
- Claudine Longet released a version of the song as the B-side to her 1974 single "Who Broke Your Heart (And Made You Write That Song)".
- Schytts released a version of the song on their 1975 album, Hålligång 5.
