= Bones for the King =

Studio album by Dicky Wells
- Released: 1958
- Recorded: February 3–4, 1958
- Studio: NYC
- Genre: Jazz
- Label: Felsted; FAJ.7006
- Producer: Stanley Dance

Dicky Wells chronology
Bones for the King (1958)	Chatter Jazz (1959)

Bones for the King is an album by trombonist Dicky Wells which was recorded in 1958 and released on the Felsted label.

== Reception ==
Professional ratings
Review scores
Source	Rating
AllMusic	3/5 stars

Scott Yanow of AllMusic states: "There is some good swing-based music to be heard throughout this album but nothing essential occurs".

== Track listing ==
All compositions by Dicky Wells except where noted.

1. "Bones for the King" – 6:36
2. "Sweet Daddy Spo-de-o" – 7:26
3. "You Took My Heart" (Skip Hall) – 6:01
4. "Hello Smack!" (Buddy Tate) – 6:20
5. "Come and Get It" – 8:04
6. "Stan's Dance" (Buck Clayton) – 6:35

== Personnel ==
- Dicky Wells – trombone
- Buck Clayton – trumpet (tracks 4–6)
- Vic Dickenson, George Matthews, Benny Morton – trombone (tracks 1–3)
- Rudy Rutherford – clarinet, baritone saxophone (tracks 4–6)
- Buddy Tate – tenor saxophone, baritone saxophone (tracks 4–6)
- Skip Hall – piano, organ
- Everett Barksdale – guitar (tracks 4–6)
- Major Holley – bass
- Jo Jones – drums
