= Canidrome =

Canidrome may mean or refer to:

- Canidrome (Shanghai) - a former grand-scale greyhound racing stadium in Shanghai, now the Shanghai Cultural Plaza.
- Canidrome (Macau) - a greyhound racing stadium in Macau.
