= All the Cats Join In =

Studio album by Buck Clayton
- Released: 1956
- Recorded: December 16, 1953, March 15, 1955 and March 5, 1956
- Genre: Jazz
- Label: Columbia; CL 882

Buck Clayton chronology
Jazz Spectacular (1956)	All the Cats Join In (1956)	Duke Ellington and the Buck Clayton All-Stars at Newport (1956)

All the Cats Join In is a song written by Ray Gilbert, Eddie Sauter and Alec Wilder, and first recorded by Benny Goodman. It later was a track on an LP with the same title by trumpeter Buck Clayton.

It is the last of five jam session albums released by Clayton (and produced by George Avakian at Columbia Studios) between 1954 and 1956 that Dennis Davis of Hi-Fi+ magazine as Clayton's "greatest recorded legacy".

== Benny Goodman ==
Curiously, Goodman recorded this song three times. The first-released version, released after the ASCAP boycott of 1944–1948, followed a version which was only put out later.

The third recording was for a segment of the 1946 Walt Disney film Make Mine Music.

== Clayton record ==
The record album was subtitled 25 Star Jazzmen in a Buck Clayton Jam Session. It was recorded between 1953 and 1956 and released by Columbia.

Professional ratings
Review scores
Source	Rating
Allmusic	3/5 stars

The Allmusic review by Scott Yanow stated "Everyone plays at least up to their usual high level and the riffing behind some of the solos really generates a lot of excitement".

== Track listing ==
1. "All The Cats Join In" (Alec Wilder, Eddie Sauter, Ray Gilbert) – 7:14
2. "Out of Nowhere" (Johnny Green, Edward Heyman) – 7:03
3. "Don't You Miss Your Baby" (Count Basie, Eddie Durham, Jimmy Rushing) – 6:30
4. "Lean Baby" (Billy May, Roy Alfred) – 8:20
5. "Blue Lou" (Edgar Sampson, Irving Mills) – 10:04
- Recorded in NYC on December 16, 1953 (track 4), March 15, 1955 (tracks 2 & 5) and March 5, 1956 (tracks 1 & 3)

== Personnel ==
- Buck Clayton – trumpet
- Billy Butterfield (tracks 1 & 3), Joe Newman (track 4) – trumpet
- Ruby Braff – cornet (tracks 1 & 3)
- Henderson Chambers (track 4), Bennie Green (tracks 2 & 5), Urbie Green (track 4), Dicky Harris (tracks 2 & 5), J. C. Higginbotham (tracks 1 & 3) – trombone
- Tyree Glenn – trombone, vibraphone (track 1)
- Lem Davis – alto saxophone (track 4)
- Julian Dash (tracks 1, 3 & 4), Coleman Hawkins (tracks 1–3 & 5), Buddy Tate (tracks 2 & 5) – tenor saxophone
- Charles Fowlkes – baritone saxophone (track 4)
- Sir Charles Thompson – piano, celeste (track 4)
- Ken Kersey (tracks 1 & 3), Al Waslohn (tracks 2 & 5) – piano
- Steve Jordan (tracks 1–3 & 5), Freddie Green (track 4) – guitar
- Milt Hinton (tracks 2 & 5), Walter Page (tracks 1, 3 & 4) – bass
- Bobby Donaldson (tracks 1 & 3), Jo Jones (tracks 2, 4 & 5) – drums
