= Eli Robinson =

American trombonist and arranger (1908–1972)

- Born: June 23, 1908; Greenville, Georgia, U.S.
- Died: December 24, 1972 (aged 64) New York City, US
- Genres: Jazz
- Occupations: Musician, arranger
- Instrument: Trombone
- Years active: 1930s–1970s

Eli Robinson (June 23, 1908 – December 24, 1972) was an American jazz trombonist and arranger.

After working in Cincinnati in bands led by Speed Webb and Zack Whyte, as well as McKinney's Cotton Pickers, and making his first recordings in 1935 with Blanche Calloway.

In 1936, he moved to New York City, where he was a member of the Teddy Hill and Willie Bryant big bands and the Mills Blue Rhythm Band. Three years later he played with Roy Eldridge and joined the big band of Lucky Millinder. Beginning in 1941, he spent several years as a member of the Count Basie Orchestra. He returned to working with Millinder, then joined Buddy Tate in 1954. Robinson never recorded as a leader.

== Discography ==
=== As sideman ===
- 1935: "Louisiana Liza" b/w "I Gotta Swing" - Blanche Calloway (Vocalion)
- 1935: "You Ain't Livin' Right" b/w "Line a Jive" – Blanche Calloway & Her Band (Vocalion)
- 1939: The Varsity Sessions, Vol. 1 – Roy Eldridge/Buster Bailey (Storyville)
- 1944: "Empty Hearted" b/w "Tush" – Earl Warren & His Orchestra (Savoy)
- 1944: "Circus in Rhythm" b/w "Tush" – Earl Warren & His Orchestra (Savoy)
- 1945: "Harlem Nocturne" b/w "Midnight in the Barrelhouse" – Johnny Otis Big Band (Savoy)
- 1958: Swinging Like Tate – Buddy Tate (Felsted, 2004)
- 1959: Tate's Date – Buddy Tate (Prestige Swingville, 2003)
- 1970: Unbroken – Buddy Tate Celebrity Club Orchestra (MPS)
- 1993: The Master's Touch - Lester Young (recorded 1944)
