= One for Buck =

Studio album by Buck Clayton
- Released: 1961
- Recorded: April 10, 1961
- Studio: NYC
- Genre: Jazz
- Label: Columbia; 33SX 1390
- Producer: Stanley Dance

Buck Clayton chronology
Buck & Buddy (1960)	One for Buck (1961)	Buck & Buddy Blow the Blues (1961)

One for Buck is an album by trumpeter Buck Clayton which was recorded in 1961 and released on the British Columbia label.

Professional ratings
Review scores
Source	Rating
Allmusic	3/5 stars

== Track listing ==
All compositions by Buck Clayton except where noted.

1. "Night Ferry" – 6:09
2. "I Can't Give You Anything But Love" (Jimmy McHugh, Dorothy Fields) – 7:42
3. "One For Buck" (Humphrey Lyttleton) – 5:44
4. "Mr. Melody Maker" – 6:50
5. "Blue Mist" (Lyttleton) – 7:35
6. "Prince Eagle Head" (Kenny Graham) – 5:50

== Personnel ==
- Buck Clayton – trumpet
- Dicky Wells – trombone
- Earle Warren – alto saxophone, clarinet
- Buddy Tate – tenor saxophone
- Sir Charles Thompson – piano
- Gene Ramey – bass
- Oliver Jackson – drums
