= Rudy Rutherford =

American jazz musician

- Birth name: Elman H. Rutherford
- Born: June 18, 1924; Huachuca City, Arizona, U.S.
- Died: March 31, 1995 (aged 70); New York City, New York, U.S.
- Genres: Jazz
- Instrument(s): Baritone saxophone, alto saxophone, clarinet

Elman H. "Rudy" Rutherford (June 18, 1924 – March 31, 1995) was an American jazz saxophonist and clarinetist.

== Career ==
Rutherford played early in the 1940s with Lionel Hampton and Count Basie; he initially took Jack Washington's place in Basie's orchestra as a baritone saxophonist, and once Washington returned from military service, Rutherford switched to alto saxophone. In 1947 Rutherford moved to Teddy Buckner's band, though he continued working with Basie into the early 1950s. He worked with Wilbur De Paris late in the 1950s and appeared with Chuck Berry at the Newport Jazz Festival in 1958. In the 1960s he worked with Buddy Tate and spent several years with Earl Hines in the mid-1970s. He worked with Illinois Jacquet in the 1980s and was active in performance until his death.

== Discography ==
- Billy Eckstine, 1944–1945 (Classics, 1996)
- Count Basie, Count Basie Classics by the Great Count Basie Band (Columbia, 1955)
- Count Basie, The Count (RCA Camden, 1958)
- Corky Corcoran, The Lamplighter All Star Broadcasts (Hep, 2009)
- Earl Hines, Live at Buffalo (Improv, 1976)
- Earl Hines & Marva Josie, Jazz Is His Old Lady... and My Old Man (Catalyst, 1977)
- Lurlean Hunter, Blue & Sentimental (Atlantic, 1960)
- Illinois Jacquet, Jacquet's Got It (Atlantic, 1988)
- Preston Love, Preston Love (Mexie L, 2003)
- Dinah Washington, Dinah Washington Sings the Best in Blues (Mercury, 1957)
- Dicky Wells, Bones for the King (Felsted, 1958)
- Lester Young, Blue Lester (Savoy, 1956)
