= Lem Davis =

American jazz saxophonist

Lemuel A. Davis (22 June 1914 – 16 January 1970), was an American jazz musician, an alto saxophonist associated with swing music. Born in Tampa, Florida, United States, his career began in the 1940s with pianist Nat Jaffe. Davis played with the Coleman Hawkins septet in 1943 and with Eddie Heywood's group. Throughout the 1940s, he played in a variety of jazz groups. In 1953, he appeared on Buck Clayton's "The Hucklebuck" recording. He continued to play in New York City throughout the 1950s, and recorded little thereafter.

== Recordings ==
With Bennie Green

- Hornful of Soul (Bethlehem, 1961)

With Billie Holiday

- The Complete Commodore & Decca Masters (Hip-O, 2009)

With Buck Clayton

- The Huckle-Buck and Robbins' Nest (Columbia, 1954)
- How Hi the Fi (Columbia, 1954)
- Jumpin' at the Woodside (Columbia, 1955)
- Buck Clayton Jams Benny Goodman (Columbia, 1955)
- All the Cats Join In (Columbia 1956)

With King Pleasure

- "Moody Mood For Love" / "Exclamation Blues" (Prestige, 1952)
