= Jumpin' at the Woodside (album) =

Studio album by Buck Clayton
- Released: 1955
- Recorded: March 31, 1954, August 13, 1954 and March 15, 1955
- Studio: NYC
- Genre: Jazz
- Label: Columbia; CL 701

Buck Clayton chronology
Buck Clayton Jams Benny Goodman (1953–54)	Jumpin' at the Woodside (1955)	Jazz Spectacular (1956)

Jumpin' at the Woodside, subtitled A Buck Clayton Jam Session, is an album by trumpeter Buck Clayton which was recorded between 1953 and 1956 and released on the Columbia label. It is among the five jam session albums released by Clayton (and produced by George Avakian at Columbia Studios) between 1954 and 1956 that Dennis Davis of Hi-Fi+ magazine as Clayton's "greatest recorded legacy".

== Reception ==
Professional ratings
Review scores
Source	Rating
AllMusic	3/5 stars

The AllMusic review by Scott Yanow stated "The music is taken from three different sessions, with this version of "Jumpin' at the Woodside" splicing together the best of two completely different performances. The lineup of top players gives one a good idea as to the high quality of the music".

== Track listing ==
1. "Rock-a-Bye Basie" (Count Basie, Lester Young, Shad Collins) – 8:10
2. "Jumpin' at the Woodside" (Basie) – 10:40
3. "Blue and Sentimental" (Basie, Jerry Livingston, Mack David) – 6:30
4. "Broadway" (Billy Byrd, Teddy McRae, Henri Woode) – 9:25
- Recorded in NYC on March 31, 1954 (track 2), August 13, 1954 (tracks 2 & 3) and March 15, 1955 (tracks 1 & 4)

== Personnel ==
- Buck Clayton – trumpet
- Joe Newman (tracks 2 & 3), Joe Thomas (track 2) – trumpet
- Ruby Braff – cornet (tracks 1 & 4)
- Bennie Green (tracks 1 & 4), Urbie Green (tracks 2 & 3), Dicky Harris (tracks 1 & 4), Trummy Young (track 2) – trombone
- Woody Herman – clarinet (track 2)
- Lem Davis – alto saxophone (tracks 2 & 3)
- Al Cohn (track 2), Julian Dash (track 2), Coleman Hawkins (tracks 1–4), Buddy Tate (tracks 1 & 4) – tenor saxophone
- Charles Fowlkes – baritone saxophone (tracks 2 & 3)
- Jimmy Jones (track 2), Billy Kyle (tracks 2 & 3) – piano, celeste
- Al Waslohn – piano (tracks 1 & 4)
- Steve Jordan (tracks 1, 2 & 4), Freddie Green (tracks 2 & 3) – guitar
- Milt Hinton (tracks 1–4), Walter Page (track 2) – bass
- Jo Jones – drums
- Jack Ackerman – tap dancing (track 1)
