= Groovin' with Buddy Tate =

Studio album by Buddy Tate
- Released: 1961
- Recorded: February 17, 1961
- Studio: Van Gelder Studio, Englewood Cliffs, New Jersey
- Genre: Jazz
- Label: Swingville; SVLP 2029
- Producer: Esmond Edwards

Buddy Tate chronology
| Buck & Buddy (1960) | Groovin' with Buddy Tate (1961) | Buck & Buddy Blow the Blues (1961) |

Groovin' with Buddy Tate is an album by saxophonist Buddy Tate which was recorded in 1961 and released on the Swingville label.

== Reception ==
Professional ratings
Review scores
| Source | Rating |
|---|---|
| AllMusic | 4/5 stars |
| The Penguin Guide to Jazz Recordings | 3/4 stars |

Scott Yanow of AllMusic states, "With a robust yet nuanced style, similar to his peers such as Ben Webster and Lester Young, Tate sounds as comfortable on laid-back vehicles such as "I'm Just a Lucky So and So" and "East of the Sun"".

== Track listing ==
1. "Blues for Trixie" (Buck Clayton) – 7:15
2. "The Salt Mines" (Clark Terry) – 4:23
3. "I'm Just a Lucky So-and-So" (Duke Ellington, Mack David) – 6:46
4. "East of the Sun" (Brooks Bowman) – 7:08
5. "Makin' Whoopee" (Walter Donaldson, Gus Kahn) – 5:24
6. "Board Walk" (Terry) – 4:04
7. "Overdrive" (Buddy Tate) – 4:02

== Personnel ==
- Buddy Tate – tenor saxophone, clarinet
- Ronnell Bright – piano
- Wally Richardson – guitar
- George Tucker – bass
- Roy Brooks – drums
