= Buddy Tate and His Buddies =

Studio album by Buddy Tate
- Released: 1973
- Recorded: June 1, 1973
- Studio: WARP Studios, New York City
- Genre: Jazz
- Length: 43:02
- Label: Chiaroscuro; CR 123
- Producer: Hank O'Neal

Buddy Tate chronology
Buddy Tate & Wild Bill Davis (1972)	Buddy Tate and His Buddies (1973)	The Texas Twister (1975)

Buddy Tate and His Buddies is an album by saxophonist Buddy Tate which was recorded in New York City in 1973 and released on the Chiaroscuro label.

== Reception ==
Professional ratings
Review scores
Source	Rating
AllMusic	3/5 stars
The Penguin Guide to Jazz Recordings	3/4 stars

Scott Yanow of AllMusic states, "Jam sessions featuring swing veterans were not that common an occurrence on record during the early '70s, making Hank O'Neal's Chiaroscuro label both ahead of and behind the times. ... although falling short of being a classic, this infectious and consistently swinging music is worth picking up".

== Track listing ==
1. "Rockaway" (Buck Clayton) – 8:14
2. "Medi 2" (Mary Lou Williams) – 6:11
3. "Paris Nights" (Buddy Tate) – 7:35
4. "When I'm Blue" (Tate) – 10:01
5. "Sunday" (J. Fred Coots, Clifford Grey) – 11:01

== Personnel ==
- Buddy Tate – tenor saxophone
- Roy Eldridge – trumpet
- Illinois Jacquet – tenor saxophone
- Mary Lou Williams – piano
- Steve Jordan – guitar
- Milt Hinton – double bass
- Gus Johnson – drums
