= Tate-a-Tate =

Studio album by Buddy Tate with Clark Terry
- Released: 1960
- Recorded: October 18, 1960
- Studio: Van Gelder Studio, Englewood Cliffs, New Jersey
- Genre: Jazz
- Length: 35:29
- Label: Swingville; SVLP 2014
- Producer: Esmond Edwards

Buddy Tate chronology
Tate's Date (1959)	Tate-a-Tate (1960)	Buck & Buddy (1960)

Clark Terry chronology
Top and Bottom Brass (1959)	Tate-a-Tate (1960)	Color Changes (1960)

Tate-a-Tate is an album by saxophonist Buddy Tate with trumpeter/flugelhornist Clark Terry. The album was recorded in 1960 and released on the Swingville label.

== Reception ==
Professional ratings
Review scores
Source	Rating
AllMusic	4/5 stars

Scott Yanow of AllMusic states: "The music is enjoyable and practically defines mainstream jazz of the era".

== Track listing ==
All compositions by Clark Terry except where noted

1. "Groun' Hog" – 8:10
2. "Tate-a-Tate" – 4:09
3. "Snatchin' It Back" – 5:37
4. "#20 Ladbroke Square" (Buddy Tate, Esmond Edwards) – 6:20
5. "All Too Soon" (Duke Ellington, Carl Sigman) – 4:11
6. "Take the "A" Train" (Billy Strayhorn) – 7:02

== Personnel ==
- Buddy Tate – tenor saxophone
- Clark Terry – trumpet, flugelhorn
- Tommy Flanagan – piano
- Larry Gales – bass
- Art Taylor – drums
