= The Huckle-Buck and Robbins' Nest =

Studio album by Buck Clayton
- Released: 1954
- Recorded: December 14, 1953
- Studio: Columbia Studios, NYC
- Genre: Jazz
- Length: 37:41
- Label: Columbia; CL 548
- Producer: George Avakian, John Hammond

Buck Clayton chronology
Buck's Bon Voyage (1953)	The Huckle-Buck and Robbins' Nest (1954)	How Hi the Fi (1953-54)

Professional ratings
Review scores
Source	Rating
Allmusic	3/5 stars

The Huckle-Buck and Robbins' Nest is an album by trumpeter Buck Clayton which was recorded in 1953 and released on the Columbia label.

It is first of the five jam session albums released by Clayton (and produced by George Avakian at Columbia Studios) between 1954 and 1956 that Dennis Davis of Hi-Fi+ magazine as Clayton's "greatest recorded legacy". All five albums feature 'jam session' (or, in one case, 'jam'), prominently on their cover; according to Davis, "The idea of a jam session committed to vinyl conjures up unplanned improvisation and long sides. The concept had been pioneered by Norman Granz with his Jazz at the Philharmonic series of live performances that were excerpted on 78-RPM records. It was only with the introduction of the LP that longer sessions could be presented uninterrupted on record."

== Track listing ==
1. "The Hucklebuck" (Andy Gibson, Roy Alfred) – 20:02
2. "Robbins' Nest" (Illinois Jacquet, Sir Charles Thompson) – 17:39

== Personnel ==
- Buck Clayton – trumpet
- Joe Newman – trumpet
- Henderson Chambers, Urbie Green – trombone
- Lem Davis – alto saxophone
- Julian Dash – tenor saxophone
- Charles Fowlkes – baritone saxophone
- Sir Charles Thompson – piano, celeste
- Freddie Green – guitar
- Walter Page – bass
- Jo Jones – drums
