= Hard Blowin' =

Live album by Buddy Tate
- Released: 1984
- Recorded: August 25–26, 1978
- Venue: Sandy's Jazz Revival, Beverley, MA
- Genre: Jazz
- Length: 39:12
- Label: Muse; MR 5249
- Producer: Bob Porter

Buddy Tate chronology
Live at Sandy's (1978)	Hard Blowin' (1984)	The Great Buddy Tate (1981)

Hard Blowin' , subtitled Live at Sandy's, is a live album by saxophonist Buddy Tate which was recorded at Sandy's Jazz Revival in 1978 and released on the Muse label in 1984.

== Reception ==
Professional ratings
Review scores
Source	Rating
AllMusic	4.5/5 stars

The AllMusic review by Scott Yanow stated "This is veteran tenor Buddy Tate's most rewarding album from the engagement and a fine all-around showcase. Accompanied by pianist Ray Bryant, bassist George Duvivier, and drummer Alan Dawson, Tate stretches out on four familiar standards and shows listeners that he really had one of the more distinctive tenor sounds of the swing era. Recommended".

== Track listing ==
1. "Sweet Georgia Brown" (Ben Bernie, Maceo Pinkard, Kenneth Casey) – 9:47
2. "Summertime" (George Gershwin, DuBose Heyward) – 10:30
3. "Undecided" (Charlie Shavers, Sid Robin) – 10:15
4. "Body and Soul" (Johnny Green, Edward Heyman, Frank Eyton, Robert Sour) – 8:40

== Personnel ==
- Buddy Tate – tenor saxophone
- Ray Bryant – piano
- George Duvivier – bass
- Alan Dawson – drums
