= Hornful of Soul =

Studio album by Bennie Green
- Released: 1961
- Recorded: December 1960
- Genre: Jazz
- Length: 38:30
- Label: Bethlehem

Bennie Green chronology
Bennie Green (1960)	Hornful of Soul (1961)	Glidin' Along (1961)

Hornful of Soul (also released as Catwalk) is an album by American trombonist Bennie Green recorded in 1960 and released on the Bethlehem label.

== Reception ==
Professional ratings
Review scores
Source	Rating
Allmusic	4/5 stars

The Allmusic review by Scott Yanow awarded the album 4 stars calling it "Fine music that has long been overlooked".

== Track listing ==
All compositions by Bennie Green except as indicated

1. "Summertime" (George Gershwin, Ira Gershwin, DuBose Heyward) – 4:55
2. "Groove One" – 5:01
3. "Lowland-Ism" (Babs Gonzales) – 6:24
4. "Dibblin' and Dabblin'" (Gonzales) – 2:54
5. "My Foolish Heart" (Ned Washington, Victor Young) – 4:03
6. "(Back Home Again in) Indiana" (James F. Hanley, Ballard MacDonald) – 4:34
7. "Catwalk" (Mal Waldron) – 5:37
8. "Dee Dee" (Lem Davis) – 5:24

- Recorded in New York City in December, 1960.

== Personnel ==
- Bennie Green – trombone
- Lem Davis – alto saxophone (tracks 2–4, 6 & 7)
- Jimmy Forrest – tenor saxophone (tracks 1–4, 6 & 7)
- Mal Waldron – piano (tracks 2–4, 6 & 7)
- Skip Hall – organ (tracks 1, 5 & 6)
- Wyatt Ruther – bass
- Art Taylor – drums
- Tommy Lopez – conga (tracks 1 & 6)
