= Live at Sandy's =

Live album by Buddy Tate & the Muse Allstars
- Released: 1980
- Recorded: August 25–26, 1978
- Venue: Sandy's Jazz Revival, Beverley, MA
- Genre: Jazz
- Label: Muse; MR 5198
- Producer: Bob Porter

Buddy Tate chronology
Buddy Tate Meets Dollar Brand (1977)	Live at Sandy's (1980)	Hard Blowin' (1978)

Live at Sandy's is a live album by saxophonist Buddy Tate which was recorded at Sandy's Jazz Revival in 1978 and released on the Muse label in 1980.

== Reception ==
Professional ratings
Review scores
Source	Rating
AllMusic	4/5 stars

The AllMusic review by Scott Yanow stated "Consistently swinging music and one of the better Buddy Tate recordings currently available".

== Track listing ==
1. "Jumpin' at the Woodside" (Count Basie, Eddie Durham) – 7:35
2. "Blue Creek" (Buddy Tate) – 7:22
3. "Candy" (Alex Kramer, Mack David, Joan Whitney) – 5:38
4. "Tangerine" (Victor Schertzinger, Johnny Mercer) – 10:05
5. "She's Got It" (Arnett Cobb, Buddy Tate) – 10:15

== Personnel ==
- Buddy Tate – tenor saxophone, clarinet
- Eddie "Cleanhead" Vinson – alto saxophone
- Arnett Cobb – tenor saxophone
- Ray Bryant – piano
- George Duvivier – bass
- Alan Dawson – drums
