= The Journey (Abdullah Ibrahim album) =

1978 studio album by Abdullah Ibrahim

Studio album by Abdullah Ibrahim
- Released: 1978
- Recorded: September 18, 1977
- Studio: Downtown Sound, NYC
- Genre: Jazz
- Length: 43:43
- Label: Chiaroscuro
- Producer: Hank O'Neal

Abdullah Ibrahim chronology
Buddy Tate Meets Dollar Brand (1977)	The Journey (1978)	Streams of Consciousness (1978)

The Journey is a long-form instrumental jazz album composed and led by South African pianist Abdullah Ibrahim (also known as "Dollar Brand") after his move to New York City. This studio recording was made the day after the 17 September 1977 Alice Tully Hall concert pictured on the cover and included other veterans of Ibrahim's group Universal Silence: Don Cherry, Johnny Dyani, and Carlos Ward.

== Release and reception ==
Professional ratings
Review scores
Source	Rating
AllMusic	3.5/5 stars
The Penguin Guide to Jazz Recordings	3/4 stars

Ibrahim had released Cape Town Fringe earlier in the year, and while that album's African folk roots remain, the addition of many leading-edge New York jazzmen made The Journey a much more avant-garde affair. The short "Sister Rose" begins things, a "sprightly calypso" suffused with the sound of Ibrahim's native Cape Town. Two lengthy improvisations follow—the first, "Jabulani", features an energetic rhythm section, soaring trumpet work, and atonal group playing. The 22-minute closer "Hajj (The Journey)" is a Middle Eastern–flavored work centred on a hypnotic piano riff, originally from "Eighty-First Street" on Ibrahim's 1968 album Hamba Khale! (with Gato Barbieri).

== Track listing ==
All tracks written by Abdullah Ibrahim.

1. "Sister Rosie" – 4:33
2. "Jabulani (Joy)" – 17:38
3. "Hajj (The Journey)" – 21:56

== Personnel ==
- Abdullah Ibrahim – piano, soprano saxophone
- Hamiet Bluiett – baritone saxophone, clarinet
- Don Cherry – trumpet
- Talib Rhynie – alto saxophone, oboe
- Carlos Ward – alto saxophone
- Johnny Akhir Dyani – bass
- Claude Jones – conga drums
- John Betsch – percussion
- Roy Brooks – percussion
