= Helen Oakley Dance =

Canadian-American jazz journalist, producer and historian (1913–2001)

Helen Margaret Oakley Dance, née Oakley (February 15, 1913 – May 27, 2001) was a Canadian-American jazz journalist, record producer, and music historian. She is perhaps best known for record production (including Duke Ellington) and for her biography of T-Bone Walker. She was married to critic Stanley Dance for over 50 years.

Dance was born into a wealthy Canadian family in Toronto, Ontario. Her great-grandfather, Joseph Simpson, started Joseph Simpson Knitting Mills. Dance's mother (née Mary Simpson) married John Oakley, who became the managing director of the Joseph Simpson Knitting Mills. Dance capped-off her "coming out" as a debutante by attending a Duke Ellington concert. A jazz enthusiast from an early age, she made efforts to become a singer, however had more success as a journalist and producer.

Her first act of note in jazz history was in introducing Teddy Wilson to the Benny Goodman Orchestra and persuaded them to play in Chicago. It was one of the first sit-down jazz concerts in America and was also significant because it was a public performance with an interracial ensemble. She later made other efforts to help interracial music collaboration, and was the host of significant parties and concerts for the jazz world. She also helped coordinate Benny Goodman's January 1938 Carnegie Hall concert - the first jazz concert at the venue.

== Journalist ==
Dance was one of the earliest contributors to DownBeat magazine. At the time, there were no music reviewers in the US covering jazz (whereas there were in Europe).

== Record producer ==
Dance produced jazz records for Okeh Records in the mid 1930s. She also produced much of Duke Ellington's small band work in the late 1930s. When issued, these records were usually credited to Ellington's sidemen Cootie Williams, Barney Bigard, Rex Stewart or Johnny Hodges, in order to differentiate them from the big band sound associated with the Duke Ellington Orchestra. Among these recordings are Bigard's original hit version of "Caravan", Hodges' "Jeep's Blues" and Williams' "Dooji Wooji" (all written or co-written by Ellington).

She started producing in Chicago but took a job working for Irving Mills in New York in 1937. Mills had two record labels, Master and Variety. Dance was the record producer for Variety which produced over 170 records during the label's brief existence.

== Army Corps ==
Following the death of her brother during the Second World War, she joined the Women's Army Corps and later did secret operations with the Office of Strategic Services. These primarily involved the Mediterranean region, particularly North Africa and Italy. After the war, she returned to the jazz world. She also relocated to England for a time on marrying Stanley Dance. In 1959, the couple moved to the United States.

In the 1960s, Dance became active in the Civil rights movement and was a founder of Catholic Interracial Council in Connecticut. She also wrote for a diocesan publication that concerned racial and social justice. Her civil rights work also involved human rights organizations unrelated to Catholicism.

In 1987, she wrote Stormy Monday: The T-Bone Walker Story. The book was inducted into the Blues Hall of Fame in 2001.

Dance died in Escondido, California at the age of 88. Her interment was located in Mission San Luis Rey Cemetery.

She was inducted into the Big Band and Jazz Hall of Fame in 2004.
