= Buck & Buddy Blow the Blues =

Studio album by Buck Clayton with Buddy Tate
- Released: 1961
- Recorded: September 15, 1961
- Studio: Van Gelder Studio, Englewood Cliffs, New Jersey
- Genre: Jazz
- Length: 39:46
- Label: Swingville; SVLP 2030
- Producer: Esmond Edwards

Buck Clayton chronology
One for Buck (1961)	Buck & Buddy Blow the Blues (1961)	The Great Buck Clayton (1964)

Buddy Tate chronology
Groovin' with Buddy Tate (1961)	Buck & Buddy Blow the Blues (1960)	When I'm Blue (1967)

Buck & Buddy Blow the Blues is an album by trumpeter Buck Clayton and saxophonist Buddy Tate which was recorded in 1961 and released on the Swingville label.

== Reception ==
Professional ratings
Review scores
Source	Rating
AllMusic	2.5/5 stars
The Penguin Guide to Jazz Recordings	3/4 stars

Scott Yanow of AllMusic states, "Although the musicians all play well on this mainstream set, few surprises or exciting moments occur and the performances are not as memorable as one would expect".

== Track listing ==
All compositions by Buck Clayton except where noted.

1. "Rompin' at Red Bank" (Buddy Tate) – 6:36
2. "Blue Creek" (Tate) – 6:30
3. "A Swinging Doll" – 3:54
4. "Dallas Delight" – 4:35
5. "Don't Mind If I Do" (Tate) – 8:05
6. "Blue Breeze" – 4:11
7. "Blue Ebony" – 5:55

== Personnel ==
- Buck Clayton – trumpet
- Buddy Tate – tenor saxophone, clarinet
- Sir Charles Thompson – piano
- Gene Ramey – bass
- Gus Johnson – drums
