= How Hi the Fi =

Studio album by Buck Clayton
- Released: 1954
- Recorded: December 14, 1953 and March 31, 1954
- Studio: Columbia Recording Studios, NYC
- Genre: Jazz
- Length: 55:55
- Label: Columbia
- Producer: George Avakian, John Hammond

Buck Clayton chronology
The Huckle-Buck and Robbins' Nest (1953)	How Hi the Fi (1954)	Buck Meets Ruby (1954)

How Hi the Fi, subtitled A Buck Clayton Jam Session, is an album by trumpeter Buck Clayton which was recorded in 1953 and 1954 and released by Columbia.

== Reception ==
Professional ratings
Review scores
Source	Rating
Allmusic	3/5 stars

The Allmusic review by Scott Yanow stated "The most memorable soloists are the rambunctious Trummy Young, the harmonically advanced chordings of Jimmy Jones and an exuberant Woody Herman who was rarely heard in this type of jam session setting. With Clayton having worked out some ensemble riffs for the horns beforehand and plenty of space left for spontaneity, this music has plenty of magic".

== Track listing ==
1. "How Hi the Fi" (Buck Clayton) – 13:40
2. "Blue Moon" (Richard Rodgers, Lorenz Hart) – 14:00
3. "Sentimental Journey" (Les Brown, Ben Homer, Bud Green) – 14:45
4. "Moten Swing" (Bennie Moten, Buster Moten) – 13:30
- Recorded in NYC on December 14, 1953 (tracks 3 & 4) and March 31, 1954 (tracks 1 & 2)

== Personnel ==
- Buck Clayton – trumpet
- Joe Newman (tracks 3 & 4), Joe Thomas (tracks 1 & 2) – trumpet
- Urbie Green, Benny Powell (tracks 3 & 4), Trummy Young (tracks 1 & 2) – trombone
- Woody Herman – clarinet (tracks 1 & 2)
- Lem Davis – alto saxophone
- Al Cohn (tracks 1 & 2), Julian Dash – tenor saxophone
- Charles Fowlkes – baritone saxophone (tracks 3 & 4)
- Jimmy Jones (tracks 1 & 2), Sir Charles Thompson (tracks 3 & 4) – piano
- Steve Jordan (tracks 1 & 2), Freddie Green (tracks 3 & 4) – guitar
- Walter Page – bass
- Jo Jones – drums
