= Midnight (Red Foley song) =

"Midnight'" is a 1952 single recorded by Red Foley, written by Boudleaux Bryant and Chet Atkins. "Midnight" was Red Foley's ninth number one on the Country & Western charts, spending one week at number one and a total of eleven weeks on the chart.

Hank Williams, on his final road trip the day before he died, sang an a cappella "Midnight" in the passenger seat. According to his driver, Charles Carr, it was the last song he remembers Hank singing.

== Remake versions ==
- Porter Wagoner (1956)
- Don Gibson (1959)
- Kathy Linden (1960) This version was a regional hit in many parts of the US.
- Ray Charles (1962)
- Floyd Cramer (1963)
- Wanda Jackson (1964)
- Chet Atkins (1969)
- Chet Atkins & Suzy Bogguss (1992)
