= Duke Ellington and the Buck Clayton All-Stars at Newport =

Duke Ellington and the Buck Clayton All Stars at Newport

Live album by Duke Ellington and the Buck Clayton All-Stars
- Released: 1956
- Label: Columbia

Duke Ellington chronology
Duke Ellington Presents... (1956)	Duke Ellington and the Buck Clayton All Stars at Newport (1956)	Ellington at Newport (1956)

Buck Clayton chronology
All the Cats Join In (1956)	Duke Ellington and the Buck Clayton All Stars at Newport (1956)	Harry Edison Swings Buck Clayton (1958)

Duke Ellington and the Buck Clayton All-Stars at Newport is a live album recorded at the American Jazz Festival at Newport, Rhode Island, on July 6 and 7, 1956.

The record is split between Duke Ellington (and his orchestra) and the Buck Clayton All-Stars.

== Critical reception ==
Professional ratings
Review scores
Source	Rating
Billboard	positive

Billboard reviewed the album in its issue from December 29, 1956, writing: "This is good Ellington, altho the major excitement engendered by the band is contained in CL 934. The Clayton set, which features Coleman Hawkins along with Dick Katz, J. J. Johnson, etc., should appeal immediately to the many buyers of the previously released Clayton jam sets."

== Track listing ==
12-inch LP (Columbia CL 933)

Side 1
No.	Title	Writer(s)	Artist(s)	Length
1.	"Take the "A" Train"	B. Strayhorn	Duke Ellington and his orchestra
2.	"Sophisticated Lady"	Parish—I. Mills—D. Ellington	Duke Ellington and his orchestra
3.	"I Got It Bad and That Ain't Good"	P. F. Webster—D. Ellington	Duke Ellington and his orchestra
4.	"Skin Deep"	Bellson	Duke Ellington and his orchestra

Side 2
No.	Title	Writer(s)	Artist(s)	Length
1.	"You Can Depend on Me"	Dunlap–Hines–Carpenter	A Back Clayton jam session
2.	"Newport Jump"	B. Clayton	A Back Clayton jam session
3.	"In a Mellow Mood"	D. Ellington	A Back Clayton jam session
