= Speed Webb =

American jazz drummer and territory band leader (1906–1994)

- Born: Lawrence Arthur Webb; July 18, 1906; Peru, Indiana
- Died: November 4, 1994 (aged 88)
- Genre: Jazz
- Occupations: Musician and bandleader
- Instrument: Drums
- Years active: 1923-1938

Lawrence Arthur "Speed" Webb (18 July 1906 – 4 November 1994) was an American jazz drummer and territory band leader especially active in the late 1920s and early 1930s.

== Biography ==
Webb first began playing on violin and mellophone before switching to drums. By 1923 he was performing locally around Peru, Indiana, and in 1925 co-founded the Hoosier Melody Lads, a cooperative band. In 1926 the band, led by Webb, had a recording session with Gennett Records (of Richmond, Indiana), although no discs were issued. Later that year the band moved to California, where it had residencies at various clubs and from 1928 to 1929 appeared in several films, including Sins of the Fathers (1928), Riley the Cop (1928) and His Captive Woman (1929). After 1929 Webb led a number of bands (see below), mostly as conductor but also at times as drummer and singer, up until 1938 when he retired from full-time performance.

Different lineups of Speed Webb and His Melody Lads, Speed Webb and His Hollywood Blue Devils and, between 1925 and 1938, Speed Webb and His Hoosier Melody Lads, included Art Tatum, Henderson Chambers, Teddy Buckner, Vic Dickenson, Teddy Wilson and his brother Gus Wilson, Roy Eldridge and his brother Joe Eldridge, Eli Robinson, Reunald Jones, Melvin Bowles, William Warfield, Samuel Scott, Chick Wallace, Leonard Gray, Steve Dunn, with Sy Oliver doing arrangements.

== Discography ==
There appear to be no extant recordings of Speedy Webb and his orchestras. No discs were issued from the Gennet recording session of 1926, and the soundtracks of the movies he and his band appeared in seem to have been recorded by the various studio orchestras.
