= Kathy Linden =

American singer (1938–2024)

- Born: Marion Kathleen Londres; June 22, 1938; Trenton, New Jersey, U.S.
- Genres: Pop, doo-wop
- Occupation: Singer
- Years active: 1957–2019

Marion Kathleen Londres (born June 22, 1938), known professionally as Kathy Linden, was an American pop singer from Moorestown Township, New Jersey.

== Life and career ==
Linden was born in Trenton, New Jersey on June 22, 1938, and grew up in Burlington, New Jersey. She scored two big hits on the U.S. Billboard Hot 100 late in the 1950s. The first was "Billy", a song originally written in 1911; it hit number seven in 1958. The second was "Goodbye Jimmy, Goodbye", a song written by a radio program director named Jack Vaughn; it rose to number eleven in 1959. Both singles were released on Felsted Records and featured Joe Leahy's backing orchestra. Linden was known for having a breathy, childlike voice, even as a married woman in her 20s.

Linden's talents appeared early. Her first public appearance was as a tap and ballet dancer when she was five years old. Since then, she acted in school plays and musicals, appeared in public pageants, played piano and violin in several local symphony orchestras, and with an all-girl string quintet called the Singing Strings.

She attended the University of New Hampshire Summer Youth Music School in 1954, was a soprano soloist with the All State Chorus in 1955, and studied at the Philadelphia Conservatory of Music.

As featured vocal soloist with the Singing Strings, she appeared in many well-known spots in Philadelphia and New Jersey. She also sang with several local bands.

At 19, she was discovered by record producer and trumpeter Joe Leahy when she auditioned for him. He was so intrigued with her sound that he recorded her and her first release was "It's Just My Luck to Be Fifteen." He transferred her recording contract to Felsted Records, a subsidiary of London Records which had just set up shop that year. She debuted on Felsted with "Billy".

"Goodbye Jimmy, Goodbye" became an international hit, especially in Sweden, where Linden's version peaked at no 3, where it stayed for many weeks in September and October 1959. In 1959, she was married to David Simonton, and had a son.

After more recordings for Felsted and subsequently Monument and Capitol, some of which became regional hits, Linden retired from show business in 1963 to devote more time to her family and other personal interests. She resided in Fallbrook, California in 2006.

In 2015, Linden gave her first and only radio interview since her retirement. She told former Casey Kasem interviewer Ronnie Allen that her life had changed enormously around 1980 when she became a Christian and started writing inspirational songs and singing and leading worship at many churches. In 1985, she was interviewed and sang on the Joy Program on television. In 1992, she made a pilgrimage to Israel and led worship on the boat on the Sea of Galilee. She also led worship in both maximum and minimum security prisons of Southern California for three years.

In 2019, Linden recorded a new album of original inspirational, country and instrumental songs called The Love That's In My Heart, her first release in more than 55 years.

== Discography ==
=== Albums ===
Year	Album	Record label
1958	That Certain Boy	Felsted Records FL 7501 US
1958	Kathy in Love Volume 1	Felsted Records GEP 1002 UK
2019	The Love That's in My Heart	Kathy Linden Records

=== Singles ===
Year	Title	Peak chart positions	Record Label	B-side	Album
Year	Title	US	Record Label	B-side	Album
1957	"It's Just My Luck to Be Fifteen"	—	National Records	"The Touch of Love"	
1958	"Billy"	7	Felsted Records	"If I Could Hold You in My Arms"	That Certain Boy
1958	"You'd Be Surprised"	50	Felsted Records	"Why Oh Why"	That Certain Boy
1958	"Oh Johnny, Oh!"	—	Felsted Records	"Georgie"	That Certain Boy
1959	"Kissin' Conversation"	—	Felsted Records	"Just a Sandy Haired Boy Called Sandy"	
1959	"Somebody Loves You"	—	Felsted Records	"You Walked Into My Life"	
1959	"Goodbye Jimmy, Goodbye"	11	Felsted Records	"Heartaches at Sweet Sixteen"	
1959	"You Don't Know Girls"	92	Felsted Records	"So Close to My Heart"	
1959	"Mary Lou Wilson and Johnny Brown"	—	Felsted Records	"Think Love"	
1960	"Allentown Jail"	—	Monument Records	"That's What Love Is"	
1960	"Midnight"	—	Monument Records	"The Willow Weeps"	
1960	"Take Me Home (To My Lover)"	—	Monument Records	"We Had Words"	
1961	"Take Me Home, Jimmy"	—	Monument Records	"So in Love (With You)"	
1961	"Put This Ring on My Finger"	—	RPC Records	"Billy Is My Boyfriend"	
1962	"Remember Me (To Jimmy)"	—	Capitol Records	"Beautiful Brown Eyes"	
1962	"There'll Always Be Sadness"	—	Capitol Records	"Words"	
1962	"If You Really Love Me (Take Me Home)"	—	Capitol Records	"Jimmy"	
