= The Kaye Sisters =

UK musical group

The Kaye Sisters were a trio of British pop singers who scored several hits on the UK Singles Chart in the late 1950s and early 1960s.

== Career ==
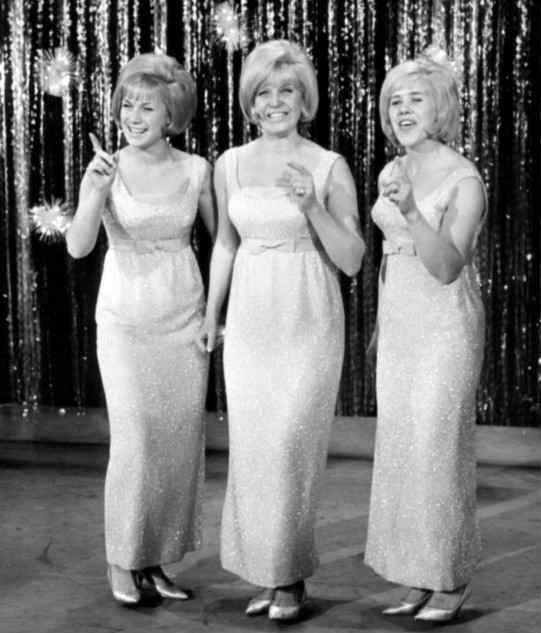
Performing on The Ed Sullivan Show, 1964

The Kaye Sisters were formed in 1954. They got their name and their start in the music industry from their manager, Carmen Kaye. They were also often billed as The Three Kayes or just The Kayes. The three members dressed in matching dress outfits and wore the same blonde haircuts, and became a popular vocal group on par with the Beverley Sisters. Two of their biggest hits were recorded with Frankie Vaughan.

A television appearance in 1956 rocketed them to stardom, and their first recording, "Ivory Tower", peaked at number 20 in the UK Singles Chart. Other singles followed, including "Got-Ta Have Something in the Bank, Frank" (1957), "Are You Ready, Freddy?" (1958) and "Goodbye Jimmy Goodbye" (1959).

The trio were headliners in top London cabaret clubs such as Churchill's and the Colony Club, and in variety supported such leading stars as Frankie Howerd, Tommy Cooper and Ken Dodd. They were popular in Blackpool summer seasons throughout the 1960s and 1970s, where they co-starred with Josef Locke, Dick Emery and, in two seasons, with Larry Grayson. In 1992, they returned to the resort to top the bill of the South Pier's Golden Showstoppers.

They appeared with Judy Garland in the 1957 Royal Variety Show, and in the United States appeared as guests on The Ed Sullivan Show. The Kaye Sisters were in demand in later years on nostalgia shows. In the 1970s they often appeared on Max Bygraves' variety bills, notably co-starring with him in SingalongaMax at the Victoria Palace Theatre in 1972.

They recorded several albums, including Presenting the Kaye Sisters (1958) and Kaye Sisters Favourites (1960). Sheila Jones left the act in the late 1960s, but they carried on with a replacement, Gilly. The original act reformed in 1990 for a Glenn Miller tribute tour.

== Members ==
- Carol Lindsey Young (12 April 1930, Oldham, Lancashire – 20 August 2006, Brighton, East Sussex)
- Shirley 'Shan' Palmer (15 August 1938, Hull, East Riding of Yorkshire – 14 July 2013, Hove, East Sussex)
- Sheila Jones (born 21 October 1936, Lewisham, London)

== Discography ==
=== Albums ===
- Presenting the Kaye Sisters (Philips, 1958)
- The Kayes at The Colony (Philips, 1959)
- Kaye Sisters Favorites (Philips, 1960)
- Gilly, Carol and Shan (Pye, 1973)

=== Singles ===
All released on Philips

- 1956 "Ivory Tower" (UK Singles Chart No. 20)
- 1957 "Got-Ta Have Something In The Bank, Frank" (with Frankie Vaughan) (UK No. 8)
- 1958 "Shake Me I Rattle" / "Alone" (UK No. 27)
- 1958 "Handed Down" / "Love Me Forever"
- 1958 "Are You Ready, Freddy?" / "The Pansy"
- 1958 "Stroll Me" / "Torero"
- 1958 "Calla, Calla, (The Bride, The Bride)" / "Oho-Aha"
- 1959 "Jerri-Lee (I Love Him So)" / "Deeply Devoted"
- 1959 "Come Softly to Me" / "Say Something Sweet To Your Sweetheart" (with Frankie Vaughan) (UK No. 9)
- 1959 "Goodbye Jimmy Goodbye" / "Dancing With My Shadow"
- 1959 "Too Young To Marry" / "True Love, True Love"
- 1960 "Paper Roses" / "If Only You'd Be Mine" (UK No. 7)
- 1960 "Come to Me" / "A Whole Lot Of Lovin'"
- 1961 "Palma De Majorca" / "I Just Wanna Be With You"
- 1961 "Little Soldier" / "Mistletoe Kisses"
- 1962 "If Only Tomorrow" / "Mistakes"
- 1962 "We Won't Say Goodbye" / "Seven Roses"
- 1963 "Big Wide World" / "I'm Forever Blowing Bubbles"
- 1963 "Nine Girls Out Of Ten Girls" / "I Forgot More Than You'll Never Know"
- 1964 "Keep On Loving Me" / "That Little Touch of Magic"
- 1966 "Life Goes On" / "I Should Never Know"
