= Buck Meets Ruby =

Studio album by Buck Clayton and Ruby Braff
- Released: 1954
- Recorded: July 1, 1954
- Studio: Brooklyn Masonic Temple, Brooklyn, NY
- Genre: Jazz
- Label: Vanguard; VRS 8008
- Producer: John Hammond

Buck Clayton chronology
How Hi the Fi (1954)	Buck Meets Ruby (1954)	Buck Clayton Jams Benny Goodman (1954)

Ruby Braff chronology
Buck Meets Ruby (1954)	Ball at Bethlehem with Braff (1962)

Buck Meets Ruby is an album by trumpeters Buck Clayton and Ruby Braff which was recorded in 1954 and released on the Vanguard label originally as a four track 10-inch LP.

== Reception ==
Professional ratings
Review scores
Source	Rating
Allmusic	3/5 stars

The Allmusic review by Scott Yanow stated "A pair of spry, individualistic trumpet masters meet to a good end".

== Track listing ==
1. "Just a Groove" (Buck Clayton, Ruby Braff) – 7:44
2. "Kandee" (Clayton) – 7:53
3. "I Can't Get Started" (Vernon Duke, Ira Gershwin) – 11:00
4. "Love Is Just Around the Corner" (Lewis Gensler, Leo Robin) – 3:54

== Personnel ==
- Buck Clayton, Ruby Braff – trumpet
- Benny Morton – trombone
- Buddy Tate – tenor saxophone
- Jimmy Jones – piano
- Steve Jordan – guitar
- Aaron Bell – bass
- Bobby Donaldson – drums
