= Charles Thompson (jazz) =

American jazz pianist and composer (1918–2016)

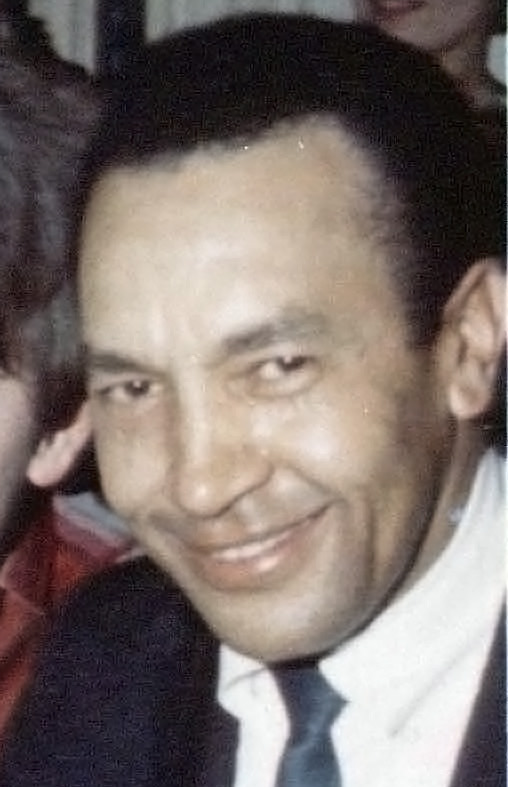
- Thompson in 1963

Background information
- Also known as: "Sir" Charles Thompson
- Born: Charles Phillip Thompson; March 21, 1918; Springfield, Ohio, U.S.
- Died: June 16, 2016 (aged 98) Tokyo, Japan
- Genres: Jazz
- Occupations: Musician, composer, arranger
- Instruments: Piano, organ

Charles Phillip Thompson (March 21, 1918 – June 16, 2016), known as Sir Charles Thompson, was an American swing and bebop pianist, organist, composer, and arranger.

== Early life ==
Thompson was born in Springfield, Ohio, United States, on March 21, 1918. His father was a minister and his stepmother played the piano. First studying the violin, and briefly tenor saxophone, Thomson later took up piano as a teenager. He moved with his family to Parsons, Kansas, in the southeastern part of the state. Later Thompson attended a Kansas City high school.

By the age of twelve, Thompson was playing private parties with Bennie Moten and his band in Colorado Springs, Colorado. During this time, Count Basie played off and on with Moten's band. During a show, Basie called Thompson up to perform. He was dubbed "Sir Charles Thompson" by Lester Young.

== Career ==
Thompson chiefly worked with small groups, including the Coleman Hawkins/Howard McGhee sextet in 1944–1945. Throughout the 1940s he played and recorded with Charlie Parker, Dexter Gordon, Miles Davis, and J. C. Heard, among others. He played with Lucky Millinder's big band in 1946, and under Illinois Jacquet in 1947–48 and 1952.

He worked freelance, principally on organ, for much of the 1950s. He played with Parker again in 1953 and recorded with Vic Dickenson and Buck Clayton in 1953–54. Thompson worked with Earl Bostic in the late 1950s before heading his own quartet in 1959.

In the early 1960s, he toured Europe and Canada with Buck Clayton. Thompson was in Europe again in 1964, with Jazz at the Philharmonic, and in 1967 for the show Jazz from a Swinging Era. He lived variously on the West Coast, often working with Vernon Alley. Through the 1970s and 1980s, he led small groups during his stays in Toronto, Paris, and Zurich.

Thompson composed the jazz standard "Robbins' Nest".

== Personal life ==
Thompson had one daughter. He died on June 16, 2016, at the age of 98 in a hospital near Tokyo, Japan. He had lived in the country with his wife Makiko since 2002.

== Discography ==
=== As leader ===
- 1945–47: Takin' Off (Delmark 'Apollo Series', 1992). Apollo sessions with 5 alternate takes
- 1945–48: When Swing Meets Bop (Ocium, 2001). Apollo sessions with 12 previously unissued tracks
- 1953–55: His Personal Vanguard Recordings (with Joe Newman and Coleman Hawkins) (Vanguard/FNAC, 1992). 2-CD; all material originally issued on four 10" LP's: VRS-8003, VRS-8006, VRS-8009, VRS-8018
- 1953–55: For the Ears (Vanguard, 1999). single disc compilation of the previous double CD
- 1959: Sir Charles Thompson and the Swing Organ (Columbia, 1960)
- 1960: Rockin' Rhythm (Columbia, 1961)
- 1961: Organ Slow (Mode Serie/Disques Vogue, 1970)
- 1961–67: Playing My Way (Jazz Conoisseur, 1993)
- 1974: Hey There! (Black & Blue, 1999)
- 1977: Sweet and Lovely (Black & Blue, 1978)
- 1979: Just Friends (Black & Blue, 1993)
- 1984: Portrait of a Piano (Sackville)
- 1993: Robbins' Nest (Paddle Wheel)
- 1993: Stardust (Paddle Wheel, 1994)
- 1997: The Sir Charles Thompson Showcase (King Records)
- 2000: Robbins' Nest: Live at the Jazz Showcase (Delmark)
- 2001: I Got Rhythm: Live at the Jazz Showcase (Delmark)
- 2011: The Jazz Legend (Marshmallow, 2012)
- 2012: Love Is Here to Stay (with Yoshimasa Kasai) (Ahbeau, 2014)
- 2014: Blue Notion (with Yoshio Toyama & Dixie Saints) (Jazzology)

=== As sideman ===
With Harold Ashby and Paul Gonsalves

- Tenor Stuff (Columbia (UK), 1961)

With Don Byas

- Don Byas Quartet Feat. Sir Charles Thompson (Storyville, 1967 [2000])

With Buck Clayton

- The Huckle-Buck and Robbins' Nest (Columbia, 1954)
- How Hi the Fi (Columbia, 1954)
- All the Cats Join In (Columbia 1956)
- Buck & Buddy (Swingville, 1960) with Buddy Tate
- Buck & Buddy Blow the Blues (Swingville, 1961) with Buddy Tate
- One for Buck (Columbia, 1961)

With Vic Dickenson

- Vic Dickenson Septet, Vol. 1 (Vanguard VRS-8001, 1953–54) 10" LP
- Vic Dickenson Septet, Vol. 2 (Vanguard VRS-8002, 1953–54) 10" LP

With Dexter Gordon

- Landslide (Blue Note, 1961–62 [1980])

With Dodo Greene

- My Hour of Need (Blue Note, 1962)

With Bobby Hackett Quartet

- Butterfly Airs (Storyville, 2003)

With Frankie Laine

- Jazz Spectacular (Columbia, 1955) with Buck Clayton

With Joe Newman

- The Count's Men (Jazztone, 1955)
- I Feel Like a Newman (Storyville, 1956)

With Ike Quebec

- The Complete Blue Note 45 Sessions (Blue Note, 1960–62)

With Paul Quinichette

- Moods (EmArcy, 1954)

With Joe Williams

- Together (Roulette, 1961) with Harry "Sweets" Edison

== Bibliography ==
- Cook, Richard and Morton, Brian (2008). The Penguin Guide to Jazz Recordings (9th ed.), Penguin, p. 1400. ISBN 978-0-141-03401-0.
