= Buddy Tate Meets Dollar Brand =

1977 album by Buddy Tate and Dollar Brand

Studio album by Buddy Tate and Dollar Brand
- Released: 1977
- Recorded: August 25, 1977
- Studio: Downtown Sound, New York City
- Genre: Jazz
- Length: 42:00
- Label: Chiaroscuro; CR 165
- Producer: Hank O'Neal

Buddy Tate chronology
Kansas City Joys (1976)	Buddy Tate Meets Dollar Brand (1977)	Live at Sandy's (1978)

Dollar Brand chronology
Natural Rhythm (1977)	Buddy Tate Meets Dollar Brand (1977)	The Journey (1978)

Buddy Tate Meets Dollar Brand, reissued as Buddy Tate Meets Abdullah Ibrahim: The Legendary Encounter, is an album by saxophonist Buddy Tate and pianist Dollar Brand which was recorded in New York City in 1977 and released on the Chiaroscuro label.

== Reception ==
Professional ratings
Review scores
Source	Rating
AllMusic	4/5 stars
AllMusic	4.5/5 stars
The Penguin Guide to Jazz Recordings	3.5/4 stars

On AllMusic Scott Yanow states "an unusual match-up that works pretty well. Although veteran swing tenor Buddy Tate plays Abdullah Ibrahim's vamp tune "Goduka Mfundi," in most cases it is the pianist (at the time known as Dollar Brand) who goes the extra distance to make Tate comfortable". While Ken Dryden said "Initially a meeting between swing tenor saxophonist Buddy Tate and post-bop pianist Abdullah Ibrahim (still widely known as Dollar Brand in 1977 when this CD was recorded), this seems like a possible misfire. Instead, it proves to be an inspiration, as each player taught the other new music and they successfully blended their disparate jazz backgrounds into one outstanding album. ... It's a shame there wasn't an encore meeting between Ibrahim and Tate following the making of this memorable disc".

== Track listing ==
1. "Goduka Mfundi (Going Home)" (Abdullah Ibrahim) – 7:15
2. "Heyt Mazurki" (Ibrahim) – 6:52
3. "Poor Butterfly" (Raymond Hubbell, John Golden) – 8:30
4. "In a Sentimental Mood" (Duke Ellington, Manny Kurtz, Irving Mills) – 7:30
5. "Doggin' Around" (Edgar Battle, Herschel Evans) – 4:38
6. "Just You, Just Me" (Jesse Greer, Raymond Klages) – 7:25
7. "Shrimp Boats" (Paul Weston, Paul Howard) – 7:25 Additional track on CD reissue
8. "Django" (John Lewis) – 10:35 Additional track on CD reissue

== Personnel ==
- Buddy Tate – tenor saxophone (tracks 1–6)
- Dollar Brand – piano (tracks 2–8)
- Cecil McBee – double bass
- Roy Brooks – drums
