= Julian Dash =

American jazz musician (1916–1974)

St. Julian Bennett Dash (April 9, 1916 – February 25, 1974) was an American swing music jazz tenor saxophonist born in Charleston, South Carolina, United States, probably better known for his work with Erskine Hawkins and Buck Clayton.

Dash was a member of the Bama State Collegians, which later became the Erskine Hawkins Orchestra. He is recognised, with Hawkins and fellow sax player Bill Johnson, in composing the swing tune "Tuxedo Junction", which became an immense hit when recorded by other (mainly white) bands, notably that of Glenn Miller.

In the late 1940s and early 1950s, Dash recorded for the Sittin' in With label and later was on Vee-Jay Records with his sextets. His renditions of "Devil's Lament" and "Dance of the Mother Bird" on Sittin' In With and his "Zig Zag" on the Vee Jay label were hits in the black community.

Dash can be heard at his best in 1953 on two of the Buck Clayton Jam Sessions, in which extended versions of songs ("The Huckle-Buck" to 63 choruses) were recorded by Vanguard to exploit the newly developed length of LP records. All of the six sessions were later released by Columbia as thematic album LPs and by Lone Hill as CDs, also in complete versions by Mosaic. On 6 March 1972, Dash recorded prominently with fellow tenor saxist Buddy Tate as one of Jay McShann's All-Stars on seven titles of Kansas City-styled tunes.

== Discography ==
- Complete Recordings 1950–1953 (Blue Moon Records, 2004)

With Buck Clayton

- The Huckle-Buck and Robbins' Nest (Columbia, 1954)
- How Hi the Fi (Columbia, 1954)
- Jumpin' at the Woodside (Columbia, 1955)
- All the Cats Join In (Columbia 1956)
