= Tate's Date =

Studio album by Buddy Tate and His Band
- Released: 1960
- Recorded: December 18, 1959
- Studios: Van Gelder Studio, Englewood Cliffs, New Jersey
- Genre: Jazz
- Labels: Swingville; SVLP 2003
- Producer: Esmond Edwards

Buddy Tate chronology
Very Saxy (1959)	Tate's Date (1960)	Buck & Buddy (1960)

Tate's Date is an album by saxophonist Buddy Tate which was recorded in 1959 and released on the Swingville label.

Professional ratings
Review scores
Source	Rating
AllMusic	3/5 stars

== Track listing ==
1. "Me 'n You" (Eli Robinson) – 7:15
2. "Idling" (Sadik Hakim) – 4:37
3. "Blow Low" (Robinson) – 6:51
4. "Moon Dog" (Dicky Wells) – 4:55
5. "No Kiddin'" (Wells) – 8:11
6. "Miss Ruby Jones" (Robinson) – 6:10

== Personnel ==
- Buddy Tate – tenor saxophone
- Pat Jenkins – trumpet
- Eli Robinson – trombone
- Ben Richardson – alto saxophone, baritone saxophone, clarinet
- Sadik Hakim – piano
- Wendell Marshall – bass
- Osie Johnson – drums
