= Songs for Swingers =

Studio album by Buck Clayton
- Released: 1959
- Recorded: November 25, 1958
- Studio: NYC
- Genre: Jazz
- Length: 45:32
- Label: Columbia; CL 1320

Buck Clayton chronology
| Harry Edison Swings Buck Clayton (1958) | Songs for Swingers (1959) | Newport Jazz Festival All Stars (1959) |

Songs for Swingers is an album by trumpeter Buck Clayton which was recorded in 1958 and released on the Columbia label.

== Reception ==
Professional ratings
Review scores
| Source | Rating |
|---|---|
| Allmusic | 3/5 stars |

The Allmusic review by Scott Yanow stated, "Everyone is in fine form on four of Clayton's originals and four swing standards (including "Mean to Me" and "Sunday"). Even though these middle-aged musicians were thought of by some as being a bit passé, they were all actually still in their musical prime at the time and were enthusiastic about their brand of small-group swing".

== Track listing ==
All compositions by Buck Clayton except where noted.

1. "Swinging at the Copper Rail" – 3:28
2. "Outer Drive" – 4:46
3. "Swingin' Along Broadway" – 6:46
4. "Night Train" (Jimmy Forrest, Lewis Simpkins, Oscar Washington) – 6:46
5. "Mean to Me" (Fred E. Ahlert, Roy Turk) – 6:14
6. "Buckini" – 5:24
7. "Moonglow" (Will Hudson, Irving Mills, Eddie DeLange) – 6:53
8. "Sunday" (Chester Conn, Benny Krueger, Ned Miller, Jule Styne) – 5:15

== Personnel ==
- Buck Clayton, Emmett Berry – trumpet
- Dicky Wells – trombone
- Earle Warren – alto saxophone, clarinet
- Buddy Tate – tenor saxophone
- Al Williams – piano
- Gene Ramey – bass
- Herbie Lovelle – drums
