= Joe Eldridge (musician) =

American jazz musician

Joseph Eldridge (1906 – March 5, 1952) was an American jazz alto saxophonist. He was the brother of Roy Eldridge.

He was born in Pittsburgh, Pennsylvania, United States. Eldridge played professionally starting in 1927, leading a group called the Elite Serenaders for several years. He played with Speed Webb and Cecil Scott early in the 1930s, and in 1933, co-led an ensemble with his brother. After working with McKinney's Cotton Pickers and Blanche Calloway, he joined his brother's new band in late 1936, remaining with the group until 1940. Following this he played briefly with Buddy Johnson, then with Zutty Singleton from 1941 to 1943.

Eldridge led his own band at the club Jimmy Ryan's in 1943, then relocated to Los Angeles, where he worked with Singleton and his brother Roy again and also with Hot Lips Page. He spent most of the second half of the 1940s playing in Canada. In 1950 he moved back to New York City, where he worked briefly teaching music, before his death in New York in March 1952.

== Bibliography ==
- "Joe Eldridge". The New Grove Dictionary of Jazz. Second edition, ed. Barry Kernfeld, 2004.
