= Canidrome (Shanghai) =

Park and cultural precinct in Luwan District, Shanghai, China

Coordinates: 31.214°N 121.458°E

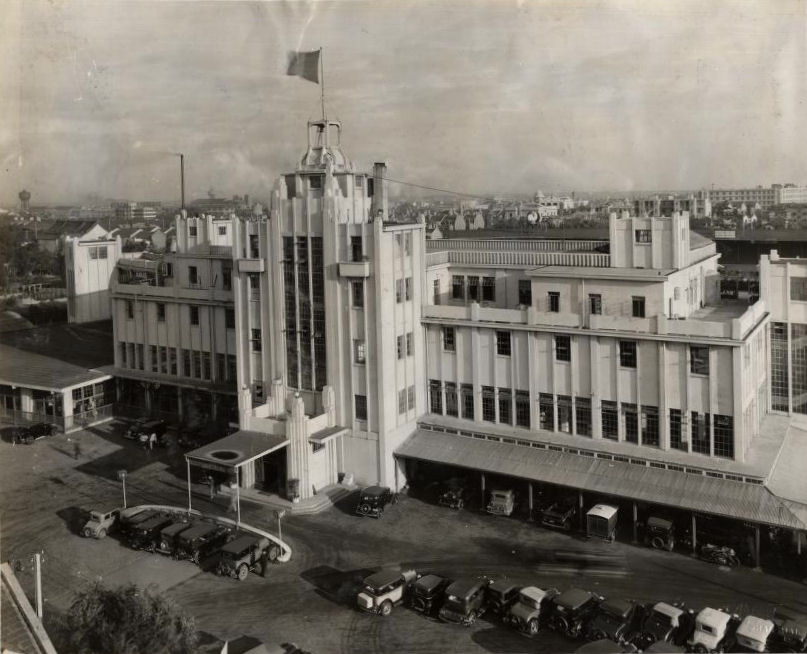
Outside of the Canidrome 1930s

The Shanghai Culture Plaza precinct (simplified Chinese: 文化广场; traditional Chinese: 文化廣場; pinyin: Wénhuà Guǎngchǎng) is a park and cultural precinct in Shanghai's Luwan District, in the former French Concession of Shanghai, China. The area began as the Canidrome (simplified Chinese: 逸园跑狗场; traditional Chinese: 逸園跑狗場; pinyin: Yíyuán Pǎogǒuchǎng), a stadium structure originally built for greyhound racing in 1928.

The clubhouse and racetrack became a multi-purpose entertainment venue, but became a place for political rallies after the founding of the People's Republic of China and a mass execution facility. Later it became a theatre and exhibition space before it was demolished in 2006. The original Canidrome grandstand was demolished as part of the reconstruction of the precinct to become a park incorporating various cultural venues.

== Location ==
The Canidrome was located on the rue Lafayette, which is today known as Central Fuxing Road. It occupies a large portion of the street block formed by what are today Jianguo Road, Shaanxi Road, Fuxing Road, and Maoming Road.

== Name ==
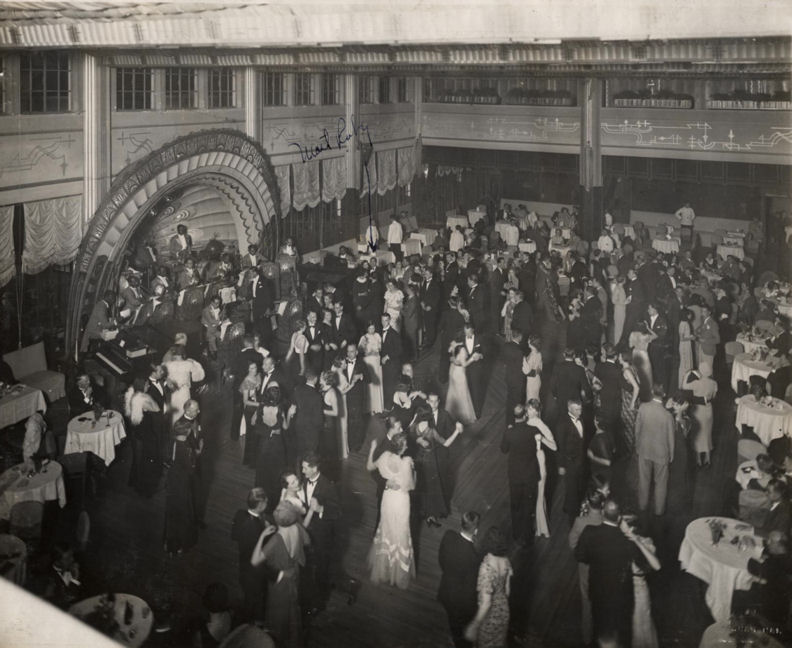
Inside of the Canidrome 1930s with Buck Clayton performing

The English name "Canidrome" is a composition of cani-, dog, and drome, race course. The Chinese name, Yiyuan Paogouchang, means "Yi Garden dog racing track", where "Yi" literally means leisure. The Canidrome has also been labeled the Rendezvous for Shanghai's Elite.

Greyhound racing ceased after the outbreak of World War II, and was not permitted to resume after the war. After 1949, greyhound racing remained banned by the Communist party which was now in power. After the new government purchased the race track in 1952 and converted it into an arts and entertainment facility, the precinct's name was changed to the Shanghai Cultural Plaza.

== History ==
=== Pre-1949 ===
The stadium was built in 1928 and could seat 50,000 spectators. The Canidrome was one of three dog racing tracks to be built in Shanghai in 1927–1928. The first was Luna Park ("Ming Garden" in Chinese), opened in May 1928. In 1932, the Municipal Council of the Shanghai International Settlement closed Luna Park down because of concerns about gambling, and thereafter it became a general amusement park. The second was the Stadium ("Shen Garden" in Chinese), owned by the Shanghai Greyhound Racing Club, which was also closed down by the Municipal Council in 1932, and thereafter became a sports stadium, and is now the Jing'an Workers Stadium. The Canidrome, being under French jurisdiction in the French Concession, was the sole survivor after 1932. It was also the largest of the three stadiums. It was largely financed by Henry E. Morris, Jr., proprietor of the North China Daily News.

In the 1920s and '30s, the Canidrome was mostly a facility limited to Westerners. The Canidrome ballroom was where the American Buck Clayton and his band performed. The Chinese discrimination mostly came about from the effects of the Treaty of the Bogue.

The Canidrome also served as a sporting venue. On March 15, 1941, a soccer game between the Shanghai Municipal Police and the Chinese team turned into a riot in the Canidrome, and cause 20,000 Chinese spectators to flood the field. As many as 30 people were injured in the game riot.

The outbreak of the Pacific War and the occupation of the French Concession by the Japanese in December 1941 led to the Canidrome ceasing operation. The grounds were used to stable horses by the Imperial Japanese Army. At the end of the war, in 1945, the nationalist government that resumed control of Shanghai did not permit greyhound racing to resume, but the Canidrome was used for sporting and entertainment purposes.

On December 1, 1945, football teams drawn from the United States Army and Navy played a game at the Canidrome, billed as the China Bowl. Players included All-American fullback Bill Daley and Purdue guard Frank Ruggieri. The Navy side was victorious.

=== 1949–1976 ===
==== Mass execution facility (1949–1951) ====
The People's Liberation Army marched into Shanghai in May 1949. Public trial meetings held in the Canidrome was referred to as "The Shanghai Enlarged Joint Meeting of People's Representatives' Conference". The Canidrome and the separate Shanghai Race Course were places where mass executions took place in the hands of the Communist Party, killing hundreds each day.

In April 1951, more than 3,000 people were arrested and herded to the stadium. Among those arrested was Green Gang leader Huang Jinrong. On May 1 for example, 500 executions were announced.

The city police, helped by communist political police, in a single night arrested an estimated 24,000 Chinese, and dragged them off to Laogai camps in Shanghai's outskirts. Among the arrested were former Kuomintang officials, school-teachers, Christian churchmen, non-communist union leaders, property owners, newspaper workers, factory managers, and students. Those to be executed were selected by a committee of 24 communist-appointed "civic leaders". The Xinhua News Agency reported that Shanghai high-school students marched beside the prisoners on their way to execution beating gongs and drums, and chanting: "Kill nice! Kill them well! Kill all of them!". At the time 10,000 people gathered and demanded the death of the accused in a unanimous roar.

==== Reconstruction (1952, 1970) ====
After banning greyhound racing and other forms of gambling, the Communist government purchased the grounds in 1952 and re-constructed the Canidrome. Additional buildings gradually turned the entire race-course into an indoor venue. The existing grandstand, including its auditorium, was retained. Part of the precinct became the Shanghai Chinese Opera School. During the Cultural Revolution, the Cultural Plaza became a venue for public meetings, where Red Guards and other agitators denounced "class enemies" and figures of authority. In the chaos of the early Cultural Revolution, a fire broke out in 1969 and destroyed many of the buildings at the Cultural Plaza, and much of it was reconstructed in 1970.

=== 1976–1980s ===
For the 20 years after the end of the Cultural Revolution, the Cultural Plaza served a number of purposes. Its auditorium was used as performance space for films and theatre. It was also used as a conference venue, often housing political conferences and meetings. Beginning from the 1980s, the Shanghai Municipal Government began discussing the redevelopment of the Cultural Plaza precinct. Decades of neglect had left the buildings in the precinct in need of repair. Construction in the precinct since 1949 had lacked overall planning. Its former role as a space for political meetings had diminished in significance, while its role as a performance space had been superseded by newer or better facilities.

=== 1990s–2000s ===
==== Redevelopment ====
The large, covered space built over the former Canidrome also served as a versatile exhibition space. In 1997, this area became the location of the Shanghai Flower Market.

In 2003, a series of international design competitions were held. A plan was adopted to rebuild the precinct as a park. Certain elements of the original structures will be retained, including the long-span space frame structure over the auditorium, which was, at the time of its construction, the longest such span in the Far East.

The original grandstand, along with most of the other structures in the precinct, was demolished in 2005. A performing arts venue known as Shanghai Culture Square was established in 2011.

== See also ==
- People's Square
- Treaty of the Bogue
