= Buck & Buddy =

Studio album by Buck Clayton and Buddy Tate
- Released: 1961
- Recorded: December 20, 1960
- Studio: Van Gelder Studio, Englewood Cliffs, New Jersey
- Genre: Jazz
- Length: 33:59
- Label: Swingville; SV 2017
- Producer: Esmond Edwards

Buck Clayton chronology
Goin' to Kansas City (1960)	Buck & Buddy (1961)	One for Buck (1961)

Buddy Tate chronology
Tate-a-Tate (1960)	Buck & Buddy (1960)	Groovin' with Buddy Tate (1961)

Buck & Buddy is an album by trumpeter Buck Clayton and saxophonist Buddy Tate which was recorded in 1960 and released on the Swingville label.

== Reception ==
Professional ratings
Review scores
Source	Rating
AllMusic	3/5 stars
The Penguin Guide to Jazz Recordings	3.5/4 stars

Scott Yanow of AllMusic states, "The melodic music consistently swings and practically defines "mainstream" jazz. Worth picking up".

== Track listing ==
All compositions by Buck Clayton except where noted

1. "High Life" – 5:25
2. "When a Woman Loves a Man" (Bernie Hanighen, Gordon Jenkins, Johnny Mercer) – 5:34
3. "Thou Swell" (Richard Rodgers, Lorenz Hart) – 5:14
4. "Can't We Be Friends?" (Paul James, Kay Swift) – 4:03
5. "Birdland Betty" – 8:01
6. "Kansas City Nights" – 5:42

== Personnel ==
- Buck Clayton – trumpet
- Buddy Tate – tenor saxophone
- Sir Charles Thompson – piano
- Gene Ramey – bass
- Mousie Alexander – drums
