= Jazz Spectacular =

Studio album by Frankie Laine
- Released: 1956
- Recorded: October 24–25, 1955
- Genre: Vocal
- Length: 48:18
- Label: Columbia

Frankie Laine chronology
Mr. Rhythm (1955)	Jazz Spectacular (1956)	Frankie Laine and the Four Lads (1956)

Jazz Spectacular is Frankie Laine's fifteenth 12" long-play album, recorded in 1955 and released early in 1956. This is a Frankie Laine theme album, the theme being jazz, recorded with jazz trumpeter Buck Clayton, pianist Sir Charles Thompson, tenor-saxophonist Budd Johnson, trombonist Urbie Green, and guest trombonists J. J. Johnson and Kai Winding.

Billboard magazine stated Laine cut the album while rushing back and forth between his act at New York's Latin Quarter.

Professional ratings
Review scores
Source	Rating
Allmusic	3/5 stars

== Track listing ==
Track	Song title	Composer(s)
1.	"S'posin'"	Paul Denniker, Andy Razaf
2.	"Stars Fell on Alabama"	Mitchell Parish, Frank Perkins
3.	"Until the Real Thing Comes Along"	Sammy Cahn, Saul Chaplin, L. E. Freeman
4.	"My Old Flame"	Sam Coslow, Arthur Johnston
5.	"You Can Depend on Me"	Charles Carpenter, Louis Dunlap, Earl Hines
6.	"That Old Feeling"	Lew Brown, Sammy Fain
7.	"Taking a Chance on Love"	Vernon Duke, Ted Fetter, John Latouche
8.	"If You Were Mine"	Matty Malneck, Johnny Mercer
9.	"Baby, Baby All the Time"	Bobby Troup
10.	"Roses of Picardy"	Frederic Weatherly, Haydn Wood
11.	"You'd Be So Nice to Come Home To"	Cole Porter
