= Felsted Records =

British record label

- Parent company: Decca Records
- Founded: 1954
- Defunct: 1964
- Status: Inactive
- Genre: Various
- Country of origin: U.S., UK

Felsted Records was the name of two record labels. The UK version began as a subsidiary of Decca Records in July 1954 with music mainly in the jazz and dance band genres and recordings leased from the French Blue Star, Riviera, and Classique labels. The label took its name from the village where Sir Edward Lewis, the head of UK Decca, lived. The British label's only release of note was "Smokie", the first single by Bill Black's Combo, Black having been Elvis Presley's bassist, licensed from Hi Records.

Late in 1957, Felsted Records US opened, operating from London Records' office in New York and was marketed as a pop label. Releases included Kathy Linden's "Billy" and "Goodbye Jimmy, Goodbye"; Jimmy Wisner's 1961 instrumental "Asia Minor", credited to "Kokomo, his Piano and Orchestra" on the London label in the UK; and The Flares' 1961 release "Foot Stompin' Part 1", which reached No. 20 on the Black Singles chart and No. 25 on the Billboard Hot 100

In 1958 Felsted was reinstated in the UK leasing US material contracted through its US office. Neither label had much commercial success; the UK label was closed in 1964 and its roster transferred to London Records.

During 1958 and '59, British producer Stanley Dance supervised albums for Felsted in New York by Buster Bailey, Coleman Hawkins, Budd Johnson, Rex Stewart, Buddy Tate, and Dicky Wells.

== Discography ==
=== 7500 Popular Series ===
Catalog	Artist	Album
FL-7501	Kathy Linden with Joe Leahy and His Orchestra	That Certain Boy
FL-7502	Joe Leahy Orchestra	It's Never Too Late for Dancing
FL-7503	Various Artists	A Night at the Boulevard
FL-7504	Robert Trabucco	Musette Catch
FL-7505	Antobal's Cuban All-Stars under the direction of Obdulio Morales	Agua!-Agua!
FL-7506	Émile Stern	All the Way
FL-7507	Billy Eckstine	Mr. B. in Paris
FL-7509	Jimmy Wisner Trio	Blues for Harvey
FL-7510	Antobal's Cuban All-Stars directed by Obdulio Morales	Dia de Reyes
FL-7511	Antobal's Cuban All-Stars directed by Obdulio Morales	Mango Mangűé
FL-7512	Howard McGhee	Music from the Connection
Fl-7513	Kokomo	Asia Minor

=== 7000 Jazz Series ===
Catalog	Artist	Album
FAJ-7001	Rex Stewart	Rendezvous with Rex
FAJ-7002	Earl Hines / Cozy Cole	Earl's Backroom and Cozy's Caravan
FAJ-7003	Buster Bailey	All About Memphis
FAJ-7004	Buddy Tate	Swinging Like Tate
FAJ-7005	Coleman Hawkins	The High and Mighty Hawk
FAJ-7006	Dicky Wells	Bones for the King
FAJ-7007	Budd Johnson	Blues a la Mode
FAJ-7008	Billy Strayhorn Septet	Cue for Saxophone
FAJ-7009	Dicky Wells	Trombone Four-in-Hand

=== 45 rpm singles, New York ===
Catalog	Artist	Album
45-8673	The Classmates (arranged and conducted by Alan Lorber)	"Theme From A Summer Place" / "Cotton Picken', Pickle Packin', Fish Strippin', Claw Hoppin' Hands"

== See also ==
- List of record labels
