= Joe Leahy =

American bandleader (1916–1974)

Joseph J. Leahy (July 25, 1916 - September 12, 1974) was an American bandleader, arranger, conductor, record producer and trumpeter. He joined Les Brown and his Band of Renown at twenty, then the Charlie Barnet band and later the Artie Shaw band, eventually forming his own orchestra for cross-country tours of ballrooms, hotel circuits, college proms and one-nighters.

== Military service ==
Joining the United States Army in 1941, he headed the forty-man Army Air Forces Orchestra of the Air Transport Command, for which he wrote all the arrangements. The orchestra gave weekly broadcasts over CBS.

His other Air Force duties included arranging and conducting for variety shows, half-hour transcriptions, cue music and orchestral works, and a two-year world tour arranging and conducting for troop shows.

== Post-war career ==
Upon leaving the service in 1945 he came to New York and signed with CBS as a staff conductor-arranger, doing script-show music, background music for radio dramas, and conducting the Skitch Henderson orchestra. Just over a year later he began doing freelance arranging and conducting, and for six years thereafter he orchestrated over one hundred radio programs including the longstanding Don McNeil's The Breakfast Club in Chicago, Illinois.

Other radio and television shows for which he did uncredited background music included those for Orson Welles, Rita Hayworth Eddie Cantor, Tony Martin, Ethel Waters, Constance Bennett and many others.

By 1954, Leahy moved into the record industry by forming his own label, Majar Records, which had an immediate hit: "If I Give My Heart to You" (Majar 27), arranged and conducted by Leahy and sung by Denise Lor. The tune inspired eighteen other cover versions.

Leahy followed up with "Unsuspecting Heart", sung by Terri Stevens; "Green Fire", the song from Desiree, and then he introduced "How Important Can It Be?" with Jack Smith.

In 1955 he joined the RKO Unique record label based at 1440 Broadway in New York, which soon had a top-ten hit with "The Man in the Raincoat" sung by Priscilla Wright in her first recording. Leahy's first album was Lovely Lady (LP-106) for RKO Unique.

Leahy charted under his own name on a few occasions. Among these performances are "Moonlight Bay" (Music Vendor Pop #53, 1958) and "Life" (Billboard Easy Listening #33, 1965).

== Reception ==
A 1959 review in The Louisville Defender highlighted multiple tracks featuring the Joe Leahy Orchestra, including "Somebody Loves You" with Kathy Linden and his own "20th of May" and "Dixie Roll".

== Legacy ==
Though Leahy's music has been nearly forgotten in the 21st century, many of his albums have been re-released on compact discs.
