= Stanley Dance =

British jazz writer and historian (1910–1999)

- Born: Stanley Frank Dance; 15 September 1910; Braintree, Essex, England
- Died: 23 February 1999 (aged 88); Vista, California, United States
- Education: Framlingham College
- Occupations: Writer, music producer
- Known for: The World of Duke Ellington
- Spouse(s): Helen Oakley Dance, 1913–2001
- Awards: 1963 Grammy Award

Stanley Frank Dance (15 September 1910 in Braintree, Essex – 23 February 1999 in Vista, California) was a British jazz writer, business manager, record producer, and historian of the Swing era. He was personally close to Duke Ellington over a long period, as well as many other musicians; because of this friendship Dance was in a position to write "official" biographies. Over his career, his priority was advocating for the music of black ensembles performing sophisticated arrangements, based on Swing-era dance music.

== Early life ==
Dance was born in England to a successful Essex tobacco merchant in 1910. As a youth, he claimed he was "fortunate" to have been sent to boarding-school at Framlingham College, where he first encountered American recordings of bands fronted by Jelly Roll Morton and Benny Moten, among others. After finishing his sixth-form year, he was encouraged by his father encouraged to continue his education at Oxford University. But Dance, who (while good at mathematics and an excellent French-speaker) was not a willing student, chose instead to enter the family business.

== Jazz interests (1930–45) ==
While working in Essex, Dance continued to pursue his interest in music, listening to radio broadcasts and attending jazz concerts in London. He soon learned of Louis Armstrong, Fats Waller and Duke Ellington through Lawrence Wright's music newspaper Melody Maker (which had begun publication in 1926). Dance chose to focus his enthusiasm on the music of black bands. He started writing opinion pieces about the jazz scene for Hugues Panassié's French-language magazine Jazz Hot in 1935, modelling his articles on those found in Melody Maker and The Gramophone that were written by John Hammond.

In 1937, Dance visited New York City's jazz scene for three weeks, going to the Savoy Ballroom or similar venues in the evenings, and listening in on recording sessions during the day. He also had an introduction from Panassié to Chicago-based Canadian writer Helen Oakley. She had been hired by Irving Mills to supervise the new Variety recordings of Cab Calloway, Red Nichols, Johnny Hodges, Chu Berry, and a number of others (many associated with the Ellington Orchestra) in whom Dance was interested.

But in September 1937 Dance joined the RAF, and (due to hearing loss) was assigned to the Royal Observer Corps in East Anglia, where his business skills must have helped organise the mostly-volunteer staff. The war extended what was to be a temporary service into nine years, a period in which his opportunity to listen to black American bands was curtailed, due to both limited leave and the effects of rationing on record-production. He certainly missed the start of Bebop, which developed during the war and a recording-musicians' strike in the US. But he found Helen Oakley when the American OSS assigned her to London late in the war.

== Postwar Britain (1946–59) ==
Dance and Oakley married in January 1947, and resided in England until moving to Connecticut in 1959. They made a lengthy trip to the US and Canada in the fall of 1946, both to re-connect with American bands as well as to meet her family. He began writing a monthly column about the jazz milieu for Jazz Journal, beginning in its first issue in 1948 until his death in 1999; while he often wrote for other publications, he only discussed his personal opinions in that column. He continued to run the family business (his main source of income), as well.

During the 1950s, he coined the term mainstream to describe those in between revivalist Dixieland and modern bebop, concentrating on black musicians. In 1958, Decca's Felsted Records commissioned Dance to produce a series of New York recordings of Coleman Hawkins, Cozy Cole/Earl Hines, Billy Strayhorn/Johnny Hodges, Buddy Tate, and several others, which were released under the collective title "Mainstream Jazz".

Oakley, however, was unhappy tied to their home. Raising four children in a 400-year-old house in a Home Counties town, unaccustomed to the English climate, she sorely missed her friends and her active working life. In their late forties, the Dances sold their English businesses and moved overseas to a house owned by her father in the Rowayton village – the 6th District of Norwalk, Connecticut – 40 miles from Manhattan. There they would try to make a living around their interests in jazz.

== Connecticut (1959–79) ==
Dance arrived in the US with a commission from EMI's English Columbia label to make proprietary jazz recordings (they had been leasing American titles). He again used his (and Helen's) contacts with the Ellington players to produce seven albums that were quite successful in Europe. He also assembled two albums for RCA. He wrote the liner notes for all these, as well as for a number of other recordings by Ellington, Hodges, members of their orchestras, and the Basie band (which he had followed since 1937). He shared a 1963 Grammy with Leonard Feather for his liner notes to The Ellington Era, Vol. 1.

In 1961, he published Jazz Era: The Forties, and in 1974 his oral history The World of Swing. He worked for a year as the jazz critic for the New York Herald Tribune, which paid poorly but taught him to "write to deadline". He also began writing articles on jazz regularly for the Saturday Review, DownBeat, and other magazines.

His connections to the Ellington organisation led to travelling with the band, writing articles from the road while helping Duke write his autobiography. This experience was fundamental to developing the material Dance later used in his books. On Memorial Day, 1974, Dance gave the funeral address for Ellington at the Cathedral Church of St. John the Divine in Harlem. He also helped Ellington's son Mercer (executor of his father's estate) deal with the large number of unissued recordings, and co-wrote Mercer's biography of his father. In 1970, Ellington wrote:

Stanley is well informed about my activities and those of my associates. He has been a part of our scene for a long time, maybe longer than he cares to remember. He and his wife Helen are the kind of people it is good to have in your corner, the kind of people you don't mind knowing your secrets. In other words they are friends – and you don't have to be careful with friends.

Dance is also credited with helping to revive the careers of several musicians, including Helen Humes and pianist Earl Hines; in 1964 he encouraged the California-based Hines to perform in New York concerts organised by a fellow-journalist. Afterwards, Hines asked Dance to be his business-manager, and Dance produced many of the 90 albums Hines recorded from 1964 to 1981. He also wrote a biography of Hines, published in 1977.

== California (1979–99) ==
During the 1970s, as the careers of many musicians Dance favoured were winding-down, he began developing books from the articles and notes he had written. With their children grown, and to escape from recurring bouts of pneumonia, Stanley and Helen decided in 1979 to seek a smaller home in Southern California. Money from the sale of their large home in pricey Fairfield County – as well as from the sale of his more than 2,000-disc collection of rare recordings to reissue producer Bob Porter – would finance a retirement from travelling, producing records, and writing articles.

In 1980, his World of Count Basie was published, followed in 1981 by what he considered his master-work: The World Of Duke Ellington, a capstone to his writing career.

He provided consultation to Jimmy Cheatham while the latter headed the jazz program at UCSD, and to Ken Burns while he was developing his documentary television series Jazz. In 1995, Dance and Helen donated their journals, photographs, and recordings to the Yale Music Library's Special Collections. He served as book editor for Jazz Times.

Dance died of pneumonia at 88 years old on 23 February 1999, at the Rancho Bernardo Remington Rehabilitation Health Care Center. His grave is located in Mission San Luis Rey Cemetery.

== Influence and legacy ==
Dance was famously characterised as an opponent of Bebop and the later jazz of Miles Davis, John Coltrane, and Free Jazz, based largely on his columns in Jazz Journal and in Jazz Times. His biographers (including Porter, Scott Yanow, and Steve Voce), view him rather as an energetic advocate of the music he loved and worked with. Dance's own perspective (from a 1995 radio interview) was:

one of the things that was really very important for jazz ... is the fact that people were dancing to it. And the musicians all liked that, most of them liked it because you know, ... it isn't quite the same thing as an audience sitting down ... of course Rock 'n Roll comes along and takes away — the kids are dancing to Rock n' Roll, partly because jazz had become so ambitious that it wasn't very danceable.

Dance's recording efforts ensured an expanded catalogue of recordings from his chosen era, and continued the careers of several notable musicians. His books and unpublished archives offer a latter-day historian documentary insight into the world of these black jazz musicians while maintaining some of the perspective of an outsider. Dance was a significant contributor to the development of critical jazz journalism and jazz history over more than 60 years.

== Partial bibliography ==
- Jazz Era the Forties (The Roots of Jazz) (Da Capo Press, 1961) ISBN 0-306-76191-2
- The World of Count Basie (Da Capo Press, 1985) ISBN 0-306-80245-7
- The World of Duke Ellington (Da Capo Press) ISBN 0-306-81015-8
- The World of Earl Hines with Earl Hines (Da Capo Paperback, March 1983) ISBN 0-306-80182-5
- The World of Swing: An Oral History of Big Band Jazz with introduction by Dan Morgenstern (Da Capo Press; Diane Publishing Company re-edition 2003) ISBN 0-7567-6672-9
