= Buck Clayton =

American jazz trumpeter (1911–1991)

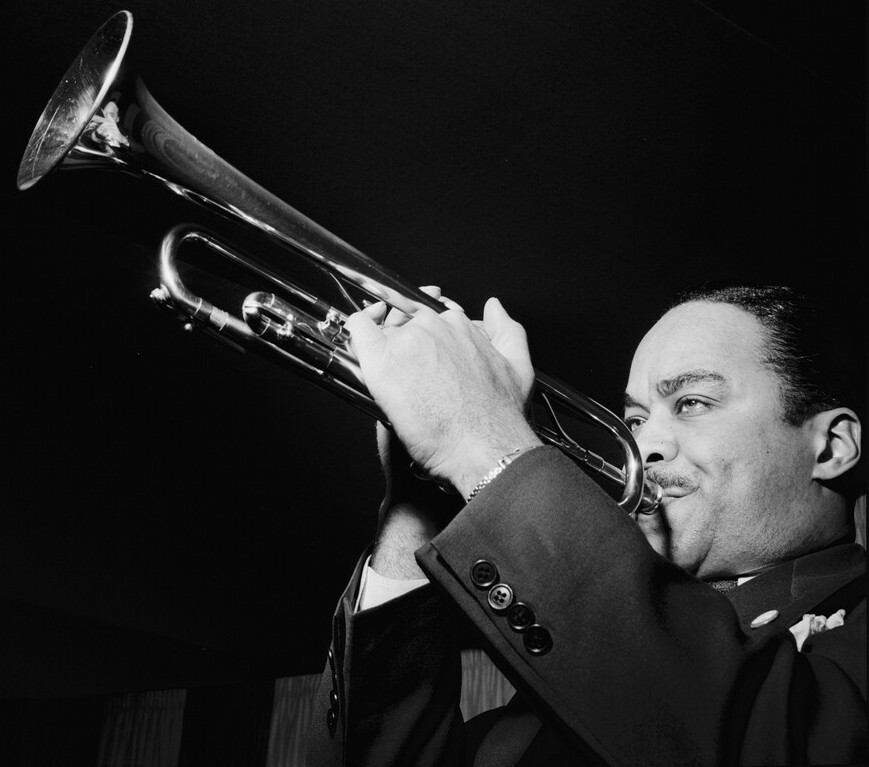
- Clayton photographed by William Gottlieb

Background information
- Born: Wilbur Dorsey Clayton; November 12, 1911; Parsons, Kansas, U.S.
- Died: December 8, 1991 (aged 80) New York City, U.S.
- Genres: Jazz, swing
- Occupation: Musician
- Instrument: Trumpet
- Labels: Columbia; Riverside

Wilbur Dorsey "Buck" Clayton (November 12, 1911 – December 8, 1991) was an American jazz trumpeter who was a member of Count Basie's orchestra. His principal influence was Louis Armstrong, first hearing the record "Confessin' that I Love You" as he passed by a shop window.

== Early years ==
Clayton learned to play the piano from the age of six. His father was an amateur musician associated with the family's local church, who was responsible for teaching his son the scales on a trumpet, which he did not take up until his teens. From the age of 17, Clayton was taught the trumpet by Bob Russell, a member of George E. Lee's band. In his early twenties he was based in California, and was briefly a member of Duke Ellington's Orchestra and worked with other leaders. Clayton was also taught at this time by trumpeter Mutt Carey, who later emerged as a prominent west-coast revivalist in the 1940s. He also met Louis Armstrong, while Armstrong was performing at Sebastian's Cotton Club, who taught him how to glissando on his trumpet. After high school, Clayton moved to Los Angeles. He later formed a band named 14 Gentlemen from Harlem, in which he was the leader of the 14-member orchestra.

From there, there are multiple sources claiming different ways in which Clayton ended up in Shanghai, China. Some claimed that he was picked by Teddy Weatherford for a job at the Canidrome ballroom in the French Concession in Shanghai. Others claimed that Clayton escaped the US temporarily to avoid racism.

From 1934 or 1935 (depending on the sources), he was a leader of the "Harlem Gentlemen" in Shanghai. Some of the bureaucratic social groups he was with included Chiang Kai-shek's wife Soong Mei-ling and her sister Ai-ling, who were regulars at the Canidrome in Shanghai. Clayton played a number of songs that were composed by Li Jinhui, while adopting the Chinese music scale into the American scale. Li learned a great deal from the American jazz influence brought over by Clayton. A 1935 guidebook in Shanghai listed Clayton and Teddy Weatherford as the main jazz attraction at the Canidrome. Clayton left Shanghai before the 1937 Second Sino-Japanese War. Clayton is credited for helping to close the gap between traditional Chinese music and shidaiqu/mandopop. Li is mostly remembered in China as a casualty of the Cultural Revolution.

== U.S. career ==
Later that year, Clayton accepted an offer from bandleader Willie Bryant in New York, but while moving east he stopped in Kansas City, Missouri and was persuaded to stay by Count Basie, whose orchestra had a residency at the Reno Club. Clayton replaced Hot Lips Page. Beginning in 1937, the Count Basie orchestra was based in New York City, giving Clayton the opportunity to work as a freelance musician in studio sessions with Billie Holiday and Lester Young. Clayton left Basie after being drafted in November 1943.

== Post-war ==
After his honorable discharge in 1946, Clayton prepared arrangements for Count Basie, Benny Goodman and Harry James and became a member of Norman Granz's Jazz at the Philharmonic (JATP) package, appearing in April in a concert with Young, Coleman Hawkins and Charlie Parker, and in October participated in JATPs first national tour of the United States. Clayton also recorded at this time for the H.R.S. label. In 1947, he was back in New York, and had a residency at the Café Society, and the following year had a reunion with Jimmy Rushing, his fellow Basie alumnus, at the Savoy Ballroom. Clayton and Rushing worked together occasionally into the 1960s.

From September 1949, Clayton was in Europe for nine months, leading his own band in France. He recorded intermittently over the next few years for the French Vogue label, under his own name, that of clarinetist Mezz Mezzrow and for one session, with pianist Earl Hines. In 1953, Clayton was again in Europe, touring with Mezzrow; in Italy, the group was joined by Frank Sinatra.

== Mainstreamer ==
The English critic Stanley Dance coined the term "mainstream" in the 1950s, to describe the style of those swing era players who fell between the revivalist and modernist camps. Clayton was precisely one of the players to whom this appellation most applied. In December 1953, he embarked on a series of jam session albums for Columbia, which had been the idea of John Hammond, though George Avakian was the principal producer. The recording sessions for these albums lasted until 1956. The tracks could last the length of an LP side, and it had been the new format that had given Hammond the idea, but sometimes this led to unfortunate anomalies. The title track on the Jumpin' at the Woodside album was compiled from two takes recorded four months apart, each with a completely different rhythm section. From this series also came Clayton's Jazz Spectacular album with Kai Winding, J. J. Johnson and vocals by Frankie Laine. Clayton also recorded for Vanguard, with Hammond producing, under his own name and on dates led by Ruby Braff, Mel Powell and Sir Charles Thompson.

In 1955, Clayton appeared in The Benny Goodman Story, also working with Goodman in New York at the Waldorf-Astoria Hotel two years later. In 1958, he was at the World Fair in Brussels for concerts with Sidney Bechet, and toured Europe the following year and annually through the 1960s. For the Swingville label (a subsidiary of Prestige Records), Clayton co-led two albums with former Basie colleague Buddy Tate and supported Pee Wee Russell on his own outing for the label.

In 1964, Clayton performed in Japan, Australia and New Zealand with Eddie Condon, with whom he had already occasionally worked for several years. In 1965, he toured the UK with trombonist Vic Dickenson, and blues singer Big Joe Turner, accompanied by British trumpeter Humphrey Lyttelton and his Band. This group featured on Jazz 625 for BBC television (later released on DVR). Clayton made numerous visits to the UK thereafter and recorded three albums with Lyttelton. In order to hoodwink the musicians' union in the UK, it was necessary to claim that these albums were recorded in Switzerland. A live audio recording made on a club date with Lyttelton, was released on Lyttelton's own Calligraph Records label (CLG CD 048).

== Last years ==
Shortly after appearing at the New Orleans Jazz Festival in 1969, Clayton underwent lip surgery and had to give up playing the trumpet in 1972. He was able to resume playing in 1977 for a State Department-sponsored tour of Africa. He had to permanently stop playing in 1979, although he still worked as an arranger. He taught at Hunter College, CUNY, from 1975 to 1980, and again in the early 1980s.

The semi-autobiography Buck Clayton’s Jazz World, co-authored by Nancy Miller Elliott, was first published in 1986. In the same year, Clayton's new Big Band debuted at the Brooklyn Museum in New York, and he toured internationally with it, contributing 100 compositions to the band book.

Buck Clayton died in his sleep in December 1991, the month after his 80th birthday, at the Manhattan home of a friend.

== Discography ==
=== As leader ===
- 1946: The Classic Swing of Buck Clayton (Riverside, 1960)
- 1945-1947: The Chronological (Classics 968, ?)
- 1946-1949 Back to Buck_New York-Paris (Ocium, ?)
- 1949-1953 The Chronological (Classics 1362, ?)
- 1953: The Chronological (Classics 1394, 2005)
- 1953: The Chronological (Classics 1449, 2006)
- 1953: The Huckle-Buck and Robbins' Nest (Columbia, 1954)
- 1953-1954: How Hi the Fi (Columbia, 1954)
- 1954: Buck Meets Ruby (Vanguard, 1954) reissued as Just a Groove (Vanguard, 1973)
- 1953-1954: Buck Clayton Jams Benny Goodman (Columbia, 1955)
- 1954-1955: Jumpin' at the Woodside (Columbia, 1955)
- 1955?: "Jazz Spectacular" featuring Frankie Laine (Columbia, 1956)
- 1953-1956: All the Cats Join In (Columbia, 1956)
- 1953-1956: Jam Sessions from the Vault (Columbia, 1988) – Anthology of the following CBS sessions
- 1953-1956: The Complete CBS Buck Clayton Jam Sessions (Mosaic, 1993)[6CD]
- 1956: Duke Ellington and the Buck Clayton All-Stars at Newport (Columbia, 1956)
- 1957: Buck 'n' The Blues (Vanguard, 1954) – reissued as Just a Groove (Vanguard, 1973)
- 1957: Very Special Buck Clayton (Philips, 1958)
- 1958 Songs for Swingers (Columbia, 1959)
- 1959: - Buck Clayton Plays (Society, 1966)
- 1959: Copenhagen Concert (SteepleChase, 1979)
- 1959: Swingin' And Dancin' (Disques Pop, 1960) reissued as Tenderly (Inner City, 1979)
- 1960: Buck & Buddy (Swingville, 1961)
- 1961: One for Buck (Columbia, 1961)
- 1961: All Stars Performance (Vogue, 1962) – reissued as Olympia Concert (Vogue, 1978-87)
- 1961: Passport to Paradise (Vogue/POP) – reissued with the same title (Inner City, 1979)
- 1961: A la Buck (Vogue/POP, 1981)
- 1961: B C All Stars_Swiss Radio Days Jazz Series: Basel 1961, Vol.7 (1997)
- 1961: Buck & Buddy Blow the Blues (Swingville, 1961)
- 1966: Buck Clayton Meets Joe Turner (Black Lion, 1992)
- 1967: Jazz from a Swinging Era [2CD] (?) B C & Earl Hines All-Stars
- 1963: Buck Clayton's Canadian Caper (Discus, 1963)
- 1974: A Buck Clayton Jam Session (Chiaroscuro, 1974)
- 1975: Jam Session (Chiaroscuro, 1976)
- 1976: Jam Session vol. 3 (Chiaroscuro, 1977)
- 1988: A Swingin' Dream (Stash, 1989)
- 1990: Swing The Village (Nagel Hayer, 2002)

=== As co-leader ===
With Harry Edison

- Harry Edison Swings Buck Clayton (Verve, 1958)

=== As sideman ===
With Count Basie

- The Original American Decca Recordings (GRP, 1992)

With Coleman Hawkins

- The High and Mighty Hawk (Felsted, 1958)

With Frankie Laine

- Jazz Spectacular (Columbia, 1956)

With Mel Powell

- Mel Powell Septet (Vanguard, 1953)

With Paul Quinichette

- Basie Reunion (Prestige, 1958)

With Red Richards

- In a Mellow Tone (West 54)

With Buddy Tate

- Swinging Like Tate (Felsted, 1958)

With Dicky Wells

- Bones for the King (Felsted, 1958)
