= Buddy Tate =

American jazz saxophonist and clarinetist (1913–2001)

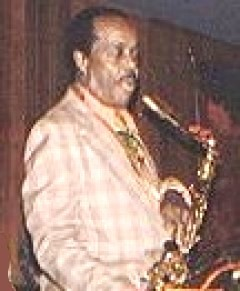

Background information
- Born: George Holmes Tate; February 22, 1913; Sherman, Texas, U.S.
- Died: February 10, 2001 (aged 87) Chandler, Arizona, U.S.
- Genres: Swing, big band
- Occupation: Musician
- Instruments: Saxophone, clarinet

George Holmes "Buddy" Tate (February 22, 1913 – February 10, 2001) was an American jazz saxophonist and clarinetist.

== Biography ==
Tate was born in Sherman, Texas, and first played the alto saxophone. According to the website All About Jazz, "Tate was performing in public as early as 1925 in a band called McCloud's Night Owls." Tate's 2001 New York Times obituary stated that "he began his career in the late 1920s, playing around the Southwest with bands led by Terrence Holder, Andy Kirk and Nat Towles."

Tate switched to tenor saxophone, making a name for himself in bands such as the one led by Andy Kirk. He joined Count Basie in 1939 and stayed with him until 1948. He had been selected by Basie after the death of Herschel Evans, which Tate stated he had predicted in a dream.

After his period with Basie ended, he worked with several other bands before he found success on his own, starting in 1953 in Harlem. His group worked at the Celebrity Club from 1953 to 1974. In the late 1970s, he co-led a band with Paul Quinichette and worked with Benny Goodman.

In 1979, Tate's hometown invited him to play a concert at Austin College's Sid Richardson Center as part of The Sherman Symphony Pops Series. Mayor Virginia Morriss issued a proclamation declaring October 6 "Buddy Tate Day". Accompanying Tate were Jay McShann, Claude Williams, Buster Smith and Paul Gunther.

In 1980, he was injured by scalding water in a hotel shower, which kept him inactive for four months. He later suffered from a serious illness. The 1990s saw him slow down, but he remained active playing with Lionel Hampton among others.

In 1992, Tate took part in the documentary, Texas Tenor: The Illinois Jacquet Story. In 1996, he recorded with reeds player James Carter on the younger man's second release for Atlantic Records, Conversin' with the Elders, along with trumpeters Harry "Sweets" Edison and Lester Bowie, and saxophonists Hamiet Bluiett and Larry Smith.

Tate lived in New York until 2001 when he moved to Phoenix, Arizona, to be cared for by his daughter. He died in Chandler, Arizona, twelve days before his 88th birthday.

== Discography ==
=== As leader ===
- Jumpin' on the West Coast (Blue Lion, 1947)
- And His Celebrity Club Orchestra (Black & Blue, 1976) – recorded in 1954, some titles issued on the Baton label
- Swinging Like Tate (Felsted, 1958)
- The Madison Beat (Harmony, 1959)
- Tate's Date (Swingville, 1960)
- Tate-a-Tate (Swingville, 1960) with Clark Terry
- Buck & Buddy (Swingville, 1960) with Buck Clayton
- Groovin' with Buddy Tate (Swingville, 1961)
- Buck & Buddy Blow the Blues (Swingville, 1961) with Buck Clayton
- And His Celebrity Club Orchestra Vol. 2 (Black & Blue, 1968)
- Unbroken (MPS, 1970)
- Broadway (Black & Blue, 1972)
- Buddy Tate and His Buddies (Chiaroscuro, 1973)
- The Texas Twister (Master Jazz Recordings, 1975)
- Jive at Five (Storyville, 1975)
- Our Bag (Riff, 1975)
- Kansas City Joys (Sonet, 1976)
- Tate A Tete At La Fontaine - Buddy Tate Quartet & Quintet Featuring Tete Montoliu At La Fontaine, September 24 1975, Copenhagen (Storyville, 1976)
- Buddy Tate Meets Dollar Brand (Chiaroscuro, 1977) with Dollar Brand
- Live at Sandy's (Muse, 1978)
- Hard Blowin' (Muse, 1978)
- The Great Buddy Tate (Concord, 1981)
- The Ballad Artistry (Sackville, 1981) with The Ed Bickert Trio
- Just Jazz (Uptown Records, 1984) with Al Grey
- Just Friends (Muse, 1990 [1992]) with Nat Simkins and Houston Person

=== As sideman ===
With Ray Bryant

- Madison Time (Columbia, 1960)
- Dancing the Big Twist (Columbia, 1961)

With James Carter

- Conversin' with the Elders (Atlantic, 1996)

With Milt Buckner

- Midnight Slows, Volume 1 (Black & Blue, 1973)
- Midnight Slows, Volume 4 (Black & Blue, 1974)
- Midnight Slows, Volume 5 (Black & Blue, 1974)

With Buck Clayton

- Buck Meets Ruby (Vanguard, 1954) with Ruby Braff
- Jumpin' at the Woodside (Columbia, 1955)
- All the Cats Join In (Columbia 1956)
- Songs for Swingers (Columbia, 1958)
- Copenhagen Concert (SteepleChase, 1959 [1979])
- One for Buck (Columbia, 1961)

With Arnett Cobb

- Live at Sandy's! (Muse, 1978)

With Wild Bill Davis

- Midnight Slows, Volume 2 (Black & Blue, 1973)

With Eddie "Lockjaw" Davis

- Very Saxy (Prestige, 1959)

With Roy Eldridge

- Rockin' Chair (Clef, 1951)

With Claude Hopkins

- Yes Indeed! (Swingville, 1960) with Emmett Berry
- Let's Jam (Swingville, 1961) with Joe Thomas

With Jay McShann

- The Last of the Blue Devils (Atlantic, 1978)

With Jimmy Rushing

- Livin' the Blues (BluesWay, 1968)

With Al Sears

- Things Ain't What They Used to Be (Swingville, 1961) as part of the Prestige Swing Festival

With Rex Stewart

- Henderson Homecoming (United Artists, 1959)

With Eddie "Cleanhead" Vinson

- Live at Sandy's (Muse, 1978 [1981])
- Hold It Right There! (Muse, 1978 [1984])

With Dicky Wells

- Bones for the King (Felsted, 1958)
