= Wanted to Do One Together =

Studio album by Ben Webster and "Sweets" Edison
- Released: September 17, 1962
- Recorded: June 6–7, 1962
- Studio: Columbia 30th Street Studio, New York City, NY
- Genre: Jazz
- Length: 39:43
- Label: Columbia; CS 8691
- Producer: Mike Berniker

Ben Webster chronology
BBB & Co. (1962)	Wanted to Do One Together (1962)	Soulmates (1963)

Harry "Sweets" Edison chronology
Jawbreakers (1962)	Wanted to Do One Together (1962)	"Sweets" for the Sweet (1964)

Wanted to Do One Together (also released as Ben and "Sweets") is an album by Ben Webster and Harry "Sweets" Edison, recorded in 1962 and released by the Columbia label. Webster had previously recorded with Edison on his albums Sweets (Clef, 1956) and Gee Baby, Ain't I Good to You (Verve, 1957).

== Critical reception ==
Professional ratings
Review scores
Source	Rating
AllMusic	4/5 stars
The Rolling Stone Jazz Record Guide	3/5 stars

AllMusic reviewer Scott Yanow stated, "Tenor saxophonist Ben Webster and trumpeter Harry 'Sweets' Edison, both veterans of the swing era (although associated with different orchestras), had long wanted to record a full album together. The results, a swinging quintet set with pianist Hank Jones, bassist George Duvivier, and drummer Clarence Johnston, are quite rewarding... Nothing unexpected occurs but the melodic music is quite enjoyable".

== Track listing ==
1. "Better Go" (Ben Webster) – 8:58
2. "How Long Has This Been Going On" (George Gershwin, Ira Gershwin) – 5:31
3. "Kitty" (Harry Edison) – 7:59
4. "My Romance" (Richard Rodgers, Lorenz Hart) – 4:14
5. "Did You Call Her Today" (Webster) – 8:54
6. "Embraceable You" (Gershwin, Gershwin) – 4:07

== Personnel ==
- "Sweets" Edison – trumpet
- Ben Webster – tenor saxophone
- Hank Jones – piano
- George Duvivier – bass
- Clarence Johnson – drums
