= Mousey Alexander =

American jazz drummer

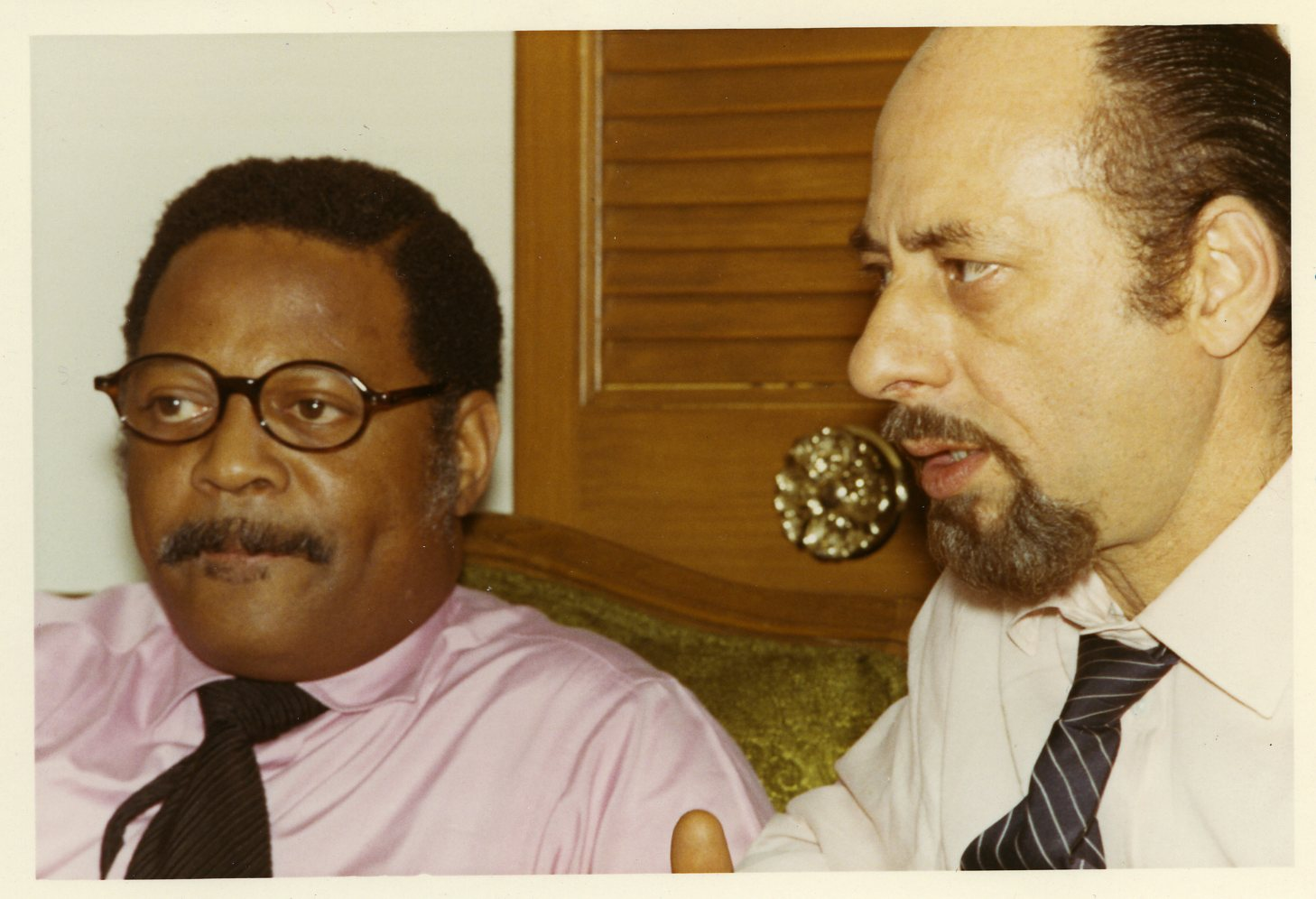
- Clark Terry (left) and Mousey Alexander (right) in December 1970

Background information
- Born: Elmer Alexander; June 29, 1922; Gary, Indiana
- Died: 9 October 1988 (aged 66) Orlando, Florida
- Genre: Jazz
- Occupation: Musician
- Instrument: Drums
- Years active: 1940s–1980s
- Label: Famous Door
- Formerly of: Sauter-Finegan Orchestra

Elmer "Mousey" Alexander (June 19, 1922 – October 9, 1988) was an American jazz drummer.

== Career ==
Alexander was born in Gary, Indiana to Assyrian parents from Iran. He grew up in Chicago, eventually studying at the Roy C. Knapp School of Percussion located there.

Prior to serving in the Navy during World War II, Alexander backed up different performers at Chicago jazz clubs, including the singer Billie Holiday. In the late 1940s, Alexander began working with Jimmy McPartland in Chicago, and, in 1952, began playing in the band of pianist Marian McPartland. In the middle of the 1950s, he played and recorded with the Sauter-Finegan Orchestra and with guitarist, Johnny Smith. In 1956, he accompanied Benny Goodman on a tour of the Far East and, subsequently, toured with him up until the early 1970s to additional locations as well, such as to South America and Europe. Later, in the 1950s, he often worked with Bud Freeman and Eddie Condon. He also played with Charlie Ventura, Red Norvo, Clark Terry, Ralph Sutton, Sy Oliver, and Doc Severinsen. Alexander freelanced during the 1960s with several bands. In the 1970s, he recorded for jazz producer Harry Lim and the Famous Door record label, and in 1972, accompanied the singer, Pearl Bailey, when she performed for President Richard Nixon at the White House.

Alexander suffered a stroke in 1980. After a period of recovery, he continued playing jazz until his death in 1988. He died of heart failure and kidney failure.

== Discography ==
=== As leader ===
- The Mouse Roars! (Famous Door, 1979)

=== As sideman ===
With Johnny Smith

- The Johnny Smith Quartet (Roost, 1955)
- The Johnny Smith Foursome Vol. II (Roost, 1957)
- Plus the Trio (Roost, 1960)
- The Johnny Smith Stan Getz Years (Roulette, 1978)

With Charlie Ventura

- The New Charlie Ventura in Hi-Fi (Baton, 1956)
- Plays Hi-Fi Jazz (Tops, 1957)
- Chazz '77 (Famous Door, 1977)
- Charlie Ventura Quintet (Hall of Fame, 1978)

With others

- Eddie Barefield, The Indestructible E. B. (Famous Door, 1977)
- Mike Bryan, Mike Bryan and His Sextet in Concert (Storyville, 1962)
- Mike Bryan, Mike Bryan Sextet (Storyville, 1981)
- John Bunch, John's Bunch (Famous Door, 1975)
- John Carisi, The New Jazz Sound of Show Boat (Columbia, 1960)
- Buck Clayton & Buddy Tate, Buck & Buddy (Prestige Swingville, 1961)
- Buck Clayton & Buddy Tate, Kansas City Nights (Prestige 1974)
- Billy Franklin, The Golden Horn of Billy Franklin (Grand Prix Series 1962)
- Urbie Green, Ross Tompkins, Carl Fontana, Oleo (Pausa, 1978)
- Beverly Kenney, Sings for Johnny Smith (Roost, 1956)
- Lee Konitz, Spirits (Milestone, 1972)
- Gene Krupa, Percussion King (Verve, 1961)
- Marky Markowitz, Mark's Vibes (Famous Door, 1976)
- Jimmy McPartland & Marian McPartland, Play TV Themes (Design, 1960)
- Red Norvo, The Second Time Around (Famous Door, 1975)
- Nat Pierce, The Ballad of Jazz Street (Zim, 1980)
- Sal Salvador, Jazz Unlimited (Jazz Unlimited, 1961)
- Sauter-Finegan Orchestra, Inside Sauter-Finegan (RCA Victor, 1954)
- Zoot Sims & Jimmy Rowles, Zoot Suite (High Note, 1973)
- Zoot Sims & Jimmy Rowles, If I'm Lucky (Pablo, 1977)
- Zoot Sims & Jimmy Rowles, Warm Tenor (Pablo, 1979)
- Derek Smith, Toasting Derek Smith (Time, 1962)
- Jeri Southern, Jeri Southern Meets Johnny Smith (Roulette, 1958)
- Lou Stein, Jazz Trio (Jump, 1971)
- Rex Stewart, Redhead (Design, 1958)
- Rex Stewart, Henderson Homecoming (United Artists, 1959)
- Ralph Sutton, Ruby Braff, On Sunnie's Side of the Street (Blue Angel Jazz Club, 1968)
- Clark Terry, In Concert Live (Etoile, 1973)
- Phil Wilson, That's All (Famous Door, 1976)
- Jimmy Witherspoon, Goin' to Kansas City Blues (RCA Victor, 1958)
