= If I'm Lucky =

If I'm Lucky may refer to:

- If I'm Lucky (film), 1946
- If I'm Lucky (album), 1977 album by Zoot Sims and Jimmy Rowles
- "If I'm Lucky" (song), 2017 song by Jason Derulo
