= Further Definitions =

Studio album

Studio album by Benny Carter
- Released: 1962, 1966
- Recorded: 1961, 1966
- Genre: Jazz
- Length: 33:38, 37:45
- Label: Impulse!
- Producer: Bob Thiele, George Cates

Benny Carter chronology
Sax ala Carter! (1960)	Further Definitions (1962)	BBB & Co. (1962)

Further Definitions is a 1962 jazz album by Benny Carter and his orchestra, rereleased on CD in 1997 coupled with his follow-up album, 1966's Additions to Further Definitions. The earlier album features an all-star octet that includes Coleman Hawkins, with whom Carter had recorded in Paris in 1937, using the same configuration of instruments: four saxophones, piano, guitar, bass, and drums.

== Reception ==
Professional ratings
Review scores
Source	Rating
AllMusic	(Further Definitions)
AllMusic	(Additions to Further Definitions)
DownBeat	(Original Lp version)
The Penguin Guide to Jazz Recordings	(Further Definitions)
The Rolling Stone Jazz Record Guide	(Further Definitions)
The Rolling Stone Jazz Record Guide	(Additions to Further Definitions)

The Penguin Guide to Jazz selected this album as part of its suggested "Core Collection", calling it "a good value purchase."

== Track listing ==
Further Definitions

1. "Honeysuckle Rose" (Andy Razaf–Fats Waller) – 3:50
2. "The Midnight Sun Will Never Set" (Jones–Cochran–Salvador) – 3:57
3. "Crazy Rhythm" (Caesar–Meyer–Kahn) – 3:23
4. "Blue Star" (Carter) – 5:19
5. "Cotton Tail" (Ellington) – 4:24
6. "Body and Soul" (Green–Sour–Heyman–Eyton) – 4:09
7. "Cherry" (Redman–Gilbert) – 4:52
8. "Doozy" (Carter) – 3:32
  Additions to Further Definitions
9. "Fantastic, That's You" (Cates–Greene–Thiele) – 6:11
10. "Come on Back" (Carter) – 4:14
11. "We Were in Love" (Carter) – 4:27
12. "If Dreams Come True" (Sampson–Goodman–Mills) – 5:49
13. "Prohibido" (Carter) – 3:20
14. "Doozy" (Carter) – 5:33
15. "Rock Bottom" (Carter) – 4:14
16. "Titmouse" (Carter) – 3:02

1–8 recorded in 1961 in New York City, on 13 November (1–3, 7) and 15 November (4–6, 8).
9–16 recorded in 1966 in Los Angeles, on 2 March (9, 10–13) and 4 March (11, 14–16).

Solo Order, by Track:

1. Rouse, Woods, Hawkins, Carter
2. Hawkins, Katz, Carter
3. Hawkins, Woods, Rouse, Carter, Katz
4. Hawkins, Carter, Katz, Carter (ad-libbing)
5. Hawkins, Carter, Rouse, Woods, Hawkins, Katz
6. Woods, Rouse, Carter, Hawkins
7. Carter (Intro), Rouse, Carter, Rouse, Woods, Hawkins
8. Katz, Woods, Hawkins, Carter, Rouse, Katz

== Personnel ==
Further Definitions

- Benny Carter – alto saxophone
- Phil Woods – alto saxophone
- Coleman Hawkins – tenor saxophone
- Charlie Rouse – tenor saxophone
- John Collins – guitar
- Dick Katz – piano
- Jimmy Garrison – bass
- Jo Jones – drums

Additions to Further Definitions

- Benny Carter – alto saxophone
- Bud Shank – alto saxophone
- Teddy Edwards – tenor saxophone
- Buddy Collette – tenor saxophone (9–10, 12–13)
- Bill Perkins – tenor saxophone (11, 14–16)
- Bill Hood – baritone saxophone
- Barney Kessel – guitar (9–10, 12–13)
- Mundell Lowe – guitar (11, 14–16)
- Don Abney – piano
- Ray Brown – bass
- Alvin Stoller – drums

Production

- Johnny Cue - engineer
- Pete Turner - photography
