= Warm Tenor =

Studio album by Zoot Sims and Jimmy Rowles
- Released: 1979
- Recorded: September 18 & 19, 1978
- Studio: RCA, New York City, NY
- Genre: Jazz
- Length: 45:25
- Label: Pablo; 2310 831
- Producer: Norman Granz

Zoot Sims chronology
For Lady Day (1978)	Warm Tenor (1979)	The Sweetest Sounds (1979)

Warm Tenor is an album by saxophonist Zoot Sims, recorded in 1978 and released by the Pablo label the following year.

== Reception ==
Professional ratings
Review scores
Source	Rating
AllMusic	4/5 stars
The Penguin Guide to Jazz Recordings	3.5/4 stars
DownBeat	5/5 stars

AllMusic reviewer Scott Yanow stated: "The Pablo label was a perfect home for Zoot Sims during the second half of the '70s; the cool-toned tenor always sounded at his best in informal settings with small groups where he had the opportunity to stretch out. This quartet set with pianist Jimmy Rowles, bassist George Mraz and drummer Mousey Alexander gives Sims a chance to interpret a variety of mostly underplayed standards". All About Jazz noted: "His Pablo period arguably garners less notice than the earlier stages of his career ... But by my reckoning it's every bit as good, if not better. This set and its predecessor, If I'm Lucky, are the picks of that stellar run, not to mention lasting paragons of tenor-plus-rhythm jazz of any era ... this session really, truly does belong in every jazz collection".

== Track listing ==
1. "Dream Dancing" (Cole Porter) – 7:22
2. "Old Devil Moon" (Burton Lane, Yip Harburg) – 5:34
3. "Blues for Louise" (Zoot Sims) – 2:39
4. "Jitterbug Waltz" (Fats Waller) – 6:51
5. "You Go to My Head" (J. Fred Coots, Haven Gillespie) – 5:15
6. "Blue Prelude" (Gordon Jenkins, Joe Bishop) – 5:43
7. "Comes Love" (Sam H. Stept, Lew Brown, Charles Tobias) – 5:52
8. "You're My Thrill" (Jay Gorney, Sidney Clare) – 6:09

== Personnel ==
- Zoot Sims – tenor saxophone
- Jimmy Rowles – piano
- George Mraz – bass
- Mousey Alexander – drums
