= Soulville =

Studio album by Ben Webster
- Released: 1957
- Recorded: October 15, 1957
- Genre: Jazz
- Length: 48:45
- Label: Verve
- Producer: Norman Granz

Ben Webster chronology
Trav'lin Light (1957)	Soulville (1957)	Coleman Hawkins Encounters Ben Webster (1957)

Professional ratings
Review scores
Source	Rating
AllMusic	5/5 stars
Encyclopedia of Popular Music	4/5 stars
MusicHound	4/5
Penguin Guide to Jazz	4/4 stars
The Rolling Stone Jazz Record Guide	5/5 stars
DownBeat	4.5/5 stars

Soulville is a 1957 album by swing tenor saxophonist Ben Webster, recording a session from October 15, 1957, which Webster played with the Oscar Peterson Trio and accompanied by Stan Levey.

The album was part of a series of studio recordings in October 1957 that matched Webster and Coleman Hawkins with Oscar Peterson. The next day, Webster and Hawkins recorded Coleman Hawkins Encounters Ben Webster with Peterson's trio and Alvin Stoller on drums, and nine days later, Hawkins recorded The Genius of Coleman Hawkins with the Peterson Trio and Stoller.

== Reception ==
This session is described by AllMusic as "one of the highlights" of Webster's "golden '50s run". The album was reissued in the early 1990s on CD with three bonus tracks, which include rare recordings of Webster playing piano. When it was remastered in 24-bit for a 2003 edition, additional photographs and new liner notes were also included.

== Track listing ==
1. "Soulville" (Ben Webster) – 8:03
2. "Late Date" (Webster) – 7:13
3. "Time on My Hands" (Harold Adamson, Mack Gordon, Vincent Youmans) – 4:16
4. "Lover, Come Back to Me" (Oscar Hammerstein II, Sigmund Romberg) – 8:26
5. "Where Are You?" (Lew Pollack, Lou Davis) – 4:41
6. "Makin' Whoopee" (Walter Donaldson, Gus Kahn) – 4:29
7. "Ill Wind (Harold Arlen, Ted Koehler) – 3:30

=== Bonus tracks ===
8. "Who?" (Hammerstein, Otto Harbach, Jerome Kern) – 2:56
9. "Boogie Woogie" (Webster) – 3:06
10. "Roses of Picardy" (Frederick E. Weatherly, Haydn Wood) – 2:05

== Personnel ==
=== Performance ===
- Ray Brown – bass
- Herb Ellis – guitar
- Stan Levey – drums
- Oscar Peterson – piano
- Ben Webster – tenor saxophone, piano on the bonus tracks

=== Production ===
- Norman Granz – producer
- Nat Hentoff – original liner notes
- Ellie Hughes – design
- Tom Hughes – design
- Seth Rothstein – CD preparation
- Tom "Curly" Ruff – digital remastering
- Phil Schaap – re-issue liner notes
- Richard Seidel – CD preparation
- Phil Stern – photography
