= Gerry Mulligan Meets Ben Webster =

Studio album by Gerry Mulligan and Ben Webster
- Released: 1960
- Recorded: November 3 and December 2, 1959
- Genre: Cool jazz/Swing
- Label: Verve
- Producer: Norman Granz

Gerry Mulligan chronology
Gerry Mulligan Meets Johnny Hodges (1960)	Gerry Mulligan Meets Ben Webster (1960)	The Concert Jazz Band (1960)

Ben Webster chronology
Ben Webster and Associates (1960)	Gerry Mulligan Meets Ben Webster (1960)	Ben Webster Meets Oscar Peterson (1960)

Professional ratings
Review scores
Source	Rating
AllMusic	5/5 stars
DownBeat	5/5 stars
The Rolling Stone Jazz Record Guide	5/5 stars
Encyclopedia of Popular Music	5/5 stars
The Penguin Guide to Jazz Recordings	3.5/4 stars

Gerry Mulligan Meets Ben Webster, also simply called Meets Ben Webster, is a 1960 album featuring the November 3 - December 2 studio sessions of American jazz musicians Gerry Mulligan and Ben Webster. In a 2003 review, All That Jazz described this album as the most significant of Gerry Mulligan's work partnering other legendary figures of jazz. The album, as a "classic album from two giants", is featured in NPR's "Basic Jazz Record Library". Originally released on the Verve label, the album was reissued by the label many times (as well as by Mobile Fidelity) before being re-released in an expanded edition called Gerry Mulligan Meets Ben Webster (Complete) by Verve in 1997.

In 2000, it was voted number 448 in Colin Larkin's All Time Top 1000 Albums. He stated it is "a fine example of how two seemingly disparate musicians can perform together superbly."

== 1960 track listing ==
Except where otherwise indicated, all songs composed by Gerry Mulligan.

1. "Chelsea Bridge" (Billy Strayhorn) – 7:22
2. "The Cat Walk" (Mulligan, Ben Webster) – 5:47
3. "Sunday" (Chester Conn, Bennie Krueger, Nathan "Ned" Miller, Jule Styne) – 7:25
4. "Who's Got Rhythm" – 7:42
5. "Tell Me When" – 5:06
6. "Go Home" – 10:04

=== CD bonus tracks ===
7. "In a Mellow Tone" (Duke Ellington, Milt Gabler) – 6:57
8. "What Is This Thing Called Love?" (Cole Porter) – 7:28
9. "For Bessie" (Webster) – 5:41
10. "Fajista" (Webster) – 5:50
11. "Blues in B Flat" – 7:22

== 1997 "Complete" track listing" ==
Except where otherwise noted, all songs composed by Gerry Mulligan.

1. "In a Mellow Tone" (Ellington, Gabler) – 7:20
2. "In a Mellow Tone (alternate take)" (Ellington, Gabler) – 5:44
3. "What Is This Thing Called Love?" (Porter) – 7:22
4. "Chelsea Bridge (original LP master take)" (Strayhorn) – 7:39
5. "Chelsea Bridge (alternate take)" (Strayhorn) – 5:03
6. "Go Home (alternate take)" – 10:01
7. "Go Home (original LP master take)" – 6:54
8. "Who's Got Rhythm? (original LP master take)" – 7:26
9. "For Bessie" (Webster) – 5:38
10. "Go Home" (Mulligan, Webster) – 1:44
11. "Go Home" (Mulligan, Webster) – 1:30
12. "Fajista (alternate take)" (Webster) – 1:34
13. "Fajista (alternate take)" (Webster) – 6:21
14. "Fajista (alternate take)" (Webster) – 1:37
15. "Fajista" (Webster) – 5:58
16. "Tell Me When" – 5:02
17. "Tell Me When (alternate take)" – 5:29
18. "Blues in B Flat (alternate take)" – 2:46
19. "Blues in B Flat" – 8:38
20. "Blues in B Flat (alternate take)" – 7:23
21. "The Catwalk (alternate take)" – 3:26
22. "The Catwalk (alternate take)" – 5:45
23. "The Catwalk (original LP master take)" – 2:13
24. "The Catwalk (alternate take)" – 6:19
25. "Sunday" (Conn, Krueger, Miller, Styne) – 5:32
26. "Sunday" (Conn, Krueger, Miller, Styne) – 7:21

== Personnel ==
- Mel Lewis - drums
- Gerry Mulligan - baritone saxophone
- Jimmy Rowles - piano
- Leroy Vinnegar - double bass
- Ben Webster - tenor saxophone
- Norman Granz - producer
- Phil Schaap - liner notes
