= The Soul of Ben Webster =

Studio album by Ben Webster
- Released: 1959
- Recorded: July 1958; New York City
- Genre: Jazz
- Length: 44:55
- Label: Verve; MGV 8359
- Producer: Norman Granz

Ben Webster chronology
Coleman Hawkins Encounters Ben Webster (1957)	The Soul of Ben Webster (1959)	Ben Webster and Associates (1959)

The Soul of Ben Webster is an album by American jazz saxophonist Ben Webster featuring tracks recorded in 1958 for the Verve label.

== Reception ==
Professional ratings
Review scores
Source	Rating
Allmusic	4/5 stars

Allmusic awarded the album 4 stars with its review by Scott Yanow stating "The great tenor is at his best on a beautiful version of "Chelsea Bridge" and "When I Fall in Love"... Recommended".

== Track listing ==
All compositions by Ben Webster except as indicated

1. "Fajista" - 3:48
2. "Chelsea Bridge" (Billy Strayhorn) - 3:40
3. "Charlotte's Piccolo" - 15:31
4. "Coal Train" - 4:10
5. "When I Fall in Love" (Edward Heyman, Victor Young) - 4:59
6. "Ev's Mad" - 4:23
7. "Ash" - 8:24

== Personnel ==
- Ben Webster, Harold Ashby - tenor saxophone
- Art Farmer - trumpet
- Mundell Lowe - guitar
- Jimmy Jones - piano
- Milt Hinton - bass
- Dave Bailey - drums
