= The Genius of Coleman Hawkins =

Studio album by Coleman Hawkins
- Released: 1957
- Recorded: October 24, 1957
- Studio: Capitol (Hollywood)
- Genre: Jazz
- Length: 78:36 (1997 CD reissue)
- Label: Verve; MG V-8261 / MG VS-6033
- Producer: Norman Granz

Coleman Hawkins chronology
Coleman Hawkins Encounters Ben Webster (1957)	The Genius of Coleman Hawkins (1957)	Coleman Hawkins and Confrères (1958)

Professional ratings
Review scores
Source	Rating
Allmusic	4/5 stars
The Penguin Guide to Jazz Recordings	3.5/4 stars

The Genius of Coleman Hawkins is a 1957 album by tenor saxophonist Coleman Hawkins, featuring the Oscar Peterson quartet.

== Track listing ==
1. "I'll Never Be The Same" (Gus Kahn, Matty Malneck, Frank Signorelli) – 3:29
2. "You're Blasé" (Ord Hamilton, Bruce Sievier) – 3:35
3. "I Wished on the Moon" (Dorothy Parker, Ralph Rainger) – 3:38
4. "How Long Has This Been Going On?" (George Gershwin, Ira Gershwin) – 3:54
5. "Like Someone in Love" (Johnny Burke, Jimmy Van Heusen) – 3:55
6. "My Melancholy Baby" (Ernie Burnett, George Norton) – 4:08
7. "Ill Wind" (Harold Arlen, Ted Koehler) – 5:33
8. "In a Mellow Tone" (Duke Ellington, Milt Gabler) – 4:45
9. "There's No You" (Tom Adair, Hal Hopper) – 3:25
10. "The World Is Waiting for the Sunrise" (Eugene Lockhart, Ernest Seitz) – 3:49
11. "Somebody Loves Me" (G. Gershwin, Buddy DeSylva, Ballard MacDonald) – 3:51
12. "Blues for Rene" (Coleman Hawkins) – 3:03
  Bonus tracks included on the 1997 CD release:
13. "Begin the Beguine" (Cole Porter) – 3:02
14. "I Never Had a Chance" (Irving Berlin) – 2:06
15. "I Never Had a Chance" – 2:00
16. "I Wished on the Moon" – 3:37
17. "Like Someone in Love" – 3:55
18. "Ill Wind" – 5:35
19. "In a Mellow Tone" – 4:46
20. "There's No You" – 3:26
21. "Blues for Rene" – 3:04

== Personnel ==
=== Performance ===
- Coleman Hawkins – tenor saxophone
- Oscar Peterson – piano
- Herb Ellis – guitar
- Ray Brown – double bass
- Alvin Stoller – drums
