= Sax ala Carter! =

Studio album by Benny Carter Quartet
- Released: 1960
- Recorded: February 5, 1960
- Studio: Radio Recorders, Los Angeles, CA
- Genre: Jazz
- Length: 46:53
- Label: United Artists; UAL-4094/UAS-5094
- Producer: Max E. Youngstein

Benny Carter chronology
Aspects (1959)	Sax ala Carter! (1960)	Further Definitions (1961)

Sax ala Carter! is an album by saxophonist/composer Benny Carter, recorded in 1960 and released on the United Artists label.

== Reception ==
Professional ratings
Review scores
Source	Rating
AllMusic	3/5 stars
The Guardian	3/5 stars
Tom Hull	A−
The Penguin Guide to Jazz	3/4 stars

AllMusic reviewer Ronnie D. Lankford, Jr. stated: "the songs are popular standards and the renditions offered here are fairly short (none reach the four-minute mark). Having said all this, one might expect Sax ala Carter! to resemble cocktail jazz, but it doesn't. Instead, the listener is treated to an intimate set made up of fine ensemble work ... Incredibly, this entire album was recorded in one day on February 5, 1960. A fun treat."

The Village Voice critic Tom Hull found the album "exquisite" and "prime" Carter, while saying of his band: "A quartet with Jimmy Rowles, Leroy Vinnegar, and Mel Lewis, perfect support for the great swing saxophonist. Few have matched the sheer beauty of Carter's tone, and not even Johnny Hodges could string together a solo with the elegance and precision that Carter invariably possessed."

The Guardian's John Fordham observed: "Carter's sound seems to embody the pragmatically sensual, life-embracing ease that characterises the jazz of the pre-bop era – though as an immensely sophisticated musician, Carter's improvising was full of modern audacities. This is a conventional and easy-swinging set – but the pleading romantic tremor in the ballad playing, the suggestively swivelling slurs and the almost Bird-like brittleness on 'For All We Know' all testify to a master in his prime."

All About Jazz reviewer Mitchell Seidel wrote: "Brevity being the soul of wit, nearly all of the selections weigh in at about three minutes apiece, yet Carter and company manage to cram a lot of playing into each cut. ... Carter shows you can wring a lot out of a tune before getting to a formal solo. Rowles is, at times, downright ebullient, in both his accompaniment and his solos, similarly cramming a lot of ideas into limited space without sounding forced or contrived. ...The backing of the trio is typically rock-solid for a Carter small group, with Vinnegar and Lewis providing the leader with the strong support he liked. Lewis plays with a forcefulness that he displayed with larger ensembles of the time."

== Track listing ==
1. "And the Angels Sing" (Ziggy Elman, Johnny Mercer) – 2:58
2. "Everything I Have Is Yours" (Burton Lane, Harold Adamson) – 3:36
3. "Understand" (Mabel Wayne, Kim Gannon) – 3:07
4. "All or Nothing at All" (Arthur Altman, Jack Lawrence) – 3:18
5. "I'll Never Smile Again" (Ruth Lowe) – 2:24
6. "If I Loved You" (Richard Rodgers, Oscar Hammerstein II) – 3:46
7. "Far Away Places" (Alex Kramer, Joan Whitney) – 3:25
8. "I Should Care" (Axel Stordahl, Paul Weston, Sammy Cahn) – 4:00
9. "For All We Know" (J. Fred Coots, Sam M. Lewis) – 3:02
10. "I Don't Stand a Ghost of a Chance" (Victor Young, Bing Crosby, Ned Washington) – 2:50
11. "The One I Love" (Isham Jones, Gus Kahn) – 3:07
12. "Moon of Manakoora" (Alfred Newman, Frank Loesser) – 2:42
13. "Ennui" (Benny Carter) – 2:21 Additional track on CD reissue
14. "Friendly Islands" (Carter) – 3:10 Additional track on CD reissue
15. "Friendly Islands" [alternate take] (Carter) – 3:07 Additional track on CD reissue

== Personnel ==
- Benny Carter – alto saxophone, soprano saxophone on "Ennui", tenor saxophone on "Friendly Islands"
- Jimmy Rowles – piano
- Leroy Vinnegar – bass
- Mel Lewis – drums
