= Coleman Hawkins Encounters Ben Webster =

Studio album by Coleman Hawkins and Ben Webster
- Released: November 1959
- Recorded: October 16, 1957; Los Angeles
- Genre: Jazz
- Length: 36:11
- Label: Verve; MG V-8327 / MG VS-6066

Coleman Hawkins chronology
The Coleman Hawkins, Roy Eldridge, Pete Brown, Jo Jones All Stars at Newport (1957)	Coleman Hawkins Encounters Ben Webster (1959)	The Genius of Coleman Hawkins (1957)

Ben Webster chronology
Soulville (1957)	Coleman Hawkins Encounters Ben Webster (1957)	The Soul of Ben Webster (1958)

Professional ratings
Review scores
Source	Rating
AllMusic	4/5 stars
DownBeat	3.5/5 stars
The Rolling Stone Jazz Record Guide	4/5 stars
The Penguin Guide to Jazz Recordings	4/4 stars

Coleman Hawkins Encounters Ben Webster (known as Blue Saxophones in the U.K.) is a studio album recorded on October 16, 1957, by Coleman Hawkins and Ben Webster, accompanied by a rhythm section led by Oscar Peterson.

== Track listing ==
1. "Blues for Yolande" (Coleman Hawkins) – 6:44
2. "It Never Entered My Mind" (Richard Rodgers, Lorenz Hart) – 5:47
3. "La Rosita" (Paul Dupont, Allan Stuart) – 5:02
4. "You'd Be So Nice to Come Home To" (Cole Porter) – 4:15
5. "Prisoner of Love" (Russ Columbo, Clarence Gaskill, Leo Robin) – 4:13
6. "Tangerine" (Johnny Mercer, Victor Schertzinger) – 5:21
7. "Shine On, Harvest Moon" (Jack Norworth, Nora Bayes) – 4:49

== Personnel ==
- Coleman Hawkins – tenor saxophone
- Ben Webster – tenor saxophone
- Oscar Peterson – piano
- Herb Ellis – guitar
- Ray Brown – double bass
- Alvin Stoller – drums
