= The Peacocks (album) =

Studio album by Jimmie Rowles and Stan Getz
- Released: 1977
- Recorded: July 1975; New York City
- Genre: Jazz
- Length: 58:44
- Label: Columbia; JC 34873
- Producer: Stan Getz

Stan Getz chronology
| The Best of Two Worlds (1975) | The Peacocks (1977) | The Master (1975) |

The Peacocks is an album by pianist Jimmy Rowles featuring saxophonist/album producer Stan Getz which was recorded in 1975 and released on the Columbia label in 1977. The album was one of several released in the 1960s and 1970s where Rowles spelled his first name as "Jimmie".

== Reception ==
Professional ratings
Review scores
| Source | Rating |
|---|---|
| AllMusic | 4/5 stars |
| The Rolling Stone Jazz Record Guide | 3/5 stars |

The AllMusic review by Michael G. Nastos stated "With few Jimmy Rowles recordings in the world, this has to rank as his best, clearly the most entertaining, and a project Getz was ever proud to bring to the jazz world. It is definitive, deserving of the Columbia Jazz Masterpieces tag, and a must-have item in your modern jazz collection".

== Track listing ==
1. "I'll Never Be the Same" (Matty Malneck, Frank Signorelli, Gus Kahn) – 4:07
2. "Lester Left Town" (Wayne Shorter) – 5:53
3. "Body and Soul" (Johnny Green, Frank Eyton, Edward Heyman, Robert Sour) – 5:51
4. "What Am I Here For?" (Duke Ellington, Frankie Laine) – 4:57
5. "Serenade to Sweden" (Ellington) – 5:39
6. "The Chess Players" (Shorter) – 5:43
7. "The Peacocks" (Jimmy Rowles) – 5:42
8. "My Buddy" (Walter Donaldson, Kahn) – 4:26
9. "The Hour of Parting" (Mischa Spoliansky) – 3:35
10. "Rose Marie" (Rudolf Friml, Herbert Stothart, Otto Harbach, Oscar Hammerstein II) – 2:54
11. "This Is All I Ask" (Gordon Jenkins) – 4:23
12. "Skylark" (Hoagy Carmichael, Johnny Mercer) – 4:01
13. "Mosaic/Would You Like to Take a Walk?" (Cedar Walton/Harry Warren, Mort Dixon, Billy Rose) – 1:33

== Personnel ==
- Stan Getz – tenor saxophone (tracks 1, 2 & 4–13)
- Jimmy Rowles (as "Jimmie Rowles") – piano, vocals
- Buster Williams – bass (tracks 2, 6, 8, 10 & 11)
- Elvin Jones – drums (tracks 2, 6, 8, 10 & 11)
- Beverly Getz (track 6), Jon Hendricks (track 6), Judy Hendricks (track 6), Michele Hendricks (track 6) – vocals
