= Ben Webster and Associates =

Studio album by Ben Webster
- Released: 1959
- Recorded: April 9, 1959; New York City
- Genre: Jazz
- Length: 45:03
- Label: Verve; MGV 8318
- Producer: Norman Granz

Ben Webster chronology
The Soul of Ben Webster (1958)	Ben Webster and Associates (1959)	Gerry Mulligan Meets Ben Webster (1959)

Ben Webster and Associates is an album by American jazz saxophonist Ben Webster featuring tracks recorded in 1959 for the Verve label.

== Reception ==
Professional ratings
Review scores
Source	Rating
Allmusic	4.5/5 stars
The Rolling Stone Jazz Record Guide	4/5 stars

Allmusic awarded the album 4½ stars with its review by Al Cambell stating: "Ben Webster and Associates is a 1959 session that took full advantage of the long-playing LP format. Highlighted by the 20-minute version of Ellington's 'In a Mellow Tone' (taking up the entirety of side one) in which tenor titans Ben Webster, Coleman Hawkins, and Budd Johnson plus trumpeter Roy Eldridge stretch out, not so much in a cutting contest as a laid-back jam session amongst friends. This summit meeting turned out to be a tribute to another tenor master of the same generation, Lester Young, who had died less than four weeks before this session".

== Track listing ==
All compositions by Ben Webster except as indicated

1. "In a Mellow Tone" (Duke Ellington, Milt Gabler) - 20:16
2. "De-Dar" - 4:39
3. "Young Bean" - 6:02
4. "Time After Time" (Sammy Cahn, Jule Styne) - 4:35
5. "Budd Johnson" - 9:02

== Personnel ==
- Ben Webster, Coleman Hawkins, Budd Johnson - tenor saxophone
- Roy Eldridge - trumpet
- Les Spann - guitar
- Jimmy Jones - piano
- Ray Brown - bass
- Jo Jones - drums
