= For Lady Day =

Studio album by Zoot Sims
- Released: 1991
- Recorded: April 10 & 11, 1978
- Studio: New York City
- Genre: Jazz
- Length: 47:55
- Label: Pablo; 2310 942
- Producer: Norman Granz

Zoot Sims chronology
If I'm Lucky (1977)	For Lady Day (1991)	Warm Tenor (1978)

For Lady Day is an album by saxophonist Zoot Sims, recorded in 1978 but not released by the Pablo label until 1991.

== Reception ==
Professional ratings
Review scores
Source	Rating
AllMusic	4.5/5 stars
The Penguin Guide to Jazz Recordings	3.5/4 stars

AllMusic reviewer Scott Yanow stated that "tenor saxophonist Zoot Sims and pianist Jimmy Rowles' tribute to Billie Holiday is melodic, tasteful, and largely memorable ... they perform 11 songs associated with Holiday, including quite a few that would have been lost in obscurity if Lady Day had not uplifted them with her recordings... A lyrical and heartfelt tribute".

== Track listing ==
1. "Easy Living" (Ralph Rainger, Leo Robin) – 3:42
2. "That Old Devil Called Love" (Allan Roberts, Doris Fisher) – 5:01
3. "Some Other Spring" (Arthur Herzog Jr., Irene Kitchings) – 4:57
4. "I Cover the Waterfront" (Johnny Green, Edward Heyman) – 4:26
5. "You Go to My Head" (J. Fred Coots, Haven Gillespie) – 5:49
6. "I Cried for You" (Gus Arnheim, Abe Lyman, Arthur Freed) – 4:31
7. "Body and Soul" (Green, Heyman, Frank Eyton, Robert Sour) – 3:21
8. "Trav'lin' Light" (Trummy Young, Jimmy Mundy, Johnny Mercer) – 4:48
9. "You're My Thrill" (Jay Gorney, Sidney Clare) – 3:45
10. "No More" (Tutti Camarata, Bob Russell) – 3:04
11. "My Man" (Maurice Yvain, Jacques Charles, Albert Willemetz, Channing Pollock) – 5:19

== Personnel ==
- Zoot Sims – tenor saxophone
- Jimmy Rowles – piano
- George Mraz – bass
- Jackie Williams – drums
