= Jimmy Rowles =

American jazz pianist, vocalist, and composer (1918–96)

- Born: James George Hunter; August 19, 1918; Spokane, Washington, U.S.
- Died: May 28, 1996 (aged 77) Burbank, California, U.S.
- Genres: Jazz
- Occupation: Musician
- Instrument(s): Piano, vocals
- Years active: 1940–1980s

James George Hunter (August 19, 1918 – May 28, 1996), known professionally as Jimmy Rowles (sometimes spelled Jimmie Rowles), was an American jazz pianist, vocalist, and composer. As a bandleader and accompanist, he explored multiple styles including swing and cool jazz.

== Music career ==
Rowles was born in Spokane, Washington, and attended Gonzaga University in that city. After moving to Los Angeles, he joined Lester Young's group in 1942. He also worked with Benny Goodman, Woody Herman, Les Brown, Tommy Dorsey, and Tony Bennett, and as a studio musician.

=== With female singers ===
Rowles was praised as an accompanist by female singers. He recorded Sarah Vaughan with the Jimmy Rowles Quintet with Sarah Vaughan and accompanied Carmen McRae on her 1972 live album The Great American Songbook. McRae described Rowles as "the guy every girl singer in her right mind would like to work with".

In the 1950s and 1960s, he frequently played behind Billie Holiday and Peggy Lee. In the 1980s, he succeeded Paul Smith as Ella Fitzgerald's accompanist. In late 1956 he performed with Fitzgerald at the Mocambo nightclub in Hollywood; from then on, he appeared on several recording sessions with Ella in the 1960s before joining her in 1981 for nearly three years. Rowles appeared, in 1982, on Fitzgerald's final collaboration with Nelson Riddle, The Best Is Yet to Come. His song "Baby, Don't You Quit Now", written with Johnny Mercer, was recorded on her final album, All That Jazz, released in 1989.

In 1983, Rowles worked with Diana Krall in Los Angeles, shortly after she moved from the Berklee College of Music in Boston. He developed her playing abilities and encouraged her to add singing to her repertoire. In 1994, he accompanied jazz singer Jeri Brown on A Timeless Place, the only album containing only his own compositions.

=== Compositions ===
"The Peacocks" is Rowles's best known composition; it has been recorded on the 1975 album of the same name with Stan Getz, and subsequently by Gary Foster, John McLaughlin, Esperanza Spalding, Bill Evans, and other artists. Singer Norma Winstone wrote lyrics for the composition and recorded it under the title "A Timeless Place". "The Peacocks" is performed in the soundtrack of Bertrand Tavernier's movie Round Midnight.

Rowles' 1958 composition "502 Blues" gained wide exposure from Wayne Shorter's 1966 recording. "502 Blues" was subsequently included in the Real Book, a collection of jazz sheet music widely used by students and professionals when playing jam sessions and casual gigs.

Rowles's piano work was featured prominently on the DePatie-Freleng Enterprises cartoon series The Ant and the Aardvark (1969–1971).

In 1986 the 14th of September was declared “Jimmie Rowles Day” in Los Angeles.

Rowles died in 1996 of cardiac arrest in Burbank, California, aged 77. His daughter, Stacy (September 11, 1955 – October 30, 2009), was a jazz trumpeter, singer, and flugelhornist. His son Gary played guitar with Eric Burdon and Arthur Lee's band Love.

== Discography ==
=== As leader/coleader ===
- 1954 Rare, But Well Done (Liberty)
- 1957 Bill Harris and Friends (Fantasy)
- 1958 Let's Get Acquainted with Jazz (for People Who Hate Jazz) (Tampa, reissued by VSOP)
- 1958 Weather in a Jazz Vane (Andex, reissued by VSOP)
- 1959 Upper Classmen (Interlude)
- 1960 Fiorello Uptown, Mary Sunshine Downtown (Signature)
- 1962 Kinda Groovy (Capitol)
- 1968 Our Delight (VSOP)
- 1972 Some Other Spring (Blue Angel)
- 1974 Jazz Is a Fleeting Moment (Jazzz)
- 1974 The Special Magic of Jimmy Rowles (Halcyon)
- 1975 The Peacocks (Columbia) with Stan Getz
- 1976 Grandpaws (Choice) (reissued in 2014 as Jam Face Choice CD)
- 1976 Paws That Refresh (Choice) (reissued in 2010 as The Chess Players, Choice CD)
- 1976 Music's the Only Thing That's on My Mind (Audiophile)
- 1977 Heavy Love (Xanadu) with Al Cohn
- 1978 Isfahan (Sonet)
- 1978 Shade and Light (Ahead)
- 1978 Jimmy Rowles Trio on Tour (SIR)
- 1978 We Could Make Such Beautiful Music Together (Xanadu)
- 1978 Nature Boy (Musica)
- 1978 Scarab (Musica)
- 1978 Red'n Me (Dreyfus)
- 1979 Duets (Cymbol) w Joe Newman
- 1979 Tasty! (Concord Jazz)
- 1979 My mother's love (PolJazz)
- 1979 Grandpa's Vibrato (Black & Blue 2002)
- 1979 Ellington by Rowles (Cymbol)
- 1980 Jimmy Rowles in Paris (Columbia)
- 1981 Plays Ellington and Billy Strayhorn (Columbia)
- 1981 Profile/The music of Henri Renaud (Columbia)
- 1981 Checkmate (Pablo) with Joe Pass
- 1983 Peacocks (Stash) with Michael Hashim
- 1985 The Jimmy Rowles/Red Mitchell Trio (Contemporary)
- 1985 I'm Glad There Is You: Jimmy Rowles, Vol. 2 (Contemporary)
- 1988 Looking Back (Delos)
- 1988 Sometimes I'm Happy, Sometimes I'm Blue (Orange Blue)
- 1989 Plus 2, Plus 3, Plus 4 (JVC)
- 1989 Remember When (Master Mix)
- 1990 Trio (Capri)
- 1994 Lilac Time (Kokopelli)
- 1995 A Timeless Place (Justin Time) (w Jeri Brown)

=== As sideman ===
With Pepper Adams

- Critics' Choice (World Pacific, 1957)
- Urban Dreams (Palo Alto, 1981)

With Louie Bellson

- Skin Deep (Norgran, 1953)
- Music, Romance and Especially Love (Verve, 1957)

With Bob Brookmeyer

- Bob Brookmeyer Plays Bob Brookmeyer and Some Others (Clef, 1955)
- Back Again (Sonet, 1978)

With Hoagy Carmichael

- Hoagy Sings Carmichael (Pacific Jazz, 1956)

With Benny Carter

- Jazz Giant (Contemporary, 1958) – two tracks
- Sax ala Carter! (United Artists, 1960)
- BBB & Co. (Swingville, 1962) with Ben Webster and Barney Bigard

With Nat King Cole

- L-O-V-E (Capitol, 1965)

With Harry Edison

- Sweets (Clef, 1956)

With Ella Fitzgerald

- Whisper Not (Verve, 1967)
- The Best Is Yet to Come (Pablo, 1982)
- All That Jazz (Pablo, 1989)

With Stan Getz

- Stan Getz and the Cool Sounds (Verve, 1953–55, [1957])
- The Peacocks (Columbia, 1975)

With Jimmy Giuffre

- The Jimmy Giuffre Clarinet (Atlantic, 1956)
- Ad Lib (Verve, 1959)

With Woody Herman

- Songs for Hip Lovers (Verve, 1957)

With Billie Holiday

- Songs for Distingué Lovers (Verve, 1957)

With Barney Kessel

- To Swing or Not to Swing (Contemporary, 1955)
- Music to Listen to Barney Kessel By (Contemporary, 1956)
- Let's Cook! (Contemporary, 1957 [1962])
- Some Like It Hot (Contemporary, 1959)

With Lee Konitz

- Tenorlee (Choice, 1978)

With Julie London

- Julie (Liberty, 1957)
- Julie...At Home (Liberty, 1960)

With Herbie Mann

- Great Ideas of Western Mann (Riverside, 1957)
- The Magic Flute of Herbie Mann (Verve, 1957)

With Carmen McRae

- The Great American Songbook (Atlantic, 1972)

With Gerry Mulligan

- Gerry Mulligan Quartet Volume 1 (2 CD tracks) (Pacific Jazz, 1952)
- Gerry Mulligan Meets Ben Webster (Verve 1959)

With Mark Murphy

- This Could Be the Start of Something (Capitol, 1958)
- Mark Murphy's Hip Parade (Capitol, 1959)
- Playing the Field (Capitol, 1960)

With Buddy Rich

- The Wailing Buddy Rich (Norgran, 1955)

With Nelson Riddle

- NAT: An Orchestral Portrait of Nat "King" Cole (Reprise, 1966)

With Pete Rugolo

- The Music from Richard Diamond (EmArcy, 1959)
- The Original Music of Thriller (Time, 1961)
- 10 Saxophones and 2 Basses (Mercury, 1961)

With Bud Shank

- Bud Shank - Shorty Rogers - Bill Perkins (Pacific Jazz, 1955)

With Zoot Sims

- Party (Choice, 1976)
- If I'm Lucky (Pablo, 1977)
- For Lady Day (Pablo, 1978 [1991])
- Warm Tenor (Pablo, 1978)
- Passion Flower (Pablo, 1979)
- I Wish I Were Twins (Pablo, 1980)
- The Swinger (Pablo, 1982)
- Suddenly It's Spring (Pablo, 1983)
- Live in San Francisco 1978 (Fog, 2014)

With Sonny Stitt

- Sonny Stitt Plays Jimmy Giuffre Arrangements (Verve, 1959)

With The 5th Dimension

- Stoned Soul Picnic (The 5th Dimension album) (Soul City, 1968)

With Ben Webster

- Ben Webster at the Renaissance (Contemporary, 1960)

With Buster Williams

- Heartbeat (Muse, 1978)

With Gerald Wilson

- California Soul (Pacific Jazz, 1968)

With Phil Woods and Lew Tabackin

- Phil Woods/Lew Tabackin (Omnisound, 1981)

With Henry Mancini

- Experiment in Terror (RCA Victor, 1962)
- Uniquely Mancini (RCA Victor, 1963)
- Charade (RCA Victor, 1963)
- The Pink Panther (RCA Victor, 1963)
- The Latin Sound of Henry Mancini (RCA Victor, 1965)
- Mancini '67 (RCA Victor, 1967)
- The Party (RCA Victor, 1968)
