= The Great American Songbook (Carmen McRae album) =

Live album by Carmen McRae
- Released: June 1972
- Recorded: November 6, 1971
- Venue: Donte's, Los Angeles
- Genre: Vocal jazz
- Length: 1:11:17
- Label: Atlantic SD2-904
- Producer: Jack Rael

Carmen McRae chronology
November Girl (1970)	The Great American Songbook (1972)	It Takes a Whole Lot of Human Feeling (1973)

The Great American Songbook is a 1972 live album by Carmen McRae, accompanied by a jazz quartet including Jimmy Rowles and Joe Pass. McRae was a great fan of Rowles and described him in the liner notes to the album as "the guy every girl singer in her right mind would like to work with". Rowles's humorous country and western song, "The Ballad of Thelonious Monk", is featured on the album.

== Reception ==
Professional ratings
Review scores
Source	Rating
Allmusic	5/5 stars
The Penguin Guide to Jazz Recordings	3.5/4 stars

Reviewing the album for AllMusic, Scott Yanow wrote that McRae "...had what was at the time a rare opportunity to record a live, spontaneous, jazz-oriented set. She sounds quite enthusiastic about both her accompaniment and the strong repertoire". Phyl Garland, reviewing the album for Ebony magazine, wrote that "this is one of the finest heaping portions of McRae in ages...it captures her banter between song all the wit of a mature woman rapping about how to make it in any situation." Garland described "If the Moon Turns Green" and "I Thought About You" as "masterpieces of delicacy and phrasing". Billboard magazine described the album as a "sensational performance...the lady is beautiful, lending her own interpretations and great style to the lucky composers and stylists".

Diana Krall said in an interview that she wishes she had been present at this performance as "Those were the days when they were singing songs, and they weren't into worrying about whether you scat sang or not. You knew you were a jazz singer by the way you approached things".

== Track listing ==
1. "Satin Doll" (Duke Ellington, Billy Strayhorn, Johnny Mercer) – 4:34
2. "At Long Last Love" (Cole Porter) – 2:26
3. "If the Moon Turns Green" (Bernie Hanighen, Paul Coates) – 4:26
4. "Day by Day" (Axel Stordahl, Paul Weston, Sammy Cahn) – 2:23
5. "What Are You Doing the Rest of Your Life?" (Michel Legrand, Alan and Marilyn Bergman) – 4:14
6. "I Only Have Eyes for You" (Harry Warren, Al Dubin) – 4:13
7. Medley: "Easy Living"/"Days of Wine and Roses"/"It's Impossible" (Ralph Rainger, Leo Robin/Henry Mancini, Mercer/Armando Manzanero, Sid Wayne) – 9:45
8. "Sunday" (Chester Conn, Benny Krueger, Ned Miller, Jule Styne) – 4:25
9. "A Song for You" (Leon Russell) – 4:34
10. "I Cried for You" (Gus Arnheim, Abe Lyman, Arthur Freed) – 1:50
11. "Behind the Face" (Jimmy Rowles, Jimmy McHugh) – 2:38
12. "The Ballad of Thelonious Monk" (Rowles, McHugh) – 3:29
13. "There's No Such Thing as Love" (Anthony Newley, Ian Fraser) – 5:01
14. "(They Long to Be) Close to You" (Burt Bacharach, Hal David) – 4:38
15. "Three Little Words" (Harry Ruby, Bert Kalmar) – 2:54
16. "Mr. Ugly" (Norman Mapp) – 3:35
17. "It's Like Reaching for the Moon" (Al Sherman, Gerald Marqusee, Al Lewis) – 2:53
18. "I Thought About You" (Jimmy Van Heusen, Mercer) – 3:25

== Personnel ==
- Carmen McRae – vocals, piano on "If the Moon Turns Green" and "Mr Ugly"
- Jimmy Rowles – piano
- Joe Pass – guitar
- Chuck Domanico – double bass
- Chuck Flores – drums

Production

- Jack Rael – producer
- Ray Thompson – engineer
- Michael Cuscuna – remix supervision
- Gene Paul – remixing
- Zal Schreiber – mastering
- Ira Friedlander – design
- Paul Slaughter – photography
- Carmen McRae – liner notes
