= Ben Webster Meets Oscar Peterson =

Studio album by Ben Webster & Oscar Peterson
- Released: 1960
- Recorded: November 6, 1959
- Studios: United Recorders; Hollywood, CA
- Genre: Jazz
- Length: 36:25
- Label: Verve
- Producer: Norman Granz

Ben Webster chronology
Gerry Mulligan Meets Ben Webster (1960)	Ben Webster Meets Oscar Peterson (1960)	Ben Webster at the Renaissance (1960)

Oscar Peterson chronology
Swinging Brass with the Oscar Peterson Trio (1960)	Ben Webster Meets Oscar Peterson (1960)	Fiorello! (1960)

Ben Webster Meets Oscar Peterson is a studio album by American jazz saxophonist Ben Webster backed by the Oscar Peterson Trio, featuring rhythm section Ray Brown and Ed Thigpen, recorded on November 6, 1959 and released on Verve the following year.

== Reception ==
Professional ratings
Review scores
Source	Rating
AllMusic	4.5/5 stars
The Encyclopedia of Popular Music	5/5 stars
The Penguin Guide to Jazz Recordings	4/4 stars

For AllMusic, critic Stephen Cook wrote, "Another fine Webster release on Verve that sees the tenor great once again backed by the deluxe Oscar Peterson Trio... To reassure Peterson fans worried about scant solo time for their hero, the pianist lays down a healthy number of extended runs, unobtrusively shadowing Webster's vaporous tone and supple phrasing along the way. Not only a definite first-disc choice for Webster newcomers, but one of the jazz legend's all-time great records."

== Track listing ==
1. "The Touch of Your Lips" (Ray Noble) – 6:20
2. "When Your Lover Has Gone" (Einar Aaron Swan) – 3:59
3. "Bye Bye Blackbird" (Mort Dixon, Ray Henderson) – 6:45
4. "How Deep Is the Ocean?" (Irving Berlin) – 2:36
5. "In the Wee Small Hours of the Morning" (Bob Hilliard, David Mann) – 3:13
6. "Sunday" (Chester Conn, Benny Krueger, Nathan "Ned" Miller, Jule Styne) – 3:57
7. "This Can't Be Love" (Lorenz Hart, Richard Rodgers) – 9:51

== Personnel ==
- Ben Webster – tenor saxophone
- Oscar Peterson – piano
- Ray Brown – double bass
- Ed Thigpen – drums

== Charts ==
Chart performance for Ben Webster Meets Oscar Peterson
Chart (2025)	Peak position
Greek Albums (IFPI)	31
