= Soulmates (Ben Webster and Joe Zawinul album) =

Studio album by Ben Webster and Joe Zawinul
- Released: 1963
- Recorded: September 20 & October 14, 1963; New York City
- Genre: Jazz
- Length: 42:03
- Labels: Riverside; RLP 476

Ben Webster chronology
Wanted to Do One Together (1962)	Soulmates (1963)	See You at the Fair (1964)

Joe Zawinul chronology
To You With Love (1961)	Soulmates (1963)	Money in the Pocket (1966)

Soulmates is an album by saxophonist Ben Webster and pianist Joe Zawinul featuring tracks recorded in 1963 for the Riverside label.

== Reception ==
Professional ratings
Review scores
Source	Rating
AllMusic	4/5 stars
The Penguin Guide to Jazz Recordings	3/4 stars
The Rolling Stone Jazz Record Guide	4/5 stars

AllMusic's review by Jim Todd stated, "What initially seems like an unlikely pairing for this session delivers on its unique pedigree with performances that do full justice to tenor legend Ben Webster and to the then up and coming pianist Joe Zawinul".

== Track listing ==
1. "Too Late Now" (Burton Lane, Alan Jay Lerner) - 6:26
2. "Soulmates" (Ben Webster) - 6:32
3. "Come Sunday" (Duke Ellington) - 5:10
4. "The Governor" (Ben Webster) - 3:13
5. "Frog Legs" (Joe Zawinul) - 5:29
6. "Trav'lin' Light" (Johnny Mercer, Jimmy Mundy, Trummy Young) - 6:08
7. "Like Someone in Love" (Johnny Burke, Jimmy Van Heusen) - 3:45
8. "Evol Deklaw Ni" (Thad Jones) - 5:20
- Recorded in New York City on September 20 (tracks 1, 3, 6–7) and October 14 (tracks 2, 4–5 & 8), 1963

== Personnel ==
- Ben Webster - tenor saxophone
- Joe Zawinul - piano
- Thad Jones - cornet (tracks 2, 4–5 & 8)
- Richard Davis - bass (tracks 1, 3, 6–7)
- Sam Jones - bass (tracks 2, 4–5 & 8)
- Philly Joe Jones - drums
