= Ben Webster =

American jazz saxophonist (1909–1973)

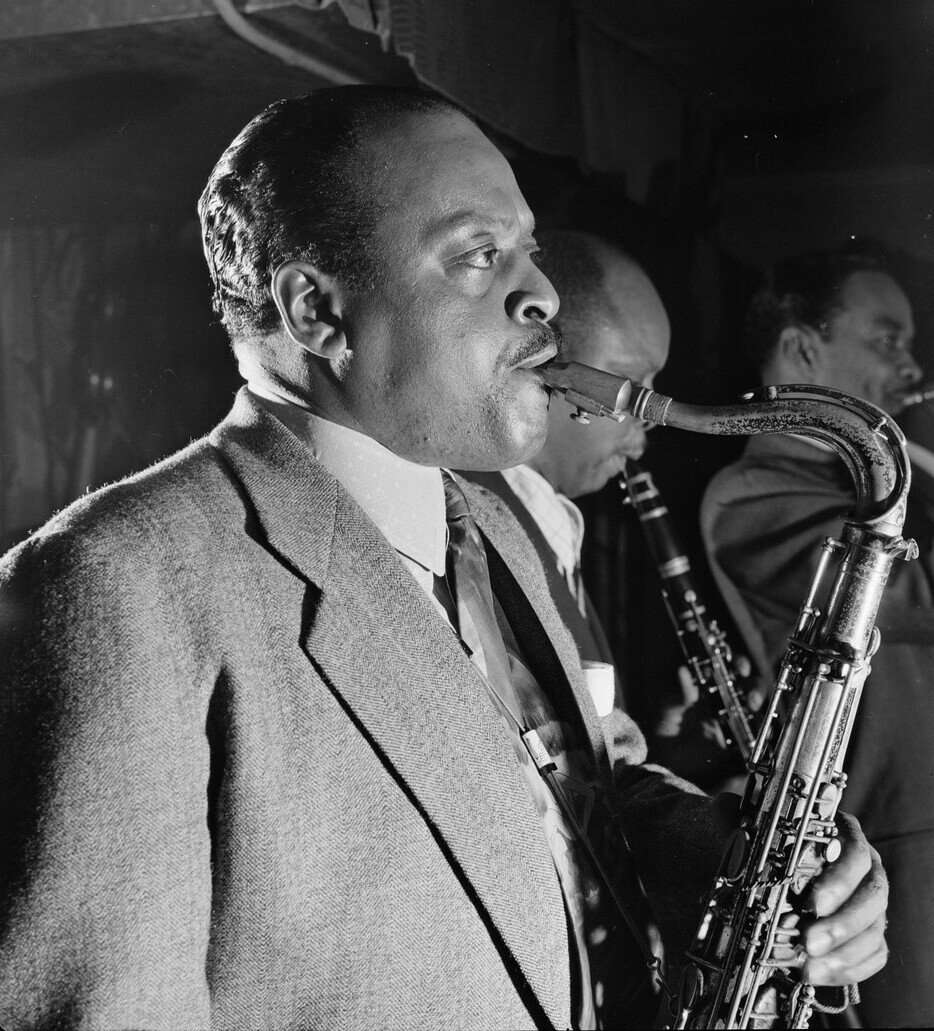
- Webster c. 1946

Background information
- Born: Benjamin Francis Webster; March 27, 1909; Kansas City, Missouri U.S.
- Died: September 20, 1973 (aged 64) Amsterdam, Netherlands
- Genre: Jazz
- Occupation: Musician
- Instrument: Tenor saxophone
- Years active: 1929–1973
- Labels: Verve Records, Riverside Records
- Formerly of: Duke Ellington Orchestra

Benjamin Francis Webster (March 27, 1909 – September 20, 1973) was an American jazz tenor saxophonist. He performed in the United States and Europe and made many recordings with Duke Ellington, Billie Holiday, Johnny Hodges, and others.

== Career ==
=== Early life and career ===
A native of Kansas City, Missouri, Webster studied violin, learned how to play blues on the piano from Pete Johnson, and received saxophone lessons from Budd Johnson. Webster played with Lester Young in the Young Family Band. He recorded with Blanche Calloway and became a member of the Bennie Moten Orchestra with Count Basie, Hot Lips Page, and Walter Page. During the 1930s, Webster played in bands led by Willie Bryant, Benny Carter, Cab Calloway, Fletcher Henderson, Andy Kirk, and Teddy Wilson.

=== With Ellington ===
Webster was a soloist with the Duke Ellington Orchestra starting in 1940, appearing on "Cotton Tail". He considered Johnny Hodges, an alto saxophonist in the Ellington Orchestra, a major influence on his playing. Gunther Schuller wrote in 1989, that Hodges' influence pushed him away from his original inspiration by Coleman Hawkins. Webster became close to Jimmy Blanton and Billy Strayhorn, the other two newcomers to Ellington's orbit.

Webster's personality, however, proved difficult for most members of the orchestra and for Ellington. It was not possible, according to Mercer Ellington, for his father and the saxophonist to be in the same room without an argument developing. Webster cried when he heard Blanton had died, but as baritone player Harry Carney recalled, "After he had a drink or two, he'd change". Webster left the band in 1943. Reportedly, he cut one of Ellington's sports jackets with a razor as one of his last acts as a member of the Ellington orchestra. Clark Terry said the departure was because Webster slapped Ellington.

=== Later American career ===
Webster worked on 52nd Street in New York City, where he recorded frequently as a leader and sideman. During this time he worked with Raymond Scott, John Kirby, Bill DeArango, Sid Catlett, Jay McShann, and Jimmy Witherspoon. For a few months in 1948, he returned briefly to Ellington's orchestra.

In 1953, he recorded The Consummate Artistry of Ben Webster (now known as King of the Tenors) with pianist Oscar Peterson, who would be an important collaborator with Webster throughout the decade in his recordings for the various labels of Norman Granz. Along with Peterson, trumpeter Harry "Sweets" Edison and others, he was touring and recording with Granz's Jazz at the Philharmonic package. In 1956, he recorded an album with pianist Art Tatum, supported by bassist Red Callender and drummer Bill Douglass. Coleman Hawkins Encounters Ben Webster with fellow tenor saxophonist Coleman Hawkins was recorded on December 16, 1957, along with Peterson, Herb Ellis (guitar), Ray Brown (bass), and Alvin Stoller (drums). The Hawkins and Webster recording saw the coming together of two giants of the tenor saxophone, who had first met back in Kansas City.

In the late 1950s, he formed a quintet with Gerry Mulligan and played frequently at a club in Los Angeles called Renaissance. It was there that the Webster-Mulligan group backed up blues singer Jimmy Witherspoon on an album recorded live for the Hi-Fi Jazz label. That same year, 1959, the quintet, with pianist Jimmy Rowles, bassist Leroy Vinnegar, and drummer Mel Lewis, also recorded Gerry Mulligan Meets Ben Webster for Verve Records.

=== In Europe ===
Webster worked steadily, but in late 1964 he moved to Europe, working with other expatriate American jazz musicians and local musicians. He played when he pleased during his last decade. He lived in London and several locations in Scandinavia for one year, followed by three years in Amsterdam, and made his last home in Copenhagen in 1969. Webster appeared as a sax player in a low-rent cabaret club in the 1970 Danish blue film titled Quiet Days in Clichy. In 1971, Webster reunited with Duke Ellington and his orchestra for a couple of shows at the Tivoli Gardens in Copenhagen; he also recorded live in France with Earl Hines. He also recorded or performed with Buck Clayton, Bill Coleman and Teddy Wilson.

Webster suffered a stroke in Amsterdam in September 1973, following a performance at the Twee Spieghels in Leiden, and died on September 20. His body was cremated in Copenhagen and his ashes were buried in the Assistens Cemetery in the Nørrebro section of the city.

Webster's private collection of jazz recordings and memorabilia is archived in the jazz collections at the University Library of Southern Denmark, Odense.

Ben Webster used the same saxophone from 1938 until his death in 1973. He left instructions that the horn was never to be played again. It is on display in the Institute of Jazz Studies at Rutgers University in Newark, New Jersey.

Ben Webster has a street named after him in southern Copenhagen, "Ben Websters Vej".

== Ben Webster Foundation ==
After Webster's death, Billy Moore Jr. and the trustee of Webster's estate created the Ben Webster Foundation, a non-profit organization in Denmark.

During the eight years Webster lived in Denmark, he lacked a manager or agent to take care of his artistic rights. In 1972, he joined Billy Moore Jr., arranger for Jimmie Lunceford. Moore clarified Webster's recording history to secure his royalties. Moore started the Ben Webster Foundation with the trustee of Webster's estate. Webster's sole legal heir, Harley Robinson of Los Angeles, gladly assigned his rights to the Foundation.

The Ben Webster Foundation was confirmed by the Queen of Denmark's Seal in 1976. In the Foundation's trust deed, one of the initial paragraphs reads: "to support the dissemination of jazz in Denmark". The trust is a beneficial foundation which channels Webster's annual royalties to musicians in both Denmark and the U.S. An annual Ben Webster Prize is awarded to a young outstanding musician. The prize is not large, but is considered highly prestigious. Over the years, several American musicians have visited Denmark with the help of the Foundation, and concerts, a few recordings, and other jazz-related events have been supported.

The board of the foundation consists of close friends and fans of Webster. Webster's annual royalties are conveyed back to musicians both in Denmark and the U.S. The Ben Webster Prize is awarded annually by vote to one outstanding young musician.

American musicians have visited Denmark to help the foundation by giving concerts. The Board of Trustees monitors Webster's artistic rights and reissues of his music. The foundation concentrates on the legality, quality, and validity of these reissues.

In 2009, Ernie Wilkins's Almost Big Band opened the Copenhagen Jazz Festival with a concert at the Copenhagen Jazzhouse which included the "All Time Battle of Tenor Saxophones" presented by the Webster Foundation.

== Discography ==
=== As leader/co-leader ===
- 1944: The Horn (Circle, 1982)
- 1944–1946: The Chronological (Classics, ?)
- 1946–1951: The Chronological (Classics, ?)
- 1953: Rare Live Performance 1962 (Musidisc, 1975) – radio live in 1953. reissued as 1953: An Exceptional Encounter (The Jazz Factory, 2001).
- 1953: The Consummate Artistry of Ben Webster (Norgran, 1954) – reissued as King of the Tenors (Verve, 1957)
- 1955: Music for Loving (Norgran, 1955)
- 1956: The Art Tatum – Ben Webster Quartet (Verve, 1958) – reissued as The Tatum Group Masterpieces, Volume Eight (Pablo, 1975)
- 1957: Coleman Hawkins Encounters Ben Webster (Verve, 1959)
- 1944–1958: Ben and the Boys (Jazz Archives, 1976) – Newly discovered recs.
- 1958: Soulville (Verve, 1958)
- 1958: The Soul of Ben Webster (Verve, 1959)
- 1959: Ben Webster and Associates (Verve, 1959)
- 1959: Ben Webster Meets Oscar Peterson (Verve, 1960)
- 1959: At the Renaissance – with Jimmy Witherspoon and Gerry Mulligan, (HiFi Jazz, 1960)
- 1959: Gerry Mulligan Meets Ben Webster (Verve, 1960)
- 1960: Ben Webster at the Renaissance (Contemporary, 1985)
- 1961: The Warm Moods (Reprise, 1961)
- 1962: BBB & Co. with Benny Carter and Barney Bigard (Swingville, 1962)
- 1962: Wanted to Do One Together (Columbia, 1962)
- 1963: Soulmates with Joe Zawinul (Riverside, 1963)
- 1963: Carol & Ben with Carol Sloane (Honeydew, 1977)
- 1964: See You at the Fair (Impulse!, 1964)
- 1964: Layin' Back with Ben Vol. 1 (Honeydew, 1977)
- 1964: Layin' Back with Ben Vol. 2 (Honeydew, 1977)
- 1964: Live at Pio's (Enja, 1991) – split album with Gene Ammons
- 1965: Intimate! (Fontana, 1965) – recorded at the Café Montmartre, Copenhagen & reconfigured for Black Lion reissues
- 1965: Saturday Night at the Montmartre (Black Lion, 1974) – reissued on CD in expanded form as Stormy Weather (Black Lion, 1989)
- 1965: Sunday Morning at the Montmartre (Black Lion, 1977) reissued on CD in expanded form as Gone With the Wind (Black Lion, 1989)
- 1965: Ben Webster's First Concert in Denmark (Storyville, 2019)
- 1965: The Jeep Is Jumping (Black Lion, 1990)
- 1965: Blue Light (International Polydor [Germany], 1966) – later re-released as Atmosphere For Lovers and Thieves
- 1965: Big Sound (Polydor, 1969)
- 1965: Atmosphere for Lovers and Thieves (International Polydor , 1966)
- 1967: Previously Unreleased Recordings with Jimmy Witherspoon (Verve, 1974)
- 1967: Big Ben Time! (Fontana, 1967)
- 1967: Swingin' in London with Bill Coleman (Black Lion, 1972)
- 1967: Meets Bill Coleman (Black Lion, 1989)
- 1968: Ben Webster Meets Don Byas (SABA, 1968)
- 1967-1969: Plays Duke Ellington (Storyville, 1988)
- 1969: Live in Amsterdam (Affinity, 1989)
- 1969: Ben Webster at Ease with the Frans Wieringa Trio (Ember, 1969)
- 1969: For the Guv'nor (Columbia, 1969)
- 1970: Ben at His Best (RCA Victor, 1972)
- 1970: Wayfaring Webster (DayBreak, 2000)
- 1970: Webster's Dictionary (Philips, 1970)
- 1969–1971: Ben Webster Plays Ballads (Storyville, 1988)
- 1972: Live at The Haarlemse Jazz Club with Tete Montoliu (Cat, 1972)
- 1972: Ben Webster in Hot House with Tete Montoliu (not on label, 1979)
- 1972: Autumn Leaves with Georges Arvanitas (Futura, 1972)
- 1972: Live in Paris 1972 (France's Concert, 1989)
- 1972: Gentle Ben with Tete Montoliu (Ensayo, 1973) – reissued as Did You Call? (Nessa, 1978)
- 1973: My Man: Live at Montmartre 1973 (Steeplechase, 1973)

=== As sideman ===
With Harry Edison

- Sweets (Clef, 1956)
- Gee Baby, Ain't I Good to You (Verve, 1957)

With Duke Ellington

- 1940–1941: The Great Ellington Units (Bluebird, 1988) – Sessions under the nominal leadership of Barney Bigard and Rex Stewart
- 1940–1942: The Blanton–Webster Band (Bluebird, 1986)
- 1940–1942: Never No Lament: The Blanton-Webster Band (RCA-BMG, 2003)[3CD]

With Johnny Hodges

- The Blues (Norgran, 1955)
- Blues-a-Plenty (Verve, 1958)
- Not So Dukish (Verve, 1958)

With Billie Holiday

- Body and Soul (Verve, 1957)
- Songs for Distingué Lovers (Verve, 1958)
- All or Nothing at All (Verve, 1958)

With Richard "Groove" Holmes

- "Groove" (Pacific Jazz, 1961)
- Tell It Like It Tis (Pacific Jazz, 1966)

With others

- Count Basie, String Along with Basie (Roulette, 1960)
- Buddy Bregman, Swinging Kicks (Verve, 1957)
- Benny Carter, Jazz Giant (Contemporary, 1958)
- Dizzy Gillespie, The Complete RCA Victor Recordings (Bluebird, 1995)
- Lionel Hampton, You Better Know It!!! (Impulse, 1965)
- Coleman Hawkins, Coleman Hawkins and Confrères (Verve, 1958)
- Woody Herman, Songs for Hip Lovers (Verve, 1957)
- Illinois Jacquet, The Kid and the Brute (Clef, 1955)
- Barney Kessel, Let's Cook! (Contemporary, 1962)
- Mundell Lowe, Porgy & Bess (RCA Camden, 1958)
- Les McCann, Les McCann Sings (Pacific Jazz, 1961)
- Carmen McRae, Birds of a Feather (Decca, 1958)
- Jo Stafford, Jo + Jazz (Corinthian, 1960)
- Oliver Nelson, More Blues and the Abstract Truth (Impulse!, 1964)
- Buddy Rich, The Wailing Buddy Rich (Norgran, 1955)
- Kay Starr, I Cry by Night (Capitol, 1962)
- Clark Terry, The Happy Horns of Clark Terry (Impulse!, 1964)
- Joe Williams, At Newport '63 (RCA Victor, 1963)
