= Fiorello! (album) =

Studio album by Oscar Peterson
- Released: 1960
- Recorded: January 1960
- Genre: Jazz
- Length: 32:18
- Label: Verve
- Producer: Norman Granz

Oscar Peterson chronology
Ben Webster Meets Oscar Peterson (1960)	Fiorello! (1960)	The Trio (1961)

Professional ratings
Review scores
Source	Rating
Allmusic	3/5 stars

Fiorello! is a 1960 album by Oscar Peterson, of compositions from the musical Fiorello! by Sheldon Harnick and Jerry Bock.

== Track listing ==
1. "When Did I Fall in Love?" – 4:30
2. "Little Tin Box" – 4:13
3. "Home Again" – 3:01
4. "Till Tomorrow" – 2:40
5. "Politics and Poker" – 4:12
6. "Gentleman Jimmy" – 3:27
7. "Unfair" – 3:53
8. "On the Side of Angels" – 6:33
9. "Where Do I Go from Here?" – 4:23

All songs written by Sheldon Harnick and Jerry Bock.

== Personnel ==
=== Performance ===
- Oscar Peterson - piano
- Ray Brown - double bass
- Ed Thigpen - drums
