= See You at the Fair =

Studio album by Ben Webster
- Released: 1964
- Recorded: March 11 & 25, 1964
- Studio: Van Gelder Studio, Englewood Cliffs, New Jersey
- Genre: Jazz
- Length: 48:57
- Label: Impulse! A-65
- Producer: Bob Thiele

Ben Webster chronology
| Soulmates (1963) | See You at the Fair (1964) | Stormy Weather (1965) |

See You at the Fair is an album by jazz saxophonist Ben Webster, released by Impulse! Records.

== Reception ==
Professional ratings
Review scores
| Source | Rating |
|---|---|
| Allmusic | 5/5 stars |

Allmusic awarded the album 5 stars with its review by Scott Yanow stating "Ben Webster's final American recording was one of his greatest. At 55, the tenor saxophonist was still very much in his prime but considered out of style in the U.S. He would soon permanently move to Europe where he was better appreciated".

== Track listing ==
1. "Someone to Watch Over Me" (Gershwin, Gershwin) 4:30
2. "In a Mellow Tone" (Ellington, Gabler) 4:26
3. "Over the Rainbow" (Arlen, Harburg) 4:42
4. "Love Is Here to Stay"(Gershwin, Gershwin) 2:48
5. "The Single Petal of a Rose" [#] (Ellington) 3:20
6. "See You at the Fair" (Webster) 6:14
7. "Stardust" (Carmichael, Parish) 2:26
8. "Fall of Love" (Tiomkin, Washington) 2:46
9. "While We're Dancing" (Skylar, Vroman) 2:49
10. "Lullaby of Jazzland" (Albam, Ward) 3:04
11. "Midnight Blue" [#] (Hefti) 4:05
12. "Blues for Mr. Broadway" [#] (Brubeck) 8:10

Recorded at Van Gelder Studio, Englewood Cliffs (New Jersey) on March 11 (1–5), March 25 (6–10) and November 10 (11–12), 1964

[#] Not released on original LP but appeared on 1993 reissue (Impulse! Records GRP-11212).

== Personnel ==
1–10:

- Ben Webster: tenor sax
- Hank Jones: piano (1–5)
- Roger Kellaway: piano (6–8), harpsichord (9–10)
- Richard Davis: bass
- Osie Johnson: drums

11–12:

- Oliver Nelson: arranger, conductor, leader
- Thad Jones: trumpet
- Ben Webster: tenor sax
- Phil Bodner: tenor sax, English horn
- Phil Woods: tenor sax
- Pepper Adams: baritone sax
- Roger Kellaway: piano
- Richard Davis: bass
- Grady Tate: drums

== Cover ==
The cover photo shows Ben Webster in front of the Unisphere sculpture, a spherical stainless steel representation of the Earth in Flushing Meadows–Corona Park in the New York City borough of Queens, designed for the 1964 New York World's Fair, the same year the record came out.

== Charts ==
Chart performance for See You at the Fair
| Chart (2025) | Peak position |
|---|---|
| Greek Albums (IFPI) | 34 |
