= BBB & Co. =

Studio album by Benny Carter, Ben Webster and Barney Bigard
- Released: 1962
- Recorded: April 10, 1962
- Studio: Van Gelder, Englewood Cliffs, NJ
- Genre: Jazz
- Length: 34:39
- Label: Swingville; SVLP 2032
- Producer: Leonard Feather

Benny Carter chronology
Further Definitions (1961)	BBB & Co. (1962)	Benny Carter in Paris (1963)

Ben Webster chronology
The Warm Moods (1961)	BBB & Co. (1962)	Wanted to Do One Together (1962)

BBB & Co. (subtitled Benny, Ben & Barney) is an album by swing musicians Benny Carter, Ben Webster and Barney Bigard, recorded in 1962 and originally released by the Swingville label.

== Reception ==
Professional ratings
Review scores
Source	Rating
AllMusic	4/5 stars
The Penguin Guide to Jazz	3/4 stars

AllMusic awarded the album 4 stars and the review by Scott Yanow stated, "All of the swing all-stars are in fine form, making one wish that they were not being so neglected by critics and fans alike during this era; Webster soon left the U.S. permanently for Europe. Although not essential, this set is fun". On NPR Murray Horwitz said that "throughout this deceptively simple album... you hear all that musicality in Benny Carter, plus a big dollop of playfulness. It's a wonderfully enjoyable CD."

== Track listing ==
1. "Opening Blues" (Leonard Feather) – 10:10
2. "Lula" (Benny Carter) – 7:42
3. "When Lights Are Low" (Carter, Spencer Williams) – 4:42
4. "You Can't Tell the Difference When the Sun Goes Down Blues" (Feather) – 12:05

== Personnel ==
- Benny Carter – alto saxophone, trumpet
- Ben Webster – tenor saxophone
- Barney Bigard – clarinet
- Shorty Sherock – trumpet
- Jimmy Rowles – piano
- Dave Barbour – guitar
- Leroy Vinnegar – bass
- Mel Lewis – drums
