= Henry Adler =

American drummer (1915–2008)

- Born: June 28, 1915; New York City, U.S.
- Died: September 30, 2008 (aged 93) Dunedin, Florida
- Genres: Jazz, swing
- Occupations: Musician, teacher, writer, publisher
- Instruments: Drums, percussion
- Years active: 1930–2008

Henry Adler (June 28, 1915 – September 30, 2008) was an American jazz drummer, teacher, author, and publisher. He taught drummer Buddy Rich how to read music and co-wrote Buddy Rich's Modern Interpretation of Snare Drum Rudiments, published in 1942.

== Early years ==
A native of New York City, Adler grew up in the Coney Island neighborhood of Brooklyn. He bought his first snare drum when he was thirteen and learned to play it without formal instruction. Two years later, he got a job playing at a hotel in Belmar, New Jersey. He began lessons with a professional pit drummer from the Palace Theater and studied timpani in high school orchestra at Abraham Lincoln High School and graduated in 1933.

Adler played with bandleaders Wingy Manone, Red Norvo, Charlie Barnet, Louis Prima, Larry Clinton and others.

== Meeting Rich and career ==
One of Adler's former students introduced Adler to Buddy Rich. "The kid told me he played better than Krupa. Buddy was only in his teens at the time and his friend was my first pupil. Buddy played and I watched his hands. Well, he knocked me right out. He did everything I wanted to do, and he did it with such ease. When I met his folks, I asked them who his teacher was. 'He never studied', they told me. That made me feel very good. I realized that it was something physical, not only mental, that you had to have."

In a 1985 interview, Adler clarified the extent of his relationship with Rich and their collaboration on the instructional book. "Sure, Buddy studied with me, but he didn't come to me to learn how to hold the drumsticks. I set out to teach Buddy to read. He'd take six lessons, go on the road for six weeks and come back. He didn't practice. He couldn't, because wherever the guy went, he was followed around by admiring drummers. He didn't have time to practice. Tommy Dorsey wanted Buddy to write a book and he told him to get in touch with me. I did the book and Tommy wrote the foreword. Technically, I was Buddy's teacher, but I came along after he had already acquired his technique."

Adler and Rich wrote Buddy Rich's Modern Interpretation of Snare Drum Rudiments (1942), which became a standard text for drummers. After the book was published, Adler opened a musical instrument store and studio space, for teaching, on West 46th Street in New York City. His students included Louie Bellson, Roy Burns, Sandy Feldstein, Sonny Igoe, Alvin Stoller, and Dave Tough.

He developed the Adler Technique after studying the movements of the arm, hand, and wrist. His technique intended to omit wasted motion. It concentrated on sight reading, mind body coordination, dexterity of right and left hands, and the study of diverse musical genres.

Adler founded a music publishing company in the late 1940s, Henry Adler Inc., and another company, in the 1970s, known as Award Music Company. Some of Adler's publications include How to Play Latin American Rhythm Instruments, Hand Development Techniques, and 4-Way Coordination: A Method Book for the Development of Complete Independence on the Drum Set. He also published numerous instructional books by other prominent musicians - not limited to percussionists.

He had a small role in the movie Desperately Seeking Susan in 1985, playing the drums.

Adler revised Buddy Rich's Modern Interpretation of Snare Drum Rudiments in the 1990s with Ted MacKenzie and it was published in 2005.

== Awards and honors ==
- Hall of Fame induction, Percussive Arts Society, 1988

== Discography ==
=== As sideman ===
- The Uncollected Larry Clinton & His Orchestra 1937–38, Larry Clinton (Hindsight, 1977)
- Jump Georgie Jump, Georgie Auld (Hep, 1993)
