= Ben Webster at the Renaissance =

Live album by Ben Webster
- Released: 1985
- Recorded: October 14, 1960; The Renaissance, Hollywood, California
- Genre: Jazz
- Length: 45:03
- Label: Contemporary; C-7646
- Producer: Lester Koenig

Ben Webster chronology
Ben Webster Meets Oscar Peterson (1958)	Ben Webster at the Renaissance (1985)	The Warm Moods (1960)

Ben Webster at the Renaissance is a live album by American jazz saxophonist Ben Webster featuring tracks recorded in California in 1960 and released on the Contemporary label.

== Reception ==
Professional ratings
Review scores
Source	Rating
Allmusic	4/5 stars
The Penguin Guide to Jazz Recordings	3/4 stars

Allmusic awarded the album 4 stars with its review by Sott Yanow stating "the music is consistently wonderful... Webster (who was then somewhat taken for granted) is in superior and creative form. Recommended".

== Track listing ==
1. "Gone with the Wind" (Allie Wrubel, Herb Magidson) - 8:59 Bonus track on CD release
2. "Stardust" (Hoagy Carmichael, Mitchell Parish) - 10:59
3. "Caravan" (Juan Tizol) - 10:01
4. "Georgia on My Mind" (Hoagy Carmichael, Stuart Gorrell) - 6:37
5. "Ole Miss Blues" (W. C. Handy) - 6:42
6. "Mop Mop" (J. C. Heard, Teddy Wilson) - 8:06 Bonus track on CD release
7. "What Is This Thing Called Love?" (Cole Porter) - 7:35 Bonus track on CD release
8. "Renaissance Blues" (Ben Webster, Frank Butler, Jim Hall, Jimmy Rowles, Red Mitchell) - 5:48 Bonus track on CD release

== Personnel ==
- Ben Webster - tenor saxophone
- Jim Hall - guitar
- Jimmy Rowles - piano
- Red Mitchell - bass
- Frank Butler - drums
