= The Warm Moods =

Studio album by Ben Webster
- Released: February 1961
- Recorded: 1961
- Genre: Jazz
- Length: 35:20
- Label: Reprise; F/FS 2001

Ben Webster chronology
Ben Webster at the Renaissance (1960)	The Warm Moods (1961)	BBB & Co. (1962)

The Warm Moods is an album by American jazz saxophonist Ben Webster featuring tracks recorded in 1961 for the Reprise label. The album was the label's first non-Frank Sinatra release.

== Reception ==
Professional ratings
Review scores
Source	Rating
Allmusic	3/5 stars
Los Angeles Times	5/5 stars
The Rolling Stone Jazz Record Guide	4/5 stars
The Penguin Guide to Jazz Recordings	3.5/4 stars

In the Los Angeles Times, Leonard Feather wrote The Warm Moods demonstrated why Webster was "among the immortals", commenting that his tenor saxophone playing "makes every song seem beautiful, whether the task is easy (as in 'Nancy,' 'There's No You,' 'But Beautiful,' 'It Was So Beautiful') or near impossible (as in 'The Sweetheart of Sigma Chi' and 'The Whiffenpoof Song')." Scott Yanow wrote in his review for AllMusic: "even when simply stating the melody, Webster brings out unexpected beauty in the songs. His tone has never been accurately duplicated".

== Track listing ==
1. "The Sweetheart of Sigma Chi" (Bryan Stokes, Dudley Vernor) - 2:23
2. "Stella by Starlight" (Ned Washington, Victor Young) - 2:59
3. "With Every Breath I Take" (Ralph Rainger, Leo Robin) - 3:02
4. "Accent on Youth" (Vee Lawnhurst, Tot Seymour) - 2:57
5. "But Beautiful" (Johnny Burke, Jimmy Van Heusen) - 2:50
6. "Time After Time" (Sammy Cahn, Jule Styne) - 3:08
7. "Nancy (With the Laughing Face)" (Van Heusen, Phil Silvers) - 3:09
8. "I'm Beginning to See the Light" (Duke Ellington, Don George, Johnny Hodges, Harry James) - 2:44
9. "It Was So Beautiful" (Harry Barris, Arthur Freed) - 3:21
10. "The Whiffenpoof Song" (Tod Galloway, Meade Minnigerode, George S. Pomeroy) - 2:23
11. "It's Easy to Remember" (Lorenz Hart, Richard Rodgers) - 3:08
12. "There's No You" (Tom Adair, Hal Hopper) - 3:16

== Personnel ==
- Ben Webster - tenor saxophone
- Donn Trenner - piano
- Alfred Lustgarten, Lisa Minghetti - violin
- Cecil Figelski - viola
- Armond Kaproff - cello
- Don Bagley - bass
- Frank Capp - drums
