= A Timeless Place =

Studio album by Jeri Brown
- Released: 1995
- Recorded: May 1994
- Genre: Jazz
- Length: 55:51
- Label: Justin Time
- Producer: Jim West

Jeri Brown chronology
"Unfolding" The Peacocks (1993)	A Timeless Place (1995)	Fresh Start (1996)

A Timeless Place is an album by the musician Jeri Brown, released in 1995. The album was nominated for a Juno Award for "Best Mainstream Jazz Album".

== Production ==
The album was produced by Jim West. Brown was accompanied by Jimmy Rowles on piano and Eric Von Essen on bass; Rowles also sang on "Baby, Don't Quit Now". The album was recorded in Hollywood in May 1994. A classically trained vocalist, Brown decided to sing in a more natural style on A Timeless Place. "Morning Star" was cowritten by Rowles and Johnny Mercer.

== Critical reception ==
Professional ratings
Review scores
Source	Rating
AllMusic	4.5/5 stars
Calgary Herald	C
The Encyclopedia of Popular Music	4/5 stars
MusicHound Jazz: The Essential Album Guide	4.5/5 stars
The Penguin Guide to Jazz on CD	4/4 stars

Tucson Weekly wrote that "the lyrics are clever, the melodies oddly shaped, the changes sophisticated, and the ambiance more than suggests that stereotypical late night jazz/lounge hang." The Toronto Star stated that "Brown opts for the craft and laid-back intimacy of phrasing exemplified by Cleo Laine and Billie Holiday."

The Calgary Herald determined that "Brown sounds more like a cabaret performer than a jazz vocalist with her straight-arrow ballad renditions, while Rowles furnishes nothing more than barely-adequate accompaniments." The Omaha World-Herald panned the "overdramatic Lena Horne route."

AllMusic wrote that "Brown gives great emphasis and feeling to the often sensuous (and occasionally witty) lyrics."

== Track listing ==
No.	Title	Length
1.	"Morning Star"
2.	"After School"
3.	"Baby, Don't Quit Now"
4.	"A Timeless Place"
5.	"Old Orleans"
6.	"Music's the Only Thing That's on My Mind"
7.	"Fraser"
8.	"My Mother's Love"
9.	"Looking Back"
