= Sweets (album) =

Studio album by Harry Edison and His Orchestra
- Released: 1956
- Recorded: September 4, 1956
- Studio: Los Angeles, CA
- Genre: Jazz
- Length: 45:44
- Label: Clef; MGC 717
- Producer: Norman Granz

Harry Edison chronology
Pres and Sweets (1955)	Sweets (1956)	Gee, Baby Ain't I Good to You (1957)

Sweets is an album by American jazz trumpeter Harry Edison and His Orchestra recorded in 1956 and originally released on the Clef label.

== Reception ==
Professional ratings
Review scores
Source	Rating
AllMusic	4.5/5 stars
The Penguin Guide to Jazz Recordings	3/4 stars

Allmusic awarded the album 4½ stars stating, "Sweets is one of the quintessential Edison albums showcasing the former Count Basie bandmember at the height of his abilities with a stellar ensemble of other Basie-ites".

== Track listing ==
All compositions by Harry Edison except as indicated

1. "Hollering at the Watkins" - 3:37
2. "Used to Be Basie" - 6:01
3. "How Deep Is the Ocean?" (Irving Berlin) - 3:47
4. "Studio Call" - 8:11
5. "Willow Weep for Me" (Ann Ronell) - 4:49
6. "Opus 711" - 5:08
7. Love Is Here to Stay" (George Gershwin, Ira Gershwin) - 3:23
8. "K.M. Blues" - 3:35
9. "Walkin' with Sweets" - 7:13

== Personnel ==
- Harry Edison - trumpet
- Ben Webster - tenor saxophone
- Jimmy Rowles - piano
- Barney Kessel - guitar
- Joe Mondragon - bass
- Alvin Stoller - drums
