= Gee Baby, Ain't I Good to You (album) =

Studio album by Harry Edison
- Released: 1958
- Recorded: March 5 & 30, 1957
- Studio: Los Angeles, CA
- Genre: Jazz
- Length: 41:42
- Label: Verve; MG V-8211
- Producer: Norman Granz

Harry Edison chronology
Sweets (1956)	Gee Baby, Ain't I Good to You (1958)	Jazz Giants '58 (1957)

Gee Baby, Ain't I Good to You is an album by trumpeter Harry "Sweets" Edison which was recorded in 1957 and released on the Verve label.

Professional ratings
Review scores
Source	Rating
Allmusic	4/5 stars

== Track listing ==
All compositions by Harry Edison except where noted.

1. "Blues for Piney Brown" – 7:33
2. "Blues for the Blues" – 4:48
3. "Blues for Bill Basie" – 9:27
4. "Gee, Baby, Ain't I Good to You" (Don Redman, Andy Razaf) – 3:28
5. "You're Getting to Be a Habit with Me" (Al Dubin, Harry Warren) – 6:49
6. "Taste on the Place" – 6:55
7. "Moonlight in Vermont" (Karl Suessdorf, John Blackburn) – 3:52

== Personnel ==
- Harry Edison – trumpet
- Ben Webster – tenor saxophone
- Oscar Peterson – piano
- Herb Ellis (tracks 3, 6 & 7), Barney Kessel (tracks 1, 2, 4 & 5) – guitar
- Ray Brown – bass
- Alvin Stoller – drums
