= Jeri Brown =

American singer

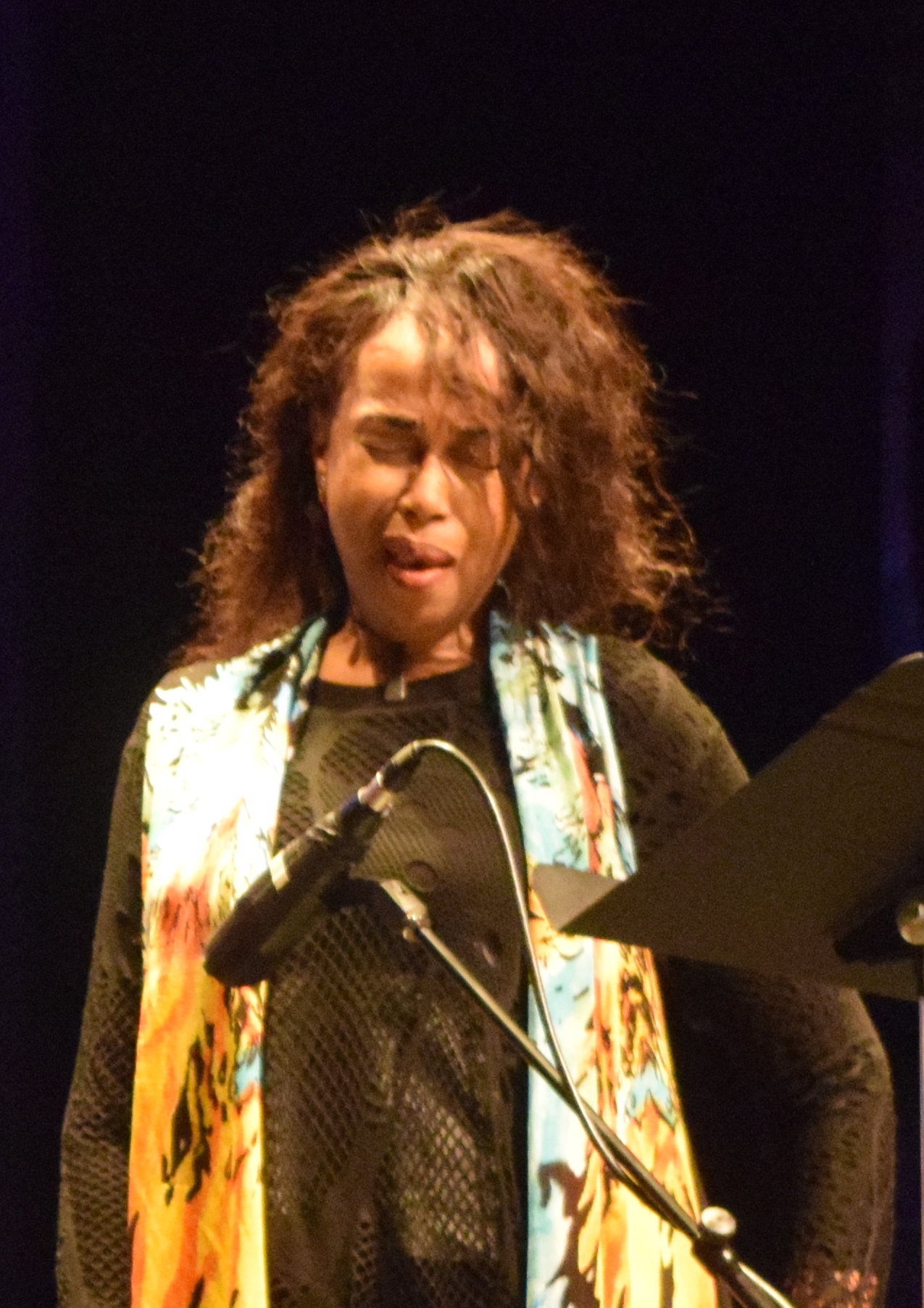
- Jeri Brown performing in 2014

Background information
- Born: March 20, 1952 (age 74); St. Louis, Missouri, U.S.
- Genres: Jazz
- Occupation: Musician
- Years active: 1990–present
- Label: Justin Time
- Website: jeribrown.com

Jeri Brown (born 1952 in Missouri) is an American jazz singer, songwriter, and professor.

== Life and work ==
Jeri Brown grew up in St. Louis, where she first appeared in public at age six. In Iowa, she studied classical singing, and later appeared in the Midwestern United States and Europe. After graduating, she lived in Cleveland, where she worked with the Cleveland Chamber Orchestra and the St. Louis Symphony Orchestra. She performed in Ohio with the band of drummer and bandleader Bob McKee. As a consequence, she had collaborations with artists such as Ellis Marsalis, Billy Taylor and Dizzy Gillespie.

Jeri Brown then worked mainly in the jazz scene of the Cleveland area, focused on jazz standard material, wrote lyrics and collaborated with composers such as Henry Butler, Kenny Wheeler, Greg Carter and Cyrus Chestnut. In 1991, Brown signed with the Canadian Justin Time label. She has been under contract with this label since her debut album Mirage, where she was accompanied by pianist Fred Hersch and bassist Daniel Lessard. In 1992 she recorded Unfolding The Peacocks with Kirk Lightsey and Peter Leitch. This album contained the bebop standard "If You Could See Me Now" and "Woody N' You". In 1998, she worked on the album Zaius with David Murray, Don Braden, John Hicks, Curtis Lundy and Avery Sharpe. She sang standards like "Softly, as in a Morning Sunrise" and "You Must Believe in Spring". At the end of the same year they produced with the same band and Leon Thomas I've Got Your Number.

Brown taught at the Oberlin Conservatory of Music, Cleveland State University and the University of Akron in Ohio. Brown has also worked at the University of Massachusetts Amherst.

Brown moved to Canada in 1989, and in the 1990s she taught jazz history, improvisation and vocal technique at Concordia University in Montreal, Quebec. She also taught at McGill University in Montreal, and served as artist-in-residence at St. Francis Xavier University in Nova Scotia.

Jeri Brown is a recipient of the Martin Luther King Jr. Achievement Award.

== Discography ==
- Mirage with Fred Hersch (Justin Time, 1991)
- Unfolding the Peacocks (Justin Time, 1993)
- A Timeless Place with Jimmy Rowles (Justin Time, 1995)
- Fresh Start (Justin Time, 1996)
- April in Paris (Justin Time, 1996)
- Zaius (Justin Time, 1998)
- I've Got Your Number (Justin Time, 1999)
- The Image in the Mirror: The Triptych (Justin Time, 2001)
- Firm Roots (Justin Time, 2003)
- Sempre Nina: A Tribute to Nina Simone (Jongleur, 2005)
- Storytelling (Jongleur, 2011)
- Echoes: Live at Catalina Jazz Club (Jongleur, 2013)
- Soul Shower (2014)
