= If I'm Lucky (album) =

Studio album by Zoot Sims and Jimmy Rowles
- Released: 1977
- Recorded: October 27 & 28, 1977
- Studio: RCA, NYC
- Genre: Jazz
- Length: 45:11
- Label: Pablo; 2310-803
- Producer: Norman Granz

Zoot Sims chronology
Hawthorne Nights (1976)	If I'm Lucky (1977)	For Lady Day (1978)

Jimmy Rowles chronology
Music's the Only Thing on My Mind (1976)	If I'm Lucky (1977)	As Good as It Gets (1978)

If I'm Lucky is an album by saxophonist Zoot Sims with pianist Jimmy Rowles, recorded in 1977 for the Pablo label.

== Reception ==
Professional ratings
Review scores
Source	Rating
AllMusic	4/5 stars
The Penguin Guide to Jazz	4/4 stars

AllMusic awarded the album 4 stars, and its review by Scott Yanow calls it an "enjoyable straight-ahead date". On All About Jazz, Marc Barnett described the album as "gorgeous improvisations on some beautiful yet rarely played songs". The Penguin Guide to Jazz selected this album as part of its suggested Core Collection.

== Track listing ==
1. "(I Wonder) Where Our Love Has Gone" (Buddy Johnson) - 4:54
2. "Legs" (Neal Hefti) - 6:31
3. "If I'm Lucky" (Eddie DeLange, Josef Myrow) - 5:29
4. "Shadow Waltz" (Harry Warren, Al Dubin) - 5:34
5. "You're My Everything" (Warren, Mort Dixon, Joe Young) - 5:26
6. "It's All Right with Me" (Cole Porter) - 6:54
7. "Gypsy Sweetheart" (Mitchell Parish) - 4:18
8. "I Hear a Rhapsody" (Jack Baker, George Fragos, Dick Gasparre) - 6:28

== Personnel ==
- Zoot Sims - tenor saxophone
- Jimmy Rowles - piano
- George Mraz - bass
- Mousey Alexander - drums
