= Alvin Stoller =

American drummer (1925–1992)

Background information
- Born: October 7, 1925; New York City, New York, U.S.
- Died: October 19, 1992 (aged 67) Los Angeles, California, U.S.
- Genres: Jazz
- Occupation: Musician
- Instrument: Drums

Alvin Stoller (October 7, 1925 – October 19, 1992) was an American jazz drummer. He was best known for playing drums on both Mitch Miller's recording of "The Yellow Rose of Texas" and Stan Freberg's parody of Miller's recording.

== Career ==
Born in New York City, Stoller studied with drum teacher Henry Adler and launched his career touring and recording with swing era big bands led by Benny Goodman, Tommy Dorsey, Harry James, and Charlie Barnet. He backed singers including Billie Holiday, Mel Tormé, and Frank Sinatra on some of their major recordings. His drums may be heard on many of Ella Fitzgerald's "Songbook" recordings; on Ella Fitzgerald Sings the Duke Ellington Songbook, he performed with the Duke Ellington orchestra itself, alongside Ellington's own Sam Woodyard. From the moment Frank Sinatra started to record with Capitol Records in 1953, Stoller was the singer's preferred percussionist and performed on nearly all Sinatra recordings until 1958, including albums such as "In the Wee Small Hours", Songs for Swingin' Lovers!, and "Come Fly With Me", among others.

Stoller also recorded with Art Tatum, Roy Eldridge, Oscar Peterson, Coleman Hawkins, Ben Webster (see Coleman Hawkins Encounters Ben Webster), Benny Carter, Herb Ellis, and Erroll Garner among many other jazz musicians. In the 1950s, Stoller settled in the Los Angeles area, where he became respected for his work in the Hollywood studios, lasting for several decades. Leonard Feather considered him a "first-rate, swinging drummer". That Buddy Rich, whom some consider to have been the greatest of all jazz drummers, chose Stoller to play drums on an album in which Rich himself sang suggests the esteem Stoller earned from his fellow musicians.

Stoller played snare drum and received label credit for "Yankee snare drumming", on Stan Freberg's version of Mitch Miller's "Yellow Rose of Texas", in which his loud playing interrupts the singer, Freberg. Stoller had played the prominent snare on the original Mitch Miller recording.

== Personal life ==
On September 23, 1951, Stoller married Mary Hatcher, an American singer and actress, in Westwood, California.

== Discography ==
=== As leader ===
- The Art Tatum-Roy Eldridge-Alvin Stoller-John Simmons Quartet (Clef, 1955)
- The Moon Is Low with Art Tatum, Roy Eldridge, John Simmons (Clef, 1956)

=== As sideman ===
With Ray Anthony

- Jam Session at the Tower (Capitol, 1956)
- Ray Anthony Plays Steve Allen (Capitol, 1958)
- Sound Spectacular (Capitol, 1959)

With The Coasters

- Searchin' (Atco, 1957)
- Young Blood (Atco, 1957)

With Harry Edison

- Sweets (Clef, 1956)
- Gee Baby, Ain't I Good to You (Verve, 1957)
- The Inventive Mr. Edison (Pacific Jazz, 1960)

With Coleman Hawkins

- Coleman Hawkins Encounters Ben Webster (Verve, 1959)
- The Genius of Coleman Hawkins (Verve, 1959)
- Coleman Hawkins and Confrères (Verve, 1960)

With Billie Holiday

- Solitude (Clef, 1956)
- Body and Soul (Verve, 1957)
- All or Nothing at All (Verve, 1958)
- Songs for Distingue Lovers (Columbia, 1959)

With others

- Laurindo Almeida, Happy Cha-Cha-Cha! (Capitol, 1959)
- Marvin Ash, New Orleans at Midnight (Brunswick, 1957)
- Fred Astaire, Mr. Top Hat (Verve, 1956)
- George Auld, In the Land of Hi-Fi with Georgie Auld and His Orchestra (EmArcy/Mercury, 1956)
- Brothers Candoli, The Brothers Candoli (Dot, 1957)
- Ray Brown, Bass Hit! (Verve, 1957)
- Rusty Bryant, Jazz Horizons: Rusty Bryant Plays Jazz (Dot, 1958)
- Benny Carter, Additions to Further Definitions (Impulse!, 1966)
- Dick Cathcart, BIX MCMLIX (Warner Bros., 1959)
- Page Cavanaugh, The Girl (Vaya 1956)
- Bing Crosby, Bing Sings Whilst Bregman Swings (Verve, 1956)
- Buddy DeFranco, Buddy De Franco Plays Artie Shaw (Verve, 1958)
- Buddy DeFranco, Generalissimo (Verve, 1958)
- Matt Dennis, Dennis, Anyone? (RCA Victor, 1955)
- Matt Dennis & Red Norvo, Some of My Favorites (RCA, 1957)
- Roy Eldridge & Benny Carter, The Urbane Jazz of Roy Eldridge and Benny Carter (Verve, 1957)
- Herb Ellis, Ellis in Wonderland (Norgran, 1956)
- Dennis Farnon, Caution! Men Swinging (RCA Victor, 1957)
- Maynard Ferguson, Around the Horn with Maynard Ferguson (EmArcy, 1956)
- Ella Fitzgerald, Ella and Louis at the Hollywood Bowl (Karusell, 1958)
- Ella Fitzgerald, Ella Fitzgerald Sings the Jerome Kern Song Book (Verve, 1963)
- Erroll Garner, All of Me (Savoy, 1963)
- Helen Grayco, After Midnight (Vik, 1957)
- Toni Harper, Toni (Verve, 1956)
- The Hi-Lo's & Marty Paich, And All That Jazz (Columbia, 1958)
- Peggy Lee, Mirrors (A&M, 1975)
- Joseph J. Lilley, Alone Together (Decca, 1955)
- Nellie Lutcher, Our New Nellie (Liberty, 1956)
- Henry Mancini, More Music from Peter Gunn (RCA Victor, 1959)
- Billy May, Sorta May (Capitol, 1955)
- Billy May, Big Fat Brass (Capitol, 1958)
- Murray McEachern, Music for Sleepwalkers Only (Key, 1956)
- Hugo Montenegro, Process 70 (Time, 1962)
- Audrey Morris, The Voice of Audrey Morris (Bethlehem, 1956)
- Rose Murphy, Not Cha-Cha But Chi-Chi (Verve, 1957)
- Ted Nash, Peter Gunn (Crown, 1959)
- Anita O'Day, Anita (Verve, 1956)
- Patti Page, The West Side (Mercury, 1958)
- Oscar Peterson, Oscar Peterson Quartet #1 (Clef, 1956)
- Buddy Rich, Buddy Rich Just Sings (Verve, 1957)
- Mavis Rivers, Swing Along with Mavis (Reprise, 1961)
- Howard Roberts, Mr. Roberts Plays Guitar (Verve, 1957)
- Pete Rugolo, Ten Trumpets and 2 Guitars (Mercury, 1961)
- Hal Schaefer, Just Too Much (RCA Victor, 1955)
- Paul Smith, By the Fireside (Savoy, 1956)
- Stuff Smith, Stuff Smith (Verve, 1957)
- Joanie Sommers, For Those Who Think Young (Warner Bros., 1962)
- Mel Torme, Mel Torme Sings Fred Astaire (Bethlehem, 1956)
- Ben Webster, The Consummate Artistry of Ben Webster (Norgran, 1954)
- Kitty White, Sweet Talk (Roulette, 1958)
- Stanley Wilson, The Music from M Squad (RCA Victor, 1959)
- Si Zentner, High Noon Cha Cha Cha (Bel Canto, 1959)
