= Ray Brown discography =

Discography for jazz double-bassist and cellist Ray Brown.

== Discography ==
=== As leader/co-leader ===
- New Sounds in Modern Music (Savoy, 1946)
- Bass Hit! (Verve, 1957) – rec. 1956
- This Is Ray Brown (Polygram, 1958)
- Jazz Cello (Verve, 1960)
- Ray Brown with the All-Star Big Band (Verve, 1962)
- Much in Common with Milt Jackson (Verve, 1964)
- Ray Brown / Milt Jackson (Verve, 1965)
- This One's for Blanton! with Duke Ellington (Pablo, 1973) – rec. 1972
- The Big 3 with Milt Jackson and Joe Pass (Pablo, 1975)
- Brown's Bag (Concord Jazz, 1976)
- Herb Ellis and the Ray Brown Sextet, Hot Tracks (Concord Jazz, 1976)
- Jones-Brown-Smith with Hank Jones and Jimmie Smith (Concord Jazz, 1976)
- As Good as It Gets (Concord Jazz, 1977)
- Quadrant with Milt Jackson, Mickey Roker, Joe Pass (Original Jazz Classics, 1977)
- Rockin' in Rhythm with Hank Jones, Jimmie Smith (Concord Jazz, 1977)
- Something for Lester (Contemporary, 1978) – rec. 1977
- Tasty! with Jimmy Rowles (Concord Jazz, 1979)
- Live at the Concord Jazz Festival (Concord Jazz, 1979) – live
- All Too Soon: The Duke Ellington Album with Milt Jackson, Mickey Roker, Joe Pass (Pablo, 1980)
- Echoes from West (Atlas, 1981)
- The Ray Brown 3 (Concord Jazz, 1982)
- Milt Jackson Ray Brown Jam (Pablo, 1982)
- Jackson, Johnson, Brown & Company (Original Jazz Classics, 1983)
- Trio with Judy Roberts, Jeff Hamilton (Pausa Records, 1983)
- Soular Energy (Concord Jazz, 1984)
- Overseas Special with Monty Alexander, Herb Ellis (Concord Jazz, 1984) – rec. 1982
- One O'Clock Jump (Verve, 1984)
- Bye Bye Blackbird (Paddle Wheel, 1985)
- Don't Forget the Blues - They Ray Brown All Stars (Concord Jazz, 1985)
- The Red Hot Ray Brown Trio (Concord Jazz, 1987) – rec. 1985
- Breakin' Out with George Shearing, Marvin Smith (Concord Jazz, 1987)
- Bam Bam Bam (Concord Jazz, 1989)
- Georgia on My Mind (LOB, 1989)
- Listen Here! with Gene Harris Quartet (Concord Jazz, 1989)
- After Hours (Telarc, 1989)
- Uptown (Telarc, 1990)
- Moore Makes 4 with Ralph Moore (Concord Jazz, 1990)
- Summer Wind: Live at the Loa (Concord Jazz, 1990) – live
- New Two Bass Hits (Capri, 1991)
- 3 Dimensional: The Ray Brown Trio (Concord Jazz, 1991)
- Old Friends (Telarc, 1992)
- Kiri Sidetracks: The Jazz Album (Polygram, 1992)
- Bassface: The Ray Brown Trio - Live At Kuumbwa Jazz Center (Santa Cruz, California) (Telarc, 1993)
- Black Orpheus: Ray brown Trio (Evidence, 1994)
- Don't Get Sassy (Telarc, 1994)
- Some of My Best Friends Are...The Piano Players (Telarc, 1994)
- Seven Steps to Heaven (Telarc, 1995)
- Introducing Kristin Korb with the Ray Brown Trio (Telarc, 1996)
- Some of My Best Friends Are...The Sax Players (Telarc, 1996)
- Live at Scullers (Telarc, 1996) – live in Scullers Jazz Club, Boston, Massachusetts
- SuperBass (Telarc, 1997)
- Some of My Best Friends Are...Singers (Telarc, 1998)
- Triple Play (Telarc, 1998)
- Summertime (Ray Brown Trio, Ulf Wakenius) (Telarc, 1998)
- Moonlight in Vermont (Prevue, 1998)
- Christmas Songs with The Ray Brown Trio (Telarc, 1999)
- Some of My Best Friends Are... The Trumpet Players (Telarc, 2000)
- Blues for Jazzo (Prevue, 2000)
- The Duo Sessions with Jimmy Rowles (Concord Jazz, 2000)
- Live at Starbucks (Telarc, 2001) – live
- SuperBass 2 (Telarc, 2001)
- Herb Ellis/Ray Brown Sextet, In the Pocket (Concord Jazz, 2002)
- Some of My Best Friends Are ... Guitarists (Telarc, 2002)
- Triple Scoop (Concord Jazz, 2002)
- Ray Brown Monty Alexander Russell Malone (Telarc, 2002)[2CD]
- Straight Ahead with Monty Alexander, Herb Ellis (Concord Jazz, 2003)
- Walk On (Telarc, 2003)
- As Good as It Gets (Concord Jazz, 2000)
- Live from New York to Tokyo (Concord Jazz, 2003) – live

Compilation

- Bassics: Best of Ray Brown Trio 1977-2000 (Concord Jazz, 2006) – remastered

=== As sideman ===
With Benny Carter

- Benny Carter Plays Pretty (Norgran, 1954)
- New Jazz Sounds (Norgran, 1954)
- Alone Together (Norgran, 1955) – rec. 1952
- Cosmopolite (Norgran, 1955) – rec. 1952
- Elegy in Blue (MusicMasters, 1994)

With Blossom Dearie

- Blossom Dearie (Verve, 1957)
- Give Him the Ooh-La-La (Verve, 1957)
- Once Upon a Summertime (Verve, 1958)
- Blossom Dearie Sings Comden and Green (Verve, 1959)
- My Gentleman Friend (Verve, 1959)

With Roy Eldridge

- Rockin' Chair (Clef, 1953)
- Dale's Wail (Clef, 1953)
- Little Jazz (Clef, 1954)

With José Feliciano

- Feliciano! (RCA Victor, 1968)
- Souled (RCA Victor, 1968)
- Feliciano/10 to 23 (RCA Victor, 1969)

With Ella Fitzgerald and Louis Armstrong

- Ella and Louis (Verve, 1956)
- Ella and Louis Again (Verve, 1957)

With Dizzy Gillespie

- The Complete RCA Victor Recordings (Bluebird, 1995) – rec. 1937–1949
- Diz and Getz (Norgran, 1953)
- Roy and Diz (Clef, 1954)
- For Musicians Only (Verve, 1956)
- Dizzy Gillespie's Big 4 (Pablo, 1974)
- Dizzy Gillespie Jam (Pablo, 1977)

With The Gene Harris All Star Big Band

- Tribute to Count Basie (Concord Jazz, 1988)

With Coleman Hawkins

- Coleman Hawkins and Confrères (Verve, 1958)
- The High and Mighty Hawk (Felsted, 1958)

With Milt Jackson

- That's the Way It Is (Impulse!, 1970) – rec. 1969
- Just the Way It Had to Be (Impulse!, 1970) – rec. 1969
- Memphis Jackson (Impulse!, 1970) – rec. 1969
- Feelings (Pablo, 1976)

With Hank Jones

- Urbanity (Clef, 1956) – rec. 1947–1953
- Just for Fun (Galaxy, 1977)

With Quincy Jones

- In the Heat of the Night OST (United Artists, 1967)
- The Lost Man (soundtrack) (Uni, 1969)
- Walking in Space (A&M, 1969)
- The Hot Rock (soundtrack) (Prophesy, 1972)

With Barney Kessel

- The Poll Winners with Shelly Manne (Contemporary, 1957)
- The Poll Winners Ride Again! (Contemporary, 1958)
- Poll Winners Three! (Contemporary, 1959)
- Exploring the Scene! (Contemporary, 1960)
- Straight Ahead (Contemporary, 1975)
- Soaring (Concord Jazz, 1977)

With Gene Krupa and Buddy Rich

- Krupa and Rich (Verve, 1956)
- The Drum Battle (Verve, 1960) – rec. 1952

With The L.A. Four

- The L.A. Four Scores! (Concord Jazz, 1975)
- The L.A.4 (Concord Jazz, 1976) – also issued as Concierto de Aranjuez
- Pavane pour une infante défunte (Nautilus, 1976)
- Just Friends (Concord Jazz, 1978)
- Watch What Happens (Concord Jazz, 1978)
- Going Home (East Wind, 1978)
- Live at Montreux, 1978 (Concord Jazz, 1978)
- Zaca (Concord Jazz, 1980)
- Montage (Concord Jazz, 1981)
- Executive Suite (Concord Jazz, 1982)

With Howard McGhee

- Howard McGhee and Milt Jackson (Savoy, 1955) – rec. 1948
- Together Again!!!! with Teddy Edwards (Contemporary, 1961)

With James Morrison

- Snappy Doo (East West, 1991)
- Two the Max (East West, 1992)

With Maria Muldaur

- Maria Muldaur (Reprise, 1973)
- Waitress in a Donut Shop (Reprise, 1974)

With Phineas Newborn, Jr.

- Please Send Me Someone to Love (Contemporary, 1969)
- Harlem Blues (Contemporary, 1975) – rec. 1969
- Look Out – Phineas Is Back! (Pablo, 1978) – rec. 1976
- Back Home (Contemporary, 1985) – rec. 1976

With Oscar Peterson

- Lester Young with the Oscar Peterson Trio (Clef, 1952)
- The Astaire Story (Clef, 1952)
- Oscar Peterson Plays Duke Ellington (Clef, 1952)
- Buddy DeFranco and Oscar Peterson Play George Gershwin (Clef, 1954)
- Oscar Peterson Plays Harold Arlen (Clef, 1954)
- Oscar Peterson Plays Count Basie (Clef, 1955)
- Toni (Verve, 1956)
- Ellis in Wonderland (Verve, 1956)
- Oscar Peterson at the Stratford Shakespearean Festival (Verve, 1956)
- Anita Sings the Most (Verve, 1956)
- Soft Sands (Verve, 1957)
- The Oscar Peterson Trio with Sonny Stitt, Roy Eldridge and Jo Jones at Newport (Verve, 1957)
- Jazz Giants '58 (Verve, 1957)
- Stan Getz and the Oscar Peterson Trio (Verve, 1957)
- Only the Blues (Verve, 1957) with Sonny Stitt
- Louis Armstrong Meets Oscar Peterson (Verve, 1957)
- Soulville with Ben Webster (Verve, 1957)
- The Genius of Coleman Hawkins (Verve, 1957)
- Coleman Hawkins Encounters Ben Webster (Verve, 1957)
- Stan Getz and J.J. Johnson at the Opera House (Verve, 1957)
- Oscar Peterson at the Concertgebouw (Verve, 1958)
- Ella in Rome: The Birthday Concert (Verve, 1958)
- On the Town with the Oscar Peterson Trio (Verve, 1958)
- Oscar Peterson Plays "My Fair Lady" (Verve, 1958)
- Sonny Stitt Sits in with the Oscar Peterson Trio (Verve, 1959)
- A Jazz Portrait of Frank Sinatra (Verve, 1959)
- The Jazz Soul of Oscar Peterson (Verve, 1959)
- Oscar Peterson Plays the Duke Ellington Songbook (Verve, 1959)
- Oscar Peterson Plays the George Gershwin Songbook (Verve, 1959)
- Oscar Peterson Plays the Richard Rodgers Songbook (Verve, 1959)
- Oscar Peterson Plays the Jerome Kern Songbook (Verve, 1959)
- Oscar Peterson Plays the Cole Porter Songbook (Verve, 1959)
- Oscar Peterson Plays the Harold Arlen Songbook (Verve, 1959)
- Oscar Peterson Plays Porgy & Bess (Verve, 1959)
- Swinging Brass with the Oscar Peterson Trio (Verve, 1959)
- Ben Webster Meets Oscar Peterson (Verve, 1959)
- Fiorello! (Verve, 1960)
- The Trio (Verve, 1961)
- The Sound of the Trio (Verve, 1961)
- West Side Story (Verve, 1962)
- Bursting Out with the All-Star Big Band! (Verve, 1962)
- Affinity (Verve, 1962)
- Something Warm (Verve, 1962)
- Put On a Happy Face (Verve, 1962)
- Very Tall (Verve, 1962)
- Night Train (Verve, 1962)
- Bill Henderson with the Oscar Peterson Trio (Verve, 1963)
- The Oscar Peterson Trio Plays (Verve, 1964)
- Oscar Peterson Trio + One (Verve, 1964)
- Canadiana Suite (Limelight, 1964)
- We Get Requests (Verve, 1964)
- I/We Had a Ball (Limelight, 1965) - 1 track
- Eloquence (Limelight, 1965)
- With Respect to Nat (Limelight, 1965)
- Blues Etude (Limelight, 1965)
- Action (MPS, 1968)
- Girl Talk (MPS, 1968) – rec. 1965–1968
- Reunion Blues (MPS, 1972) – rec. 1971
- The History of an Artist, Vol. 1 (Pablo, 1972)
- The History of an Artist, Vol. 2 (Pablo, 1972)
- Satch and Josh (Pablo, 1974) with Count Basie
- The Giants (Pablo, 1974)
- The Giants, Oscar Peterson, Joe Pass (Original Jazz Classics, 1974)
- Ella and Oscar (Pablo, 1975)
- Happy Time (Pablo, 1975) with Roy Eldridge
- Oscar Peterson and the Bassists – Montreux '77 (Pablo, 1977)
- Eddie "Lockjaw" Davis 4 – Montreux '77 (Pablo, 1977)
- How Long Has This Been Going On? Sarah Vaughan (Pablo, 1978)
- The Trumpet Summit Meets the Oscar Peterson Big 4 (Pablo, 1980) (Dizzy Gillespie, Freddie Hubbard, Clark Terry)
- The Alternate Blues (Pablo, 1980), Dizzy Gillespie, Freddie Hubbard, Clark Terry
- Ain't But a Few of Us Left (Palbo, 1981) Milt Jackson, Ray Brown, Grady Tate
- Live at the Blue Note (Telarc, 1990)
- Saturday Night at the Blue Note (Telarc, 1990)
- Last Call at the Blue Note (Telarc, 1990)
- Encore at the Blue Note (Telarc, 1990)
- Side by Side (Telarc, 1994)
- The More I See You, Benny Carter, Clark Terry (Telarc, 1995)
- Exclusively for My Friends: The Lost Tapes (MPS, 1995) – rec. 1965–1968
- A Tribute to Oscar Peterson – Live at the Town Hall (Telarc, 1997)
- Oscar and Benny (Telarc, 1998)

With André Previn

- After Hours (Telarc, 1989)
- Uptown (Telarc, 1990)
- Old Friends (Telarc, 1992)
- What Headphones? (Angel, 1993)
- André Previn and Friends Play Show Boat (Deutsche Grammophon, 1995)

With Della Reese

- Della on Strings of Blue (ABC, 1967)
- I Gotta Be Me...This Trip Out (ABC, 1968)

With Linda Ronstadt

- What's New (Asylum, 1983)
- For Sentimental Reasons (Asylum, 1986)

With Lalo Schifrin

- Music from Mission: Impossible (Dot, 1967)
- There's a Whole Lalo Schifrin Goin' On (Dot, 1968)
- More Mission: Impossible (ABC Records, 1968)
- Bullitt (soundtrack) (Warner Bros., 1968)
- Kelly's Heroes (MGM, 1970)
- Jazz Meets the Symphony (Atlantic, 1992)
- More Jazz Meets the Symphony (Atlantic, 1993)
- Firebird: Jazz Meets the Symphony No. 3 (Four Winds, 1995)
- Metamorphosis: Jazz Meets the Symphony#4 (Aleph, 1998)

With Bud Shank

- Bud Shank & the Sax Section (Pacific Jazz, 1966)
- Bud Shank Plays Music from Today's Movies (World Pacific, 1967)
- Windmills of Your Mind (Pacific Jazz, 1969)

With Frank Sinatra

- That's Life (Reprise, 1966)
- Sinatra & Company (Reprise, 1971)
- Ol' Blue Eyes Is Back (Reprise, 1973)
- L.A. Is My Lady (Qwest, 1984)

With The Manhattan Transfer

- Vocalese (Atlantic, 1985)
- Swing (Atlantic, 1997)

With Big Joe Turner

- The Bosses (Pablo, 1974)
- Life Ain't Easy (Pablo, 1983)

With Sarah Vaughan

- Sarah Vaughan with Michel Legrand (Mainstream, 1972)
- How Long Has This Been Going On? (Pablo, 1978)

With Ben Webster

- King of the Tenors (Verve, 1954)
- Music for Loving (Norgran, 1954)
- Coleman Hawkins Encounters Ben Webster (Verve, 1957)
- Ben Webster and Associates (Verve, 1959)

With Joe Williams

- With Love (Temponic, 1972)
- Nothin' but the Blues (Delos, 1983)

With others

- Count Basie, Basie Jazz (Clef, 1954)
- Beaver & Krause, Gandharva (Warner Bros., 1971)
- Louis Bellson, Drummer's Holiday (Verve, 1958)
- Marc Benno, Ambush (A&M, 1972)
- Stephen Bishop, Bish (ABC, 1978)
- Blondie, Autoamerican (Chrysalis, 1980)
- Claude Bolling: Concerto for Classic Guitar and Jazz Piano (Angel, 1980), with George Shearing, Shelly Manne, and Angel Romero
- Dee Dee Bridgewater, Dear Ella (Verve, 1997)
- Till Brönner, Generations of Jazz (Minor Music, 1994)
- James Brown, Soul on Top (King, 1970)
- Ray Charles, A Message from the People (ABC, 1972)
- Natalie Cole, Unforgettable... with Love (Elektra, 1991)
- Priscilla Coolidge, Gypsy Queen (Sussex, 1970)
- Elvis Costello, King of America (F-Beat, 1986)
- Craig Doerge, Craig Doerge (Columbia, 1973)
- Harry Edison, Gee Baby, Ain't I Good to You (Verve, 1957)
- Teddy Edwards, Feelin's (Muse, 1974)
- Duke Ellington, Duke's Big 4 (Pablo, 1973)
- Don Ellis, Haiku (MPS, 1974)
- Art Farmer, On the Road (Contemporary, 1976)
- Maynard Ferguson, Around the Horn with Maynard Ferguson (EmArcy, 1956)
- Ella Fitzgerald, These Are the Blues (Verve, 1963)
- Aretha Franklin, Sweet Passion (Atlantic, 1977)
- Ted Gärdestad, Blue Virgin Isles (Polar, 1978)
- Bobbie Gentry, The Delta Sweete (Capitol, 1968)
- Jimmy Giuffre, The Easy Way (Verve, 1959)
- Johnny Hartman, Unforgettable Songs by Johnny Hartman (ABC, 1966)
- Hampton Hawes, Hampton Hawes at the Piano (Contemporary, 1978)
- Johnny Hodges, The Blues (Norgran, 1955)
- Illinois Jacquet, Swing's the Thing (Clef, 1956)
- Dr. John, Afterglow (Blue Thumb, 1995)
- Elton John, Duets (Rocket, 1993)
- J. J. Johnson, Concepts in Blue (Pablo Today, 1981)
- Diana Krall, Only Trust Your Heart (GRP, 1995)
- Peggy Lee, Mirrors (A&M, 1975)
- Nick Lowe, Party of One (Reprise, 1990)
- Junior Mance, Junior (Verve, 1959)
- Barry Manilow, Manilow Sings Sinatra (Arista, 1998)
- Johnny Mathis, Johnny Mathis (Columbia, 1956)
- Frank Morgan, Love, Lost & Found (Telarc, 1995)
- Gerry Mulligan and Stan Getz, Gerry Mulligan Meets Stan Getz (Verve, 1957)
- Oliver Nelson, Sound Pieces (Impulse!, 1966)
- Charlie Parker, Big Band (Clef, 1954)
- Art Pepper and Zoot Sims, Art 'n' Zoot (Pablo, 1995)
- André Previn and Kiri Te Kanawa, Kiri Sidetracks: The Jazz Album (Polygram, 1992)
- Buddy Rich, The Wailing Buddy Rich (Norgran, 1955)
- Lionel Richie, Lionel Richie (Motown, 1982)
- Red Rodney, Superbop (Muse, 1974)
- Sonny Rollins and Shelly Manne, Way Out West (Contemporary, 1957)
- Rosebud, Rosebud (Reprise, 1971)
- Richard Roundtree, The Man from Shaft (MGM, 1972)
- Steely Dan, Countdown to Ecstasy (ABC, 1973)
- Clark Terry, Memories of Duke (Pablo Today, 1980)
- Stanley Turrentine, Do You Have Any Sugar? (Concord Vista, 1999)
- Jack Wilson, Something Personal (Blue Note, 1966)
- Jerry Yester, Farewell Aldebaran (Straight, 1969)
- Lester Young and Harry Edison, Pres and Sweets (Norgran, 1955)
- V.A., Jazz: Live from New York (Telarc, 2001)
