= The Complete Capitol Collection (Dick Haymes album) =

Compilation album by Dick Haymes
- Released: 2006
- Recorded: 1955, 1956, 1957
- Genre: Pop, Jazz
- Length: ?
- Label: EMI gold 0946 3 71389 2 2
- Producer: Ken Barnes

Dick Haymes chronology
?	The Complete Capitol Collection	?

Professional ratings
Review scores
Source	Rating
Allmusic	4/5 stars

The Complete Capitol Collection is a compilation album from Argentine singer Dick Haymes released in 2006.

Many Haymes fans and Jazz/ crooner aficionados have eagerly awaited the release of these great recordings from Haymes' catalogue.

This marked the first time a complete collection of all his Capitol recordings was released.

== Track listing ==
Disc 1:

1. "It Might as Well Be Spring" (Richard Rodgers, Oscar Hammerstein II)
2. "The More I See You" (Harry Warren, Mack Gordon)
3. "The Very Thought of You" (Ray Noble)
4. "You'll Never Know" (Harry Warren, Mack Gordon)
5. "If There Is Someone Lovelier Than You" (Arthur Schwartz, Howard Dietz)
6. "How Deep is the Ocean?" (Irving Berlin)
7. "The Nearness of You" (Hoagy Carmichael, Ned Washington)
8. "Where or When" (Richard Rodgers, Lorenz Hart)
9. "Little White Lies" (Walter Donaldson)
10. "Our Love Is Here to Stay" (George Gershwin, Ira Gershwin)
11. "Love Walked In" (George Gershwin, Ira Gershwin)
12. "Come Rain or Come Shine" (Harold Arlen, Johnny Mercer)
13. "I Never Get Enough Of You" (Bob Haymes)
14. "C'est la vie" (E.R. White, Maxwell Wolfson)
15. "Love is a Great Big Nothin" (Dolores Vicki Silvers)
16. "Two Different Worlds" (Al Frisch, Sid Wayne)
17. "Now At Last" (Bob Haymes) (Out-Take)
18. "Now At Last" (Bob Haymes)
19. "Rainbow's End" (Paul Francis Webster, Leon Pober) (Out-Take)
20. "Rainbow's End" (Paul Francis Webster, Leon Pober) (previously unreleased)

Disc 2:

1. "If I Should Lose You" (Ralph Rainger, Leo Robin)
2. "You Don't Know What Love Is" (Gene de Paul, Don Raye)
3. "Imagination" (Jimmy Van Heusen, Johnny Burke)
4. "Skylark" (Hoagy Carmichael, Johnny Mercer)
5. "Isn't This a Lovely Day (to Be Caught in the Rain?)" (Irving Berlin)
6. "What's New?" (Bob Haggart, Johnny Burke)
7. "The Way You Look Tonight" (Jerome Kern, Dorothy Fields)
8. "Then I'll Be Tired of You" (Yip Harburg, Arthur Schwartz)
9. "I Like the Likes of You" (Vernon Duke, Yip Harburg)
10. "Moonlight Becomes You" (Jimmy Van Heusen, Johnny Burke)
11. "Between the Devil and the Deep Blue Sea" (Harold Arlen, Ted Koehler)
12. "When I Fall in Love" (Victor Young, Edward Heyman)
13. "Never Leave Me" (Gordon Jenkins)
14. "New York's My Home" (Gordon Jenkins)
15. "My Love For Carmen" (Jackie Gleason) (Out-Take)
16. "My Love For Carmen" (Jackie Gleason) (previously unreleased)

=== Recording musicians ===
==== Single sessions ====
June 25, 1956: With the Billy May Orchestra

- I Never Get Enough Of You
- C'est la vie
- Love Is A Great Big Nothin'

June 26, 1956: With the Ian Bernard Orchestra

- Now At Last
- Rainbow's End (unreleased)
- Two Different Worlds

August 13, 1956 With the Gordon Jenkins Orchestra and Chorus

- Never Leave Me
- New York's My Home

April 4, 1957 With the Jackie Gleason Orchestra

- My Love For Carmen (unreleased)

See the entries for the original albums: Rain Or Shine and Moondreams for information on those sessions.

== Sources ==
- The booklet of the CD collection: The Complete Capitol Collection, written by Ruth Prigozy and Ken Barnes.
