= Breaking Out =

Breaking Out may refer to:

- Breaking Out (album), 1980 album by Buddy Guy
- Breaking Out (film), 1999 Swedish film
- "Breaking Out", song from Riff Raff by Dave Edmunds

== See also ==
- Breakin' Out
