= The Alternate Blues =

Studio album by Clark Terry, Freddie Hubbard and Dizzy Gillespie with Oscar Peterson
- Released: 1982
- Recorded: March 10, 1980
- Studio: Group IV Studios, Los Angeles
- Genre: Jazz
- Length: 40:01
- Label: Pablo Today
- Producer: Norman Granz

Dizzy Gillespie chronology
The Trumpet Summit Meets the Oscar Peterson Big 4 (1980)	The Alternate Blues (1982)	Digital at Montreux, 1980 (1980)

Professional ratings
Review scores
Source	Rating
AllMusic	3/5 stars
The Penguin Guide to Jazz Recordings	3/4 stars
The Rolling Stone Album Guide	2/5 stars

The Alternate Blues is a 1982 album featuring the trumpeters Clark Terry, and Freddie Hubbard, Dizzy Gillespie supported by a quartet led by Oscar Peterson. It was recorded at Group IV Studios, Los Angeles on March 10, 1980. With one exception, the tracks were previously unissued recordings from The Trumpet Summit Meets the Oscar Peterson Big 4.

== Track listing ==
1. "Alternate Blues": Alternate One – 5:33
2. "Alternate Blues": Alternate Two – 8:04
3. "Alternate Blues": Alternate Three – 9:05
4. "Alternate Blues": Alternate Four – 9:36
5. "Wrap Your Troubles in Dreams (And Dream Your Troubles Away)" (Harry Barris, Ted Koehler, Billy Moll) – 8:55
6. Ballad Medley: "Here's That Rainy Day"/"The Gypsy"/"If I Should Lose You" (Jimmy Van Heusen, Johnny Burke)/(Billy Reid)/(Ralph Rainger, Leo Robin) – 7:37

== Personnel ==
- Oscar Peterson – piano
- Dizzy Gillespie - trumpet
- Clark Terry – trumpet, flugelhorn
- Freddie Hubbard - trumpet, flugelhorn
- Joe Pass – guitar
- Ray Brown – bass
- Bobby Durham – drums
