= Rain or Shine (Dick Haymes album) =

Rain Or Shine

Studio album by Dick Haymes
- Released: 1956
- Recorded: December 20–23, 1955
- Genre: Pop, jazz
- Label: Capitol, T-713

Dick Haymes chronology
Rain Or Shine (1956)	Moondreams (1957)

Professional ratings
Review scores
Source	Rating
Allmusic	link

Rain Or Shine is an album from Dick Haymes. Released in 1956 and with musical direction by Ian Bernard plus Johnny Mandel on Love Is Here To Stay and Come Rain Or Come Shine.

== Track listing ==
Track	Song title	Originally By	Time
1.	"It Might as Well Be Spring"	Richard Rodgers and Oscar Hammerstein	3:10
2.	"The More I See You"	Harry Warren and Mack Gordon	2:51
3.	"The Very Thought of You"	Ray Noble	3:35
4.	"You'll Never Know"	Harry Warren and Mack Gordon	2:25
5.	"If There Is Someone Lovelier Than You"	Arthur Schwartz and Howard Dietz	3:02
6.	"How Deep Is the Ocean?"	Irving Berlin	3:24
7.	"The Nearness of You"	Hoagy Carmichael and Ned Washington	3:21
8.	"Where or When"	Richard Rodgers and Lorenz Hart	3:27
9.	"Little White Lies"	Walter Donaldson	2:34
10.	"Our Love Is Here to Stay"	Ira Gershwin and George Gershwin	3:19
11.	"Love Walked In"	George Gershwin and Ira Gershwin	1:41
12.	"Come Rain or Come Shine"	Johnny Mercer, Harold Arlen	3:23

== Recording musicians ==
- Harold Arlen Composer
- Irving Berlin Composer
- Ian Bernard Conductor, Primary Artist
- Hoagy Carmichael Composer
- Howard Dietz Composer
- Walter Donaldson Composer
- George Gershwin Composer
- Ira Gershwin Composer
- Mack Gordon Composer
- Oscar Hammerstein II Composer
- Lorenz Hart Composer
- Dick Haymes Primary Artist, Vocals
- Herman Leonard Cover Photo
- Johnny Mercer Composer
- Ray Noble Composer
- Richard Rodgers Composer
- Arthur Schwartz Composer
- Harry Warren Composer
- Ned Washington Composer

== Sources ==
- The booklet of the CD collection: The Complete Capitol Collection, written by Ruth Prigozy and Ken Barnes.
