= Capri Records (Jazz record label) =

U.S. jazz record label

Capri Records Ltd.
- Founded: 1984
- Founder: Thomas C. Burns
- Genre: Jazz
- Country of origin: U.S.
- Location: Bailey, Colorado
- Official website: www.caprirecords.com

Capri Records Ltd. is a jazz record label founded by record collector, photographer, and recording engineer Thomas C. Burns. Burns formed the Capri label following his Record Revival store which is now known as Jazz Record Revival, along with his future Tapestry Records label. The Colorado-based Capri Records has a catalog of more than one hundred titles by musicians such as bassists Ray Brown and Red Mitchell, trombonists Al Grey and Phil Wilson, saxophonist Bud Shank and drummer Louie Bellson.

== History ==
Thomas C. Burns founded Capri Records in Denver, Colorado in 1984 while concentrating on musicians with ties to Colorado. Capri Records began producing albums with locally linked musicians such as Fred Hess, Ron Miles, Spike Robinson, Keith Oxman, and Ellyn Rucker.

Burns' Capri Records also released albums with many more artists outside of Colorado including musicians Ray Brown, Ron Miles, Jimmy Rowles and Mike Jones.

From 1987 through the early 1990s, Burns produced albums receiving multiple honors and awards. The Clayton-Hamilton Jazz Orchestra received a Grammy Award nomination for their album Groove Shop and also received two Golden Feather Awards.

In 2013 Jeff Hamilton and his trio recorded an album with actor Wilford Brimley; Gary Smulyan wanted to make a recording of Neapolitan melodies with actor and singer Dominic Chianese, who was known for his vocal treatments of classic Italian tunes. Ali Ryerson (participated with Holly Hofmann and Frank Wess in the 2006 album Flutology) approached Tom Burns with the idea of an all-flute big band and recorded Game Changer.

== Artists ==
- Louie Bellson
- Joe Bonner
- Joshua Breakstone
- Ray Brown
- Clayton/Hamilton Jazz Orchestra
- Bob Cooper
- John Fedchock
- Curtis Fuller
- Joe Gilman
- Al Grey
- Jeff Hamilton Trio
- Atsuko Hashimoto
- Fred Hess
- Ernie Krivda
- Ron Miles
- Red Mitchell
- Grachan Moncur III
- Stephanie Nakasian
- Ken Peplowski
- Frank Potenza
- Spike Robinson
- Jimmy Rowles
- Ali Ryerson
- Bud Shank
- Gary Smulyan
- Jiggs Whigham
- Phil Wilson
- Mike Wofford
- Phil Woods

== Discography ==
Capri Records Ltd. - Jazz Record Label In Bailey, Colorado - Recorded Albums - Complete Discography - Producer Thomas C. Burns

| Robert Yelin | Night Rain | 1982 | LP | 40223 |
|---|---|---|---|---|
| Spike Robinson, Martin Taylor, Dave Green, Spike Wells | London Reprise | 1984 | LP | 8984 |
| Spike Robinson | Spring Can Really Hang You Up The Most | 1985 | LP | 45364 |
| Spike Robinson Quintet | It's A Wonderful World | 1985 | LP | 72185-2 |
| Spike Robinson | Spring Can Really Hang You Up The Most | 1986 | CD, Album | 71785 |
| Spike Robinson, Al Cohn Quintet | Henry B. Meets Alvin G. “Once In A Wild” | 1987 | LP | 61787 |
| Paul Warburton, Dale Bruning | Our Delight | 1987 | LP | 7986 |
| Ellyn Rucker | Ellyn | 1988 | LP | 10187 |
| Spike Robinson, Rob Mullins | The Odd Couple | 1989 | CD | 74008-2 |
| Jimmy Rowles, Red Mitchell, Donald Bailey | Trio | 1989 | CD | 74009-2 |
| Ellyn Rucker | This Heart Of Mine | 1989 | CD | 74010-2 |
| Holly Hofmann With Mike Wofford, Bob Magnusson, Sherman Ferguson | Take Note! | 1989 | CD | 74011-2 |
| Spike Robinson, “Sweets” Edison Quintet | Jusa Bit ‘O’ Blues Volume 1 | 1989 | CD | 74012-2 |
| Spike Robinson, “Sweets” Edison Quintet | Jusa Bit ‘O’ Blues Volume 2 | 1989 | CD | 74013-2 |
| Ron Miles | Witness | 1990 | CD | 74014-2 |
| Art Resnick | A Gift | 1990 | CD | 74015-2 |
| Holly Hofmann Quartet | Further Adventures | 1990 | CD, Album | 74022-2 |
| Clayton-Hamilton Jazz Orchestra | Groove Shop | 1990 | CD, Album | 74021-2 |
| Ray Brown, John clayton | Super Bass | 1990 | CD, Album | 74018-2 |
| Jiggs Whigham, Bud Shank John Clayton, George Cables, Jeff Hamilton | The Jiggs Up | 1990 | CD, Album | 74024-2 |
| Tony Lugan | Magic Circle | 1990 | CD | 74023-2 |
| Bud Shank | Tales Of The Pilot - The Music Of David Peck | 1990 | CD, Album | 74025-2 |
| Bud Shank And The Roumanis String Quartet | Drifting Timelessly | 1991 | CD | 75001-2 |
| George Roumanis | Jazz Rhapsody For Guitar And Orchestra / Bayside Rhapsody For Guitar And Strings | 1991 | CD | 75002-2 |
| Red Mitchell With Kenny Barron & Ben Riley | Talking | 1991 | CD | 74016-2 |
| Pete Christlieb, Bob Copper | Mosaic - Live | 1991 | CD, Album | 74026-2 |
| The Clayton-Hamilton Jazz Orchestra | Heart And Soul | 1991 | CD | 74028-2 |
| Dee Daniels | Let’s Talk Business | 1991 | CD, Album | 74027-22 |
| Mark Masters Jazz Orchestra With Billy Harper And Jimmy Knepper | Priestess | 1991 | CD | 74031-2 |
| Ellyn Rucker | Ellyn | 1992 | CD | 74007-2 |
| Ray Brown Featuring Pierre Boussaguet, Jacky Terrasson | Ray Brown’s New “Two Bass Hits” | 1992 | CD, RM | 74034-2 |
| Spike Robinson | Reminiscin’ | 1992 | CD | 74029-2 |
| Al Grey | Fab | 1992 | CD | 74038-2 |
| Ellyn Rucker & Friends | Thoughts Of You | 1992 | CD | 74036-2 |
| The Clayton Brothers | The Music | 1992 | CD | 74037-2 |
| Al Grey & Jon Hendricks | Christmas Stockin’ Stuffer | 1992 | CD | 74039-2 |
| Fred Hess | Sweet Thunder | 1993 | CD | 74032-2 |
| Phil Wilson, NDR Big Band | The Wizard Of Oz Suite | 1993 | CD | 74040-2 |
| Joshua Breakstone | Sittin’ On The Thing With Ming | 1993 | CD | 74042-2 |
| The Steve Spiegl Big Band | Then And Now | 1993 | CD, Album | 71002-2 |
| Tony Lujan | Zulu | 1994 | CD | 74041-2 |
| John Gunther, Greg Gisbert | Big Lunage | 1994 | CD, Album | 74035-2 |
| Barry Wedgle | The Antidote | 1994 | CD | 74044-2 |
| Louie Bellson | Don't Stop Now | 1994 | CD | 71001-2 |
| Red Mitchell, Joe Beck | Live At Salishan | 1994 | CD | 74033-2 |
| Tony Lujan | Zulu | 1994 | CD | 74041-2 |
| Spike Robinson & Ellyn Rucker | Nice Work! | 1995 | CD | 74017-2 |
| Fred Hess | You Know I Care | 1995 | CD | 74045-2 |
| Spike Robinson | A Real Corker | 1995 | CD | 74043-2 |
| Keith Oxman, Andy Weyl, Mark Diamond, Jill F Rederickson, Paul Romaine | A Little Taste | 1996 | CD | 74046-2 |
| Keith Oxman | Soul Eyes | 1997 | CD | 74047-2 |
| Dale Underwood, George Roumanis | Symphonically Yours | 1997 | CD | 75003-2 |
| Keith Oxman | Out On A Whim | March 1998 | CD | 74048-2 |
| Ron Miles Trio | Ron Miles Trio | 1999 | CD | 74049-2 |
| Keith Oxman | Hard Times | March 2000 | CD | 74050-2 |
| Michael Pagán Trio | Tacitus Plus | 2000 | CD | 71003-2 |
| Joe Bonner | Monkisms | 2000 | CD | 74030-2 |
| Spike Robinson, Al Cohn Quintet | Henry B. Meets Alvin G. “Once In A Wild” | 2000 | CD, RE | 74006-2 |
| Phil Wilson & The NDR Big Band | Pal Joey Suite | 2000 | HDCD | 74051-2 |
| Joshua Breakstone | Tomorrow’s Hours – Joshua Breakstone plays The Music Of Wes Montgomery | March 12, 2002 | CD | 74054-2 |
| Convergence | Hometown | 2002 | CD | 74052-2 |
| Nat Yarbrough | El Yabah | 2002 | CD | 74053-2 |
| Michael Pagán | Nobody Else But Me | 2002 | CD | 74055-2 |
| Keith Oxman | Brainstorm | February 2003 | CD | 74056-2 |
| Big Swing Trio | Travels | June 24, 2003 | CD | 74057-2 |
| Ellyn Rucker Featuring Dave Young | Now | 2003 | CD | 74058-2 |
| Mark Masters Ensemble | The Clifford Brown Project | 2003 | CD | 74059-2 |
| Flutology | First Date | 2003 | SACD, Hybrid | 74060-2 |
| Convergence | Modern Man | 2003 | CD | 74061-2 |
| John Hines | In The Pocket | 2004 | CD | 74062-2 |
| Colin Stranahan Quintet | Dreams Untold | 2004 | CD | 74063-2 |
| Lee Konitz With The Mark Masters Ensemble | One Day With Lee | 2004 | CD | 74064-2 |
| Joshua Breakstone | A Jamais | 2004 | CD, Album | 74065-2 |
| Holly Hofmann | Minor Miracle | 2004 | SACD, Hybrid | 74066-2 |
| Mike Wofford Trio | Mike Wofford Trio Live At Anthenaeum Jazz | 2003 | SACD, Hybrid | 74067-2 |
| Grachan Moncur III | Exploration | 2004 | CD | 74068-2 |
| Mark Masters Ensemble | Porgy & Bess Redefined | 2005 | CD | 74069-2 |
| Joshua Breakstone | Memoire – The French Sessions Volume 2 | 2005 | CD | 74070-2 |
| Bud Shank Quartet With Phil Woods | Bouncing With Bud & Phil – Live At Yoshi’s | 2005 | CD | 74071-2 |
| Michael Pagán Big Band | Pag’s Groove | 2005 | CD | 74072-2 |
| Nat Yarbrough | Triple Play | 2005 | CD | 74073-2 |
| Colin Stranahan | Transformation | 2006 | CD | 74074-2 |
| Keith Oxman, Curtis Fuller | Duets In Progress | February 2006 | CD | 74075-2 |
| The Joe Gilman Trio | View So Tender – Wonder Revisited Volume One | May 16, 2006 | CD | 74076-2 |
| 3osity | 3osity | 2006 | CD | 74077-2 |
| Mark Masters Ensemble | Wish Me Well | 2006 | CD | 74078-2 |
| Phil Wilson’s Pan American All-Stars | Celebrate The Music Of Antonio Carlos ‘Tom’ Jobim | 2006 | CD | 74079-2 |
| Max Wagner | This Can't Be Love | 2006 | CD | 74080-2 |
| Chris Stephens Trio | Holding On To What Counts | 2006 | CD | 74082-2 |
| Bob Hamilton | WixWax | 2007 | CD | 74083-2 |
| Andy Nevala | Alone Together | September 2007 | CD | 74084-2 |
| Holly Hofmann, Mike Wofford | Live At Anthenaeum Jazz Volume 2 | March 2007 | CD | 74085-2 |
| Chie Imaizumi | Unfailing Kindness | 2007 | CD | 74081-2 |
| The Joe Gilman Trio | View so Tender - Wonder Revisited Volume Two | October 23, 2007 | CD | 74066-2 |
| Cique | Cique | 2008 | CD | 74087-2 |
| Convergence | I Can Be There | 2008 | CD | 74088-2 |
| Mark Masters Ensemble | Farewell Walter Dewey Redman | 2008 | CD | 74089-2 |
| Peter Sommer & Rich Perry | Crossroads | May 2008 | CD | 74090-2 |
| Chip McNeil | Four Steps 3 | 2008 | CD | 74091-2 |
| Keith Oxman | Caught Between The Lion And The Twins | July 2008 | CD | 74092-2 |
| Frank Potenza | Old, New, Borrowed & Blue | 2009 | CD | 74093-2 |
| Keith Oxman | Doing All Right | August 2009 | CD | 74094-2 |
| The Joshua Breakstone Trio | No One New | August 18, 2009 | CD | 74095-2 |
| Graham Dechter | Right On Time | September 2009 | CD | 74096-2 |
| Jeff Hamilton Trio | Symbiosis | September 2009 | CD | 74097-2 |
| Ken Peplowski, Shelley Berg, Jay Leonhart, Joe La Barbera | Noir Blue | March 16, 2009 | CD | 74098-2 |
| Holly Hofmann - Bill Cunliffe | Three’s Company | 2010 | CD | 74099-2 |
| Curtis Fuller | I Will Tell Her | June 2010 | 2 x CD | 74100-2 |
| John Fedchock NY Sextet | Live At The Red Sea Jazz Festival | 2010 | CD, Album | 74102-2 |
| Phil Wilson & Makoto Ozone | Live!! At The Berklee Performance Center | 2010 | CD, RE, RM | 71005-2 |
| Michael Pagán Trio | Three For The Ages | 2010 | CD | 74101-2 |
| Adam Schroeder | A Handful Of Stars | July 20, 2010 | CD | 74103-2 |
| Chie Imaizumi | Time Of New Beginnings | 2010 | CD | 74104-2 |
| Joe Gilman | Americanvas | 2010 | CD | 74105-2 |
| Jake Fryer - Bud Shank Quintet | In Good Company | 2011 | CD | 74106-2 |
| Atsuko Hashimoto | Until The Sun Comes Up | 2011 | CD | 74107-2 |
| Ken Peplowski | In Search Of... | 2011 | CD | 74108-2 |
| Walt Weiskopf Quartet | Live | 2011 | CD | 74109-2 |
| Ernie Krivda | Blues For Pekar | 2011 | CD | 74110-2 |
| Mike Wofford, Holly Hofmann Quintet | Turn Signal | January 2012 | CD | 74111-2 |
| Stranahan, Zaleski, Rosato | Anticipation | 2011 | CD | 74112-2 |
| Gary Smulyan | Smul’s Paradise | 2012 | CD | 74113-2 |
| Jeff Hamilton Trio | Red Sparkle | February 2012 | CD | 74114-2 |
| Stephanie Nakassian With The Harris Simon Trio | Show Me The Way To Get Out Of This World | June 2012 | CD | 74115-2 |
| Curtis Fuller | Down Home | 2012 | CD | 74116-2 |
| Graham Dechter | Takin’ It There | 2012 | CD | 74117-2 |
| Mark Masters Ensemble | Ellington Saxophone Encounters | 2012 | CD | 74118-2 |
| Joe Gilman | Relativity | 2012 | CD | 74119-2 |
| Chip Stephens Trio | Relevancy | 2013 | CD | 74120-2 |
| Mike Wofford | It's Personal | June 2013 | CD | 74121-2 |
| Tom Kennedy | Just Play! | 2013 | CD | 74122-2 |
| Mark Masters Ensemble | Everything You did – The Music Of Walter Becker & Donald Fagen | July 2013 | CD | 74123-2 |
| Ali Ryerson Jazz Flute Big Band | Game Changer | 2013 | CD | 74124-2 |
| Ken Peplowski | Maybe September | 2013 | CD | 74125-2 |
| Mike Jones Trio | Plays Well With Others | 2013 | CD | 74126-2 |
| Frank Potenza | For Joe | 2013 | CD | 74127-2 |
| Wilford Brimley With The Jeff Hamilton Trio | Wilford Brimley With The Jeff Hamilton Trio | September 17, 2013 | CD | 74128-2 |
| Gary Smulyan | Bella Napoli with Dominic Chianese | 2013 | CD | 74129-2 |
| Stranahan, Zaleski, Rosato | Limitless | 2013 | CD | 74130-2 |
| Joshua Breakstone | With The Wind And The Rain – Guitar Trio/Cello Quartet | January 24, 2014 | CD | 74131-2 |
| Clayton-Hamilton Jazz Orchestra | L.A. Treasures Project | 2014 | CD | 74132-2 |
| Holly Hofmann | Low-Life – The Alto Flute Project | May 2014 | CD | 74133-2 |
| Adam Schroeder | Let’s | 2014 | CD | 74134-2 |
| Larry Fuller | Larry Fuller | September 2014 | CD | 74135-2 |
| Jeff Hamilton Trio | Great American Songs Through The Years | 2014 | CD | 71005-2 |
| Charles McPherson | The Journey | 2015 | CD | 74136-2 |
| Joshua Breakstone | 2nd Avenue – The Return Of The Cello Quartet Artist | May 2015 | CD | 74137-2 |
| Terell Stafford | BrotherLee Love – Celebrating Lee Morgan | 2018 | LP | 74138-1 |
| Terell Stafford | BrotherLee Love – Celebrating Lee Morgan | June 2015 | CD, Album | 74138-2 |
| Scott Hamilton With Jeff Hamilton Trio | Live In Bern | 2015 | CD | 74139-2 |
| Ernie Krivda | Requiem For A Jazz Lady | 2015 | CD | 74140-2 |
| Ken Peplowski | Enrapture | February 2016 | CD | 74141-2 |
| Mike Jones Trio | Roaring | 2016 | CD | 74142-2 |
| Mark Masters Ensemble | Blue Skylight | February 2017 | CD | 74143-2 |
| Joshua Breakstone | 88 | October 2016 | CD | 74144-2 |
| Keith Oxman | East Of The Village | February 2017 | CD | 74145-2 |
| Katie Thiroux | Off Beat | August 18, 2017 | CD | 74146-2 |
| Jeff Hamilton Trio | Live From San Pedro | 2018 | CD | 74147-2 |
| Mike Jones, Penn Jillette | The Show Before The Show | 2018 | CD | 74148-2 |
| Mike Jones, Penn Jillette | The Show Before The Show – Live At The Penn & Teller Theater | March 2018 | LP, 180Gram | 74148-1 |
| Ernie Krivda & Swing City | A Bright And Shining Moment | June 2018 | CD | 74149-2 |
| Mark Masters | Our Metier | 2018 | CD | 74150-2 |
| Joshua Breakstone | Children Of Art – A Tribute To Art Blakey’s Jazz Messengers | 2018 | CD | 74151-2 |
| Keith Oxman | Glimpses | September 2018 | CD | 74152-2 |
| Ehud Asherie Trio | Wild Man Blues | March 2019 | CD | 74153-2 |
| Jazz Worms | Squirmin’ | March 19, 2021 | LP | 74154-1 |
| Larry Fuller | Overjoyed | May 2019 | CD | 74155-2 |
| Mark Turner Meets Gary Foster | Mark Turner Meets Gary Foster | 2019 | 2 x CD | 74156-2 |
| Stranahan, Zaleski, Rosato | Live At The Jazz Standard | 2019 | CD | 74157-2 |
| Graham Dechter | Major Influence | 2021 | CD | 74158-2 |
| Chip Stephens, Glenn Wilson | Sadness & Soul | October 2019 | CD | 74159-2 |
| Akiko, Hamilton, Dechter | Equal Time | 2019 | CD | 74160-2 |
| Keith Oxman | Two Cigarettes In The Dark | March 2020 | CD | 74161-2 |
| Mark Masters | Night Talk – The Alec Wilder Song Book | 2021 | CD | 74162-2 |
| Jeff Hamilton Trio | Catch Me If You Can | July 2020 | CD | 74163-2 |
| Sheila Jordan | Comes Love – Lost Session 1960 | 2021 | LP | 74164-1 |
| Sheila Jordan | Comes Love – Lost Session 1960 | 2021 | CD | 74164-2 |
| Keith Oxman, Frank Morelli | The Ox-Mo Incident | May 21, 2021 | CD | 74165-2 |
| Mark Masters | Masters & Baron Meet Blanton & Webster | 2021 | CD | 74166-2 |
| Jeff Hamilton Trio | Merry & Bright | October 1, 2021 | CD | 74167-2 |
| Keith Oxman | This One’s For Joey | 2022 | CD | 74168-2 |

Tapestry Records Recorded Albums

| Mother Gong | Tree In Fish | 1994 | CD | 76000-2 |
|---|---|---|---|---|
| The Unbound | Jazz Recidivists | 1996 | CD | 76001-2 |
| Fred Hess/Boulder Creative Music Ensemble – The Complete Studio Recordings | Between The Lines | 1998 | CD | 76002-2 |
| The Return Of Fred Hess/Boulder Creative Music Ensemble | Ninth Street Park | 1998 | CD | 76003-2 |
| Fred Hess Quartet | Extended Family | 2002 | CD | 76004-2 |
| Fred Hess, Mark Sabatella | Right At Home | 2002 | CD | 76005-2 |
| The Fred Hess Quartet | The Long And Short Of It | 2004 | CD | 76006-2 |
| Fred Hess Quartet | Crossed Paths | 2004 | CD | 76007-2 |
| Peter Sommer With Art Lande | Sioux County | 2005 | CD | 76008-2 |
| The Fred Hess Band | How ‘Bout Now | 2006 | CD | 76009-2 |
| Eileen Simon | The Visit | 2009 | CD | 76010-2 |
| 3ology | 3ology With Ron Miles | 2009 | CD | 76011-2 |
| Colin Stranahan | Life Condition | 2009 | CD | 76013-2 |
| Michael Pagán With Colorado Saxophone Quartet | 12 Preludes & Fugues | 2010 | CD | 76014-2 |
| Jim Stranahan | Free For All | 2010 | CD | 76015-2 |
| Eric Erhardt | A Better Fate | 2012 | CD | 76016-2 |
| Polarity | King Of Hearts | 2012 | CD | 76017-2 |
| Danny Green | A Thousand Ways Home | 2012 | CD | 76018-2 |
| Colorado Conservatory For The Jazz Arts | Hang Time | 2013 | CD | 76019-2 |
| Felipe Salles Featuring Randy Brecker | Departure | 2012 | CD | 76020-2 |
| The Orion Saxophone Quartet With Special Guest Gary Foster | Among Friends | 2013 | CD | 76021-2 |
| Jim Stranahan Little Big Band | Migration To Higher Ground | 2014 | CD | 76022-2 |
| Felipe Salles | Ugandan Suite | 2013 | CD | 76023-2 |
| The Ron Jolly Trio | The Friend Suite | 2013 | CD | 76024-2 |
| The Jeff Benedict Big Band | Holmes | 2015 | CD | 76025-2 |
| The Girshevich Trio Featuring Eddie Gomez | Algorithmic Society | 2016 | CD | 76026-2 |
| Felipe Salles Interconnections Ensemble | The Lullaby Project – And other Works For Large Ensemble | 2018 | CD | 76028-2 |
| Dave Askren, Jeff Benedict | Paraphernalia – Music Of Wayne Shorter | May 1, 2020 | CD | 76029-2 |
| Felipe Salles – Interconnections Ensemble | The New Immigrant Experience – Music Inspired By Conversations With Dreamers | 2020 | CD | 76030-2 |
| Felipe Salles | Tiyo’s Songs Of Life | 2022 | CD | 76031-2 |
| | | | | KellyBlueNote |

- Tapestry Records - Recorded Albums
  Ellyn Rucker and Friends, Thoughts of You
- Ron Miles, Trio
- Joshua Breakstone, Tomorrow's Hours
- Mark Masters Ensemble, American Jazz Institute Presents The Clifford Brown Project
- Flutology, First Date
- Mark Masters, One Day With Lee
- Phil Wilson's Pan American All-Stars, Celebrate the Music of Antonio Carlos Tom Jobim
- Curtis Fuller, I Will Tell Her
- Chip Stephens Trio, Relevancy
- Mike Wofford, It's Personal
- Tom Kennedy, Just Play
- Mark Masters, Everything You Did
- Ali Ryerson and the Jazz Flute Big Band, Game Changer
- Ken Peplowski, Maybe September
- Jeff Hamilton, Wilford Brimley with the Jeff Hamilton Trio
- Frank Potenza, For Joe
- Mike Jones Trio, Plays Well with Others
- Gary Smulyan/Dominic Chianese, Bella Napoli
- Joshua Breakstone, With the Wind and the Rain
