= Bam Bam Bam =

Live album by Ray Brown
- Released: 1989
- Recorded: 1988
- Genre: Jazz
- Label: Concord Jazz
- Producer: Carl E. Jefferson

Ray Brown chronology
Breakin' Out (1987)	Bam Bam Bam (1989)	Georgia on My Mind (1989)

Bam Bam Bam is a live album by the American musician Ray Brown, credited to his trio. It was released in 1989 by Concord Jazz.

== Production ==
The album was recorded at the 1988 Fujitsu-Concord Jazz Festival, in Tokyo, Japan, with Brown backed by Gene Harris on piano and Jeff Hamilton on drums. The title track was written by Brown. "A Night in Tunisia" is a version of the Dizzy Gillespie composition. "Rio" was written by Victor Feldman. "Summertime" is an interpretation of the George Gershwin standard. "F.S.R. (For Sonny Rollins)" is based on Rollins's "Doxy".

== Critical reception ==
Professional ratings
Review scores
Source	Rating
AllMusic	3/5 stars
Bebop	8/10
Calgary Herald	B
MusicHound Jazz: The Essential Album Guide	3/5 stars
Omaha World-Herald	3.5/5 stars
The Penguin Guide to Jazz on CD, LP & Cassette	3.5/4 stars
The Virgin Encyclopedia of Jazz	3/5 stars
The Windsor Star	B

The Windsor Star stated that "the set has catchy originals, standards and three cuts featuring ... Brown's cello-like arco, Hamilton hand-drumming and Harris rolling out blues breaks and funky snatches." The Ottawa Citizen said that Brown is "the complete musician, setting the perfect tempo, balancing the instrumental voices, coming up with meaty but unobtrusive bass figures, showcasing the talents of his sidemen in precisely the right settings." The Chicago Tribune opined that Brown "is one of the few players who can pull [melodic bass work] off without making it seem like a gimmick." The Calgary Herald praised Brown's "tasty intros and assured solo flights." The Times-Colonist concluded that the trio "demonstrate the essence of great ensemble jazz playing."

== Track listing ==
No.	Title	Lyrics	Music	Length
1.	"Introductory Announcement"
2.	"F.S.R. (For Sonny Rollins)"
3.	"Put Your Little Foot Right Out"
4.	"Rio"
5.	"If I Loved You"	Oscar Hammerstein II	Richard Rodgers
6.	"Introductory Announcement"
7.	"Summertime"	DuBose Heyward, Ira Gershwin	George Gershwin
8.	"Days of Wine and Roses"	Johnny Mercer	Henry Mancini
9.	"Introductory Announcement"
10.	"A Night in Tunisia"	Jon Hendricks	Dizzy Gillespie
11.	"Bam Bam Bam"
