= Moondreams =

Moondreams may refer to:

- Moondreams (Dick Haymes album)
- Moondreams (Walter Wanderley album)
- "Moondreams" (Norman Petty song)
- "Moon Dreams", a 1942 jazz standard

== See also ==
- MoonDreamers, an American animated television series that aired in 1986
- "Moon of Dreams", a 2008 song by Ruslana featuring T-Pain
