= The Trumpet Summit Meets the Oscar Peterson Big 4 =

Studio album by Dizzy Gillespie, Clark Terry, Freddie Hubbard
- Released: 1980
- Recorded: March 10, 1980
- Genre: Jazz
- Length: 37:49
- Label: Pablo Today
- Producer: Norman Granz

Dizzy Gillespie chronology
| Dizzy Gillespie Jam (1977) | The Trumpet Summit Meets the Oscar Peterson Big 4 (1980) | The Alternate Blues (1980) |

Professional ratings
Review scores
| Source | Rating |
|---|---|
| AllMusic | 4.5/5 stars |
| The Penguin Guide to Jazz Recordings | 2.5/4 stars |
| The Rolling Stone Jazz Record Guide | 4/5 stars |

The Trumpet Summit Meets the Oscar Peterson Big 4 is a 1980 album featuring the trumpeters Dizzy Gillespie, Clark Terry, and Freddie Hubbard, supported by a quartet led by Oscar Peterson. Outtakes from the 1980 session that produced this album were released as The Alternate Blues.

== Track listing ==
1. "Daahoud" (Clifford Brown) – 8:38
2. "Chicken Wings" (Ray Brown, Bobby Durham, Freddie Hubbard, Joe Pass, Oscar Peterson, Clark Terry) – 9:35
3. "Just Friends" (John Klenner, Sam M. Lewis) – 11:58
4. "The Champ" (Dizzy Gillespie) – 7:55

== Personnel ==
=== Performance ===
- Oscar Peterson – piano
- Clark Terry – trumpet
- Dizzy Gillespie – trumpet
- Freddie Hubbard – trumpet
- Joe Pass – guitar
- Ray Brown – bass
- Bobby Durham – drums
