= Ray Brown with the All-Star Big Band =

Studio album by Ray Brown
- Released: 1962
- Recorded: January 22–23 in New York City
- Genre: Jazz
- Length: 34:54
- Label: Verve Records V8444
- Producer: Jim Davis

Ray Brown chronology
Jazz Cello (1960)	Ray Brown with the All-Star Big Band (1962)	Much in Common (1962)

Professional ratings
Review scores
Source	Rating
Allmusic	3/5 stars

Ray Brown with the All-Star Big Band is a 1962 album by the jazz double bassist Ray Brown accompanied by a big band featuring the alto saxophonist Cannonball Adderley.

== Track listing ==
1. "Work Song" (Nat Adderley) – 5:17
2. "It Happened in Monterey" (Billy Rose, Mabel Wayne) – 3:06
3. "My One and Only Love" (Robert Mellin, Guy Wood) – 3:56
4. "Tricrotism" (Oscar Pettiford) – 3:54
5. "Thumbstring" (Ray Brown) – 4:42
6. "Cannon Bilt" (Brown) – 3:34
7. "Two for the Blues" (Neal Hefti, Jon Hendricks) – 4:07
8. "Day In, Day Out" (Rube Bloom, Johnny Mercer) – 2:49
9. "Baubles, Bangles, & Beads" (Robert Wright, George Forrest) – 3:29

== Personnel ==
- Ray Brown – double bass, cello
- Cannonball Adderley – alto saxophone
- Sam Jones – double bass
- Budd Johnson, Earle Warren, Jerome Richardson, Seldon Powell, Yusef Lateef – woodwind
- Britt Woodman, Jimmy Cleveland, Melba Liston, Paul Faulise – trombone
- Clark Terry, Ernie Royal, Joe Newman, Nat Adderley – trumpet
- Tommy Flanagan – piano
- Osie Johnson – drums
- Al Cohn – arranger
- Ernie Wilkins – arranger, conductor
- Ray Hall – engineer
- Burt Goldblatt, Chuck Stewart – photography
- Jim Davis – producer
