= Just the Way It Had to Be =

Live album by Milt Jackson
- Released: 1970
- Recorded: August 1–2, 1969
- Venue: Shelly's Manne-Hole, Hollywood, California
- Genre: Jazz
- Length: 41:54
- Label: Impulse!
- Producer: Ed Michel

Milt Jackson chronology
That's the Way It Is (1970)	Just the Way It Had to Be (1970)	Memphis Jackson (1970)

Just the Way It Had to Be is a live album by American jazz vibraphonist Milt Jackson featuring performances recorded at Shelly's Manne-Hole in 1969 for the Impulse! label.

== Reception ==
The Allmusic review by Scott Yanow awarded the album 3 stars stating "the music is quite likable, melodic and swinging (particularly for 1969)".

Professional ratings
Review scores
Source	Rating
Allmusic	3/5 stars

== Track listing ==
All compositions by Milt Jackson except as indicated

1. "Listen, Here" (Eddie Harris) – 8:30
2. "S.K.J." – 5:36
3. "Who Can I Turn To (When Nobody Needs Me)" (Leslie Bricusse, Anthony Newley) – 6:53
4. "If I Were a Bell" (Frank Loesser) – 6:01
5. "The Very Thought of You" (Ray Noble) – 8:02
6. "Bags' Groove" – 6:50

- Recorded at Shelly's Manne-Hole in Hollywood, California on August 1 & 2, 1969

== Personnel ==
- Milt Jackson – vibes
- Teddy Edwards – tenor saxophone
- Monty Alexander – piano
- Ray Brown – bass
- Dick Berk – drums
