= The Milt Jackson Big 4 =

Live album by Milt Jackson
- Released: 1975
- Recorded: July 17, 1975
- Genre: Jazz
- Length: 50:02
- Label: Pablo
- Producer: Norman Granz

Milt Jackson chronology
The Last Concert (1975)	The Milt Jackson Big 4 (1975)	The Big 3 (1975)

The Milt Jackson Big 4 is a live album by vibraphonist Milt Jackson featuring pianist Oscar Peterson recorded at the Montreux Jazz Festival in 1975 and released on the Pablo label.

== Reception ==
The Allmusic review by Scott Yanow awarded the album 4½ stars stating "Bags and O.P. always bring out the best in each other and this well-conceived set is no exception".

Professional ratings
Review scores
Source	Rating
Allmusic	4.5/5 stars

== Track listing ==
1. "Fuji Mama" (Blue Mitchell) - 6:34
2. "Everything Must Change" (Bernard Ighner) - 6:21
3. "Speedball" (Lee Morgan) - 7:54
4. "Nature Boy" (eden ahbez) - 4:30
5. "Stella by Starlight" (Ned Washington, Victor Young) - 7:20
6. "Like Someone in Love" (Johnny Burke, Jimmy van Heusen) - 5:56
7. "Night Mist Blues" (Ahmad Jamal) - 6:36
8. "Mack the Knife" (Bertolt Brecht, Kurt Weill) - 6:31

- Recorded at the Montreux Jazz Festival at the Casino de Montreux in Switzerland on July 17, 1975

== Personnel ==
- Milt Jackson – vibes
- Oscar Peterson - piano
- Niels-Henning Ørsted Pedersen - bass
- Mickey Roker - drums
