= Memphis Jackson =

Studio album by Milt Jackson with the Ray Brown Big Band
- Released: 1970
- Recorded: October 9–10, 1969
- Genre: Jazz
- Length: 37:53
- Label: Impulse!
- Producer: Ed Michel

Milt Jackson chronology
| Just the Way It Had to Be (1970) | Memphis Jackson (1970) | Plastic Dreams (1971) |

Ray Brown chronology
| Ray Brown / Milt Jackson (1965) | Memphis Jackson (1970) | This One's for Blanton! (1973) |

Memphis Jackson is an album by American jazz vibraphonist Milt Jackson featuring performances with the Ray Brown Big Band recorded in 1969 for the Impulse! label.

== Reception ==
The Allmusic review awarded the album 4.5 stars.

Professional ratings
Review scores
| Source | Rating |
|---|---|
| Allmusic | 4.5/5 stars |

== Track listing ==
All compositions by Milt Jackson except as indicated

1. "Uh-Huh" (Ray Brown) - 3:48
2. "One Mint Julep (One Way)" (Rudy Toombs) - 2:33
3. "Oh Happy Day" (Edwin Hawkins) - 3:30
4. "Memphis Junction" - 2:49
5. "Queen Mother Stomp" (Victor Feldman) - 6:30
6. "Braddock Breakdown" (Ray Brown) - 3:40
7. "A Sound for Sore Ears" (Jimmy Heath) - 3:02
8. "Enchanted Lady" - 5:06
9. "One Mint Julep (The Other Way)" (Toombs) - 2:44
10. "Picking Up the Vibrations (Ray Brown) - 4:11

- Recorded at Annex Recording Studios, Hollywood, California on October 9 (tracks 1–3, 6, 7, 9 & 10) and October 10 (tracks 4, 5 & 8), 1969

== Personnel ==
- Milt Jackson – vibes
- Al Aarons (tracks 4, 5 & 8), John Audino (tracks 1–3 & 9), Bud Brisbois (tracks 6, 7 & 10), Buddy Childers (tracks 1–3 & 9), Harry Edison (tracks 1–3, 6, 7, 9 & 10), Ollie Mitchell (tracks 6, 7 & 10) – trumpet
- Randy Aldcroft (tracks 1–3 & 9), Jimmy Cleveland (tracks 6, 7 & 10) – trombone
- Kenny Shroyer – bass trombone (tracks 6, 7 & 10)
- John T. Johnson – tuba (tracks 1–3 & 9)
- Ernie Watts – alto saxophone (tracks 1–3 & 9)
- Jim Horn – alto saxophone, flute, baritone saxophone (tracks 1–3, 6, 7, 9 & 10)
- Teddy Edwards – tenor saxophone (tracks 4–8 & 10)
- John Lowe – baritone saxophone (tracks 1–3 & 9)
- Mike Melvoin – piano, electric piano (tracks 1–3, 6, 7, 9 & 10)
- Joe Sample – electric piano (tracks 4, 5 & 8)
- Howard Roberts (tracks 4, 5 & 8), Fred Robinson (tracks 4–8 & 10) – guitar
- Ray Brown – bass, conductor
- Wilton Felder – electric bass
- Cubby O'Brien (tracks 6, 7 & 10), Paul Humphries (tracks 4, 5 8), Earl Palmer (tracks 1–3 & 9) – drums
- Victor Feldman – percussion (tracks 4, 5 & 8)
