= Jazz Cello =

Studio album by Ray Brown
- Released: 1960
- Recorded: August 31, September 1, 1960
- Genre: Jazz
- Length: 32:18
- Label: Verve
- Producer: Ken Druker

Ray Brown chronology
This Is Ray Brown (1956)	Jazz Cello (1960)	Ray Brown with the All-Star Big Band (1962)

Professional ratings
Review scores
Source	Rating
Allmusic	4/5 stars
The Penguin Guide to Jazz Recordings	3/4 stars

Jazz Cello is a 1960 album by Ray Brown.

== Track listing ==
1. "Tangerine" (Johnny Mercer, Victor Schertzinger) – 3:17
2. "Almost Like Being in Love" (Alan Jay Lerner, Frederick Loewe) – 4:14
3. "That Old Feeling" (Lew Brown, Sammy Fain) – 4:38
4. "Ain't Misbehavin'" (Harry Brooks, Andy Razaf, Fats Waller) – 5:12
5. "Alice Blue Gown" (Harry Tierney, Joseph McCarthy) - 2:40
6. "Rosalie" (Cole Porter) – 3:06
7. "But Beautiful" (Johnny Burke, Jimmy Van Heusen) – 4:00
8. "Poor Butterfly" (John Golden, Raymond Hubbell) – 3:17
9. "Memories of You" (Eubie Blake, Andy Razaf) – 4:53
10. "Rock-a-Bye Your Baby with a Dixie Melody" (Sam M. Lewis, Jean Schwartz, Joe Young) – 2:06

== Personnel ==
- Ray Brown – double bass, cello
- Jimmy Rowles – piano
- Joe Mondragon – double bass
- Dick Shanahan – drums
- Don Fagerquist – trumpet
- Harry Betts – trombone
- Jack Cave – French horn
- Bob Cooper, Med Flory, Bill Hood, Paul Horn – saxophones
- Russell Garcia – arranger, conductor
