= That's the Way It Is (Milt Jackson album) =

Live album by Milt Jackson
- Released: 1970
- Recorded: August 1–2, 1969
- Venue: Shelly's Manne-Hole, Hollywood, California
- Genre: Jazz
- Length: 42:21
- Label: Impulse!
- Producer: Ed Michel

Milt Jackson chronology
Milt Jackson and the Hip String Quartet (1968)	That's the Way It Is (1970)	Just the Way It Had to Be (1970)

That's the Way It Is is a live album by American jazz vibraphonist Milt Jackson featuring performances recorded at Shelly's Manne Hole in 1969 for the Impulse! label.

== Reception ==
The Allmusic review awarded the album 3 stars.".

Professional ratings
Review scores
Source	Rating
Allmusic	3/5 stars

== Track listing ==
1. "Frankie and Johnny" (Traditional) - 6:43
2. "Here's That Rainy Day" (Johnny Burke, Jimmy Van Heusen) - 7:45
3. "Wheelin' and Dealin'" (Teddy Edwards) - 4:32
4. "Blues In Bassment" (Ray Brown) - 7:15
5. "Tenderly" (Walter Gross, Jack Lawrence) - 8:44
6. "That's The Way It Is" (Monty Alexander) - 7:22

- Recorded at Shelly's Manne-Hole in Hollywood, California on August 1 & 2, 1969

== Personnel ==
- Milt Jackson – vibes
- Teddy Edwards – tenor saxophone
- Monty Alexander – piano
- Ray Brown – bass
- Dick Berk – drums
