= Diane (album) =

Studio album by Chet Baker, Paul Bley
- Released: 1985
- Recorded: February 28, 1985; Sound Track Studios, Copenhagen
- Genre: Jazz
- Length: 46:37 (LP), 51:33 (CD)
- Label: SteepleChase SCS 1207
- Producer: Nils Winther

Paul Bley chronology
Questions (1985)	Diane (1985)	Hot (1985)

Professional ratings
Review scores
Source	Rating
AllMusic	2.5/5 stars
The Penguin Guide to Jazz Recordings	3.5/4 stars

Diane is an album by trumpeter Chet Baker and pianist Paul Bley recorded in Denmark in 1985 and released on the SteepleChase label.

== Critical reception ==
The authors of The Penguin Guide to Jazz Recordings describe Bley as an ideal duo partner for Baker, and say that only a “murky sound” prevented the album receiving a four star rating.

== Track listing ==
1. "If I Should Lose You" (Ralph Rainger, Leo Robin) - 7:16
2. "You Go to My Head" (J. Fred Coots, Haven Gillespie) - 7:03
3. "How Deep Is the Ocean?" (Irving Berlin) - 5:17
4. "Pent-Up House" (Sonny Rollins) - 3:55
5. "Ev'ry Time We Say Goodbye" (Cole Porter) - 7:52
6. "Diane" (Lew Pollack, Ernö Rapée) - 5:31
7. "Skidadidlin'" (Chet Baker) - 4:16
8. "Little Girl Blue" (Lorenz Hart, Richard Rodgers) - 5:27 (LP), 10:23 (CD)

== Personnel ==
- Chet Baker - trumpet, vocals (track 2)
- Paul Bley - piano
