= The Big 3 (Milt Jackson album) =

Studio album by Milt Jackson, Joe Pass and Ray Brown
- Released: 1975
- Recorded: August 25, 1975
- Studio: Cherokee Recording Studio
- Genre: Jazz
- Length: 43:43
- Label: Pablo
- Producer: Norman Granz

Milt Jackson chronology
| The Milt Jackson Big 4 (1975) | The Big 3 (1975) | Feelings (1976) |

Ray Brown chronology
| This One's for Blanton! (1973) | The Big 3 (1975) | Brown's Bag (1976) |

The Big 3 is an album by vibraphonist Milt Jackson, guitarist Joe Pass and bassist Ray Brown recorded in 1975 and released on the Pablo label.

== Reception ==
The AllMusic review by Scott Yanow stated, "These three masterful players recorded together in many settings during the Pablo years, but only this once as a trio. The colorful repertoire acts as a device for the musicians to construct some brilliant bop-based solos".

Professional ratings
Review scores
| Source | Rating |
|---|---|
| AllMusic | 5/5 stars |
| The Penguin Guide to Jazz Recordings | 3/4 stars |

== Track listing ==
1. "The Pink Panther" (Henry Mancini) - 5:52
2. "Nuages" (Django Reinhardt) - 7:26
3. "Blue Bossa" (Kenny Dorham) - 5:03
4. "Come Sunday" (Duke Ellington) - 3:12
5. "Wave" (Antonio Carlos Jobim) - 6:50
6. "Moonglow" (Eddie DeLange, Will Hudson, Irving Mills) - 4:57
7. "You Stepped Out of a Dream" (Nacio Herb Brown, Gus Kahn) - 3:58
8. "Blues for Sammy" (Milt Jackson) - 6:25

- Recorded in Los Angeles, California on August 25, 1975 by Angel Balestier

== Personnel ==
- Milt Jackson – vibes
- Joe Pass – guitar
- Ray Brown – bass
