= If I Should Lose You =

1936 song by Ralph Rainger and Leo Robin

"If I Should Lose You" by Julien Grandgagnage on altosax.

"If I Should Lose You" is a song composed by Ralph Rainger, with lyrics by Leo Robin. It was introduced in the 1936 film Rose of the Rancho.

== Notable recordings ==
- Geri Allen – Twenty One (1994)
- Chet Atkins – Stay Tuned (1985)
- Chet Baker – Diane (1985)
- Georgia Brown − Georgia Brown (1963)
- Betty Carter − Feed the Fire (1993)
- June Christy − Day Dreams (1995), Cool Christy (2002)
- Chick Corea and Stefano Bollani – Orvieto (2010)
- Fabien Degryse − Fingerswinging (2011)
- Dena DeRose − I Can See Clearly Now (2000)
- Jane Ira Bloom – Slalom (1988)
- Lou Donaldson – Sweet Poppa Lou (1981)
- Aretha Franklin – Unforgettable: A Tribute to Dinah Washington (1964)
- The Four Freshmen − Voices in Latin (1958)
- Grant Green – Born to be Blue (1962)
- Al Haig − Al Haig Trio (1954)
- Jan Harbeck Quartet − In the Still of the Night (2008)
- Dick Haymes − The Complete Capitol Collection (2006), Moondreams (1955)
- Richard Himber and His Orchestra with vocals by Stuart Allen (1936)
- Shirley Horn – Embers and Ashes (1959)
- Milt Jackson, Grady Tate, Ray Brown and Oscar Peterson − Ain't But a Few of Us Left (1981)
- Keith Jarrett − Standards, Vol.2 (1985)
- Isham Jones and His Orchestra with vocal by Woody Herman (1935)
- Peggy Lee − The Man I Love (1957)
- Booker Little – Booker Little and Friend (1961)
- Julie London − Sophisticated Lady (1962)
- Freddy Martin and His Orchestra (1935)
- Carmen McRae and George Shearing – Two for the Road (1980)
- Hank Mobley − Soul Station (1960)
- The Montgomery Brothers − Groove Yard (1961)
- Mulgrew Miller − Live at the Kennedy Center, Vol. 1 (2006)
- Charlie Parker − Charlie Parker with Strings (1950)
- Oscar Peterson – Tracks (1970)
- Vi Redd – Bird Call (1962)
- Harry Richman (1936)
- Kurt Rosenwinkel − Deep Song (2005)
- Nina Simone − A Single Woman (1993), Wild is the Wind (1966)
- Frank Sinatra − L.A. Is My Lady (1984)
- Jimmy Smith – Crazy! Baby (1960)
- Keely Smith − What Kind of Fool Am I? (1962)
- Sonny Stitt – Sonny Stitt Plays (1955)
- Bobby Timmons – From the Bottom (1964)
- McCoy Tyner – Afro Blue (2007)
- Dinah Washington – Tears and Laughter (1962)
