= Feelings (Milt Jackson album) =

Studio album by Milt Jackson and Strings
- Released: 1976
- Recorded: April 12–14, 1976
- Studio: RCA Recording Studios, Los Angeles, CA
- Genre: Jazz
- Length: 46:00
- Label: Pablo; 2310 774
- Producer: Norman Granz

Milt Jackson chronology
The Big 3 (1975)	Feelings (1976)	At The Kosei Nenkin (1977)

Feelings is an album by vibraphonist Milt Jackson accompanied by a string section that was recorded in 1976 and released by the Pablo label.

== Reception ==
Professional ratings
Review scores
Source	Rating
AllMusic	3/5 stars
The Penguin Guide to Jazz Recordings	2/4 stars

AllMusic reviewer Stewart Mason stated "1976's Feelings is an atypical set for Milt Jackson. Usually the epitome of cool jazz hipness, the title track finds the music's pre-eminent vibraphonist squandering his talents on Morris Albert's gloppy pop hit to the accompaniment of an uninspired, violin-heavy string section. Both concept and execution are dire ... The remainder of the album picks up significantly from that abysmal beginning; producer Norman Granz and arranger Jimmy Jones wisely keep the orchestra well in the background, adding the occasional lush, Ellington-like flourish at the beginnings and endings of the tunes but otherwise staying out of the way of Jackson's sublimely melodic vibes ... It's not the average Milt Jackson album, but after a potentially devastating start, Feelings turns out not to be half bad".

== Track listing ==
1. "Feelings" (Morris Albert) – 6:22
2. "Come-tome" (Milt Jackson) – 4:42
3. "Trouble Is a Man" (Alec Wilder) – 5:08
4. "Moody Blue" (Gerald Wilson) – 3:21
5. "The Day It Rained" (Djalma Ferreira, Ray Gilbert) – 3:41
6. "My Kind of Trouble Is You" (Benny Carter, Paul Vandervoort II) – 5:12
7. "If You Went Away" (Marcos Valle) – 3:59
8. "Tears" (Eumir Deodato) – 3:20
9. "Blues For Edith" (Milt Jackson) – 4:50
10. "You Don't Know What Love Is" (Gene de Paul, Don Raye) – 5:07

== Personnel ==
- Milt Jackson – vibraphone
- Hubert Laws – flute
- Jerome Richardson – flute, alto flute
- Tommy Flanagan – piano
- Dennis Budimir – guitar
- Ray Brown – bass
- Jimmie Smith – drums
- Paulinho da Costa – percussion
- Arnold Belnick, Herman Clebanoff, Marcia Van Dyke, Dave Frisina, Jennifer Geller, Al Harshman, Karen Jones, Jacob Krachmalnick, Bernard Kundell, Erno Neufeld, Stanley Plummer, Ralph Schaeffer, Charles Veal, Jerry Vinci – violin
- Rollice Dale, David Schwartz – viola
- Ronald Cooper, Ray Kramer – cello
- Catherine Gotthoffer – harp
- Jimmy Jones – arranger, conductor
