= Ali Ryerson =

American flutist (born 1952)

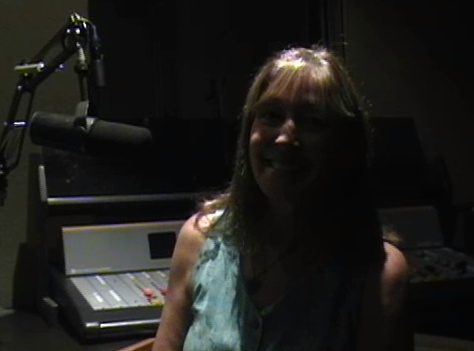
- Ali Ryerson in the Jazz 88 Studios with Vince Outlaw during the Jazz Live Interview

Background information
- Born: 21 October 1952 (age 73); New York City
- Genres: Jazz
- Occupation: Musician
- Instrument: Flute
- Labels: Red Baron, Concord Jazz, Capri
- Website: www.aliryerson.com

Ali Ryerson (born 21 October 1952 in New York City) is a flutist with a background in both classical and jazz, as well as being an instructor. She has performed and toured worldwide with a wide range of artists including Billy Taylor, Kenny Barron, Stephane Grappelli, Frank Wess, Red Rodney, Laurindo Almeida, Art Farmer, Maxine Sullivan, Roy Haynes, and (as principal flutist with the Monterey Bay Symphony) with Luciano Pavarotti. She has also released numerous albums under her own name, as well as duo recordings with noted guitarist Joe Beck.

Ryerson has toured the U.S., Canada, Europe, Japan and Africa, and has performed in many major jazz festivals, including the Monterey Jazz Festival, the JVC Jazz Festival in New York, Cork Jazz Festival, Guinness Festival in Scotland, Edinburgh Festival in Scotland, and Carnegie Hall.

== Discography ==
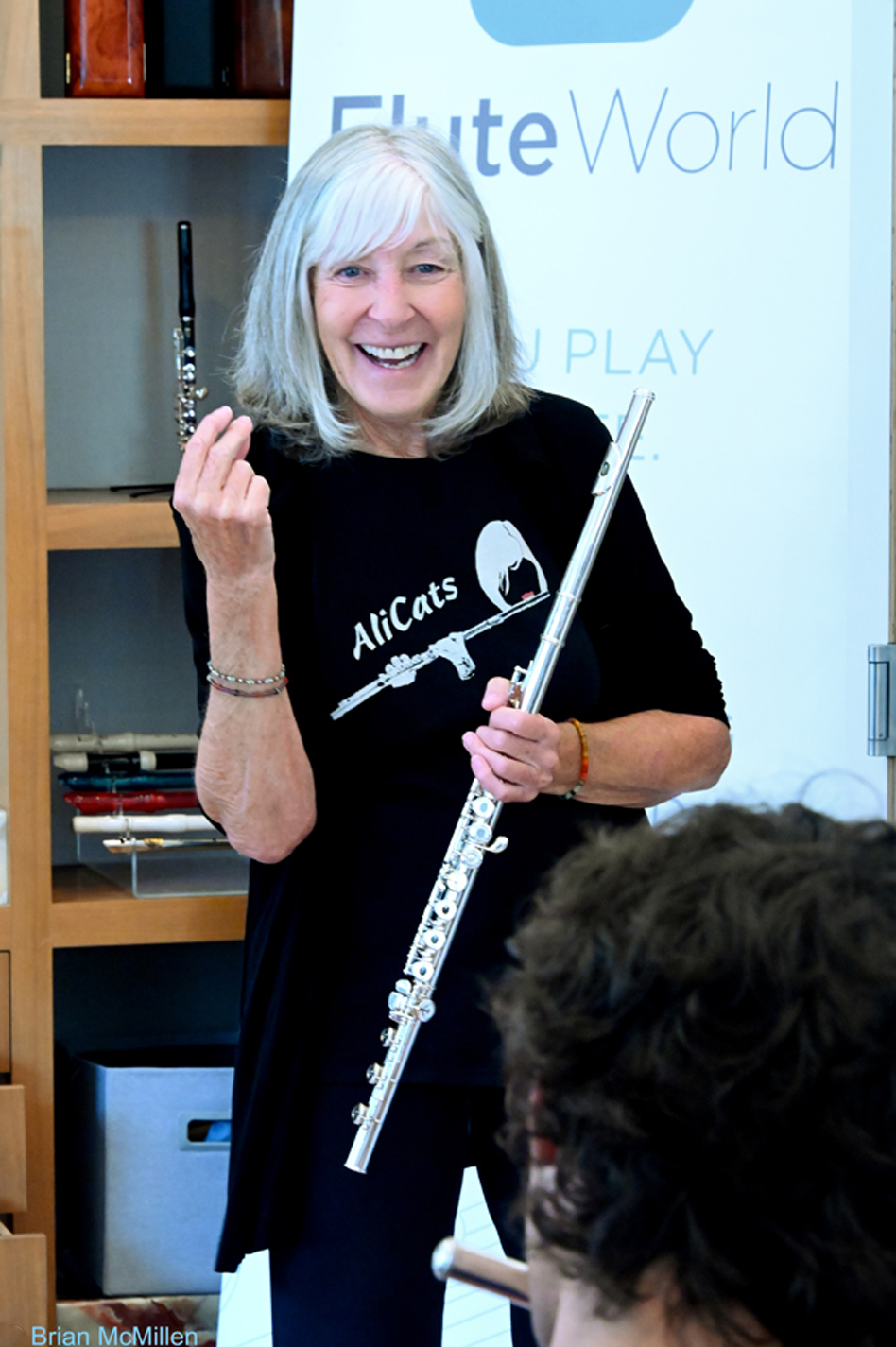
Ali Ryerson clinic at Flute World, San Francisco CA 9/13/25

- Charles Loos/Ali Ryerson (European Music, 1988)
- Vagabondages (Igloo, 1991)
- Blue Flute (Red Baron, 1992)
- I'll Be Back (Red Baron, 1993)
- Portraits in Silver (Concord Jazz, 1995)
- In Her Own Sweet Way (Concord Jazz, 1996)
- Brasil: Quiet Devotion (Concord Picante, 1997)
- Alto with Joe Beck (DMP, 1997)
- Django with Joe Beck (DMP, 2001)
- Music from West Side Story (Stanza USA, 2003)
- First Date with Flutology (Capri, 2003)
- Soul Quest with Steve Rudolph (Pact, 2005)
- Jammin' at the Jazz Corner (Sweet Jazz, 2008)
- Con Brio! (ACR, 2011)
- Game Changer (Capri, 2013)
- Best of both worlds. Marc Matthys European Quartet with Ali Ryerson and Peter Verhoyen. (Alley Cats, 2014)
- The Ali Ryerson Quartet (ACR, 2026)
