= Atsuko Hashimoto =

Japanese jazz musician

Atsuko Hashimoto 橋本有津子
- Origin: Osaka, Japan
- Genres: Mainstream jazz
- Occupation: Musician
- Instrument: Organ
- Labels: Capri Records; Azica; Thousand Days; YS organ-ize
- Website: prolinea-net.com/atsukohashimoto

Atsuko Hashimoto (橋本有津子, はしもとあつこ), is a jazz musician from Osaka, Japan, who plays Hammond B-3 electronic organ and has performed in Japan and the United States. To date, she has recorded five albums of organ trio and organ quartet jazz.

== Career ==
Hashimoto first played the organ at the age of four, beginning with popular songs and jazz standards. Before choosing to specialize in jazz she trained in classical music for several years. At 18, she began working for Hammond Japan demonstrating organs and giving lessons as a Hammond-certified instructor.

In 1991, Hashimoto became the house organ player at the Don Shop in Osaka. The next year, she fronted her own organ quartet at the Osaka Jazz Festival and Naniwa Arts Festival. These appearances led to collaborations with Makoto Ozone and Terumasa Hino.

In 1999, Hashimoto debuted in the US, playing at clubs in New Orleans as well as Jazz at Pearl's in San Francisco, where she performed with Bruce Forman on guitar and Vince Lateano on drums. In 2000, she toured Japan with "Brother" Jack McDuff and his band, and in September that year shared the bill with Dr. Lonnie Smith at Blue Note Osaka. 2001 saw Atsuko return to California, playing at the San Jose Jazz Festival, The Baked Potato in Studio City and the Kuumbwa Jazz Center in Santa Cruz. She played at the 2001 Jazz Organ Summit with Yutaka Hashimoto and Fukushi Tainaka.

In 2002, while he was touring Japan with Diana Krall, Jeff Hamilton first heard from other musicians about the electrifying Atsuko Hashimoto "holding court" at the Don Shop, enthralling audiences while playing jazz after hours. Following his set in Osaka, Hamilton went to hear her play and after a few songs, he asked and was invited to sit in with her on stage for a 'jam'. Hamilton has said the experience resolved in him a desire to tour and record with Hashimoto. Hashimoto and Hamilton have recorded two CDs together, touring to support the recordings.

In 2003, at the 40th Naniwa Arts Festival in Osaka, Atsuko received the Shoji Nakayama Jazz Award, the Progressive Musician's Prize, and awards from both the governor of Osaka Prefecture and the mayor of the city of Osaka.

Club Manhattan in Osaka hosted Atsuko Hashimoto in 2004.

September 2006, was a very busy month for the artist. September 5, Atsuko and Yutaka Hashimoto recorded at Capitol Studios in Los Angeles accompanied by Jeff Hamilton. Houston Person swapped in for Yutaka Hashimoto on a second collection of songs. The extended recording session resulted in both the Thousand Days Records album Time After Time, released March 5, 2008 and the Azica Records album Introducing Atsuko Hashimoto, released February 12, 2008. The next day, on September 6, Atsuko Hashimoto, Jeff Hamilton and Houston Person performed at San Diego Museum of Art where they received a standing ovation. On September 8, Hashimoto appeared at the White Noise Music Festival in Sacramento. On September 10, 2006 at the Jazzschool in Berkeley, Atsuko and Yutaka Hashimoto were joined by Juasa Kanoh on drums. Late in September, Atsuko and Yutaka Hashimoto were invited to the 12th West Coast Jazz Party in Irvine, California. There Mrs. Hashimoto played two sets with Jeff Hamilton on drums: one with Yutaka Hashimoto and Ron Eschete trading licks on guitar and one with Houston Person on tenor saxophone—the latter group billed as "Organ Magic Trio." They also played at the LAX Crowne Plaza Hotel's Brasserie Lounge in Los Angeles and Steamers Jazz Club in Fullerton.

At the 50th Monterey Jazz Festival in September 2007, Atsuko Hashimoto took part in the "Hammond B-3 Blowout" featuring the Joey DeFrancesco Trio and the Atsuko Hashimoto Trio. Her trio included Houston Person and Jeff Hamilton; the two trios were said to "blow out the Night Club." Prior to the Monterey date, Hashimoto appeared at Centrum (also known as Port Townsend Jazz Festival), Steamers Jazz Club, the Brasserie Lounge and the Pasadena Jazz Institute where Ron Eschete covered guitar.

At the 8th Newport Beach Jazz Party (a sister event to the West Coast Jazz Party) on February 17, 2008 Atsuko Hashimoto, Jeff Hamilton and Houston Person played a set billed as "International Power Trio". The next day, the Atsuko Hashimoto Organ Trio played Pasadena Jazz Institute, featuring Yutaka Hashimoto on guitar and Jeff Hamilton on drums. On February 22, 2008 Atsuko Hashimoto and Jeff Hamilton joined tenor saxophonist Red Holloway at the Lionel Hampton Jazz Festival at the University of Idaho.

== Musical style ==
Atsuko Hashimoto plays primarily jazz standards, augmenting them with solos. YS organ-ize Records, her first label, has described her playing as "pre-Jimmy Smith era, some Wild Bill Davis, some Milt Buckner, some Jackie Davis". Mrs. Hashimoto plays Hammond B-3 through one or two Leslie speakers. She often wears gloves or tapes her fingers before playing in order to enable smooth, fast glissandi without injury.

== Personal life ==
In the early 1990s, Atsuko Hashimoto married Yutaka, a skilled jazz guitarist. The couple lives in Osaka when they aren't touring.

Mrs. Hashimoto travels with an interpreter when outside Japan.

== Discography ==
- Until the Sun Comes Up (Capri, 2011) featuring Jeff Hamilton (drums), Graham Dechter (guitar).
  - 1. All Or Nothing At All (6:05)
  - 2. Soul Station (5:44)
  - 3. So In Love (5:05)
  - 4. Moon River (5:22)
  - 5. What A Wonderful World (6:06)
  - 6. Blues For Naka (6:19)
  - 7. You Are My Sunshine (4:17)
  - 8. Cherry (6:28)
  - 9. Yours Is My Heart Alone (4:18)
  - 10. The Good Life (5:46)
  - 11. Hallelujah, I Love Her So (4:56)
- Introducing Atsuko Hashimoto (Azica, 2008) featuring Jeff Hamilton (drums), Houston Person (tenor sax).
  - 1. Sunny (6:50) by Bobby Hebb
  - 2. Blue Moon (6:47) by Richard Rodgers & Lorenz Hart
  - 3. Only Trust Your Heart (8:18) by Sammy Cahn & Benny Carter
  - 4. Don't Get Around Much Anymore (7:40) by Duke Ellington
  - 5. Black Velvet (6:44) by Illinois Jacquet & Jimmy Mundy
  - 6. My Babe (4:33) Traditional
  - 7. God Bless The Child (7:16) by Arthur Herzog Jr. & Billie Holiday
  - 8. Hammer Time (5:34) by Houston Person
  - 9. That's All (6:21) by Alan Brandt & Bob Heymes
  - 10. Sunny (Reprise) (2:42) by Bobby Hebb
- Time After Time (Thousand Days Records, 2008) with Yutaka Hashimoto (guitar), Jeff Hamilton (drums).
  - 1. Time After Time
  - 2. Just One Of Those Things
  - 3. I've Never Been In Love Before
  - 4. Max
  - 5. Estate
  - 6. The End Of A Love Affair
  - 7. Shiny Stockings
  - 8. Love For Sale
  - 9. Please Send Me Someone To Love
  - 10. Little Suede Shoes
  - 11. Summertime
- Songs We Love (Thousand Days Records, 2005) with Yutaka Hashimoto (guitar), Juasa Kanoh (drums), plus voices: Harvey Thompson, Toni Scruggs and Elijah Levi.
  - 1. Ladybug
  - 2. Bye Bye Blackbird
  - 3. My Ship
  - 4. You Don't Know What Love Is
  - 5. Misty
  - 6. The Song Is You
  - 7. Nature Boy
  - 8. Ruggin' The Blues
  - 9. What's Going On
  - 10. The More I See You
  - 11. Will You Still Love Me Tomorrow
  - 12. God Bless The child
  - 13. Stormy Monday
- Full Organ (self-produced, recorded January 25, 2003, at Osaka Municipal Space of Arts) with Yutaka Hashimoto (guitar), Jimmie Smith (drums).
  - 1. Minor Somethin'
  - 2. Cherokee
  - 3. Time After Time
  - 4. Go See Dr. Lonnie
  - 5. I'm Gonna Sit Right Down And Write Myself A Letter
  - 6. Groove Thang
  - 7. La Luna De Jubio
  - 8. Blues For Jimmy
  - 9. The Chase
  - 10. Everyday I Have The Blues
- Jazz Organ Tribute (YS organ-ize Records, recorded July 1999, at Le Club Jazz, Kyoto, Japan) with Yutaka Hashimoto (guitar), Tatsuhiko Takeda (drums) plus Jin Mitsuda (percussion). This album also features the Midori Ono Trio.
  - 1. That's All (Atsuko Hashimoto Trio+1)
  - 2. Vera Cruz (Atsuko Hashimoto Trio+1)
  - 3. Gumbo (Atsuko Hashimoto Trio+1)
  - 4. Little Girl Blue (Atsuko Hashimoto Trio+1)
  - 5. Little Latin Chat (Atsuko Hashimoto Trio+1)
  - 6. Comin' Home Baby (Midori Ono Trio)
  - 7. In A Mellow Tone (Midori Ono Trio)
  - 8. Old Folks (Midori Ono Trio)
  - 9. Silver's Serenade (Midori Ono Trio)
  - 10. Moment's Notice (Midori Ono Trio)

== See also ==
- Hammond organ
- Organ trio
