= This Is Ray Brown =

Studio album by Ray Brown
- Released: 1958
- Recorded: February 27, 28, 1958
- Genre: Jazz
- Length: 32:18
- Label: Verve
- Producer: Norman Granz

Ray Brown chronology
Bass Hit! (1956)	This Is Ray Brown (1958)	Jazz Cello (1960)

Professional ratings
Review scores
Source	Rating
AllMusic	2/5 stars
The Penguin Guide to Jazz Recordings	3/4 stars

This Is Ray Brown is a 1958 studio album by American jazz double bass player Ray Brown.

== Track listing ==
1. "Bric-A-Brac" (Ray Brown) – 5:33
2. "Upstairs Blues" (Brown) – 6:40
3. "(Back Home Again in) Indiana" (James F. Hanley, Ballard MacDonald) – 4:38
4. "The Nearness of You" (Hoagy Carmichael, Ned Washington) – 6:16
5. "Take the "A" Train" (Billy Strayhorn) – 8:06
6. "Cool Walk" (Brown) – 6:31
7. "Jim" (Caesar Petrillo, Milton Samuels, Nelson Shawn) – 9:00

== Personnel ==
=== Performance ===
- Ray Brown – double bass
- Jerome Richardson – flute
- Oscar Peterson – organ, piano
- Herb Ellis – guitar
- Osie Johnson – drums
