= Old Friends (André Previn album) =

Live album by André Previn
- Released: January 28, 1992
- Recorded: August 24, 1991
- Venue: Copley Symphony Hall, San Diego
- Genre: Jazz
- Length: 70:29
- Label: Telarc
- Producer: Elaine Martone, Robert Woods

André Previn chronology
Uptown (1990)	Old Friends (1992)	Kiri Sidetracks: The Jazz Album (1992)

Professional ratings
Review scores
Source	Rating
The Penguin Guide to Jazz Recordings	2.5/4 stars

Old Friends is a 1992 jazz live album by pianist André Previn.

== Track listing ==
1. "But Not For Me" (George Gershwin, Ira Gershwin) - 7:40
2. "Stars Fell on Alabama" (Frank Perkins, Mitchell Parish) - 5:46
3. "Stompin' at the Savoy" (Benny Goodman, Edgar Sampson) - 6:30
4. "Medley: Darn That Dream / Here's That Rainy Day / Polka Dots and Moonbeams" (Jimmy Van Heusen, Eddie DeLange / Jimmy Van Heusen, Sammy Cahn / Jimmy Van Heusen, Johnny Burke) - 9:09
5. "One O'Clock Jump" (Count Basie) - 6:24
6. "Topsy" (Eddie Duran, Edgar Battle) - 4:56
7. "Medley: The Bad and the Beautiful, Laura" (David Raksin) - 5:40
8. "Moonsweeper Blues" (André Previn) - 8:37
9. "Over The Rainbow" (E.Y. "Yip" Harburg, Harold Arlen) - 5:13
10. "Satin Doll" (Billy Strayhorn, Duke Ellington, Johnny Mercer) - 6:22
11. "Sweet Georgia Brown" (Ben Bernie, Kenneth Casey, Maceo Pinkard) - 4:05

== Personnel ==
- André Previn - piano
- Mundell Lowe - guitar
- Ray Brown - double bass
