= Fred Hess =

American musician

Fred Hess (September 3, 1944, Abington, Pennsylvania – October 27, 2018) was an American jazz tenor saxophonist.

== Formative years ==
Born in Abington Township, Montgomery County, Pennsylvania on September 3, 1944, Fred Hess was raised in New Jersey and studied at Trenton State College. He also studied composition at, and performed in, The Festival at Sandpoint in 1990.

His early experiences included studies with saxophonist Phil Woods, performances with bandleader Fred Waring, and composing music for the world premiere of a Sam Shepard play.

== Career ==
As a composer, Hess's influences encompass avant-garde classical sources, as well as Anthony Braxton and the members of the AACM. He moved to Boulder, Colorado, in 1981, where he founded the Boulder Creative Music Ensemble. He then completed further studies at the University of Colorado, Boulder, taking his doctorate in composition in 1991. He recorded his first albums as a leader in the early 1990s, and was the director of music composition at Metro State College in Denver, Colorado.

In addition to his own projects as a leader (BCME and The Fred Hess Group), he was the founding director of Denver's Creative Music Works Orchestra and was a member of drummer Ginger Baker's Denver Jazz Quintet, as well as ensembles led by trumpeter Ron Miles. His most recent performing group was the Fred Hess Big Band.

Hess's playing was influenced by Lester Young, John Coltrane, the Association for the Advancement of Creative Musicians, and Eric Dolphy. Among his releases is Extended Family, issued in 2003 on Tapestry Records.

== Death ==
Hess died at the age of seventy-four on October 27, 2018.

== Discography ==
- Sweet Thunder (Capri, 1991)
- You Know I Care (Capri, 1994)
- Faith (Cadence Jazz, 2000)
- Exposed (CIMP, 2001)
- Right at Home (Tapestry, 2002)
- Between the Lines (Tapestry, 2003)
- Ninth Street Park (Tapestry, 2003)
- Extended Family (Tapestry, 2003)
- Long and Short of It (Tapestry, 2004)
- Crossed Paths (Tapestry, 2005)
- How Bout Now (Tapestry, 2006)
- In the Grotto (Alison, 2007)
- Single Moment (Alison, 2008)
- Hold On Fred Hess Big Band (Dazzle), 2009)
- Into the Open Fred Hess Big Band (Alison, 2010)
- Speak Fred Hess Big Band (Alison, 2012)
