= Bass Hit! =

Studio album by Ray Brown
- Released: 1957
- Recorded: November 21, 23, 1956
- Genre: Jazz
- Length: 32:18
- Label: Verve
- Producer: Norman Granz

Ray Brown chronology
Bass Hit! (1957)	This Is Ray Brown (1958)

Professional ratings
Review scores
Source	Rating
Allmusic	4/5 stars

Bass Hit! is a 1956 album by Ray Brown, his first album as a leader. It was produced by Norman Granz. "Solo for Unaccompanied Bass" contains whispered singing from 1:18 to 1:25.

== Track listing ==
1. "Bass Introduction" / "Blues for Sylvia" (Ray Brown / Brown, Marty Paich) – 5:04
2. "All of You" (Cole Porter) – 4:00
3. "Everything I Have Is Yours" (Harold Adamson, Burton Lane) – 4:28
4. "Will You Still Be Mine?" (Tom Adair, Matt Dennis) – 3:42
5. "Little Toe" (Brown) – 4:52
6. "Alone Together" (Howard Dietz, Arthur Schwartz) – 4:46
7. "Solo for Unaccompanied Bass" (Brown) – 2:30
8. "My Foolish Heart" (Ned Washington, Victor Young) – 4:09
9. "Blues for Lorraine" / "Bass Conclusion" (Brown, Paich / Brown) – 5:36

Bonus tracks on CD reissue in 1999:

10. "After You've Gone Medley" (False Start/Breakdown/False Start/Complete Take) (Henry Creamer, Turner Layton) – 2:50
11. "After You've Gone" (Complete Take) – 4:49
12. "After You've Gone Medley" (False Start/Breakdown/Breakdown/Complete Take) – 3:01
13. "After You've Gone" (Complete Take) – 2:44

== Personnel ==
=== Performance ===
- Ray Brown – double bass
- Pete Candoli – trumpet
- Harry Edison - trumpet
- Herbie Harper – trombone
- Jack DuLong – alto saxophone
- Jimmy Giuffre – clarinet, tenor saxophone
- Bill Holman – tenor saxophone
- Jimmy Rowles – piano
- Herb Ellis – guitar
- Mel Lewis – drums
- Marty Paich – arranger, conductor
