= Milt Jackson and the Hip String Quartet =

Studio album by Milt Jackson
- Released: 1968
- Recorded: May 9 and June 3 & 17, 1968
- Studio: A&R Studios, NYC
- Genre: Jazz
- Length: 31:06
- Label: Verve
- Producer: Esmond Edwards

Milt Jackson chronology
Under the Jasmin Tree (1968)	Milt Jackson and the Hip String Quartet (1968)	That's the Way It Is (1970)

Milt Jackson and the Hip String Quartet is an album by vibraphonist Milt Jackson accompanied by a string quartet arranged and conducted by Tom McIntosh that was recorded in 1968 and released on the Verve label.

== Reception ==
The Allmusic review awarded the album three out of five stars.

Professional ratings
Review scores
Source	Rating
Allmusic	3/5 stars

== Track listing ==
1. "You Got to Pay When the Deal Goes Down" (Tom McIntosh) - 3:28
2. "The Morning After" (Bernard Ebbinghouse) - 3:30
3. "For All We Know" (J. Fred Coots, Sam M. Lewis) - 3:29
4. "A Walkin' Thing" (Benny Carter) - 5:33
5. "In Walked Bud" (Thelonious Monk) - 3:37
6. "A Little Too Much" (Mike Appel, Don Henny) - 3:46
7. "Bags and Strings" (Milt Jackson) - 3:30
8. "New Rhumba" (Ahmad Jamal) - 4:13

- Recorded on May 9, 1968 (track eight), June 3, 1968 (tracks four and seven) and June 17, 1968 (tracks one to three, five and six)

== Personnel ==
- Milt Jackson – vibes
- Tom McIntosh – arranger, conductor
- Hubert Laws – flute (tracks 4, 7–8)
- James Moody – tenor saxophone, flute (tracks 1–3, 5–6)
- Sanford Allen – violin
- Alfred Brown – viola
- Sidney Edwards (tracks 1–3, 5–6), Ronald Lipscomb, Kermit Moore (tracks 4, 7–8) – cello
- Cedar Walton – piano
- Ron Carter (tracks 4, 7–8), Bob Cranshaw (tracks 1–3, 5–6) – bass
- Mickey Roker (tracks 1–3, 5–6, 8), Grady Tate (tracks 4, 7) – drums
