= This One's for Blanton! =

Studio album by Duke Ellington & Ray Brown
- Released: 1973
- Recorded: December 5, 1972
- Genre: Jazz
- Length: 39:25
- Label: Pablo
- Producer: Norman Granz

Duke Ellington chronology
The Ellington Suites (1972)	This One's for Blanton! (1973)	Up in Duke’s Workshop (1969-73)

Ray Brown chronology
Memphis Jackson (1970)	This One's for Blanton! (1973)	The Big 3 (1975)

This One's for Blanton! is a studio album by the American pianist, composer and bandleader Duke Ellington, duetting with Ray Brown, recorded in December 1972 and released on the Pablo label.

The title refers to early Duke Ellington collaborator and influential, yet short-lived double bass player Jimmy Blanton.

== Reception ==
The AllMusic review by Scott Yanow called the album "delightful and often-playful music".

Professional ratings
Review scores
Source	Rating
AllMusic	4/5 stars
The Penguin Guide to Jazz Recordings	3/4 stars
The Rolling Stone Jazz Record Guide	5/5 stars
The Village Voice	A−

== Track listing ==
All compositions by Duke Ellington except as indicated

1. "Do Nothin' Till You Hear from Me" (Ellington, Bob Russell) – 5:36
2. "Pitter Panther Patter" – 3:06
3. "Things Ain't What They Used to Be" (Mercer Ellington) – 4:00
4. "Sophisticated Lady" (Ellington, Irving Mills, Mitchell Parish) – 5:30
5. "See See Rider" (traditional) – 3:07
6. "Fragmented Suite for Piano and Bass: First Movement" (Ray Brown, Ellington) – 4:51
7. "Fragmented Suite for Piano and Bass: Second Movement" (Brown, Ellington) – 5:11
8. "Fragmented Suite for Piano and Bass: Third Movement" (Brown, Ellington) – 3:40
9. "Fragmented Suite for Piano and Bass: Fourth Movement" (Brown, Ellington) – 4:58

- Recorded at United Recording Studios in Las Vegas, Nevada, on December 5, 1972.

== Personnel ==
- Duke Ellington – piano
- Ray Brown – bass
