= Bud Shank =

American saxophonist and flautist (1926–2009)

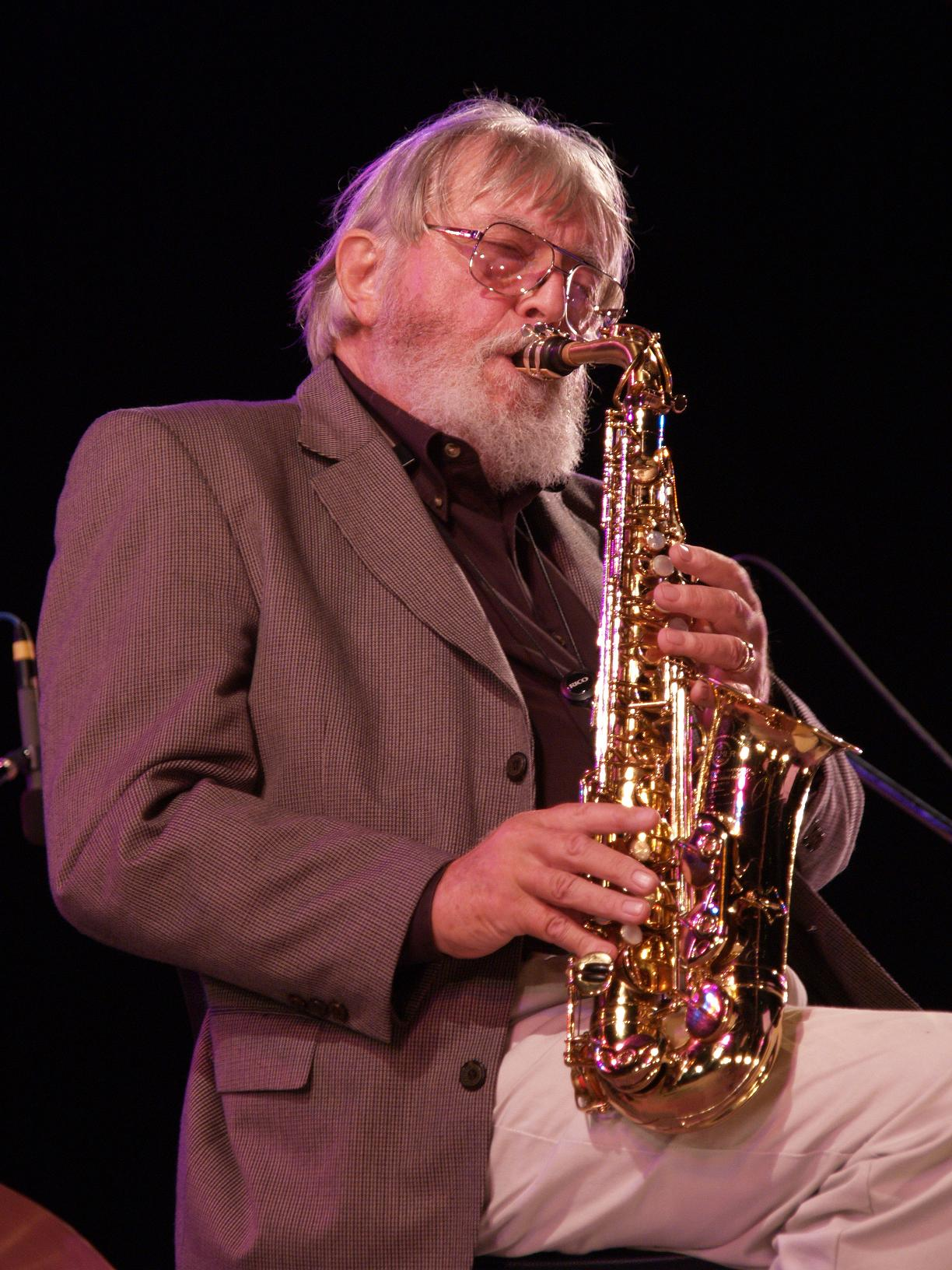
- Bud Shank in 2006

Background information
- Born: Clifford Everett Shank Jr. May 27, 1926; Dayton, Ohio, U.S.
- Died: April 2, 2009 (aged 82) Tucson, Arizona, U.S.
- Genres: Jazz
- Occupation: Musician
- Instruments: Alto saxophone, flute, tenor saxophone, baritone saxophone
- Years active: 1946–2009
- Website: www.budshankalto.com

Clifford Everett "Bud" Shank Jr. (May 27, 1926 – April 2, 2009) was an American alto saxophonist and flutist. He rose to prominence in the late 1940s into early 1950s playing lead alto and flute in Stan Kenton's Innovations in Modern Music Orchestra. In 1951, he left Kenton and worked as sideman in various small jazz combos, most notably Howard Rumsey's Lighthouse All-Stars, before forming his own group. He spent the 1960s as a first-call studio musician in Hollywood. In the 1970s and 1980s, he performed regularly with the L. A. Four. Shank ultimately abandoned the flute to focus exclusively on playing jazz on the alto saxophone in the late 1980s. He also recorded on tenor and baritone sax. His most famous recording is probably the version of "Harlem Nocturne" used as the theme song in Mickey Spillane's Mike Hammer. He is also known for the soundtrack recordings with his group to the surfing films of Bruce Brown in the late 1950s and early 1960s, and for the alto flute solo on the song "California Dreamin'" recorded by the Mamas & the Papas in 1965.

== Biography ==
Bud Shank was born in Dayton, Ohio, United States. He began playing the clarinet in Vandalia, Ohio, but switched to saxophone before attending the University of North Carolina. While at UNC, Shank was initiated into the Pi Kappa Alpha fraternity, but quit college in his third year. In 1946, he traveled to California and worked with Charlie Barnet before moving on to Kenton in 1949 and the West coast jazz scene. Shank, along with close associate Bob Cooper, who was integral for getting him into the Kenton band, went on to work together as sidemen with various projects in the 1950s, such as with Shorty Rogers, Maynard Ferguson, and Shelly Manne before joining Howard Rumsey's Lighthouse All-Stars in 1952.

He also had a strong interest in what might now be termed world music, playing Brazilian-influenced jazz with Laurindo Almeida in 1953 and 1954. The resulting album was a huge success for Shank, and he subsequently was named "New Star Alto" by DownBeat magazine's Annual Critics Poll, and "Arrival Of The Year" by Metronome Magazine in 1954. His tenure with the Lighthouse All-Stars was immediately successful and he further made a name for himself, particularly in a flute-oboe frontline combination with Bob Cooper. Shank left the All Stars in 1956 and formed his own quartet consisting of Claude Williamson, piano; Don Prell, bass; and Chuck Flores on drums. His work on flute that year saw him sweep all polls to be named America's number one jazz flute player, beating Herbie Mann in the Down Beat Annual Readers Poll's newly created flute category. In 1958, he became among the first American jazz musicians to record in Italy (his pianist Claude Williamson recorded an album there just a few days earlier), with an Italian jazz orchestra conducted by Ezio Leoni (aka Len Mercer), paving the way for Chet Baker and others who would follow Shank's tracks recording in Milan with Maestro Leoni. In 1958 and 1960, Shank provided the soundtracks for two Bruce Brown surf movies: Slippery When Wet and Barefoot Adventure. His world music collaborations continued in 1962, fusing jazz with Indian traditions in collaboration with Indian composer and sitar player Ravi Shankar. As traditional jazz work in clubs and on recording dates became scarce in the 1960s and 70s, Shank took to working as a studio musician in Hollywood.

In 1974, Shank joined with Ray Brown, Shelly Manne (replaced by Jeff Hamilton after 1977), and Laurindo Almeida to form the group the L.A. Four, who recorded and toured extensively through 1982. Shank helped to popularize both Latin-flavored and chamber jazz music, and as a musician's musician also performed with orchestras as diverse as the Royal Philharmonic, the New American Orchestra, the Gerald Wilson Big Band, Stan Kenton's Neophonic Orchestra, and Duke Ellington.

In 1989 Shank came together with many of his former Lighthouse All-Star bandmates to record "Jazz Invention", a 40th anniversary reunion concert recorded in Hermosa Beach. He recorded again with the reunited All-Stars in 1991 and 1992.

In 2005, he formed the Bud Shank Big Band in Los Angeles to celebrate the 40th anniversary of Stan Kenton's Neophonic Orchestra.

A documentary film about Shank, Bud Shank: Against the Tide (Portrait of a Jazz Legend), was produced and directed by Graham Carter and released by Jazzed Media as a DVD (with a companion CD) in 2008. The film has been awarded four indie film awards including an Aurora Awards Gold.

Shank died on April 2, 2009, of a pulmonary embolism at his home in Tucson, Arizona, one day after returning from San Diego, California, where he was recording a new album.
