= Isn't This a Lovely Day? =

1935 song by Fred Astaire

Song by Fred Astaire with Johnny Greene's Orchestra
- B-side: "Top Hat, White Tie and Tails"
- Published: 1935 Berlin Irving Music Corp
- Released: August 1935
- Recorded: June 27, 1935
- Studio: ARC Studios, New York City
- Genre: Jazz, Pop Vocal
- Label: Brunswick 7487
- Songwriter: Irving Berlin

Fred Astaire with Johnny Greene's Orchestra singles chronology
| "Cheek To Cheek" (1935) | "Isn't This a Lovely Day?" (1935) | "Let's Face The Music And Dance" (1936) |

"Isn't This a Lovely Day?" is a popular song written by Irving Berlin for the 1935 film Top Hat, where it was introduced by Fred Astaire in the scene where his and Ginger Rogers' characters are caught in a gazebo during a rainstorm. The lyric is an example of a song which turns a bad situation into a love song, a common style for Irving Berlin, as in "I've Got My Love to Keep Me Warm" and "Let's Have Another Cup of Coffee".

== Notable recordings ==
- Fred Astaire recorded the song on three occasions. His 1935 version was assessed as reaching the No. 3 spot in the charts of the day. In 1953, he included the song in his album The Astaire Story. His final recording was in 1975 and the song was included in the album The Golden Age Of Fred Astaire.
- Phil Ohman - his 1935 recording was assessed as reaching the No. 16 spot in the charts of the day.
- Ginger Rogers (1935)
- Billie Holiday - recorded August 25, 1955
- Ella Fitzgerald and Louis Armstrong on the 1956 Verve release Ella and Louis.
- Sarah Vaughan and Billy Eckstine for their 1957 album Sarah Vaughan and Billy Eckstine Sing the Best of Irving Berlin.
- Dick Haymes - included in his 1957 album Moondreams.
- Ella Fitzgerald - Ella Fitzgerald Sings the Irving Berlin Songbook (1958)
- Jeri Southern - included in the album Southern Breeze (1958)
- Petula Clark - (1961)
- Bing Crosby on the 1965 album Bing Crosby's Treasury - The Songs I Love
- Tony Bennett - Bennett/Berlin (1987)
- George Shearing - Breakin' Out (1987)
- Stacey Kent - Let Yourself Go: Celebrating Fred Astaire (2000)
- Helen Shapiro from her album Simply Shapiro (2000)
- Diana Krall - From This Moment On (2006)
- Seth MacFarlane - In Full Swing (2017)
