= The L.A. Four (band) =

American jazz band

The L.A. Four (or The L.A. 4) was a jazz quartet, formed in Los Angeles, California, in 1974, that performed until 1982.

Its members were guitarist Laurindo Almeida, saxophonist and flutist Bud Shank, bassist Ray Brown, and drummer Shelly Manne, replaced by Jeff Hamilton after 1977. They performed a mixture of straight-ahead jazz on the "cool" side, influenced by European Classical music, and bossa nova and samba (Almeida was born in Brazil). They recorded ten albums before disbanding. Chuck Flores was the group's original drummer but did not record with them.

The group toured Australia in 1975.

== Discography ==
- 1975: The L.A. Four Scores! (Concord Jazz) – recorded live at the Concord Summer Festival, July 27, 1974
- 1976: The L.A. Four (Concierto de Aranjuez) (Concord Jazz)
- 1976: Pavane pour une Infante Defunte (East Wind)
- 1977: Going Home (East Wind)
- 1978: Just Friends (Concord Jazz)
- 1978: Watch What Happens (Concord Jazz)
- 1979: Live at Montreux (Concord Jazz)
- 1980: Zaca (Concord Jazz)
- 1981: Montage (Concord Jazz)
- 1982: Executive Suite (Concord Jazz)
