= Uptown (André Previn album) =

Studio album by André Previn
- Released: August 22, 1990
- Genre: Jazz
- Length: 57:41
- Label: Telarc
- Producer: Elaine Martone, Robert Woods

André Previn chronology
After Hours (1989)	Uptown (1990)	Old Friends (1992)

Professional ratings
Review scores
Source	Rating
The Penguin Guide to Jazz Recordings	2.5/4 stars

Uptown is a 1990 jazz album by André Previn, Mundell Lowe and Ray Brown.

== Track listing ==
All tracks composed by Harold Arlen; except where noted.

1. "Between the Devil and the Deep Blue Sea" (4:42)
2. "A Sleepin' Bee" (5:13)
3. "Come Rain or Come Shine" (4:10)
4. "Stormy Weather" (4:33)
5. "Over The Rainbow" (4:36)
6. "Let's Fall in Love" (3:21)
7. "Day Dream / Prelude to a Kiss" (Billy Strayhorn, Duke Ellington, Irving Gordon, Irving Mills, John Latouche) (4:43)
8. "Good Queen Bess" (Johnny Hodges) (4:21)
9. "Things Ain't What They Used to Be" (Mercer Ellington, Ted Persons) (4:19)
10. "It Don't Mean a Thing (If It Ain't Got That Swing)" (Duke Ellington, Irving Mills) (3:05)
11. "Five O' Clock Whistle" (Gene Irwin, Josef Myrow, Kenny Gannon) (5:29)
12. "Come Sunday" (Duke Ellington) (4:11)
13. "C Jam Blues" (Duke Ellington) (4:51)

== Personnel ==
- André Previn - piano

with:

- Mundell Lowe - guitar
- Ray Brown - double bass

Technical

- Jack Renner - recording
