= After Hours (André Previn album) =

Studio album by André Previn
- Released: 1989
- Recorded: March 29, 1989
- Studio: Ambassador Auditorium, Pasadena, CA
- Genre: Jazz
- Length: 63:09
- Label: Telarc
- Producer: Robert Woods

André Previn chronology
Nice Work If You Can Get It (1983)	After Hours (1989)	Uptown (1990)

Professional ratings
Review scores
Source	Rating
The Penguin Guide to Jazz Recordings	3/4 stars

After Hours is 1989 studio album by the jazz pianist André Previn, accompanied by the double bassist Ray Brown and the guitarist Joe Pass.

== Track listing ==
No.	Title	Writer(s)	Length
1.	"There Will Never Be Another You"	Harry Warren, Mack Gordon	6:04
2.	"I Only Have Eyes for You"	Warren, Al Dubin	4:50
3.	"What Am I Here for"	Duke Ellington, Frankie Laine	6:10
4.	"Limehouse Blues"	Philip Braham, Douglas Furber	6:56
5.	"All the Things You Are"	Jerome Kern, Oscar Hammerstein II	5:41
6.	"Honeysuckle Rose"	Andy Razaf, Fats Waller	5:39
7.	"I Got It Bad (and That Ain't Good)"	Ellington, Paul Francis Webster	6:07
8.	"Smoke Gets In Your Eyes"	Kern, Otto Harbach	6:09
9.	"Cotton Tail"	Ellington	4:09
10.	"Laura"	Johnny Mercer, David Raksin	5:56
11.	"One for Bunz"	traditional	5:42
Total length:			63:09

== Personnel ==
- André Previn – piano
- Joe Pass – guitar
- Ray Brown – double bass

=== Production ===
- Recording Engineer – Jack Renner
- Producer – Robert Woods
