= How Deep Is the Ocean? =

1932 song written and composed by Irving Berlin

"How Deep Is the Ocean?" is a popular song written by Irving Berlin in 1932. The song was developed from an earlier Berlin song "To My Mammy" which was sung by Al Jolson in his film Mammy (1930). In the earlier song, the lyrics include the questions "How deep is the ocean? / How high is the sky?" and this was the genesis of "How Deep Is the Ocean?".

== Background ==
The song was written at a low point in Irving Berlin's professional and personal life, and is among the select few of his numbers that were introduced on the radio rather than on stage or film. This song, together with "Say It Isn't So", were huge hits in 1932 and brought Berlin back to the top again.

=== Lyrics ===
The lyrics opens with a question "How much do I love you?" and the statement "I'll tell you no lie." The rest of the song is a series of rhetorical questions (including the title "How deep is the ocean?" twice) which implicitly answer the opening question to be a lot.

== Early recordings ==
Popular versions of "How Deep Is the Ocean?" in 1932 were by Guy Lombardo (vocal by Carmen Lombardo), Paul Whiteman and His Orchestra (with vocals by Jack Fulton), Rudy Vallée and Ethel Merman. Bing Crosby was another who recorded the song for Brunswick on October 14, 1932. In the 1940s Alfredo Antonini and his orchestra collaborated with Victoria Cordova and John Serry Sr. to record the song for Muzak.

== Other recordings ==
- Paul Whiteman – 1932
- Benny Goodman with Peggy Lee – 1941
- Coleman Hawkins – 1943
- Nat King Cole – 1946
- Artie Shaw with Hal Stevens – 1946
- Miles Davis - 1953
- Billie Holiday – Recital by Billie Holiday (1954)
- Ella Fitzgerald on her Ella Fitzgerald Sings the Irving Berlin Song Book from 1958.
- Frank Sinatra on his 1960 album Nice 'n' Easy
- Art Blakey with Wynton Marsalis – Straight Ahead (1981)
- Chet Baker and Paul Bley – Diane (1985)
- Eric Clapton on his album Clapton from 2010

== See also ==
- List of 1930s jazz standards
