= Moondreams (Dick Haymes album) =

Studio album by Dick Haymes
- Released: 1957
- Recorded: April 13, 16, 18, 23, 1956
- Genre: Pop, jazz
- Label: Capitol, T-787

Dick Haymes chronology
Rain or Shine (1956)	Moondreams (1957)

Professional ratings
Review scores
Source	Rating
Allmusic	link

Moondreams is an album from Dick Haymes, released in 1957, arranged & conducted by Ian Bernard. Concert master of the sessions was Felix Slatkin.

== Track listing ==
1. "If I Should Lose You" (Leo Robin, Ralph Rainger)
2. "You Don't Know What Love Is" (Don Raye, Gene De Paul)
3. "Imagination" (Jimmy Van Heusen, Johnny Burke)
4. "Skylark" (Hoagy Carmichael, Johnny Mercer)
5. "Isn't This a Lovely Day?" (Irving Berlin)
6. "What's New?" (Bob Haggart, Johnny Burke)
7. "The Way You Look Tonight" (Dorothy Fields, Jerome Kern)
8. "Then I'll Be Tired of You" (Yip Harburg, Arthur Schwartz)
9. "I Like the Likes of You" (Vernon Duke, E. Y. Harburg)
10. "Moonlight Becomes You" (Jimmy Van Heusen, Johnny Burke)
11. "Between the Devil and the Deep Blue Sea" (Harold Arlen, Ted Koehler)
12. "When I Fall In Love" (Edward Heyman, Victor P. Young)

== Recording musicians ==
- Dick Haymes (vocals)
- Murray McEachern (trombone) on the small combo sessions|
- Abe Most (clarinet) on the small combo sessions
- Ian Bernard (piano) on the small combo sessions
- Al Hendrickson (guitar) on the small combo sessions
- Joe Comfort (bass) on the small combo sessions
- Sid Bulkin (drums) on the small combo sessions
- Alvin Stoller (drums) on the large orchestral sessions
- Jimmy Rowles (piano) in the large orchestra

== Sources ==
- The booklet of the CD collection: The Complete Capitol Collection, written by Ruth Prigozy and Ken Barnes.
