= Breakin' Out =

Studio album by George Shearing
- Released: 1987
- Recorded: 1987
- Genre: Jazz
- Length: 39:18
- Label: Concord
- Producer: Carl Jefferson

George Shearing chronology
A Vintage Year (1987)	Breakin' Out (1987)	Dexterity (1987)

Professional ratings
Review scores
Source	Rating
Allmusic	4/5 stars
The Penguin Guide to Jazz Recordings	3/4 stars

Breakin' Out is a 1987 studio album by the pianist George Shearing, accompanied by Ray Brown and Marvin "Smitty" Smith.

== Track listing ==
1. "Just Squeeze Me (But Please Don't Tease Me)" (Duke Ellington, Lee Gaines) – 5:57
2. "Day Dream" (Ellington, John La Touche) – 4:24
3. "Hallucinations" (Bud Powell) – 3:54
4. "In the Wee Small Hours of the Morning" (Bob Hilliard, David Mann) – 6:00
5. "What'll I Do" (Irving Berlin) – 4:12
6. "Break Out the Blues" (George Shearing) – 4:48
7. "Don't Get Around Much Anymore" (Ellington, Bob Russell) – 5:57
8. "Isn't This a Lovely Day?" (Berlin) – 3:17
9. "Twelve Tone Blues" (Leonard Feather) – 3:38
10. "Prelude to a Kiss" (Ellington, Mack Gordon, Irving Mills) – 6:24
11. "There Is No Greater Love" (Isham Jones, Marty Symes) – 5:32

== Personnel ==
=== Performance ===
- George Shearing – piano
- Ray Brown – double bass
- Marvin "Smitty" Smith – drums
