= Kiri Sidetracks: The Jazz Album =

Studio album by Kiri Te Kanawa
- Released: May 12, 1992
- Recorded: May 1991
- Studios: BMG Studios, New York City
- Genre: Jazz
- Length: 62:56
- Label: PolyGram
- Producers: John McClure, Anna Barry

Kiri Te Kanawa chronology
Magic: Kiri Te Kanawa Sings Michel Legrand (1992)	Kiri Sidetracks: The Jazz Album (1992)	Heart to Heart (1992)

Kiri Sidetracks: The Jazz Album is a 1992 jazz vocal album by the operatic soprano Kiri Te Kanawa, accompanied by a jazz trio of André Previn, Mundell Lowe and Ray Brown.

== Track listing ==
1. "A Sleepin' Bee" (Harold Arlen, Truman Capote) – 3:55
2. "Honeysuckle Rose" (Andy Razaf, Fats Waller) – 5:06
3. "Cute" (Stanley Styne, Neal Hefti) – 3:02
4. "It Could Happen to You" (Johnny Burke, Jimmy Van Heusen) – 2:44
5. "Like Someone in Love" (Johnny Burke, Jimmy Van Heusen) – 4:40
6. "Autumn Leaves" (Jacques Prévert, Johnny Mercer, Joseph Kosma) – 3:58
7. "It Never Was You" (Kurt Weill, Maxwell Anderson) – 3:29
8. "The Shadow of Your Smile" (Paul Francis Webster, Johnny Mandel) – 5:12
9. "Too Marvelous for Words" (Johnny Mercer, Richard Whiting) – 3:46
10. "Angel Eyes" (Earl Brent, Matt Dennis) – 4:22
11. "Why Don't You Do Right" (Joe McCoy) – 3:50
12. "The Second Time Around" (Sammy Cahn, Jimmy Van Heusen) – 4:59
13. "Teach Me Tonight" (Sammy Cahn, Gene DePaul) – 3:10
14. "Polka Dots and Moonbeams" (Johnny Burke, Jimmy Van Heusen) – 5:01
15. "It's Easy to Remember" (Richard Rodgers, Lorenz Hart) – 5:40

== Personnel ==
- Kiri Te Kanawa – vocals
- Ray Brown – double bass
- Mundell Lowe – guitar
- André Previn – piano
