= Jeff Hamilton (drummer) =

American jazz drummer

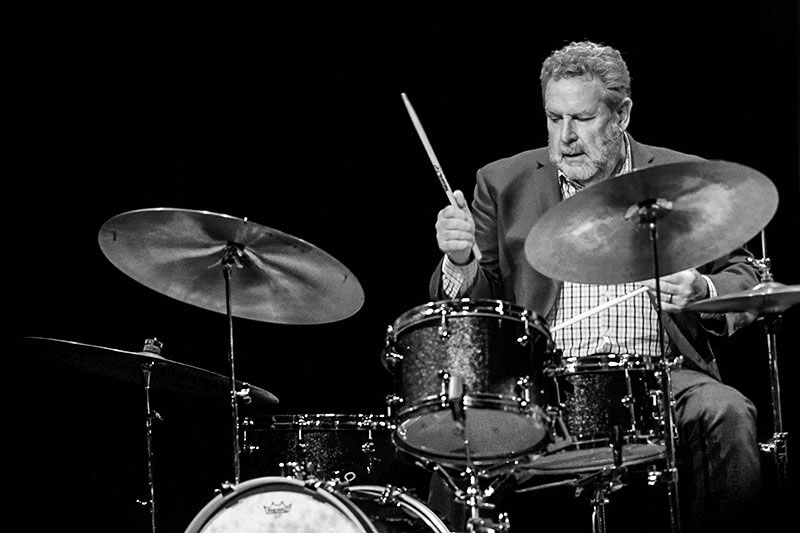
- 2018 in Denmark

Background information
- Born: August 4, 1953 (age 73); Richmond, Indiana, U.S.
- Genres: Jazz
- Occupation: Musician
- Instrument: Drums
- Years active: 1975–present
- Labels: Mons (de), Azica, Capri
- Website: www.hamiltonjazz.com

Jeff Hamilton (born August 4, 1953) is an American jazz drummer and co-leader of the Clayton-Hamilton Jazz Orchestra. A former member of the L.A. Four, Hamilton has played with jazz pianist Monty Alexander, bandleader Woody Herman, and singer Rosemary Clooney, and has worked extensively with singer Diana Krall.

== Early life ==
Hamilton was born in Richmond, Indiana, United States,. From a young age he took piano lessons but was inspired at age five by Gene Krupa and then began drumming at the age of eight. At fifteen, he was invited to play with the Earlham College jazz ensemble. He later attended Indiana University while studying under the tutelage of John Von Ohlen.

== Music career ==
Starting in 1975, he was a member of Monty Alexander's Trio, then Woody Herman's Orchestra from 1977 until 1978. He was a member of the L.A. Four, with whom he made six albums. He co-leads the Clayton-Hamilton Jazz Orchestra with Jeff Clayton and John Clayton. He also leads his own trio, with Jon Hamar on bass and Tadataka Unno on piano.

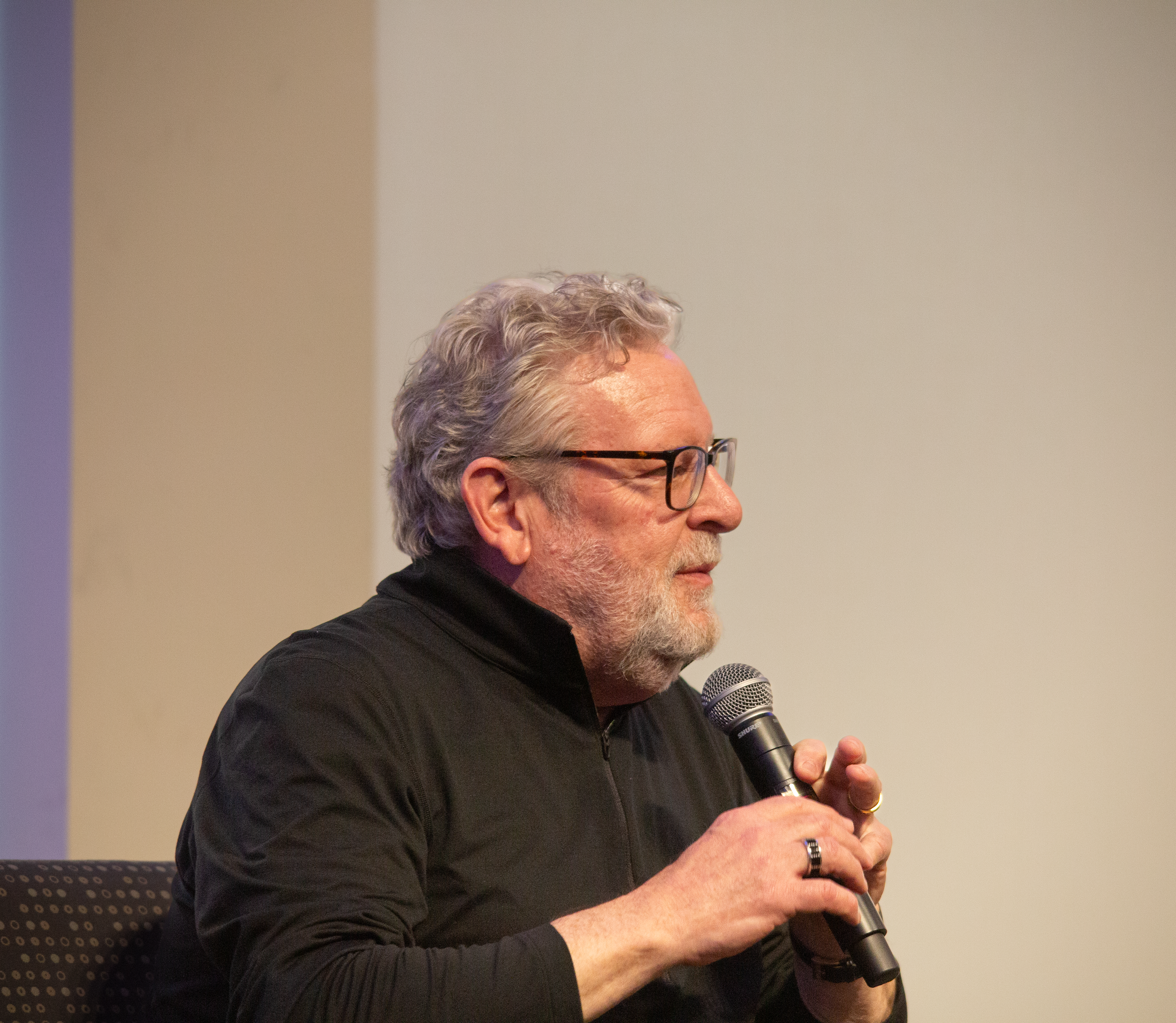
Hamilton in 2024

Hamilton has worked with Ella Fitzgerald, Rosemary Clooney, the Count Basie Orchestra, Oscar Peterson, and Ray Brown. He toured with Diana Krall and has played on several of her albums. In Japan with Krall in 2002, Hamilton became a fan of Hammond B3 organists Atsuko Hashimoto, and Akiko Tsuruga, and went on to record albums and tour with them.

== Equipment ==
Hamilton was co-owner of Bosphorus Cymbals. He then started his own cymbal company, Crescent Cymbals, with Michael Vosbein, Bill Norman, and drummer Stanton Moore. Sabian bought out Crescent Cymbals and will be redistributing them through their "Hand-Hammered series." He also plays Mapex Black Panther drums and Remo drum heads (Fiberskyn 3 Diplomat) and his signature Innovative Percussion sticks and brushes.

== Discography ==
=== As leader ===
- Indiana (Concord Jazz, 1992)
- It's Hamilton Time (Lake Street, 1994)
- Live! (Mons, 1996)
- Dynavibes (Mons, 1997)
- Hamilton House: Live at Steamers (Mons, 2000)
- Hands On (Mons, 2002)
- The Best Things Happen (Azica, 2004)
- From Studio 4, Cologne, Germany (Azica, 2006)
- Symbiosis (Capri, 2009)
- Red Sparkle (Capri, 2012)
- Time Passes On (Jazzed Media, 2012)
- The L.A. Session (In + Out, 2013)
- Live From San Pedro (Capri, 2018)
- Equal Time with Akiko Tsuruga, Graham Dechter (Capri, 2019)
- Catch Me If You Can (Capri, 2020)
- Merry & Bright (Capri, 2021)
- Coast To Coast with Akiko Tsuruga, Steve Kovalcheck (R.M.I. Records, 2025)

With the L.A. 4

- 1978 Just Friends
- 1978 Watch What Happens
- 1979 Live at Montreux
- 1980 Zaca
- 1981 Montage
- 1982 Executive Suite

=== As sideman ===
With Monty Alexander

- 1976 The Monty Alexander Trio LIVE! at the Montreux Festival
- 1977 Live in Holland
- 1979 Facets
- 1983 Reunion in Europe
- 1986 Li'l Darlin'

With Ernestine Anderson

- 1979 Sunshine
- 1983 Big City
- 1989 Boogie Down

With Ray Brown

- 1979 Live at the Concord Jazz Festival
- 1983 Trio also with Judy Roberts
- 1988 Summer Wind: Live at the Loa
- 1989 Bam Bam Bam
- 1989 Black Orpheus
- 1991 Georgia on My Mind
- 1991 Three Dimensional
- 1993 Bassface Live at Kuumbwa
- 1994 Don't Get Sassy

With Michael Bublé

- 2005 It's Time
- 2007 Call Me Irresponsible

With Benny Carter

- 1994 Elegy in Blue (MusicMasters)

With Rosemary Clooney

- 1979 Rosemary Clooney Sings the Lyrics of Ira Gershwin
- 1989 Show Tunes
- 1994 Still on the Road
- 2000 Brazil

With Natalie Cole

- 1991 Unforgettable... with Love
- 1993 Take a Look
- 1994 Holly & Ivy

With Scott Hamilton

- 1979 Tenorshoes
- 1991 Race Point
- 2015 Live in Bern

With Atsuko Hashimoto

- 2008 Introducing Atsuko Hashimoto
- 2011 Until the Sun Comes Up

With Gene Harris

- 1988 Tribute to Count Basie
- 1989 Listen Here!
- 1989 Live at Town Hall, N.Y.C.

With Diana Krall

- 1993 Stepping Out
- 1999 When I Look in Your Eyes
- 2001 The Look of Love
- 2002 Live in Paris
- 2006 From This Moment On
- 2009 Quiet Nights
- 2017 Turn Up the Quiet
- 2020 This Dream of You

With Cory Weeds

- 2015 This Happy Madness
- 2017 Dreamsville

With others

- 1977 Soul Fusion, Milt Jackson
- 1979 Conception, Ted Nash
- 1981 East of Suez, Jackie and Roy
- 1981 Bop for Kerouac, Mark Murphy
- 1982 Latin Odyssey, Laurindo Almeida
- 1987 Spontaneous Combustion, Barney Kessel
- 1988 Perfect Match, George Shearing
- 1988 Reunion, Mel Tormé
- 1992 Full Circle, Jackie and Roy
- 1992 In Tribute, Diane Schuur
- 1992 Midnight Sun, Herb Alpert
- 1993 Back to Broadway, Barbra Streisand
- 1994 Timepiece, Kenny Rogers
- 1996 Prelude to a Kiss: The Duke Ellington Album, Dee Dee Bridgewater
- 1998 Manilow Sings Sinatra, Barry Manilow
- 1998 These Are Special Times, Céline Dion
- 2004 Reneé Olstead, Renee Olstead
- 2006 Dear Mr. Sinatra, John Pizzarelli
- 2008 Blues & Beyond, WDR Big Band
- 2012 It's a Wonderful World, Stacey Kent
- 2012 Kisses on the Bottom, Paul McCartney
- 2013 Wilford Brimley With the Jeff Hamilton Trio, Wilford Brimley
- 2014 Life Journey, Leon Russell
