= Ray Brown (musician) =

American jazz musician (1926–2002)

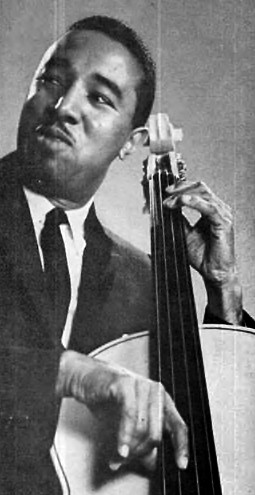
- Brown in a 1961 DownBeat advertisement

Background information
- Born: Raymond Matthews Brown; October 13, 1926; Pittsburgh, Pennsylvania, U.S.
- Died: July 2, 2002 (aged 75) Indianapolis, Indiana, U.S.
- Genre: Jazz
- Occupation: Musician
- Instruments: Double bass, cello
- Years active: 1946–2002
- Labels: Verve; Concord; Pablo; Telarc; Atlantic; Blue Note; Warner Bros.; Impulse!
- Spouse: Ella Fitzgerald (m. 1947; div. 1953)

Raymond Matthews Brown (October 13, 1926 – July 2, 2002) was an American jazz double bassist, known for his extensive work with Oscar Peterson and Ella Fitzgerald. He was also a founding member of the group that would later develop into the Modern Jazz Quartet.

== Early life ==
Ray Brown was born on October 13, 1926, in Pittsburgh, Pennsylvania, and took piano lessons as a child. After noticing how many pianists attended his high school, he thought of taking up the trombone, but his father was unable to afford one. With a vacancy in the high school jazz orchestra, he took up the upright bass instead.

A major early influence on Brown's bass playing was Jimmy Blanton, the bassist in the Duke Ellington band. Brown's high school music teacher believed that he was a diligent student, as he took the bass home with him on weekends. Brown, however, was already using the school bass in gigs; when this was discovered, the bass had to be returned and Brown's father bought him one. Brown graduated from high school in 1944.

== Later life and career ==
As a young man Brown became increasingly well known in the Pittsburgh jazz scene, with his first experiences playing in bands with the Jimmy Hinsley Sextet (Note: Jimmy Hinsley, (aka J. Hinsley, Jr., né James Jay Hinsley, Jr.; 1918–1975) was an Atlanta-born territory band leader.) and the Snookum Russell band. Later, having heard stories about the burgeoning jazz scene on 52nd Street in New York City, he bought a one-way ticket to New York. He arrived in New York at the age of 20, met up with Hank Jones, with whom he had previously worked, and was introduced to Dizzy Gillespie, who was looking for a bass player. Gillespie hired Brown on the spot, and he soon played with such established musicians as Art Tatum and Charlie Parker. In 1948, Brown left Dizzy's band to start a trio with Hank Jones and Charlie Smith.

From 1946 to 1951, Brown played in Gillespie's band. Brown, along with the vibraphonist Milt Jackson, drummer Kenny Clarke, and pianist John Lewis formed the rhythm section of the Gillespie band. Lewis, Clarke, and Jackson eventually formed the Modern Jazz Quartet. Brown became acquainted with singer Ella Fitzgerald when she joined the Gillespie band as a special attraction for a tour of the southern United States in 1947. The two married that year, and together they adopted a child born to Fitzgerald's half-sister Frances, whom they christened Ray Brown, Jr. Fitzgerald and Brown divorced in 1953, bowing to the various career pressures both were experiencing at the time, though they would continue to perform together.

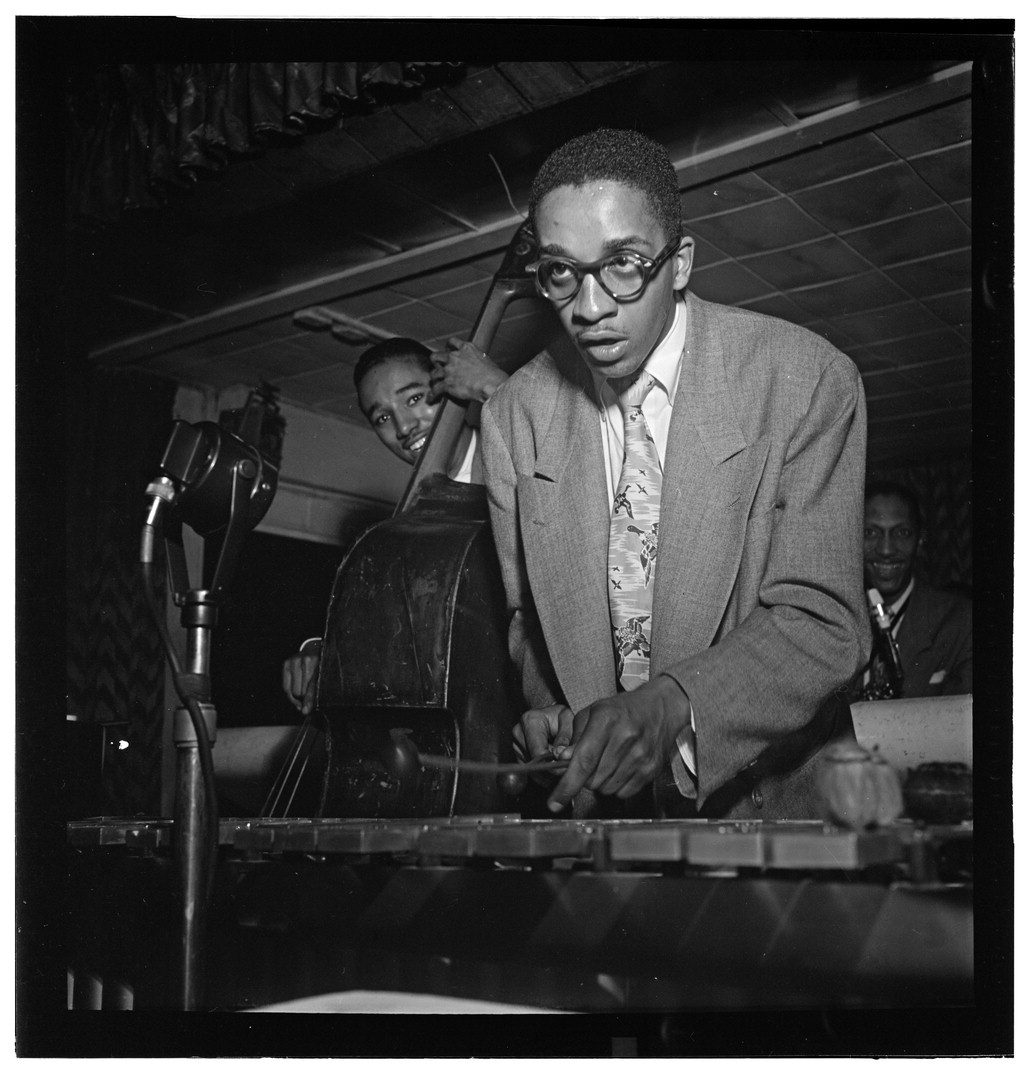
Milt Jackson and Ray Brown (left), New York, between 1946 and 1948 (William P. Gottlieb 04461)

From 1951 to 1965, Brown was a member of the Oscar Peterson Trio. The trio included a guitarist until 1958 (initially Barney Kessel, and then Herb Ellis). After Ellis left the group, Peterson decided to continue the trio with Brown and drummer Ed Thigpen. Brown recorded extensively as a session musician for producer Norman Granz during the 1950s (for Granz's Clef, Norgran, and Verve record labels), often alongside Peterson. After leaving the Oscar Peterson Trio, Brown concentrated on studio work in Los Angeles.

In the early 1960s, Brown began teaching, at the Advanced School of Contemporary Music, based in Toronto.

Brown guested as a bass player on "Razor Boy", the second track on Steely Dan's second album, Countdown to Ecstasy, released in 1973.

From 1974 to 1982, Brown performed and recorded a series of albums with guitarist Laurindo Almeida, saxophonist and flutist Bud Shank, and drummer Shelly Manne (replaced by Jeff Hamilton after 1977) under the name The L.A. Four.

In the 1980s and 1990s Brown led his own trios and continued to refine his bass playing style. In his later years he recorded and toured extensively with pianist Gene Harris. In the early 1980s, Brown met Diana Krall in a restaurant in Nanaimo, British Columbia. According to Jeff Hamilton, in an interview recorded on the Diana Krall Live in Rio DVD, he first heard Krall play at a workshop and, impressed with her piano skills (she was not yet singing), introduced her to bassist John Clayton. Hamilton and Clayton both encouraged Krall to move to Los Angeles to study under Brown and others. In 1986 Brown played bass on the song “Poisoned Rose” on Elvis Costello’s King of America album. In 1990, he teamed up with pianist Bobby Enriquez and drummer Foster, for Enriquez's album, The Wildman Returns.

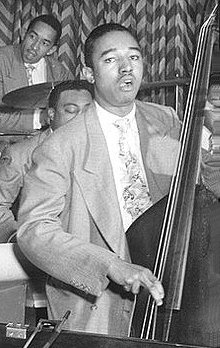
Brown, c. 1947 in a band with Dizzy Gillespie

Around the same time, Brown made seven albums with pianist André Previn when, after a hiatus of two decades, Previn returned to jazz to perform and record regularly again between 1989 and 2002: After Hours (1989, with guitarist Joe Pass), Uptown (1990, with guitarist Mundell Lowe), Old Friends (1992, live recording, with guitarist Mundell Lowe), Kiri Sidetracks. The Jazz Album (1992, with singer Kiri Te Kanawa and guitarist Mundell Lowe), What Headphones? (1992, with Mundell Lowe, Jim Pugh on trombone, Warren Vache on cornet, Richard Todd on horn, Grady Tate on drums, and The Antioch Baptist Choir), André Previn and Friends Play Show Boat (1995, with Mundell Lowe and Grady Tate), and Jazz at the Musikverein (1997, live recording, with Mundell Lowe). Brown and Previn had recorded together before in the 1960s on 4 To Go! (1963, with guitarist Herb Ellis and drummer Shelly Manne) and Right as the Rain (1967, with singer Leontyne Price). An hour-long film, Together on Broadway. The Making of Sidetracks documents the work on the album Kiri Sidetracks. The Jazz Album.

Brown played for a time with the "Quartet" with Monty Alexander, Milt Jackson, and Mickey Roker. After that he toured again with his own trio, with several young pianists such as Benny Green, Geoffrey Keezer, and Larry Fuller. The last edition of the Ray Brown Trio included pianist Larry Fuller and drummer Karriem Riggins. With that trio, Brown continued to perform until his death. Brown died in his sleep on July 2, 2002, after having played golf, before a show in Indianapolis.

== Awards and honors ==
In 1995, Brown was awarded an Honorary Doctorate of Music from Berklee College of Music. In 2001, Brown was awarded the Austrian Cross of Honour for Science and Art, 1st class and in 2003, he was inducted into the DownBeat Jazz Hall of Fame.

He was awarded his first Grammy for his composition "Gravy Waltz", a tune which would later be used as the theme song for The Steve Allen Show.

== Bibliography ==
- Brown, Ray (1999). Ray Brown's Bass Method: Essential Scales, Patterns, and Exercises. Hal Leonard Corporation. ISBN 978-0793594566.

== See also ==
- List of jazz bassists
