= Jazz ambassadors =

Jazz sponsors to the US State Department

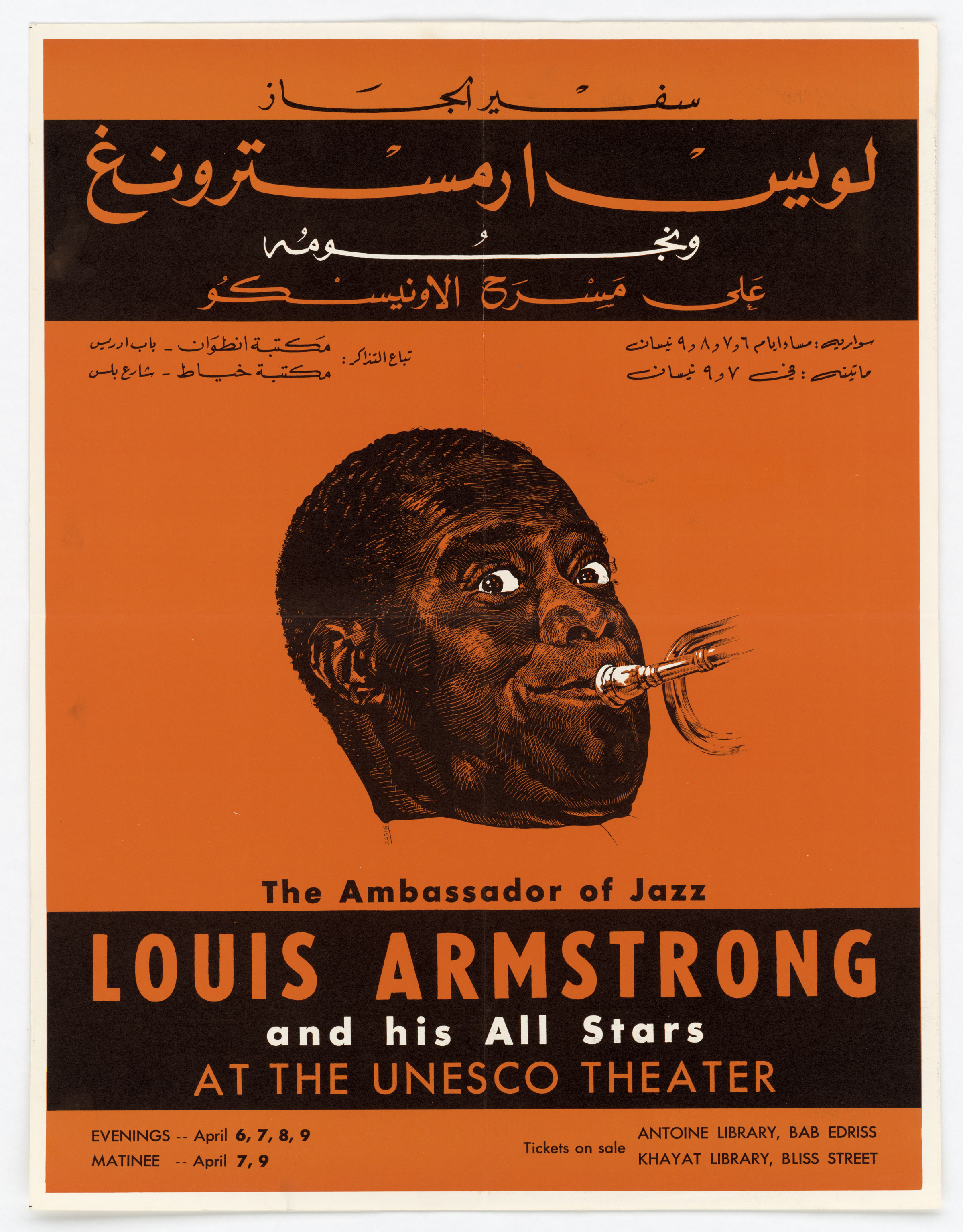
Poster advertising a 1959 Louis Armstrong concert in Beirut, Lebanon

Jazz ambassadors is the name often given to jazz musicians who were sponsored by the US State Department to tour Eastern Europe, the Middle East, central and southern Asia and Africa as part of cultural diplomacy initiatives to promote American values globally.

Starting in 1956, the State Department began hiring leading American jazz musicians such as Louis Armstrong, Dizzy Gillespie, Dave Brubeck, Benny Goodman and Duke Ellington to be "ambassadors" for the United States overseas, particularly to improve the public image of the US in the light of criticism from the Soviet Union around racial inequality and racial tension.

== Background ==
In the early 1950s, against the backdrop of the civil rights movement, decolonialisation and the Cold War, U.S. policy makers realised a new approach to American cultural diplomacy was needed. President Eisenhower was particularly concerned with how internal race relations affected America's international reputation. He saw the Cold War as a battle of ideas and that a cultural exchange program could address some of these concerns. Congress formalised the President's Special International Program for Participation in International Affairs, also known as the Cultural Presentations Program, in 1956. U.S. officials explained that the main purpose of the program was to "counteract Russian propaganda".

The program was supervised by the State Department, who had final approval over artist selection, and the American National Theatre and Academy (ANTA). The program was also sponsored by the government owned broadcaster Voice of America (VOA). While the program included a wide variety of cultural and artistic forms, jazz was quickly embraced by the State Department due to being an indigenous American artform. Jazz's association with African-Americans, as well as its racially mixed bands, also meant it could serve as a demonstration of racial equality and harmony. The State Department made sure that selection panels only chose suitable artists, taking into account their musicianship, "Americanness" and integrity as well as the personal character and racial make-up of their bands.

== Armstrong's refusal of the Jazz Ambassador Russian tour ==
Louis Armstrong toured with State Department starting in November 1955. Negotiations were underway for Armstrong to perform in the USSR in 1957, a triumph for the State Department, but he abruptly canceled these plans because of the Little Rock school desegregation crisis, stating "The way they are treating my people in the South, the government can go to hell!".

Known as the Little Rock Crisis, this event highlighted the hypocrisy of the "US values" intended to be displayed through the jazz tours, namely democracy, equality, and freedom. All of which were denied to the nine students of Little Rock and more widely all African Americans as the struggle for civil rights, in the Southern states of the US, went on.

Jazz diplomacy played a more subtle and significant role in the Cold War than first envisioned, as not only Armstrong saw the irony in representing a country that preached democracy abroad while it was denied to some of its own citizens. Influential jazz musicians more often vocalized their opinions on, and often condemned, US government action (mainly concerning civil rights), the longer they played their highlighted jazz ambassador role. Ultimately US diplomats themselves played up Armstrong's initial defiance as an example of American's superiority in freedom of speech - "even a black man could criticize his own government and not be punished - " thus playing a weak hand well.

== Jazz ambassador tours ==
=== First tours: 1956-1958 ===
Poster advertising Louis Armstrong, Dizzie Gillespie, Mahalia Jackson, and Count Basie to Arabic speaking audiences, 1960.

Dizzy Gillespie headed the first State Department sponsored tour in March 1956 which lasted for ten weeks. Democratic Congressman Adam Clayton Powell Jr. had long been an advocate for including jazz in cultural tours and was crucial in setting up Gillespie's tour. An 18-piece interracial band led by Gillespie, with Quincy Jones as music director, performed across Europe, Asia and South America including Iran, Pakistan, Lebanon, Turkey, Yugoslavia, Greece and Argentina. An American ambassador reported back that "we could have built a new tank for the cost of this tour, but you can't get as much goodwill out of a tank as you can out of Dizzy Gillespie's band." The Gillespie's tour was successful in improving America's reputation and created a template for subsequent tours by other musicians. Gillespie drew criticism, however, for reports that while touring Brazil he had prioritised associating with local musicians over attending official events. He did not perform for the State Department again for over a decade.

For the next jazz ambassador tour the State Department's frontman was Benny Goodman. In December 1957 Goodman's band began a seven-week tour of East and Southeast Asia. This tour reaped benefits not only for its impact on the general public but also for strengthening American ties to the rulers of the countries he visited. While in Thailand, Goodman made a significant impression on King Bhumibol Adulyadej, himself a musician and jazz enthusiast, and the king playing with Goodman's band. Goodman promoted the idea that racism had already been defeated in America. He later said "I was constantly asked by the press over there about the colored people here. [...] I guess they had been fed a lot of Communist propaganda". Much like Gillespie's tour, Goodman's tour was a diplomatic success. Following the tour, Goodman, the child of Russian immigrants, unsuccessfully tried to gain an invitation to tour in the Soviet Union.

Dave Brubeck's quartet toured for the State Department in 1958. He played in East Germany and Poland before touring Turkey, Afghanistan, Pakistan, India and Sri Lanka. Secretary of State John Dulles himself extended the tour, and the group's engagements in the United States were cancelled. The band played in Iran and then Iraq. They had received no briefing on the political situation in Iraq but the musicians could sense the dangerous situation in the country. Only a few weeks after Brubeck had departed, Abd al-Karim Qasim overthrew the monarchy in a coup d'état.

Duke Ellington was one the most influential jazz ambassadors in promoting Black music as both modern art and an integral part in showcasing American ideals overseas. During the Cold War, the Brown v. The Board of Education case was a turning point for the United States. The U.S. considered themselves the champions of democracy, but the issues regarding racial inequality undermined this image. Segregation exposed America's Achilles heel, as historian Kevin Gaines stated, "racial inequality was the achilles heel of America's image as the leader of the Free World. To counter the negative perception, the U.S. State Department convinced the Eisenhower administration to send African American cultural production and musicians, such as Ellington abroad to showcase culture and improve the nations image. On August 28, 1963, The Duke Ellington Orchestra began its first State Department tour, departing from New York City for Damascus. The three-month long tour of the middle east included countries such as Syria, Jordan, Afghanistan, India, Ceylon, Pakistan, Iran, Iraq, Lebanon, and Turkey. Ellington's republican ideas and his excellence as an orchestra leader made him the perfect fit as an American cultural ambassadors. His approach to leading his band, which encouraged extended solos, brought out the best in his musicians. Ellington's musical style embodied American cultural ideals, a country that envisioned itself as both inclusive and free. In September through October 1971, Duke and his orchestra toured the Soviet Union, marking their most significant and publicized State Department tour to date. The U.S. State Department increased Duke Ellington's appearances worldwide, leading to a significant amount of positive international publicity. Ellington's tours around the world resonated with many who found freedom in Duke's music and identified with the shared struggle for liberation during the period of the Cold War.

=== Similar tours and legacy ===
A few years later, when Louis Armstrong arrived in the Congo as part of a tour through Africa, drummers and dancers paraded him through the streets on a throne. When he played in Katanga Province, a truce was called in a long-standing civil war so the combatants on both sides could go see him play.

In the decades since the Bureau of Educational and Cultural Affairs in the US State Department has sponsored Jazz Ambassadors in partnership with the John F. Kennedy Center for the Performing Arts. Alongside their performances, they also conduct master classes and lecture-recitals for local musicians. The State Department likewise sponsors hip-hop artists, particularly in the Middle East.

=== The USSR’s reaction to the jazz ambassadors ===
There was a complex cultural and political progress surrounding its reception. Jazz, previously condemned by The Third Reich as a degraded and un-German, sparked excitement among many Germans after the fall of Nazi Germany, as it symbolized modernity and freedom. However, the first reactions were suspicious, as jazz was often seen as an inferior art form, with criticisms rooted in longstanding racial and cultural prejudices. In 1946, the Soviet Union defended jazz against German judgment, underscoring its ideological value as an anti-fascist art. Yet, German publications like Hörzu dismissed jazz as a poor attempt to rework superior European musical traditions. Critiques of jazz also echoed prewar rhetoric, attacking both the music and the young male dancers in Hot Clubs, which they deemed unruly and morally suspect. These concerns extended to young women, as critics feared the perceived sexual dangers jazz potentially posed to their innocence or virtue. By the early 1950s, the Soviets changed their stance, repressing jazz in East Germany and banning it from the radio. Both East and West Germany, in response to the growing popularity of jazz, implemented educational measures geared at shielding German youth from what they saw as the corrupting influence of jazz and its notion of sexual desires. Reactions to jazz were deeply associated with broader anxieties about gender, morality, and the preservation of cultural identity in a divided Germany.

During the Cold War, the relationship between jazz and Soviet society continued to evolve. In the late 1950s, the Soviets rejected jazz, dismissing it as inferior to their classical music traditions. This stance was consistent with earlier back-and-forth Soviet attitudes, where jazz was alternately embraced and suppressed from the 1920s to the 1940s. By the mid-1950s, Soviet officials allowed symphonic jazz but condemned what they called "decadent jazz," influenced by their racial ideology, which sought to distance the genre from its African-American roots. However, some individuals in the USSR sympathized with jazz musicians, viewing them as fellow oppressed workers. The paradoxical relationship between jazz and the USSR in the late 1940s shows that despite official suppression, Red Army officers stationed in East Germany secretly brought jazz records to enjoy, reflecting the genre's enduring appeal even within the rigid constraints of Soviet ideology. By the 1960s, public support for jazz grew, creating pressure on official Soviet policy. Figures like Leonid Osipovich Utyosov championed jazz, arguing through Marxist ideology that it reflected the struggles of poor African Americans rather than capitalist values. Soviet youth and endorsements from leaders like Utyosov, as well as calls for jazz nightclubs in youth publications like Komsomolskaya, further fueled this demand. Despite increased popularity, Soviet artists feared association with American jazz musicians during ambassador tours, as official approval remained inconsistent. In Duke Ellington's 1971 Soviet tour, unprecedented enthusiasm was seen in the population, contrary to the government's official stance. The Soviet press, typically critical of Western influences, praised Ellington's music, reflecting how deeply it resonated with audiences. Fans shouted, "We've been waiting for you for centuries," underscoring their anticipation. Tickets were so coveted that scalping became rampant, and officers even disguised themselves to gain entry to the performances. Ellington's impact was especially notable among the youth, with many eagerly seeking his autograph as a memento of the historic event.

== Cultural legacy ==
The jazz ambassador tours exposed the American musicians to new musical styles and traditions from the countries they visited. Duke Ellington's albums Far East Suite, Latin American Suite and Afro-Eurasian Eclipse were inspired by his tours as a jazz ambassador. Dizzy Gillespie's composition "Rio Pakistan" was similarly inspired by his 1956 tour. Several albums recorded during Gillespie's tours were released including Dizzy in Greece and World Statesman. Dave Brubeck's 1958 Jazz Impressions of Eurasia spawned from the music he had heard while touring as a jazz ambassador. The syncopated rhythms Brubeck heard from Turkish street musicians inspired his standard Blue Rondo à la Turk.

Dave Brubeck, who participated in the project, was critical of the experience. He and his wife Iola Brubeck later wrote a musical, The Real Ambassadors, based on his experiences.

Although influenced by new music exposed to them in the toured countries, jazz ambassadors in turn were able to influence the people of non-aligned countries. By researching and incorporating the local music of each country they visited, it allowed the state-funded jazz musicians to also present an America that was capable of celebrating and appreciating foreign local traditions.

The jazz ambassadors are featured in the Oscar nominated documentary Soundtrack to a Coup d'Etat. In the film, in 1961, the US State Department swings into action by sending jazz ambassador Louis Armstrong to Congo to deflect attention from the CIA-backed coup.

== See also ==
- United States Army Field Band

== Sources ==
- Davenport, Lisa E., (2009). Jazz Diplomacy: Promoting American in the Cold War, University Press of Mississippi
- Von Eschen, Penny, (2006). Satchmo Blows Up the World: Jazz Ambassadors Play the Cold War, Harvard University Press
