= Stan Getz and the Oscar Peterson Trio =

Studio album by Stan Getz and the Oscar Peterson Trio
- Released: 1958
- Recorded: October 10, 1957
- Studio: Capitol (Hollywood)
- Genre: Jazz
- Length: 47:30
- Label: Verve
- Producer: Norman Granz

Stan Getz chronology
Award Winner: Stan Getz (1957)	Stan Getz and the Oscar Peterson Trio (1958)	Gerry Mulligan Meets Stan Getz (1957)

Oscar Peterson chronology
Oscar Peterson at the Concertgebouw (1958)	Stan Getz and the Oscar Peterson Trio (1958)	Jazz Giants '58 (1958)

Professional ratings
Review scores
Source	Rating
AllMusic	4.5/5 stars
The Penguin Guide to Jazz Recordings	3/4 stars
The Rolling Stone Jazz Record Guide	3/5 stars

Stan Getz and the Oscar Peterson Trio is a 1958 studio album by Stan Getz, accompanied by the Oscar Peterson Trio.

Record producer Norman Granz arranged the pairing of Getz with the drummer-less Peterson trio, combining two talents under contract with his Verve record label. Getz was pleased with the results: "This is one of the most enjoyable recordings I ever made. How refreshing it is to play with these pros!” Getz, the Peterson trio, trombonist J.J. Johnson and drummer Connie Kay also cut a live record together around this time frame.

== Track listing ==
=== Original LP ===
==== Side 1 ====
1. "I Want to Be Happy" (Irving Caesar, Vincent Youmans) – 7:35
2. "Pennies from Heaven" (Arthur Johnston, Johnny Burke) – 5:16
3. Ballad Medley: "Bewitched, Bothered and Bewildered"/"I Don't Know Why (I Just Do)"/"How Long Has This Been Going On?"/"I Can't Get Started"/"Polka Dots and Moonbeams" (Richard Rodgers, Lorenz Hart)/(Fred E. Ahlert, Roy Turk)/(George Gershwin, Ira Gershwin)/(Vernon Duke, I. Gershwin)/(Jimmy Van Heusen, Burke) – 10:10

==== Side 2 ====
1. "I'm Glad There Is You" (Jimmy Dorsey, Paul Mertz) – 4:38
2. "Tour's End" (Stan Getz) – 4:55
3. "I Was Doing All Right" (G. Gershwin, I. Gershwin) – 4:08
4. "Bronx Blues" (Getz) – 5:31

=== CD reissue bonus tracks ===
8. "Three Little Words" (Bert Kalmar, Harry Ruby) – 6:35
9. "Detour Ahead" (Lou Carter, Herb Ellis, John Frigo) – 3:36
10. "Sunday" (Chester Conn, Benny Krueger, Ned Miller, Jule Styne) – 6:08
11. "Blues for Herky" (Getz) – 3:45
- Originally released on Stan Getz and Gerry Mulligan / Stan Getz and The Oscar Peterson Trio (Verve, 1959)

== Personnel ==
=== Musicians ===
- Stan Getz – tenor saxophone
- Oscar Peterson – piano
- Herb Ellis – guitar
- Ray Brown – bass

=== Technical personnel ===
- Norman Granz – producer
- Nat Hentoff – liner notes

== Re-releases ==
- 1990, (CD) Verve, Cat: 8278262
- 2015, (CD) Crackerjack Records, with bonus tracks "Candy" and "When Your Lover Has Gone" same personnel plus Gerry Mulligan (baritone saxophone), Harry "Sweets" Edison (trumpet) and Louie Bellson (drums), recorded Los Angeles, August 1, 1957)
- 2017, (LP) Jazz Images, Cat: LPJIM 37048
