= Birks' Works =

Studio album by Dizzy Gillespie
- Released: 1958
- Recorded: April 7 & 8, 1957 plus May 18 & 19, June 6, 1956, and July 8, 1957 (reissue compilation)
- Studio: NYC
- Genre: Jazz
- Length: 39:37
- Label: Verve; MGV 8222; 314 527 900-2 (Reissue Compilation)
- Producer: Norman Granz

Dizzy Gillespie chronology
Dizzy Gillespie and Stuff Smith (1957)	Birks' Works (1958)	Sittin' In (1958)

CD Compilation Reissue Cover

Birks' Works is a 1958 album by trumpeter Dizzy Gillespie recorded in 1957 and released on the Verve label.

== Release history ==
The original album featured 10 tracks and was reissued as Birks Works: The Verve Big Band Sessions, a 2 CD compilation featuring unreleased tracks, alternate takes and tracks from Gillespie's previous 1956 albums Dizzy in Greece and World Statesman.

== Reception ==
The Penguin Guide to Jazz selected the reissue compilation as part of its suggested Core Collection. The AllMusic review awarded the album 5 stars calling it "Essential music".

Professional ratings
Review scores
Source	Rating
AllMusic	5/5 stars
The Penguin Guide to Jazz	4/4 stars

== Track listing ==
All compositions by Dizzy Gillespie except as indicated

=== Original LP Release ===
==== Side one ====
1. "Jordu" (Duke Jordan) – 4:13
2. "Birks' Works" – 4:56
3. "Umbrella Man" (Vincent Rose, Larry Stock, James Cavanaugh) – 3:02
4. "Autumn Leaves" (Joseph Kosma, Jacques Prévert, Johnny Mercer) – 3:11
5. "Tangerine" (Victor Schertzinger, Mercer) – 3:43

==== Side two ====
1. "Over the Rainbow" (Harold Arlen, Yip Harburg) – 4:37
2. "Yo No Quiero Bailar" (Joe Willoughby) – 4:42
3. "If You Could See Me Now" (Tadd Dameron, Carl Sigman) – 3:30
4. "Left Hand Corner" (Ernie Wilkins) – 2:26
5. "Whisper Not" (Benny Golson, Leonard Feather) – 5:17

=== CD Compilation Reissue ===
Disc one

1. "Dizzy's Business" (Wilkins) – 3:37 Originally released on World Statesman
2. "Hey Pete! Let's Eat More Meat" (Gillespie, Buster Harding, Lester Peterson) – 5:39 Originally released on Dizzy in Greece
3. "Jessica's Day" (Quincy Jones) – 4:50 Originally released on World Statesman
4. "Tour de Force" – 5:04 Originally released on World Statesman
5. "I Can't Get Started" (Vernon Duke, Ira Gershwin) – 2:55 Originally released on World Statesman
6. "Stella by Starlight" (Ned Washington, Victor Young) – 4:07 Originally released on World Statesman
7. "Doodlin'" (Horace Silver) – 3:56 Originally released on World Statesman
8. "A Night in Tunisia" – 5:34 Originally released on World Statesman
9. "The Champ" – 4:42 Originally released on World Statesman
10. "Yesterdays" (Otto Harbach, Jerome Kern) – 3:46 Originally released on Dizzy in Greece
11. "Tin Tin Deo" (Gil Fuller, Gillespie, Chano Pozo) – 4:17 Originally released on Dizzy in Greece
12. "Groovin' for Nat" (Wilkins) – 3:21 Originally released on Dizzy in Greece
13. "My Reverie" (Larry Clinton, Claude Debussy) – 2:52 Originally released on World Statesman
14. "Dizzy's Blues" (Ahmad Khatab Salim) – 2:32 Originally released on World Statesman
15. "Annie's Dance" (Melba Liston) – 4:05 Originally released on Dizzy in Greece
16. "Cool Breeze" (Dameron, Billy Eckstine, Gillespie) – 4:55 Originally released on Dizzy in Greece
17. "School Days" (Will D. Cobb, Gus Edwards) – 4:23 Originally released on Dizzy in Greece
18. "Jordu" (Jordan) – 4:13
19. "Yo No Quiero Bailar" (Willoughby) – 4:42

Disc two

1. "Birks' Works" – 4:56
2. "Autumn Leaves" (Kosma, Mercer, Prevert) – 3:11
3. "Tangerine" (Mercer, Schertzinger) – 3:43
4. "Over the Rainbow" (Arlen, Harburg) – 4:37
5. "Umbrella Man" (Cavanaugh, Rose, Stock) – 3:02
6. "If You Could See Me Now" (Dameron, Sigman) – 3:30
7. "Left Hand Corner" [alternate take] (Wilkins) – 0:13 Previously unreleased
8. "Left Hand Corner" [alternate take] (Wilkins) – 2:26 Previously unreleased
9. "Left Hand Corner" [alternate take] (Wilkins) – 2:16 Previously unreleased
10. "Left Hand Corner" [alternate take] (Wilkins) – 0:10 Previously unreleased
11. "Left Hand Corner" [master take] (Wilkins) – 2:22
12. "Whisper Not" [alternate take] (Golson, Feather) – 5:52 Previously unreleased
13. "Whisper Not [alternate take] (Golson, Feather) – 5:08 Previously unreleased
14. "Whisper Not [master take] (Golson, Feather) – 5:17
15. "Stablemates" (Golson) – 4:12 Originally released on Dizzy in Greece
16. "That's All" (Alan Brandt, Bob Haymes) – 3:13 Originally released on Dizzy in Greece
17. "Groovin' High" [master take] – 3:53 Originally released on Dizzy in Greece
18. "Mayflower Rock" [alternate take] (Lee Brown) – 3:17 Previously unreleased
19. "Mayflower Rock" [master take] (Brown) – 3:14 Originally released as 45 rpm single B-side
20. "Joogie Boogie" – 4:14 Originally released as 45 rpm single
21. "I Remember Clifford" (Golson) – 4:15
22. "You'll Be Sorry" – 2:17 Previously unreleased
23. "Wonder Why" (Nicholas Brodszky, Sammy Cahn) – 3:51 Previously unreleased

== Personnel ==
=== On original LP and CD Compilation Reissue Disc One, tracks 18 and 19 and Disc Two, tracks 1–21 ===
- Dizzy Gillespie – trumpet, arranger
- Talib Daawud, Lee Morgan, Ermit V. Perry, Carl Warwick – trumpet
- Melba Liston – trombone, arranger
- Al Grey, Rod Levitt – trombone
- Ernie Henry, Jimmy Powell – alto saxophone
- Benny Golson – tenor saxophone, arranger
- Billy Mitchell – tenor saxophone
- Billy Root – baritone saxophone
- Wynton Kelly – piano
- Paul West – bass
- Charlie Persip – drums
- Austin Cromer – vocals (on "Over the Rainbow", "You No Quiero Bailer", "If You Could See Me Now" and "Mayflower Rock")
- Ernie Wilkins – arranger
- Recorded in New York City on April 7 & 8, 1957

=== On CD Compilation Reissue Disc One, tracks 1–17 ===
- Dizzy Gillespie – trumpet, vocals
- Joe Gordon, Quincy Jones, Ermit V. Perry, Carl Warwick – trumpet
- Rod Levitt, Melba Liston, Frank Rehak – trombone
- Jimmy Powell, Phil Woods – alto saxophone
- Billy Mitchell, Ernie Wilkins – tenor saxophone
- Marty Flax – baritone saxophone
- Walter Davis Jr. – piano
- Nelson Boyd – bass
- Charlie Persip – drums
- Recorded in New York City on May 18 & 19 and June 6, 1956

=== On CD Compilation Reissue Disc Two, tracks 22 and 23 ===
- Dizzy Gillespie, Talib Daawud, Lee Morgan, Ermit V. Perry, Carl Warwick – trumpet
- Al Grey, Melba Liston – trombone
- Ernie Henry, Jimmy Powell – alto saxophone
- Billy Mitchell, Benny Golson – tenor saxophone
- Pee Wee Moore – baritone saxophone
- Wynton Kelly – piano
- Paul West – bass
- Charlie Persip – drums
- Recorded in New York City on July 8, 1957
