= Hello Herbie =

Studio album by Oscar Peterson
- Released: 1970
- Recorded: November 5–6, 1969
- Genre: Jazz
- Length: 38:19
- Label: MPS; Pausa Records
- Producer: Hans Georg Brunner-Schwer

Oscar Peterson chronology
| Exclusively for My Friends (1970) | Hello Herbie (1970) | Tristeza on Piano (1970) |

Professional ratings
Review scores
| Source | Rating |
|---|---|
| Allmusic | 4/5 stars |

Hello Herbie is an album by pianist Oscar Peterson and his trio, joined by guitarist Herb Ellis.

== Track listing ==
1. "Naptown Blues" (Wes Montgomery) – 5:20
2. "Exactly Like You" (Dorothy Fields, Jimmy McHugh) – 4:50
3. "Seven Come Eleven" (Charlie Christian, Benny Goodman, Fletcher Henderson) – 5:06
4. "Hamp's Blues" (Hampton Hawes) – 3:46
5. "Blues for H.G." (Oscar Peterson) – 6:05
6. "A Lovely Way to Spend an Evening" (Harold Adamson, McHugh) – 8:23
7. "Day by Day" (Sammy Cahn, Axel Stordahl, Paul Weston) – 4:44

== Personnel ==
- Oscar Peterson – piano
- Herb Ellis – guitar
- Sam Jones – double bass
- Bobby Durham – drums

Production

- Hans Georg Brunner-Schwer – producer

== See also ==
- Oscar Peterson at the Stratford Shakespearean Festival (Verve, 1957) – with Herb Ellis
- Herb Ellis, Ellis in Wonderland (Norgran, 1956) – with Oscar Peterson
