= Jimmy Powell (musician) =

American jazz musician (1914–1994)

James Theodore Powell (October 24, 1914 – February 16, 1994) was an American jazz saxophonist who played alto sax.

He played on two recording dates with Billie Holiday for Columbia. The first, in February 1940, was with a band comprising Roy Eldridge on trumpet, Carl Frye and Powell on alto saxophones, Kermit Scott (musician) on tenor sax, Sonny White on piano, Lawrence Lucie on guitar, John Williams on bass and Hal West on drums. The second recording session was in May 1941, again with Eldridge, together with Lester Boone, Ernie Powell, and Jimmy Powell on alto saxophones, Eddie Heywood on piano, Paul Chapman on guitar, Grachan Moncur on bass, and Herbert Cowans on drums.

In December 1944, he recorded with Billy Eckstine and His Orchestra, with Oscar Pettiford, Art Blakey, Dexter Gordon, Gene Ammons, Thomas Crump, Wardell Gray, Dizzy Gillespie, Chippy Outcalt, and Trummie Young, among others. The album was released in 1960 as Mr "B".

In 1945, he recorded in New York with Don Byas and Hal Singer.

At the beginning of 1947, Powell was with Illinois Jacquet and his Orchestra, which featured Miles Davis, Marion Hazel, Fats Navarro and Joe Newman on trumpets, Gus Chapwell, Ted Kelly, Eli Robinson and Dickie Wells on trombones, Ray Perry and Powell on alto saxes, Jacquet and Big Nick Nicholas on tenor saxes, Leo Parker on baritone sax, Bill Doggett and Leonard Feather on piano, Al Lucas on bass and Shadow Wilson on drums, together with Tadd Dameron and Jimmy Mundy as arrangers. And again, in April the same year, with a slightly different line-up, this time featuring Jacquet, Navarro and Newman on trumpets, JJ Johnson on trombone, Powell or Perry on alto, Jacquet on tenor, Parker on baritone, Sir Charles Thompson on piano, Freddie Green on guitar, Lucas on bass and Wilson on drums.

In 1956, Powell was a member of the Dizzy Gillespie Big Band that recorded Groovin' High live at Birdland with Walter Bishop on piano, Nelson Boyd on bass, Marty Flax on baritone, Gillespie, Quincy Jones, Carl Warwick and Joe Gordon on trumpets, Benny Golson and Ernie Wilkins on tenor, Ernie Henry and Phil Woods on alto saxes, Roy Levitt and Melba Liston on trombones. He went on to record several albums with Gillespie.

== Discography ==
As sideman

- 1944: The Master's Touch - Lester Young (released 1993)
- 1953: Lucky Thompson & His Lucky Seven - Lucky Thompson, with Harold "Money" Johnson, Jimmy Powell, Clarence Williams, Earl Knight, Beverly Peer and Percy Brice.
- 1956: Groovin' High - Dizzy Gillespie
- 1956: World Statesman - Dizzy Gillespie
- 1957: Birks' Works - Dizzy Gillespie
- 1957: Dizzy in Greece - Dizzy Gillespie
- 1957: Dizzy Gillespie at Newport - Dizzy Gillespie
- 1958: Out There - Betty Carter
- 1963: Otis! The Definitive Otis Redding Otis Redding (released 1993)
- 1972: Soul Is... Pretty Purdie - Bernard Purdie
