= I Told Ya I Love Ya, Now Get Out =

1947 song

"I Told Ya I Love Ya, Now Get Out" is a popular song composed by Herb Ellis, Lou Carter, and John Frigo. The three men were members of Jimmy Dorsey's big band, but left in 1946 to form the jazz trio "The Soft Winds." While in the group, they composed another jazz standard, "Detour Ahead".

The lyric is addressed to a lover who has worn out their welcome with the singer: "Baby, please leave me be / You want a puppet and there's no strings on me!"

The song was originally recorded on October 19, 1947 by Woody Herman and His Orchestra, and released in 1948. In subsequent years, it was recorded by numerous artists, including Anita O'Day, June Christy and Stan Kenton, and Mose Allison.

== Popular culture ==
The song was performed by Cybill Shepherd in a 1985 episode of the TV series Moonlighting, "The Dream Sequence Always Rings Twice." It was Shepherd's own suggestion to sing the song, after a discussion she had with jazz critic Leonard Feather.
