= The Oscar Peterson Trio with Sonny Stitt, Roy Eldridge and Jo Jones at Newport =

The Oscar Peterson Trio with Roy Eldridge, Sonny Stitt and Jo Jones at Newport

Live album by Oscar Peterson
- Released: 1957
- Recorded: July 7, 1957
- Venue: Newport Jazz Festival, Newport, Rhode Island
- Genre: Jazz
- Length: 47:03
- Label: American Recording Society, Verve
- Producer: Norman Granz

Oscar Peterson chronology
Soft Sands (1957)	The Oscar Peterson Trio with Roy Eldridge, Sonny Stitt and Jo Jones at Newport (1957)	Jazz Giants '58 (1958)

Professional ratings
Review scores
Source	Rating
AllMusic	4/5 stars
Disc	3.5/5 stars

The Oscar Peterson Trio with Roy Eldridge, Sonny Stitt and Jo Jones at Newport is a 1957 live album by Oscar Peterson, accompanied by Roy Eldridge, Sonny Stitt and Jo Jones, recorded at the 1957 Newport Jazz Festival.

== Track listing ==
1. "Will You Still Be Mine?" (Tom Adair, Matt Dennis) – 4:59
2. "Joy Spring" (Clifford Brown) – 7:33
3. "A Gal in Calico" (Leo Robin, Arthur Schwartz) – 6:14
4. "52nd Street Theme" (Thelonious Monk) – 4:23
5. Jo Jones Introduction – 1:39
6. "Monitor Blues" (Roy Eldridge, Sonny Stitt) – 7:13
7. "Willow Weep for Me" (Ann Ronell) – 3:15
8. "Autumn in New York" (Vernon Duke) – 2:46
9. "Roy's Son" (Eldridge, Stitt) – 9:01

== Personnel ==
=== Performance ===
- Sonny Stitt – alto saxophone, tenor saxophone
- Roy Eldridge – trumpet
- Oscar Peterson – piano
- Ray Brown – double bass
- Herb Ellis – guitar
- Jo Jones – drums
