= In a Romantic Mood =

Studio album by Oscar Peterson
- Released: 1956
- Recorded: December 30, 1955
- Genre: Jazz
- Length: 44:45
- Label: Verve
- Producer: Norman Granz

Oscar Peterson chronology
Oscar Peterson Plays Count Basie (1956)	In a Romantic Mood (1956)	Oscar Peterson at the Stratford Shakespearean Festival (1956)

In a Romantic Mood is an album by Oscar Peterson, accompanied by an orchestra arranged by Russ Garcia.

== Track listing ==
1. "Ruby" (Mitchell Parish, Heinz Eric Roemheld) – 3:14
2. "Stars Fell on Alabama" (Parish, Frank Perkins) – 3:40
3. "Black Coffee" (Sonny Burke, Paul Francis Webster) – 2:17
4. "Laura" (Johnny Mercer, David Raksin) – 6:26
5. "The Boy Next Door" (Hugh Martin, Ralph Blane) – 2:19
6. "Our Waltz" (David Rose) – 2:54
7. "Tenderly" (Walter Gross, Jack Lawrence) – 3:53
8. "I Thought About You" (Jimmy Van Heusen, Mercer) – 2:19
9. "I Only Have Eyes for You" (Al Dubin, Harry Warren) – 2:46
10. "Stella by Starlight" (Ned Washington, Victor Young) – 3:27
11. "A Sunday Kind of Love" (Barbara Bell, Anita Leonard, Louis Prima, Stan Rhodes) – 3:32
12. "It Could Happen to You" (Johnny Burke, Van Heusen) – 3:45

== Personnel ==
=== Performance ===
- Oscar Peterson – piano
- Russ Garcia – arranger, conductor
