= On the Town =

On the Town may refer to:

- On the Town (musical), a 1944 musical with lyrics and book by Betty Comden and Adolph Green and music by Leonard Bernstein
- On the Town (film), a 1949 film based on the musical and starring Gene Kelly and Frank Sinatra
- On the Town with the Oscar Peterson Trio, a 1958 live album by Oscar Peterson
- On the Town (cast album), a 1993 live album
