= Only the Blues =

Studio album by Sonny Stitt
- Released: 1958
- Recorded: October 11, 1957
- Genre: Jazz
- Length: 75:03
- Label: Verve
- Producer: Norman Granz

Sonny Stitt chronology
Sonny Stitt with the New Yorkers (1957)	Only the Blues (1958)	Sonny Side Up (1957)

Professional ratings
Review scores
Source	Rating
Allmusic	3/5 stars

Only the Blues is a 1958 album by Sonny Stitt, accompanied by Roy Eldridge and Oscar Peterson.

== Track listing ==
1. "The String (The Eternal Triangle)" (Sonny Stitt) – 10:01
2. "Cleveland Blues" (Stitt) – 12:02
3. "B.W. Blues (Boogie Woogie Blues)" (Stitt) – 11:35
4. "Blues for Bags" (Stitt) – 10:39
  Studio outtakes included on the CD reissue:
5. "I Didn't Know What Time It Was" (Lorenz Hart, Richard Rodgers) – 3:31
6. "I Remember You" (Johnny Mercer, Victor Schertzinger) – 3:54
7. "I Know That You Know" (Anne Caldwell, Vincent Youmans) – 4:39
8. "I Know That You Know" (False Start) – 4:55
9. "I Know That You Know" – 4:47
10. "I Know That You Know" (Coda Rehearsal) – 3:19
11. "I Know That You Know" (Composite Master Take) – 4:43

A subsequent Fresh Sound CD issue gives tracks 5 and 6 plus I Know That You Know with only 1 alternate take.

== Personnel ==
=== Performance ===
- Sonny Stitt - alto saxophone
- Roy Eldridge - trumpet
- Oscar Peterson – piano
- Ray Brown – double bass
- Herb Ellis - guitar
- Stan Levey - drums
