= Oscar Peterson Plays My Fair Lady =

Studio album by Oscar Peterson
- Released: 1958
- Genre: Jazz
- Label: Verve
- Producer: Norman Granz

Oscar Peterson chronology
Jazz Giants '58 (1958)	Oscar Peterson Plays My Fair Lady (1958)	On the Town with the Oscar Peterson Trio (1958)

Oscar Peterson Plays My Fair Lady, also released as The Oscar Peterson Trio Swings "My Fair Lady", is a 1958 album by pianist Oscar Peterson of compositions written by the songwriting duo Lerner and Loewe. The selections are from the musical My Fair Lady.

== Reception ==
Professional ratings
Review scores
Source	Rating
AllMusic	3/5 stars
The Penguin Guide to Jazz Recordings	3.5/4 stars

In his AllMusic review, Scott Yanow wrote that "the pianist and his sidemen uplift those melodies with their usual swinging treatment. Overall the music on this reissue is consistently enjoyable."

== Track listing ==
1. "On the Street Where You Live"
2. "I Could Have Danced All Night"
3. "Show Me"
4. "Get Me to the Church on Time"
5. "Wouldn't It Be Loverly?"
6. "I've Grown Accustomed to Her Face"
7. "The Rain in Spain"

== Personnel ==
- Oscar Peterson – piano
- Ray Brown – double bass
- Gene Gammage – drums
