= Big Swing Face (Buddy Rich Big Band album) =

Live album by Buddy Rich
- Released: June 1967
- Recorded: February 22–25 and March 10, 1967
- Venue: Chez Club, Los Angeles, California
- Genre: Jazz
- Length: 36:16
- Label: Pacific Jazz
- Producer: Richard Bock

Buddy Rich chronology
The Sounds of '66 (1966)	Big Swing Face (1967)	The New One! (1968)

Professional ratings
Review scores
Source	Rating
Allmusic	3/5 stars
The Penguin Guide to Jazz Recordings	3/4 stars

Big Swing Face is a 1967 live album by the Buddy Rich Big Band. Its "The Beat Goes On" is a feature for Buddy Rich's daughter Cathy, whose vocal performance was overdubbed at United Recording in Hollywood. A reissue in 1996 doubles the listing with nine unreleased performances from the same engagement at the Chez Club in Hollywood.

== Track listing ==
LP side A:

1. "Norwegian Wood (This Bird Has Flown)" (John Lennon, Paul McCartney) – 2:57
2. "Big Swing Face" (Bill Potts) – 5:15
3. "Monitor Theme" (Bernie Baum, Bill Giant, Florence Kaye) – 2:24
4. "Wack Wack" (Isaac "Redd" Holt, Donald Storball, Hysear Don Walker, Jimmy Young) – 3:04
5. "Love for Sale" (Cole Porter) – 4:30

LP side B:

1. "Mexicali Nose" (Harry Betts) – 2:49
2. "Willowcrest" (Bob Florence) – 4:55
3. "The Beat Goes On" (Sonny Bono) – 4:40
4. "Bugle Call Rag" (Billy Meyers, Jack Pettis, Elmer Schoebel) – 4:42

Bonus tracks on 1996 CD reissue:

10. "Standing Up in a Hammock" (Potts) – 2:32
11. "Chicago" (Fred Fisher) – 2:47
12. "Lament for Lester" (Jay Corre) – 2:30
13. "Machine" (Bill Reddie) – 3:45
14. "Silver Threads Among the Blues" (Don Piestrup) – 4:40
15. "New Blues" (Piestrup) – 4:38
16. "Old Timey" (Bob Florence) – 3:25
17. "Loose" (Bill Holman) – 4:05
18. "Apples (a.k.a. Gino)" (Arthur M. Wiggins) – 2:35

== Personnel ==
=== Musicians ===
- Quinn Davis – alto saxophone
- Ernie Watts – alto saxophone and flute
- Jay Corre, Robert Keller – tenor saxophone and flute
- Marty Flax – baritone saxophone
- Bobby Shew, Yoshito Murakami, Charles Findley, John Scottile – trumpet
- Jim Trimble, John Boice – trombone
- Bill Wimberly – bass trombone
- Richie Resnicoff – guitar
- Ray Starling – piano
- James Gannon – double bass
- Buddy Rich – drums
- Cathy Rich – vocals
- Shorty Rogers – arranger: "Wack, Wack" and "The Beat Goes On"
