= Award Winner: Stan Getz =

Studio album by Stan Getz
- Released: 1959
- Recorded: August 2, 1957
- Studio: Hollywood
- Genre: Jazz
- Length: 74:16
- Label: Verve
- Producer: Norman Granz

Stan Getz chronology
The Soft Swing (1957)	Award Winner: Stan Getz (1959)	Stan Getz and the Oscar Peterson Trio (1957)

Professional ratings
Review scores
Source	Rating
AllMusic	3/5 stars
The Penguin Guide to Jazz Recordings	3.5/4 stars

Award Winner: Stan Getz is a 1957 album by Stan Getz.

== Track listing ==
1. "Where or When" (Lorenz Hart, Richard Rodgers) – 7:11
2. "Woody 'n' You" (Dizzy Gillespie) – 7:08
3. "Smiles" (J. Will Callahan, Lee Roberts) – 4:48
4. "Three Little Words" (Bert Kalmar, Harry Ruby) – 6:59
5. "Time After Time" (Sammy Cahn, Jule Styne) – 6:45
6. "This Can't Be Love" (Hart, Rodgers) – 9:19
7. "All God's Chillun Got Rhythm" (Walter Jurmann, Gus Kahn, Bronisław Kaper) – 7:42 bonus track on the CD
8. "But Beautiful" (Johnny Burke, Jimmy Van Heusen) – 5:31 bonus track on the CD

Studio outtakes included on the 2000 CD reissue:

1. "Woody 'n' You" (alternate take) – 7:10
2. "Time After Time" (alternate take) – 6:57
3. "All God's Chillun Got Rhythm" (false start) – :34
4. "Smiles" (false start) – :20
5. "Time After Time" (false start) – :42
6. "Woody 'n' You" (false start) – :27
7. "Woody 'n' You" (inserts) – 2:43

== Personnel ==
- Stan Getz – tenor saxophone
- Lou Levy – piano
- Leroy Vinnegar – double bass
- Stan Levey – drums
