= I'm a Woman (song) =

Original song written and composed by Jerry Leiber, Mike Stoller

Single by Peggy Lee

from the album I'm a Woman
- B-side: "Big Bad Bill (Is Sweet William Now)"
- Released: November 1962
- Recorded: November 1962
- Genre: Blues
- Length: 2:07
- Label: Capitol Records
- Songwriter: Leiber & Stoller
- Producer: Dave Cavanaugh

Peggy Lee singles chronology
"Tell All the World About You" (1962)	"I'm a Woman" (1962)	"The Alley Cat Song" (1963)

"I'm a Woman"

Single by Maria Muldaur

from the album Waitress in a Donut Shop
- B-side: "Cool River"
- Released: December 1974
- Label: Reprise Records
- Songwriter: Leiber & Stoller
- Producers: Lenny Waronker, Joe Boyd

Maria Muldaur singles chronology
"Midnight at the Oasis" (1974)	"I'm a Woman" (1974)	"Gringo en Mexico" (1975)

The song "I'm a Woman" was written by famed songwriting duo Jerry Leiber and Mike Stoller, and was first recorded in 1962 by Christine Kittrell.

== Popular recordings ==
- It was recorded and released as a single later that year by Peggy Lee, reaching number 54 on U.S. pop charts. It was also the title song to Lee's 1963 album I'm a Woman, and appeared on her subsequent albums In Love Again! (1964) and Is That All There Is? (1969).
- There were two covers by Maria Muldaur; first with Jim Kweskin's Jug Band in the mid-1960s, then again as a solo performer in 1974. The latter reached number 12 on U.S. pop charts, and was Muldaur's only hit other than her signature song "Midnight at the Oasis".

== Other recordings ==
The song has been covered many times:

- Fontella Bass recorded it for her 1966 album The New Look
- Bette Midler recorded the song from her Peggy Lee tribute album Bette Midler Sings the Peggy Lee Songbook
- Country legend Reba McEntire recorded the song for her 1979 album Out of a Dream.
- Nanette Workman recorded it for her 2001 Roots 'n' Blues album.
- Elisa Girlando and Out of Truth released a version in 2008.
- Country star Wynonna Judd recorded it for her 2009 album Sing: Chapter 1.
- A female ensemble version of "I'm a Woman" was included in 1995's Leiber & Stoller-themed musical revue Smokey Joe's Cafe.
- Brian May recorded a version with English band Woman and Kerry Ellis in 2020 as a charity single to help Breast Cancer Awareness Month. May also produced the single.
- Early 1970s pop group Fancy recorded it for their 1974 debut album Fancy.
- Kristin Chenoweth recorded the song for her 2019 album For the Girls.
- Ngaiire recorded a version of the song in 2024 for the TV show Ladies in Black

== Popular culture ==
- A duet by Raquel Welch and Miss Piggy from the former's appearance on The Muppet Show, with Raquel spelling the first two letters from the word "Woman" (W O) while Miss Piggy ended it with the letters "P I G";
- Raquel Welch and Cher performed the song on the Cher show in 1975.
- A rendition of the Leiber & Stoller version was performed by Jane Krakowski, Vonda Shepard, and Lisa Nicole Carson in an episode of Ally McBeal. Later, Lucy Liu and Portia de Rossi lip-sync the song in a further episode of Ally McBeal.
- There were two performances by Melinda Doolittle on season 6 of American Idol.
- Beverly Hillbillies star Irene Ryan (in her Granny persona) performed an adaptation of the song on The Hollywood Palace on ABC-TV in 1969.
- The song, with modified lyrics, was used in Enjoli perfume commercials of the 1970s.
- In 2013, Jennifer Love Hewitt released a new version of the song to promote her Lifetime TV show The Client List. The video reached the top 10 in the iTunes Music Video chart.

== Chart history ==
Peggy Lee

Chart (1962–63)	Peak position
U.S. Billboard Hot 100	54
U.S. Cash Box Top 100	75

Maria Muldaur

Chart (1974–75)	Peak position
Australia (Kent Music Report)	25
Canada RPM Adult Contemporary	2
Canada RPM Top Singles	41
U.S. Billboard Hot 100	12
U.S. Billboard Adult Contemporary	4
U.S. Cash Box Top 100	24
