= Jump for Joy =

Jump for Joy may refer to:

- Jump for Joy (1941 revue), a musical by Duke Ellington
- Jump for Joy (Cannonball Adderley album), 1958
- Jump for Joy (Peggy Lee album), 1958
- Jump for Joy (Joe Williams album), 1963
- Jump for Joy (Bobby Short album), 1970
- Jump for Joy (Koko Taylor album), 1990
- "Jump for Joy" (My Name Is Earl), a 2006 episode
- "Jump for Joy" (song), a 1996 song by 2 Unlimited
- "Jump for Joy", a 1975 song by the Biddu Orchestra

== See also ==
- Jumping for Joy, a 1956 British comedy film
