= Town Tavern =

Jazz club in Toronto (1949–1971)

Town Tavern, Toronto

The Town Tavern was a jazz club in Toronto, Ontario that operated from 1949 to 1971. The club was one of the city's preeminent jazz venues and a regular performance venue for pianist Oscar Peterson.

== History ==
The Town Tavern was located in the Alton Building at 14-16 Queen Street E, which was built in 1922 and was designed by architects William Steels & Sons.

Owned by Sam Berger, the Town Tavern was one of Toronto's busiest jazz clubs throughout the 1950s and 1960s. In July 1958, Oscar Peterson recorded a live album on the Verve label from the Tavern, featuring his then trio composed of Herb Ellis and Ray Brown. The venue closed in 1972. The building in which the Tavern operated was later demolished, and remained a vacant lot until the current office building, 2 Queen Street East, was completed in 2003.

== Live recordings ==
- Oscar Peterson - On the Town with the Oscar Peterson Trio (1958)
