= My Personal Property =

Studio album by Bobby Short
- Released: 1963
- Recorded: June 1963
- Genre: Jazz, traditional pop
- Label: Atlantic SD1689

Bobby Short chronology
Bobby Short on the East Side (1960)	My Personal Property (1963)	Jump for Joy (1969)

My Personal Property is a 1963 album by American singer Bobby Short of songs composed by Cy Coleman.

== Personnel ==
- Bobby Short – vocals, piano
- Beverly Peer – double bass
- Dick Sheridan – drums (all tracks except "My Personal Property")
- Gene Gammage – drums on "My Personal Property"
- Valdo Ramirez, Willie Rodriguez – percussion
