= Jelly man =

Jelly man may refer to:

- "Jelly Man", a song from The Dynamic Sound Patterns, by Rod Levitt
- "The Jelly Man", an episode of Dixon of Dock Green
- Kelly Moran (speedway rider), nicknamed "Jelly Man"
