= Ellis in Wonderland =

Studio album by Herb Ellis
- Released: February 1956
- Recorded: December 1955 – January 1956
- Studio: Hollywood, California
- Genre: Jazz
- Length: 36:39
- Label: Norgran
- Producer: Ken Druker

Herb Ellis chronology
Ellis in Wonderland (1956)	Nothing but the Blues (1957)

Professional ratings
Review scores
Source	Rating
AllMusic	4/5 stars
The Penguin Guide to Jazz Recordings	3/4 stars

Ellis in Wonderland is the debut album by jazz guitarist Herb Ellis, accompanied by the Oscar Peterson trio, trumpeter Harry "Sweets" Edison, and saxophonists Charlie Mariano and Jimmy Giuffre.

== Track listing ==
No.	Title	Length
1.	"Sweetheart Blues" (Ellis)	4:46
2.	"Somebody Loves Me" (Buddy DeSylva/George Gershwin/Ballard MacDonald)	4:55
3.	"It Could Happen to You" (Johnny Burke/Jimmy Van Heusen)	3:47
4.	"Pogo" (Ellis)	4:45
5.	"Detour Ahead" (Ellis/Lou Carter/Johnny Frigo)	4:03
6.	"Ellis in Wonderland" (Ellis)	3:52
7.	"Have You Met Miss Jones?" (Richard Rodgers/Lorenz Hart)	6:20
8.	"A Simple Tune" (Jimmy Giuffre)	4:11

== Personnel ==
- Herb Ellis – guitar
- Harry "Sweets" Edison – trumpet
- Charlie Mariano – alto saxophone
- Jimmy Giuffre – baritone saxophone, tenor saxophone, clarinet
- Oscar Peterson – piano
- Ray Brown – double bass
- Alvin Stoller – drums
