= Rod Levitt =

American jazz musician

Rodney Charles Levitt (September 16, 1929 in Portland, Oregon – May 8, 2007 in Wardsboro, Vermont) was an American jazz trombonist, composer, and bandleader.

Levitt studied composition at the University of Washington, where he took his BA in 1951. He was in the orchestra at Radio City Music Hall from 1957 to 1963, and played with Dizzy Gillespie (1956–57), Ernie Wilkins (1957), Kai Winding (1958), and Sy Oliver (1959-60), and also worked with Gil Evans in 1959 when his orchestra accompanied Miles Davis. In 1960, he played with Gerry Mulligan and Mundell Lowe, with Quincy Jones in 1961, and with Oliver Nelson in 1962. He recorded four albums as a leader of an octet in 1963-6 and continued to work with this combination into the 1970s, when he also played with bassist Chuck Israels. Later in his career he worked with Cedar Walton and Blue Mitchell, and wrote music for commercials with a company he ran from 1966-1989. In the late 1970s he taught at Fairleigh Dickinson, Hofstra University, CUNY, and Hunter College.

He died of Alzheimer's in Wardsboro, aged 77.

== Discography ==
=== As leader ===
- The Dynamic Sound Patterns - Riverside RLP 471 (1963)
- Insight - RCA Victor LPM 3372 (1964)
- Solid Ground - RCA Victor LPM 3448 (1965)
- 42nd Street - RCA Victor LPM 3615 (1966)

=== As sideman ===
With Dizzy Gillespie

- World Statesman (Norgran, 1956)
- Dizzy in Greece (Verve, 1957)
- Birks' Works (Verve, 1957)

With Mundell Lowe

- Themes from Mr. Lucky, the Untouchables and Other TV Action Jazz (RCA Camden, 1960)

With Cedar Walton

- Beyond Mobius (RCA, 1976) - arranger and conductor

With Kai Winding

- Dance to the City Beat (Columbia, 1959)
