= Jazz/Concord =

Studio album by Herb Ellis, Joe Pass
- Released: 1973
- Genre: Jazz, Bebop
- Length: 36:44
- Label: Concord Jazz
- Producer: Carl Jefferson

Joe Pass chronology
Intercontinental (1970)	Jazz/Concord (1973)	Virtuoso (1973)

Jazz/Concord is a studio album by jazz guitarists Herb Ellis and Joe Pass, recorded at Wally Heider Studios, Los Angeles, California, and released in 1973. It was the first recording issued by Concord Records.

== Reception ==
Professional ratings
Review scores
Source	Rating
Allmusic	4/5 stars
The Rolling Stone Jazz Record Guide	3/5 stars

In his Allmusic review, critic Scott Yanow wrote that the quartet "always made for a perfectly complementary team, constantly challenging each other. The boppish music... is quite enjoyable with the more memorable tunes including "Look for the Silver Lining," "Honeysuckle Rose," "Georgia," "Good News Blues," and "Bad News Blues." This was a strong start for what would become the definitive mainstream jazz label."

== Track listing ==
1. "Look for the Silver Lining" (Buddy DeSylva, Jerome Kern) – 4:47
2. "Shadow of Your Smile" (Johnny Mandel, Paul Francis Webster) – 2:30
3. "Good News Blues" (Herb Ellis) – 3:22
4. "Honeysuckle Rose" (Fats Waller, Andy Razaf) – 3:07
5. "Happiness is the Concord Jazz Festival" (Ray Brown) – 3:54
6. "Stuffy" (Coleman Hawkins) – 5:07
7. "Georgia on My Mind" (Hoagy Carmichael, Stuart Gorrell) – 5:24
8. "Love for Sale" (Cole Porter) – 3:48
9. "Bad News Blues" (Ellis) – 5:17

== Personnel ==
- Herb Ellis – guitar
- Joe Pass – guitar
- Ray Brown – double bass
- Jake Hanna – drums
