= Swingin' New Big Band =

Live album by Buddy Rich
- Released: 1966
- Recorded: 1966
- Genre: Jazz
- Length: 36:45
- Label: Pacific Jazz
- Producer: Richard Bock

Buddy Rich chronology
Are You Ready for This? (1965)	Swingin' New Big Band (1966)	The Sounds of '66 (1966)

1981 LP re-issue
- Pacific Jazz LN 10089

Professional ratings
Review scores
Source	Rating
Allmusic	4/5 stars
The Penguin Guide to Jazz Recordings	3.5/4 stars

Swingin' New Big Band is a 1966 live album by Buddy Rich and his big band.

== Track listing ==
LP side A:

1. "Ready Mix" (Bill Holman) – 3:22
2. "Basically Blues" (Phil Wilson) – 5:39
3. "Critic's Choice" (Oliver Nelson) – 3:28
4. "My Man's Gone Now" (George Gershwin, Ira Gershwin, DuBose Heyward) – 3:05
5. "Uptight (Everything's Alright)" (Henry Cosby, Sylvia Moy, Stevie Wonder) – 2:49

LP side B:

1. "Sister Sadie" (Horace Silver) – 3:15
2. "More Soul" (King Curtis, Nelson) – 4:19
3. West Side Story Medley (Leonard Bernstein, Stephen Sondheim) – 10:48
  1. "Overture"
  2. "Cool"
  3. "Something's Coming"
  4. "Somewhere"

9 bonus tracks added to 1996 CD re-issue:

9. "What'd I Say" (Ray Charles) – 2:56
10. "Hoe Down" (Nelson) – 2:47
11. "Step Right Up" (Nelson) – 3:17
12. "Apples (a.k.a. Gino)" (Arthur M. Wiggins) – 2:32
13. "Chicago (That Toddlin' Town)" (Fred Fisher) – 2:26
14. "In a Mellow Tone" (Duke Ellington) – 3:47
15. "Never Will I Marry" (Frank Loesser) – 2:40
16. "Lament for Lester" (Jay Corre) – 2:45
17. "Naptown Blues" (Wes Montgomery) – 3:29

== Personnel ==
The Buddy Rich big band

- Gene Quill – alto saxophone, clarinet
- Peter Yellin – alto saxophone, flute
- Jay Corre, Martin Flax – tenor saxophone, clarinet, flute
- Stephen Perlow – baritone saxophone, bass clarinet
- Robert Shew, John Sottile, Yoshito Murakami, Walter Battegello – trumpet
- Jim Trimble, John Boice – trombone
- Dennis Good, Mike Waverley – bass trombone
- John Bunch – piano
- Barry Zweig – guitar
- Carson Smith – bass
- Buddy Rich – drums

Arrangers

- Bill Holman
- Oliver Nelson
- Don Piestrup
- Don Rader
- Bill Reddie
- Arthur M. Wiggins
- Phil Wilson
- Jay Corre
- John Boice

Production

- Richard Bock – producer
- Woody Woodward – art direction
- Wally Heider – engineer
- Leonard Feather, Stan Kenton – liner notes
- Fred Felgio – photography
- Dean Pratt – producer, liner notes, reissue producer
- Bob Belden – CD reissue producer
