= Gene Gammage =

American jazz drummer (born 1931)

- Birth name: Eugene Gammage Jr
- Born: January 30, 1931; Atlanta, Georgia. U.S.
- Genres: Jazz
- Occupation: Musician
- Instrument: drums

Eugene "Gene" Gammage (born January 30, 1931) is an American jazz drummer.

== Biography ==
Gene Gammage began his professional career as a drummer in 1952 after serving in the Air Force (1948-1952). In 1953, in Los Angeles he found a steady gig with Teddy Charles, and Bill Crow on bass. Following this, he played with leaders Buddy Collette (1955) Hampton Hawes (1955), André Previn (1955), Barney Kessel (1956), Herb Geller, Jack Sheldon. Tenor saxophonist Jack Laird hired him for an engagement at Club El Sereno in East LA (with pianist Franck Patchen). Peterson described Gammage as "a young man with an irrepressible sense of humour", "who possessed considerable talent." In November 1956, he was in Las Vegas with Oscar Peterson. In 1957, he joined Beverly Kelly and Pat Moran McCoy for a quartet and trio including Scott LaFaro. Two albums were recorded and issued in 1958 under the two leaders' names. From fall 1958 to Spring 1959, he was hired again by Oscar Peterson. The trio, with Ray Brown on bass, recorded a jazz version of My Fair Lady on November, 20&21 1958. In St Louis in August 1961, he recorded 3 live dates with Webster Young, Shirley Horn, and Johnny Hartman.

A New York resident in the late sixties, he took part in Roswell Rudd's Primordial group, with Enrico Rava (no official recording)

On November 2 1971, he was with Gary McFarland and writer, editor David Burnett at Club 55 in New York City, when they got served drinks filled with liquid methadone, which provoked seizure due to overdose. Gary McFarland was pronounced dead in the bar, David Burnett just a few days later. Gene Gammage survived after some time in the hospital. He appeared in This is McFarland, film by Kristian St Clair released in 2006.

From the mid-seventies to the early eighties, his last known regular gig was with Bobby Short.

On page 220 of Oscar Peterson's memoir "A Jazz Odyssey," he stated that Gammage died in 1989.

His recordings mostly feature him with piano-led trio and show an accomplished accompanist, with a solid tempo and technicality, typical of the drumming style in the mid-fifties. In 1960 Leonard Feather mentioned his original influences as Max Roach, Kenny Clarke, Philly Joe Jones, Art Blakey, Elvin Jones

== Discography ==
Original album names

- The Jack Sheldon Quartet - Get Out Of Town (Jazz: West, 1954)
- Jack Sheldon - The Quartet & The Quintet (Jazz: West, 1956)
- Beverly Kelly - Sings with Pat Moran Trio (Audio Fidelity, 1958)
- Pat Moran Trio - This Is Pat Moran (Audio Fidelity, 1958)
- Oscar Peterson - Plays My Fair Lady (Verve Records, 1958)
- Shirley Horn - "Live" At The GasLight (Can-Am Records, 1961) (originally titled "Live" At The Village Vanguard)
- Webster Young - Plays And Sings The Miles Davis Songbook (Volume Three) (VGM Records, rec. in 1961)
- Johnny Hartman And The Andrew Hill Trio - Sittin' In With Johnny Hartman And The Andrew Hill Trio (VGM Records, rec. in 1961)
- Bobby Short - My Personal Property (Atlantic, 1976)

Various reissues and compilations

- Oscar Peterson Trio - Night Train Vol. 2 (LP, Comp) (Verve Records, 1967)
- Oscar Peterson Trio - Oscar's Oscar Peterson Plays The Academy Awards (Verve Records, 1969)
- Oscar Peterson - Plays West Side Story & My Fair Lady (LP, Comp) (VSP, 1969)
- Oscar Peterson - Wouldn't It Be Loverly? Oscar Peterson Plays Broadway (Verve Records 1994)
- Oscar Peterson - Soft Sands (CD, Comp) (Phoenix Records, 2013)
- Pat Moran: Complete Trio Sessions (Fresh Sound Records, 2007) is a reissue of the two Audio Fidelity sessions from 1958.
- The Legendary Scott LaFaro (Japan, Teichiku, 1978) is a partial reissue of This Is Pat Moran

== Filmography ==
- Bobby Short At The Café Carlyle -The Great Saloon Singer Of Manhattan Bobby Short by Director Lou Tyrell - A LeaLou Production - 1979
- This is McFarland documentary by Kristian St Clair released in 2006.
