= For Musicians Only =

Studio album by Dizzy Gillespie, Stan Getz and Sonny Stitt
- Released: 1957
- Recorded: October 16, 1956
- Studios: Radio Recorders, Hollywood, California
- Genre: Jazz
- Length: 42:59 original LP
- Labels: Verve; MGV 8198
- Producer: Norman Granz

Dizzy Gillespie chronology
Dizzy in Greece (1957)	For Musicians Only (1957)	Dizzy Gillespie and Stuff Smith (1957)

Stan Getz chronology
Stan Getz in Stockholm (1955)	For Musicians Only (1956)	The Steamer (1956)

Sonny Stitt chronology
New York Jazz (1956)	For Musicians Only (1956)	37 Minutes and 48 Seconds with Sonny Stitt (1957)

Professional ratings
Review scores
Source	Rating
AllMusic	4.5/5 stars
Disc	5/5 stars
The Penguin Guide to Jazz Recordings	2.5/4 stars

For Musicians Only is a 1957 jazz album by Dizzy Gillespie, Stan Getz and Sonny Stitt incorporating bebop influences.

Recorded in Los Angeles, California on October 16, 1956, it has been described as the "real thing, no pretense". Bob Levey, son of drummer Stan Levey, told an interviewer how his father described the session:

The story behind this from my dad's point of view is that everything was done in one take--no 2nd takes, no overdubbing. He had spent the whole day recording for TV shows, so he thought 'a date with Stan Getz...this should be pretty laid back'. Well nothing could be further from the truth, he said. "The count-offs were breathtaking, but once they got thru Bebop, everything settled down". His favorite was Wee (Allen's Alley). It was virtually a live, real bebop session, nothing worked out, just play by the seat of your pants or get off the bandstand. Like it or not that was the way it was with Bird and those cats, the real thing no pretense.

The album is known for the front line's winding, intricate solos. This has led to praise for the back line, particularly bassist Ray Brown, for keeping some semblance of the original tune going behind the solos.

== Track listing ==
=== Side A ===
1. "Bebop" (Gillespie) – 12:48
2. "We (My Honey And Me)" (Al Sherman, Charles Tobias, Harry Woods) – 8:28

=== Side B ===
1. "Dark Eyes" (Traditional) – 12:10
2. "Lover Come Back to Me" (Sigmund Romberg, Oscar Hammerstein II) – 9:33

CD bonus track

5. "Dark Eyes" [alternate take] – 9:50

== Personnel ==
- Dizzy Gillespie – trumpet
- Sonny Stitt – alto saxophone
- Stan Getz – tenor saxophone
- John Lewis – piano
- Herb Ellis – guitar
- Ray Brown – bass
- Stan Levey – drums
