= The Soft Swing =

Studio album by Stan Getz Quartet
- Released: 1959
- Recorded: July 12, 1957; New York City
- Genre: Jazz
- Length: 33:42
- Label: Verve; MGV 8321
- Producer: Norman Granz

Stan Getz chronology
The Steamer (1956)	The Soft Swing (1959)	Award Winner: Stan Getz (1957)

The Soft Swing is an album by saxophonist Stan Getz and recorded in 1957 and first released on the Verve label. According to the liner notes by Stewart Clay on a 2016 CD re-release, it was the only studio session in which Getz collaborated with Mose Allison, although some Mutual broadcasts from the Village Vanguard and the Red Hill Inn (Pennsauken, New Jersey) are included as bonus tracks of the re-release. "Although none of Allison's compositions are played here", wrote jazz critic Alun Morgan about The Soft Swing, "Mose's George Wallington-like solos add piquancy to the occasion (During Allison's term of service with Getz, the tenor man used to play several of his tunes and reserved one for the noisy customers. He would announce 'We will now play a number by our pianist, 'Ain't You a Mess', glaring at the conversationalists as he spoke the words of the tune title"). Such an instance can be heard on the broadcast track that closes our CD [the 2016 Phono re-release], on which Stan Getz sits out, which is 'Ain't You a Mess'."

The original liner notes by Nat Hentoff, co-editor of The Jazz Review (and reproduced on the 2016 re-release), claim that Getz was "at an unusually provocative stage in his career" and had developed "a style that was clearly his own". However, in the 2016 liner note quote from Morgan, Morgan noted a Lester Young influence on all tracks that he felt was more strong than previously and particularly on "To the Ends of the Earth". "The twelve-bar 'Down Beat' commences, rather unusually, with stop chords while Kern's much-played 'All the Things You Are' is taken slower than we have come to expect in recent years". The original liner notes indicate: "All elements of... [Getz's] style -- tone, time, phrasing and conception -- complemented each other logically. The result was an organic completeness in his musical... personality, that is relatively rare in jazz.... The only significant change in Getz's work in the past five years has not been a change in his essential style so much as a strengthening and deepening of it in emotional and rhythmic terms".

The 2016 liner notes also quote from a 2010 JazzWax interview by Marc Myers:

JazzWax: In 1956, how did you meet Stan Getz?
Mose Allison: I used to go to these jam sessions at night at a loft on 34th St. that belonged to trombonist Clyde Cox. Many of the guys who were there were from the South. At these sessions, I met drummer Frank Isola, who put me in touch with Stan.
JW: How did you get along with Getz?
MA: Just fine. No problems. I worked off and on with him. He was a great player. I made one album with him and bassist Addison Farmer and drummer Jerry Segal. It was The Soft Swing in 1957. I didn't have to adapt to Stan's style. He liked me as I was.

Professional ratings
Review scores
Source	Rating
Allmusic	3/5 stars

== Track listing ==
All compositions by Stan Getz, except as indicated

1. "All the Things You Are" (Jerome Kern, Oscar Hammerstein II) - 7:35
2. "Pocono Mac" - 8:36
3. "Down Beat" - 4:45
4. "To the Ends of the Earth" (George Duning) - 6:31
5. "Bye Bye Blues" (David Bennett, Chauncey Gray, Fred Hamm, Bert Lown) - 6:15

Bonus tracks

6. "All God's Children Got Rhythm" (Walter Jurmann, Bronislaw Kaper, Gus Kahn) - 6:03 Bonus track on 2016 CD reissue by Phono
7. "Flamingo" (Ted Grouya, Edmund Anderson) - 4:18 Bonus track on 2016 CD reissue by Phono
8. "Is It True What They Say About Dixie?" (Irving Caesar, Sammy Lerner, Gerald Marks) - 3:27 Bonus track on 2016 CD reissue by Phono
9. "Time After Time" (Jule Styne, Sammy Cahn) - 5:00 Bonus track on 2016 CD reissue by Phono
10. "To the Ends of the Earth #2" (Noel Sherman, Joe Sherman) - 4:20 Bonus track on 2016 CD reissue by Phono
11. "Stars Fell on Alabama" (Frank Perkins, Mitchell Parish) - 4:03 Bonus track on 2016 CD reissue by Phono
12. "Polka Dots and Moonbeams" (Johnny Burke, Jimmy Van Heusen) - 3:36 Bonus track on 2016 CD reissue by Phono
13. "Bronx Blues (Theme) - 0:36 Bonus track on 2016 CD reissue by Phono
14. "Jordu (Duke Jordan) - 3:57 Bonus track on 2016 CD reissue by Phono
15. "Lover Man" (Jimmy Davis, Roger "Ram" Ramirez, James Sherman) - 4:45 Bonus track on 2016 CD reissue by Phono
16. "Ain't You a Mess" (Mose Allison) - 2:44 Bonus track on CD reissue by Phono

== Personnel ==
On the original album (tracks 1–5):

- Stan Getz - tenor saxophone
- Mose Allison - piano
- Addison Farmer - bass
- Jerry Segal - drums

On the 2016 CD reissue by Phono: Tracks 6 and 7 (from Mutual broadcast from the Village Vanguard, New York City, New York, June 29, 1957):

Same as tracks 1–5.

On the 2016 CD reissue by Phono: Tracks 8, 9, 10, and 11 (from Mutual broadcast from the Village Vanguard, New York City, New York, June 22, 1957):

- Stan Getz - tenor saxophone
- Mose Allison - piano
- Jug Taylor - bass
- Fred Benito - drums

On the 2016 CD reissue by Phono: Track 12 (from Mutual broadcast from the Red Hill Inn, Pennsauken, New Jersey, February 16, 1957):

- Stan Getz - tenor saxophone
- Mose Allison - piano
- Willie Stump Jr. - bass
- Frank Isola - drums

On the 2016 CD reissue by Phono: Tracks 13, 14, 15, and 16 (from Mutual broadcast from the Red Hill Inn, Pennsauken, New Jersey, May 18, 1957):

- Stan Getz - tenor saxophone
- Mose Allison - piano
- Jug Taylor - bass
- Paul Motian - drums
