= Remo Palmier =

American jazz guitarist

- Birth name: Remo Paul Palmieri
- Born: March 29, 1923; New York City, New York, U.S.
- Died: February 2, 2002 (aged 78); New York City, New York, U.S.
- Genres: Jazz
- Occupation: Musician
- Instrument: Guitar
- Labels: Concord

Remo Paul Palmier (March 29, 1923 – February 2, 2002) was an American jazz guitarist.

== Career ==
Palmier began his career as a musician during the 1940s, and collaborated with Coleman Hawkins, Dizzy Gillespie, Charlie Parker, and Teddy Wilson. In 1945, he was awarded a "new star" award from Esquire (magazine). He also played with Pearl Bailey, Billie Holiday, and Sarah Vaughan. He also became part of Nat Jaffe's trio.

In 1945, he began performing with Arthur Godfrey on CBS Radio and taught Godfrey to play the ukulele. He was with the Godfrey show for twenty-seven years. He changed his name legally in 1952 to Palmier, omitting the "i" at the end, to avoid being confused with Eddie Palmieri.

When the Godfrey show was canceled in 1972, Palmier returned to playing clubs in New York. In 1977, his friend Herb Ellis convinced Carl Jefferson to invite Palmier to the Concord Jazz Festival in Concord, California. At the festival, Palmier and Ellis performed as a duo. Later that year, they recorded Windflower, which ended Palmier's thirty-year hiatus from recording. In 1979, Concord Jazz produced Remo Palmier, the only album on which he was billed as the leader.

During the 1970s, he played with Benny Goodman and Dick Hyman. He participated in an all-star Swing Reunion in 1985 and in tribute concerts to Barney Kessel (1997), Herb Ellis (1998), and Tal Farlow (1996). He taught privately and his students included cartoonist Gary Larson.

== Death ==
He died in 2002 from leukemia and lymphoma.

== Discography ==
=== As leader ===
- Windflower with Herb Ellis (Concord Jazz, 1978)
- Remo Palmier (Concord Jazz, 1979)

=== As sideman ===
- Louis Armstrong, Town Hall Concert Plus (RCA, 1957)
- Louie Bellson, Louie Bellson and His Jazz Orchestra (Musicmasters, 1987)
- Ruby Braff, Pretties (Sonet, 1978)
- Benny Carter, Central City Sketches (Musicmasters, 1987)
- Benny Carter, Harlem Renaissance (MusicMaster, 1992)
- Cozy Cole, Red Norvo, Jazz Giants Vol. 3 (Trip Jazz, 1978)
- Dizzy Gillespie, Groovin' High (Savoy, 1955)
- Arthur Godfrey, Jazz for the People (Signature, 1960)
- Coleman Hawkins, Thanks for the Memory (Xanadu, 1983)
- Lou McGarity, Lou McGarity: In Celebration (IAJRC, 1981)
- Max Morath, Jonah Man and Other Songs of the Bert Williams Era (Vanguard, 1976)
- Max Morath, The Ragtime Women (Vanguard, 1977)
- Max Morath, Dick Sudhalter, In Jazz Country (Vanguard, 1979)
- Red Norvo, Town Hall Concert Vol. 1 (London, 1974)
- Sarah Vaughan, It's You or No One (Musicraft, 1988)
- Teddy Wilson, Teddy Wilson & His All Star Jazz Sextette (Allegro, 1956)
