= Stan Levey =

American drummer (1926–2005)

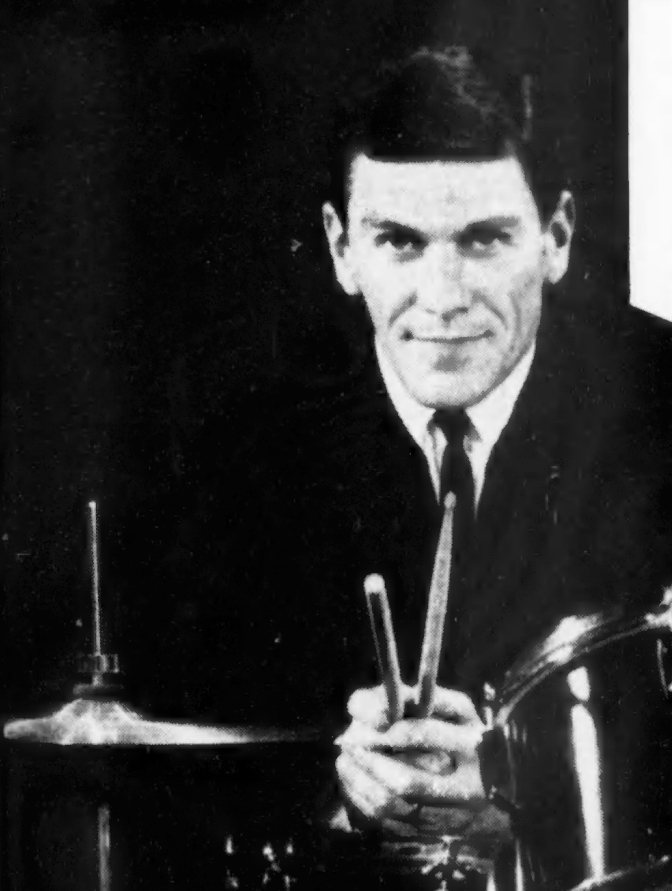
- Levey in a 1961 advertisement

Background information
- Born: Adolph Stanley Levey; April 5, 1926; Philadelphia, Pennsylvania; United States
- Died: April 19, 2005 (aged 79) Van Nuys, California; United States
- Genres: Jazz, bebop
- Occupations: Musician, composer
- Instrument: Drums
- Years active: 1942–1973
- Labels: Bethlehem, Mode, Liberty Records
- Formerly of: Dizzy Gillespie, Charlie Parker, Coleman Hawkins, Art Tatum, Ben Webster, Dexter Gordon, Erroll Garner, Miles Davis, George Shearing, Lester Young, Roy Eldridge, Zoot Sims, Al Cohn, Stan Getz, John Lewis, Ray Brown, Sonny Stitt, Barney Bigard, Gerry Mulligan, Vince Guaraldi, Lee Konitz, Bud Shank, Charlie Ventura, Scott LaFaro, Victor Feldman, Art Pepper, Charlie Barnet, Oscar Peterson, Don Byas, Conte Candoli, Joe Thomas, Billy Taylor, Bob Cooper, Al Haig, Milt Jackson, Lucky Thompson, Chuck Wayne, Richie Kamuca, Norman Granz, Bill Holman, Howard Rumsey, Chet Baker, Frank Rosolino, Joe Mondragon, Herb Ellis, Thelonious Monk, Chris Connor, Allen Eager, Jack Sheldon, Hank Jones, Shorty Rogers, Benny Goodman, Stan Kenton, Woody Herman, Quincy Jones, Georgie Auld, Charlie Ventura, Boyd Raeburn, Nelson Riddle, Billy May, Skitch Henderson and The Tonight Show Band, Ella Fitzgerald, Peggy Lee, Frank Sinatra, Gary Crosby, Pat Boone, Barbra Streisand, The Supremes, Vic Damone, Nancy Wilson, Nat King Cole, Sarah Vaughan, Billie Holiday, Bobby Darin, June Christy, Mel Torme, Lalo Schifrin, Henry Mancini, Nelson Riddle, André Previn, Neil Hefti, Barney Kessel

Adolph Stanley Levey known professionally as Stan Levey (April 5, 1926 – April 19, 2005) was an American jazz drummer. He was known for working with Charlie Parker and Dizzy Gillespie in the early development of bebop during the 1940s, and in the next decade had a stint with bandleader Stan Kenton. Levey retired from music in the 1970s to work as a photographer.

== Biography ==
He was born in Philadelphia, Pennsylvania, United States, Levey is considered one of the earliest bebop drummers, and one of the very few white drummers involved in the formative years of bebop. He played in Philadelphia with Dizzy Gillespie's group in 1942, at the age of 16. Soon after, he went to New York City, where he and Gillespie worked on 52nd Street with Charlie Parker and Oscar Pettiford.

After his tenure with the Stan Kenton Orchestra he moved to the West Coast in 1954, joining Howard Rumsey, Don Joham and the Lighthouse All-Stars, and was a major influence in West Coast jazz. Though "cool" jazz was common on the West Coast, Levey's crisp, melodic style continued to have more in common with bop than cool, and he inspired every group he ever played in. A right-handed person, Levey played the drums as if left-handed, orienting his drum kit as 'mirror-image' to the standard setup. Levey played on thousands of recordings, including those with musicians Dizzy Gillespie, Charlie Parker, Miles Davis, Stan Getz, Ella Fitzgerald, Peggy Lee, Frank Sinatra, Nat King Cole, and with bands such as that of Quincy Jones, and Skitch Henderson and The Tonight Show Band.

Levey retired from the music business in 1973 to become a professional photographer. He died at age 79, two months after surgery for cancer of the jaw, in Van Nuys, California. He was buried at the Forest Lawn, Hollywood Hills Cemetery in Los Angeles.

== Discography ==
With Chet Baker and Art Pepper

- The Route (Pacific Jazz, 1956)

With The Beach Boys

- Sunflower (Reprise, 1970)

With Buddy Bregman

- Swinging Kicks (Verve, 1957)

With Conte Candoli

- Conte Candoli Quartet (Mode, 1957)
- Little Band Big Jazz (Crown, 1960)

With Billy Eckstine

- The Modern Sound of Mr. B (Mercury, 1964)

With Victor Feldman

- Vic Feldman on Vibes (Mode, 1957)
- The Arrival of Victor Feldman (Contemporary, 1958)
- Latinsville! (Contemporary, 1960)

With Stan Getz

- Stan Getz Quartets (Prestige, 1955)
- The Steamer (Verve, 1956)
- Gerry Mulligan Meets Stan Getz (Verve, 1957) with Gerry Mulligan

With Dizzy Gillespie

- For Musicians Only (Verve, 1956)

With Jimmy Giuffre

- The Jimmy Giuffre Clarinet (Atlantic, 1956)
- Herb Ellis Meets Jimmy Giuffre (Verve, 1959) with Herb Ellis

With Johnny Hartman

- Unforgettable Songs by Johnny Hartman (ABC, 1966)

With Stan Kenton

- Popular Favorites by Stan Kenton (Capitol, 1953)
- New Concepts of Artistry in Rhythm (Capitol, 1953)
- Sketches on Standards (Capitol, 1953)
- This Modern World (Capitol, 1953)
- Portraits on Standards (Capitol, 1953)
- Kenton Showcase (Capitol, 1954)

With Lee Konitz

- Lee Konitz Plays (Disques Vogue, 1953)

With Peggy Lee

- Christmas Carousel (Capitol, 1960)
- Pretty Eyes (Capitol, 1960)
- Blues Cross Country (Capitol, 1962)
- Mink Jazz (Capitol, 1963)
- I'm a Woman (Capitol, 1963)
- In Love Again! (Capitol, 1964)
- In the Name of Love (Capitol, 1964)
- Big $pender (Capitol, 1966)

With Oscar Peterson

- Soft Sands (Polygram, 1957)

With Warne Marsh

- Music for Prancing (Mode, 1957)

With The Monkees

- The Birds, the Bees & the Monkees (Colgems, 1968)

With Herb Ellis

- Nothing But the Blues (Verve, 1958)

With Red Mitchell

- West Coast Rhythm (Affinity, recorded 1954–1955, released 1982)

With Mark Murphy

- Mark Murphy's Hip Parade (Capitol, 1959)

With Shorty Rogers

- Shorty Rogers Plays Richard Rodgers (RCA Victor, 1957)
- Portrait of Shorty (RCA Victor, 1957)

With Sonny Stitt

- Previously Unreleased Recordings (Verve, 1973)
