= The Sounds of '66 =

Live album by Sammy Davis Jr. / Buddy Rich
- Released: 1966
- Recorded: 1966
- Genre: Vocal jazz
- Length: 29:42
- Label: Reprise
- Producer: Jimmy Bowen

Sammy Davis Jr. chronology
The Sammy Davis Jr. Show (1966)	The Sounds of '66 (1966)	Sammy Davis Jr. Sings and Laurindo Almeida Plays (1966)

Buddy Rich chronology
Swingin' New Big Band (1966)	The Sounds of '66 (1966)	Big Swing Face (1967)

Professional ratings
Review scores
Source	Rating
Allmusic link	4/5 stars

The Sounds of '66 is a 1966 live album by Sammy Davis Jr., accompanied by Buddy Rich and a big band.

The album was recorded at the Sands Hotel on the Las Vegas Strip in the early hours of two successive nights, 18 and 19 June 1966, after both artists had already performed shows earlier.

== Track listing ==
=== Original LP ===
Side A

1. "Come Back to Me" (Burton Lane, Alan Jay Lerner) – 2:56
2. "I Know a Place" (Tony Hatch) – 2:27
3. "What Did I Have That I Don't Have?" (Lane, Lerner) – 3:43
4. "What the World Needs Now Is Love" (Burt Bacharach, Hal David) – 3:05
5. "Once in Love With Amy" (Frank Loesser) – 2:45

Side B

1. "Ding-Dong! The Witch Is Dead" (Harold Arlen, Yip Harburg) – 1:49
2. "What Now My Love?" (Gilbert Bécaud, Pierre Delanoë, Carl Sigman) – 3:08
3. "What Kind of Fool Am I?" (Leslie Bricusse, Anthony Newley) – 3:07
4. "If It's the Last Thing I Do" (Sammy Cahn, Saul Chaplin) – 3:24
5. "Please Don't Talk About Me When I'm Gone" (Sidney Clare, Sam H. Stept) – 3:18

=== CD re-issue ===
1. Introduction by Sammy Davis Jr.
2. "Come Back to Me" (Burton Lane, Alan Jay Lerner) – 4:12
3. "The Birth of the Blues" (Lew Brown, Buddy DeSylva, Ray Henderson) – CD bonus track
4. "I Know a Place" (Tony Hatch) – 2:27
5. "What Did I Have That I Don't Have?" (Lane, Lerner) – 3:43
6. "What the World Needs Now Is Love" (Burt Bacharach, Hal David) – 3:04
7. "Once in Love With Amy" (Frank Loesser) – 2:45
8. "Ding-Dong! The Witch Is Dead" (Harold Arlen, Yip Harburg) – 1:48
9. "What Now My Love?" (Gilbert Bécaud, Pierre Delanoë, Carl Sigman) – 3:07
10. "What Kind of Fool Am I?" (Leslie Bricusse, Anthony Newley) – 3:07
11. "If It's the Last Thing I Do" (Sammy Cahn, Saul Chaplin) – 3:24
12. Closing remarks by Sammy Davis, Jr.
13. "Please Don't Talk About Me When I'm Gone" (Sidney Clare, Sam H. Stept) – 3:26

== Personnel ==
- Sammy Davis Jr. – vocal
- Buddy Rich – drums
- The Buddy Rich Big Band
  - Gary Walters – bass
  - John Bunch – piano
  - Barry Zweig – guitar
  - Bob Faust, Chuck Foster, Tony Scodwell, John Sottile – trumpet
  - John Boice, Bob Braun, Jim Trimble – trombone
  - Jay Corre, Marty Flax, Tom Hall, Sam Most, Steve Perlow – saxophone
- Ernie Freeman, George Rhodes – arranger
