= Windflower (album) =

Studio album by Herb Ellis, Remo Palmier
- Released: October 1977
- Studio: Bell Sound Studios, New York, NY
- Genre: Jazz
- Length: 39:37
- Label: Concord

Herb Ellis chronology
Great Guitars: Straight Tracks with Charlie Byrd, Barney Kessel (1978)	Windflower (1977)	Soft & Mellow (1979)

Windflower is an album by jazz guitarists Herb Ellis and Remo Palmier, released in 1977.

== Receptions ==
Professional ratings
Review scores
Source	Rating
AllMusic	4/5 stars

Writing for AllMusic, Scott Yanow noted that while Ellis took the lead on the album, Palmier was given just as much opportunity in the spotlight, with the "two old friends challeng[ing] each other on a variety of appealing chord changes..." Leonard Feather gave the album a positive review in the Los Angeles Times, calling it "first-rate MOR jazz". In a review for his blog JazzWax, Marc Myers said that "through their easy, swinging approach, they sound fresh and alive. The guitar lines are lovely, and the chords are splendidly voiced". Asbury Park Press' Don Lass thought the album lacked urgency and was ultimately "good, but nothing beyond that". The Buffalo News' Jeff Simon wrote that Ellis mostly stays out of Palmier's way, allowing the latter's "thoroughly graceful and profoundly musical technique" to shine.

== Track listing ==
1. Windflower (Sara Cassey) - 3:55
2. The Night Has a Thousand Eyes (Jerry Brainin/Buddy Bernier) - 6:13
3. My Foolish Heart (Victory Young/Ned Washington) - 3:20
4. Close Your Eyes (Bernice Petkere) - 4:04
5. Danny Boy (Frederick Edward Weatherly) - 2:49
6. Walkin' (Richard Carpenter) - 5:23
7. Stardust (Hoagy Carmichael/Mitchell Parish) - 5:30
8. Triste (Antônio Carlos Jobim) - 4:03
9. Groove Merchant (Jerome Richardson) - 4:49

== Personnel ==
- Herb Ellis - guitar
- Remo Palmier - guitar
- George Duvivier - bass
- Ron Traxler - drums
