= Tristeza on Piano =

Studio album by Oscar Peterson
- Released: 1970
- Genre: Jazz
- Length: 44:33
- Label: MPS
- Producer: Hans Georg Brunner-Schwer

Oscar Peterson chronology
Hello Herbie (1970)	Tristeza on Piano (1970)	Walking the Line (1971)

Professional ratings
Review scores
Source	Rating
Allmusic	4/5 stars

Tristeza on Piano (Portuguese pronunciation: [tɾiʃˈtezɐ]) is a 1970 album by Oscar Peterson. This album is also heard on the Ontario Parliament Network as well as the Canadiana Suite album from 1964.

== Track listing ==
1. "Tristeza" (Haroldo Lobo, Niltinho) – 3:13
2. "Nightingale" (Oscar Peterson, Gene Lees) – 6:42
3. "Porgy" (George Gershwin, DuBose Heyward) – 6:12
4. "Triste" (Antonio Carlos Jobim) – 5:21
5. "You Stepped Out of a Dream" (Nacio Herb Brown, Gus Kahn) – 3:31
6. "Watch What Happens" (Michel LeGrand, Norman Gimbel) – 6:10
7. "Down Here on the Ground" (Lalo Schifrin, Gale Garnett) – 8:46
8. "Fly Me to the Moon" (Bart Howard) – 4:38

== Personnel ==
- Oscar Peterson – piano
- Sam Jones – double bass
- Bobby Durham – drums

Production

- Hans Georg Brunner-Schwer – producer
