= I'm a Woman (Peggy Lee album) =

Studio album by Peggy Lee
- Released: July 1963
- Recorded: March 28, 1962, January 2–5, 1963
- Genre: Jazz
- Length: 28:51
- Label: Capitol
- Producer: Dave Cavanaugh

Peggy Lee chronology
Mink Jazz (1962)	I'm a Woman (1963)	In Love Again! (1964)

Professional ratings
Review scores
Source	Rating
Allmusic	3.5/5 stars
New Record Mirror	4/5 stars

I'm a Woman is an album by Peggy Lee that was released in 1963. It was made when the title song was in the charts.

== Chart performance ==
The album debuted on Billboard magazine's Top LP's chart in the issue dated March 9, 1963, peaking at No. 18 during a twenty-six-week run on the chart. The album debuted on Cashbox magazine's Top 100 Albums chart in the issue dated February 23, 1963, peaking at No. 21 during a twenty-week run on the chart. On the magazine's Top 50 Stereo chart it reached No. 20 during a shorter twelve-week run on it.

The namesake single debuted on the Billboard Hot 100 in the issue dated January 5, 1963, reaching No. 54 during a nine-week stay on it, although Cashbox ranked it lower at No. 71. It reached No. 79 on the Australian charts as well. The follow-up single "The Alley Cat Song" didn't chart.

== Track listing ==
=== Side one ===
1. "The Alley Cat Song" (Frank Bjorn, Jack Harlen) – 1:37
2. "Mama's Gone, Goodbye" (Peter Bocage, A.J. Piron) – 2:17
3. "I'm Walkin'" (Antoine Domino, Dave Bartholomew) – 2:33
4. "Come Rain or Come Shine" (Harold Arlen, Johnny Mercer) – 2:31
5. "There Ain't No Sweet Man That's Worth the Salt of My Tears" (Fred Fisher) – 3:08
6. "I'm a Woman" (Jerry Leiber and Mike Stoller) – 2:00

=== Side two ===
1. "Mack the Knife" (Kurt Weill, Bertolt Brecht, Marc Blitzstein) – 2:03
2. "You're Nobody till Somebody Loves You" (Russ Morgan, Larry Stock, James Cavanaugh) – 2:40
3. "I'll Get By" (Fred Ahlert, Roy Turk) – 2:19
4. "I Left My Heart in San Francisco" (Douglass Cross, George Cory) – 2:39
5. "A Taste of Honey" (Ric Marlow, Bobby Scott) – 2:18
6. "One Note Samba" (Antônio Carlos Jobim, Newton Mendonca, Jon Hendricks) – 2:46

== Personnel ==
- Peggy Lee, vocals
- Dick Hazard, conductor, except as below
- Benny Carter, conductor on I'm a Woman and I'll Get By
- Mannie Klein, trumpet
- Al Hendrickson and John Pisano, guitar
- Mike Melvoin, piano
- Max Bennett, bass
- Stan Levey, drums

== Charts ==
Chart (1963)	Peak position
US Billboard Top LPs	18
US Cashbox Top 100 Albums	21
US Cashbox Top 50 Stereo	20

=== Singles ===
Year	Single	Chart	Peak position
1963	"I'm a Woman"	US Billboard Hot 100	54
1963	"I'm a Woman"	US Cashbox Top 100 Singles	71
1963	"I'm a Woman"	AUS Kent Music Report	79
