= Herb Ellis Meets Jimmy Giuffre =

Studio album by Herb Ellis and Jimmy Giuffre
- Released: 1959
- Recorded: March 26, 1959; Radio Recorders, Hollywood, CA
- Genre: Jazz
- Label: Verve; MGV 8311
- Producer: Jimmy Giuffre

Jimmy Giuffre chronology
7 Pieces (1959)	Herb Ellis Meets Jimmy Giuffre (1959)	Lee Konitz Meets Jimmy Giuffre (1959)

Herb Ellis chronology
Nothing but the Blues (1957)	Herb Ellis Meets Jimmy Giuffre (1959)	Thank You Charlie Christian (1960)

Herb Ellis Meets Jimmy Giuffre is an album by American jazz guitarist Herb Ellis and saxophonist, composer and arranger Jimmy Giuffre which was released on the Verve label in 1959.

== Track listing ==
1. "Goose Grease" (Herb Ellis, Jimmy Giuffre) - 3:05
2. "When Your Lover Has Gone" (Einar Aaron Swan) - 5:57
3. "Remember" (Giuffre) - 7:43
4. "Patricia" (Art Pepper) - 4:06
5. "A Country Boy" (Ellis) - 5:06
6. "You Know" (Giuffre) - 4:32
7. "My Old Flame" (Sam Coslow, Arthur Johnston) - 3:32
8. "People Will Say We're in Love" (Richard Rodgers, Oscar Hammerstein II) - 4:49

== Personnel ==
- Herb Ellis - guitar
- Jimmy Giuffre - tenor saxophone, arranger
- Art Pepper, Bud Shank - alto saxophone
- Richie Kamuca - tenor saxophone
- Jim Hall - rhythm guitar
- Lou Levy - piano
- Joe Mondragon - bass
- Stan Levey - drums
