= Jump for Joy (Bobby Short album) =

Studio album by Bobby Short
- Released: 1970
- Recorded: 1969
- Genre: Jazz, traditional pop
- Length: 34:04
- Label: Atlantic SD 1535

Bobby Short chronology
My Personal Property (1963)	Jump for Joy (1970)	Nobody Else But Me (1971)

Jump for Joy is a 1970 album by American singer and pianist Bobby Short.

== Reception ==
Professional ratings
Review scores
Source	Rating
AllMusic	3.5/5 stars

William Ruhlmann reviewed the album for Allmusic and wrote that "For once, the purveyors of the Great American Songbook were absent: no Porter or Gershwin or Rodgers. Instead, Short performed a combination of recent songs from Broadway and old, bluesy numbers. The latter seemed to draw the greatest enthusiasm from him as he revisited some tunes he might have played in Midwest roadhouses back in his youth, songs like "Romance in the Dark," "I'm Confessin' That I Love You," and the newly trendy "If You're a Viper," an ode to marijuana use. ...But even second-drawer Short on record was welcome after so many years away".

== Track listing ==
1. "Jump for Joy" (Duke Ellington, Paul Francis Webster, Sid Kuller) – 2:35
2. "Romance In the Dark" (Willie Broonzy, Lil Green) – 3:17
3. "Whoever You Are I Love You" (Burt Bacharach, Hal David) – 4:04
4. "I'm Confessin' That I Love You" (Al J. Neiburg, Doc Dougherty, Ellis Reynolds) – 4:01
5. "If You're a Viper" (Stuff Smith) – 2:36
6. "I Cannot Make Her Jealous" (Ervin Drake) – 2:41
7. "I'm Glad to See You've Got What You Want" (Harvey Schmidt, Tom Jones) – 2:59
8. Medley: "I've Never Been In Love Before"/"Falling in Love Again (Can't Help It)" (Frank Loesser)/(Friedrich Hollaender) – 3:46
9. "Just for Today" (Ervin Drake) – 3:31
10. "Simon Smith and the Amazing Dancing Bear" (Randy Newman) – 2:11
11. "The Gypsies, the Jugglers & the Clowns" (Mel Mandel, Norman Sachs) – 2:44

== Personnel ==
- Bobby Short – vocals, piano
- Beverly Peer – double bass
- Dick Sheridan – drums
- Marvin Israel – design
- Phil Lehle – engineer
- Douglas Watt – liner notes
- O. Vernon Matisse – cover photography
- Nesuhi Ertegun – producer
