= The Steamer =

Studio album by Stan Getz Quartet
- Released: 1957
- Recorded: November 24, 1956
- Studio: Radio Recorders, Hollywood, California
- Genre: Jazz
- Length: 53:40 CD reissue with bonus tracks
- Label: Verve; MGV 8294
- Producer: Norman Granz

Stan Getz chronology
For Musicians Only (1956)	The Steamer (1957)	The Soft Swing (1957)

The Steamer is an album by saxophonist Stan Getz, recorded in 1956 and first released on the Verve label.

== Reception ==
The AllMusic review awarded the album 4 stars, stating, "It doesn't happen too often, but there are times when the title of a jazz album and the material within interface perfectly. Hence The Steamer, where Stan Getz joined forces with a super West Coast-based rhythm section to produce some truly steaming music".

Professional ratings
Review scores
Source	Rating
AllMusic	4/5 stars
The Penguin Guide to Jazz Recordings	4/4 stars

== Track listing ==
1. "Blues for Mary Jane" (Stan Getz) - 7:53
2. "There Will Never Be Another You" (Harry Warren, Mack Gordon) - 9:20
3. "You're Blasé" (Ord Hamilton, Bruce Sievier) - 4:13
4. "Too Close for Comfort" (Jerry Bock, Larry Holofcener, George David Weiss) - 6:19
5. "Like Someone in Love" (Jimmy Van Heusen, Johnny Burke) - 6:30
6. "How About You?" (Burton Lane, Ralph Freed) - 7:24
7. "How About You?" [Alternate Take] (Lane, Freed) - 6:59 Bonus track on CD reissue
8. "There Will Never Be Another You" [Incomplete and Breakdown Takes] (Warren, Gordon) - 1:09 Bonus track on CD reissue
9. "You're Blasé" " [False Start] (Hamilton, Sievier) - 0:46 Bonus track on CD reissue
10. "Like Someone in Love" [Incomplete Take] (Van Huesen, Burke) - 0:37 Bonus track on CD reissue
11. "How About You?" [False Starts and Breakdown Take] (Lane, Freed) - 2:30 Bonus track on CD reissue

== Personnel ==
- Stan Getz - tenor saxophone
- Lou Levy - piano
- Leroy Vinnegar - bass
- Stan Levey - drums
