= Nothing but the Blues (Herb Ellis album) =

Nothing But the Blues

Studio album by Herb Ellis
- Released: 1958
- Recorded: October 11, 1957
- Studio: Hollywood, California
- Genre: Jazz
- Length: 57:47
- Label: Verve

Herb Ellis chronology
Ellis in Wonderland (1956)	Nothing But the Blues (1958)	Herb Ellis Meets Jimmy Giuffre (1959)

Professional ratings
Review scores
Source	Rating
AllMusic	5/5 stars
DownBeat	5/5 stars

Nothing but the Blues is the second album by jazz guitarist Herb Ellis. In the liner notes, Nat Hentoff calls it Ellis's "best album yet and one of the most directly fulfilling sessions" of 1958. In his glowing review for DownBeat, John Tynan says, "Gather 'round, children, and listen to the message of the blues. The whole story is right here in eight, eloquent preachments by as fine a quintet of wailers as can be assembled." He ends his review by calling it "One of the very best jazz albums of this year.”

"The point at which blues becomes jazz is an elusive one," says Gregory Isola. "Those of you up for exploring this crucial crossroads ... can start right here."

== Track listing ==
No.	Title	Length
1.	"Papa's Blues" (Ray Brown)	7:06
2.	"Big Red's Boogie Woogie" (Ellis)	5:39
3.	"Tin Roof Blues" (Pollack, Brunies, Roppolo, Stitzel, Mares, Walter Melrose)	3:00
4.	"Soft Winds" (Benny Goodman)	4:45
5.	"Royal Garden Blues" (Clarence Williams, Spencer Williams)	4:46
6.	"Patti Cake" (Ellis)	6:02
7.	"Blues for Janet" (Ellis, Brown)	7:13
8.	"Blues for Junior" (Ray Brown)	4:51

=== 1994 CD reissue bonus tracks ===
The following tracks were recorded May 1, 1958, in Paris

No.	Title	Length
9.	"Les Tricheurs" (Roy Eldridge, Stan Getz)	3:12
10.	"Clo's Blues" (Coleman Hawkins)	3:20
11.	"Phil's Tune" (Roy Eldridge)	4:20
12.	"Mic's Jump" (Dizzy Gillespie)	2:16

== Personnel ==
- Herb Ellis – guitar
- Roy Eldridge – trumpet, tracks 1–9, 11
- Dizzy Gillespie – trumpet, track 12
- Stan Getz – tenor saxophone, tracks 1–9
- Coleman Hawkins – tenor saxophone, track 10
- Ray Brown – double bass
- Stan Levey – drums, tracks 1–8
- Gus Johnson – drums, tracks 9–12
- Oscar Peterson – piano, tracks 9–12
