= Jazz Giants '58 =

Studio album by Stan Getz, Gerry Mulligan, Harry "Sweets" Edison and Oscar Peterson
- Released: 1958
- Recorded: August 1, 1957
- Studio: Capitol (Hollywood)
- Genre: Jazz
- Length: 54:22
- Label: Verve
- Producer: Norman Granz

Stan Getz chronology
| For Musicians Only (1958) | Jazz Giants '58 (1958) | Stan Getz and the Oscar Peterson Trio (1958) |

Oscar Peterson chronology
| Stan Getz and the Oscar Peterson Trio (1958) | Jazz Giants '58 (1958) | My Fair Lady (1958) |

Professional ratings
Review scores
| Source | Rating |
|---|---|
| AllMusic | 5/5 stars |

Jazz Giants '58 is a 1958 album produced by Norman Granz featuring Stan Getz, Gerry Mulligan and Harry "Sweets" Edison, accompanied by Louis Bellson and the Oscar Peterson trio.

== Background ==
The album was similar in format to a previous all-star jazz studio session produced by Granz, The Jazz Giants '56. The earlier album featured a cast of seven 1930s swing musicians, including four from the Count Basie orchestras of the late 1930s and early 1940s. Jazz Giants '58 features a slightly younger cast of seven players, including two West Coast jazz saxophone stars, another alumna of the 1930s Basie band, the Oscar Peterson Trio, and a big band drummer. All of the Jazz Giants '58 musicians were recording mainstream swing music in the 1940s, but almost all had also gone on to play the modern jazz that developed after the World War II.

The session was reissued in 1966 as Gerry's Time replacing "Chocolate Sundae" by a track from 1959. Jazz Giants '58 was remastered and released on CD in 2008 as part of Verve Originals series.

== Track listing ==
1. "Chocolate Sundae" (Harry "Sweets" Edison, Stan Getz, Gerry Mulligan, Oscar Peterson) – 10:10
2. "When Your Lover Has Gone" (Einar Aaron Swan) – 7:16
3. "Candy" (Mack David, Joan Whitney Kramer, Alex Kramer) – 7:59
4. "Ballade: "Lush Life"/"Lullaby of the Leaves"/"Makin' Whoopee"/"It Never Entered My Mind" (Billy Strayhorn)/(Bernice Petkere, Joe Young)/(Walter Donaldson, Gus Kahn)/(Richard Rodgers, Lorenz Hart) – 11:54
5. "Woody 'n' You" (Dizzy Gillespie) – 9:35

== Personnel ==
- Harry "Sweets" Edison – trumpet
- Stan Getz – tenor saxophone
- Gerry Mulligan – baritone saxophone
- Herb Ellis – guitar
- Oscar Peterson – piano
- Ray Brown – double bass
- Louis Bellson – drums
