= Oscar Peterson Plays Count Basie =

Studio album by Oscar Peterson
- Released: 1956
- Recorded: December 27, 1955
- Genre: Jazz
- Length: 44:45
- Label: Clef
- Producer: Norman Granz

Oscar Peterson chronology
Buddy DeFranco and Oscar Peterson Play George Gershwin (1954)	Oscar Peterson Plays Count Basie (1956)	In a Romantic Mood (1955)

Professional ratings
Review scores
Source	Rating
Allmusic	4.5/5 stars

Oscar Peterson Plays Count Basie is a 1956 album by Oscar Peterson, of music associated with Count Basie.

== Track listing ==
1. "Lester Leaps In" (Lester Young) – 3:58
2. "Easy Does It" (Sy Oliver, Young) – 6:28
3. "9:20 Special" (William Engvick, Earle Warren) – 3:40
4. "Jumpin' at the Woodside" (Count Basie) – 5:42
5. "Blues for Basie" (Oscar Peterson) – 3:34
6. "Broadway" (Billy Bird, Teddy McRae, Henri Woode) – 4:31
7. "Blue and Sentimental" (Basie, Mack David, Jerry Livingston) – 2:29
8. "Topsy" (Edgar Battle, Eddie Durham) – 4:22
9. "One O'Clock Jump" (Basie) – 5:49
10. "Jive at Five" (Basie, Harry "Sweets" Edison) – 4:11

== Personnel ==
=== Performance ===
- Oscar Peterson – piano
- Ray Brown – double bass
- Herb Ellis - guitar
- Buddy Rich - drums
