= The Oscar Peterson Trio at the Concertgebouw =

Live album by Oscar Peterson
- Released: 1958
- Recorded: September 29 and October 9, 1957
- Venues: Civic Opera House, Chicago
- Genre: Jazz
- Length: 69:50
- Label: Verve
- Producer: Norman Granz

Oscar Peterson chronology
Louis Armstrong Meets Oscar Peterson (1958)	The Oscar Peterson Trio at the Concertgebouw (1958)	On the Town with the Oscar Peterson Trio (1958)

Professional ratings
Review scores
Source	Rating
AllMusic	5/5 stars
The Penguin Guide to Jazz Recordings	3.5/4 stars

The Oscar Peterson Trio at the Concertgebouw is a 1958 live album by the Oscar Peterson Trio. Although said to be recorded in Europe, the music comes from a Chicago concert at the Civic Opera House. Five additional selections are from an appearance in Los Angeles.

== Track listing ==
1. "The Lady Is a Tramp" (Lorenz Hart, Richard Rodgers) – 4:51
2. "We'll Be Together Again" (Carl T. Fischer, Frankie Laine) – 2:34
3. "Bluesology" (Milt Jackson) – 9:23
4. "Budo" (aka "Hallucinations") (Miles Davis, Bud Powell) – 4:42
5. "I've Got the World on a String" (Harold Arlen, Ted Koehler) – 6:41
6. "Daahoud" (Clifford Brown) – 7:00
7. "When Lights Are Low" (Benny Carter, Spencer Williams) – 4:03
8. "Evrev" (Oscar Peterson) – 4:51
9. "Should I?" (Nacio Herb Brown, Arthur Freed) – 5:16
10. "Big Fat Mama" (Lucky Millinder, Stafford Simon) – 7:34
11. "(Back Home In) Indiana" (James F. Hanley, Ballard MacDonald) – 4:07
12. "Joy Spring" (Brown) – 5:33
13. "Elevation" (Elliot Lawrence, Gerry Mulligan) – 3:28

== Personnel ==
- Oscar Peterson– piano
- Ray Brown – double bass
- Herb Ellis – jazz guitar
