= Soft Sands (album) =

Studio album by Oscar Peterson
- Released: 1957
- Recorded: March 28, July 31, 1957
- Genre: Jazz
- Label: Verve
- Producer: Norman Granz

Oscar Peterson chronology
Oscar Peterson at the Stratford Shakespearean Festival (1956)	Soft Sands (1957)	The Oscar Peterson Trio with Sonny Stitt, Roy Eldridge and Jo Jones at Newport (1956)

Professional ratings
Review scores
Source	Rating
Allmusic	3/5 stars

Soft Sands is a 1957 studio album by Oscar Peterson, arranged by Buddy Bregman.

== Track listing ==
1. "Soft Sands" (Carroll Coates) – 2:17
2. "On the Outside Looking In" – 2:31
3. "It Happens Every Spring" – 2:41
4. "Chanel" (Piero Umiliani) – 2:38
5. "You Took Advantage of Me" (Lorenz Hart, Richard Rodgers) – 1:58
6. "Why, Oh Why" – 3:02
7. "Song to the Stars" – 2:40
8. "Echoes" – 2:37
9. "I've Never Left your Arms" – 2:49
10. "I Can't Get Started" (Vernon Duke, Ira Gershwin) – 2:56
11. "Dream on a Summer Night" – 2:53
12. "Susquehanna" – 2:42

== Personnel ==
=== Performance ===
- Oscar Peterson – piano, vocal
- Ray Brown – double bass
- Herb Ellis - guitar
- Stan Levey - drums
- Buddy Bregman – arranger, conductor
