= Oscar Peterson at the Stratford Shakespearean Festival =

Live album by Oscar Peterson
- Released: 1957
- Recorded: August 8, 1956
- Genre: Jazz
- Length: 75:03
- Label: Verve
- Producer: Norman Granz

Oscar Peterson chronology
Oscar Peterson Plays Count Basie (1955)	Oscar Peterson at the Stratford Shakespearean Festival (1957)	Soft Sands (1956)

Professional ratings
Review scores
Source	Rating
AllMusic	5/5 stars
Disc	3/5 stars
The Penguin Guide to Jazz Recordings	3.5/4 stars

Oscar Peterson at the Stratford Shakespearean Festival is a live album by Oscar Peterson, accompanied by Ray Brown and Herb Ellis, recorded at the 1956 Stratford Shakespeare Festival in the city of Stratford, Ontario, Canada.

== Track listing ==
1. "Falling in Love with Love" (Lorenz Hart, Richard Rodgers) – 6:15
2. "How About You?" (Ralph Freed, Burton Lane) – 5:53
3. "Flamingo" (Edmund Anderson, Ted Grouya) – 4:59
4. "Swinging on a Star" (Johnny Burke, Jimmy Van Heusen) – 5:33
5. "Noreen's Nocturne" (Oscar Peterson) – 5:31
6. "Gypsy in My Soul" (Clay Boland, Moe Jaffe) – 6:23
7. "Nuages" (Django Reinhardt) – 5:05
8. "How High the Moon" (Nancy Hamilton, Morgan Lewis) – 9:44
9. "Love You Madly" (Duke Ellington) – 8:01
10. "52nd Street Theme" (Thelonious Monk) – 4:13
11. "Daisy's Dream" (Peterson) – 13:26

== Personnel ==
=== Performance ===
- Oscar Peterson - piano
- Ray Brown - double bass
- Herb Ellis - guitar
