= World Statesman =

Studio album by Dizzy Gillespie
- Released: 1956
- Recorded: May 18–19 and June 6, 1956; New York City
- Genre: Jazz
- Length: 40:09
- Label: Norgran; MGN 1084
- Producer: Norman Granz

Dizzy Gillespie chronology
Modern Jazz Sextet (1956)	World Statesman (1956)	Dizzy in Greece (1957)

World Statesman is an album by trumpeter Dizzy Gillespie, recorded in 1956 and released on the Norgran label. The album was reissued as part of the 2CD compilation Birks Works: The Verve Big Band Sessions.

== Reception ==
The AllMusic review states: "This set introduced the new Dizzy Gillespie big band which was making headlines for the acclaim it received (and for the excitement it caused) during its State Department-sponsored world tours... this brilliant (and historic) orchestra really shows a great deal of spirit, power and creativity."

Professional ratings
Review scores
Source	Rating
AllMusic	4.5/5 stars
The Encyclopedia of Popular Music	3/5 stars

== Track listing ==
All compositions by Dizzy Gillespie except as indicated

Side One:

1. "Dizzy's Business" (Ernie Wilkins) – 3:37
2. "Jessica's Day" (Quincy Jones) – 4:50
3. "Tour de Force" – 5:04
4. "I Can't Get Started" (Vernon Duke, Ira Gershwin) – 2:55
5. "Doodlin'" (Horace Silver) – 3:56

Side Two:

1. "A Night in Tunisia" – 5:34
2. "Stella by Starlight" (Ned Washington, Victor Young) – 4:07
3. "The Champ" – 4:42
4. "My Reverie" (Larry Clinton, Claude Debussy) – 2:52
5. "Dizzy's Blues" (A. K. Salim) – 2:32

== Personnel ==
- Dizzy Gillespie – trumpet, vocals
- Joe Gordon, Quincy Jones, Ermit V. Perry, Carl Warwick – trumpet
- Rod Levitt, Melba Liston, Frank Rehak – trombone
- Jimmy Powell, Phil Woods – alto saxophone
- Billy Mitchell, Ernie Wilkins – tenor saxophone
- Marty Flax – baritone saxophone
- Walter Davis Jr. – piano
- Nelson Boyd – bass
- Charlie Persip – drums
