= On the Town with the Oscar Peterson Trio =

Live album by Oscar Peterson
- Released: 1958
- Recorded: July 1–5, 1958
- Genre: Jazz
- Length: 105:56
- Label: Verve
- Producer: Norman Granz

Oscar Peterson chronology
Oscar Peterson at the Concertgebouw (1958)	On the Town with the Oscar Peterson Trio (1958)	Oscar Peterson Plays "My Fair Lady" (1958)

On the Town with the Oscar Peterson Trio is a live album by jazz pianist Oscar Peterson, released in 1958.

== Recording ==
The concert took place at the Town Tavern in Toronto.

== Reception ==
Professional ratings
Review scores
Source	Rating
AllMusic	5/5 stars
The Penguin Guide to Jazz Recordings	3.5/4 stars

In a review for AllMusic, critic Thom Jurek wrote: "No matter how busy he got—and this album illustrates the rule since it's in a live setting—Peterson always, always swung, particularly with Herb Ellis on guitar and Ray Brown on bass... Everything this trio played was rooted in a blues so pervasive, so swinging, so hot, it could not be anything but truly fine jazz... In 1958 this was a night to remember; in the 21st Century it's a disc to memorize in the depths of the heart."

All About Jazz wrote of the album "all Peterson records sound pretty similar, but it's difficult to argue with someone so gifted at making piano playing seem so effortless and inviting. Critics argue that this is because Peterson plays it safe, sticking to familiar songs and creating solos from a warehouse of stock riffs, but that misses the point; Peterson wasn't an innovator like Powell or Monk, but more of a stylist who was a master of various techniques in the jazz idiom."

== Track listing ==
1. "Sweet Georgia Brown" (Ben Bernie, Kenneth Casey, Maceo Pinkard) – 7:47
2. "Should I?" (Nacio Herb Brown, Arthur Freed) – 5:04
3. "When Lights Are Low" (Benny Carter, Spencer Williams) – 5:57
4. "Easy Listening Blues" (Nadine Robinson) – 6:48
5. "Pennies from Heaven" (Johnny Burke, Arthur Johnston) – 7:22
6. "The Champ" (Dizzy Gillespie) – 5:25
7. "Moonlight in Vermont" (John Blackburn, Karl Suessdorf) – 6:05

=== Bonus tracks ===
8. "Baby, Baby All the Time" (Bobby Troup) – 6:49
9. "I Like to Recognize the Tune" (Lorenz Hart, Richard Rodgers) – 4:17
10. "Joy Spring" (Clifford Brown) – 9:01
11. "Gal in Calico" (Leo Robin, Arthur Schwartz) – 5:16
12. "Our Love Is Here to Stay" (George Gershwin, Ira Gershwin) – 7:42

== Personnel ==
Performance

- Oscar Peterson – piano
- Herb Ellis – guitar
- Ray Brown – double bass

Production

- Phil Stern – photography
- Norman Granz – producer
