= Dizzy in Greece =

Studio album by Dizzy Gillespie
- Released: 1957
- Recorded: May 18 or 19, June 6, 1956 and April 7 & 8, 1957
- Studio: NYC
- Genre: Jazz
- Label: Verve; MGV 8017
- Producer: Norman Granz

Dizzy Gillespie chronology
World Statesman (1956)	Dizzy in Greece (1957)	Dizzy Gillespie and Stuff Smith (1957)

Dizzy in Greece is an album by trumpeter Dizzy Gillespie, recorded in 1956 and 1957 and released on the Verve label.

== Release history ==
The album was reissued as part of the 2CD compilation Birks Works: The Verve Big Band Sessions.

== Reception ==
The AllMusic review awarded the album 4.5 stars.

Professional ratings
Review scores
Source	Rating
AllMusic	4.5/5 stars
The Encyclopedia of Popular Music	3/5 stars

== Track listing ==
Side A

1. "Hey Pete" (Dizzy Gillespie, Buster Harding, Lester Peterson) – 5:39
2. "Yesterdays" (Otto Harbach, Jerome Kern) – 3:46
3. "Tin Tin Deo" (Gil Fuller, Gillespie, Chano Pozo) – 4:17
4. "Groovin' for Nat" (Ernie Wilkins) – 3:21
5. "Annie's Dance" (Melba Liston) – 4:05

Side B

1. "Cool Breeze" (Tadd Dameron, Billy Eckstine, Gillespie) – 4:55
2. "School Days" (Will D. Cobb, Gus Edwards) – 4:23
3. "That's All" (Pete Anson, composer and arranger) – 3:13
4. "Stablemates" (Benny Golson) – 4:12
5. "Groovin' High" (Gillespie) – 3:53
- Recorded in New York City on May 18 or 19 (Side A, track 1), June 6, 1956 (Side A, tracks 2-– and Side B, tracks 1 & 2) and April 7 & 8, 1957 (Side B, tracks 3–5)

== Personnel ==
=== May 18 or 19th and June 6th, 1956 ===
- Dizzy Gillespie, Joe Gordon, Quincy Jones, Ermit V. Perry, Carl Warwick – trumpet
- Rod Levitt, Melba Liston, Frank Rehak – trombone
- Jimmy Powell, Phil Woods – alto saxophone
- Billy Mitchell, Ernie Wilkins – tenor saxophone
- Marty Flax – baritone saxophone
- Walter Davis Jr. – piano
- Paul West – bass
- Charlie Persip – drums

=== April 7th & 8th, 1957 ===
- Dizzy Gillespie, Talib Daawud, Lee Morgan Ermit V. Perry, Carl Warwick – trumpet
- Al Grey – trombone
- Ernie Henry – alto saxophone
- Benny Golson – tenor saxophone
- Billy Root – baritone saxophone
- Wynton Kelly – piano
- Nelson Boyd – bass
- Charlie Persip – drums
