= The Dynamic Sound Patterns =

Studio album by Rod Levitt Orchestra
- Released: 1963
- Recorded: July 1963; New York City
- Genre: Jazz
- Length: 40:01
- Label: Riverside; RLP 471
- Producer: Ray Fowler

Rod Levitt chronology
The Dynamic Sound Patterns (1963)	The Rod Levitt Orchestra (1964)

The Dynamic Sound Patterns (subtitled of the Rod Levitt Orchestra) is the debut album led by American jazz trombonist Rod Levitt which was recorded in 1963 for the Riverside label.

== Reception ==
Professional ratings
Review scores
Source	Rating
AllMusic	3/5 stars
The Penguin Guide to Jazz Recordings	3.5/4 stars

AllMusic awarded the album 3 stars stating "even though Dynamic Sound Patterns isn't an orchestral project in the true sense, Levitt still gives the band a very big, full sound. There are eight musicians onboard -- five horns and a rhythm section -- but Levitt gives the illusion that he is leading a larger outfit... much of the material has a Thelonious Monk-influenced angularity. Dynamic Sound Patterns didn't make Levitt a huge name in the jazz world; nonetheless, this album is an enjoyable demonstration of his skills as both soloist and an arranger/bandleader".

== Track listing ==
All compositions by Rod Levitt

1. "Holler" - 9:08
2. "Ah! Spain" - 4:31
3. "Jelly Man" - 4:57
4. "Upper Bay" - 8:52
5. "El General" - 4:29
6. "His Master's Voice" - 8:04

== Personnel ==
- Rod Levitt - trombone, arranger, conductor
- Rolf Ericson - trumpet
- Buzz Renn - soprano saxophone, clarinet
- George Marge - tenor saxophone, clarinet, piccolo
- Gene Allen - baritone saxophone, clarinet
- Sy Johnson - piano
- John Beal - bass
- Ronnie Bedford - drums
