= Herb Ellis =

American jazz guitarist (1921–2010)

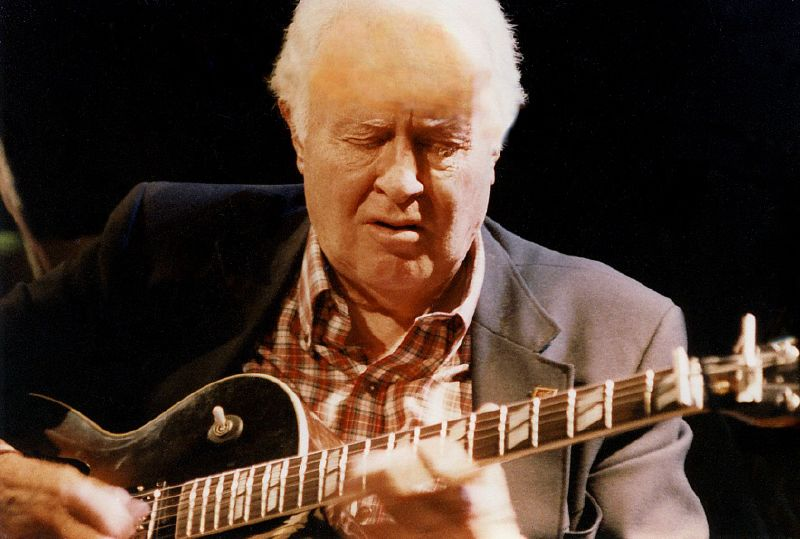

Background information
- Born: Mitchell Herbert Ellis; August 4, 1921; Farmersville, Texas, U.S.
- Died: March 28, 2010 (aged 88) Los Angeles, California, U.S.
- Genres: Jazz, swing, cool jazz, West Coast jazz
- Occupation: Musician
- Instrument: Guitar
- Years active: 1941–2010
- Labels: Verve, Concord Jazz, Justice

Mitchell Herbert Ellis (August 4, 1921 – March 28, 2010) was an American jazz guitarist. During the 1950s, he was in a trio with pianist Oscar Peterson.

== Biography ==
Born in Farmersville, Texas, Ellis was raised on a farm. He was first exposed to guitar music when he heard the Light Crust Doughboys on the radio. At the age of three, Ellis was playing harmonica, and banjo by six. Although his brother owned a guitar, he tuned it wrong. Ellis wanted to play better than his brother, so he bought a book to learn how to tune guitar properly, and his interest in guitar grew from there. He was ultimately inspired to pick up jazz guitar after hearing George Barnes on a radio program.

Ellis was proficient on the instrument by the time he entered North Texas State University. He majored in music, but because the university did not have a guitar program, he studied the bass. He dropped out of college and toured for six months with a band from the University of Kansas. From 1943–45 he joined Glen Gray and the Casa Loma Orchestra. After Gray's band, Ellis joined the Jimmy Dorsey band where he played some of his first recorded solos.

Ellis remained with Dorsey through 1947, traveling and recording extensively, and playing in dance halls and movie palaces. Lou Carter told journalist Robert Dupuis in a 1996 interview, "The Dorsey band had a six-week hole in the schedule. The three of us had played together some with the big band. John Frigo, who had already left the band, knew the owner of the Peter Stuyvesant Hotel in Buffalo. We went in there and stayed six months. And that's how the group the Soft Winds were born". Together with Frigo and Lou Carter, Ellis wrote the classic jazz standards "Detour Ahead" and "I Told Ya I Love Ya, Now Get Out".

The Soft Winds group was fashioned after the Nat King Cole Trio. They stayed together until 1952. Ellis then joined the Oscar Peterson Trio (replacing Barney Kessel) in 1953, forming what Scott Yanow would later on refer to as "one of the most memorable of all the piano, guitar, and bass trios in jazz history".

Ellis became prominent after performing with the Oscar Peterson Trio from 1953 to 1958, along with pianist Peterson and bassist Ray Brown. He was a somewhat controversial member of the trio, because he was the only white person in the group in a time when racism was still very much widespread.

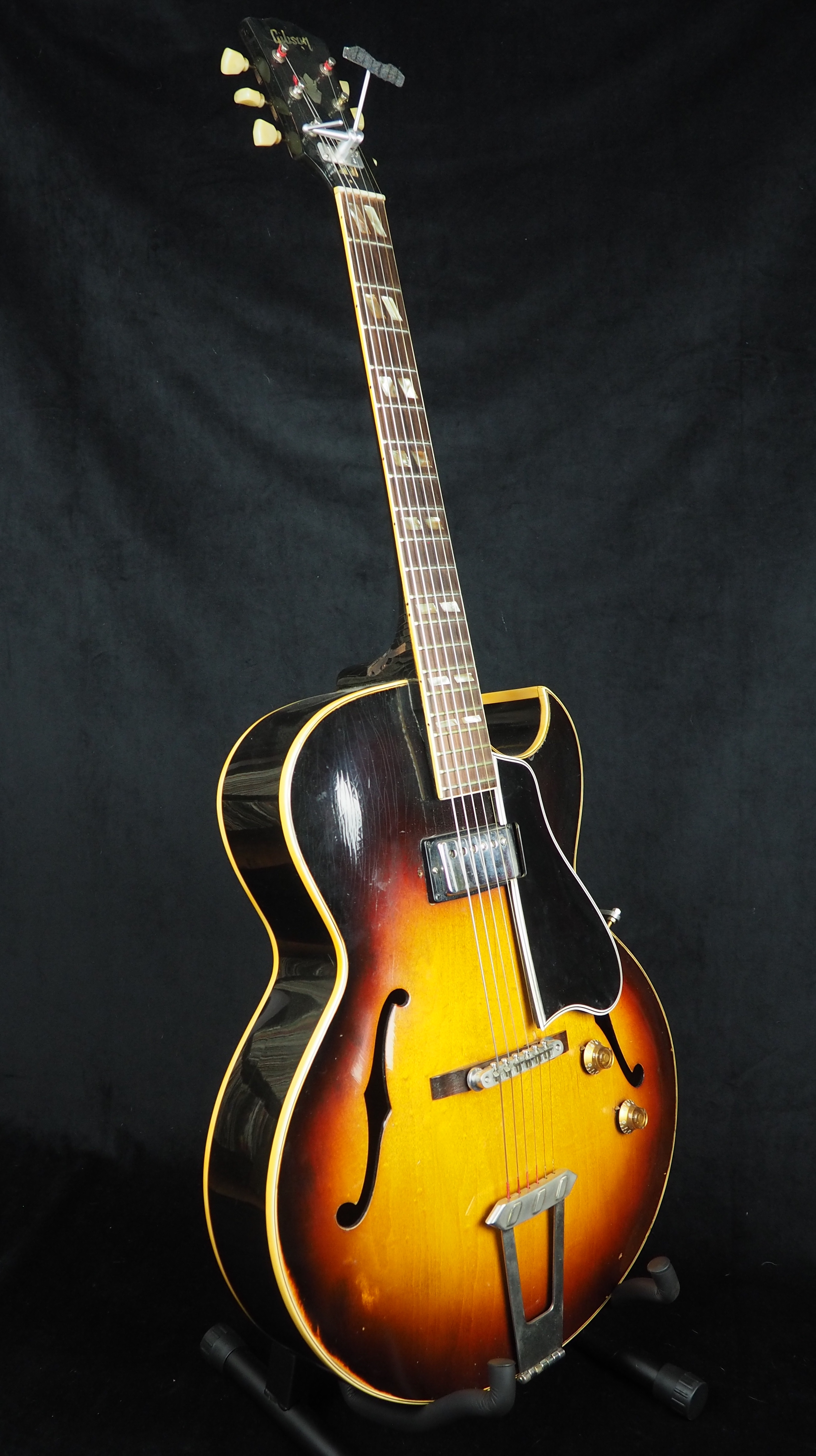
Herb Ellis's 1953 Gibson ES-175

In addition to their live and recorded work as the Oscar Peterson Trio, this unit usually with the addition of a drummer, served as the virtual "house rhythm section" for Norman Granz's Verve Records, supporting the likes of tenormen Ben Webster and Stan Getz, as well as trumpeters Dizzy Gillespie, Roy Eldridge, and Sweets Edison and other jazz stalwarts. Ellis was part of the rhythm section but did not solo on every track. With drummer Buddy Rich, they were also the backing band for popular "comeback" albums by the duet of Ella Fitzgerald and Louis Armstrong.

The trio were one of the mainstays of Granz's Jazz at the Philharmonic concerts as they swept the jazz world, almost constantly touring the United States and Europe. Ellis left the Peterson Trio in November 1958, to be replaced not by a guitarist, but by drummer Ed Thigpen. The years of 1957 through 1960 found Ellis touring with Ella Fitzgerald. In addition, Ellis was a mainstay in Hollywood recording studios playing on various types of sessions. Eventually, he left studio work to concentrate on his jazz career, both onstage and on records.

The three provided a stirring rendition of "Tenderly" as a jazz improvisational backdrop to John Hubley's 1958 cartoon The Tender Game.

With fellow jazz guitarists Barney Kessel, Charlie Byrd and later, Tal Farlow, he created another ensemble, the Great Guitars.

Herb Ellis was also featured on an episode of Sanford and Son accompanying Fred Sanford's singing.

Ellis gave guitar lessons to Gary Larson, who is best known for creating The Far Side comic strip. As payment, Larson drew a cover illustration for the album Doggin' Around (Concord, 1988) by Ellis and bassist Red Mitchell.

By 1987, Ellis had moved to Arkansas. In 1994, he joined the Arkansas Jazz Hall of Fame. On November 15, 1997, he received an Honorary Doctorate from the University of North Texas College of Music.

Ellis died of Alzheimer's disease at his Los Angeles home on the morning of March 28, 2010, at the age of 88.

== Discography ==
=== As leader ===
- Ellis in Wonderland (Norgran, 1956)
- Nothing but the Blues (Verve, 1957)
- Herb Ellis Meets Jimmy Giuffre (Verve, 1959)
- Softly...but with That Feeling (Verve, 1961)
- Three Guitars in Bossa Nova Time (Epic, 1963)
- Together! with Stuff Smith (Epic, 1963)
- 4 to Go! with Andre Previn (Columbia, 1963)
- Guitar/Guitar with Charlie Byrd (Columbia, 1965)
- Man with the Guitar (Dot, 1965)
- Herb Ellis and the All Stars (Epic, 1974)
- Soft Shoe (Concord Jazz, 1974)
- Seven, Come Eleven with Joe Pass (Concord Jazz, 1974)
- Jazz/Concord with Joe Pass (Concord Jazz, 1974)
- Two for the Road with Joe Pass (Pablo, 1974)
- Rhythm Willie with Freddie Green (Concord Jazz, 1975)
- In Session with Herb Ellis (Guitar Player, 1975)
- After You've Gone with Ray Brown, Harry "Sweets" Edison (Concord Jazz, 1975)
- Great Guitars with Charlie Byrd, Barney Kessel (Concord Jazz, 1976)
- A Pair to Draw To with Ross Tompkins (Concord Jazz, 1976)
- Poor Butterfly with Barney Kessel (Concord Jazz, 1977)
- Herb (Sony, 1978)
- Great Guitars: Straight Tracks with Charlie Byrd, Barney Kessel (Concord Jazz, 1978)
- Windflower with Remo Palmier (Concord Jazz, 1978)
- Soft & Mellow (Concord Jazz, 1979)
- Great Guitars at the Winery with Charlie Byrd, Barney Kessel (Concord Jazz, 1980)
- At Montreux Summer 1979 (Concord Jazz, 1980)
- Interplay with Cal Collins Concord Jazz, 1981)
- Great Guitars at Charlie's Georgetown with Charlie Byrd, Barney Kessel (Concord Jazz, 1983)
- Anniversary in Paris with Marc Hemmeler (Phoenix, 1986)
- Doggin' Around with Red Mitchell (Concord Jazz, 1989)
- Roll Call (Justice, 1991)
- Memories of You: A Tribute to Benny Goodman with Terry Gibbs, Buddy DeFranco (Contemporary, 1991)
- Texas Swings (Justice, 1992)
- The Jazz Masters with Ray Brown, Serge Ermoll (AIM, 1994)
- The Return of the Great Guitars with Charlie Byrd, Mundell Lowe, Larry Coryell (Concord Jazz, 1996)
- Down-Home (Justice, 1996)
- Herb Ellis Meets T. C. Pfeiler (Tonewheel, 1997)
- Burnin' (Acoustic Music, 1998)
- An Evening with Herb Ellis (Jazz Focus, 1998)
- Blues Variations (Live at EJ's, 1998)
- Conversations in Swing Guitar with Duke Robillard (Stony Plain, 1999)
- Great Guitars Live with Charlie Byrd, Barney Kessel (Concord 2001)
- More Conversations in Swing Guitar with Duke Robillard (Stony Plain, 2003)

With Monty Alexander and Ray Brown

- Trio (Concord Jazz, 1981)
- Triple Treat (Concord Jazz, 1982)
- Overseas Special (Concord Jazz, 1984)
- Triple Treat II (Concord Jazz, 1988)
- Triple Treat III (Concord Jazz, 1989)

As a member of the Oscar Peterson Trio

- Oscar Peterson Plays Count Basie (Verve, 1956)
- Oscar Peterson at the Stratford Shakespearean Festival (Verve, 1956)
- Pastel Moods (Verve, 1956)
- Oscar Peterson at the Concertgebouw (Verve, 1957)
- Oscar Peterson at the Stratford Shakespearean Festival (Verve, 1957)
- Soft Sands (Verve, 1957)
- The Modern Jazz Quartet and the Oscar Peterson Trio at the Opera House (Verve, 1957)
- The Oscar Peterson Trio with Sonny Stitt, Roy Eldridge and Jo Jones at Newport (ARS/Verve, 1957)
- On the Town with the Oscar Peterson Trio (Verve, 1958)
- Jazz at the Philharmonic Blues in Chicago 1955 (Verve, 1983) – rec. 1955
- Tenderly (Just a Memory, 2002) – rec. 1958
- Vancouver 1958 (Just a Memory, 2003) – rec. 1958

Reunion with Oscar Peterson

- Hello Herbie (MPS, 1970)
- The Legendary Oscar Peterson Trio Live at the Blue Note (Telarc, 1990)
- A Tribute to Oscar Peterson Live at The Town Hall (Telarc, 1997)

=== As sideman ===
With Benny Carter

- Benny Carter Plays Pretty (Norgran, 1954)
- New Jazz Sounds (Norgran, 1954)

With Roy Eldridge

- Rockin' Chair (Clef, 1953)
- Dale's Wail (Clef, 1953)
- Little Jazz (Clef, 1954)

With Stan Getz

- Stan Getz and the Oscar Peterson Trio (Verve, 1958)
- Jazz Giants '58 (Verve, 1958)

With Dizzy Gillespie

- Diz and Getz (Norgran, 1953)
- Roy and Diz with Roy Eldridge (Clef, 1954)
- For Musicians Only (Verve, 1956)

With Vince Guaraldi

- Alma-Ville (Warner Bros.-Seven Arts, 1969)
- It Was a Short Summer, Charlie Brown (Lee Mendelson Film Productions, 1969)
- A Boy Named Charlie Brown: Selections from the Film Soundtrack (Columbia Masterworks, 1970)
- A Boy Named Charlie Brown: Original Motion Picture Soundtrack (Kritzerland, 2017)

With Johnny Hartman

- Unforgettable Songs by Johnny Hartman (ABC, 1966)
- I Love Everybody (ABC, 1967)

With The Gene Harris All Star Big Band

- Tribute to Count Basie (Concord Jazz, 1988)

With Peggy Lee

- Sugar 'n' Spice (Capitol Records, 1962)
- Mink Jazz (Capitol Records, 1963)
- Guitars a là Lee (Capitol Records, 1966)

With Johnny Mathis

- Johnny Mathis (Columbia, 1956)

With Bud Shank

- Bud Shank Plays Music from Today's Movies (World Pacific, 1967)
- Magical Mystery (World Pacific, 1967)

With Lester Young

- Pres and Sweets with Harry Edison (Norgran, 1955)
- Laughin' to Keep from Cryin' (Verve, 1958)

With others

- Mel Brown, Chicken Fat (Impulse!, 1967)
- Priscilla Coolidge, Gypsy Queen (Sussex, 1970)
- Harry Edison, Gee Baby, Ain't I Good to You (Verve, 1957)
- Victor Feldman, Soviet Jazz Themes (Äva, 1962)
- Johnny Frigo, I Love John Frigo...He Swings (Mercury, 1957)
- The Four Freshmen, The Four Freshmen and Five Guitars (Capitol, 1959)
- Coleman Hawkins, Coleman Hawkins and Confrères (Verve, 1958)
- Illinois Jacquet, Swing's the Thing (Clef, 1956)
- Randy Newman, Randy Newman (Reprise, 1968)
- Esther Phillips, Confessin' the Blues (Atlantic, 1976)
- Lou Rawls, Lou Rawls Live! (Capitol, 1966)
- Gábor Szabó, Wind, Sky and Diamonds (Impulse!, 1967)
- Sonny Stitt, Only the Blues (Verve, 1958)
- Mel Tormé, A Day in the Life of Bonnie and Clyde (Liberty, 1968)
- Ben Webster, Soulville (Verve, 1957)
