= Lou Carter =

Background information
- Born: Louis Carter; September 15, 1918; Newark, New Jersey, U.S.
- Died: September 25, 2005 (aged 87) Glen Ridge, New Jersey, U.S.
- Genres: Jazz
- Occupation: Musician
- Instrument: Piano
- Labels: Arbors, Chesky

Louis Carter (September 15, 1918 – September 25, 2005) was an American jazz pianist, composer, and songwriter. He had a long yet low-profile career.

== Biography ==
Carter played in various big bands, especially those led by Jimmy Dorsey and Glenn Gray. In 1946, he founded the trio "The Soft Winds" together with Herb Ellis and Johnny Frigo. The group recorded on the Majestic and Mercury labels and wrote a number of hits, among them are "I Told Ya I Love Ya, Now Get Out" and "Detour Ahead". The latter became a jazz standard and was played by such prominent musicians as Billie Holiday, Sarah Vaughan, Ella Fitzgerald, Irene Kral, Stan Getz, and Woody Herman.

After the trio disbanded in 1950, Carter was a sideman for various bands and worked on two of Buck Clayton's studio albums. A reunion of the Soft Winds occurred during the 1995 Floating Jazz Festival. The double album Then and Now...: The Soft Winds, 1946–1996 was released. The album included previously unreleased radio recordings from 1947 to 1948 and 11 new tracks.

Carter also had a side career as a performer of novelty songs, in the persona of "Louie the Singing Cab Driver." Bronx-accented Louie was a regular on The Perry Como Show in the 1950s, and recorded an album in 1957 titled Louie's Love Songs. Tracks included "If I Had a Nose Full of Nickels" and "The Murials on the Wall." Louie Writes Again followed in 1958, containing songs like "I Don't Talk Very Good" and "Her Toot'brush Was Gone."

A longtime resident of Bloomfield, New Jersey, Carter died at the age of 87 at Mountainside Hospital in Glen Ridge, New Jersey.

== Discography ==
=== Studio albums ===
- How Deep Is Which Ocean? (1960)
- Louie Writes Again (1958)
- Louie's Love Songs (1957)

=== Songs ===
- "Detour Ahead"
- "I Told Ya I Love Ya, Now Get Out"
