= In Love Again! =

Studio album by Peggy Lee
- Released: 1964
- Recorded: May–December 1963
- Genre: Vocal jazz
- Length: 29:04
- Label: Capitol
- Producer: Dave Cavanaugh

Peggy Lee chronology
I'm a Woman (1963)	In Love Again! (1964)	In the Name of Love (1964)

Professional ratings
Review scores
Source	Rating
Allmusic	3/5 stars

In Love Again! is a 1964 studio album by Peggy Lee, arranged by Dick Hazard, Bill Holman and Shorty Rogers.

== Track listing ==
1. "A Lot of Livin' to Do" (Lee Adams, Charles Strouse) - 2:34
2. "I've Got Your Number" (Cy Coleman, Carolyn Leigh) - 1:59
3. "Little By Little" (Walter O'Keefe, Bobby Dolan) – 2:03
4. "Got That Magic" (Bill Schluger, Peggy Lee) – 1:40
5. "The Moment of Truth" (Frank Scott, Tex Satterwhite) – 1:53
6. "That's My Style" (Cy Coleman, Lee) – 2:38
7. "I Can't Stop Loving You" (Don Gibson) - 3:05
8. "Unforgettable" (Irving Gordon) - 2:25
9. "Once" (Ils S'aimaient) (Magenta, Marnay, Norman Gimbel) - 2:38
10. "(I'm) In Love Again (Lee, Cy Coleman) - 2:51
11. "I Got Lost In His Arms" (Irving Berlin) - 2:30
12. "How Insensitive" (Insensatez) (Norman Gimbel, Antônio Carlos Jobim) - 2:48
