= Beverly Peer =

American jazz musician

Beverly Peer (October 7, 1912 – January 16, 1997) was an American jazz double-bassist.

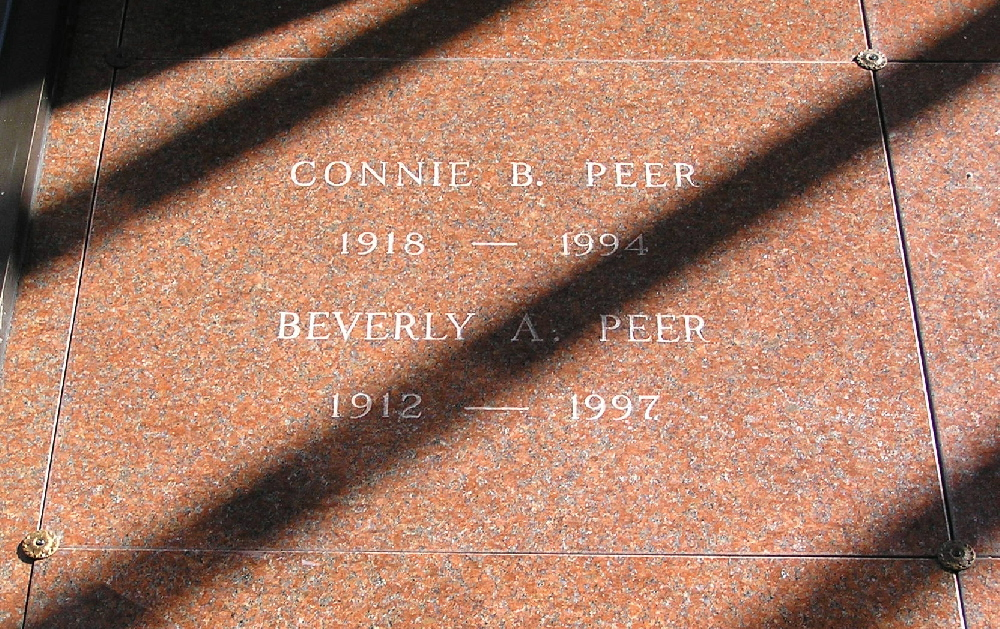
The crypt of Beverly Peer in Woodlawn Cemetery

Peer played piano professionally early in his career before switching to bass. He worked with Chick Webb from 1936 to 1939 and continued to play in the orchestra under the direction of Ella Fitzgerald. In 1942 he joined Sabby Lewis's orchestra. He also worked extensively as an accompanist for vocalists such as Sarah Vaughan, Lena Horne, Johnny Mathis, and Barbra Streisand. In the 1950s and 1960s he worked with pianists Barbara Carroll and Ellis Larkins, and worked with Bobby Short from the 1970s into the 1990s, often performing at the Cafe Carlyle in New York City.

He can be heard on Ella Fitzgerald's release "Ella Sings, Chick Swings" as well as other recordings of Ella and the Chick Webb Orchestra.

Aside from music, late in his career Peer also had cameo roles in films such as Hannah and Her Sisters and For Love or Money.

== Discography ==
As sideman

- 1953: Lucky Thompson & His Lucky Seven - Lucky Thompson, with Harold "Money" Johnson, Jimmy Powell, Clarence Williams, Earl Knight, Beverly Peer and Percy Brice.
