= Detour Ahead =

1948 jazz standard

Song
- Written: 1947
- Genre: Jazz standard
- Songwriters: Herb Ellis, Lou Carter, Johnny Frigo

"Detour Ahead" is a jazz standard with words and music credited to Herb Ellis, Johnny Frigo, and Lou Carter.

== Notable versions ==
- Billie Holiday with the Tiny Grimes Sextet (1951)
- Ella Fitzgerald (1959)
- Bill Evans Trio on the 1962 album Waltz for Debby
- Patti Page (1957)
- Teri Thornton (1961)
- Anita O'Day (1961)
- Della Reese
- Bev Kelly
- Dianne Reeves (1995)
- Jane Monheit

== See also ==
- List of 1940s jazz standards
