= Nelson Boyd =

American jazz musician (1928–1985)

Nelson Boyd (February 6, 1928, Camden, New Jersey – October 1985) was an American bebop jazz bassist.

== Biography ==
He was born in Camden, New Jersey, and played in local orchestras in Philadelphia around 1945, and then moved to New York City in 1947. While there, he played with Coleman Hawkins, Tadd Dameron, and Dexter Gordon, and later with Sarah Vaughan, Dizzy Gillespie, and Charlie Barnet in 1948. In 1947, he recorded with Fats Navarro and Charlie Parker, later with Jay Jay Johnson and Miles Davis on Davis's Birth of the Cool sessions in 1949. In addition, Davis's song "Half Nelson" was named after Boyd because of his height.

After 1949, he often played with Gillespie and toured the Middle East with him in 1956. Later, he recorded with Melba Liston in 1958 with her trombone ultimates on Melba Liston and Her 'Bones. He also did sessions with Max Roach and Thelonious Monk. Boyd's last recordings were in 1964.

== Discography ==
With Dizzy Gillespie

- Jazz Recital (Norgran, 1955)
- World Statesman (Norgran, 1956)
- Dizzy in Greece (Verve, 1957)
- Dizzy Gillespie's Big Band Jazz (American Recording Society, 1957)

With others

- Miles Davis, Birth of the Cool (Capitol, 1957)
- Milt Jackson, Meet Milt Jackson (Savoy, 1956)
- Charles McPherson, Bebop Revisited! (Prestige, 1965)
- Charlie Parker, Encores (Savoy, 1977)
- Max Roach, The Max Roach 4 Plays Charlie Parker (Mercury, 1959)
- Sonny Stitt, Bud Powell, J. J. Johnson, Sonny Stitt/Bud Powell/J. J. Johnson (Prestige, 1956)
