= Dizzy Gillespie and Stuff Smith =

Studio album by Dizzy Gillespie and Stuff Smith
- Released: 1957
- Recorded: April 17, 1957
- Studio: NYC
- Genre: Jazz
- Length: 42:11
- Label: Verve; MGV 8214
- Producer: Norman Granz

Dizzy Gillespie chronology
For Musicians Only (1957)	Dizzy Gillespie and Stuff Smith (1957)	Birks' Works (1958)

Dizzy Gillespie and Stuff Smith is an album by trumpeter Dizzy Gillespie and violinist Stuff Smith, recorded in 1957 and released on the Verve label.

== Reception ==
The AllMusic review awarded the album 4.5 stars.

Professional ratings
Review scores
Source	Rating
AllMusic	4.5/5 stars
The Encyclopedia of Popular Music	4/5 stars

== Track listing ==
=== Side A ===
1. "Rio Pakistan" (Dizzy Gillespie) – 11:31
2. "It's Only a Paper Moon" (Harold Arlen, E. Y. Harburg, Billy Rose) – 8:28
3. "Purple Sounds" (Gillespie, Stuff Smith) – 10:08

=== Side B ===
1. "Russian Lullaby" (Irving Berlin) – 7:57
2. "Oh, Lady Be Good!" (George Gershwin, Ira Gershwin) – 4:11

== Personnel ==
- Dizzy Gillespie – trumpet
- Stuff Smith – violin
- Wynton Kelly – piano
- Paul West – bass
- J. C. Heard – drums
- The Gordon Family: George Gordon, George Gordon Jr., Richard Gordon, Honey Gordon – vocal group (track 5)
