= Marty Flax =

American jazz musician

Marty Flax, born Martin Flachsenhaar Jr. in New York City (October 7, 1924 – July 3, 1972) was an American jazz saxophonist. Flax also played flute, clarinet, and trombone

He was a baritone saxophonist in the bands of Louis Jordan, Dizzy Gillespie, Perez Prado, and Tito Puente, and played on soundtracks composed by Raymond Scott. He worked with Les Elgart and Claude Thornhill in the late 1950s, then with Quincy Jones, Melba Liston and Gillespie, including on State Department tours of the Middle East and South America. Early in the 1960s he again toured South America with the Woody Herman orchestra. When not on tour he led a house band at the Cafe Society. He also worked with Buddy Rich and Sammy Davis Jr.

== Discography ==
With Dizzy Gillespie

- World Statesman (Norgran, 1956)
- Dizzy in Greece (Verve, 1957)
- Dizzy Gillespie's Big Band Jazz (American Recording Society, 1957)

With Woody Herman

- Woody Herman (Capitol, 1955)
- Herman's Heat & Puente's Beat! (Everest, 1958)
- Early Autumn (Capitol, 1971)
- Second Herd (Capitol, 1982)

With others

- Melba Liston, Melba Liston and Her 'Bones (Fresh Sound, 2006)
- Sam Most, I'm Nuts About the Most....Sam That Is! (Bethlehem, 1955)
- Sam Most, Plays Bird, Bud, Monk and Miles (Bethlehem, 1957)
- Nat Pierce, The Ballad of Jazz Street (Zim, 1980)
- Frank Rehak, Jazzville Vol. 2 (Dawn, 1987)
- Buddy Rich, Sammy Davis Jr., The Sounds of '66 (Reprise, 1966)
- Buddy Rich, Swingin' New Big Band (Pacific Jazz, 1966)
- Buddy Rich, Big Swing Face (Pacific Jazz, 1967)
- Bobby Scott, Bobby Scott and 2 Horns (ABC-Paramount, 1956)
- Pete Rugolo, Rugolomania (Columbia, 1955)
- Pete Rugolo, New Sounds by Pete Rugolo (Harmony, 1957)
