= The Complete Blue Note Fifties Sessions =

Compilation album by Gil Mellé
- Released: 1998
- Recorded: March 2, 1952, January 31 & October 25, 1953, September 5, 1954, February 27, 1955 and April 1, 1956
- Studios: Van Gelder Studio, Hackensack, NJ
- Genre: Jazz
- Length: 137:56
- Label: Blue Note
- Producers: Gil Mellé, Alfred Lion

Gil Mellé chronology
The Complete Blue Note Fifties Sessions (1998)	Patterns in Jazz (1956)

Gil Mellé Quintet/Sextet Cover

Gil Mellé Quintet with Urbie Green and Tal Farlow Cover

5 Impressions of Color Cover

The Complete Blue Note Fifties Sessions is a compilation of saxophonist, composer and bandleader Gil Mellé's recordings from 1952 to 1956 which were released on the Blue Note label. They were originally released as four 10 inch LPs; Gil Mellé Quintet/Sextet (which featured Rudy Van Gelder's first issued recordings); Gil Mellé Quintet with Urbie Green and Tal Farlow; Gil Mellé Quartet featuring Lou Mecca; 5 Impressions of Color; and a 12-inch LP Patterns in Jazz.

== Reception ==
Professional ratings
Review scores
Source	Rating
Allmusic	4.5/5 stars

Allmusic awarded the album 4½ stars and Richard S. Ginell stated "this collection leaves little doubt that he was (and remains) a marvelous saxophonist and an intriguing composer who hasn't been given his due". On All About Jazz John Sharpe said "These extremely rare sessions contain a mix of straight bop, a number of standards and many of Melle's unique third stream compositions. Melle's use of a guitar (Tal Farlow, Lou Mecca and Joe Cinderella) in place of a piano was seen as a bold, innovative step ... Although these discs do contain some sonic imperfections they remain a valuable document of one of the most cerebral and creative figures in jazz".

== Track listing ==
All compositions by Gil Mellé except where noted

Disc One:

1. "Four Moons" – 2:23 Originally released on Gil Mellé Quintet/Sextet
2. "The Gears" – 3:06 Originally released on Gil Mellé Quintet/Sextet
3. "Mars" – 2:46 Originally released on Gil Mellé Quintet/Sextet
4. "Sunset Concerto" – 2:03 Originally released on Gil Mellé Quintet/Sextet
5. "Cyclotron" – 3:13 Originally released on Gil Mellé Quintet/Sextet
6. "October" – 3:41 Originally released on Gil Mellé Quintet/Sextet
7. "Under Capricorn" – 2:58 Originally released on Gil Mellé Quintet/Sextet
8. "Venus" – 3:40 Originally released on Gil Mellé Quintet/Sextet
9. "Lover Man" (Jimmy Davis, Ram Ramirez, Jimmy Sherman) – 5:55 Originally released on Gil Mellé Quintet with Urbie Green and Tal Farlow
10. "Spellbound" (Miklós Rózsa) – 3:18 Originally released on Gil Mellé Quintet with Urbie Green and Tal Farlow
11. "Transition" – 5:12 Originally released on Gil Mellé Quintet with Urbie Green and Tal Farlow
12. "A Lion Lives Here" – 3:50 Originally released on Gil Mellé Quintet with Urbie Green and Tal Farlow
13. "Timepiece" – 3:10 Originally released on Gil Mellé Quintet with Urbie Green and Tal Farlow
14. "Gingersnap" – 3:17 Originally released on Gil Mellé Quintet with Urbie Green and Tal Farlow
15. "The Nearness of You" (Hoagy Carmichael, Ned Washington) – 4:17 Previously unreleased
16. "Lullaby of Birdland" (George Shearing, George David Weiss) – 3:46 Originally released on Gil Mellé Quartet featuring Lou Mecca
17. "Ballad for Guitar" – 3:53 Originally released on Gil Mellé Quartet featuring Lou Mecca
18. "Metropolitan" – 2:50 Originally released on Gil Mellé Quartet featuring Lou Mecca
19. "Newport News" – 4:55 Originally released on Gil Mellé Quartet featuring Lou Mecca
- Recorded at Van Gelder Studio, Hackensack, New Jersey on March 2, 1952 (tracks 1–4), January 31, 1953 (tracks 5–8), October 25, 1953 (tracks 9–15) and September 5, 1954 (tracks 16–19)

Disc Two:

1. "Summertime" (George Gershwin) – 3:59 Originally released on Gil Mellé Quartet featuring Lou Mecca
2. "Quadrille for Moderns" – 3:31 Originally released on Gil Mellé Quartet featuring Lou Mecca
3. "Five Impressions of Color: Spectrum Violet/Sea Green/Royal Blue/Ebony" – 12:37 Originally released on 5 Impressions of Color
4. "Life Begins at Midnight" – 4:24 Originally released on 5 Impressions of Color
5. "Night Train to Wildwood" – 4:10 Originally released on 5 Impressions of Color
6. "Threadneedle Street" – 4:15 Originally released on 5 Impressions of Color
7. "Weird Valley" – 5:13 Originally released on Patterns in Jazz
8. "The Set Break" – 4:48 Originally released on Patterns in Jazz
9. "Moonlight in Vermont" (John Blackburn, Karl Suessdorf) – 4:52 Originally released on Patterns in Jazz
10. "Long Ago (And Far Away)" (Ira Gershwin, Jerome Kern) – 4:32 Originally released on Patterns in Jazz
11. "The Arab Barber Blues" – 9:05 Originally released on Patterns in Jazz
12. "Nice Questions" – 8:17 Originally released on Patterns in Jazz
- Recorded at Van Gelder Studio, Hackensack, New Jersey on September 5, 1954 (tracks 1 & 2), February 27, 1955 (tracks 3–6) and April 1, 1956 (tracks 7–12).

== Personnel ==
- Gil Mellé – tenor saxophone, baritone saxophone
- Eddie Bert – trombone (Disc One: tracks 1–8, Disc Two: tracks 7–12)
- Urbie Green – trombone (Disc One: tracks 9–15)
- Don Butterfield – tuba (Disc Two: tracks 3–6)
- George Wallington – piano (Disc One: tracks 1–4)
- Tal Farlow – guitar (Disc One: tracks 5–15)
- Lou Mecca – guitar (Disc One: tracks 16–19, Disc Two: tracks 1–6)
- Joe Cinderella – guitar (Disc Two: tracks 7–12)
- Red Mitchell – bass (Disc One: tracks 1–4)
- Clyde Lombardi – bass (Disc One: tracks 5–15)
- Bill Phillips – bass (Disc One: tracks 16–19, Disc Two: tracks 1–6)
- Oscar Pettiford – bass (Disc Two: tracks 7–12)
- Joe Manning – vibraphone (Disc One: tracks 1–4)
- Max Roach – drums (Disc One: tracks 1–4)
- Joe Morello – drums (Disc One: tracks 5–15)
- Vinnie Thomas – drums (Disc One: tracks 16–19, Disc Two: tracks 1–6)
- Ed Thigpen – drums (Disc Two: tracks 7–12)
- Monica Dell – vocals (Disc One: tracks 2–4)
