= Oscar Peterson Plays Porgy & Bess =

Studio album by Oscar Peterson
- Released: 1959
- Recorded: October 12, 1959
- Genre: Jazz
- Length: 49:11
- Label: Verve Records
- Producer: Norman Granz

Oscar Peterson chronology
Oscar Peterson Plays the Harold Arlen Songbook (1959)	Oscar Peterson Plays Porgy & Bess (1959)	Swinging Brass with the Oscar Peterson Trio (1959)

Professional ratings
Review scores
Source	Rating
Allmusic	4/5 stars
The Penguin Guide to Jazz Recordings	4/4 stars

Oscar Peterson Plays Porgy & Bess is a 1959 studio album by Oscar Peterson, playing selections from George Gershwin's 1935 opera, Porgy and Bess.

== Track listing ==
1. "I Got Plenty O' Nuttin'" – 6:26
2. "I Wants to Stay Here" (also known as "I Love You Porgy" – 6:22
3. "Summertime" – 3:50
4. "Oh, Dey's So Fresh and Fine" – 0:55
5. "Oh, Lawd, I'm on My Way!" – 2:35
6. "It Ain't Necessarily So" (George Gershwin, Ira Gershwin) – 4:01
7. "There's a Boat Dat's Leavin' Soon for New York" – 7:13
8. "Oh Bess, Oh Where's My Bess?" – 4:56
9. "Here Come de Honey Man" – 1:11
10. "Bess, You Is My Woman Now" – 3:28

All songs composed by George Gershwin, with all lyrics by Ira Gershwin and Dubose Heyward, unless otherwise indicated.

== Personnel ==
Recorded October 12, 1959, Los Angeles, California:

=== Performance ===
- Oscar Peterson - piano
- Ray Brown - double bass
- Ed Thigpen - drums

=== Production ===
- Norman Granz - producer
- Batt Brown - assistant producer
- Jon Schapiro
- Aric Lach Morrison
- Benny Green - liner notes
- Suha Gur - mastering
- Michael Lang - supervisor
- David Lau - director, art direction
- Herman Leonard - photography
- Nausica Loukakos - design
- David Stone Martin - artwork
- Phil Schaap - research, restoration

== See also ==
- Porgy and Bess (Oscar Peterson and Joe Pass album)
