= Billy Phipps =

American jazz musician (1931-2011)

Billy Phipps (25 December 1931 – 3 December 2011) was an American jazz baritone saxophonist and composer who contributed to the development of a wide range of jazz styles, including hard bop, soul jazz, Latin jazz, and primitive.

== Career ==
Phipps was born on December 25, 1931, in Newark, New Jersey, United States into a jazz family. Billy's cousin, Eugene Phipps, Sr., toured nationally with artists such as Billie Holiday, Joe Guy, Max Roach, and Ike Quebec. Another cousin, Ernie Phipps, led the big band The Monarchs of Rhythm with Eugene Phipps, Sr. at the Savoy Ballroom alongside The Sultans of Swing, Poncho Diggs, and other big bands. During the 1950s, Eugene Phipps co-led the house band at Newark's legendary Washington Bar, which featured performers such as Babs Gonzales, Lew-Rew Jordan, and Ike Quebec.

In the 1950s, Billy Phipps and his brother Nat Phipps formed a band whose members included Wayne Shorter, Grachan Moncur, Chris White, Charlie Mason, Harold Phipps, and Robert Thomas. Phipps began his jazz career playing bebop on flute and baritone saxophone. As a teenager, Phipps was a regular in Newark and New York bands, and once opened for Billie Holiday. In 1960, the Phipps brothers' band broke up to form the Mega Tones. Billy Phipps later left the Mega Tones to tour with Buddy Johnson, Dizzy Gillespie and his Big Band, The Ray Charles Band, and "Brother" Jack McDuff. Encouraged by Wayne Shorter who introduced him to John Coltrane, Phipps began shifting to hard bop in his style. Despite a significant jazz career, the lack of Phipps's notoriety (as well as that of other black jazz performers) has been attributed to the reportage of white jazz critics.

== Recording and performance ==
Phipps recorded baritone sax on several seminal jazz albums, including Primitive Modern with the Gil Melle Quartet (1956), Gin and Orange (1969) with Brother Jack McDuff, and Ocho (1972) with Chico Mendoza. Phipps performed internationally, touring Sweden, France, England, and the Netherlands with McDuff's band. Phipps was a featured performer in 2003 during the Jazz Foundation of America's Annual "Great Night In Harlem" Concert at the Apollo Theater, hosted by Bill Cosby, Chevy Chase, Whoopi Goldberg, and Branford Marsalis. Despite failing health, Phipps continued to perform live in the New York city area and to record with other notable jazz musicians. In an homage to his Newark origins, Phipps performed with the Newark Jazz Elders, whose members provided a generational bridge between 1950s bebop and contemporary jazz.

== Selected discography ==
- Primitive Modern – Gil Melle Quartet (LP), Prestige Records, 1956
- Gin and Orange – Jack McDuff (Album, CD), Cadet, 1969
- Ocho (LP, Album), West Side Latino Records, 1972
- Joy of Cookin' – Joe Thomas (LP), Groove Merchant, 1972
- Tornado (LP), El Sonido, 1976
- Mamey Colora'o / Sneakin' Up Behind You (LP), El Sonido, 1976
- Sabroso!: The Afro-Latin Groove (LP), Rhino Records, 1998
- Ocho (The First Album) (CD, Album, RE), Universal Sound 2000
- The Woman in Me (CD),

Laranah Phipps Flat 5 Records (USA), 2001

- Moon Rappin' (CD), Blue Note Records (USA), 2002
- Phipps & Friends (CD), Pipeline Music (USA), 2010
