= A Jazz Portrait of Frank Sinatra =

Studio album by Oscar Peterson
- Released: 1959
- Recorded: May 18, 1959
- Genre: Jazz
- Length: 34:43
- Label: Verve
- Producer: Norman Granz

Oscar Peterson chronology
Sonny Stitt Sits In with the Oscar Peterson Trio (1958)	A Jazz Portrait of Frank Sinatra (1959)	The Jazz Soul of Oscar Peterson (1959)

A Jazz Portrait of Frank Sinatra is a 1959 album by the Oscar Peterson trio, recorded in tribute to singer Frank Sinatra.

== Reception ==
Professional ratings
Review scores
Source	Rating
AllMusic	3/5 stars
The Penguin Guide to Jazz Recordings	3.5/4 stars

For AllMusic, critic Scott Yanow wrote, "This is not one of Oscar Peterson's most essential dates, but it is swinging and enjoyable."

== Track listing ==
1. "You Make Me Feel So Young" (Mack Gordon, Josef Myrow) – 2:40
2. "Come Dance with Me" (Sammy Cahn, Jimmy Van Heusen) – 2:22
3. "Learnin' the Blues" (Dolores Vicki Silvers) – 3:41
4. "Witchcraft" (Cy Coleman, Carolyn Leigh) – 3:12
5. "(Love Is) The Tender Trap" (Cahn, Van Heusen) – 2:44
6. "Saturday Night (Is the Loneliest Night of the Week)" (Cahn, Jule Styne) – 2:57
7. "Just in Time" (Betty Comden, Adolph Green, Styne) – 1:53
8. "It Happened in Monterey" (Billy Rose, Mabel Wayne) – 2:57
9. "I Get a Kick Out of You" (Cole Porter) – 3:03
10. "All of Me" (Seymour Simons, Gerald Marks) – 3:25
11. "The Birth of the Blues" (Ray Henderson, Buddy DeSylva, Lew Brown) – 2:38
12. "How About You?" (Ralph Freed, Burton Lane) – 3:11

== Personnel ==
- Oscar Peterson – piano
- Ray Brown – double bass
- Ed Thigpen – drums
