= Bursting Out with the All-Star Big Band! =

Studio album by Oscar Peterson
- Released: 1962
- Recorded: June 13–15 & 24, 1962
- Genre: Jazz
- Length: 32:18
- Label: Verve
- Producer: Norman Granz

Oscar Peterson chronology
West Side Story (1962)	Bursting Out with the All-Star Big Band! (1962)	Affinity (1962)

Professional ratings
Review scores
Source	Rating
AllMusic	4/5 stars
DownBeat	2.5/5 stars
New Record Mirror	4/5 stars

Bursting Out with the All-Star Big Band! is a 1962 studio album by Oscar Peterson.

== Track listing ==
1. "Blues for Big Scotia" (Oscar Peterson) – 5:55
2. "West Coast Blues" (Wes Montgomery) – 3:57
3. "Here's That Rainy Day" (Jimmy Van Heusen, Johnny Burke) – 4:03
4. "I Love You" (Cole Porter) – 2:39
5. "Daahoud" (Clifford Brown) – 2:57
6. "Tricrotism" (Oscar Pettiford) – 4:12
7. "I'm Old Fashioned" (Jerome Kern, Johnny Mercer) – 4:27
8. "Young and Foolish" (Arnold B. Horwitt, Albert Hague) – 4:51
9. "Manteca" (Dizzy Gillespie, Gil Fuller, Chano Pozo) – 4:04

== Personnel ==
- Oscar Peterson - piano
- Ray Brown - double bass
- Ed Thigpen - drums
- Nat Adderley - cornet
- Roy Eldridge - trumpet
- Jimmy Nottingham
- Ernie Royal
- Snooky Young
- Clark Terry - trumpet, flugelhorn
- Jimmy Cleveland - trombone
- Paul Faulise
- Slide Hampton
- Melba Liston
- Britt Woodman
- Ray Alonge - french horn
- Jim Buffington
- Willie Ruff
- Morris Secon
- Julius Watkins
- Don Butterfield - tuba
- Cannonball Adderley - alto saxophone
- Norris Turney
- James Moody - tenor saxophone
- Jerome Richardson
- George Dorsey - baritone saxophone
- Seldon Powell
- Ernie Wilkins - conductor, arranger
