= Toshiko – Her Trio, Her Quartet =

Toshiko - Her Trio, Her Quartet

Studio album by Toshiko Akiyoshi
- Released: 1956
- Recorded: July 1956
- Venue: New York City
- Genre: Jazz
- Label: Storyville

Toshiko Akiyoshi chronology
The Toshiko Trio (1956)	Toshiko - Her Trio, Her Quartet (1956)	Toshiko and Leon Sash at Newport (1957)

Professional ratings
Review scores
Source	Rating
AllMusic	3/5 stars

Toshiko – Her Trio, Her Quartet is a jazz album recorded by pianist Toshiko Akiyoshi in New York, in 1956, and released on the Storyville record label. The album cover artwork is taken from Joan Miró's "Black and Red" series.

== Track listing ==
LP side A

1. "Kelo" (J. J. Johnson) – 4:20
2. "Salute to Shorty" (Akiyoshi) – 3:06
3. "Pea, Bee and Lee" (Akiyoshi) – 3:15
4. "Taking a Chance on Love" (Duke, Latouche, Fetter) – 4:34

LP side B

1. "All the Things You Are" (Kern) – 4:32
2. "No Moon at All" (Evans, Mann) – 4:52
3. "I'll Remember April" (DePaul, Raye, Johnston) – 5:30
4. "Thou Swell" (Rodgers, Hart) – 4:55

== Personnel ==
Tracks 1, 2, 4, 5, 7:

- Toshiko Akiyoshi – piano
- Boots Mussulli – alto saxophone
- Ed Thigpen – drums
- Wyatt Ruther – bass

Tracks 3, 6, 8:

- Toshiko Akiyoshi – piano
- Roy Haynes – drums
- Oscar Pettiford – bass
