= Tome VI =

Tome VI may refer to:

- Tome VI (Ange album), 1977
- Tome VI (Gil Mellé album), 1968
