= Jutta Hipp =

German jazz pianist and composer (1925–2003)

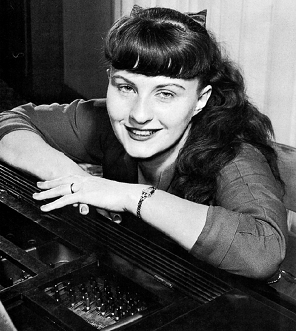

Background information
- Born: February 4, 1925; Leipzig, Weimar Republic
- Died: April 7, 2003 (aged 78) Sunnyside, Queens, New York City, U.S.
- Genre: Jazz
- Occupations: Musician, composer
- Instrument: Piano
- Years active: 1940s–1958

Jutta Hipp (4 February 1925 – 7 April 2003) was a German jazz pianist who was a pioneer of jazz in post-war Germany and was also active in the United States.

After a career of approximately ten years as a jazz musician in Germany, during which she led a quintet that introduced Germany to bebop and cool jazz, she was discovered by an Anglo-American jazz critic and record producer who encouraged her to emigrate to the United States. However, she subsequently fell out with him and, just two years after her arrival in America, abandoned her career in jazz to work as a seamstress in a factory, following a surprising rhythm and blues tour in the southern United States in 1957.

In 1955, known as the "First Lady of European Jazz", she became the first European and the first white female musician to sign a recording contract with the prestigious American record label Blue Note Records, on which she released three albums in 1956. For reasons that are unclear, Hipp's last recording was in 1956. She started working in a clothing factory, and ultimately cut herself off from the music world. She remained in the United States, and worked for the clothing company for 35 years.

Jutta Hipp was also a painter, draughtswoman, photographer, and designer.

== Early life ==
Jutta Hipp was born on 4 February 1925 in Leipzig, Germany, to Karl Julius Hipp and Hulda Elisabeth Grassmann. Her family was middle class, with a Protestant background. She began playing the piano at the age of nine and studied painting in Germany. She was eight years old when Adolf Hitler became Chancellor in 1933 and fourteen when Germany invaded Poland in 1939. Jazz was disapproved of by the Nazi regime, but Hipp listened to it during "clandestine gatherings in friends' homes and [...] during bombing raids. Instead of joining her parents and brother in the basement shelter [...] she hunkered down in front of the radio transcribing jazz tunes played on forbidden radio stations." When the Second World War began, she was studying at the Academy of Graphic Arts in Leipzig.

Like millions of other German civilians, she endured the massive bombing raids on her native city of Leipzig. In early July 1945, Soviet troops took control of Leipzig from American forces. In 1946, because she refused to produce posters for communist propaganda, Jutta and her family fled to the American Zone in West Germany and settled in Munich. At the age of 21, she became a displaced person and suffered from malnutrition.

In 1948, at the age of 23, Jutta gave birth to a son, Lionel (named after Lionel Hampton), whose father was a black American soldier stationed in Germany. Black GIs were not permitted at that time to acknowledge paternity if they had a child with a white woman, which meant that Jutta and the father of Lionel were not married. She placed her son Lionel in a children's home because she was unable to provide for him, but also because of the prejudice that prevailed at the time against "Brown Babies" and their mothers, as well as the need to be frequently available to perform as a pianist in American army clubs.

== Piano studies (1934–1939) ==
Jutta Hipp began taking private lessons in classical piano at the age of nine, but after four years, a strict teacher extinguished her enthusiasm for the instrument, and she ceased studying classical piano in 1939.

== Discovery of jazz under the Nazi regime (1940–1945) ==
Jutta Hipp first encountered jazz around 1940, when her friend Ingfried Henze, a fellow art student, took her to a meeting of the Hot Club, some of whose gatherings took place even during bombing raids. Since the Nazis strongly opposed jazz, which they denounced as "degenerate Negro music" produced by racially inferior people, German jazz musicians were continually at risk. In private homes, people listened to illegal jazz records and broadcasts from prohibited radio stations such as BBC London and Hilversum. She began collecting records.

Jutta Hipp resumed piano lessons and began composing, taking as her models jazz pianists such as Teddy Wilson, Fats Waller, and Art Tatum. After American units occupied the city in mid-April 1945, jazz music resounded from their headquarters at the Hotel Fürstenhof, and the American Forces Network radio station broadcast jazz.

In a letter to an American soldier written after the end of the war, she stated: "For us, jazz is a kind of religion. We really had to fight for it. I remember nights when we did not go to the shelter because we were listening to records. And although bombs were falling around us, we felt safe, or at least, if we had been killed, we would have died with beautiful music."

== Musical career (1946–1957) ==
=== Jazz career in Germany (1946–1955) ===
In 1946, Hipp became a professional musician out of necessity: although she aspired to pursue a career as a painter, it would have been impossible to earn a living in that field in the devastated post-war Germany.

Hipp began her musical career in southern Bavaria, performing in American officers' clubs in Tegernsee, alongside her fiancé Teddie Neubert and jazz guitarist Thomas Buhé. She also performed in Munich with Freddie Brocksieper, Charlie Tabor, and Hans Koller.

Hipp worked with saxophonist Hans Koller from 1951, touring in Germany and other countries. They recorded together in 1952. In 1952, she moved with Hans Koller to Frankfurt, where American army clubs provided numerous opportunities for young jazz musicians. Koller's ensemble included Albert Mangelsdorff on trombone, Shorty Röder on double bass, and drummers Rudi Sehring and Karl Sanner, with Hipp on piano. In March 1953, Koller's New Jazz Stars served as the opening act for Dizzy Gillespie in Frankfurt. The group made radio recordings and appeared at the German Jazz Festival. Koller's admiration for Lester Young had a profound influence on her own playing style.

Her playing, which had previously been at an amateur level, developed into a fully professional style in the early 1950s, such that she was voted the best pianist in Germany in polls in 1952 and 1954, ahead of Paul Kuhn.

In 1953, Hipp formed her own quintet, consisting of Emil Mangelsdorff on alto saxophone, Joki Freund on tenor saxophone, Hans Kresse on bass, and Karl Sanner on drums, with frequent guest soloists including Albert Mangelsdorff on trombone, Carlo Bohländer on trumpet, and Attila Zoller on guitar. Like many young European musicians of the period, she was influenced by the work of Lennie Tristano, and the Jutta Hipp Quintet drew inspiration from the cool jazz style popularized by Tristano, Lee Konitz, and Warne Marsh. She performed with this quintet, which she led from 1953 to 1955, at the inaugural German Jazz Festival in 1953.

In 1954, Hipp played with Attila Zoller. In January of the same year, critic Leonard Feather heard Hipp in Germany, around three years after being sent a recording of her playing by one of her friends. He booked an April recording session for her; the resulting album was released two years later. With her subsequent group (1954–1955), which included guitarist Attila Zoller, a Romani musician in the tradition of Django Reinhardt, she consolidated her reputation as the "First Lady of European Jazz".. In 1954, she performed at the German Jazz Festival with Albert Mangelsdorff and Zoller, as well as in a session with Hugo Strasser.

=== Discovery by Leonard Feather (1954) ===
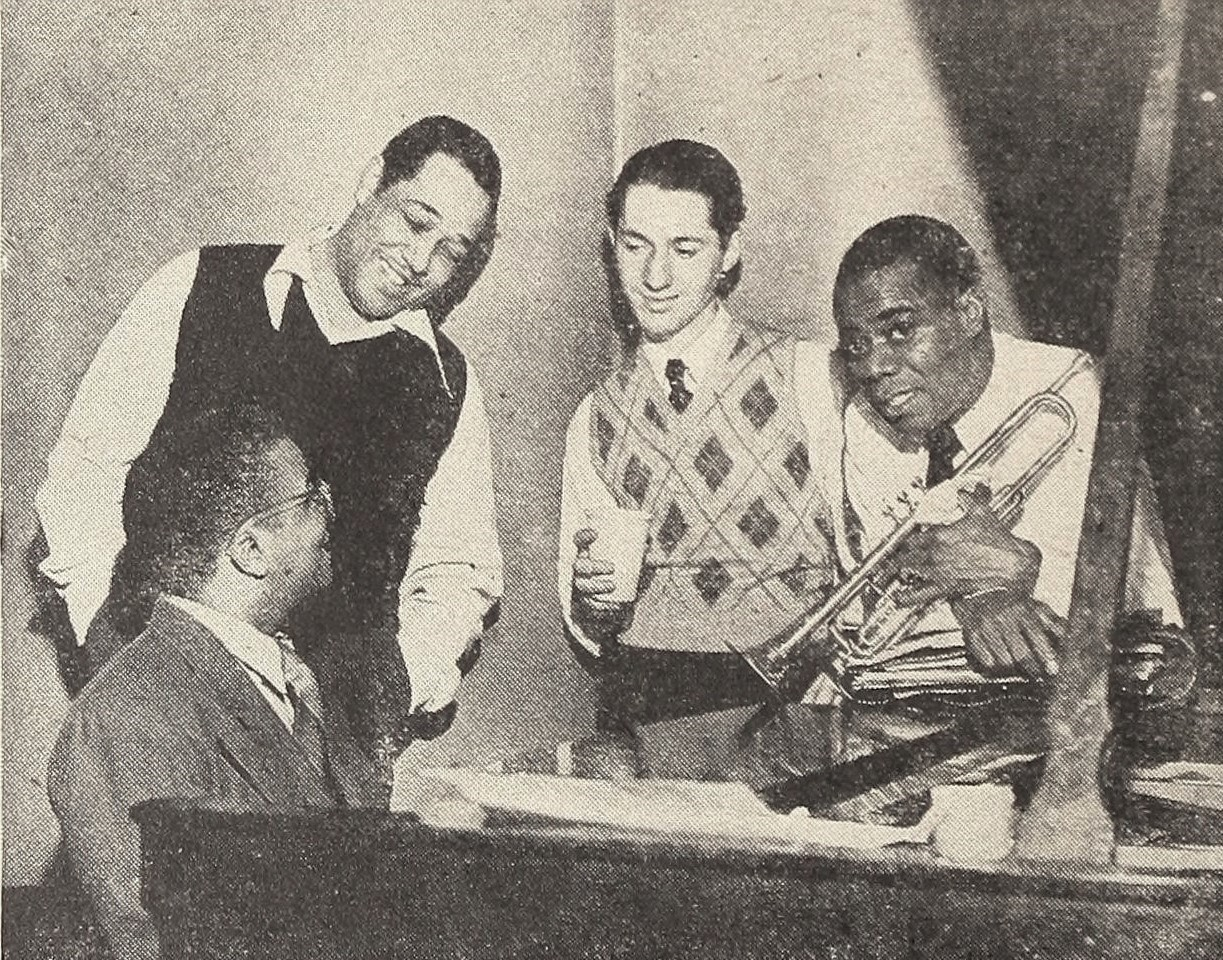
Leonard Feather (third from left), pictured with Billy Strayhorn, Duke Ellington, and Louis Armstrong

The Anglo-American jazz critic and record producer Leonard Feather received a tape recording of Hipp playing, sent to him by an American soldier, and became eager to meet her in person.

In January 1954, during a tour of Germany with the "Jazz Club USA" (featuring Billie Holiday, Buddy DeFranco, and other prominent American jazz musicians), Feather made a detour to Duisburg, where he found Hipp performing with her quintet in a club called the Bohème.

Feather described this first encounter as follows: "As we entered the crowded club in Duisburg, the music floated to our ears and it was hard to believe that it was the work of five Germans. Surrounded by alto and tenor saxophones, bass, and drums, a pretty girl sat at the piano, her auburn hair hanging down her back; she was completely absorbed in the music, apparently oblivious to the noisy crowd around her. All of Jutta's American visitors were unbelievably astonished. To encounter the best European jazz we had yet discovered, played in a country that had been deprived of the sight and sound of real jazz for so many years of Nazism and war, was almost unbelievable."

In April 1954, Feather recorded an album with the Jutta Hipp Quintet in Frankfurt, which was released in the United States in 1956 on the Blue Note Records "New Faces – New Sounds" series under the title New Faces – New Sounds from Germany.

In October 1955, Hipp gave her final concert in Germany at the city hall in Hanover.

== Jazz career in the United States (1955–1956) ==
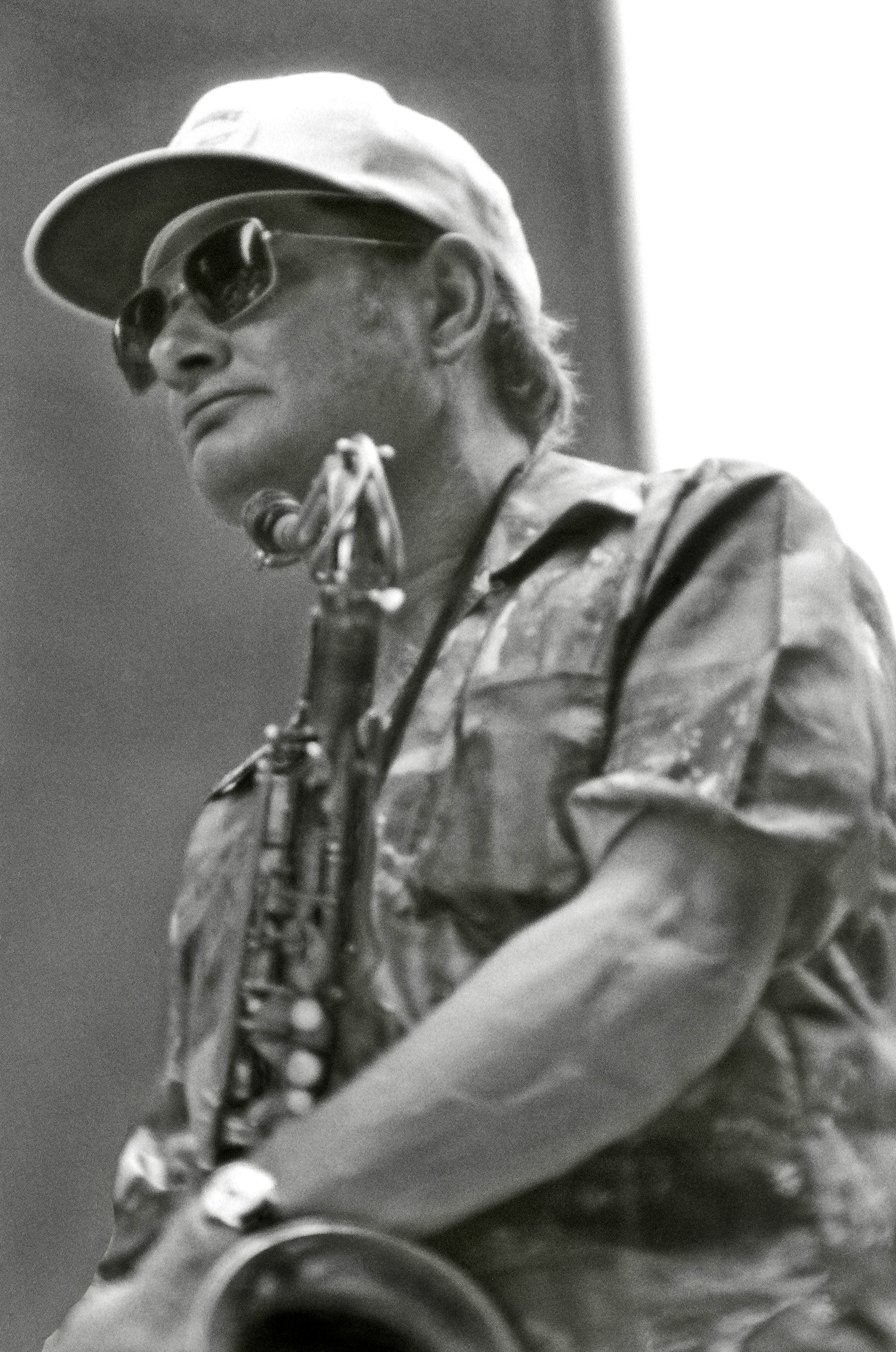
Zoot Sims

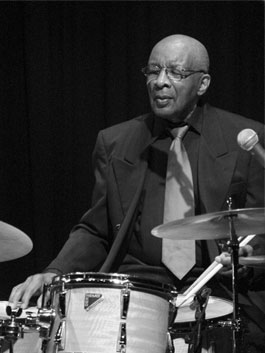
Ed Thigpen

Considering her to be of world-class caliber, Leonard Feather assisted Jutta Hipp with her immigration to the United States in November 1955, after which she settled in New York. Feather promoted her arrival by presenting her in the American media as the "First Lady of European Jazz".

In March 1956, through Feather's arrangements, she was engaged to perform at the Hickory House jazz club in New York, where she played for six months, an unusually long tenure for the venue, which typically booked groups for only one week. She achieved considerable success on the jazz scene of the East Coast, performing for several months with tenor saxophonist Zoot Sims, drummer Ed Thigpen (from the Oscar Peterson Trio), and Paul Motian, who later became the drummer for Bill Evans. Even Duke Ellington and Lennie Tristano came to hear her play.

Through Feather's agency, she secured a recording contract with Blue Note Records, becoming the first European jazz musician and the second white female musician to sign with the label. Three albums were released on the label in 1956: Jutta Hipp with Zoot Sims and two volumes of Jutta Hipp at the Hickory House.

During this period, Hipp was significantly influenced by the hard bop style of Horace Silver, which led her to move away from cool jazz and bebop. She developed a percussive and swinging style similar to that of Silver. She later explained that she had never particularly favored cool jazz but had been guided in that direction first by Hans Koller and subsequently by her associates in Frankfurt, who were oriented toward Lennie Tristano and his quintet with Lee Konitz and Warne Marsh.

She performed at the Newport Jazz Festival in 1956.

=== Break with her manager Leonard Feather (1957) ===
Eight months after her arrival in the United States, Jutta Hipp appeared poised for a long and successful career, but her professional trajectory came to an abrupt halt.

Her professional relationship with Feather ended because she refused, unlike many other musicians, to record his original compositions, a decision that led Feather to sue her for breach of contract. The rift may also have been due to Feather making advances toward her while she was still engaged to Attila Zoller; Hipp herself mentioned such advances to trumpeter Iris Kramer in August 1986.

For Feather, the highly independent Hipp had become persona non grata. He even went so far as to claim that the influence of Horace Silver had ruined her musical style. The break with Feather left Hipp without a manager.

In his later writings and memoirs, Feather referred to his former protégé only in negative terms. For her part, Hipp never again spoke publicly about Feather.

=== Stage fright, alcoholism, and incident with Art Blakey ===
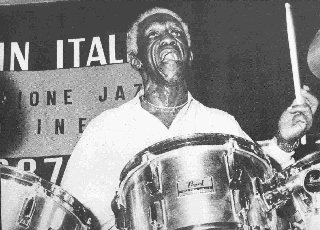
Art Blakey

The combination of stage fright and alcoholism increasingly made it difficult for her to perform. "Hipp was a rather shy individual who suffered from severe stage fright throughout her career and drowned her fears with excessive alcohol and life-long chain smoking." She may have regarded playing the piano as a way of making money in difficult post-war circumstances rather than as an artistic vocation.

When Art Blakey asked her to sit in with his group at the Bohemia café in New York, she refused, stating that she was drunk and in any case did not think she was good enough. Blakey dragged her to the piano and began playing at a furious tempo that she was unable to maintain. Blakey then addressed the audience: "Now you see why we don't want these Europeans coming over here and taking our jobs", although apart from Jutta Hipp and Rolf Kühn, there were virtually no German musicians in America at the time.

=== Rhythm and blues tour (1957) ===
Hipp then undertook a tour of the southern United States in 1957 with the rhythm and blues saxophonist Jesse Powell, which was probably her last performance as a pianist. She later described this experience as the most enjoyable of her career, a blessing, and one of the high points of her musical life.

=== Cessation of musical activity (1958) ===
In 1958, the deterioration of her engagement, stage fright, pressure, existential fear, and a severe alcohol problem led her to stop playing the piano.

In addition to the difficulties with Feather and the personal problems mentioned above, another factor may have contributed: many small jazz clubs were forced to close due to the triumphant success of rock and roll.

In the years that followed, she had little contact with the jazz world, aside from a small circle of friends from her European years, including the guitarist Attila Zoller, her former fiancé, and the writer Dan Morgenstern. According to her friends, she never performed again, and her piano remained silent. She never again appeared publicly as a jazz musician. Efforts by the clarinetist Rolf Kühn to arrange a comeback for her were unsuccessful.

As a result of her withdrawal from the music world, Blue Note Records lost track of her whereabouts and was unable to send her royalty payments because it no longer had her address. In 2000, the label located her through the saxophonist Lee Konitz and his wife Gundula; she was living alone in an apartment in Jackson Heights, Queens, without a piano. In 2001, when representatives from the label visited her to deliver a check for $40,000 representing years of sales from her three Blue Note albums, primarily in Europe and Japan, she enthusiastically showed them her graphic artwork but made no mention of music.

== Return to graphic arts and employment as a seamstress (1958–2003) ==
As it became more difficult to earn enough money as a jazz musician, Hipp may have decided to take a more stable job. She worked in a clothing factory, continued to play on weekends, but started working for Wallachs clothing company in 1960, where she stayed for 35 years. Some reports stated that she was a seamstress, but a later account indicates that she "prepare[d] frayed or torn men's pants for alterations". Feather may have desired a romantic involvement with Hipp and been rejected, but this is unlikely to have been the reason for the rapid decline of her musical career. After abandoning music, Jutta Hipp returned to drawing, photography, and painting and settled in the borough of Queens, working for 35 years as a seamstress at Wallach's Clothiers, until the company dissolved in 1995 and she retired at the age of 70.

Hipp also returned to her first interest of painting. In 1995, the "German magazine Jazz Podium reproduced her painted caricatures of some jazz musicians; Hipp commented that, "With painting, they look at the work, not you".

In his 2012 book Jutta Hipp. Ihr Leben & Wirken. Malerin – Pianistin – Poetin. Eine Dokumentation, Gerhard Evertz documents 65 watercolors in the chapter "Paintings", consisting of landscapes, village and city scenes, and figures; however, only one, entitled "The Pianist", is directly related to music.

Another chapter of the book documents Hipp's activities as a photographer: "There are views from the window of her apartment, friends in a restaurant, musicians at outdoor concerts, the house of Charlie Parker, the grave of Louis Armstrong, but also landscapes that appear to be motifs for her watercolors."

Hipp also drew portraits of major jazz musicians, including Lester Young, Horace Silver, Art Taylor, Barry Harris, Gerry Mulligan, Nica de Koenigswarter, Thelonious Monk, Ella Fitzgerald, Dizzy Gillespie, Zoot Sims, Lionel Hampton, Lee Konitz, Attila Zoller (her former fiancé), and Hans Koller.

Her caricatures of jazz musicians were published in 1995 in the German magazine Jazz Podium and were reproduced in the book by Gerhard Evertz.

Hipp never returned to Germany and, in 1999, the artist became a naturalized United States citizen.

Hipp cut herself off from the music industry. She suffered from depression and struggled to maintain relationships. Around 1986, she restarted giving interviews. Until 2000, Blue Note did not know where to send her royalty checks. When they eventually found her, they gave her a check for $40,000; the Blue Note representative said she was happy to talk about her art but refused to discuss music. Lee Konitz was one of a few musicians who kept in touch with her until her death.

== Death (2003) ==
Hipp died of pancreatic cancer on April 7, 2003, in her apartment in Sunnyside, Queens. She never married, but was once engaged to Attila Zoller. The New York Times obituary stated that "Hipp has no known survivors", although her son was still alive and living in Germany in 2013.

It was only through her obituary that her neighbors learned she had been a significant musician.

She died without surviving descendants, and her ashes were scattered in the Long Island Sound in accordance with her wishes.

== Legacy ==
After her death, Hipp became of some interest as a female instrumentalist in the New York jazz scene.

In 2011, a street in Leipzig was named after Hipp – Jutta-Hipp-Weg.

== Tributes ==
- Since 2011, there has been a street named after Jutta Hipp in Leipzig (Jutta-Hipp-Weg), at the initiative of jazz historian Katja von Schuttenbach, who has long been interested in the artist's life.
- In 2012, the Berlin Jazz Festival opened with a tribute entitled "Remembering Jutta Hipp".
- In 2013, the Ilona Haberkamp Quartet released Cool Is Hipp Is Cool: A Tribute To Jutta Hipp, marking the tenth anniversary of her death.

== Discography ==
=== As leader/co-leader ===
Recording date	Title	Label	Year released	Personnel/Notes
1952-11, 1955-06	The German Recordings 1952–1955	Jazz Haus	2012	Live recordings: trio with Franz "Shorty" Roeder (bass), Karl Sanner (drums); some tracks quartet, with Hans Koller (tenor sax) added; some tracks quintet, with Albert Mangelsdorff (trombone) added, Rudi Sehring (drums) replaces Sanner on some; some tracks quintet, with Joki Freund (tenor sax), Attila Zoller (guitar), Harry Schell (bass), Sanner (drums)
1953 – 1954	Leonard Feather Presents Cool Europe	MGM	1955	Split album with Mike Nevard's British Jazzmen in B-side: In A-side with Emil Mangelsdorff (alto sax), Joki Freund (tenor sax), Hans Koller (tenor sax), Albert Mangelsdorff (Trombone), Hans Kresse (bass), Karl Sanner (drums)
1954-04	New Faces – New Sounds from Germany	Blue Note	1954	Studio recordings: trio with Hans Kresse (bass), Karl Sanner (drums); some tracks quartet, with Jaki Freund (tenor sax) or Emil Mangelsdorff (alto sax) added; some tracks quintet; released as 10-inch LP
1954-04, 1954-06, 1954-07	The Legendary Jutta Hipp Quintet: Frankfurt Special - 1954	Fresh Sound	2006	Compilation of a couple of German recordings of Jutta Hipp from 1954: Emil Mangelsdorff (Alto Sax), Joki Freund (Tenor Sax), Hans Kresse (bass), Karl Sanner (drums)
1955-01	Jutta Hipp with Lars Gullin	Karusell	1955	Quartet, with Lars Gullin (baritone sax), Simon Brehm (bass), Bosse Stoor (drums); EP; reissued as part of the Gullin CD 1954/55 Vol 3 Late Summer (Dragon)
1956-04	At the Hickory House Volume 1& Volume 2	Blue Note	1956	Live trio recording, with Peter Ind (bass), Ed Thigpen (drums)
1956-07	Jutta Hipp with Zoot Sims	Blue Note	1957	Quintet, with Zoot Sims (tenor sax), Jerry Lloyd (trumpet), Ahmed Abdul-Malik (bass), Ed Thigpen (drums)

- 1956: New Faces – New Sounds from Germany (Blue Note BLP 5056; recorded in 1954 in Germany)
- 1955: Jutta Hipp with Lars Gullin (Karusell)
- 1956: Jutta Hipp at the Hickory House Volume 1 (Blue Note 1515), with Peter Ind (double bass) and Ed Thigpen (drums)
- 1956: Jutta Hipp at the Hickory House Volume 2 (Blue Note 1516), with Peter Ind (double bass) and Ed Thigpen (drums)
- 1956: Jutta Hipp with Zoot Sims (Blue Note 93178), with Zoot Sims (saxophone), Jerry Lloyd (trumpet), Ahmed Abdul-Malik (double bass), and Ed Thigpen (drums)
- 2012: The German Recordings 1952–1955 (Jazzhaus/Arthaus Musik/SWR), comprising recordings from German radio archives made between 1952 and 1955 in Baden-Baden, Stuttgart, and Koblenz, with Jutta Hipp (piano), Franz "Shorty" Roeder (double bass), Hans Koller (tenor saxophone), Albert Mangelsdorff (trombone), Rudi Sehring (drums), Joki Freund (tenor saxophone), Attila Zoller (guitar), and Harry Schell (double bass)

=== Biographical set ===
- Hipp Is Cool: The Life And Art Of Jutta Hipp (BE! Jazz, 2015)[6CD + DVD-Video] – on Hipp's music and life

== Bibliography ==
- Evertz, Gerhard (2012). Jutta Hipp. Ihr Leben & Wirken. Malerin – Pianistin – Poetin. Eine Dokumentation [Jutta Hipp. Her Life and Work. Painter – Pianist – Poet. A Documentation] (in German). Hanover: Self-published.
