= Oscar Peterson Plays the George Gershwin Songbook =

Studio album by Oscar Peterson
- Released: 1959
- Recorded: July 14 – August 9, 1959
- Studio: Universal (Chicago)
- Genre: Jazz
- Label: Verve
- Producer: Norman Granz

Oscar Peterson chronology
Oscar Peterson Plays the Duke Ellington Songbook (1959)	Oscar Peterson Plays the George Gershwin Songbook (1959)	Oscar Peterson Plays the Richard Rodgers Songbook (1959)

Professional ratings
Review scores
Source	Rating
Allmusic	3/5 stars
DownBeat	3/5 stars

Oscar Peterson Plays the George Gershwin Songbook is a 1959 album by pianist Oscar Peterson of compositions written by George Gershwin. Peterson had recorded many of the pieces for his 1952 album Oscar Peterson Plays George Gershwin.

== Track listing ==
1. "It Ain't Necessarily So" – 2:48
2. "The Man I Love" – 3:09
3. "Love Walked In" – 2:49
4. "I Was Doing All Right" – 2:50
5. "A Foggy Day" – 2:55
6. "Oh, Lady be Good!" – 3:02
7. "Our Love is Here to Stay" – 2:59
8. "They All Laughed" – 2:31
9. "Let's Call the Whole Thing Off" – 2:20
10. "Summertime" (DuBose Heyward) – 2:58
11. "Nice Work If You Can Get It" – 2:07
12. "Shall We Dance?" – 2:18

All music composed by George Gershwin, with all lyrics by Ira Gershwin. Other lyricists indicated.

== Personnel ==
=== Performance ===
- Oscar Peterson – piano
- Ray Brown – double bass
- Ed Thigpen – drums
