= Oscar Peterson Plays the Richard Rodgers Songbook =

Studio album by Oscar Peterson
- Released: 1959
- Recorded: 1952, 1953, 1959
- Genre: Jazz
- Label: Verve
- Producer: Norman Granz

Oscar Peterson chronology
| Oscar Peterson Plays the George Gershwin Songbook (1959) | Oscar Peterson Plays the Richard Rodgers Songbook (1959) | Oscar Peterson Plays the Jerome Kern Songbook (1959) |

Professional ratings
Review scores
| Source | Rating |
|---|---|
| Allmusic | 3/5 stars |
| DownBeat | 3.5/5 stars |

Oscar Peterson Plays the Richard Rodgers Songbook is a 1959 studio album by pianist Oscar Peterson of compositions written by Richard Rodgers.

== Track listing ==
1. "This Can't Be Love"
2. "It Might as Well Be Spring" (Oscar Hammerstein II)
3. "Johnny One Note"
4. "The Surrey with the Fringe on Top" (Hammerstein)
5. "The Lady Is a Tramp"
6. "Blue Moon"
7. "Manhattan"
8. "Isn't It Romantic?"
9. "Lover"
10. "I Didn't Know What Time It Was"
11. "Bewitched, Bothered and Bewildered"
12. "My Funny Valentine"

All music by Richard Rodgers and all lyrics by Lorenz Hart. Other lyricists indicated.

== Personnel ==
=== Performance ===
- Oscar Peterson – piano
- Ray Brown - Bass
- Ed Thigpen - Drums
