= The Jazz Soul of Oscar Peterson =

Studio album by Oscar Peterson
- Released: 1959
- Recorded: July 14 – August 9, 1959
- Genre: Jazz
- Length: 32:18
- Label: Verve
- Producer: Norman Granz

Oscar Peterson chronology
A Jazz Portrait of Frank Sinatra (1959)	The Jazz Soul of Oscar Peterson (1959)	Plays the Cole Porter Songbook (1959)

Professional ratings
Review scores
Source	Rating
AllMusic	4.5/5 stars
The Penguin Guide to Jazz Recordings	3.5/4 stars

The Jazz Soul of Oscar Peterson is a 1959 album by the Oscar Peterson Trio, described by AllMusic as "a swinging, straight-ahead affair featuring superb playing throughout."

The 1996 Verve CD reissue of the album (and many subsequent digital releases) includes the 1962 Oscar Peterson Trio album Affinity in its entirety. Alternately, some reissues instead include the entirety of the 1961 album Very Tall.

== Track listing ==
1. "Liza (All the Clouds'll Roll Away)" (George Gershwin, Ira Gershwin, Gus Kahn) – 4:29
2. "Con Alma" (Dizzy Gillespie) – 6:55
3. "Close Your Eyes" (Bernice Petkere) – 5:42
4. "The Maidens of Cadiz" (Léo Delibes) – 7:40
5. "My Heart Stood Still" (Lorenz Hart, Richard Rodgers) – 5:40
6. "Woody'n You" (Gillespie) - 3:50

== Personnel ==
- Oscar Peterson – piano
- Ray Brown – double bass
- Ed Thigpen – drums
