= West Side Story (Oscar Peterson Trio album) =

Studio album by Oscar Peterson Trio
- Released: 1962
- Recorded: January 24–25, 1962
- Studios: Webster Hall; New York City
- Genre: Jazz
- Length: 34:37
- Label: Verve
- Producer: Norman Granz

Oscar Peterson Trio chronology
Very Tall (1962)	West Side Story (1962)	Bursting Out with the All-Star Big Band! (1962)

Professional ratings
Review scores
Source	Rating
AllMusic	3.5/5 stars
DownBeat	5/5 stars
The Penguin Guide to Jazz Recordings	3/4 stars
The Rolling Stone Jazz Record Guide	1/5 stars

West Side Story is a 1962 studio album by Oscar Peterson and his trio. The album features jazz interpretations of seven songs from the film West Side Story.

== Track listing ==
1. "Something's Coming" – 3:57
2. "Somewhere" – 5:38
3. "Jet Song" – 7:49
4. "Tonight" – 4:38
5. "Maria" – 4:55
6. "I Feel Pretty" – 4:30
7. "Reprise" – 3:57

All songs composed by Leonard Bernstein with lyrics by Stephen Sondheim.

== Personnel ==
- Oscar Peterson - piano
- Ray Brown - double bass
- Ed Thigpen - drums
