= Dear Old Stockholm =

Swedish popular song

"Ack Värmeland, du sköna" or "Värmlandsvisan" is a Swedish popular song, best known in the English-speaking world as "Dear Old Stockholm".

== "Ack Värmeland, du sköna" ==
"Ack Värmeland, du sköna"

Song
- Genre: Folk song
- Composer: Traditional
- Lyricists: Anders Fryxell (1795–1881); Fredrik August Dahlgren (1816–1895)

"Ack Värmeland, du sköna"
Sung by Joel Mossberg in a 1916 recording

The Swedish title may be roughly translated as "Oh Värmland, you beautiful" and the song praises the historical province (landskap) Värmland. The lyrics were written by the Värmlandian Anders Fryxell in his 1822 musical Vermlands-Flickan (The Värmlandian Girl), and then expanded by Fredrik August Dahlgren for his 1846 work Värmlänningarna.

The song is sung by the young Nicolai Gedda in the 1952 film Eldfågeln. The song was recorded, in Swedish, by Israeli folk duo Esther & Abi Ofarim for their 1968 LP Up To Date.

== Text ==
Anders Fryxell's version from Vermlands-Flickan (1822)

Ack, Värmeland, du sköna, du härliga land!
Du krona för Svea rikes länder!
Ja, om jag komme mitt i det förlovade land,
till Värmland jag ändå återvänder.
Ja, där vill jag leva, ja, där vill jag dö.
Om en gång ifrån Värmland jag tager mig en mö,
så vet jag att aldrig jag mig ångrar.

Ja, när du en gång skall bort och gifta dig, min vän,
då skall du till Värmeland fara;
där finnes nog Guds gåvor med flickor kvar igen,
och alla ä’ de präktiga och rara.
Men friar du där, så var munter och glad!
Ty muntra gossar vilja Värmlandsflickorna ha;
de sorgsna – dem ge de på båten.

Och Värmelandsgossen, han är så stolt och glad,
han fruktar för intet uti världen.
När Konungen bjuder, då drager han åstad,
bland kulor och blixtrande svärden.
Ja! Vore det Ryssar till tusendetal,
han ej dem alla fruktar, han vill ej annat val,
än dö eller segra med ära.

Och skulle han ej strida med glädje och med mod,
och livet sitt våga, det unga?
Där hemma sitter moder och beder för hans blod,
med Bruden, den älskade, unga,
en Värmelandsflicka, så huld och så skön!
För Kung och Land han strider, och hon skall bli hans lön,
Ho kan honom då övervinna?

F. A. Dahlgren's version from Värmlänningarna (1846)

I Värmeland är lustigt att leva och bo;
det landet jag prisar så gärna.
Där klappar det hjärtan med heder och tro
så fasta som bergenas kärna.
Och var och en svensk uti Svea rikes land,
som kommer att gästa vid Klarälvens strand,
han finner blott bröder och systrar.

I Värmeland – ja där vill jag bygga och bo,
med enklaste lycka förnöjder.
Dess dalar och skog ge mig tystnadens ro,
och luften är frisk på dess höjder.
Och forsarna sjunga sin ljuvliga sång –
vid den vill jag somna så stilla en gång
och vila i värmländska jorden.

== "Dear Old Stockholm" ==
The song is best known in the English-speaking world for versions by jazz artists such as Stan Getz (in 1951), Miles Davis (in 1952 for Blue Note Records and 1956 for the album 'Round About Midnight), Jutta Hipp on her album At the Hickory House (in 1956), Paul Chambers (in 1957), John Coltrane (in 1963), and by metal band In Flames (in 2004).
