= Jutta Hipp with Zoot Sims =

Studio album by Jutta Hipp
- Released: February 1957
- Recorded: July 28, 1956
- Studio: Van Gelder (Hackensack, New Jersey)
- Genre: Jazz
- Length: 54:17
- Labels: Blue Note; BLP 1530
- Producer: Alfred Lion

Jutta Hipp chronology
At the Hickory House (1956)	Jutta Hipp with Zoot Sims (1957)

Jutta Hipp with Zoot Sims is a studio album by the German jazz pianist Jutta Hipp. Recorded on July 28, 1956, it was released by Blue Note the following year.

== Background ==
In the liner notes, jazz critic Leonard Feather comments that the album has a relaxed feel, similar to what the listener might experience at a live performance, "... if you happened to drop in one night at Basin Street or the bohemia and found Jutta Hipp sitting in with Zoot's combo."

== Reception ==
The AllMusic review by Scott Yanow and Thom Jurek states, "as a whole, this recording is so wonderfully executed, one has to wonder why Hipp simply dropped out of the jazz world."

Professional ratings
Review scores
Source	Rating
AllMusic	4.5/5 stars
The Penguin Guide to Jazz Recordings	3.5/4 stars

== Track listing ==
Side 1
No.	Title	Writer(s)	Length
1.	"Just Blues"	Zoot Sims	8:42
2.	"Violets for Your Furs"	Matt Dennis; Tom Adair	6:10
3.	"Down Home"	Jerry Lloyd	6:43

Side 2
No.	Title	Writer(s)	Length
1.	"Almost Like Being in Love"	Alan Jay Lerner; Frederick Loewe	6:16
2.	"Wee Dot"	J. J. Johnson; Leo Parker	7:28
3.	"Too Close for Comfort"	Jerry Bock; George David Weiss; Larry Holofcener	6:52

CD reissue bonus tracks
No.	Title	Writer(s)	Length
7.	"These Foolish Things"	Harry Link; Holt Marvell; Jack Strachey	6:12
8.	"'S Wonderful"	George Gershwin; Ira Gershwin	5:54

== Personnel ==
=== Musicians ===
- Jutta Hipp – piano
- Zoot Sims – tenor saxophone
- Jerry Lloyd – trumpet
- Ahmed Abdul-Malik – bass
- Ed Thigpen – drums

=== Technical personnel ===
- Alfred Lion – producer
- Rudy Van Gelder – recording engineer
- Reid Miles – design
- Leonard Feather – liner notes
