= Affinity (Oscar Peterson album) =

Studio album by the Oscar Peterson Trio
- Released: 1962
- Recorded: September 25–27, 1962, Chicago, Illinois
- Genre: Jazz
- Label: Verve
- Producer: Norman Granz

The Oscar Peterson Trio chronology
Bursting Out with the All-Star Big Band! (1962)	Affinity (1962)	Night Train (1963)

Professional ratings
Review scores
Source	Rating
AllMusic	3/5 stars

Affinity is a 1962 studio album by the Oscar Peterson Trio.

The album is included in its entirety on the 1996 CD reissue (and many subsequent digital releases) of the 1959 Oscar Peterson Trio album The Jazz Soul of Oscar Peterson.

== Track listing ==
1. "Waltz for Debby" (Bill Evans, Gene Lees) – 5:53
2. "Tangerine" (Johnny Mercer, Victor Schertzinger) – 4:41
3. "Gravy Waltz" (Steve Allen, Ray Brown) – 4:26
4. "This Could Be the Start of Something" (Allen) – 4:43
5. "Baubles, Bangles, & Beads" (George Forrest, Robert Wright) – 4:13
6. "Six and Four" (Oliver Nelson) – 7:03
7. "I'm a Fool to Want You" (Joel Herron, Frank Sinatra, Jack Wolf) – 3:44
8. "Yours Is My Heart Alone" (Ludwig Herzer, Franz Lehár, Fritz Löhner-Beda) – 5:38

== Personnel ==
- Oscar Peterson – piano
- Ray Brown – double bass
- Ed Thigpen – drums
