= Oscar Peterson Plays the Harold Arlen Songbook =

Plays the Harold Arlen Songbook

Studio album by Oscar Peterson
- Released: May 1960
- Recorded: July 14–August 9, 1959
- Studio: Universal Recorders, Chicago, IL
- Genre: Jazz
- Label: Verve
- Producer: Norman Granz

Oscar Peterson chronology
| Plays the Jerome Kern Songbook (1960) | Plays the Harold Arlen Songbook (1960) | Swinging Brass with the Oscar Peterson Trio (1960) |

Professional ratings
Review scores
| Source | Rating |
|---|---|
| Allmusic | 3/5 stars |
| The Penguin Guide to Jazz Recordings | 3.5/4 stars |

Oscar Peterson Plays the Harold Arlen Songbook is an album by Canadian jazz pianist Oscar Peterson, which was recorded in 1959. It was reissued in 2001 combined with the 1954 recording Oscar Peterson Plays Harold Arlen.

== Track listing ==
Original 1959 track listing.

1. "As Long as I Live" (Harold Arlen, Ted Koehler)
2. "Come Rain or Come Shine" (Arlen, Johnny Mercer)
3. "Ac-Cent-Tchu-Ate the Positive" (Arlen, Mercer)
4. "Between the Devil and the Deep Blue Sea" (Arlen, Koehler)
5. "I've Got the World on a String" (Arlen, Koehler)
6. "That Old Black Magic" (Arlen, Mercer)
7. "Let's Fall in Love" (Arlen, Koehler)
8. "Stormy Weather" (Arlen, Koehler)
9. "Over the Rainbow" (Arlen, E. Y. Harburg)
10. "Happiness is a Thing Called Joe" (Arlen, Harburg)
11. "The Man that Got Away" (Arlen, Ira Gershwin)
12. "Ill Wind" (Arlen, Koehler)

2001 Reissue track listing:

1. "As Long as I Live" (Arlen, Koehler)
2. "I Gotta Right to Sing the Blues" (Arlen, Koehler)
3. "Come Rain or Come Shine" (Arlen, Mercer)
4. "Ac-Cent-Tchu-Ate the Positive" (Arlen, Mercer)
5. "Between the Devil and the Deep Blue Sea" (Arlen, Koehler)
6. "I've Got the World on a String" (Arlen, Koehler)
7. "It's Only a Paper Moon" (Arlen, Harburg, Billy Rose)
8. "That Old Black Magic" (Arlen, Mercer)
9. "Let's Fall in Love" (Arlen, Koehler)
10. "Stormy Weather" (Arlen, Koehler)
11. "Blues in the Night" (Arlen, Mercer)
12. "Over the Rainbow" (Arlen, Harburg)
13. "Happiness is a Thing Called Joe" (Arlen, Harburg)
14. "Stormy Weather" (Arlen, Koehler)
15. "Over the Rainbow" (Arlen, Harburg)
16. "The Man that Got Away" (Arlen, I. Gershwin)
17. "Ill Wind" (Arlen, Koehler)
18. "Let's Fall in Love" (Arlen, Koehler)
19. "As Long as I Live" (Arlen, Koehler)
20. "Come Rain or Come Shine" (Arlen, Mercer)
21. "Ac-Cent-Tchu-Ate the Positive" (Arlen, Mercer)
22. "Between the Devil and the Deep Blue Sea" (Arlen, Koehler)
23. "I've Got the World on a String" (Arlen, Koehler)
24. "That Old Black Magic" (Arlen, Mercer)

== Personnel ==
- Oscar Peterson – piano
- Ray Brown – double bass
- Ed Thigpen – drums
- Herb Ellis – guitar (on titles taken from Oscar Peterson Plays Harold Arlen)
