= Toshiko's Piano =

Studio album by Toshiko Akiyoshi
- Released: 1954
- Recorded: 13, 14 November 1953
- Venue: Tokyo, Japan
- Studio: Radio Tokyo Studio 2
- Genre: Jazz
- Length: 23:51
- Label: Norgran
- Producer: Norman Granz

Toshiko Akiyoshi chronology
Toshiko's Piano (1954)	Toshiko at Mocambo (1954)

Alternative cover / title
- Amazing Toshiko Akiyoshi

Professional ratings
Review scores
Source	Rating
AllMusic	3/5 stars

Toshiko's Piano (released as Amazing Toshiko Akiyoshi in Japan) is the debut recording of jazz pianist Toshiko Akiyoshi. It was recorded in Japan in 1953 with guitarist Herb Ellis, bassist Ray Brown and drummer J.C. Heard, who were known at the time for their work as pianist Oscar Peterson's rhythm section for Jazz at the Philharmonic concerts. The album was released as a 10-inch LP album on Norman Granz's Norgran Record label. Later 12 inch LP and (Japanese) CD re-issues also include all 4 Akiyoshi tracks from 1957's Verve Records recording, Toshiko and Leon Sash at Newport. The cover artwork is by David Stone Martin.

== Track listing ==
LP side A

1. "What Is This Thing Called Love?" (Porter) – 2:45
2. "Gone with the Wind" (Wrubel, Magidson) – 2:33
3. "I Want to Be Happy" (Youmans, Caesar) – 2:14
4. "Toshiko's Blues" (Akiyoshi) – 3:44

LP side B

1. "Shadrach" (MacGimsey) – 2:41
2. "Solidado" (Akiyoshi) – 3:29
3. "Squatty Roo" (Hodges) – 2:38
4. "Laura" (Raksin, Mercer) – 3:27

Additional four bonus tracks on later 12 inch LP and CD re-issues (from 1957 live recording, Toshiko...at Newport):

9. "Between Me and Myself" (Akiyoshi) – 5:38
10. "Blues for Toshiko" (Akiyoshi) – 5:38
11. "I'll Remember April" (Raye, DePaul, Johnston) – 7:05
12. "Lover" (Rodgers, Hart) – 5:45

== Personnel ==
Tracks 1~8 (A1~B4 of original 10 inch LP)

- Toshiko Akiyoshi – piano
- Herb Ellis – guitar
- Ray Brown – bass
- J. C. Heard – drums

Tracks 9~12

- Toshiko Akiyoshi – piano
- Gene Cherico – bass
- Jake Hanna – drums
