= Out of the Storm (Ed Thigpen album) =

Studio album by Ed Thigpen
- Released: 1966
- Recorded: April 18, 19 & 20, 1966; Van Gelder Studio, Englewood Cliffs
- Genre: Jazz
- Length: 31:49
- Label: Verve; V6-8663
- Producer: Creed Taylor

Ed Thigpen chronology
Out of the Storm (1966)	Action-Re-Action (1974)

Out of the Storm is the debut album led by American drummer Ed Thigpen recorded in 1966 for the Verve label.

== Reception ==
Professional ratings
Review scores
Source	Rating
Allmusic	4/5 stars

The Allmusic review by Scott Yanow awarded the album 4 stars stating "Unfortunately, there are only 32 minutes of music on this CD (which is highlighted by "Cielito Lindo"), so its brevity keeps it from being too essential, but the performances are enjoyable".

== Track listing ==
All compositions by Ed Thigpen except as indicated

1. "Cielito Lindo" (C. Fernandez) - 4:41
2. "Cloud Break (Up Blues)" - 1:14
3. "Out of the Storm" - 7:27
4. "Theme from "Harper"" (Johnny Mandel) - 2:36
5. "Elbow and Mouth" (Kenny Burrell) - 6:14
6. "Heritage" - 5:15
7. "Struttin' With Some Barbecue" (Lil Hardin Armstrong, Don Raye) - 4:22
- Recorded at Van Gelder Studio, Englewood Cliffs, NJ on April 18 (tracks 3 & 4), April 19 (tracks 1, 6 & 7), and April 20 (tracks 2 & 5), 1966

== Personnel ==
- Ed Thigpen - drums, voice on "Heritage"
- Clark Terry - trumpet, flugelhorn, voice on "Heritage"
- Herbie Hancock - piano
- Kenny Burrell - guitar
- Ron Carter - bass
