= Leon Sash =

American jazz accordionist (1922–1979)

- Born: Leon Robert Sash; October 19, 1922
- Died: November 25, 1979 (aged 57)
- Genres: Jazz
- Occupation: Instrumentalist
- Instrument: Accordion

Leon Robert Sash (October 19, 1922 – November 25, 1979), was an American jazz accordionist.

== Career ==
Sash was blind from the age of 11. He studied harmony with Lew Klatt, arranging with Mac Gerrard, and made his professional debut at the age of 16. He made a novel series of recordings for EmArcy in 1954 using voices in place of brass and reed sections. Sash was the first jazz accordionist requested to perform at the Newport Jazz Festival, in 1957. This performance was released by Verve in 1957. His career spanned almost four decades of international fame and recognition. His accomplishments included composing, arranging, acting as a staff musician at WLS radio in Chicago, TV guest appearances, concerts, and club dates at some of the top jazz rooms in the US. In the International Musician, Leonard Feather named him one of the "Giants of Jazz".

During his career, Sash recorded for EmArcy, Verve, Storyville, Columbia, and Delmark. His jazz quartet featured reed man Ted Robinson and Leon's wife Lee on bass and vocals. The quartet shared billings with jazz greats Zoot Sims, Mulligan, Shearing, Garner, and Brubeck at top jazz clubs such as Storyville in Boston, the Café Bohemia in New York, and Chicago's famous Blue Note. In the 1960s, Jerry Cigler and Jerry Brown joined Leon and Lee in a big band sound using three uniquely voiced accordions, two of which had larger reeds. The bass accordion played by Brown was comparable to a trombone section, and Cigler's tenor accordion was voiced like a reed section, Leon played the brass section and Lee sang the top trumpet part. Sash's folios, volumes 1 and 2 of Sash 'N' Jazz and Rockin' Blues, published by O. Pagani Music in New York City, have been sought after by many musicians because of the written jazz improvisation and proper accents as played by Leon – truly a great help in seeing how jazz should be played. In later years, Leon and Lee, with drummer Ed Uhlig and jazz violinist Eddie Vanna, played club dates in the Chicago area. The quartet also had the honor of being invited by President Carter to play one of the Inaugural Balls in 1977 and performed before 20,000 people at the National Visitors' Center in Washington D.C.

Leon Sash died on November 25, 1979, from a heart condition. At his funeral Mass, Jerry Cigler performed the Jerome Kern standard "All the Things You Are" in the rubato style made famous by Leon. After Sash's death, his wife Lee continued the Leon Sash Quartet with jazz accordionist Bob Gray, one of Leon's proteges. She also worked hard to preserve the memory of Leon by re-issuing his recordings on LP and cassette tape, through Sounds of Sash, Ltd.

== Discography ==
- Leon the Lion/Package For Peggy (EmArcy 16033 78 rpm, and EmArcy 16003x45 45 rpm)
- Swing Brother Swing/Minoring for Gold (EmArcy 16012 78 rpm, and EmArcy 116012,45 45 rpm) (1954)
- This Is The Jazz Accordion (Storyville 1956)
- Toshiko and Leon Sash at Newport (Verve 1957)
- Hi-Fi Holiday for Accordion: The Twin Accordions of Leon Sash (Columbia 1962)
- The Leon Sash Quintet Plays Big Band Jazz (with Jerry Cigler) (Super Recording Studios 1962 -re-released on cassette by Sounds of Sash, Ltd. QV-2345 in 1990)
- I Remember Newport (Delmark DL-416, Stereo DS-9416 1967, DD-416 1997)
- Leon Sash - The Master, with Lee Morgan and the Meadowlarks (Collection of both EmArcy 78s and other unreleased tracks from the 1950s, re-released by Polygram Records and Sounds of Sash Ltd. in 1983)

== Other works ==
- Sash 'n' Jazz (2 volume music books by Leon Sash, No. 8073 and 8074 Copyright 1958 by O. Pagani, available from Ernest Deffner Publications)
- Rockin' Blues for the Accordion (Music book by Leon Sash and Lee Morgan, No. 8109 Copyright 1963 by O. Pagani, available from Erest Deffner Publications)
