= Oscar Peterson Plays the Cole Porter Songbook =

Plays the Cole Porter Songbook

Studio album by Oscar Peterson
- Released: December 1959
- Recorded: July 14 – August 9, 1959
- Studio: Universal (Chicago)
- Genre: Jazz
- Length: 32:18
- Label: Verve
- Producer: Norman Granz

Oscar Peterson chronology
The Jazz Soul of Oscar Peterson (1959)	Plays the Cole Porter Songbook (1959)	Plays the Harry Warren Songbook (1959)

Professional ratings
Review scores
Source	Rating
AllMusic	4.5/5 stars
DownBeat	3/5 stars
The Encyclopedia of Popular Music	5/5 stars
The Penguin Guide to Jazz Recordings	3/4 stars

Oscar Peterson Plays the Cole Porter Songbook is a 1959 album by Oscar Peterson, of compositions by Cole Porter.

== Track listing ==
1. "In the Still of the Night" – 2:49
2. "It's All Right With Me" – 2:51
3. "Love for Sale" – 3:26
4. "Just One of Those Things" – 2:21
5. "I've Got You Under My Skin" – 2:47
6. "Ev'ry Time We Say Goodbye" – 2:17
7. "Night and Day" – 2:30
8. "You'd Be So Easy to Love" – 2:34
9. "Why Can't You Behave?" – 2:58
10. "I Love Paris" – 2:09
11. "I Concentrate on You" – 3:08
12. "It's De-Lovely" – 2:28

All music written by Cole Porter.

== Personnel ==
- Ray Brown - double bass
- Oscar Peterson - piano
- Ed Thigpen - drums
