= Joki Freund =

German jazz saxophonist (1926–2012)

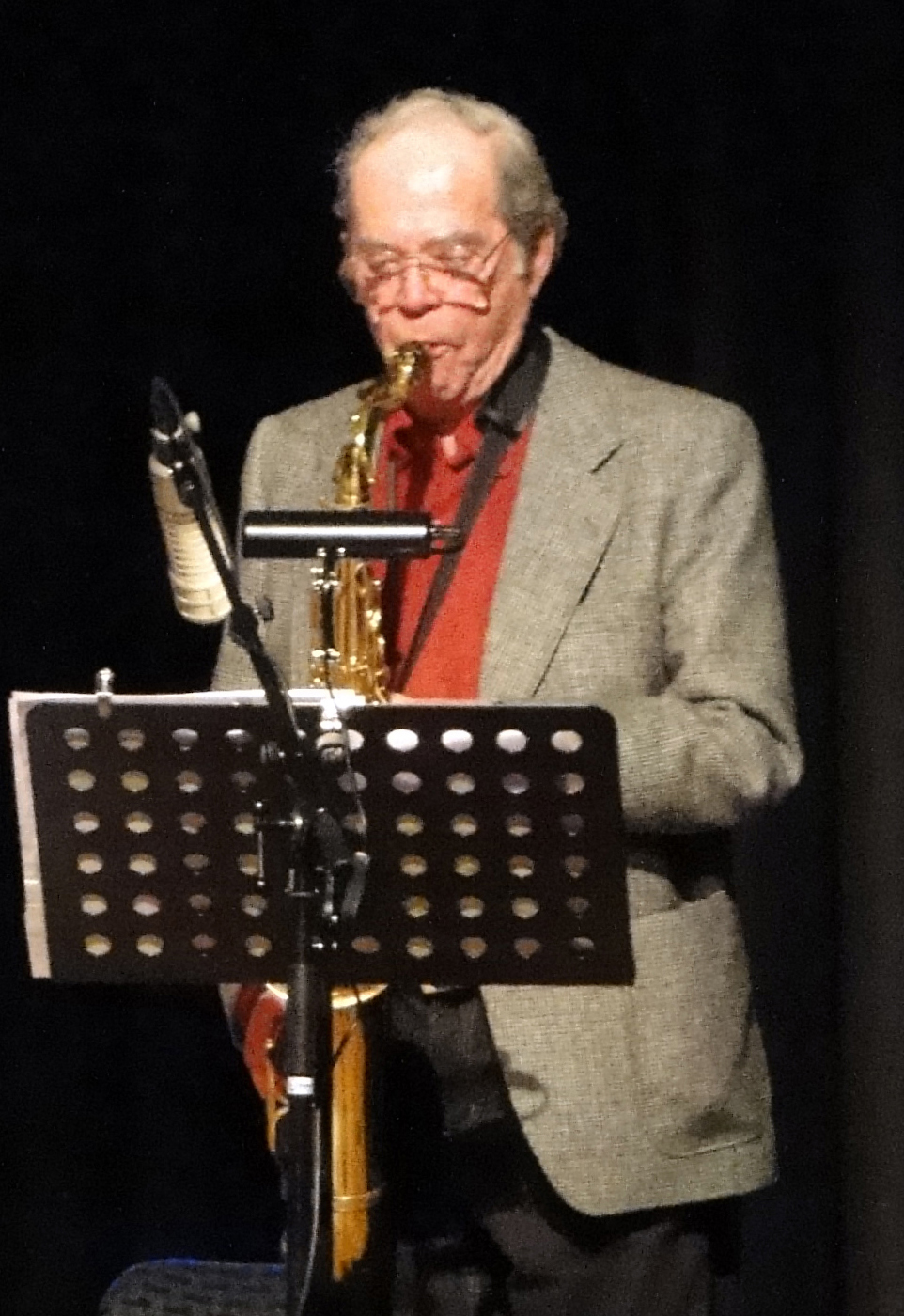
Joki Freund as a member of the All Star Band, at the Hofheimer Jazz Festival 2009

Walter Jakob "Joki" Freund (September 5, 1926, Höchst, Frankfurt am Main – February 15, 2012, Schwalbach am Taunus) was a German jazz saxophonist.

Freund began playing the accordion as a child, switching to tenor saxophone after World War II ended. Early in the postwar era, he played with Joe Quitter, Carlo Bohländer, Gerry Weinkopf, Joe Klimm, and Jutta Hipp, then formed his own ensemble. He began performing with American musicians, including Donald Byrd, Art Taylor, and Doug Watkins, during their European festival appearances. He played with, and arranged for, Albert Mangelsdorff in the jazz orchestra of Hessischer Rundfunk and Erwin Lehn in the Süddeutscher Rundfunk orchestra. He played with the Frankfurt Jazz Ensemble on soprano saxophone in the 1970s, also performing as a leader around this time.
