= Toshiko and Leon Sash at Newport =

Live album by Toshiko Akiyoshi and Leon Sash
- Released: 1957
- Recorded: 5 July 1957
- Venue: Newport Jazz Festival
- Genre: Jazz
- Label: Verve

Leon Sash chronology
This is the Jazz Accordion (1956)	Toshiko and Leon Sash at Newport (1957)	Hi-Fi Holiday for Accordion:... (1959)

Toshiko Akiyoshi chronology
Toshiko – Her Trio, Her Quartet (1956)	Toshiko and Leon Sash at Newport (1957)	The Many Sides of Toshiko (1957)

Professional ratings
Review scores
Source	Rating
AllMusic	4/5 stars
Disc	3/5 stars

Toshiko and Leon Sash at Newport is a live album recorded at the Newport Jazz Festival in 1957 and released on the Verve record label. All 4 Toshiko Akiyoshi tracks are also included on some later re-issues of the Norgran (Verve) recording Toshiko's Piano / Amazing Toshiko Akiyoshi.

== Track listing ==
LP side A (Toshiko Akiyoshi Trio set):

1. "Between Me and Myself" (Akiyoshi)
2. "Blues for Toshiko" (Akiyoshi)
3. "I'll Remember April" (Raye, DePaul, Johnston)
4. "Lover" (Rodgers, Hart)

LP side B (Leon Sash Quartet set):

1. "Sash-Kebob" (Sash, Morgan)
2. "Meant for Brent" (Sash, Robinson)
3. "Carnegie Horizons" (Shearing)
4. "Blue Lou" (Mills, Sampson)

== Personnel ==
Side A:

- Toshiko Akiyoshi – piano
- Gene Cherico – bass
- Jake Hanna – drums

Side B:

- Leon Sash – accordion
- Ted Robinson – tenor saxophone, clarinet
- Lee Morgan – bass
- Roger Price – drums
