= Primitive Modern =

Studio album by Gil Mellé
- Released: 1957
- Recorded: April 20 and June 1, 1956; Van Gelder Studio, Hackensack, New Jersey
- Genre: Jazz
- Label: Prestige; PRLP 7040
- Producer: Bob Weinstock

Gil Mellé chronology
Patterns in Jazz (1956)	Primitive Modern (1957)	Gil's Guests (1956)

Primitive Modern is an album by saxophonist and composer Gil Mellé recorded in 1956 and released on the Prestige label.

== Reception ==
Professional ratings
Review scores
Source	Rating
Allmusic	2/5 stars

Allmusic awarded the album 2 stars.

== Track listing ==
All compositions by Gil Mellé

1. "Dominica" – 5:53
2. "Iron Works" – 3:55
3. "Ballet Time" – 6:44
4. "Adventure Swing" – 5:59
5. "Dedicatory Piece to the Geo-Physical Year of 1957" – 4:41
6. "Mark One" – 4:47

== Personnel ==
- Gil Mellé – baritone saxophone, alto saxophone
- Joe Cinderella – guitar
- Billy Phipps – bass
- Ed Thigpen – drums

=== Production ===
- Bob Weinstock – supervisor
- Rudy Van Gelder – engineer
