= The Toshiko Trio =

Studio album by Toshiko Akiyoshi
- Released: 1956
- Recorded: 1956
- Venue: New York City
- Genre: Jazz
- Length: 34:15
- Label: Storyville

Toshiko Akiyoshi chronology
Toshiko at Mocambo (1954)	The Toshiko Trio (1956)	Toshiko – Her Trio, Her Quartet (1956)

Professional ratings
Review scores
Source	Rating
AllMusic	4/5 stars

The Toshiko Trio (a.k.a. George Wein Presents Toshiko) is a jazz record album recorded in 1956 in New York City and released on the Storyville record label. It is the second studio recording of pianist Toshiko Akiyoshi - not to be confused with her 1983 Toshiba East World album, Toshiko Akiyoshi Trio.

== Track listing ==
All compositions by Toshiko Akiyoshi except as noted:

LP side A

1. "Between Me and Myself" – 5:15
2. "It Could Happen to You" (Burke, Van Heusen) – 3:55
3. "Kyōshū" ("Nostalgia") – 3:39
4. "Homework" – 3:38

LP side B

1. "Manhattan Address" – 2:43
2. "Sunday Afternoon" – 4:15
3. "Blues for Toshiko" – 5:10
4. "Soshū No Yoru" (traditional) – 1:35
5. "Softly, as in a Morning Sunrise" (Hammerstein, Romberg) – 4:05

== Personnel ==
- Toshiko Akiyoshi – piano
- Paul Chambers – bass
- Ed Thigpen – drums
