= Statements (album) =

Studio album by Milt Jackson
- Released: 1962
- Recorded: December 14–15, 1961
- Studios: Van Gelder Studio, Englewood Cliffs, NJ
- Genre: Jazz
- Label: Impulse!
- Producers: Bob Thiele, Michael Cuscuna

Milt Jackson chronology
Very Tall (1962)	Statements (1962)	Bags Meets Wes! (1962)

Professional ratings
Review scores
Source	Rating
Down Beat (Original Lp release)	3.5/5 stars
Allmusic	3/5 stars

Statements is an album by jazz vibraphonist Milt Jackson, released in 1962 on Impulse! Records.

The CD reissue adds tracks 9–13 featuring a composition originally on an Impulse sampler as well as quintet recordings from 1964 also released on Jazz 'n' Samba.

== Track listing ==
1. "Statements" (Milt Jackson) – 5:28
2. "Slowly" (Kermit Goell, David Raksin) – 3:02
3. "A Thrill from the Blues" (Jackson) – 5:42
4. "Put Off" (Jackson) – 5:34
5. "Sonnymoon for Two" (Sonny Rollins) – 5:57
6. "Bad and the Beautiful" (Raksin) – 3:07
7. "Paris Blues" (Duke Ellington) – 2:54
8. "Beautiful Romance" (Jackson) – 2:26
9. "Blues for Juanita" (Jackson) – 5:38
10. "I Got It Bad (and That Ain't Good)" (Ellington, Paul Francis Webster) – 2:38
11. "Big George" (Jackson) – 4:43
12. "Gingerbread Boy" (Jimmy Heath) – 3:41
13. "Anything I Do" (Chester Conn, George Douglas) – 2:59

== Personnel ==
- Milt Jackson – vibraphone
- Jimmy Heath – tenor saxophone
- Tommy Flanagan – piano
- Hank Jones – piano
- Paul Chambers – bass
- Connie Kay – drums

== Production ==
- Pete Turner – photography
