= Oscar Peterson Plays Duke Ellington =

Studio album by Oscar Peterson
- Released: 1953
- Recorded: December 1952
- Genre: Jazz
- Label: Clef
- Producer: Norman Granz

Oscar Peterson chronology
The Astaire Story (1952)	Oscar Peterson Plays Duke Ellington (1953)	Oscar Peterson Plays Harold Arlen (1954)

Professional ratings
Review scores
Source	Rating
Allmusic	4.5/5 stars

Oscar Peterson Plays Duke Ellington is an album by Canadian jazz pianist Oscar Peterson, of songs associated with Duke Ellington released in 1953 on Clef Records. Peterson re-recorded much of the music for his 1959 album Oscar Peterson Plays the Duke Ellington Song book.

== Track listing ==
1. "John Hardy's Wife" (M. Ellington) – 3:24
2. "Sophisticated Lady" (Irving Mills, Mitchell Parish) – 3:01
3. "Things Ain't What They Used to Be" (Mercer Ellington, Ted Persons) – 3:16
4. "Just A-Sittin' and A-Rockin'" (Lee Gaines, Billy Strayhorn) – 3:45
5. "In a Mellow Tone" – 3:09
6. "I Got It Bad (and That Ain't Good)" (Paul Francis Webster) – 3:17
7. "Prelude to a Kiss" (Mack Gordon, Mills) – 3:19
8. "Cotton Tail" – 3:53
9. "Don't Get Around Much Anymore" (Russell) – 4:00
10. "Take the "A" Train" (Strayhorn) – 3:19
11. "Rockin' in Rhythm" (Mills) – 2:56
12. "Never No Lament (Do Nothin' Til You Hear from Me)" (Bob Russell) – 3:01

All music composed by Duke Ellington, with the exception of "Take the "A" Train", "Things Ain't What They Used to Be", and "John Hardy's Wife", other composers and lyricists indicated.

== Personnel ==
- Oscar Peterson – piano
- Barney Kessel – guitar
- Ray Brown – double bass
