= At the Hickory House =

- Volume 1

Live album by Jutta Hipp
- Released: June 1956
- Recorded: April 5, 1956
- Genres: Jazz; hard bop
- Length: 87:51
- Label: Blue Note
- Producer: Alfred Lion

Jutta Hipp chronology
Jutta Hipp (1954)	At the Hickory House (1956)	Jutta Hipp with Zoot Sims (1956)

At the Hickory House
- Volume 2

At the Hickory House, Vols. 1 & 2 are a pair of separate but related live albums by the German jazz pianist Jutta Hipp. Recorded on April 5, 1956, they were released by Blue Note that June. Hipp is backed by rhythm section Peter Ind and Ed Thigpen.

== Reception ==
Professional ratings
Review scores
Source	Rating
AllMusic	4/5 stars

The AllMusic review by Stephen Thomas Erlewine states, "At the Hickory House is a thoroughly appealing collection of lightly swinging small-combo jazz that draws equally from hard bop and soul-jazz."

== Track listing ==
=== At the Hickory House, Volume 1 ===
Side 1
No.	Title	Writer(s)	Length
1.	"Take Me in Your Arms"	Fred Markush	4:54
2.	"Dear Old Stockholm"	Traditional	4:44
3.	"Billie's Bounce"	Charlie Parker	4:06
4.	"I'll Remember April"	Gene de Paul; Patricia Johnston; Don Raye	3:52
5.	"Lady Bird"	Tadd Dameron	3:52

Side 2
No.	Title	Writer(s)	Length
1.	"Mad About the Boy"	Noël Coward	3:47
2.	"Ain't Misbehavin'"	Harry Brooks; Andy Razaf; Fats Waller	5:02
3.	"These Foolish Things"	Harry Link; Eric Maschwitz; Jack Strachey	3:59
4.	"Jeepers Creepers"	Johnny Mercer; Harry Warren	8:46
5.	"The Moon Was Yellow"	Fred E. Ahlert; Edgar Leslie	4:54

=== At the Hickory House, Volume 2 ===
Side 1
No.	Title	Writer(s)	Length
1.	"Gone with the Wind"	Herb Magidson; Allie Wrubel	4:50
2.	"After Hours"	Avery Parrish	4:40
3.	"The Squirrel"	Dameron	3:46
4.	"We'll Be Together Again"	Carl Fischer; Frankie Laine	3:15
5.	"Horacio"	Jutta Hipp	3:20

Side 2
No.	Title	Writer(s)	Length
1.	"I Married an Angel"	Lorenz Hart; Richard Rodgers	4:24
2.	"Moonlight in Vermont"	John Blackburn; Karl Suessdorf	3:24
3.	"Star Eyes"	Gene de Paul; Don Raye	4:01
4.	"If I Had You"	Irving King; Ted Shapiro	3:54
5.	"My Heart Stood Still"	Hart; Rogers	4:21

== Personnel ==
=== Musicians ===
- Jutta Hipp – piano
- Peter Ind – bass
- Ed Thigpen – drums

=== Technical personnel ===
- Alfred Lion – producer
- Rudy Van Gelder – recording engineer
- Reid Miles – design
- Francis Wolff – photography
- Leonard Feather – liner notes
