= Buddy DeFranco and Oscar Peterson Play George Gershwin =

Studio album by Buddy DeFranco & Oscar Peterson
- Released: 1955
- Recorded: December 6, 7, 1954, Los Angeles, California
- Genre: Jazz
- Length: 50:31
- Label: Clef
- Producer: Norman Granz

Buddy DeFranco chronology
| Mr. Clarinet (1954) | Buddy DeFranco and Oscar Peterson Play George Gershwin (1954) | In a Mellow Mood (1954) |

Oscar Peterson chronology
| Oscar Peterson Plays Harold Arlen (1954) | Buddy DeFranco and Oscar Peterson Play George Gershwin (1954) | Oscar Peterson Plays Count Basie (1954) |

Professional ratings
Review scores
| Source | Rating |
|---|---|
| AllMusic | 2.5/5 stars |

Buddy DeFranco and Oscar Peterson Play George Gershwin is a 1955 album by Buddy DeFranco, accompanied by the Oscar Peterson trio, of songs composed by George Gershwin. Billboard in 1955 wrote: "The flashy talents of clarinetist DeFranco and pianist Peterson jell neatly here in the well-arranged ork setting. [...] The fact that they play Gershwin isn't important, since both men reduce the material at hand into what has become their personal cliches."

== Track listing ==
1. "I Wants to Stay Here" (DuBose Heyward) – 3:46
2. "I Was Doing All Right" – 5:21
3. "'S Wonderful" – 4:21
4. "Bess, You Is My Woman Now" (Heyward) – 4:54
5. "Strike Up the Band" – 2:26
6. "They Can't Take That Away from Me" – 3:49
7. "The Man I Love" – 4:31
8. "I Got Rhythm" – 3:18
9. "Someone to Watch Over Me" – 4:18
10. "It Ain't Necessarily So" – 4:10
11. "I Wants to Stay Here" – 4:11 Alternate track on CD reissue
12. "Someone to Watch over Me" – 4:35 Alternate track on CD reissue

All songs composed by George Gershwin, with lyrics by Ira Gershwin. Additional lyrics by DuBose Heyward where indicated.

== Personnel ==
=== Performance ===
- Buddy DeFranco – clarinet
- Oscar Peterson – piano
- Ray Brown – double bass
- Herb Ellis – guitar
- Bobby White – drums
