= Gil's Guests =

Studio album by Gil Mellé
- Released: 1956
- Recorded: August 10 & 26, 1956
- Genre: Jazz
- Length: 53:00
- Label: Prestige

Gil Mellé chronology
Primitive Modern (1956)	Gil's Guests (1956)	Quadrama (1957)

Gil's Guests is an album by American saxophonist Gil Mellé recorded in 1956 and released on the Prestige label.

== Reception ==
The Allmusic review by Scott Yanow awarded the album 3 stars and stated "Baritonist Gil Melle's recordings are usually a bit unusual and this CD reissue is no exception... The charts are unpredictable and often dramatic, looking ahead toward a musical future that never occurred".

Professional ratings
Review scores
Source	Rating
Allmusic	3/5 stars

== Track listing ==
All compositions by Gil Mellé

1. "Soudan" - 6:21
2. "Tomorrow" - 6:10
3. "Block Island" - 4:57
4. "Sixpence" - 5:52
5. "Still Life" - 8:10
6. "Ghengis" - 3:46
7. "Funk for Star People" - 6:37 Bonus track on CD reissue
8. "Golden Age" - 6:46 Bonus track on CD reissue
9. "Herbie" - 4:21 Bonus track on CD reissue

- Recorded at Rudy Van Gelder Studio, Hackensack, New Jersey on August 10 (tracks 1–3) and August 24 (tracks 4–6), 1956 and January 18, 1957 (tracks 7–9).

== Personnel ==
- Gil Mellé - baritone saxophone
- Joe Cinderella - guitar (tracks 1–6)
- Vinnie Burke - bass (tracks 1–6)
- Ed Thigpen - drums (tracks 1–6)
- Hal McKusick - alto saxophone (tracks 1–6), flute (tracks 1–3)
- Art Farmer - trumpet (tracks 1–3)
- Kenny Dorham - trumpet (tracks 4–6)
- Julius Watkins - french horn (tracks 1–3)
- Don Butterfield - tuba (tracks 4–6)
- Phil Woods - alto saxophone (tracks 7–9)
- Seldon Powell - tenor saxophone (tracks 7–9)
- Donald Byrd - trumpet (tracks 7–9)
- Teddy Charles - vibraphone (tracks 7–9)
- George Duvivier - bass (tracks 7–9)
- Shadow Wilson - drums (tracks 7–9)
