= Patterns in Jazz =

Studio album by Gil Mellé
- Released: 1956
- Recorded: April 1, 1956
- Studio: Van Gelder Studio; Hackensack, NJ
- Genre: Jazz
- Length: 36:47
- Label: Blue Note; BLP 1517
- Producer: Alfred Lion

Gil Mellé chronology
Five Impressions of Color (1955)	Patterns in Jazz (1956)	Primitive Modern (1956)

Patterns in Jazz is an album by American jazz saxophonist Gil Mellé recorded on April 1, 1956 and released on Blue Note later that year. The quintet features trombonist Eddie Bert and rhythm section Joe Cinderella, Oscar Pettiford and Ed Thigpen.

== Reception ==
Professional ratings
Review scores
Source	Rating
AllMusic	4.5/5 stars

The AllMusic review by Stephen Thomas Erlewine states, "Gil Melle's debut album for Blue Note, is filled with bright, bold colors and identifiable patterns that camouflage how adventurous the work actually is. On the surface, the music is cool and laid-back, but close listening reveals the invention in Melle's compositions and arrangements of the standards... Ultimately, Patterns in Jazz is cerebral music that swings—it's entertaining, but stimulating."

== Track listing ==
All tracks are written by Gil Mellé, except as noted.

Side 1
No.	Title	Length
1.	"The Set Break"	4:48
2.	"Weird Valley"	5:13
3.	"The Arab Barber Blues"	9:05

Side 2
No.	Title	Writer(s)	Length
1.	"Nice Question"		8:17
2.	"Moonlight in Vermont"	John Blackburn; Karl Suessdorf	4:55
3.	"Long Ago (And Far Away)"	Ira Gershwin; Jerome Kern	4:34

== Personnel ==
=== Musicians ===
- Gil Mellé – baritone saxophone
- Eddie Bert – trombone
- Joe Cinderella – guitar
- Oscar Pettiford – bass
- Ed Thigpen – drums

=== Technical personnel ===
- Alfred Lion – producer
- Rudy Van Gelder – recording engineer
- Reid Miles – design
- Francis Wolff – photography
- Barry Ulanov – liner notes
