= Toshiko at Mocambo =

Toshiko At Mocambo

Live album by Toshiko Akiyoshi
- Released: 1954
- Recorded: 27, 28 July 1954
- Venue: Mocambo Club, Yokohama, Japan
- Genre: Jazz
- Length: 49:16
- Label: Rockwell / Polydor
- Producer: Kiyoshi Iwami; Shoichi Yui

Toshiko Akiyoshi chronology
Toshiko's Piano (1954)	Toshiko At Mocambo (1954)	The Toshiko Trio (1956)

3 CD compilation / re-issue
- Complete session

Toshiko at Mocambo (full title, Toshiko at Mocambo, The Historic Mocambo Session '54, Volume 3) was recorded by jazz pianist Toshiko Akiyoshi at the Mocambo club in Yokohama, Japan, in the summer of 1954. All four tracks from this recording as well as additional tracks from the same all-night live session with and without Akiyoshi were released on the 3 CD Rockwell – Polydor / Universal album, The Complete Historic Mocambo Session '54 – including, reportedly, a performance of "It's Only a Paper Moon" with Akiyoshi attempting to fill in on bass.

== Track listing ==
LP side A

1. "Fine and Dandy" (Swift, James) – 15:11
2. "Taking a Chance on Love" (Duke, Latouche, Fetter) – 8:52

LP side B

1. "Donna Lee" (Parker) – 9:41
2. "Air Conditioning" (Parker) – 15:32

== Personnel ==
- Toshiko Akiyoshi – piano
- Sadao Watanabe – alto saxophone
- Keiichiro Ebihara – alto saxophone ("Fine and Dandy")
- Akira Miyazawa – tenor saxophone (except "Taking A Chance On Love")
- Akitoshi Igarashi – alto saxophone ("Taking A Chance On Love")
- Gō Ueda – bass (except "Taking A Chance On Love")
- Jun Shimizu – drums (except "Fine and Dandy")
- Kanji Harada – drums ("Fine and Dandy")
