= Blues Bag =

Studio album by Buddy DeFranco
- Released: 1965
- Recorded: December 1 & 3, 1964
- Studio: United Recording Studios, Hollywood, CA
- Genre: Jazz
- Length: 37:23
- Label: Vee-Jay; VJLP 2506
- Producer: Leonard Feather

Buddy DeFranco chronology
The Girl from Ipanema (1964)	Blues Bag (1965)	The Glenn Miller Orchestra Returns to Glen Island Casino (1967)

Blues Bag, subtitled Leonard Feather's Encyclopedia Of Jazz - Jazz Of The '60s, Vol. 2, is an album by clarinetist Buddy DeFranco recorded in Los Angeles in late 1964 and released by the Vee-Jay label the following year.

== Critical reception ==
Professional ratings
Review scores
Source	Rating
AllMusic	3/5 stars

AllMusic reviewer Scott Yanow stated "The seven selections are all bluish with many of them actually being blues. ... This is intriguing music which makes one wish that Buddy DeFranco still played bass clarinet now and then".

== Track listing ==
1. "Blues Bag" (Buddy DeFranco) – 5:30
2. "Rain Dance" (Victor Feldman) – 5:37
3. "Straight, No Chaser" (Thelonious Monk) – 3:44
4. "Cousin Mary" (John Coltrane) – 4:40
5. "Blues Connotation" (Ornette Coleman) – 3:44
6. "Kush" (Dizzy Gillespie) – 7:48
7. "Twelve Tone Blues" (Leonard Feather) – 6:20

== Personnel ==
- Buddy DeFranco – clarinet, bass clarinet
- Freddy Hill (track 5), Lee Morgan (tracks 2 & 7) – trumpet
- Curtis Fuller – trombone (tracks 2, 5 & 7)
- Victor Feldman – piano, vibraphone
- Victor Sproles – bass
- Art Blakey – drums
