= Quadrama =

Studio album by Gil Mellé
- Released: 1957
- Recorded: April 26, 1957; Van Gelder Studio, Hackensack, New Jersey
- Genre: Jazz
- Label: Prestige; PRLP 7097
- Producer: Bob Weinstock

Gil Mellé chronology
Gil's Guests (1956)	Quadrama (1957)	Tome VI (1967)

Quadrama is an album by saxophonist and composer Gil Mellé recorded in 1957 and released on the Prestige label.

== Reception ==
Professional ratings
Review scores
Source	Rating
Allmusic	2/5 stars

Allmusic awarded the album 2 stars.

== Track listing ==
All compositions by Gil Mellé except as indicated

1. "Rush Hour in Hong Kong" - 6:49
2. "Jacqueline" - 5:16
3. "It Don't Mean a Thing (If It Ain't Got That Swing)" (Duke Ellington, Irving Mills) - 6:15
4. "In a Sentimental Mood" (Ellington, Mills, Manny Kurtz) - 4:45
5. "Walter Ego" - 3:20
6. "Full House" - 5:15
7. "Quadrama" - 3:35

== Personnel ==
- Gil Mellé - baritone saxophone
- Joe Cinderella - guitar
- George Duvivier - bass
- Shadow Wilson - drums

=== Production ===
- Bob Weinstock - supervisor
- Rudy Van Gelder - engineer
