= Night Train (Oscar Peterson album) =

Studio album by the Oscar Peterson Trio
- Released: 1963
- Recorded: December 15–16, 1962; Los Angeles, California
- Genre: Jazz
- Length: 44:08 (original release) 67:40 (1997 CD re-release)
- Label: Verve
- Producer: Norman Granz

The Oscar Peterson Trio chronology
Affinity (1962)	Night Train (1963)	Bill Henderson with the Oscar Peterson Trio (1963)

Night Train is an album by the Oscar Peterson Trio, released in 1963 by Verve Records. The album includes jazz, blues and R&B standards, as well as "Hymn to Freedom", one of Peterson's best known original compositions.

== Background ==
Album producer Norman Granz had sold the record label Verve, but remained Peterson's manager, and so supervised the Night Train recording session. The brief duration of many of the tracks has been attributed to a desire to have them played on commercial radio, which was reluctant to play any tracks longer than a few minutes.

The cover art photograph is by Pete Turner and original sleeve notes were by Benny Green.

The album was dedicated to Peterson's father, who worked as a sleeping-car attendant for Canadian Pacific Railways.

== Music and recording ==
A Jazz.com review notes that the title track, "Night Train," is evidence of Peterson's ability to balance musical innovation with popular appeal, as demonstrated throughout the album: "By using the basic elements of crescendo and diminuendo, and arranged sections to set off the parts, Peterson turns what could have been a throwaway into a minor masterpiece."

Night Train’s only original Oscar Peterson composition, "Hymn to Freedom," was written on the spot in the studio to close the album, following Norman Granz's suggestion that the band include a song with a "definitive early-blues feel." Peterson named the new song "Hymn to Freedom" in honor of Martin Luther King Jr., and after Harriette Hamilton wrote accompanying lyrics a year later, it became an unofficial anthem of the Civil Rights Movement. "Hymn to Freedom" is featured prominently in the 2021 documentary Oscar Peterson: Black + White as part of Peterson's enduring legacy.

Hymn to Freedom has been reinterpreted, in a jazz version, by Oliver Jones (piano), who is considered a disciple of Oscar Peterson; he described it as "A class act" album with changes to tempo, rhythm and structure and notable piano virtuosity. They played live together on 2004. Ben Webster (tenor sax) played it in "At ease" album hereby in an intimate version with extensive use of subtone.

On the 1997 CD reissue, an alternate take of "Night Train" is titled "Happy Go Lucky Local," the name of the 1946 Duke Ellington composition that is the basis of Jimmy Forrest's "Night Train." The alternate take features the same arrangement as the master take.

Ed Thigpen's rivet cymbal, recorded at very close range, is prominent on all issues of the album.

== Critical reception ==
Professional ratings
Review scores
Source	Rating
AllMusic	4.5/5 stars
The Encyclopedia of Popular Music	5/5 stars
The Penguin Guide to Jazz Recordings	4/4 stars
The Rolling Stone Jazz Record Guide	3/5 stars

For AllMusic, critic John Bush wrote that the release "includes stately covers of blues and R&B standards". The Penguin Guide to Jazz included it in its core collection, calling it “one of the best-constructed long-players of the period" and saying that Peterson's playing is "tight and uncharacteristically emotional".

In 2019, the album was named as the jury winner of the Polaris Heritage Prize.

== Influence ==
Diana Krall reported that listening to the album made being a jazz pianist her ambition. Linda May Han Oh reported that listening to the album inspired her to start playing upright bass.

== Track listing ==
Side one
No.	Title	Writer(s)	Length
1.	"Night Train"	Jimmy Forrest, Lewis P. Simpkins, Oscar Washington	4:52
2.	"C Jam Blues"	Barney Bigard, Duke Ellington	3:26
3.	"Georgia on My Mind"	Hoagy Carmichael, Stuart Gorrell	3:46
4.	"Bags' Groove"	Milt Jackson	5:43
5.	"Moten Swing"	Bennie Moten	2:55
6.	"Easy Does It"	Sy Oliver, Trummy Young	2:45

Side two
No.	Title	Writer(s)	Length
7.	"Honey Dripper"	Joe Liggins	2:24
8.	"Things Ain't What They Used to Be"	Mercer Ellington, Ted Persons	4:38
9.	"I Got It Bad (and That Ain't Good)"	Duke Ellington, Paul Francis Webster	5:08
10.	"Band Call"	Duke Ellington	3:55
11.	"Hymn to Freedom"	Oscar Peterson	5:38

1997 CD reissue bonus tracks
No.	Title	Writer(s)	Length
12.	"Happy Go Lucky Local (A.K.A. Night Train) (alternate take)"	Duke Ellington	5:00
13.	"Volare"	Franco Migliacci, Domenico Modugno, Mitchell Parish	2:49
14.	"My Heart Belongs to Daddy"	Cole Porter	3:57
15.	"Moten Swing (rehearsal take)"	Bennie Moten	3:36
16.	"Now's the Time"	Charlie Parker	2:36
17.	"This Could Be the Start of Something"	Steve Allen	5:11

(Tracks 12 through 17 are CD bonus tracks, not included on the original vinyl LP)

== Personnel ==
- Oscar Peterson - piano
- Ray Brown - double bass
- Ed Thigpen - drums

Technical personnel

- Norman Granz – production
- Val Valentin – recording engineering
- Pete Turner – cover photography
- Benny Green - sleeve notes

== Links ==
- Night Train at Discogs (list of releases)
