= Tome VI (Gil Mellé album) =

Studio album by Gil Mellé
- Released: 1968
- Recorded: February 8, 1968
- Studio: NYC
- Genre: Jazz
- Length: 37:25
- Label: Verve; V6-8744
- Producer: Peter Faith

Gil Mellé chronology
Quadrama (1957)	Tome VI (1968)	Waterbirds (1970)

Tome VI is an album by composer and bandleader Gil Mellé and the Jazz Electronauts recorded in 1968 and released on the Verve label.

== Reception ==
Professional ratings
Review scores
Source	Rating
AllMusic	3/5 stars

The Allmusic review by Richard S. Ginell stated "After several years of experimentation, Melle came up with what he portentously called "the first album of electronic jazz." More to the point for jazz listeners, Melle revamped his quartet to keep up with the cutting edge of jazz, playing soprano sax and adopting several mannerisms of modal and free styles while reserving the electronic effects mostly for somewhat free interludes in between the jazz workouts. ... This LP was a technical breakthrough of sorts, for the electronic instruments were being played live at a time when electronic music could only be heard on pre-recorded tape. Aesthetically, it is merely a curiosity".

== Track listing ==
All compositions by Gil Mellé,

1. "Blue Quasar" – 15:15
2. "Elgin Marble" – 4:15
3. "Man with the Flashlight" – 11:40
4. "Jog Falls Spinning Song" – 6:15

== Personnel ==
- Gil Mellé – soprano saxophone, Tome VI, effects generator, arranger
- Forrest Westbrook – piano, Electar
- Benfaral Matthews – bass, cello, Envelope
- Fred C. Stofflet – percussion, Doomsday Machine
