= Wallachs (clothiers) =

Defunct men's clothing store

Wallachs was a New York City men's clothing store which once maintained additional locations in Newark, New Jersey. It was a New York institution for more than a century. Together with Roots and F.R. Tripler, Wallachs was part of a nineteen state chain of fifty stores controlled by the Hastings Group. Hastings Group filed for Chapter 11 bankruptcy in November 1995.

Before the demand for tailored suits waned, the conglomerate operated approximately 200 stores. Wallach's also sold women's apparel.

== Locations and growth ==
In 1938 Wallachs' Manhattan and Bronx stores were located at Fifth Avenue at Forty-Fifth Street; 253 Broadway near New York City Hall; 53 Broadway near Wall Street; and Fordham Road near the corner of Marion Avenue. Additionally Wallach's had two stores in Brooklyn. One store was located on Court Street and the other in Kings Plaza on Flatbush Avenue.

A store measuring 22,000 square feet (2,000 m^{2}) was leased by Wallachs and became the largest of its stores in October 1954. It was in a nineteen-story office building at 555 Fifth Avenue. In 1966 Wallachs was a fifteen unit chain of stores.

== Price fixing lawsuit ==
In February 1956 a $3,000,000 antitrust lawsuit was filed against Wallachs and R.H. Macy & Company by Alexander's. The lawsuit alleged that the defendants were engaging in unlawful restraints and monopolies in trade. Alexander's contended that from 1935 to 1955 it purchased more than $1,000,000 in merchandise from clothing manufacturers David D. Doniger & Company and Laurelton Sportswear. For several years prior to 1955 both Wallachs and R.H. Macy & Company bought merchandise from the same manufacturers. Alexander's maintained that the prices for which it retailed the clothing was about 17% less than those offered by the competitors it was instigating legal action against. The complaint stated that since 1953 the defendants had conspired to eliminate Alexander's as a competitor by price fixing of products.

== Consumer friendly ==
In the mid 1970s, Wallachs held classes to instruct on how to tie a scarf. At one time Wallachs' customers and passersby were asked to come inside to have loose buttons sewn on or missing buttons replaced at no cost. Shoe laces, collar stays, hat bags, and feathers for hats were provided to shoppers who requested them. Additional free extras given out at retail counters included clothes brushes and identification tags which buttoned inside raincoats.
