= Swinging Brass with the Oscar Peterson Trio =

Studio album by Oscar Peterson
- Released: 1960
- Recorded: November 5, 1959
- Genre: Jazz
- Length: 49:11
- Label: Verve
- Producer: Norman Granz

Oscar Peterson chronology
Plays the Harold Arlen Songbook (1960)	Swinging Brass with the Oscar Peterson Trio (1960)	Ben Webster Meets Oscar Peterson (1960)

Professional ratings
Review scores
Source	Rating
AllMusic	3/5 stars
DownBeat	4/5 stars

Swinging Brass with the Oscar Peterson Trio is a studio album by Oscar Peterson, arranged by Russell Garcia.

== Track listing ==
1. "Con Alma" (Dizzy Gillespie) – 7:00
2. "Blues for Big Scotia" (Oscar Peterson) – 3:51
3. "The Spirit-Feel" (Milt Jackson) – 4:38
4. "Stockholm Sweetnin'" (Quincy Jones) – 4:05
5. "Cubano Chant" (Ray Bryant) – 4:05
6. "Little Pea's Blues" (Peterson) – 4:34
7. "Close Your Eyes" (Bernice Petkere) – 4:37
8. "O.P." (Russell Garcia, Peterson) – 2:53

== Personnel ==
Performance

- Oscar Peterson - piano
- Ray Brown - double bass
- Ed Thigpen - drums
- Russell Garcia - conductor, arranger

Production

- Norman Granz - producer
