= Joe Cinderella =

American music educator and jazz musician

- Birth name: Joseph Richard Cinderella
- Born: June 14, 1927; Newark, New Jersey, U.S.
- Died: October 27, 2012 (aged 85); Whiting, New Jersey
- Genres: Jazz
- Occupation(s): Musician, teacher
- Instrument: Guitar
- Years active: 1950s–2000s

Joseph Richard Cinderella (June 14, 1927 – October 27, 2012) was an American jazz guitarist and educator. Guitarist Eugene Chadbourne, writing for Allmusic.com, said of Cinderella: "He was a technically brilliant, original player who for long periods let his creative talents become obscured not by piles of soot and ash but by their musical equivalent, commercial studio jobs."

== Career ==
Joe Cinderella was born into an Italian family in Newark, New Jersey, in 1927. He played mandolin, imitating his father, before picking up guitar when he was nine years old. He admired the music of Charlie Christian and Eddie Lang, and he copied the licks of Django Reinhardt. He was drafted at the age of eighteen and lived at Camp Lee in Virginia. A staff sergeant who was interested in jazz guitar heard him playing. The sergeant gave him his own room, where he played guitar all day, and prevented him from being sent to Germany by putting him in a general's band as a drummer.

He married Angela Cipulla and lived in Paterson while working as a musician in New York City. In 1954, they had a daughter, Daria, who also studied music. In the 1950s, Cinderella recorded extensively with saxophonist Gil Mellé, and he accompanied vocalist Chris Connor with double bassist Vinnie Burke. He worked as a session guitarist for much of the 1960s, appearing on music for radio, television, and film. As a studio musician Cinderella performed with the Beach Boys, Billy Joel, and classical composer John Cage. He taught guitar in a New Jersey college from 1969 and wrote several instructional books for jazz guitar. He self-released the album Concept in 2002.

At William Paterson College he became a member of the adjunct faculty and helped establish the school's jazz guitar program.

Previously a resident of Upper Saddle River, New Jersey, Cinderella and his wife moved to a housing community in the Whiting section of Manchester Township, where he died from natural causes on October 27, 2012.

== Discography ==
=== As sideman ===
With Vinnie Burke

- East Coast Jazz 2 (Bethlehem, 1955)
- Bass by Pettiford/Burke with Oscar Pettiford (Bethlehem, 1957)

With Chris Connor

- Sings Lullabies for Lovers (Bethlehem, 1954)
- Sings Lullabies of Birdland (Bethlehem, 1956)

With Gil Mellé

- Gil's Guests (Prestige, 1956)
- Patterns in Jazz (Blue Note, 1956)
- Primitive Modern (Prestige, 1956)
- Quadrama (Prestige, 1957)
- Waterbirds (Nocturne, 1970)
