= Oscar Peterson Plays Harold Arlen =

Studio album by Oscar Peterson
- Released: 1955
- Recorded: November 15 & 16, 1954 in Los Angeles, CA
- Genre: Jazz
- Label: Clef
- Producer: Norman Granz

Oscar Peterson chronology
Oscar Peterson Plays Duke Ellington (1952)	Oscar Peterson Plays Harold Arlen (1955)	Buddy DeFranco and Oscar Peterson Play George Gershwin (1954)

Professional ratings
Review scores
Source	Rating
Allmusic	3/5 stars

Oscar Peterson Plays Harold Arlen is an album by Canadian jazz pianist Oscar Peterson, released in 1955.

== Track listing ==
1. "As Long as I Live"
2. "I Gotta Right to Sing the Blues"
3. "Come Rain or Come Shine" (Johnny Mercer)
4. "Ac-Cent-Tchu-Ate the Positive" (Mercer)
5. "Between the Devil and the Deep Blue Sea"
6. "I've Got the World on a String"
7. "It's Only a Paper Moon" (E. Y. Harburg, Billy Rose)
8. "That Old Black Magic" (Mercer)
9. "Let's Fall in Love"
10. "Stormy Weather"
11. "Blues in the Night" (Mercer)
12. "Over the Rainbow" (Yip Harburg)

All songs composed by Harold Arlen, with all lyrics by Ted Koehler. Other lyricists indicated.

== Personnel ==
- Oscar Peterson – piano
- Herb Ellis – guitar
- Ray Brown – double bass
