= Very Tall =

Studio album by Oscar Peterson with Milt Jackson
- Released: 1962
- Recorded: September 15 (tracks 1 & 6) and September 18 (tracks 2-5), 1961
- Studios: Fine Recording Studios; New York City, NY
- Genre: Jazz
- Length: 40:58
- Label: Verve V 8429
- Producer: Norman Granz

Oscar Peterson chronology
The Sound of the Trio (1961)	Very Tall (1962)	West Side Story (1962)

Milt Jackson chronology
The Modern Jazz Quartet & Orchestra (1961)	Very Tall (1962)	Statements (1962)

Very Tall is a 1962 album by the jazz pianist Oscar Peterson and his trio, with the vibraphonist Milt Jackson.

This album marked the first recorded collaboration between Peterson and Jackson; they would later appear together on the albums Reunion Blues (1971), The Milt Jackson Big 4 (1975), Ain't But a Few of Us Left (1981), and Two of the Few (1983).

== Reception ==
Professional ratings
Review scores
Source	Rating
AllMusic	4/5 stars
DownBeat	4/5 stars
The Penguin Guide to Jazz Recordings	3.5/4 stars

The Billboard review from January 27, 1962, praised Peterson and Jackson's "great sense of swing" and described the material as "a bit out of the ordinary", before concluding that album was "Strong jazz wax."

DownBeat jazz critic Leonard Feather gave the album four stars in his April 12, 1962, review and stated: "This was an alliance as successful as it was logical. Peterson and Jackson have far more in common musically than their regular contexts might imply."

Scott Yanow on AllMusic described the pairing of Peterson and Jackson as "so logical that it is surprising it did not occur five years earlier... Fortunately O.P. and Bags would meet up on records many times in the future (particularly during their Pablo years) but this first effort is a particularly strong set."

== Track listing ==
1. "On Green Dolphin Street" (Bronislaw Kaper, Ned Washington) – 7:32
2. "Heartstrings" (Milt Jackson) – 5:43
3. "Work Song" (Nat Adderley, Oscar Brown, Jr.) – 7:35
4. "John Brown's Body" (Traditional) – 7:49
5. "A Wonderful Guy" (Oscar Hammerstein II, Richard Rodgers) – 4:57
6. "Reunion Blues" (Jackson) – 7:22

== Personnel ==
- Oscar Peterson – piano
- Milt Jackson – vibraphone
- Ray Brown – double bass
- Ed Thigpen – drums
