= Buddy DeFranco =

American jazz clarinetist (1923–2014)

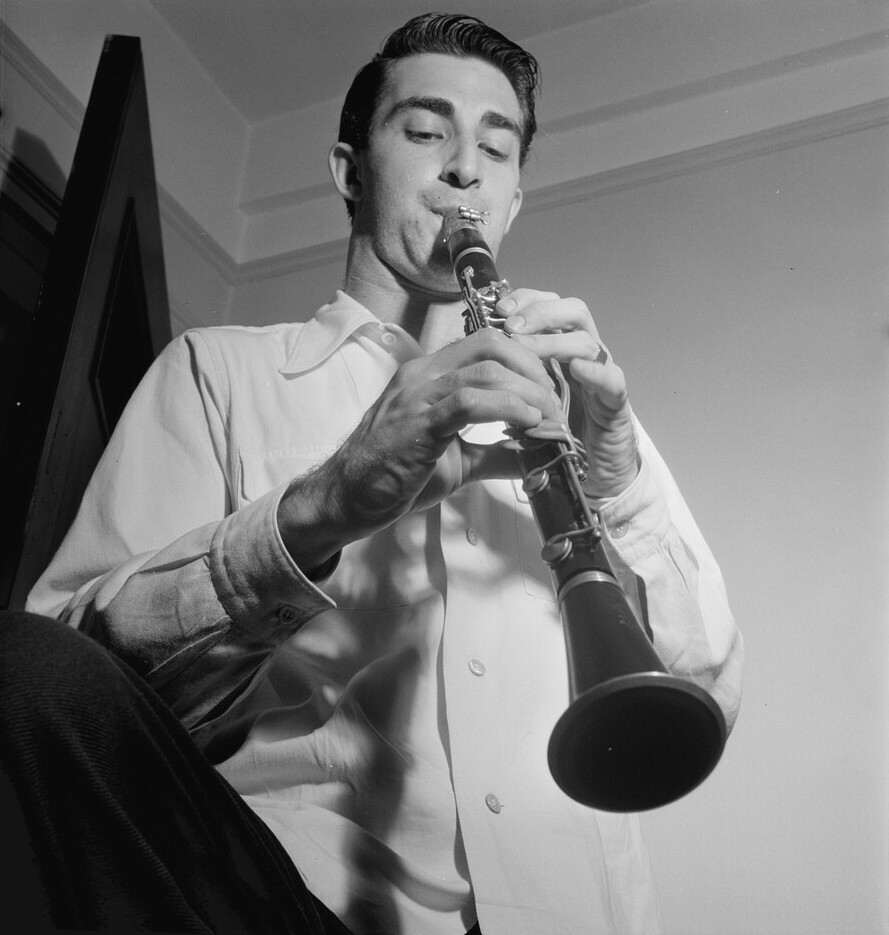
- DeFranco in New York, 1947

Background information
- Born: Boniface Ferdinand Leonard DeFranco; February 17, 1923; Camden, New Jersey, U.S.
- Died: December 24, 2014 (aged 91) Panama City, Florida, U.S.
- Genres: Jazz, bebop, post-bop
- Occupation: Musician
- Instruments: Clarinet, bass clarinet
- Years active: 1940s–2014
- Labels: Norgran, Verve, Mercury, Concord Jazz, Arbors, Pablo, Progressive.
- Formerly of: Glenn Miller Orchestra
- Website: www.buddydefranco.com

Boniface Ferdinand Leonard "Buddy" DeFranco (February 17, 1923 – December 24, 2014) was an American jazz clarinetist, universally recognized as the premier clarinetist of the bebop era. While the clarinet was the defining instrument of the swing era, DeFranco was virtually alone in successfully adapting the instrument to the complex harmonic structures and rapid tempos of bebop.

During his early career, DeFranco played with big band leaders such as Tommy Dorsey, Count Basie, and Gene Krupa before joining small groups alongside bebop innovators like Art Blakey, Charlie Parker, and Dizzy Gillespie. His technical mastery and innovative phrasing earned him unprecedented critical acclaim, winning twenty DownBeat magazine awards, nine Metronome awards, and sixteen Playboy All-Star awards.

Later in his career, DeFranco helped sustain the big band tradition, most notably serving as the musical director of the Glenn Miller Orchestra from 1966 to 1974. He remained an active performer and recording artist into his eighties and was named an NEA Jazz Master in 2006 for his lifelong contributions to the genre.

== Biography ==
Born in Camden, New Jersey, United States, DeFranco was raised in South Philadelphia. He was playing the clarinet by the time he was nine years old and within five years had won a national Tommy Dorsey swing contest.

He began his professional career just as swing music and big bands—many of which were led by clarinetists like Artie Shaw, and Benny Goodman—were in decline. While most jazz clarinet players did not adapt to this change, DeFranco successfully continued to play clarinet exclusively, and was one of the few bebop clarinetists.

In 1950, DeFranco spent a year with Count Basie's septet. He then led a small combo in the early 1950s which included pianist Sonny Clark and guitarist Tal Farlow. In this period, DeFranco recorded for MGM, Norgran and Verve; the latter two labels were owned by Norman Granz.

During the years 1960-64, DeFranco released four innovative quartet albums, as co-leader with the accordionist Tommy Gumina.

He was bandleader of the Glenn Miller Orchestra from 1966 to 1974, under the name, "The World Famous Glenn Miller Orchestra, Directed By Buddy DeFranco". He also performed with Gene Krupa, Art Blakey, Tommy Dorsey, Count Basie, Charlie Barnet, Art Tatum, Oscar Peterson, Lennie Tristano, Dodo Marmarosa, Terry Gibbs, Charlie Parker, Dizzy Gillespie, Miles Davis, Eddie Daniels, Andy Firth-musician, Don Burrows, Putte Wickman, Billie Holiday and many others, and released dozens of albums as a leader.

DeFranco died in Panama City, Florida, at the age of 91.

== Awards and honors ==
DeFranco won twenty awards from DownBeat magazine, nine awards from Metronome, and sixteen Playboy All-Stars awards.

In 2006, DeFranco was named an NEA Jazz Master by the National Endowment for the Arts, the highest official honor the United States bestows on jazz musicians. The award recognized his extensive career and his pivotal role in transitioning the clarinet from the swing era into the bebop movement.

Additionally, his contributions to jazz education were honored by the University of Montana, which named its annual jazz event the Buddy DeFranco Jazz Festival.

== Discography ==
=== The Glenn Miller Orchestra Under the Direction of Buddy DeFranco ===
- Glenn Miller in Tokyo (CBS Records, 1966)
- Something New (The Tijuana Brass Hits) (Epic Records, 1966)
- In the Mod (RCA Victor, 1967)
- The Glenn Miller Orchestra Returns To Glen Island Casino (RCA Victor, 1968)
- Makes the Goin' Great (RCA, 1968)
- Do You Wanna Dance (Command Records, ABC Records, 1969)
- Recorded Live, Royal Festival Hall, London, England (Paramount Records, 1971)
- The Best Of The Glenn Miller Orchestra Newly Recorded In Stereo (Columbia House, 1972)
- Skitch & Company (Army Reserve, 1973)
- The Ultimate 'In Stereo' Collection (Swing Rewind Records, 2016)

=== As leader ===
- Cool & Quiet with Lennie Tristano (Capitol, 1953)
- The Progressive Mr. DeFranco (Norgran, 1954)
- Pretty Moods (Norgran, 1954)
- The Artistry of Buddy DeFranco (Norgran, 1954)
- Buddy DeFranco and Oscar Peterson Play George Gershwin (Norgran, 1954)
- The Buddy DeFranco Wailers (Norgran, 1956)
- Sweet and Lovely (Verve, 1956)
- In a Mellow Mood (Norgran, 1956)
- Mr. Clarinet (Norgran, 1956)
- Jazz Tones (Norgran, 1956)
- Buddy DeFranco Plays Benny Goodman (Verve, 1957)
- The Art Tatum Buddy DeFranco Quartet (Verve, 1958)
- Cross Country Suite (Dot, 1958)
- Generalissimo (Verve, 1958)
- Buddy DeFranco and the Oscar Peterson Quartet (Verve, 1958)
- Live Date! (Verve, 1958)
- Buddy DeFranco Plays Artie Shaw (Verve, 1958)
- Cooking the Blues (Verve, 1958)
- Bravura (Verve, 1959)
- Pacific Standard Swingin'! Time with Tommy Gumina (Decca, 1960)
- Presenting with Tommy Gumina (Mercury, 1961)
- Kaleidoscope with Tommy Gumina (Mercury, 1962)
- Pol.Y.Tones with Tommy Gumina (Mercury, 1963)
- The Girl from Ipanema with Tommy Gumina (Mercury, 1964)
- Blues Bag (Vee Jay, 1965)
- Crosscurrents with Lennie Tristano (Capitol, 1972)
- Free Sail (Choice, 1974)
- Black Magic with Helen Forrest (Shamrock, 1975)
- Love Affair with a Clarinet Vol. 2 (Famous Solos, 1976)
- Sessions, Live (Callipe, 1976)
- Borinquin (Sonet, 1976)
- Waterbed (Choice, 1978)
- Buddy DeFranco with Jim Gillis (Classic Jazz, 1978)
- Closed Session (Verve, 1979)
- Buddy DeFranco (Famous Solos, 1980)
- Like Someone in Love (Progressive, 1980)
- Jazz Party: First Time Together with Terry Gibbs (Palo Alto, 1981)
- Eastern Exposure (Silver Crest, 1982)
- Buddy DeFranco Presents John Denman (Lud, 1983)
- Now's the Time with Terry Gibbs (Tall Tree, 1984)
- Mr. Lucky (Pablo, 1984)
- Hark with Oscar Peterson (Pablo, 1985)
- Groovin (Hep, 1985)
- Chicago Fire with Terry Gibbs (Contemporary, 1987)
- Holiday for Swing with Terry Gibbs (Contemporary, 1988)
- Garden of Dreams with Martin Taylor (ProJazz, 1988)
- Memories of You: A Tribute to Benny Goodman with Terry Gibbs, Herb Ellis (Contemporary, 1991)
- Kings of Swing with Terry Gibbs, Herb Ellis (Contemporary, 1992)
- Five Notes of Blues (Musidisc, 1992)
- Modern Clarinets: Museum of Modern Jazz (Verve, 1993)
- The Buenos Aires Concerts (Hep, 1995)
- Free Fall (Candid, 1996)
- You Must Believe in Swing with Dave McKenna (Concord Jazz, 1997)
- Do Nothing Till You Hear from Us! with Dave McKenna (Concord Jazz, 1999)
- The Champs with Putte Wickman (Gazell, 1999)
- Terry Gibbs and Buddy DeFranco Play Steve Allen (Contemporary, 1999)
- Gone with the Wind (Storyville, 1999)
- The Three Sopranos (hr-musik.de, 2001)
- Cookin' the Books (Arbors Records, 2003)
- Charlie Cat 2 (Arbors, 2007)
- Cookin' with Eiji Kitamura, Kiyoshi Takeshita (Jazz Cook, 2008)
- Down for Double with John Burnett Swing Orchestra (Delmark Records, 2010)

=== As sideman ===
With Tommy Dorsey

- Yes Indeed! (RCA Victor 1956)
- Tribute to Dorsey, Vol. 2 (RCA Victor, 1957)
- Tommy Dorsey's Greatest Band (20th Fox, 1959)

With Lionel Hampton

- The Lionel Hampton Quintet (Clef, 1954)
- Album #2 (Clef, 1955)
- Lionel Hampton and His All Stars (Columbia, 1957)

With others

- Charlie Barnet, Sky Liner (MCA, 1976)
- Count Basie, Blues by Basie (Columbia, 1956)
- Les Brown, Jazz Song Book (Coral, 1960)
- Ella Fitzgerald, Ella Fitzgerald Sings the Jerome Kern & Johnny Mercer Songbooks (Verve, 1976)
- Stan Getz, Stan Getz Blues (VSP, 1966)
- Billie Holiday, Ladylove (United Artists, 1962)
- Billie Holiday, Live in Cologne 1954 (Jazzline, 2014)
- Rolf Kuhn, Affairs (Intuition, 1997)
- Herbie Mann, Big Band Mann (VSP, 1966)
- Gerry Mulligan, Chet Baker Gerry Mulligan Buddy DeFranco (GNP, 1957)
- Joe Negri, Uptown Elegance (MCG, 2004)
- Flip Phillips, Flip Philllips Celebrates His 80th Birthday at the March of Jazz 1995 (Arbors, 2003)
- Tullio De Piscopo, Live in Zurich at Moods Club (Rai Trade, 2004)
- Buddy Rich, Buddy Rich at JATP (VSP, 1966)
