= Oscar Peterson Plays the Duke Ellington Song Book =

Plays the Duke Ellington Song Book

Studio album by Oscar Peterson
- Released: February 1960
- Recorded: July 14 – August 9, 1959
- Studio: Universal (Chicago)
- Genre: Jazz
- Label: Verve
- Producer: Norman Granz

Oscar Peterson chronology
Sonny Stitt Sits in with the Oscar Peterson Trio (1959)	Plays the Duke Ellington Song Book (1960)	Plays the Jerome Kern Songbook (1960)

Professional ratings
Review scores
Source	Rating
Allmusic	4/5 stars
DownBeat	3.5/5 stars
The Penguin Guide to Jazz Recordings	3/4 stars

Oscar Peterson Plays the Duke Ellington Song Book is a 1960 album by pianist Oscar Peterson of compositions written or performed by Duke Ellington. Peterson had recorded many of the pieces for his 1952 album Oscar Peterson Plays Duke Ellington, and had recently performed with Ella Fitzgerald on her 1957 album, Ella Fitzgerald Sings the Duke Ellington Song Book.

== Track listing ==
No.	Title	Lyrics	Music	Length
1.	"Don't Get Around Much Anymore"	Bob Russell	Duke Ellington	2:33
2.	"Sophisticated Lady"	Mitchell Parish	Duke Ellington and Irving Mills	2:26
3.	"Rockin' in Rhythm"		Ellington, Carney, Mills	2:15
4.	"Prelude to a Kiss"	Mack Gordon	Duke Ellington and Irving Mills	2:31
5.	"In a Mellow Tone"	Milt Gabler	Duke Ellington	3:43
6.	"Cotton Tail""	Duke Ellington	Duke Ellington	2:23
7.	"Just A-Sittin' and A-Rockin'"	Lee Gaines	Duke Ellington and Billy Strayhorn	2:58
8.	"Things Ain't What They Used to Be"	Ted Persons	Mercer Ellington	3:07
9.	"Take the "A" Train"		Strayhorn	3:04
10.	"I Got It Bad (and That Ain't Good)"	Paul Francis Webster	Duke Ellington	3:12
11.	"Do Nothing till You Hear from Me"	Bob Russell	Duke Ellington	2:15
12.	"John Hardy's Wife"		Mercer Ellington	2:34

== Personnel ==
=== Performance ===
- Oscar Peterson – piano
- Ray Brown – double bass
- Ed Thigpen – drums
