= Gil Mellé =

American artist, musician and composer

- Born: Gilbert John Mellé; December 31, 1931; New York City, U.S.
- Died: October 28, 2004 (aged 72) Malibu, California, U.S.
- Genres: Jazz, electronic, experimental, third stream
- Occupations: Musician, composer, artist, sound engineer
- Instruments: Synthesizer; tenor, baritone, and soprano saxophones
- Years active: 1953-2004

Gilbert John Mellé (December 31, 1931 – October 28, 2004) was an American jazz musician, film score composer, and artist.

== Life and career ==
In the 1950s, Mellé created the cover art for albums by Miles Davis, Thelonious Monk, and Sonny Rollins. Mellé led a number of sessions recorded for the Blue Note and Prestige labels between 1952 and 1957. He also appeared at the first Newport Jazz Festival, leading a band that also contained Joe Cinderella, Vinnie Burke, and Ed Thigpen.

As a film and TV composer, Mellé was one of the first to use self-built electronic instruments, played either alone or alongside an orchestra. Mellé died in Malibu, California on October 28, 2004.

== Discography ==
=== As composer and arranger ===
- Gil Mellé Quintet/Sextet (New Faces - New Sounds) (Blue Note, 1953)
- Gil Mellé Quintet with Urbie Green and Tal Farlow - Volume 2 (Blue Note, 1953)
- Gil Mellé Quartet featuring Lou Mecca - Volume 3 (Blue Note, 1954)
- Gil Mellé Quintet with Don Butterfield - 5 Impressions of Color (Blue Note, 1955)
- Patterns in Jazz (Blue Note, 1956)
- Primitive Modern (Prestige, 1956)
- Gil's Guests (Prestige, 1956)
- Quadrama (Prestige, 1957)
- Tome VI (Verve, 1967)
- Waterbirds (Nocturne, 1970)
- The Andromeda Strain (Kapp, 1971)
- Mindscape (Blue Note, 1989)
- The Organization (Intrada, 2010). World premiere release of the original soundtrack of the 1971 film. Produced by Douglass Fake. Liner notes by James Phillips. Art Direction by Joe Sikoyak.
- Borderline (Intrada, 2012). World premiere release of the original score to the 1980 film. Produced by Douglass Fake. Liner Notes by James Phillips. Art Direction by Joe Sikoyak.

=== Film scores ===
- The Andromeda Strain (1971)
- The Organization (1971)
- The Manipulator (1971)
- You'll Like My Mother (1972)
- Bone (1972)
- The Ultimate Warrior (1975)
- Embryo (1976)
- Starship Invasions (1977)
- The Sentinel (1977)
- Blood Beach (1980)
- Borderline (1980)
- The Last Chase (1981)
- Hot Target (1985)

=== Television scores ===
==== Television series ====
- Ironside (1968) - 1 episode
- Then Came Bronson (1969–70) - 2 episodes
- Night Gallery (1969–73) - Theme music
- The Psychiatrist (1970–71) - Theme music
- Columbo (1971–72) - 4 episodes
- Tenafly (1973) - 4 episodes
- Kolchak: The Night Stalker (1974–75) - Theme music
- World War III (1982) - Miniseries
- Fatal Vision (1984) - Miniseries
- Veronica Clare (1991) - 9 episodes

==== Television films ====
- Lieutenant Schuster's Wife (1972)
- That Certain Summer (1972)
- The Victim (1972)
- The Judge and Jake Wyler (1972)
- The Astronaut (1972)
- Future Shock (1972)
- A Cold Night's Death (1973)
- The Six Million Dollar Man (1973)
- Partners in Crime (1973)
- Savage (1973)
- The President's Plane Is Missing (1973)
- Trapped (1973)
- The Six Million Dollar Man: The Solid Gold Kidnapping (1973)
- Frankenstein: The True Story (1973)
- Legend in Granite (1973)
- The Questor Tapes (1974)
- Killdozer! (1974)
- Hitchhike (1974)
- The Last Angry Man (1974)
- The Savage Is Loose (1974)
- The Missing Are Deadly (1975)
- A Cry for Help (1975)
- The Imposter (1975)
- Crime Club (1975)
- Death Scream (1975)
- The Art of Crime (1975)
- Dynasty (1976)
- Perilous Voyage (1976)
- Gold of the Amazon Women (1979)
- A Vacation in Hell (1979)
- Attica (1980)
- The Curse of King Tut's Tomb (1980)
- Rape and Marriage: The Rideout Case (1980)
- The Intruder Within (1981)
- Through Naked Eyes (1983)
- Jealousy (1984)
- Best Kept Secrets (1984)
- Flight 90: Disaster on the Potomac (1984)
- Sweet Revenge (1984)
- Starcrossed (1985)
- When Dreams Come True (1985)
- Killer in the Mirror (1986)
- The Deliberate Stranger (1986)
- Circle of Violence: A Family Drama (1986)
- Stillwatch (1987)
- The Taking of Flight 847: The Uli Derickson Story (1988)
- From the Dead of Night (1989)
- The Case Of The Hillside Stranglers (1989)
- So Proudly We Hail (1990)
- Good Cops, Bad Cops (1990)
- Fire: Trapped on the 37th Floor (1991)
- Night Owl (1993)

== Awards and nominations ==
- 1972 Golden Globe Award for Best Original Score: The Andromeda Strain (nominated)
