= Sonny Stitt Sits in with the Oscar Peterson Trio =

Sonny Stitt Sits In with the Oscar Peterson Trio

Studio album by Sonny Stitt with Oscar Peterson
- Released: 1959
- Recorded: May 18, 1959
- Genre: Jazz
- Length: 39:04
- Label: Verve
- Producer: Norman Granz

Sonny Stitt chronology
A Little Bit of Stitt (1959)	Sonny Stitt Sits In with the Oscar Peterson Trio (1959)	Sonny Side Up (1959)

Oscar Peterson chronology
Louis Armstrong Meets Oscar Peterson (1959)	Sonny Stitt Sits In with the Oscar Peterson Trio (1959)	Plays the Duke Ellington Song book (1960)

Professional ratings
Review scores
Source	Rating
Allmusic	4.5/5 stars
Penguin Guide to Jazz	3.5/4 stars

Sonny Stitt Sits in with the Oscar Peterson Trio is a 1959 album by Sonny Stitt, accompanied by the Oscar Peterson trio.

== Reception ==
The Penguin Guide to Jazz rated the album three and a half stars out of four and wrote of the session, "they intermingle their respective many-noted approaches as plausibly as if this were a regular band (in fact, they never recorded together again)." The Allmusic review written by Scott Yanow rated the album four and a half stars out of five.

== Track listing ==
1. "I Can't Give You Anything But Love" (Dorothy Fields, Jimmy McHugh) – 4:05
2. "Au Privave" (Charlie Parker) – 3:59
3. "The Gypsy" (Billy Reid) – 3:25
4. "I'll Remember April" (Gene de Paul, Patricia Johnston, Don Raye) – 4:41
5. "Scrapple from the Apple" (Parker) – 4:20
6. "Moten Swing" (Bennie Moten) – 7:09
7. "Blues for Pres, Sweets, Ben and All the Other Funky Ones" (Sonny Stitt) – 6:04
8. "Easy Does It" (Sy Oliver, Trummy Young) – 5:21

== Personnel ==
=== Performance ===
- Sonny Stitt – alto saxophone (tracks 1–5), tenor saxophone (tracks 6–8)

Oscar Peterson Trio

- Oscar Peterson – piano
- Ray Brown – double bass
- Ed Thigpen – drums
