= Oscar Peterson Plays the Jerome Kern Songbook =

Studio album by Oscar Peterson
- Released: May 1960
- Recorded: July 14 – August 9, 1959
- Studio: Universal (Chicago)
- Genre: Jazz
- Length: 32:18
- Label: Verve
- Producer: Norman Granz

Oscar Peterson chronology
Oscar Peterson Plays the Duke Ellington Song book (1960)	Oscar Peterson Plays the Jerome Kern Songbook (1960)	Oscar Peterson Plays the Harold Arlen Songbook (1960)

Professional ratings
Review scores
Source	Rating
Allmusic	4/5 stars

Oscar Peterson Plays the Jerome Kern Songbook is a 1960 album by Oscar Peterson, of compositions by Jerome Kern.

== Track listing ==
1. "I Won't Dance" (Dorothy Fields, Oscar Hammerstein II, Otto Harbach, Jimmy McHugh) – 2:32
2. "Bill" (Hammerstein) – 2:58
3. "The Song Is You" (Hammerstein) – 3:04
4. "A Fine Romance" (Fields) – 3:09
5. "Can't Help Lovin' Dat Man" (Hammerstein) – 2:45
6. "Ol' Man River" (Hammerstein) – 2:38
7. "Long Ago (and Far Away)" (Ira Gershwin) – 2:35
8. "Lovely to Look At" (Fields, McHugh) – 2:48
9. "Pick Yourself Up" (Fields) – 2:12
10. "Smoke Gets in Your Eyes" (Harbach) – 2:49
11. "The Way You Look Tonight" (Fields) – 3:41
12. "Yesterdays" (Harbach) – 3:17

All music written by Jerome Kern, lyricists indicated.

== Personnel ==
=== Performance ===
- Ray Brown - double bass
- Oscar Peterson - piano
- Ed Thigpen - drums
