= Ed Thigpen =

American jazz drummer (1930–2010)

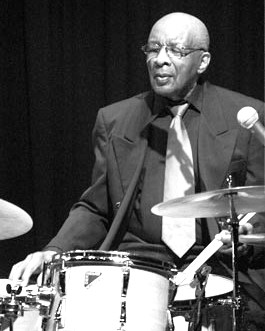

Background information
- Born: Edmund Leonard Thigpen; December 28, 1930; Chicago, Illinois, U.S.
- Died: January 13, 2010 (aged 79) Copenhagen, Denmark
- Genres: Jazz
- Occupation: Musician
- Instrument: Drums
- Years active: 1951–2010
- Website: www.edthigpen.com

Edmund Leonard Thigpen (December 28, 1930 – January 13, 2010) was an American jazz drummer, best known for his work with the Oscar Peterson trio from 1959 to 1965. Thigpen also performed with the Billy Taylor trio from 1956 to 1959.

== Biography ==
Born in Chicago, Thigpen was raised in Los Angeles, and attended Thomas Jefferson High School, where Art Farmer, Dexter Gordon, and Chico Hamilton also attended. After majoring in sociology at Los Angeles City College, Thigpen returned to East St. Louis for one year to pursue music while living with his father who had been playing with Andy Kirk's Clouds of Joy. His father, Ben Thigpen, was a drummer who played with Andy Kirk for sixteen years during the 1930s and 1940s.

Thigpen first worked professionally in New York City with the Cootie Williams orchestra from 1951 to 1952 at the Savoy Ballroom. During this time he played with musicians such as Dinah Washington, Gil Mellé, Oscar Pettiford, Eddie Vinson, Paul Quinichette, Ernie Wilkins, Charlie Rouse, Lennie Tristano, Jutta Hipp, Johnny Hodges, Dorothy Ashby, Bud Powell, and Billy Taylor.

In 1959, he replaced guitarist Herb Ellis in the Oscar Peterson Trio in Toronto, Ontario, Canada. In 1961, he recorded in Los Angeles, featuring on the Teddy Edwards–Howard McGhee Quintet album entitled Together Again!!!! for the Contemporary label with Phineas Newborn Jr. and Ray Brown. After leaving Peterson, Thigpen recorded the album Out of the Storm as a leader for Verve in 1966. He then went on to tour with Ella Fitzgerald from 1967 to 1972.

In 1972, Thigpen moved to Copenhagen, joining several other American jazz musicians who had settled in that city over the previous two decades. There he worked with fellow American expatriates, including Kenny Drew, Ernie Wilkins, Thad Jones, as well as leading Danish jazz musicians such as Svend Asmussen, Mads Vinding, Alex Riel, and Niels-Henning Ørsted Pedersen. He also played with a variety of other leading musicians of the time, such as Clark Terry, Eddie "Lockjaw" Davis, Milt Jackson, and Monty Alexander.

Thigpen died peacefully after a brief period in Hvidovre Hospital in Copenhagen on January 13, 2010. He had been hospitalized for heart and lung problems and was also suffering from Parkinson's disease. He is buried at Vestre Kirkegård.

== Awards and recognition ==
Thigpen was inducted into the Percussive Arts Society Hall of Fame in 2002.

== Discography ==
=== As leader ===
- Out of the Storm (Verve, 1966)
- Action-Re-Action (Sonet, 1974)
- Explosive Drums (Black & Blue, 1974)
- Young Men and Olds (Timeless, 1990)
- Easy Flight (Stunt, 1990)
- Mr. Taste (Justin Time Records, 1992)
- It's Entertainment (Stunt, 1998)
- Element of Swing (Stunt, 2002)
- #1 (Stunt, 2004)

=== As sideman ===
With Gene Ammons

- Velvet Soul (Prestige, 1964) – rec. 1962
- Angel Eyes (Prestige, 1965) – rec. 1962
- Sock! (Prestige, 1965) – rec. 1962

With Art Farmer

- Three Trumpets with Donald Byrd and Idrees Sulieman (Prestige, 1957)
- Manhattan (Soul Note, 1981)

With Jutta Hipp

- At the Hickory House Volume 1 (Blue Note, 1956) – live
- At the Hickory House Volume 2 (Blue Note, 1956) – live
- Jutta Hipp with Zoot Sims (Blue Note, 1957) – rec. 1956

With Duke Jordan

- Flight to Denmark (SteepleChase, 1974) – rec. 1973
- Two Loves (SteepleChase, 1975) – rec. 1973
- Truth (SteepleChase, 1983) – rec. 1975

With Gil Mellé

- Patterns in Jazz (Blue Note, 1956)
- Primitive Modern (Prestige, 1956)
- Gil's Guests (Prestige, 1957)

With Oscar Peterson

- Oscar Peterson Plays "My Fair Lady" (Verve, 1958)
- Sonny Stitt Sits in with the Oscar Peterson Trio (Verve, 1958)
- A Jazz Portrait of Frank Sinatra (Verve, 1959)
- The Jazz Soul of Oscar Peterson (Verve, 1959)
- Porgy and Bess (Verve, 1959)
- Oscar Peterson Plays the Duke Ellington Songbook (Verve, 1959)
- Oscar Peterson Plays the George Gershwin Songbook (Verve, 1959)
- Oscar Peterson Plays the Richard Rodgers Songbook (Verve, 1959)
- Oscar Peterson Plays the Jerome Kern Songbook (Verve, 1959)
- Oscar Peterson Plays the Cole Porter Songbook (Verve, 1959)
- Oscar Peterson Plays the Harry Warren Songbook (Verve, 1959)
- Oscar Peterson Plays the Irving Berlin Songbook (Verve, 1959)
- Oscar Peterson Plays the Harold Arlen Songbook (Verve, 1959)
- Oscar Peterson Plays the Jimmy McHugh Songbook (Verve, 1959)
- Oscar Peterson Plays Porgy & Bess (Verve, 1959)
- Swinging Brass with the Oscar Peterson Trio (Verve, 1959)
- Ben Webster Meets Oscar Peterson (Verve, 1959)
- Live from Chicago (Verve, 1961)
- Very Tall (Verve, 1961)
- Night Train (Verve, 1962)
- Affinity (Verve, 1962)
- West Side Story (Verve, 1962)
- The Oscar Peterson Trio in Tokyo 1964 (Pablo, 1964)
- We Get Requests (Verve, 1964)
- Oscar Peterson Trio + One – with Clark Terry (Verve, 1964)
- I/We Had a Ball (Limelight, 1965) - 1 track
- Eloquence (Limelight, 1965)
- Action (Exclusively for My Friends, Vol. 1) (MPS, 1968)
- Oscar Peterson with Clark Terry (Mercury Jazz Masters, 1982)

With Ella Fitzgerald

- Ella à Nice (Pablo, 1971) – live
- Jazz at Santa Monica Civic '72 (Pablo, 1972) – live
- Ella Loves Cole (Atlantic, 1972) – reissued as Dream Dancing (Pablo, 1978)
- Ella in Budapest, Hungary (Pablo, 1999) – live rec. 1970

With Billy Taylor

- My Fair Lady Loves Jazz (ABC-Paramount, 1957)
- The New Billy Taylor Trio (ABC-Paramount, 1957)
- The Billy Taylor Touch (Atlantic, 1957)
- Taylor Made Jazz (Argo, 1959)

With Paul Quinichette and Charlie Rouse

- The Chase Is On (Bethlehem, 1958) – rec. 1957
- When The Blues Comes On, Pt. 1&2 (Bethlehem, 1957)

With others

- Toshiko Akiyoshi, The Toshiko Trio (Storyville, 1956)
- Dorothy Ashby, The Jazz Harpist (Regent, 1957)
- Svend Asmussen, As Time Goes By (Sonet, 1978)
- Berlin Contemporary Jazz Orchestra, Berlin Contemporary Jazz Orchestra (ECM, 1990) – rec. 1989
- Kenny Burrell, Earthy (Prestige, 1957)
- Benny Carter, Summer Serenade (Storyville, 1982) – rec. 1980
- Teddy Charles, Salute to Hamp (Bethlehem, 1958)
- Kenny Drew, Your Soft Eyes (Soul Note, 1981)
- Teddy Edwards–Howard McGhee Quintet, Howard McGhee/Teddy Edwards – Together Again!!!! (Contemporary M 3588, S 7588; Fantasy OJC 424, OJCCD 424-2)
- Dexter Gordon, More Than You Know (SteepleChase, 1975)
- Johnny Griffin, Blues for Harvey (SteepleChase, 1973)
- Indianerne, Sound (ILK Music, 2011)[LP] – rec. 2009–10
- Oliver Jones, A Class Act (Justin Time Records, 1991)
- John Lindberg, Albert Mangelsdorff & Eric Watson, Quartet Afterstorm (Black Saint, 1994)
- Mundell Lowe, A Grand Night for Swinging (Riverside, 1957)
- Howard McGhee and Teddy Edwards, Together Again!!!! (Contemporary, 1961)
- Frank Minion, The Soft Land of Make Believe (Bethlehem, 1959)
- Tony Ortega, Jazz for Young Moderns (Bethlehem, 1959) – rec. 1958–59
- Horace Parlan, Arrival (SteepleChase, 1973)
- Oscar Pettiford, Winner's Circle (Bethlehem, 1957)
- Jack van Poll, Cat's Groove (September, 1988)
- Paul Quinichette, On the Sunny Side (Prestige, 1957)
- Charlie Rouse and Paul Quinichette, The Chase Is On (Bethlehem, 1958)
- Cal Tjader, The Prophet (Verve 1968)
- Eddie "Cleanhead" Vinson, Clean Head's Back in Town (Bethlehem, 1957)
- Eric Watson and Mark Dresser, Silent Hearts (Sunnyside, 2001)
- Frank Wess, Jazz for Playboys (Savoy, 1957)
- Ernie Wilkins on the Everest labe, Everest Years (VI Music, 2005)
- Kai Winding and Curtis Fuller, Giant Bones '80 (Sonet, 1980)
- Webster Young, For Lady (Prestige, 1957)
