= Social Call (Betty Carter album) =

Studio album by Betty Carter
- Released: 1980
- Recorded: May 13, 1955 and April 25, 1956
- Genre: Jazz
- Length: 57:27
- Label: Columbia
- Producer: Betty Carter (reissue)

Betty Carter chronology
Meet Betty Carter and Ray Bryant (1955)	Social Call (1980)	Out There (1958)

Professional ratings
Review scores
Source	Rating
Allmusic	link
The Rolling Stone Jazz Record Guide	4/5 stars
DownBeat	5/5 stars

Social Call is an album by Betty Carter featuring Ray Bryant and a big band arranged by Gigi Gryce. Of its eleven tracks, the first six were recorded in 1955 and originally released as part of the album Meet Betty Carter and Ray Bryant. The other five tracks were recorded in 1956 but remained unissued until this compilation, which Columbia Records released in 1980.

== Track listing ==
1. "Moonlight in Vermont" (John Blackburn, Karl Suessdorf) – 3:23
2. "Thou Swell" (Lorenz Hart, Richard Rodgers) – 1:39
3. "I Could Write a Book" (Hart, Rodgers) – 2:37
4. "Gone with the Wind" (Herbert Magidson, Allie Wrubel) – 4:10
5. "The Way You Look Tonight" (Dorothy Fields, Jerome Kern) – 2:42
6. "Can't We Be Friends?(Paul James, Kay Swift) – 2:25
7. "Tell Him I Said Hello" (Jack J. Canning, Bill Hagner) – 2:32
8. "Social Call" (Gigi Gryce, Jon Hendricks) – 2:37
9. "Runaway" (Cy Coleman) – 2:28
10. "Frenesi" (Alberto Domínguez, Leonard Whitcup) – 2:29
11. "Let's Fall in Love" (Harold Arlen, Ted Koehler) – 1:57

== Personnel ==
Recorded May 13 & 16, 1955, New York City, New York, USA (tracks 1–6):

- Betty Carter - vocals
- Ray Bryant - piano
- Jerome Richardson - flute, saxophone
- Wendell Marshall - double bass
- Jo Jones - drums

Recorded April 25, 1956 (tracks 7–11):

- Betty Carter - vocals
- Gigi Gryce - arranger and leader
- Bernie Glow, Nick Travis, Conte Candoli, Joe Ferrante - trumpet
- Urbie Green, Jimmy Cleveland - trombone
- Sam Marowitz, Al Cohn, Seldon Powell, Danny Bank - saxophone
- Hank Jones - piano
- Milt Hinton - double bass
- Osie Johnson - drums
