= Feed the Fire (Betty Carter album) =

1994 live album by jazz singer Betty Carter

Live album by Betty Carter
- Released: Autumn 1994
- Recorded: October 30, 1993
- Venue: Royal Festival Hall, London
- Genre: Vocal jazz
- Length: 73:07
- Label: Verve 314-513870-2
- Producer: Richard Seidel, Betty Carter

Betty Carter chronology
It's Not About the Melody (1992)	Feed the Fire (1994)	I'm Yours, You're Mine (1996)

Feed the Fire is a 1994 live album by the American jazz singer Betty Carter. The album was recorded at London's Royal Festival Hall during Carter's European tour. It was Carter's first live album since 1990's Droppin' Things, and her only album recorded outside of the United States.

Carter, who predominantly worked with young musicians at this stage of her career, was accompanied by an established trio of pianist Geri Allen, bassist Dave Holland and drummer Jack DeJohnette. The trio would reunite a year later with Carter for a performance at the San Francisco Jazz Festival, and after Carter's death, for Allen's 2004 album, The Life of a Song.

Feed the Fire peaked at 18 on the Billboard Top Jazz Albums chart.

The audio of the concert was recorded by the BBC, and amounted to 105 minutes. Carter only chose to release ten of the fourteen tunes performed, and the released concert amounted to less than an hour's worth of music.

== Reception ==
Professional ratings
Review scores
Source	Rating
AllMusic	2.5/5 stars
The Penguin Guide to Jazz	4/4 stars
The Virgin Encyclopedia of Eighties Music	3/5 stars

In his review for AllMusic.com, Daniel Gioffre gave the album two-and-a-half stars out of five. Gioffre praised Carter's accompanists, describing Dave Holland's "...unerring sense of melody and pitch", Jack DeJohnette as "...nothing less than explosive, punctuating the solo statements of his bandmates with powerful flurries", and likened Geri Allen to fellow pianist Keith Jarrett, praising her solo on "Love Notes". Gioffre's wrote that Carter's "...vocal improvisations are on par with any instrumentalists," and described her "...dancing around the music with impeccable phrasing, dropping low into her register for punctuation" on "Lover Man" as "...heady, hypnotizing stuff." Gioffre reserved criticism for the length of some tracks and that the "...quality of the music itself tends to wander a bit."

New York magazine described the album as a "live state-of-jazz-vocals address" and Carter as "probably the most agile jazz singer alive."

The Chicago Tribune's Howard Reich stated that the album "captures the singer at her best," and noted that the band members "provide the atmospheric accompaniment, sensitively responding to Carter's mercurial improvisations."

Michael J. West of JazzTimes praised Allen's contribution to the title track, which she wrote. He commented: "there's nothing quite like hearing her go at it with the master vocalist... Allen stays almost completely inside as she works with Carter; even so, it's an open question who's leading who... the energy is electric and the swing... is top-notch."

Writing for Sandy Brown Jazz, Steve Day remarked: "Every track is diamond, 'I'm All Smiles' and 'Feed The Fire' exceptionally so. These are performances that ring the truth of music."

== Track listing ==
1. "Feed the Fire" (Geri Allen) – 11:20
2. "Love Notes" (Betty Carter, Mark Zubek) – 7:11
3. "Sometimes I'm Happy" (Irving Caesar, Clifford Grey, Vincent Youmans) – 3:33
4. "Lover Man (Oh Where Can You Be?)" (Jimmy Davis, Ram Ramirez, Jimmy Sherman) – 9:13
5. "I'm All Smiles" (Michael Leonard, Herbert Martin) – 5:26
6. "If I Should Lose You" (Ralph Rainger, Leo Robin) – 6:24
7. "All or Nothing at All" (Arthur Altman, Jack Lawrence) – 8:11
8. "What Is This Tune?" (Carter, Jack DeJohnette) – 7:20
9. "Day Dream" (Duke Ellington, John Latouche, Billy Strayhorn) – 12:08
10. "B's Blues" (Carter) – 2:21

== Personnel ==
Performance

- Betty Carter – vocals, executive producer
- Geri Allen – piano
- Dave Holland – double bass
- Jack DeJohnette – drums

Production

- Patricia Lie – art direction
- James Birtwhistle – engineer
- McDavid Hendersen – illustrations
- Rich Cook – liner notes
- Andrew Pothecary – photography
- Camille Tominaro – post production coordinator
- Richard Seidel – producer
- Ben Mundy – product manager
