= Easy Living (Ella Fitzgerald and Joe Pass album) =

Studio album by Ella Fitzgerald and Joe Pass
- Released: 1986
- Recorded: February 25,28, 1986
- Genre: Jazz
- Length: 56:14
- Label: Pablo
- Producer: Norman Granz

Ella Fitzgerald chronology
| Nice Work If You Can Get It (1983) | Easy Living (1986) | All That Jazz (1989) |

Joe Pass chronology
| University of Akron Concert (1985) | Easy Living (1986) | Sound Project (1987) |

Easy Living is a 1986 studio album by Ella Fitzgerald, accompanied by guitarist Joe Pass. Fitzgerald was nominated for the Grammy Award for Best Jazz Vocal Performance, Female at the 30th Annual Grammy Awards for her performance on this album.

This was the fourth and final album in Fitzgerald's series of duets with Pass, the three earlier albums being Take Love Easy (1973), Fitzgerald and Pass... Again (1976) and Speak Love (1983).

== Reception ==
Professional ratings
Review scores
| Source | Rating |
|---|---|
| AllMusic | 2/5 stars |
| The Penguin Guide to Jazz Recordings | 3/4 stars |

In his AllMusic review, critic Scott Yanow wrote that "her voice was visibly fading, although her charm and sense of swing were still very much present. But this CD is not one of her more significant recordings, other than being one of the final chapters."

== Track listing ==
1. "My Ship" (Kurt Weill, Ira Gershwin) – 4:26
2. "Don't Be That Way" (Benny Goodman, Mitchell Parish, Edgar Sampson) – 3:00
3. "My Man" (Maurice Yvain, Jacques Charles, Albert Willemetz, Channing Pollock) – 3:28
4. "Don't Worry 'Bout Me" (Rube Bloom, Ted Koehler) – 2:46
5. "Days of Wine and Roses" (Henry Mancini, Johnny Mercer) – 3:04
6. "Easy Living" (Ralph Rainger, Leo Robin) – 4:14
7. "I Don't Stand a Ghost of a Chance with You" (Victor Young, Bing Crosby, Ned Washington) – 6:02
8. "Love for Sale" (Cole Porter) – 4:38
9. "Moonlight in Vermont" (Karl Suessdorf, John Blackburn) – 4:20
10. "On Green Dolphin Street" (Bronislau Kaper, Ned Washington) – 3:25
11. "Why Don't You Do Right?" (Kansas Joe McCoy) – 2:56
12. "By Myself (1937 song)" (Arthur Schwartz, Howard Dietz) – 3:26
13. "I Want a Little Girl" (Murray Mencher, Billy Moll) – 2:46
14. "I'm Making Believe" (Mack Gordon, James V. Monaco) – 2:38
15. "On a Slow Boat to China" (Frank Loesser) – 5:05

== Personnel ==
- Ella Fitzgerald - vocals
- Joe Pass - guitar
