= The Music Never Stops =

Live album by Betty Carter
- Released: 2019
- Recorded: March 29, 1992
- Venue: Jazz at Lincoln Center, Aaron Davis Hall, New York City
- Genre: Jazz
- Length: 1:23:28
- Label: Blue Engine Records; BE0014-1

Betty Carter chronology
I'm Yours, You're Mine (1997)	The Music Never Stops (2019)	Live at De Werf, Bruges, 1989 (2020)

The Music Never Stops is a live album by the American jazz singer Betty Carter. Featuring a blend of original material and standards, it was recorded on March 29, 1992, at Aaron Davis Hall in New York City, as part of one of Jazz at Lincoln Center's earliest seasons. On the album, which was issued by Blue Engine Records in 2019, Carter is accompanied by a variety of ensembles, ranging from small groups to a big band and a string section. The recording marked the first posthumous release of previously unheard music by Carter, and arrived 22 years after her previous release.

Carter had received an NEA Jazz Master fellowship in 1992, and used part of the honorarium to fund the concert. She designed the program and stage layout in such a way that all the musicians were on stage during the entire concert, allowing her to segue between ensembles without pausing. Wynton Marsalis, the artistic director of Jazz at Lincoln Center, recalled: "She assembled three trios and a big band on a single stage and darted among the different ensembles, transitioning seamlessly and effortlessly between burning bebop, deeply felt ballads and original material for which there is no description. She wore these musicians out with her stamina."

== Reception ==
In an article for NPR, Nate Chinen described Carter as "adroit and unsurpassable" and called the performance "a concert of grand, unabashed ambition, celebrating Carter's magnificent prowess."

Steve Elman of The Arts Fuse wrote: "the sum of the parts here is much greater than the realization of any individual tune. The concert gains emotional momentum as it goes along, with unforgettable results... hearing those 76 minutes brought Betty Carter back to life for me, if only for a tiny slice of time."

The Columbia Daily Tribune's Jon W. Poses called the album "pure gold" and "exhilarating," and stated that it "reminds us just how special Carter was, a standard-bearer and caretaker of jazz." He commented: "The material here carries the listener, creating a dynamic, fluid, energetic, soulful groove from start to finish... The Music Never Stops serves as a delicious sampler of both Carter's organizational skills as well as her total musicianship."

Writing for All About Jazz, Marc Myers noted that "Carter isn't to everyone's taste," but remarked: "once your ear adjusts to her voice-as-an-instrument approach, you come to realize that she had a beautiful tone and that each song was remarkably re-invented."

Writer Raul Da Gama stated: "Throughout Miss Carter is dazzling and always gives notice that she needs no accompaniment because she could – on a dime – supplant every instrument in the string section, the big band or the small ensembles... she sculpts each phrase and teases out the long inventions of lines... giving new meaning and deep emotion to each song like no one but Betty Carter can and ever did and like no one has done since."

In a New York Times review of the previous evening's presentation of the same material, Stephen Holden wrote: "The idea of musical continuity gave the evening a natural sense of thematic ebb and flow... No matter how far Ms. Carter strays from a familiar melody, she maintains a firm hold on the emotional sense of a lyric... she projects a mournful acceptance of life's changes -- grief that is offset by an even stronger assertion of resilience."

== Track listing ==
Track timings not provided.

1. "Ms. B.C." (Pamela Watson)
2. "Make It Last" (Dick Haymes)
3. "30 Years" (Betty Carter)
4. "Why Him?" (Burton Lane, Alan Jay Lerner / "Where or When" (Richard Rodgers, Lorenz Hart) / "What's New?" (Bob Haggart, Johnny Burke)
5. "Tight!" (Betty Carter) / "Mr. Gentleman" (Betty Carter)
6. "Social Call" (Gigi Gryce, Jon Hendricks)
7. "Moonlight in Vermont" (John Blackburn, Karl Suessdorf)
8. "The Good Life" (John Blackburn / Karl Suessdorf)
9. "Bridges" (Betty Carter)
10. "If I Should Lose You" (Leo Robin, Ralph Rainger)
11. "Most Gentlemen Don't Like Love" (Cole Porter)
12. "Make Him Believe" (Betty Carter)
13. "Frenesi" (Alberto Dominguez, Leonard Whitcap)

== Personnel ==
- Betty Carter – vocals (tracks 2–13)
- Cyrus Chestnut – piano (tracks 3–5, 8, 9, 11, 12)
- Geri Allen – piano (track 10)
- Ariel Roland – double bass (tracks 3–5, 8, 9, 11)
- Greg Hutchinson – drums (tracks 3–7)
- Clarence Penn – drums (tracks 8, 9, 11)

Strings (tracks 2, 12)

- Geri Allen – conductor (track 12)
- Jeanne LeBlanc – cello
- Akua Dixon – cello
- Julie Green – cello
- Bruce Wang – cello
- John Beal – double bass
- Dave Finck – double bass

Big band (tracks 1, 2, 6, 7, 13)

- Jerry Dodgion – alto saxophone
- Rick Wald – alto saxophone
- Alex Foster – tenor saxophone
- Lou Marini – tenor saxophone
- Joe Temperley – baritone saxophone
- Lew Soloff – trumpet
- Earl Gardner – trumpet
- Ron Tooley – trumpet
- Kamau Adilifu – trumpet
- Art Baron – trombone
- Robin Eubanks – trombone
- Joe Randazzo – trombone
- John Hicks – piano
- Lisle Atkinson – double bass
- Kenny Washington – drums
