= Out There (Betty Carter album) =

Studio album by Betty Carter
- Released: 1958
- Recorded: February 1958; New York City, U.S.A.
- Genre: Jazz, bebop
- Length: 32:00
- Label: Peacock PLP 90
- Producer: Esmond Edwards

Betty Carter chronology
Social Call (1980)	Out There (1958)	The Modern Sound of Betty Carter (1960)

Professional ratings
Review scores
Source	Rating
The Penguin Guide to Jazz Recordings	3/4 stars

Out There (also listed as Out There with Betty Carter) is a bebop album by jazz vocalist Betty Carter with an ensemble under the direction of alto saxophonist Gigi Gryce. The arrangements were provided by Gryce, Ray Copeland, Melba Liston, Benny Golson and Tommy Bryce. The album was produced by Esmond Edwards and released 1958 on Peacock Records. Ron Wynn of Allmusic called the album "a dynamic set."

All the tracks from Out There were reissued on the 1992 Impulse!/GRP compilation album I Can't Help It. The album Out There as such was also reissued in 2005 in France on Blue Moon Records.

== Tracks ==
1. “You're Driving Me Crazy” (Walter Donaldson) – 1:45
2. “I Can't Help It” (Betty Carter) – 2:44
3. “By the Bend of the River” (Clara Edwards) – 2:07
4. “Babe's Blues” (Randy Weston, Jon Hendricks) – 2:49
5. “Foul Play” (Norman Mapp) – 2:21
6. “You're Getting to Be a Habit with Me” (Al Dubin, Harry Warren) – 3:30
7. “On the Isle of May” (Mack David, André Kostelanetz) – 2:02
8. “But Beautiful” (Jimmy Van Heusen, Sonny Burke) – 3:58
9. “All I've Got” (David Cole) – 2:15
10. “Make It Last” (Bob Haymes, Glenn G. Paxton) – 4:30
11. “Blue Bird of Happiness” (Edward Heyman, Sandor Harmati) – 1:30
12. “Something Wonderful” (Richard Rodgers, Oscar Hammerstein II) – 3:35

== Personnel ==
- Betty Carter - vocals
- Gigi Gryce - alto saxophone, arranger
- Ray Copeland - trumpet
- Kenny Dorham - trumpet (#1–6)
- Melba Liston - trombone
- Jimmy Powell - alto saxophone (#1–6)
- Benny Golson - tenor saxophone (#1–6)
- Sahib Shihab - baritone saxophone (#1–6)
- Jerome Richardson - tenor saxophone, flute, bassoon (#7–12)
- Wynton Kelly - piano
- Sam Jones - double bass (#1, 3–6)
- Peck Morrison - double bass (# 2, 7–12)
- Specs Wright - drums
