= Sound Project =

Studio album by Joe Pass and Tommy Gumina
- Released: June 16, 1987
- Studio: Amigo Studios, Hollywood
- Genre: Jazz
- Length: 43:40
- Label: Polytone
- Producer: Joe Pass and Tommy Gumina

Joe Pass chronology
Easy Living (1986)	Sound Project (1987)	Blues for Fred (1988)

Sound Project is an album by jazz guitarist Joe Pass and accordionist Tommy Gumina that was released in 1987.

== Background ==
Pass and Gumina met in the 1960s when Gumina built Pass a small, portable amp. Although Gumina started his career as a musician, he entered the electronics business and made instruments. He recorded Sound Project with one of his inventions, a polycorus, which is similar to an accordion. He and Pass started the record label Polytone Records after Pablo Records, Pass's label, was sold.

== Reception ==
Professional ratings
Review scores
Source	Rating
Allmusic	3/5 stars

Writing for Allmusic, music critic Ken Dryden wrote of the album "While it may not be a top priority to acquire, it's worth buying, if you can find it."

== Track listing ==
1. "My Shining Hour" (Harold Arlen, Johnny Mercer)
2. "My Ship" (Kurt Weill, Ira Gershwin)
3. "Once in a While" (Michael Edwards, Bud Green)
4. "Cavaquino"
5. "In the Wee Small Hours of the Morning" (Bob Hilliard, David Mann)
6. "Secret Love" (Sammy Fain, Paul Francis Webster)
7. "I'm Getting Sentimental Over You" (Ned Washington, George Bassman)
8. "When You Wish upon a Star" (Leigh Harline, Washington)
9. "About Time"
10. "Will You Give Me These"
11. "Guess I'll Hang My Tears Out to Dry" (Jule Styne, Sammy Cahn)

== Personnel ==
- Joe Pass – guitar
- Tommy Gumina – polycorus (accordion)
- Jimmie Smith – drums
