= Meet Betty Carter and Ray Bryant =

Studio album by Betty Carter and Ray Bryant
- Released: 1955
- Recorded: May 13, 1955
- Genre: Jazz
- Length: 57:27
- Label: Columbia
- Producer: Sid Feller

Betty Carter and Ray Bryant chronology
Meet Betty Carter and Ray Bryant (1955)	Social Call (1956)

Ray Bryant chronology
Meet Betty Carter and Ray Bryant (1955) (1955)	Ray Bryant Trio (1956)

Professional ratings
Review scores
Source	Rating
Allmusic	link
Encyclopedia of Popular Music	5/5 stars
The Penguin Guide to Jazz Recordings	3/4 stars

Meet Betty Carter and Ray Bryant is a 1955 jazz album by singer Betty Carter and pianist Ray Bryant both debuting here on record as leading artists. Although Carter is mentioned first, she is only featured on half of the tracks. On three of the six songs Jerome Richardson is also heard on flute. The other half is recorded by the Ray Bryant Trio alone.

The six tracks with Betty Carter were reissued under her name in 1980 on the compilation album Social Call together with previously unreleased material from a 1956 recording session with Gigi Gryce.

== Track listing (original LP release) ==
1. "Sneaking Around" (Ray Bryant) – 3:16
2. "Moonlight in Vermont" (John Blackburn, Karl Suessdorf) – 3:23
3. "What Is This Thing Called Love?" (Cole Porter) – 2:52
4. "Thou Swell" (Lorenz Hart, Richard Rodgers) – 1:40
5. "Willow Weep for Me" (Ann Ronell) – 3:34
6. "I Could Write a Book" (Hart, Rodgers) – 2:37
7. "Threesome" (Ray Bryant) – 2:44
8. "Gone with the Wind" (Herbert Magidson, Allie Wrubel) – 4:10
9. "Old Devil Moon" (Yip Harburg, Burton Lane) – 3:59
10. "The Way You Look Tonight" (Dorothy Fields, Jerome Kern) – 2:41
11. "No Moon at All" (Redd Evans, David Mann) – 2:51
12. "Can't We Be Friends?" (Paul James, Kay Swift) – 2:25

== Track listing (1996 CD reissue with bonus tracks) ==
1. "Let's Fall in Love" (Harold Arlen, Ted Koehler) – 1:58
2. "Social Call" (Gigi Gryce, Jon Hendricks) – 2:37
3. "Runaway" (Cy Coleman, Peggy Lee) – 2:28
4. "Frenesi" (Alberto Dominguez, Leonard Whitcup) – 2:31
5. "Moonlight in Vermont" (John Blackburn, Karl Suessdorf) – 3:23
6. "Thou Swell" (Lorenz Hart, Richard Rodgers) – 1:40
7. "I Could Write a Book" (Hart, Rodgers) – 2:37
8. "Gone with the Wind" (Herbert Magidson, Allie Wrubel) – 4:10
9. "The Way You Look Tonight" (Dorothy Fields, Jerome Kern) – 2:41
10. "Tell Him I Said Hello" (Jack J. Canning, Bill Hagner) – 2:32
11. "Can't We Be Friends?" (Paul James, Kay Swift) – 2:25
12. "Sneaking Around" (Ray Bryant) – 3:16
13. "Old Devil Moon" (Yip Harburg, Burton Lane) – 3:59
14. "Willow Weep for Me" (Ann Ronell) – 3:34
15. "What Is This Thing Called Love?" (Cole Porter) – 2:52
16. "Threesome" (Ray Bryant) – 2:44
17. "No Moon at All" (Dave Evans, Redd Mann) – 2:51
18. "Bryant's Folly" (Bryant) – 4:49
19. "Get Happy" (Arlen, Koehler) – 4:20

== Personnel ==
Recorded May 13, 1955, New York City, New York, USA:

- Betty Carter - vocals
- Ray Bryant - piano
- Jerome Richardson - flute (on tracks 6, 9, 11)
- Wendell Marshall - double bass
- Philly Joe Jones (or possibly Jo Jones, personnel listings are inconsistent) - drums
