= Girl Talk (Neal Hefti song) =

1965 song performed by Julie London

"Girl Talk" is a popular song composed by Neal Hefti, with lyrics written by Bobby Troup. It was written for the 1965 film Harlow, a biographical film about Jean Harlow, starring Carroll Baker.

== Background ==
The song has been described by Michael Feinstein as the "last great male chauvinistic song written in the '60s".

== Partial list of recordings ==
- Julie London, Feeling Good (1965) (wife of lyricist Bobby Troup)
- Tony Bennett, The Movie Song Album (1966)
- Sérgio Mendes, The Great Arrival (1966) (instrumental version)
- Harry James, The Ballads And The Beat! (Dot DLP 3669 and DLP 25669, 1966)
- The Kenny Burrell Quartet, The Tender Gender (1966)
- Chris Montez, Foolin' Around (1967)
- Richard "Groove" Holmes, Soul Power! (1967)
- Oscar Peterson, Girl Talk (1968)
- Betty Carter, Finally, Betty Carter (1969), Betty Carter at the Village Vanguard (1970)
- Herb Alpert & The Tijuana Brass, Warm (1969)
- Claude Nougaro, "Dansez sur moi (Girl Talk)", Locomotive d'or (1973)
- The King's Singers, Out of the Blue (1974) (choral arrangement by Patrick Gowers)
- Greg Phillinganes, Significant Gains (1981)
- Ella Fitzgerald, Joe Pass, Speak Love (1983)
- Johnny Griffin & Clémentine Continent Bleu (1987)
- Holly Cole, Girl Talk (1990)
- Mel Tormé and Cleo Laine - Nothing Without You (1992)
- The Four Freshmen, Live at Butler University (with Stan Kenton and His Orchestra), Telarc (1996)
- Billy May, Ultra Lounge: Vol. 16 Mondo Hollywood (1997)
- Vanessa Rubin, Girl Talk, Telarc (2001)
- Ernie Andrews, Girl Talk, High Note (2001)
- Frank Sinatra Jr., Steve Tyrell, ''That Face!'' (2006)
- Eliane Elias, I Thought About You (2013)
- Esperanza Spalding & Fred Hersch, Alive at the Village Vanguard (2023)
