= The Modern Sound of Betty Carter =

Studio album by Betty Carter
- Released: 1960
- Recorded: August 18–30, 1960
- Genre: Jazz
- Length: 57:27
- Label: ABC
- Producer: Richard Wess

Betty Carter chronology
Out There (1958)	The Modern Sound of Betty Carter (1960)	Ray Charles and Betty Carter (1961)

Professional ratings
Review scores
Source	Rating
Allmusic	4/5 stars

The Modern Sound of Betty Carter is a 1960 (see 1960 in music) album by Betty Carter.

The album has been available since 1992 on CD format as I Can't Help It on GRP Records' Impulse! label series (ASIN no. B000003N6D). (This CD includes songs from the 1958 Peacock LP Out There.)

== Track listing ==
1. "What a Little Moonlight Can Do" (Harry M. Woods) – 2:06
2. "There's No You" (Tom Adair, George Durgom, Hal Hopper) – 3:11
3. "I Don't Want to Set the World on Fire" (Bennie Benjamin, Eddie Durham, Sol Marcus, Eddie Seiler) – 2:24
4. "Remember" (Irving Berlin) – 2:24
5. "My Reverie" (Larry Clinton) – 2:50
6. "Mean to Me" (Fred E. Ahlert, Roy Turk) – 2:06
7. "Don't Weep for the Lady" (Darshan Singh) – 3:02
8. "Jazz (Ain't Nothin' But Soul)" (Norman Mapp) – 1:58
9. "For You" (Joe Burke, Al Dubin) – 2:21
10. "Stormy Weather" (Harold Arlen, Ted Koehler) – 3:24
11. "At Sundown" (Walter Donaldson) – 2:44
12. "On the Alamo" (Isham Jones, Gus Kahn) – 1:56

== Personnel ==
Recorded August 18–30, 1960, New York City, New York, USA:

- Betty Carter - vocals
- Richard Wess - arranger, conductor
