= Grammy Award for Best Jazz Vocal Performance, Female =

Honor presented to female recording artists for quality jazz vocal performances

- Awarded for: Quality female jazz vocal performances
- Country: United States
- Presented by: National Academy of Recording Arts and Sciences
- First award: 1981
- Final award: 1991
- Website: grammy.com

The Grammy Award for Best Jazz Vocal Performance, Female was an honor presented at the Grammy Awards, a ceremony that was established in 1958 and originally called the Gramophone Awards, to female recording artists for quality jazz vocal performances (songs or albums). Honors in several categories are presented at the ceremony annually by the National Academy of Recording Arts and Sciences of the United States to "honor artistic achievement, technical proficiency and overall excellence in the recording industry, without regard to album sales or chart position".

Prior to 1981, the gender-neutral category of Best Jazz Vocal Performance existed. The first award specifically for female performances was presented to Ella Fitzgerald in 1981 for the album A Perfect Match. The category remained unchanged until 1985, when it was combined with the award for Best Jazz Vocal Performance, Male and presented in the genderless category. Gender-specific awards were once again presented from 1986 until 1991. In 1992, the two categories were combined and presented as the category Best Jazz Vocal Performance. This category was later renamed to Best Jazz Vocal Album beginning in 2001. While the gender-specific award has not been presented since the category merge in 1992, an official confirmation of its retirement has not been announced.

Fitzgerald holds the record for the most wins in this category, with four. Diane Schuur is the only other artist to receive the award more than once, with two consecutive wins. American artists have been presented with the award more than any other nationality, though it has been presented to a vocalist from the United Kingdom once. Betty Carter and Maxine Sullivan share the record for the most nominations without a win, with three each.

== Recipients ==
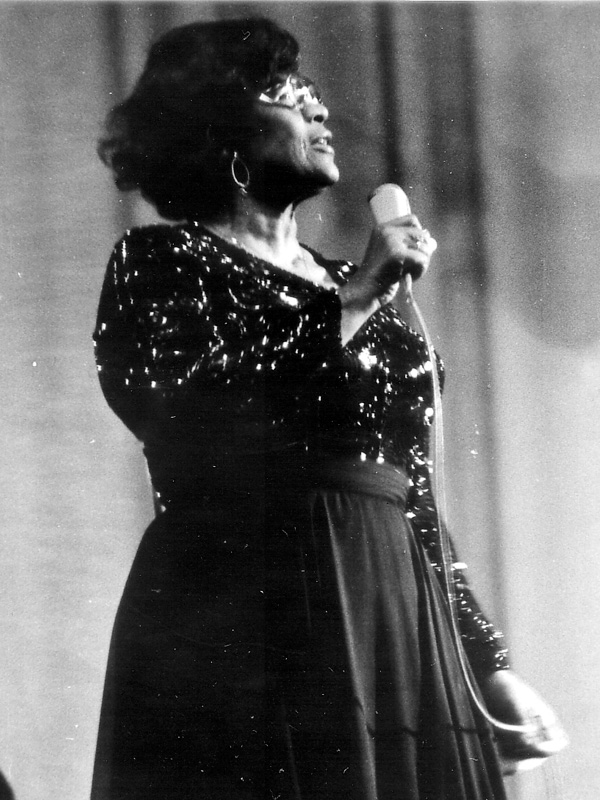
Four-time award winner Ella Fitzgerald performing in 1975

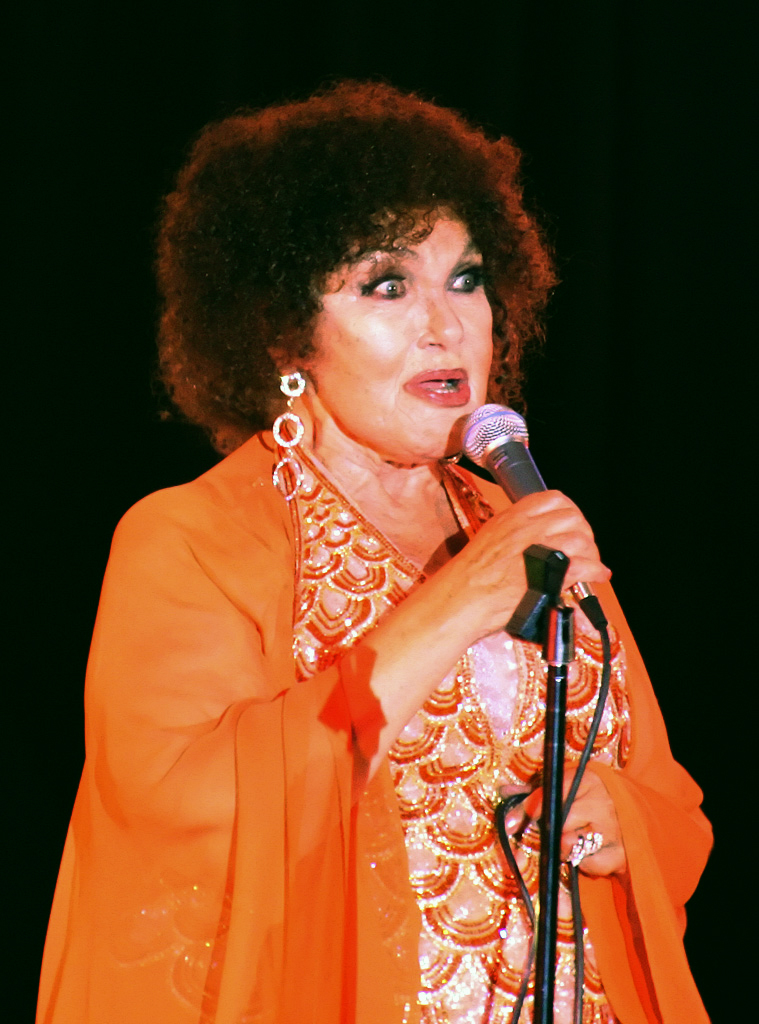
1986 award winner Cleo Laine

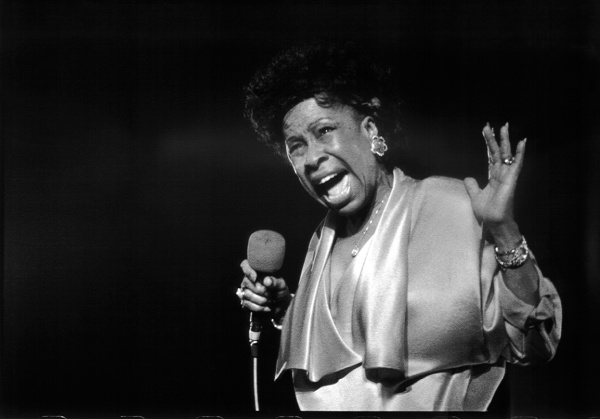
1989 award winner Betty Carter performing in 1986

Year^{[I]}	Performing artist(s)	Work	Nominees	Ref.
1981	Ella Fitzgerald	A Perfect Match	Betty Carter – The Audience with Betty Carter; Helen Humes – Helen Humes and the Muse All Stars; Helen Merrill – Chasin' the Bird; Sarah Vaughan – The Duke Ellington Songbook, Vol. 1	
1982	Ella Fitzgerald	Digital III at Montreux	Ernestine Anderson – Never Make Your Move Too Soon; Helen Humes – Helen; Etta Jones – Save Your Love for Me; Janet Lawson – The Janet Lawson Quintet	
1983	Sarah Vaughan	Gershwin Live!	Ella Fitzgerald – A Classy Pair; Chaka Khan – Echoes of an Era; Cleo Laine – Smilin' Through; Maxine Sullivan – Maxine Sullivan with the Ike Isaacs Quartet	
1984	Ella Fitzgerald	The Best Is Yet to Come	Ernestine Anderson – Big City; Betty Carter – Whatever Happened to Love?; Sue Raney – Sue Raney Sings the Music of Johnny Mandel; Sarah Vaughan – Crazy and Mixed Up	
1985^{[II]}	—	—	—	
1986	Cleo Laine	Cleo at Carnegie: The 10th Anniversary Concert	Cheryl Bentyne – Meet Benny Bailey; Tania Maria – Made in New York; Flora Purim – "20 Years Blue"; Janis Siegel – Sing Joy Spring; Maxine Sullivan – The Great Songs from the Cotton Club	
1987	Diane Schuur	Timeless	Etta James – Blues in the Night, Volume 1: The Early Show; Flora Purim – "Esquinas"; Sue Raney – Flight of Fancy; Maxine Sullivan – Uptown	
1988	Diane Schuur	Diane Schuur & the Count Basie Orchestra	Ella Fitzgerald – Easy Living; Carmen McRae – Any Old Time; Janis Siegel – At Home; Sarah Vaughan – Brazilian Romance	
1989	Betty Carter	Look What I Got!	Lena Horne – The Men in My Life; Rickie Lee Jones – "Autumn Leaves"; Peggy Lee – Miss Peggy Lee Sings the Blues; Carmen McRae – Fine and Mellow	
1990	Ruth Brown	Blues on Broadway	Dee Dee Bridgewater – Live in Paris; Anita O'Day – In a Mellow Tone; Diane Schuur – "The Christmas Song"; Janis Siegel – Short Stories	
1991	Ella Fitzgerald	All That Jazz	Betty Carter – Droppin' Things; Peggy Lee – The Peggy Lee Songbook: There'll Be Another Spring; Carmen McRae – Carmen Sings Monk; Dianne Reeves – "I Got It Bad and Ain't That Good"	

^{^[I]} Each year is linked to the article about the Grammy Awards held that year.
^{^[II]} Award was combined with the Best Jazz Vocal Performance, Male category and presented in a genderless category known as Best Jazz Vocal Album.

== See also ==
- Grammy Award for Best Jazz Vocal Performance, Duo or Group
- List of music awards honoring women
