= Open the Door (Betty Carter song) =

"Open the Door" is a popular song written by Betty Carter in 1964. Carter recorded it several times and made it a frequent part of her live performances, to the extent that it became her signature song. It has also been performed and recorded by other singers including Elsa Hedberg.

Carter's biographer William R. Bauer wrote of "Open the Door":

The song's persistent bossa nova rhythm and its haunting, sensual melody make it easy to hear the lyrics as a sexy come-on. But in such phrases as "I must get in your heart" and "No matter how you try to avoid me you can't get away so easily," hints of aggressiveness surface, suggesting that, although the narrator seems to be offering herself, she is in fact seeking her lover's surrender. Her sexuality becomes a means of obtaining control over the object of her desire and making him accept her as she is.

Carter's original 1964 recording of "Open the Door" was included on the soundtrack of the 1999 film American Beauty.

== Recordings ==
- Inside Betty Carter (1964)
- Now It's My Turn (1976)
- The Audience with Betty Carter (1979)
- Whatever Happened to Love? (1982) - a wordless rendition under the title "Abre la Puerta"
- Droppin' Things (1990) - under the title "Open the Door '90"
- Jex Saarelaht and Kate Ceberano on their album Open the Door - Live at Mietta's (1992).
