= I Can't Help It =

I Can't Help It may refer to:

- I Can’t Help It (film), an upcoming film based on the novel The Ax by Donald Westlake (English title: No Other Choice)
- I Can't Help It (album), a 1992 compilation album by Betty Carter
- I Can't Help It (If I'm Still in Love with You), a country song, originally by Hank Williams
- "I Can't Help It" (Andy Gibb and Olivia Newton-John song)
- "I Can't Help It" (Bananarama song)
- "I Can't Help It" (Michael Jackson song)
- "I Can't Help It" (T.I. song)
- "I Can't Help It", a song by Buddy Miller featuring Emmylou Harris from Poison Love, 1997
