= Can't We Be Friends? =

1929 song with lyrics by Paul James and music by Kay Swift

Sheet music, 1929

"Can't We Be Friends?" is a 1929 song with lyrics by Paul James and music by Kay Swift, introduced on Broadway in The Little Show by Libby Holman. It was later recorded by many artists including Bing Crosby, Ella Fitzgerald, and Frank Sinatra.

== Recordings ==
- Red Nichols & his Five Pennies (recorded 9/6/1929 and released on Brunswick 4510).
- Ray Ventura & his Collegians (recorded 10/19/1929)
- Smith Ballew (recorded 11/11/1929, and released on Okeh 41304).
- The Georgians (recorded 11/22/1929)
- Bing Crosby (recorded 9/27/1929, and released on Columbia 2001-D)
- Libby Holman (recorded September, 1929 and released on Brunswick 4506).
- Sam Wooding & his Chocolate Kiddies (recorded 12/1929)
- The Imperial Dance Orchestra (1929)
- Al Bowlly with Ray Noble & his Orchestra (recorded 1/16/1931 and released on Decca F2220) (Al Bowlly Discography)
- Benny Goodman (1937, Victor 25621)
- Bob Crosby's Bobcats (1938, Decca)
- John Kirby (1941, Columbia 35920)
- Muggsy Spanier (1942, Decca 4168)
- Mildred Bailey with the Ellis Larkins Trio (1948, Majestic 1209)
- Jess Stacy (1950, Capitol 1136)
- Herman Chittison (Keyboard Capers album, 1950)
- Frank Sinatra (In the Wee Small Hours album, 1955) (recorded February 8, 1955, with orchestra conducted by Nelson Riddle)
- Betty Carter (Meet Betty Carter and Ray Bryant album, 1956)
- Illinois Jacquet (Swing's the Thing album, 1956)
- Gene Ammons (The Happy Blues album, 1956)
- Ella Fitzgerald & Louis Armstrong (Ella and Louis album, 1956)
- Jane Powell (Can't We Be Friends album, 1956)
- Anita O'Day - included in her album Incomparable! (1960).
- Sammy Davis Jr. (The Wham of Sam album, 1961)
- Linda Ronstadt (Lush Life album, 1984)
- Jamie Cullum (Twentysomething album, 2003)
- Seth MacFarlane (Once in a While album, 2019)
- Vincent Lopez & his Orchestra
- Leo Reisman & his Orchestra
- Art Tatum

== Movie usage ==
- The Man I Love (1947) Played when Joey finds Gloria in the room and Petey sees San at the bar.
- Flamingo Road (1949) Played at the Eagle cafe when Lane gets hired
- Backfire (1950) Played when Steve, Bonnie and Lysa arrive at the party
- Young Man with a Horn (1950) featured Harry James dubbing "Can't We Be Friends" for Kirk Douglas'character
- Starlift (1951) Played twice at the cafeteria
- Bonnie & Clyde (1967) featured a scored version by Charles Strouse in the background of one scene
- Torch Song Trilogy (1998) featured Anita O'Day's version
- Get Him to the Greek (2010) featured a version by the Pete Jolly Trio

== See also ==
- List of 1920s jazz standards
