= Rodney Lancaster =

American jazz musician

Rodney Lancaster is a jazz musician from St. Louis, Missouri. Rodney has appeared in the New York Times Magazine with Betty Carter's group, Jazz Ahead in an article featuring up and coming young jazz musicians chosen by Ms. Carter called, The Next Miles Davis May Be On This Page. He is also known for his doctoral dissertation on jazz musician, J. J. Johnson and appearing as guest soloist/adjudicator at various jazz festivals.
