= At Sundown (When Love Is Calling Me Home) =

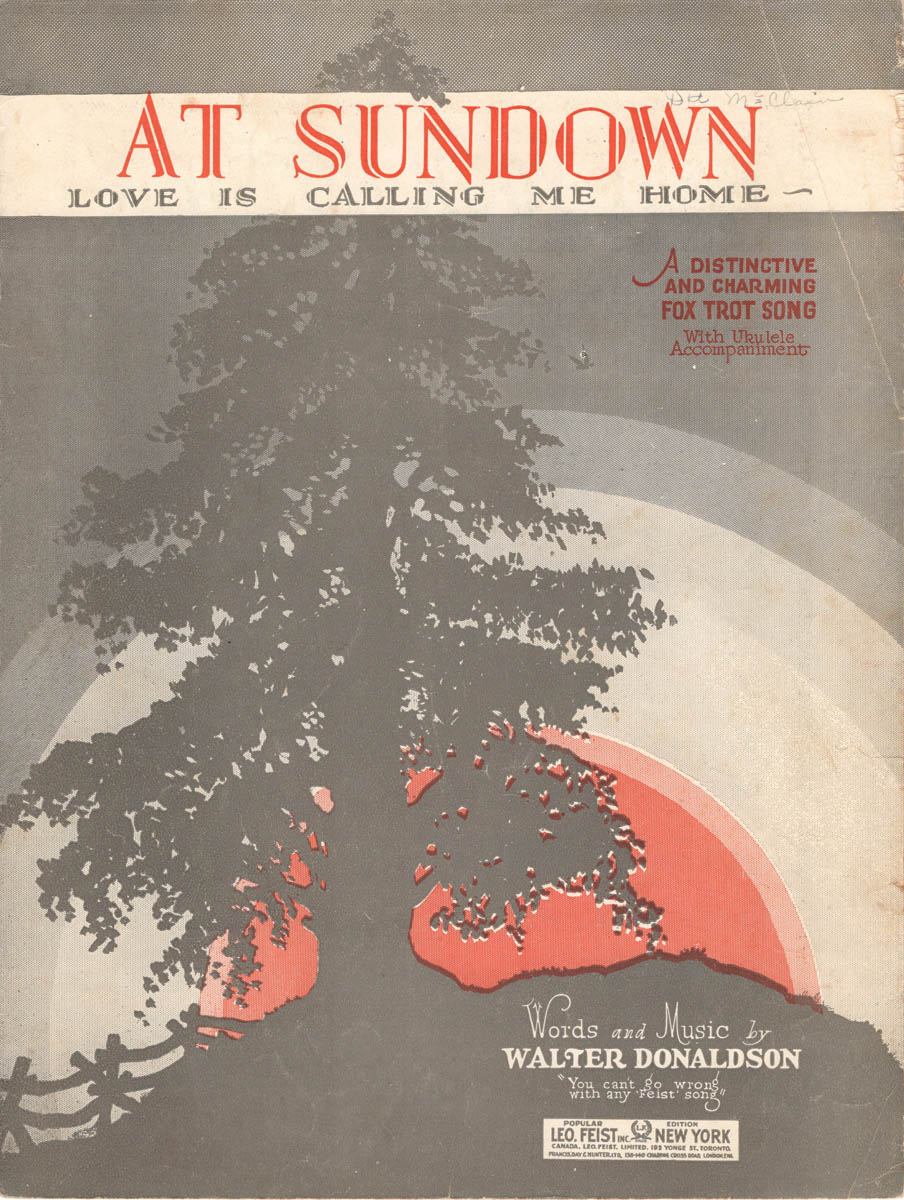
- Sheet music cover, 1927

Song
- Language: English
- Published: 1927
- Songwriter(s): Walter Donaldson

"At Sundown (When Love Is Calling Me Home)" is a foxtrot-style song written by Walter Donaldson. The song was published in 1927 by Leo Feist, Inc. in New York City. This hit song reportedly sold more than two million disks in various versions in the late 1920s. It has been used in several movie musicals including Glorifying the American Girl, This Is the Life, Music for Millions, Margie, The Fabulous Dorseys, Love Me or Leave Me, and The Joker Is Wild.

The sheet music can be found at the Pritzker Military Museum & Library.

== Notable recordings ==
- Ruth Etting accompanied by Rube Bloom recorded on June 27, 1927, and released on Columbia 1052-D.
- George Olsen & his Orchestra (with vocal by Fran Frey, Bob Borger and Bob Rice) recorded on February 4, 1927, and released on Victor 20476.
- Artie Shaw and His Orchestra Live recording from the Old Gold radio show January 29, 1939. Jerry Gray arrangement.
- Tommy Dorsey and His Orchestra, October 1, 1946, RCA Bluebird
- Mildred Bailey (1947)
- Gene Autry (1947)
- Betty Carter - for her The Modern Sound of Betty Carter (1960)
- Bing Crosby – recorded the song for his radio show in 1957 and it was subsequently released on CD.
- Dean Martin – for his album Sittin' on Top of the World (1973).
- Rosemary Clooney on her album Dedicated to Nelson (1996)
