= Dedicated to You (Ray Charles album) =

Studio album by Ray Charles
- Released: January 1961
- Recorded: August 23, 1960
- Genre: Soul
- Length: 39:11
- Label: ABC-Paramount Records
- Producer: Sid Feller

Ray Charles chronology
The Genius Hits the Road (1960)	Dedicated to You (1961)	Soul Meeting (1961)

Professional ratings
Review scores
Source	Rating
Allmusic	link

Dedicated to You is an album by Ray Charles, released in January 1961. It collects Charles's musical love notes to twelve women, by name.

A 1998 Rhino Records re-issue combined, on a single CD, Dedicated to You and Ray Charles and Betty Carter.

== Chart performance ==
The album debuted on Billboard magazine's Top LP's chart in the issue dated March 12, 1961, peaking at No. 11 during a thirty-nine-week run on the chart.

== Track listing ==
1. "Hardhearted Hannah" (Jack Yellen, Milton Ager, Charles Bates, Bob Bigelow) – 3:14
2. "Nancy (With the Laughing Face)" (Phil Silvers, Jimmy Van Heusen) – 3:02
3. "Margie" (Con Conrad, J. Russel Robinson, Benny Davis) – 2:44
4. "Ruby" (Mitchell Parish, Heinz Roemheld) – 3:51
5. "Rosetta" (Earl Hines, Henri Woode) – 2:29
6. "Stella by Starlight" (Ned Washington, Victor Young) – 3:47
7. "Cherry" (Ray Gilbert, Don Redman) – 3:37
8. "Josephine" (Burke Bivens, Kahn, Wayne King) – 2:14
9. "Candy" (Mack David, Alex Kramer, Joan Whitney) – 4:09
10. "Marie" (Irving Berlin) – 2:21
11. "Diane" (Lew Pollack, Erno Rapee) – 3:51
12. "Sweet Georgia Brown" (Ben Bernie, Kenneth Casey, Maceo Pinkard) – 2:30

== Personnel ==
- Betty Carter – vocals, performer
- Ray Charles – piano, keyboards, vocals
- Marty Paich – arrangements, conductor

== Charts ==
Chart (1961)	Peak position
US Billboard Top LPs (150 Best-Selling Monoraul LP's)	11
