= Bet-Car Records =

American record label

- Parent company: Verve Records
- Founded: 1970
- Founder: Betty Carter
- Defunct: 1987
- Genre: Jazz
- Country of origin: U.S.

Bet-Car Records was a record label founded by jazz singer Betty Carter in 1970 to release her own recordings after her negative experiences with other record companies. In 1983 Bet-Car also began to serve as her production and management company under the name Bet-Car Productions. Bet-Car maintained offices in houses that Carter and her family owned in Detroit and later in San Francisco.

The first album released on the Bet-Car label was the eponymous Betty Carter (reissued by Verve as Betty Carter at the Village Vanguard) with the catalog number MK 1001 (MK were the initials of her two sons, Myles and Kagle). Other albums originally released on Bet-Car as an independent record label include The Betty Carter Album, The Audience with Betty Carter, and Whatever Happened to Love?.

In 1987 Carter reached an agreement with Verve that gave her artistic control over future releases and that turned Bet-Car into an imprint of Verve. Her first Bet-Car release under Verve's auspices was Look What I Got!. Verve also issued her previous Bet-Car recordings on CD for the first time.

== See also ==
- List of record labels
- Betty Carter.org
