= Social Call =

A social call is an informal or friendly meeting or visit.

It may also refer to Social Call, a jazz standard composed by Gigi Gryce with lyrics by Jon Hendricks, and several music albums:

- Social Call (Betty Carter album) (compilation, 1980)
- Social Call (Charlie Rouse and Red Rodney album) (1984)
- Social Call (Houston Person album) (2003)
