= Nice Work If You Can Get It =

Nice Work If You Can Get It may refer to:

- "Nice Work If You Can Get It" (song), a 1937 popular standard by George and Ira Gershwin
- Nice Work If You Can Get It (album), a 1983 album by Ella Fitzgerald
- Nice Work If You Can Get It (musical), a 2012 Broadway musical with a score by George and Ira Gershwin
- "Nice Work If You Can Get It" (Goodnight Sweetheart), a 1995 television episode
