= I Can't Help It (album) =

Compilation album by Betty Carter
- Released: 1992
- Recorded: February 1958 – April 25, 1960
- Genre: Jazz
- Length: 63:36
- Label: Impulse!/GRP

Betty Carter chronology
Out There with Betty Carter (1958)	I Can't Help It (1992)	The Modern Sound of Betty Carter (1960)

Professional ratings
Review scores
Source	Rating
AllMusic	link
The Rolling Stone Jazz & Blues Album Guide	4/5 stars

I Can't Help It is a 1992 Betty Carter compilation album. It contains all of the tracks from her albums Out There with Betty Carter (Peacock Records, 1958) and The Modern Sound of Betty Carter (ABC-Paramount Records, 1960). The same combination of tracks had previously been released as a double LP by ABC Records under the title What a Little Moonlight Can Do.

The title track, "I Can't Help It", was the first of Carter's own compositions that she recorded.

== Track listing ==
1. "I Can't Help It" (Betty Carter) – 2:44
2. "By the Bend of the River" (Clara Edwards) – 2:07
3. "Babe's Blues" (Jon Hendricks, Randy Weston) – 2:49
4. "You're Getting to Be a Habit with Me" (Al Dubin, Harry Warren) – 2:30
5. "But Beautiful" (Sonny Burke, Jimmy Van Heusen) – 3:58
6. "All I Got" (David Cole) – 2:15
7. "You're Driving Me Crazy (What Did I Do?)" (Walter Donaldson) – 1:45
8. "Foul Play" (Norman Mapp) – 2:21
9. "On the Isle of May" (Mack David, André Kostelanetz) – 2:02
10. "Make It Last" (Dick Haymes, Bill Paxton) – 4:30
11. "The Bluebird of Happiness" (Sandor Harmati, Edward Heyman) – 1:30
12. "Something Wonderful" (Oscar Hammerstein II, Richard Rodgers) – 3:37
13. "For You" (Burke, Dubin) – 2:20
14. "What a Little Moonlight Can Do" (Harry M. Woods) – 2:04
15. "Remember" (Irving Berlin) – 2:24
16. "At Sundown" (Donaldson) – 2:42
17. "Mean to Me" (Fred E. Ahlert, Roy Turk) – 2:04
18. "I Don't Want to Set the World on Fire" (Bennie Benjamin, Eddie Durham, Sol Marcus, Eddie Seiler) – 2:22
19. "On the Alamo" (Isham Jones, Gus Kahn) – 1:55
20. "Jazz (Ain't Nothin' But Soul)" (Mapp) – 1:56
21. "There's No You" (Tom Adair, George Durgom, Hal Hopper) – 3:08
22. "Stormy Weather" (Harold Arlen, Ted Koehler) – 3:21
23. "My Reverie" (Larry Clinton, Claude Debussy) – 2:47
24. "Don't Weep for the Lady" (Darshan Singh) – 3:00

== Personnel ==
Recorded February 1958, New York City, New York, USA (tracks 1–6):

- Betty Carter – vocals
- Ray Copeland – trumpet, arranger
- Melba Liston – trombone, arranger
- Jerome Richardson – tenor saxophone, flute, bass clarinet
- Wynton Kelly – piano
- Peck Morrison – double bass
- Specs Wright – drums

Recorded February 1958, in New York City, New York, USA (tracks 7–12):

- Betty Carter – vocals
- Kenny Dorham, Ray Copeland – trumpets
- Melba Liston – trombone
- Gigi Gryce, Jimmy Powell – alto saxophones
- Benny Golson – tenor saxophone
- Sahib Shihab – baritone saxophone
- Wynton Kelly – piano
- Sam Jones – double bass

Arrangements by Copeland, Liston, Gryce, Golson & Tommy Bryce

Recorded August 18, 29, and 30, 1960, in New York City, New York, USA (tracks 13–24):

- Betty Carter – vocals
- Orchestra arranged and conducted by Richard Weiss
