= I'm Yours, You're Mine =

Studio album by Betty Carter
- Released: January 1997
- Recorded: January 14–25, 1996
- Studio: Power Station, New York City
- Genre: Vocal jazz
- Length: 53:56
- Label: Verve 559 623-2
- Producer: Betty Carter

Betty Carter chronology
Feed the Fire (1994)	I'm Yours, You're Mine (1997)	The Music Never Stops (2019)

I'm Yours, You're Mine is a 1997 studio album by the American jazz singer Betty Carter. Recorded in January 1996, this was the last album that Carter recorded before her death in September 1998.

I'm Yours, You're Mine peaked at 25 on the Billboard Top Jazz Albums chart.

The title track, written by Carter and bassist Curtis Lundy consists of "scat vocables," until the end of the tune, where Carter quotes the final lines from the song "What's New?"

== Reception ==
Professional ratings
Review scores
Source	Rating
Allmusic	4/5 stars
The Penguin Guide to Jazz Recordings	3/4 stars

Allmusic.com awarded I'm Yours, You're Mine four out of five stars, but did not review the album. Billboard positively reviewed the album upon its release, describing it as a "toned down and moodily evocative set" adding that "Carter's voice proves that it can turn phrases like no other on the title cut's wordless, gently delightful, downtempo meditation."

Howard Reich, writing in the Chicago Tribune said that "No doubt Betty Carter's singing is an acquired taste, but to those who have acquired it, she's a uniquely appealing artist. The elongated lines, exotic colors and unusual ornaments she brings to every cut on this recording...attest to the singular nature of Carter's singing."

Writing for All About Jazz, Tom Storer described the songs on I'm Yours, You're Mine as getting "typical Carter treatments...somehow managing to be both lush and lean. Unable or unwilling to try for the explosive dynamic contrasts and fiendish tempos that were once her forte, she has streamlined her phrasing, taking her playful way with rhythmic tricks to a calmer level and proving yet again her unwillingness to sing anybody's standard licks but her own." Storer reserved criticism for Carter's singing of the original Portuguese Brazilian lyrics to "Useless Landscape". Storer concluded his review by describing Carter's quote from "What's New?" as "different, surprisingly moving, but wholly unsentimental. That's Betty for you."

== Track listing ==
1. "This Time" (Jule Styne) – 7:43
2. "I'm Yours, You're Mine" (Betty Carter, Curtis Lundy) – 9:34
3. "Lonely House" (Langston Hughes, Kurt Weill) – 6:29
4. "Close Your Eyes" (Bernice Petkere) – 7:45
5. "Useless Landscape" (Aloysio de Oliveira, Ray Gilbert, Antonio Carlos Jobim) – 7:16
6. "East of the Sun (and West of the Moon)" (Brooks Bowman) – 4:50
7. "September Song" (Maxwell Anderson, Weill) – 10:19

== Personnel ==
Performance

- Betty Carter – vocals, producer
- Mark Shim – tenor saxophone
- Andre Hayward – trombone
- Xavier Davis – piano
- Curtis Lundy – double bass
- Matt Hughes – bass
- Gregory Hutchinson – drums

Production

- Joe Ferla – engineer
- Rory Romano – assistant engineer
- Ted Wohlsen
- Greg Calbi – mastering
- Anthony Barboza – photographer
