= The Betty Carter Album =

Studio album by Betty Carter
- Released: 1976
- Recorded: Before 1975
- Genre: Jazz
- Length: 39:44
- Label: Bet-Car MK 1002/Verve 835 682-2
- Producer: Betty Carter

Betty Carter chronology
Now It's My Turn (1976)	The Betty Carter Album (1976)	The Audience with Betty Carter (1979)

Professional ratings
Review scores
Source	Rating
Allmusic	3/5 stars
The Rolling Stone Jazz Record Guide	5/5 stars

The Betty Carter Album is a 1976 album by Betty Carter. It is unique among her albums in its use of overdubbing on some tracks to allow her to record multiple vocal lines. It was also her first album for which she wrote the majority of the songs herself.

The album was originally released on Carter's own Bet-Car label. It was first reissued on CD by Verve in 1988.

== Reception ==
The singer Bilal names it among his 25 favorite albums and one of the first jazz records he purchased, citing Carter's vocal stylings.

== Track listing ==
1. "You're a Sweetheart" (Harold Adamson, Jimmy McHugh) – 3:57
2. "I Can't Help It" (Betty Carter) – 2:45
3. "What is It?" (Carter) – 5:35
4. "On Our Way Up (Sister Candy)" (Freddie Roach) – 1:36
5. "We Tried" (Carter) – 5:53
6. "Happy" (Carter) – 2:08
7. "Sunday, Monday or Always" (Sonny Burke, Jimmy Van Heusen) – 4:19
8. "Tight" (Carter) – 1:36
9. "Children Learn What They Live" (Dorothy Law Nolt) – 4:16
10. "Sounds (Movin' On)" (Carter) – 7:17

== Personnel ==
- Betty Carter - vocals
- Danny Mixon - piano
- Onaje Allan Gumbs - piano (tracks 1, 3 and 7)
- Buster Williams - double bass
- Louis Hayes - drums
- Chip Lyle - drums (tracks 2, 8, 9 and 10)
