= Live at Long Beach City College =

Live album by Joe Pass
- Released: 1984
- Recorded: January 20, 1984
- Venue: Long Beach City College
- Genre: Jazz
- Length: 51:35
- Label: Pablo
- Producer: Norman Granz

Joe Pass chronology
Speak Love (1983)	Live at Long Beach City College (1984)	Whitestone (1985)

Alternative Cover
- Reissue cover, as Blues Dues

Live at Long Beach City College (reissued in 1998 as Blues Dues (Live at Long Beach City College)) is an album by jazz guitarist Joe Pass, recorded in 1984.

== Reception ==
Professional ratings
Review scores
Source	Rating
Allmusic	4/5 stars
The Rolling Stone Jazz Record Guide	3/5 stars
The Penguin Guide to Jazz Recordings	3/4 stars

Writing for Allmusic, music critic Scott Yanow wrote of the album "For this live date, Pass explores seven standards and a couple of original blues, but manages to find fresh variations to play during such songs as "Wave," "All the Things You Are," and an exploratory rendition of "Honeysuckle Rose.""

== Track listing ==
1. "Wave" (Antônio Carlos Jobim) – 5:52
2. "Blues in "G"" (Joe Pass) – 7:05
3. "All the Things You Are" (Oscar Hammerstein II, Jerome Kern) – 5:43
4. "'Round Midnight" (Thelonious Monk, Cootie Williams) – 6:26
5. "Here's That Rainy Day" (Johnny Burke, Jimmy Van Heusen) – 4:48
6. "Duke Ellington's Sophisticated Lady Melange" (Duke Ellington) – 6:37
7. "Blues Dues" (Pass) – 5:31
8. "Bluesette" (Norman Gimbel, Toots Thielemans) – 3:43
9. "Scrapple From The Apple" (Charlie Parker) – 5:50

== Personnel ==
- Joe Pass – guitar
