= It's Not About the Melody =

1992 studio album by Betty Carter

Studio album by Betty Carter
- Released: 1992
- Recorded: May 25–26, 1992, Clinton Recording Studios and Eastside Sound
- Genre: Vocal jazz
- Length: 71:34
- Label: Verve 314-513870-2
- Producer: Betty Carter

Betty Carter chronology
Droppin' Things (1990)	It's Not About the Melody (1992)	Feed the Fire (1994)

It's Not About the Melody is a 1992 studio album by the American jazz singer Betty Carter.

== Reception ==
Professional ratings
Review scores
Source	Rating
Allmusic	4/5 stars

The Allmusic review by Ron Wynn awarded the album four stars, and described Carter as "a vocal improviser in a manner few have equaled, and if her voice lacks the clarity and timbre of the all-time greats, she's more than compensated with incredible timing, flexibility and power."

== Track listing ==
No.	Title	Writer(s)	Length
1.	"Naima's Love Song"	Betty Carter, John Hicks	8:25
2.	"Stay as Sweet as You Are"	Mack Gordon, Harry Revel	7:11
3.	"Make Him Believe"	Carter	5:25
4.	"I Should Care"	Sammy Cahn, Axel Stordahl, Paul Weston	3:26
5.	"Once Upon a Summertime"	Eddie Barclay, Michel Legrand, Eddy Marnay, Johnny Mercer	5:58
6.	"You Go to My Head"	J. Fred Coots, Haven Gillespie	5:35
7.	"In the Still of the Night"	Cole Porter	4:07
8.	"When It's Sleepy Time Down South"	Clarence Muse, Leon René, Otis Rene	7:45
9.	"The Love We Had Yesterday"	Pat Watson	7:17
10.	"Dip Bag"	Carter	8:57
11.	"You're Mine You"	Johnny Green, Edward Heyman	7:12
Total length:			71:34

== Personnel ==
- Betty Carter - vocals
- Cyrus Chestnut - piano
- John Hicks - piano
- Mulgrew Miller - piano
- Craig Handy - tenor saxophone
- Walter Booker - double bass
- Christian McBride - bass
- Ariel J. Roland - bass
- Jeff "Tain" Watts - drums
- Lewis Nash - drums
- Clarence Penn - drums
