= Finally, Betty Carter =

Live album by Betty Carter
- Released: 1975
- Recorded: December 6, 1969, Judson Hall, New York City, New York, USA)
- Genre: Vocal jazz
- Length: 55:42 (reissue)
- Label: Roulette
- Producer: Alan Douglas

Betty Carter chronology
Betty Carter at the Village Vanguard (1970)	Finally, Betty Carter (1975)	Round Midnight (1975)

Professional ratings
Review scores
Source	Rating
Allmusic	3/5 stars
The Rolling Stone Jazz Record Guide	5/5 stars

Finally, Betty Carter is a live album by Betty Carter. Though it was recorded in 1969, its release was delayed until 1975 because the master recording was stolen. A second album of material recorded from the same concert, Round Midnight, was released the same year.

== Track listing ==
1. Medley: "Seems Like Old Times"/"I Remember You"/"Remember" (Johnny Mercer, Victor Schertzinger)/(Irving Berlin) - 8:25
2. "Blue Moon" (Lorenz Hart, Richard Rodgers) - 2:03
3. "The Sun Died" (Ray Charles, Hubert Giraud, Anne Gregory) - 5:29
4. "I Only Have Eyes for You" (Al Dubin, Harry Warren) - 2:27
5. Medley: "Body and Soul"/"Heart and Soul" (Edward Heyman, Robert Sour, Frank Eyton, Johnny Green) (Hoagy Carmichael, Frank Loesser) - 8:58
6. Medley: "I Didn't Know What Time It Was"/"All the Things You Are"/"I Could Write a Book" (Rodgers, Hart)/(Oscar Hammerstein II, Jerome Kern)/ (Rodgers, Hart) - 5:52
7. "Girl Talk" (Neal Hefti, Bobby Troup) - 5:46
8. "You're a Sweetheart" (Harold Adamson, Jimmy McHugh) - 4:40
9. "Ego" (Betty Carter, Randy Weston) - 3:23
10. "All Through the Day" (Hammerstein, Kern) - 8:39

== Personnel ==
Recorded December 6, 1969, Judson Hall, New York City, New York, USA

- Betty Carter - vocals
- Norman Simmons - piano
- Lisle Atkinson - bass
- Al Harewood - drums
