= Whitestone (album) =

Studio album by Joe Pass
- Released: 1985
- Recorded: February 28–March 1, 1985
- Studio: Studio Sound Records, Hollywood
- Genre: Jazz
- Length: 39:56
- Label: Pablo
- Producer: Bob Edmondson

Joe Pass chronology
Live at Long Beach City College (1984)	Whitestone (1985)	University of Akron Concert (1986)

Whitestone is an album by jazz guitarist Joe Pass that was released in 1985. It is his second Brazilian-pop influenced album after Tudo Bem! in 1978.

== Reception ==
Professional ratings
Review scores
Source	Rating
Allmusic	2.5/5 stars
The Penguin Guide to Jazz Recordings	2/4 stars

Writing for Allmusic, music critic Scott Yanow wrote of the album "The material is not as strong as Pass' earlier Brazilian set Tudo Bem... Pass sounds fine, but the overall results are not too substantial or memorable. A lesser effort."

== Track listing ==
1. "Light in Your Eyes" (Andy Narell) – 4:21
2. "Shuffle City" (Don Grusin) – 3:16
3. "Estaté" (Bruno Brighetti, Bruno Martino) – 3:39
4. "Daquilo Que Eu Sei" (Ivan Lins, Vitor Martins) – 4:18
5. "Whitestone" (Narell) – 4:23
6. "Lovin' Eyes" (Billy Tragesser) – 5:06
7. "Armanacer" (John Pisano) – 4:12
8. "I Can't Help It (If I'm Still in Love With You)" (Stevie Wonder, Susaye Greene) – 4:43
9. "Tarde" (Márcio Borges, Milton Nascimento) – 3:00
10. "Fleeting Moments" (Narell) – 3:31

== Personnel ==
- Joe Pass – guitar
- John Pisano – guitar
- Don Grusin – keyboards
- Nathan East – bass
- Abraham Laboriel – bass
- Harvey Mason – drums
- Paulinho Da Costa – percussion
- Armando Compean – vocals (on "Lovin' Eyes")
