= Whatever Happened to Love? =

1982 live album by Betty Carter

Live album by Betty Carter
- Released: 1982
- Recorded: 1982 at The Bottom Line, New York City
- Genre: Vocal jazz
- Length: 52:33
- Label: Bet-Car, Verve (reissue)
- Producer: Betty Carter

Betty Carter chronology
The Audience with Betty Carter (1979)	Whatever Happened to Love? (1982)	Look What I Got! (1988)

Professional ratings
Review scores
Source	Rating
Allmusic	3/5 stars
The Rolling Stone Jazz Record Guide	4/5 stars

Whatever Happened to Love? is a 1982 live album by the American jazz singer Betty Carter. It is her only live album to include a string section on some tracks.

"Abre la Puerta" is a wordless version of Carter's signature tune "Open the Door". Carter was nominated for the Grammy Award for Best Jazz Vocal Performance, Female at the 26th Annual Grammy Awards for her performance on this album.

== Track listing ==
1. "What a Little Moonlight Can Do" (Harry M. Woods) – 10:10
2. "Cocktails for Two" (Sam Coslow, Arthur Johnston) – 6:20
3. "Social Call" (Gigi Gryce) - 2:23
4. "Goodbye" (Gordon Jenkins) – 7:29
5. "With No Words" (Betty Carter) – 4:31
6. "New Blues (you Purrrrrrr)" (Carter) – 6:20
7. "I Cry Alone" (Burt Bacharach, Hal David) – 4:30
8. "Abre la Puerta" (Carter) – 7:05
9. "Ev'ry Time We Say Goodbye" (Porter) – 5:48

== Personnel ==
- Betty Carter – vocals
- Khalid Moss – piano
- Curtis Lundy – double bass
- Lewis Nash – drums
