= One for My Baby (Joe Pass album) =

Studio album by Joe Pass
- Released: 1988
- Recorded: 1988
- Studio: Group IV Recording Studios, Hollywood
- Genre: Jazz
- Length: 49:56
- Label: Pablo
- Producer: Eric Miller

Joe Pass chronology
Blues for Fred (1988)	One for My Baby (1988)	Summer Nights (1989)

One for My Baby is an album by jazz guitarist Joe Pass that was released in 1988. It was reissued on CD in 1992 by Pablo Records and in 1995 by Original Jazz Classics

== Reception ==
Professional ratings
Review scores
Source	Rating
Allmusic	3/5 stars
The Penguin Guide to Jazz Recordings	3/4 stars

Writing for Allmusic, music critic Ken Dryden wrote of the album "Two Pass originals are lengthy blues vehicles with plenty of solo space for all. "I Remember You" is an unlikely choice that developed from Wiggins' jamming in the studio; the ballad is a relaxing detour from the blues that dominate the CD. Joe Pass was without peer on guitar the last 20 years of his life; his playing here won't disappoint."

== Track listing ==
1. "Bluesology" (Milt Jackson) – 5:54
2. "One for My Baby (and One More for the Road)" (Harold Arlen, Johnny Mercer) – 4:48
3. "J. P. Blues" (Joe Pass) – 7:43
4. "Poinciana" (Nat Simon, Buddy Bernier) – 6:30
5. "I Don't Stand a Ghost of a Chance with You" (Bing Crosby, Ned Washington, Victor Young) – 6:00
6. "I Remember You" (Victor Schertzinger, Johnny Mercer) – 6:13
7. "Bay City Blues" (Pass) – 7:02
8. "The Song Is You" (Oscar Hammerstein II, Jerome Kern) – 5:46

== Personnel ==
- Joe Pass – guitar
- Plas Johnson – tenor saxophone
- Gerald Wiggins – piano, organ
- Andy Simpkins – bass
- Albert Heath – drums
