= Now It's My Turn (album) =

Studio album by Betty Carter
- Released: 1976
- Recorded: 1976
- Genre: Vocal jazz
- Length: 40:23
- Label: Roulette
- Producer: Betty Carter

Betty Carter chronology
Round Midnight (1975)	Now It's My Turn (1976)	The Betty Carter Album (1976)

Professional ratings
Review scores
Source	Rating
Allmusic	link
The Rolling Stone Jazz Record Guide	4/5 stars

Now It's My Turn is a 1976 album by American jazz singer Betty Carter.

== Track listing ==
1. "Music Maestro, Please"/"Swing Brother Swing" – 4:29
2. "I Was Telling Him About You" – 5:04
3. "Wagon Wheels" – 7:17
4. "New Blues (You Purr)" (Betty Carter) – 5:25
5. "Most Gentlemen Don't Like Love" (Cole Porter) – 3:03
6. "Making Dreams Come True" – 2:55
7. "Open the Door" (Carter) – 4:36
8. "Just Friends"/"Star Eyes" (John Klenner, Sam M. Lewis)/(Gene de Paul, Don Raye) – 4:35
9. "No More Words" – 7:04

== Personnel ==
Recorded March 9–10, June 21–22, 1976 at Sound Ideas Studio C :

- Betty Carter – vocals
- John Hicks – piano
- Walter Booker – bass
- Eddie Moore – drums

== Production ==
- Fred Bailin – producer
- Joe Ferla – recording engineer
