= Summer Nights (album) =

Studio album by Joe Pass
- Released: 1990
- Studios: Group IV Recording Studio, Hollywood, California
- Genre: Jazz
- Length: 47:55
- Label: Pablo
- Producer: Eric Miller

Joe Pass chronology
One for My Baby (1988)	Summer Nights (1990)	Appassionato (1991)

Summer Nights is an album by jazz guitarist Joe Pass, released in 1990.

== Reception ==
Professional ratings
Review scores
Source	Rating
AllMusic	4/5 stars
The Penguin Guide to Jazz Recordings	3/4 stars

AllMusic's Scott Yanow wrote: "Although Joe Pass' main influence was Charlie Christian and he really does not sound like Reinhardt, he manages to evoke the spirit of Django while swinging in his own fashion. It is particularly nice hearing such tunes as "Belleville," the haunting "Tears" and "For Django" in newer versions."

== Track listing ==
No.	Title	Writer(s)	Length
1.	"Summer Night"	Al Dubin, Harry Warren	4:20
2.	"Anouman"	Django Reinhardt	4:40
3.	"Douce Ambiance"	Reinhardt	4:52
4.	"For Django"	Pass	3:05
5.	"D-Joe"	John Pisano	3:09
6.	"I Got Rhythm"	George Gershwin, Ira Gershwin	4:41
7.	"E-Blue Eyes"	Pass	5:38
8.	"Belleville"	Reinhardt	3:57
9.	"(In My) Solitude"	Duke Ellington, Irving Mills, Eddie DeLange	3:26
10.	"Tears"	Reinhardt	4:48
11.	"In a Sentimental Mood"	Ellington, Mills, Manny Kurtz	2:51
12.	"Them There Eyes"	Maceo Pinkard, Doris Tauber, William Tracey	2:28

== Personnel ==
- Joe Pass – acoustic guitar and electric guitar
- John Pisano – acoustic guitar
- Jim Hughart – bass
- Colin Bailey – drums
