= Betty Carter at the Village Vanguard =

Live album by Betty Carter
- Released: 1970
- Recorded: May 22, 1970, at the Village Vanguard
- Genre: Vocal jazz
- Length: 40:23
- Label: Bet-Car/Verve
- Producer: Betty Carter

Betty Carter chronology
Inside Betty Carter (1964)	Betty Carter at the Village Vanguard (1970)	Finally, Betty Carter (1975)

Professional ratings
Review scores
Source	Rating
Allmusic	4/5 stars
The Rolling Stone Jazz Record Guide	5/5 stars

Betty Carter at the Village Vanguard (original title Betty Carter) is a 1970 live album by Betty Carter featuring her performing with her trio at the Village Vanguard. It was Carter's first live album to be released, and the first album issued on her own label, Bet-Car Records. Originally eponymously titled, it was given its present title for its 1993 release on CD by Verve Records.

The track listing and personnel on Betty Carter at the Village Vanguard is very similar to that of the album Finally, Betty Carter, which she recorded six months earlier. However, the original producer of Finally ran off with the master recording, and it remained unreleased until 1975. Carter released At the Village Vanguard on her own label to effectively supplant the stolen album in her discography. Despite the superficial similarities between the two albums, the more intimate setting and Carter's lively interplay with the audience give At the Village Vanguard a very different feel from Finally, which was recorded at the Judson Hall Theatre.

The song "Ego" uses the tune of Randy Weston's composition "Berkshire Blues" with Carter's own lyrics.

== Track listing ==
1. "By the Bend of the River" (Clara Edwards, Bernhard Haig) – 1:52
2. "Ego" (Randy Weston, Betty Carter) – 3:04
3. "Body and Soul" (Johnny Green, Frank Eyton, Edward Heyman, Robert Sour) – 5:21
4. "Heart and Soul" (Hoagy Carmichael, Frank Loesser) – 3:30
5. "The Surrey with the Fringe on Top" (Richard Rodgers, Oscar Hammerstein II) – 7:38
6. "Girl Talk" (Neal Hefti, Bobby Troup) – 4:20
7. "I Didn't Know What Time It Was" (Rodgers, Lorenz Hart) – 2:08
8. "All the Things You Are" (Jerome Kern, Hammerstein) – 0:59
9. "I Could Write a Book" (Rodgers, Hart) – 2:18
10. "The Sun Died" (Ray Charles, Hubert Giraud, Anne Gregory, Pierre LeRoye) – 5:31
11. "Please Do Something" (Carter) – 3:03

== Personnel ==
Recorded May 22, 1970, at the Village Vanguard, New York City, New York, USA

- Betty Carter – vocals
- Norman Simmons – piano
- Lisle Atkinson – bass
- Al Harewood – drums
