= 'Round Midnight (1963 Betty Carter album) =

Studio album by Betty Carter
- Released: 1963
- Recorded: August 10, 1962 – January 15, 1963
- Genre: Vocal jazz
- Length: 31:11
- Label: Atco
- Producer: Nesuhi Ertegün

Betty Carter chronology
Ray Charles and Betty Carter (1961)	'Round Midnight (1963)	Inside Betty Carter (1964)

'Round Midnight is a 1963 studio album by the American jazz singer Betty Carter that was arranged by Claus Ogerman and Oliver Nelson.

== Reception ==
Professional ratings
Review scores
Source	Rating
AllMusic	2.5/5 stars
The Rolling Stone Jazz Record Guide	4/5 stars
The Penguin Guide to Jazz Recordings	3/4 stars

Scott Yanow, writing for AllMusic gave 'Round Midnight two and a half stars out of five. Yanow commented of Carter in this period: "Her chance-taking style and unusual voice were mostly ignored and it would not be until the late '70s that she was finally 'discovered.' ...Her style was a lot freer than it had been in her earlier records but was still more accessible than it would be. Her repertoire" at the time "was already becoming eclectic."

Billboard gave 'Round Midnight its "4-star rating" in March 1963. The rating was given for "new albums with sufficient commercial potential."

== Track listings ==
No.	Title	Writer(s)	Length
1.	"Nothing More to Look Forward To"	Richard Adler	2:31
2.	"Who What Why Where When"	Betty Carter	3:05
3.	"Heart and Soul"	Frank Loesser, Hoagy Carmichael	3:14
4.	"Call Me Darling"	Dorothy Dick, Mort Fryberg, Rolf Marbet, Bert Reisfeld	3:48
5.	"When I Fall in Love"	Edward Heyman, Victor Young	2:56
6.	"'Round Midnight"	Bernie Hanighen, Cootie Williams, Thelonious Monk	3:14
7.	"I Wonder"	Cecil Gant, Raymond Leveen	2:29
8.	"Theme from Dr. Kildare (Three Stars Will Shine Tonight)"	Jerry Goldsmith, Pete Rugolo, Hal Winn	2:40
9.	"The Good Life"	Sacha Distel, Jack Reardon	2:30
10.	"Everybody's Somebody's Fool"	Ace Adams, Regina Adams, Lionel Hampton	2:40
11.	"Two Cigarettes in the Dark"	Lew Pollack, Paul Francis Webster	2:04
12.	"Shine On, Harvest Moon"	Nora Bayes, Jack Norworth	2:06
13.	"One Note Samba"	Jon Hendricks, Antonio Carlos Jobim, Newton Mendonça	2:21

== Personnel ==
- Betty Carter – vocals
- Joe Newman – trumpet
- Conte Candoli – trumpet
- Jimmy Cleveland – trombone
- Phil Woods – alto & tenor saxophone
- Bob Ashton – tenor saxophone
- Richie Kamuca – tenor saxophone
- Danny Bank – baritone saxophone, bass clarinet
- Seymour Barab – cello
- Sidney Edwards
- Edgardo Sodero
- Lucien Schmit
- Walter Davis Jr., Russ Freeman, Lloyd Mayers – piano
- Kenny Burrell, Bucky Pizzarelli – guitar
- Monty Budwig, Richard Davis, George Duvivier – double bass
- Gary Chester, Shelly Manne, Ed Shaughnessy – drums
- Oliver Nelson – arranger/conductor (2-4, 6-8, 10-11)
- Claus Ogerman – arranger/conductor (1, 5, 9, 12-13)
