= Cleo at Carnegie: The 10th Anniversary Concert =

Live album by Cleo Laine
- Released: April 6, 1983
- Length: 72:57
- Label: RCA
- Producer: Kurt Gebauer, John Dankworth

Cleo at Carnegie: The 10th Anniversary Concert is a live album by Cleo Laine, recorded at Carnegie Hall and released in April 1983 through RCA Records. The album earned Laine a Grammy Award for Best Jazz Vocal Performance, Female. John Dankworth was the arranger and co-produced the album with Kurt Gebauer.

Musicians backing Ms. Laine were John Dankworth (Clarinet, Alto Sax, Soprano Sax, and Electric Piano (on "Stardust"); Larry Dunlap (Piano, Electric Piano, Melodica); Ray Loeckle (Flute, Tenor Sax, Soprano Sax, Bass Clarinet); Jon Ward (Acoustic Bass, Electric Bass); and Jim Zimmerman (Drums, Glockenspiel).

== Track listing ==
=== Side one ===
1. "Any Place I Hang My Head"
2. "It's a Grand Night for Singing"
3. "Good Morning"
4. "It's a Lovely Day Today"
5. "I'm Shadowing You"
6. "Crazy Rhythm"
7. "Primrose Color Blue"

=== Side two ===
1. "We Are the Music Makers"
2. "You Spotted Snakes"
3. "Methuselah"
4. "When I Was One and Twenty"
5. "Sing Me No Song"
6. "Triboro' Fair"

=== Side three ===
1. "You've Got To Do What You've Got To Do"
2. "He Was Beautiful"
3. "Turkish Delight"
4. "Never Let Me Go"

=== Side four ===
Hoagy Carmichael Medley

1. "Georgia on My Mind"
2. "Lazy Bones"
3. "The Nearness of You"
4. "I Get Along Without You Very Well"
5. "My Resistance Is Low"
6. "Stardust"
7. "I Want to Be Happy"
