= Ray Charles and Betty Carter =

Studio album by Ray Charles and Betty Carter
- Released: August 1961
- Recorded: August 23, 1960 – June 14, 1961
- Studio: Radio Recorders (Hollywood)
- Genre: Jazz
- Length: 41:38
- Label: ABC
- Producer: Sid Feller

Ray Charles chronology
The Genius After Hours (1961)	Ray Charles and Betty Carter (1961)	The Genius Sings the Blues (1961)

Betty Carter chronology
The Modern Sound of Betty Carter (1960)	Ray Charles and Betty Carter (1961)	'Round Midnight (1962)

Alternative cover / re-issue
- 1998 Rhino CD re-issue with Dedicated to You

Professional ratings
Review scores
Source	Rating
Allmusic	4/5 stars

Ray Charles and Betty Carter is a 1961 album by Betty Carter and Ray Charles. A 1988 CD/LP re-issue included three bonus tracks and the 1998 Rhino Records re-issue combined, on a single CD, the original Ray Charles and Betty Carter with the complete Dedicated to You.

== Chart performance ==
The album debuted on Billboard magazine's Top LP's chart in the issue dated September 10, 1961, peaking at No. 52 during a fifteen-week run on the chart.

== Track listing ==
=== Original LP release ===
1. "Ev'ry Time We Say Goodbye" (Cole Porter) – 4:41
2. "You and I" (Meredith Willson) – 3:28
3. Intro: "Goodbye"/"We'll Be Together Again" (Gordon Jenkins)/(Carl T. Fischer, Frankie Laine) – 3:20
4. "People Will Say We're in Love" (Oscar Hammerstein II, Richard Rodgers) – 2:51
5. "Cocktails for Two" (Sam Coslow, Arthur Johnston) – 3:15
6. "Side by Side" (Harry M. Woods, Gus Kahn) – 2:23
7. "Baby, It's Cold Outside" (Frank Loesser) – 4:10
8. "Together" (Lew Brown, Buddy De Sylva, Ray Henderson) – 1:35
9. "For All We Know" (J. Fred Coots, Sam M. Lewis) – 3:44
10. "Takes Two to Tango" (Al Hoffman, Dick Manning) – 3:22
11. "Alone Together" (Howard Dietz, Arthur Schwartz) – 4:45
12. "Just You, Just Me" (Jesse Greer, Raymond Klages) – 2:04

=== Bonus tracks on 1988 CD/LP re-issue ===
13. "But On the Other Hand Baby" (Charles, Percy Mayfield) – 3:11
14. "I Never See Maggie Alone" (Harry Tilsley, Everett Lynton) – 5:37
15. "I Like to Hear It Sometime" (Jodie Edwards) – 2:50

=== Additional tracks on 1998 Rhino Records re-issue ===
- all 12 tracks from Dedicated to You

== Personnel ==
- Ray Charles - vocals, keyboards
- Betty Carter - vocals

Original LP tracks

- Bill Pitman - guitar
- Edgar Willis - bass guitar
- Mel Lewis, Bruno Carr - drums
- Hank Crawford - alto saxophone
- David "Fathead" Newman - tenor saxophone
- Leroy Cooper - baritone saxophone
- The Jack Halloran Singers - background vocals
- Marty Paich - arranger, conductor
- Sid Feller - producer

Recorded - Radio Recorders, Hollywood on June 13–14, 1961.

== Charts ==
Chart (1961)	Peak position
US Billboard Top LPs (150 Best-Selling Monoraul LP's)	52

== References and external links ==
- ABC S 385
