= Inside Betty Carter =

Studio album by Betty Carter
- Released: 1964
- Recorded: April 1964 (reissue bonus tracks March 4 and May 26, 1965)
- Genre: Vocal jazz
- Length: 45:41 (reissue)
- Label: United Artists
- Producer: Alan Douglas

Betty Carter chronology
'Round Midnight (1963)	Inside Betty Carter (1964)	Betty Carter at the Village Vanguard (1970)

Inside Betty Carter is a 1964 Betty Carter album. It contains the first recording of Carter's signature song, "Open the Door". Originally released on the United Artists label with eight tracks, it was reissued by Capitol Records in 1993 with seven previously unreleased tracks from a 1965 recording session that included Kenny Burrell on guitar.

Carter said in 1979 that Inside Betty Carter was one of her two favorite albums out of the eleven she had recorded to date.

== Reception ==
Professional ratings
Review scores
Source	Rating
Allmusic	2.5/5 stars
The Penguin Guide to Jazz	3.5/4 stars

Scott Yanow, writing for AllMusic, gave Inside Betty Carter two and a half stars out of five. Yanow commented that "These recordings can be considered the final ones of Betty Carter's early period for, by the time she next appeared on record...the singer was much more adventurous in her improvisations...Highly recommended to Betty Carter fans and to those listeners who find her later work somewhat forbidding."

Ebony magazine described Inside Betty Carter on its 1973 reissue as "...nothing less than a tour de force of the jazz singer's art...the sensitivity of her renditions is simply shattering. The unusual high quality of this album causes one to ask why more of her recordings are not on the market."

== Track listing ==
1. "This Is Always" (Mack Gordon, Harry Warren) – 3:10
2. "Look No Further" (Richard Rodgers) – 1:55
3. "Beware My Heart" (Sam Coslow) – 5:07
4. "My Favorite Things" (Rodgers, Oscar Hammerstein II) – 1:35
5. "Some Other Time" (Sammy Cahn, Jule Styne) – 3:46
6. "Open the Door" (Betty Carter) – 3:11
7. "Spring Can Really Hang You up the Most" (Fran Landesman, Tommy Wolff) – 5:15
8. "Something Big" (Richard Adler) – 1:58
9. "New England" (unknown) – 2:55
10. "The Moon is Low" (Arthur Freed, Nacio Herb Brown) – 2:00
11. "Once in Your Life" (unknown) – 2:54
12. "It's a Big Wide Wonderful World" (John Rox) – 1:48
13. "There Is No Greater Love" (Marty Symes, Isham Jones) – 3:46
14. "You're a Sweetheart" (Jimmy McHugh, Harold Adamson) – 4:02
15. "Isn't it Romantic?" (Rodgers, Lorenz Hart) – 1:44

(Tracks 9–15 not included on the original LP issue)

== Personnel ==
Recorded April 1964 at Sound Makers, New York City, New York, USA

- Betty Carter – vocals
- Harold Mabern – piano
- Bob Cranshaw – bass
- Roy McCurdy – drums

Recorded March 4 and May 26, 1965 at Regent Sound, New York City, New York, USA

- Betty Carter – vocals
- Kenny Burrell – guitar
- unknown piano, bass and drums
