= Mark Zubek =

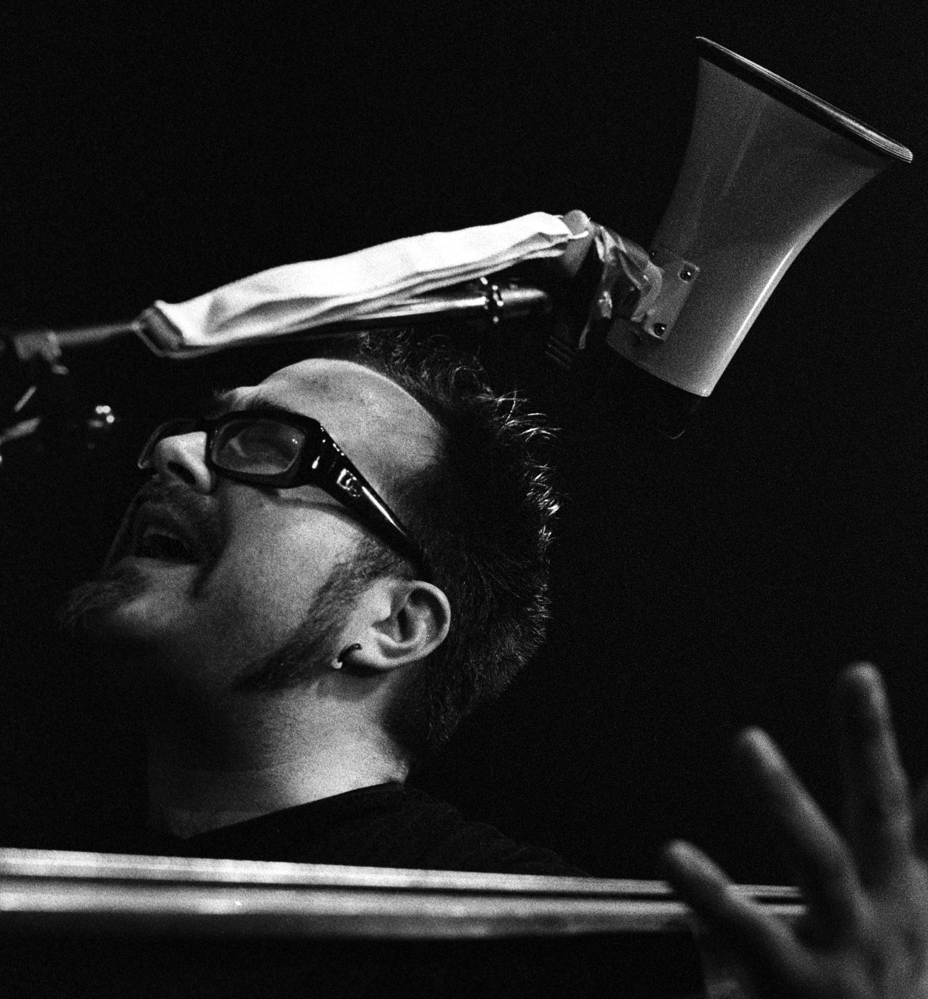
- Zubek performs in Toronto, Canada, in 2008

Background information
- Born: June 19, 1974 (age 51); Mississauga, Ontario, Canada
- Genres: Jazz
- Occupation: Musician

Mark Zubek (born June 19, 1974) is a songwriter, and jazz musician. His songwriting styles are influenced by pop, rock, R&B, hip hop, and jazz. He was discovered by Betty Carter, who wrote lyrics for and performed a composition of his.

Zubek was a member of the Toronto Songwriters' Association and has written jingles for companies like Coca-Cola, Dunkin' Donuts and the Discovery Channel.

Zubek writes and produces albums for singers and bands, arranges, plays instruments, and does sound engineering from his home studio.

== Discography ==
=== As leader ===
Zubek has released two solo jazz records on Fresh Sound Records: "Horse With a Broken Leg" (2000) and "twentytwodollarfishlunch" (2009).

== Additional information ==
=== Reviews ===
All About Jazz Magazine: Toronto-based bass player, songwriter, and producer Mark Zubek epitomizes his many cross-genres skills in the fields of jazz, hip-hop, R&B, and pop. Zubek's compositions revolve around his propulsive playing and the fat sound of his upright bass. Zubek's impressive vision and original compositions succeeds in blurring the artificial boundaries between jazz and other popular genres.

The All Music Guide says that Zubek gets a remarkably fat, woody sound from his bass instrument.

In 2009, Lee Mergner wrote for Jazz Times Magazine that Zubek's music is "Well crafted with a definite edge...like the 21st century Jazz Messengers...this is punk-jazz for now people."
