= Speak Love =

Studio album by Ella Fitzgerald and Joe Pass
- Released: 1983
- Recorded: March 21–22, 1983
- Genre: Jazz
- Length: 42:33
- Label: Pablo
- Producer: Norman Granz

Ella Fitzgerald chronology
The Best Is Yet to Come (1982)	Speak Love (1983)	Nice Work If You Can Get It (1983)

Joe Pass chronology
Virtuoso No. 4 (1983)	Speak Love (1983)	Live at Long Beach City College (1983)

Speak Love is a 1983 studio album by the American jazz singer Ella Fitzgerald, accompanied by the jazz guitarist Joe Pass.

It is the third of Fitzgerald's series of duets with Pass, following Take Love Easy (1973) and Fitzgerald and Pass... Again (1976) a later album, Easy Living, followed in 1986.

The title of the album refers to the first line of the opening song on the album, "Speak Low", a quotation from Much Ado About Nothing.

== Reception ==
Professional ratings
Review scores
Source	Rating
AllMusic	2/5 stars
The Penguin Guide to Jazz Recordings	3/4 stars

AllMusic critic Scott Yanow wrote that "the setting was perhaps too intimate for what she had left. Fitzgerald's phrasing remained a joy despite the limited range, but there are many more significant records by the singer than this CD reissue despite touching versions of 'Comes Love', 'There's No You' and 'Gone with the Wind'."

== Track listing ==
1. "Speak Low" (Ogden Nash, Kurt Weill) – 4:13
2. "Comes Love" (Lew Brown, Sam H. Stept, Charles Tobias) – 3:00
3. "There's No You" (Tom Adair, Hal Hopper) – 4:45
4. "I May Be Wrong (But I Think You're Wonderful)" (Harry Ruskin, Henry Sullivan) – 5:08
5. "At Last" (Mack Gordon, Harry Warren) – 4:21
6. "The Thrill Is Gone" {Medley} (Lew Brown, Ray Henderson) – 4:14
7. "Gone with the Wind" (Herbert Magidson, Allie Wrubel) – 3:55
8. "Blue and Sentimental" (Count Basie, Mack David, Jerry Livingston) – 3:06
9. "Girl Talk" (Neal Hefti, Bobby Troup) – 4:09
10. "Georgia on My Mind" (Hoagy Carmichael, Stuart Gorrell) – 6:09

== Personnel ==
- Ella Fitzgerald - vocals
- Joe Pass - guitar
