= Sittin' on Top of the World (Dean Martin album) =

Studio album by Dean Martin
- Released: May 29, 1973
- Recorded: 1973
- Genre: Traditional pop
- Length: 29:37
- Label: Reprise – R/RS 6428
- Producer: Jimmy Bowen

Dean Martin chronology
Dino (1971)	Sittin' on Top of the World (1973)	You're the Best Thing That Ever Happened to Me (1973)

Sittin' on Top of the World is the thirty-first studio album by Dean Martin arranged by Van Alexander and produced by Jimmy Bowen. This was Martin's first album to be released for 16 months, and was only his second album not recorded in the Countrypolitan style since 1965.

The album became his first new album not to chart for 10 years. It was reissued on CD by Capitol Records in 2006 and Hip-O Records in 2009.

== Reception ==
Professional ratings
Review scores
Source	Rating
Allmusic	3/5 stars

The initial Billboard review from 26 May 1973 said that "These sound like old, old, cuts..He's also not had an LP out in several years. Very Dixielandish". William Ruhlmann on Allmusic.com gave the album three stars out of five. Ruhlmann said that "Martin's most recent efforts had been commercially negligible, so Bowen was well-advised to try something different, but, especially because Martin albums were becoming so occasional, his audience had largely lost track of him...".

== Track listing ==
1. "I'm Sitting on Top of the World" (Ray Henderson, Sam M. Lewis, Joe Young) – 2:13
2. "I Wonder Who's Kissing Her Now" (Joseph E. Howard) – 2:22
3. "Smile" (Charlie Chaplin, Geoff Parsons, John Turner) – 2:54
4. "Ramblin' Rose" (Joel Sherman, Noel Sherman) – 2:14
5. "Almost Like Being in Love" (Alan Jay Lerner, Frederick Loewe) – 2:01
6. "It's a Good Day" (Dave Barbour, Peggy Lee) – 2:09
7. "At Sundown" (Walter Donaldson) – 2:40
8. "When the Red, Red Robin (Comes Bob, Bob, Bobbin' Along)" (Harry M. Woods) – 2:29
9. "You Made Me Love You (I Didn't Want to Do It)" (Joseph McCarthy, James V. Monaco) – 2:33
10. "I'm Forever Blowing Bubbles" (John Kellette, Jean Kenbrovin) – 2:23

== Personnel ==
- Dean Martin – vocals
- Van Alexander – arranger
- Jimmy Bowen – record producer
- Ed Thrasher – art direction
- John Guess – audio engineer
- Allen Zentz
- Ricci Martin – photography
