= It's a Good Day =

Single by Peggy Lee
- B-side: "He's Just My Kind"
- Released: November 16, 1946
- Recorded: September 28, 1946
- Genre: Traditional pop
- Length: 2:54
- Label: Capitol Records
- Songwriters: Dave Barbour, Peggy Lee

Music video
- "It's a Good Day" on YouTube

"It's a Good Day" is a popular song written by Peggy Lee and her first husband Dave Barbour and published in 1946. Peggy Lee's recording reached the Billboard charts in January, 1947 peaking at No. 16.

== Other Recordings ==
- Dean Martin covered the song for his 1973 album Sittin' on Top of the World
- Peggy Lee dueted the song with Bing Crosby on four occasions on Crosby's Philco Radio Time show in 1946/47 and Crosby sang it solo on the June 11, 1947 program. This version was included in the album "Swingin' with Bing! Bing Crosby's Lost Radio Performances". Phil Harris recorded a version of "It's a Good Day" for RCA Victor in 1947.
- Perry Como recorded this song for his album So Smooth in 1955 and sang it in live performances.
