= University of Akron Concert =

Live album by Joe Pass
- Released: 1986
- Recorded: 1985
- Venue: University of Akron, Akron, Ohio
- Genre: Jazz
- Label: Pablo

Joe Pass chronology
Whitestone (1985)	University of Akron Concert (1986)	Easy Living (1986)

University of Akron Concert is a live album by jazz guitarist Joe Pass that was released in 1986.

== Reception ==
Professional ratings
Review scores
Source	Rating
Allmusic	4/5 stars
The Penguin Guide to Jazz Recordings	3/4 stars

Writing for Allmusic, music critic Scott Yanow wrote of the album "This is a fine all-around performance that still sounds impressive today"

== Track listing ==
1. "It's a Wonderful World" (Harold Adamson, Jan Savitt, Johnny Watson)
2. "Body and Soul" (Edward Heyman, Robert Sour, Frank Eyton, Johnny Green)
3. "Bridge Work" (Count Basie)
4. "Tarde" (Márcio Borges, Milton Nascimento)
5. "Time In" (Joe Pass)
6. Duke Ellington Medley:
  1. "Isfahan" (Duke Ellington, Billy Strayhorn)
  2. "Prelude to a Kiss" (Ellington, Mack Gordon, Irving Mills)
  3. "Squeeze Me" (Fats Waller, Clarence Williams)
  4. "Take the "A" Train" (Strayhorn)
  5. "Sophisticated Lady" (Ellington, Mills, Mitchell Parish)
  6. "Lush Life" (Strayhorn)
  7. "Satin Doll" (Ellington, Johnny Mercer, Strayhorn)
7. "Joy Spring" (Clifford Brown)
8. "I'm Glad There Is You" (Jimmy Dorsey, Paul Mertz)

== Personnel ==
- Joe Pass – guitar
