= Blues for Fred =

Songs for Fred

Studio album by Joe Pass
- Released: 1988
- Recorded: February 2–3, 1988
- Studio: Fantasy Studios, Berkeley, California
- Genre: Jazz
- Length: 55:08
- Label: Pablo
- Producer: Eric Miller

Joe Pass chronology
Sound Project (1987)	Songs for Fred (1988)	One for My Baby (1988)

Blues for Fred is an album by jazz guitarist Joe Pass that was released in 1988. It was recorded as a tribute to singer and dancer Fred Astaire, who died the previous year.

After many albums produced by Norman Granz (who sold Pablo to Fantasy Records in 1987), this is Pass's first album with producer Eric Miller.

== Reception ==
Professional ratings
Review scores
Source	Rating
AllMusic	4/5 stars
The Penguin Guide to Jazz Recordings	3/4 stars

AllMusic's Scott Yanow wrote: "Pass interprets the music with taste, solid swing, and constant creativity within the bop tradition. His versions of 'Cheek to Cheek', 'Night and Day', 'Lady Be Good' and 'The Way You Look Tonight' in particular are quite enjoyable and make one appreciate the uniqueness of this classic guitarist." The All About Jazz review concluded: "While the novelty of Pass's skills had long worn off by now, the talent still remains. Virtuoso is still his crowning achievement, but Blues For Fred is of similar artistic merit."

== Track listing ==
No.	Title	Writer(s)	Length
1.	"Cheek to Cheek"	Irving Berlin	5:38
2.	"By Myself"	Howard Dietz, Arthur Schwartz	4:21
3.	"Night and Day"	Cole Porter	5:22
4.	"They Can't Take That Away from Me"	George Gershwin, Ira Gershwin	4:38
5.	"Blues for Fred/They All Laughed"	Pass, Gershwin, Gershwin	6:15
6.	"Dancing in the Dark"	Dietz, Schwartz	4:56
7.	"Oh, Lady Be Good!"	Gershwin, Gershwin	4:39
8.	"I Concentrate on You"	Porter	7:14
9.	"A Foggy Day"	Gershwin, Gershwin	2:38
10.	"The Way You Look Tonight"	Dorothy Fields, Jerome Kern	6:12
11.	"Tap Blues"	Pass	3:55

== Personnel ==
- Joe Pass - guitar
