= Tommy Gumina =

American jazz musician

Thomas Joseph Gumina (May 20, 1931 in Milwaukee – October 28, 2013) was an American jazz accordionist and musical instrument builder.

Gumina began playing accordion at age eleven, and took lessons on the instrument in Chicago throughout the second half of the 1940s. He began working with Harry James on television in 1952 as an accompanist for popular tunes, and in 1955 Gumina began working on his own, both solo and with an ensemble. He recorded with Buddy DeFranco and Willie Smith in the 1960s, and began experimenting with modifying an electric accordion, whose amplified sound resembled that of an electronic organ. He was occasionally active as a performer in the 1970s (e.g., with Art Pepper in 1974), but increasingly concentrated on his amplifier manufacturing business, Polytone Musical Instruments, which was based in North Hollywood, California. He and Joe Pass co-founded Polytone Records in 1987.
