= The Audience with Betty Carter =

1980 live album by Betty Carter

Live album by Betty Carter
- Released: 1980
- Recorded: December 6–8, 1979
- Venue: Bradshaw's Great American Music Hall, San Francisco
- Genre: Vocal jazz
- Length: 91:20
- Label: Betcar, Verve (reissue)
- Producer: Betty Carter

Betty Carter chronology
The Betty Carter Album (1976)	The Audience with Betty Carter (1980)	Whatever Happened to Love? (1982)

Professional ratings
Review scores
Source	Rating
Allmusic	4/5 stars
Penguin Guide to Jazz	👑
The Rolling Stone Jazz Record Guide	5/5 stars

The Audience with Betty Carter is a 1980 live double album by the American jazz singer Betty Carter.

== Signatures ==
The album's first track, "Sounds (Movin' On)", is 25 minutes in length and features an epic scat solo. As noted by Nate Smith, "across various tempo and meter changes — a peppy intro, a floating 5/4, a blastoff into a 4/4 burnout, a drumless waltz, a funky, lean mid-tempo swing — we witness the simultaneous tightness and looseness of this shape-shifting group" composed of John Hicks on piano, Curtis Lundy on bass, and Kenny Washington on drums. "Betty is the sun around which these three planets revolve, conducting dynamics from top to bottom. This record is the sound of a virtuoso joyfully throwing her musical weight around the bandstand. As hard as this rhythm section swings, she makes it swing even harder...a monument to the dexterity of Betty’s voice, her incredible pocket, the openness of her ears and her fearlessness as an improviser and bandleader."

The use of the Academy Award-nominated classic "The Trolley Song", is a nod to the city of San Francisco, where the album was recorded.

The second half of the album features several songs written by Carter, including "Tight" which Monifa Brown of WBGO Jazz cites as "a prime example of her majestic hold on the music. Carter’s flawless diction and crisp intonation tease and please as she dances around the stop-time stabs laid down by [her band]. Carter was fond of singing and talking about relationships; this time she preaches the art of holding onto a man."

The penultimate track is a fresh take on Rodgers and Hammerstein's "My Favorite Things from The Sound of Music, far different from the version by John Coltrane on his 1960 album of the same name. Keanna Faircloth of WBGO Jazz hailed it as "a master class in bandstand domination...At first, Betty plays with time like a toy, daring her band to stay vigilant. And they do, especially the bassist Curtis Lundy, who goes from walking the bass line to sprinting, keeping pace with her fierce energy. It’s like a game of musical tag, and she’s definitely 'it.' She simultaneously pulls the audience in, making every word count with a magnetism only she can deliver."

The set ends with the plaintive "Open the Door," Carter's signature tune.

The Audience With Betty Carter was first released on Carter's own Bet-Car Records and later reissued on Verve.

== Reception ==
The album was released to great acclaim and eventually nominated for the Grammy Award for Best Jazz Vocal Performance, Female.

Since then, its reputation has only grown with Stuart Nicholson writing that it was the strongest argument on record that Carter was among the greatest of jazz singers. "After all, one of the most sophisticated jazz vocalists of them all, Carmen McRae, once said, ‘There’s really only one jazz singer — only one. Betty Carter.’ You only have to hear The Audience With Betty Carter once to see what she means. To call it a jazz vocal album is limiting, it’s a great jazz album, and certainly numbers among the greatest jazz albums ever made."

Samara Joy, who would record "Tight" nearly four decades later, has cited Carter as a great influence, particularly for this album, writing that "every song she touches, she makes it her own and shapes it in ways others couldn’t even begin to imagine. I’m forever inspired by her musicality and genius."

The Penguin Guide to Jazz awarded the album four out of four stars, including a special crown for a "recording of merit", an honor bestowed on fewer than 100 jazz recordings."

The Audience with Betty Carter was later included in an appendix to 1000 Recordings to Hear Before You Die.

== Track listing ==
Disc One

1. "Sounds" (Movin' On) (Betty Carter) – 25:20
2. "I Think I Got It Now" (Carter) – 3:33
3. "Caribbean Sun" (Carlos Garnett) – 4:17
4. "The Trolley Song" (Ralph Blane, Hugh Martin) – 3:37
5. "Everything I Have Is Yours" (Harold Adamson, Burton Lane) – 6:16
6. "I'll Buy You a Star" (Dorothy Fields, Arthur Schwartz) – 2:12

Disc Two

1. "I Could Write a Book" (Lorenz Hart, Richard Rodgers) – 3:41
2. "Can't We Talk It Over"/"Either It's Love or It Isn't" (Doris Fisher, Allan Roberts)/(Ned Washington, Victor Young) – 7:26
3. "Deep Night" (Charles Henderson, Rudy Vallée) – 2:45
4. "Spring Can Really Hang You up the Most" (Fran Landesman, Tommy Wolf) – 7:22
5. "Tight" (Carter) – 3:44
6. "Fake" (Carter) – 4:16
7. "So..." (Carter) – 7:03
8. "My Favorite Things" (Oscar Hammerstein II, Rodgers) – 4:39
9. "Open the Door" (Carter) – 5:09

== Personnel ==
(Recorded December 6–8, 1979, Great American Music Hall, San Francisco)

- Betty Carter - vocals
- John Hicks - piano
- Curtis Lundy - double bass
- Kenny Washington - drums
