= Look What I Got! =

Studio album by Betty Carter
- Released: 1988
- Recorded: 1988
- Genre: Vocal jazz
- Length: 47:01
- Label: Verve
- Producer: Betty Carter

Betty Carter chronology
Whatever Happened to Love? (1982)	Look What I Got! (1988)	Droppin' Things (1990)

Professional ratings
Review scores
Source	Rating
Allmusic	4/5 stars

Look What I Got! is a 1988 album by the American jazz singer Betty Carter.

At the 31st Grammy Awards, Carter's performance on this album won her the Grammy Award for Best Jazz Vocal Performance, Female.

== Track listing ==
For the 1992 Verve CD Issue, 835661-2.

1. "Look What I Got!" (Betty Carter) – 5:41
2. "That Sunday, That Summer" (Joe Sherman, George David Weiss) – 4:51
3. "The Man I Love" (George Gershwin, Ira Gershwin) – 7:28
4. "All I Got" (Diane Cole) – 4:40
5. "Just Like the Movies" (Time) (Carter) – 4:20
6. "Imagination" (Johnny Burke, Jimmy Van Heusen) – 4:23
7. "Mr. Gentleman" (Sequel to "Tight") (Carter) – 2:40
8. "Make It Last" (Bob Haymes) – 6:00
9. "The Good Life" (Sacha Distel, Jack Reardon) – 6:58

== Personnel ==
- Betty Carter - vocals
- Benny Green - piano
- Stephen Scott - piano
- Don Braden -tenor sax
- Michael Bowie - double bass
- Lewis Nash - drums, guitar
- Winard Harper - drums
