= Droppin' Things =

Live album by Betty Carter
- Released: September 1990
- Recorded: May 25–26, 1990, at The Bottom Line, New York City and June 7, at Mastersound, New York City
- Genre: Vocal jazz
- Length: 61:34
- Label: Verve 843 991-2
- Producer: Betty Carter

Betty Carter chronology
| Look What I Got! (1988) | Droppin' Things (1990) | It's Not About the Melody (1992) |

Professional ratings
Review scores
| Source | Rating |
|---|---|
| Allmusic | 3/5 stars |
| Downbeat | 4/5 stars |

Droppin' Things is a 1990 live album by the American jazz singer Betty Carter.

At the 32nd Grammy Awards, Carter's performance on this album was nominated for the Grammy Award for Best Jazz Vocal Performance, Female.

Droppin' Things peaked at 3 on the Billboard Top Jazz Albums chart.

== Reception ==
Professional ratings
Review scores
| Source | Rating |
|---|---|
| AllMusic | 3/5 stars |

In his review for AllMusic, Scott Yanow wrote that Droppin' Things "solidified her [Carter's] credentials as one of jazz's top singers", and described the music as "consistently stimulating".

Frank John-Hadley wrote in his Downbeat review that Droppin' Things "showcases an unerringly precise, lucent alto voice—one of the most instantly recognizable in jazz- taking the risks of an especially creative instrumentalist". He gave the album 4 stars.

== Track listing ==
For the 1990 Verve CD Issue, 843991-2.

1. "30 Years" (Betty Carter) – 3:58
2. "Stardust"/"Memories of You" (Hoagy Carmichael, Mitchell Parish)/(Eubie Blake, Andy Razaf) – 12:37
3. "What's the Use of Wond'rin'?" (Oscar Hammerstein II, Richard Rodgers) – 5:22
4. "Open the Door '90" (Carter) – 5:20
5. "Droppin' Things" (Carter) – 6:34
6. "I Love Music" (Emile Boyd, Hal Smith) – 7:40
7. "Why Him?" (Burton Lane, Alan Jay Lerner) – 7:50
8. "Dull Day (In Chicago)" (Carter) – 12:13

== Personnel ==
Performance

- Betty Carter - vocals, producer
- Geri Allen - piano
- Marc Cary - piano
- Craig Handy - tenor saxophone
- Freddie Hubbard - trumpet
- Tarus Mateen - double bass
- Gregory Hutchinson - drums

Production

- Chris Thompson - art direction
- Joe Ferla - engineer, mixing, recording
- Joe Newland - digital editor
- Ed Korengo, Dave Parla, David Merrill - assistant engineer
- Rich Cook - liner notes
- Susan Ragan, Courtney Brown Jr. - photography
- Ora Ross Harris - project coordinator
- Shelia Mathis - product manager
- David Lau - design
- Kooster McAlister, Paul Prestopino - Record Plant remote
