= Nice Work If You Can Get It (album) =

Studio album by Ella Fitzgerald and André Previn
- Released: 1983
- Recorded: May 23, 1983
- Genre: Jazz
- Length: 35:44
- Label: Pablo
- Producer: Norman Granz

Ella Fitzgerald chronology
| Speak Love (1983) | Nice Work If You Can Get It (1983) | Easy Living (1986) |

André Previn chronology
| It's a Breeze (1981) | Nice Work If You Can Get It (1983) | After Hours (1989) |

Professional ratings
Review scores
| Source | Rating |
|---|---|
| AllMusic | 2.5/5 stars |
| The Penguin Guide to Jazz Recordings | 2.5/4 stars |
| The Rolling Stone Album Guide | 3.5/5 stars |

Nice Work If You Can Get It is a 1983 studio album by Ella Fitzgerald and André Previn, with accompaniment from the double bassist Niels-Henning Ørsted Pedersen.

It was Fitzgerald's only album recorded with Previn, and represented her first album of single composer material since her 1981 album Ella Abraça Jobim.

Nice Work If You Can Get It was the last in a long line of collaborations that Fitzgerald made with predominantly jazz piano accompaniment. Her earlier albums in a similar vein were Ella Sings Gershwin (1950), Ella Fitzgerald Sings Songs from "Let No Man Write My Epitaph" (1960), and Ella and Oscar (1975). For these albums she was accompanied by the pianists Ellis Larkins, Paul Smith, and Oscar Peterson respectively. Nice Work If You Can Get It was also Fitzgerald's first all Gershwin album since 1959's Ella Fitzgerald Sings the George and Ira Gershwin Songbook.

The album cover is a caricature of Fitzgerald, Previn, and the Gershwin brothers by the American cartoonist Al Hirschfeld. The album notes were written by Benny Green.

== Track listing ==
1. "A Foggy Day" – 6:10
2. "Nice Work If You Can Get It" – 5:14
3. "But Not for Me" – 3:54
4. "Let's Call the Whole Thing Off" – 2:46
5. "How Long Has This Been Going On?" – 5:01
6. "Who Cares?" – 4:30
7. Medley: "I've Got a Crush on You"/"Someone to Watch Over Me"/"Embraceable You" – 4:56
8. "They Can't Take That Away from Me" – 3:27

All songs composed by George Gershwin, with all lyrics written by Ira Gershwin.

== Personnel ==
- Ella Fitzgerald - vocals
- André Previn - piano
- Niels-Henning Ørsted Pedersen - double bass
