= Norman Mapp =

American jazz musician

John Norman Mapp (1928–1988) was an American jazz vocalist, lyricist and composer.

== Biography ==
Mapp was born and raised in East Elmhurst, Queens, New York. He started his music career as a singer with the U.S. Army band during World War II while stationed in Europe. He returned home a disabled veteran, after his honorable discharge.

After Dinah Washington heard Mapp singing in his debut at a nightclub in Harlem, she adopted him as her protégé, encouraged him to continue singing and writing songs, and helped him start his career as a soloist and big-band musician.

Mapp's songs include "Jazz Ain't Nothin' but Soul", "I Worry 'Bout You", "Mr. Ugly", "In the Night", "Free Spirits", and "Foul Play". His songs were performed by Count Basie, Betty Carter, Marvin Gaye, Gigi Gryce, Peggy Lee, and Arthur Prysock.

== Death ==
Mapp died in February 1988 aged 59. Anthony Scaduto wrote an obituary of Mapp for New York Newsday.

== Discography ==
- Jazz Aint Nothin but Soul
