= John Blackburn (songwriter) =

American lyricist

John M. Blackburn (October 19, 1913 in Massillon, Ohio – November 15, 2006 in Newport, Oregon) was a lyricist. He wrote the lyrics to "Moonlight in Vermont".

He was raised in Shaker Heights, a suburb of Cleveland, Ohio.

He traveled with a puppet theater that brought him to Vermont, inspiring the lyrics to "Moonlight in Vermont", the music was composed by Karl Suessdorf. It was introduced by Margaret Whiting in 1944.

In 1957, Oscar Peterson recorded Blackburn's "Susquehanna".
