= Karl Suessdorf =

Karl A. Suessdorf (April 28, 1911 – February 25, 1982) was an American songwriter.

== Biography ==
The son of Henry F. Suessdorf, he was born in Valdez, Alaska, United States, where his father operated from 1907 to 1917 the Copper Block Buffet, a hotel and saloon that offered electric lights, hot baths and steam, and served men only. At the time of the 1920 U.S. Census (January 1920), Karl was living in Los Angeles with his grandmother. In 1938, he married Anna E. van Kleeff (stage name Kita van Cleve), who was then performing the part of Herodias in the Lester Horton non-verbal all-dance production of the play "Salome" written by Oscar Wilde. At the time of the 1940 U.S. Census (April 1940), the couple was renting a small house in Hollywood; his occupation was listed as a "salesman" working in a gasoline station. He and Kita were divorced about 1946.

Suessdorf was best known for his collaboration with lyricist John Blackburn in composing the jazz standard, "Moonlight in Vermont", which was first recorded in 1944 by Billy Butterfield's Orchestra featuring Margaret Whiting. He also composed "I Wish I Knew" (1945) and "Susquehanna" (1957) with Blackburn and "Sea at Monterey" (1957) with Blackburn and Steve Graham (pseud. of Michael H. Goldsen). Suessdorf composed "Christmas Madonna" (1958) and "Coral Sea" (1965) with lyrics by Nick Cea; "Key Largo" (1948) (sung by Marian McPartland) and "She Doesn't Laugh Like You" (1964) with Benny Carter and Leah Worth; and a 1949 hit for Perry Como, "Did Anyone Ever Tell You, Mrs. Murphy?", with lyrics by Leah Worth and Lloyd Sloan.

Apart from the many other performers who have recorded Suessdorf's compositions, including Billie Holiday and Frank Sinatra, Sarah Vaughan's compilation album Music of the Stars, Volume 2: Songs Recorded by Sarah Vaughan included both "Key Largo" and "Moonlight in Vermont".

Suessdorf died at the age of 70 of a heart ailment in Fallbrook, California in 1982.
