= Betty Carter =

American jazz singer-songwriter (1929–1998)

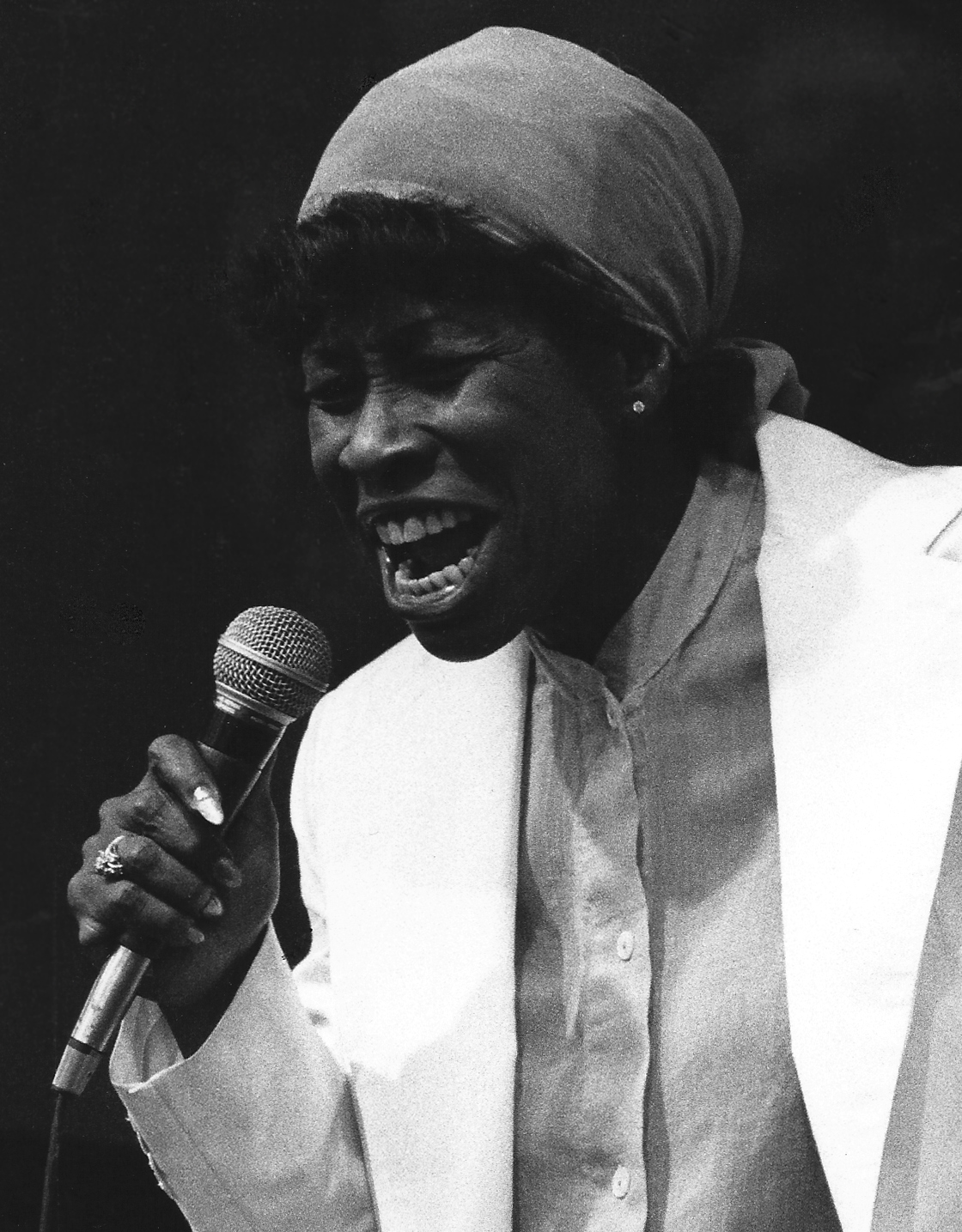
- Carter at the Pori Jazz festival, 1978

Background information
- Also known as: Lorene Carter; Lorraine Carter
- Born: Lillie Mae Jones; May 16, 1929; Flint, Michigan, U.S.
- Died: September 26, 1998 (aged 69) New York City, U.S.
- Genres: Jazz; bebop; post-bop
- Occupation: Singer-songwriter
- Instrument: Vocals
- Years active: 1948–1998
- Labels: Columbia; Peacock; ABC; ATCO; United Artists; Roulette; Bet-Car; Verve
- Education: Detroit Conservatory of Music

Betty Carter (born Lillie Mae Jones; May 16, 1929 – September 26, 1998) was an American jazz singer known for her improvisational technique, scatting, and other complex musical abilities that demonstrated her vocal talent and imaginative interpretation of lyrics and melodies. Vocalist Carmen McRae once remarked, "There's really only one jazz singer—only one: Betty Carter."

== Early life ==
Carter was born in Flint, Michigan, and grew up in Detroit, where her father, James Jones, was the musical director of a Detroit church and her mother, Bessie, was a housewife. As a child, Carter was raised to be extremely independent and to not expect nurturing from her family. Even 30 years after leaving home, Carter was still very aware of and affected by the home life she was raised in, and was quoted saying:

I have been far removed from my immediate family. There's been no real contact or phone calls home every week to find out how everybody is ... As far as family is concerned, it's been a lonesome trek ... It's probably just as much my fault as it is theirs, and I can't blame anybody for it. But there was ... no real closeness, where the family urged me on, or said ... "We're proud" ... and all that. No, no ... none of that happened.

While the lack of support from Carter's family caused her to feel isolated, it may also have instilled in her self-reliance and determination to succeed. She studied piano at the Detroit Conservatory of Music at the age of 15, but only attained a modest level of expertise.

At the age of 16, Carter began singing. As her parents were not big proponents of her pursuing a singing career, she would sneak out at night to audition for amateur shows. After winning first place at her first amateur competition, Carter felt as though she were being accepted into the music world and decided that she must pursue it tirelessly. When she began performing live, she was too young to be admitted into bars, so she obtained a forged birth certificate to gain entry in order to perform.

== Career ==
Even at a young age, Carter was able to bring a new vocal style to jazz. The breathiness of her voice was a characteristic seldom heard before her appearance on the music scene. She also was well known for her passion for scat singing and her strong belief that the throwaway attitude that most jazz musicians approached it with was inappropriate and wasteful. Her scatting was known to display a degree of spontaneity and basic inventiveness that was seldom seen elsewhere.

Detroit, where Carter grew up, was a hotbed of jazz growth. After signing with a talent agent after her win at amateur night, Carter had opportunities to perform with famous jazz artists such as Dizzy Gillespie, who visited Detroit for an extensive amount of time. Gillespie is often considered responsible for her strong passion for scatting. In earlier recordings, it is apparent that her scatting had similarities to the qualities of Gillespie's.

At the time of Gillespie's visit, Charlie Parker was receiving treatment in a psychiatric hospital, delaying her encounter with him. However, Carter eventually performed with Parker, as well as with his band consisting of Tommy Potter, Max Roach, and Miles Davis. After receiving praise from both Gillespie and Parker for her vocal prowess, Carter felt an upsurge in confidence and knew that she could make it in the business with perseverance.

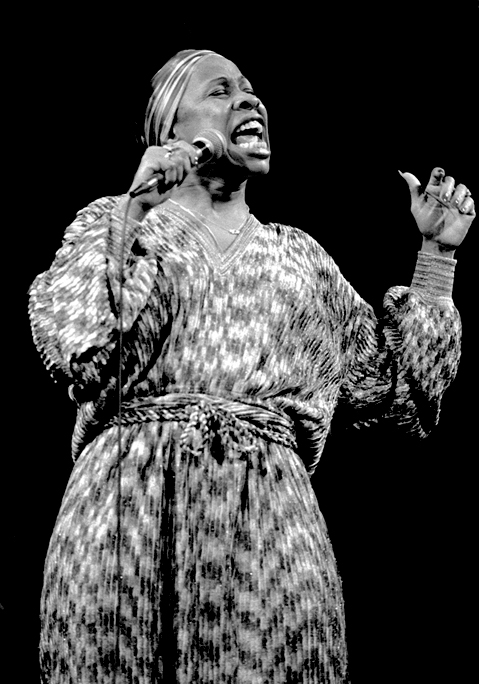
Carter at the Great American Music Hall, San Francisco, California, 1979

Carter's confidence was well-founded. In 1948, she was asked by Lionel Hampton to join his band. She finally had her big break. Working with Hampton's group gave her the chance to be bandmates with artists such as Charles Mingus and Wes Montgomery, as well as with Benny Bailey, who had recently vacated Gillespie's band, and Al Grey, who would later go on to join Gillespie's band. Hampton had an ear for talent and a love for bebop. Carter too had a deep love for bebop as well as a talent for it. Hampton's wife, Gladys, gave her the nickname "Betty Bebop", a nickname she reportedly detested. Despite her good ear and charming personality, Carter was fiercely independent and tended to attempt to resist Hampton's direction, while Hampton had a temper and was quick to anger. Hampton expected a lot from his players and did not want them to forget that he was the band's leader. She openly hated his swing style, refused to sing in a swinging way, and she was far too outspoken for his tastes. Carter honed her scat singing ability while on tour, which was not well received by Hampton, as he did not enjoy her penchant for improvisation. Over the course of two and a half years, Hampton fired Carter a total of seven times.

Carter was part of the Lionel Hampton Orchestra that played at the famed Cavalcade of Jazz in Los Angeles at Wrigley Field, which was produced by Leon Hefflin Sr. on July 10, 1949. They played in a second concert at Lane Field in San Diego on September 3, 1949. They also performed at the sixth Cavalcade of Jazz concert on June 25, 1950. Also featured on the same day were Roy Milton & His Solid Senders, Pee Wee Crayton's Orchestra, Dinah Washington, Tiny Davis & Her Hell Divers, and other artists. As many as 16,000 people were reported to be in attendance and the concert ended early because of a fracas taking place while Hampton's band played "Flying High".

Being a part of Hampton's band provided a few things for Carter, or "The Kid", a nickname bestowed upon her that stuck for the rest of her life: connections and a new approach to music, making it so that all future musical attitudes that came from Carter bore the mark of Hampton's guidance. Because Hampton hired Carter, she is also regarded as one of the last big-band era jazz singers in history. However, by 1951, Carter left the band. After a short recuperation back home, Carter was in New York, working all over the city for the better part of the early 1950s, as well as participating in an extensive tour of the south, playing for "camp shows". This work made little to no money, but Carter believed it was necessary to develop as an artist and was a way to "pay her dues".

Very soon after Carter arrived in New York City, she was allowed to record with King Pleasure and the Ray Bryant Trio, becoming more recognizable and well known and subsequently being granted the chance to sing at the Apollo Theatre, a venue known for giving up-and-coming artists the final shove into becoming household names. Carter was propelled into prominence, recording with Epic Records by 1955, and was a well-known musician by the late 1950s. Her first solo LP, Out There, was released on the Peacock label in 1958.

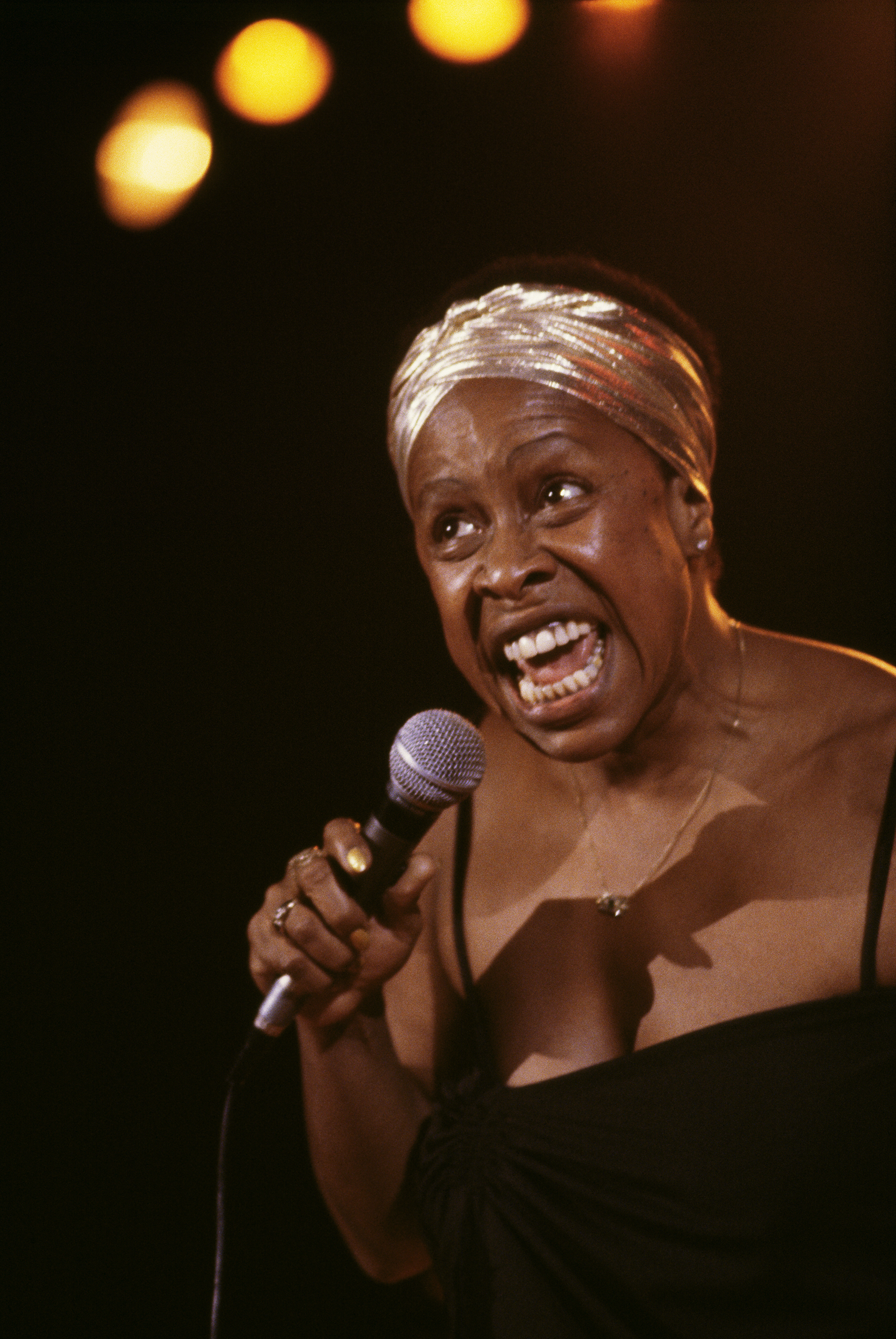
Carter in 1981

Miles Davis can be credited for Carter's bump in popularity, as he recommended to Ray Charles that he take Carter under his wing. Carter began touring with Charles in 1960, then making a recording of duets with him in 1961 (Ray Charles and Betty Carter), including the R&B-chart-topping "Baby, It's Cold Outside", which brought her a measure of popular recognition. In 1963, she toured in Japan with Sonny Rollins. She recorded for various labels during this period, including ABC-Paramount, ATCO, and United Artists, but was rarely satisfied with the resulting product. After three years of touring with Charles, and a total of two recordings together, she took a hiatus from recording to get married. She and her husband had two children. However, she continued performing, not wanting to be dependent upon her husband for financial support.

The 1960s became an increasingly difficult time for Carter as she began to slip from fame, refusing to sing contemporary pop music, and with her youth fading. Carter was nearly forty years old, which at the time was not conducive to a career in the public eye. Rock and roll, like pop, was steadily becoming more popular and provided cash flow for labels and recording companies. Carter had to work extremely hard to continue to book gigs because of the jazz decline. Her marriage also was beginning to crumble. By 1971, Carter was single and mainly performing live with a small group consisting of merely piano, bass, and drums. The Betty Carter Trio was one of the very few jazz groups to continue to book gigs in the late 1960s and early 1970s.

Carter created her record label, Bet-Car Records, in 1969, the sole recording source of her music for the next eighteen years. She recalled:

... in fact, I think I was probably the first independent label out there in '69. People thought I was crazy when I did it. "How are you gonna get any distribution?" I mean, "How are you gonna take care of business and do that yourself?" "Don't you need somebody else?" I said, "Listen. Nobody was comin' this way and I wanted the records out there, so I found out that I could do it myself." So, that's what I did. It's the best thing that ever happened to me. You know. We're talking about '69!

Some of her most famous recordings were originally issued on Bet-Car, including the double album The Audience with Betty Carter (1980). In 1980, she was the subject of a documentary film by Michelle Parkerson, But Then, She's Betty Carter. Carter's approach to music did not concern solely her method of recording and distribution, but also her choice of venues. Carter began performing at colleges and universities, starting in 1972 at Goddard College in Vermont. Carter was excited at this opportunity, as it was since the mid-1960s that Carter had been wanting to visit schools and provide some sort of education for students. She began lecturing, along with her musical performances, informing students of the history of jazz and its roots.

By 1975, Carter's life and work prospects began to improve, and she was beginning to be able to pick her jobs once again, touring in Europe, South America, and the United States. In 1976, Carter was a live guest performer on Saturday Night Live's first season on air and was also a performer at the Newport Jazz Festival in 1977 and 1978, carving out a permanent place for herself in the music business as well as in the world of jazz.

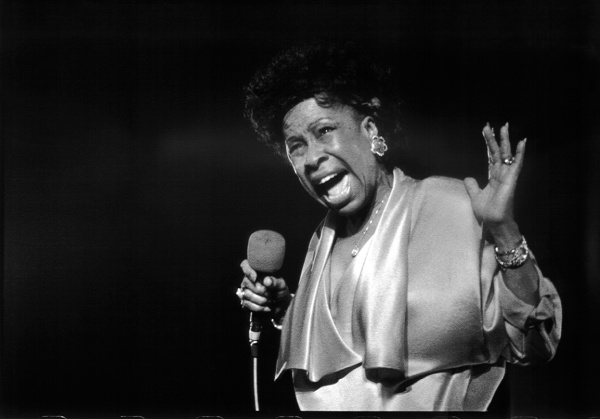
Carter at Lucerna Hall, Prague, 1986

In 1977, Carter enjoyed a new peak in critical and popular estimation, and she taught a master class with her past mentor, Dizzy Gillespie, at Harvard. In the last decade of her life, she began to receive even wider acclaim and recognition. In 1987, she signed with Verve Records, who reissued most of her Bet-Car albums on CD for the first time, making them available to wider audiences. In 1988, she won a Grammy for the album Look What I Got! and sang in a guest appearance on The Cosby Show (season 5, episode 9: "How Do You Get to Carnegie Hall?"). In 1994, she performed at the White House and was a headliner at Verve's 50th-anniversary celebration at Carnegie Hall. She was the subject of a 1994 short film by Dick Fontaine: Betty Carter: New All the Time.

In 1997, she was awarded a National Medal of Arts by President Bill Clinton. Carter considered this medal to be the most important that she had received in her lifetime.

== Death ==
Carter continued to perform, tour, and record, as well as search for new talent until she was diagnosed with pancreatic cancer in the summer of 1998. She died on September 26, 1998, at the age of 69. Her body was cremated and she was survived by her two sons.

== Legacy ==
Carter often recruited young accompanists for performances and recordings, insisting that she "learned a lot from these young players, because they're raw and they come up with things that I would never think about doing."

1993 was Carter's biggest year of innovation, creating a program called Jazz Ahead, which took 20 students who were given the opportunity to spend an entire week training and composing with Carter, a program that still exists and is hosted in The Kennedy Center.

== Discography ==
Year recorded	Album	Label	Personnel/Notes
1955	Meet Betty Carter and Ray Bryant	Columbia	With Ray Bryant Trio, Carter on 6 of the 12 tracks; reissued with bonus material
1956	Social Call	Columbia	With a big band led by Gigi Gryce on 5 previously unreleased tracks; this material first released in 1980 coupled with the 6 Meet Betty Carter tracks
1958	Out There with Betty Carter	Peacock	With a big band led by Gigi Gryce
1960	The Modern Sound of Betty Carter	ABC-Paramount	
1961	Ray Charles and Betty Carter	ABC-Paramount	With Ray Charles
1963	'Round Midnight	ATCO	
1964	Inside Betty Carter	United Artists	Reissued in 1993 on Capitol with 7 previously unreleased tracks from a 1965 session with Kenny Burrell
1970	At the Village Vanguard	Bet-Car/Verve	(MK 1001) live; originally titled Betty Carter
1975	Finally, Betty Carter	Roulette	Live; material recorded 1969
1975	Round Midnight	Roulette	Live; more material recorded from the same 1969 concert
1976	Now It's My Turn	Roulette	
1976	What a Little Moonlight Can Do	ABC/Impulse!	2-LP; reissues the Out There and The Modern Sound albums
1976	The Betty Carter Album	Bet-Car/Verve	(MK 1002)
1979	The Audience with Betty Carter	Bet-Car/Verve	(MK 1003) live; 2-LP
1982	Whatever Happened to Love?	Bet-Car/Verve	(MK 1004) live; Grammy nomination for Best Jazz Vocal Performance, Female
1987	The Carmen McRae – Betty Carter Duets	Bet-Car/Verve	Live, duo with Carmen McRae (vocals and piano); originally released on Great American Music Hall / Fantasy
1988	Look What I Got!	Bet-Car/Verve	Won the Grammy Award for Best Jazz Vocal Performance, Female
1989	Live at De Werf, Bruges, 1989	Caryout Productions	Live; released in 2020
1990	Droppin' Things	Bet-Car/Verve	Live; Grammy nomination for Best Jazz Vocal Performance, Female
1992	The Music Never Stops	Blue Engine	Live; released in 2019
1992	It's Not About the Melody	Bet-Car/Verve	
1993	Feed the Fire	Bet-Car/Verve	Live
1996	I'm Yours, You're Mine	Bet-Car/Verve	

=== CD compilations ===
- 1990: Compact Jazz (PolyGram) – Bet-Car and Verve recordings from 1976 to 1987
- 1992: I Can't Help It (Impulse!/GRP) – the Out There and The Modern Sound albums on one compact disc
- 1999: Priceless Jazz (GRP) – Peacock and ABC-Paramount recordings from 1958 and 1960
- 2003: Betty Carter's Finest Hour (Verve) – recordings from 1958 to 1992

==== On multi-artist compilations ====
- 1988: "I'm Wishing", Stay Awake: Various Interpretations of Music from Vintage Disney Films
- 1997: "Lonely House", September Songs – The Music of Kurt Weill
