= Joe Pass discography =

This article contains the discography of jazz guitarist Joe Pass as leader, sideman, and collaborator.

== As leader or co-leader ==
Release year	Album	Label
1962	Sounds of Synanon	Pacific Jazz
1963	Brasamba! with Bud Shank and Clare Fischer	Pacific Jazz
1963	Catch Me!	Pacific Jazz
1964	Joy Spring	Pacific Jazz
1964	For Django	Pacific Jazz
1965	A Sign of the Times	World Pacific
1967	The Stones Jazz	World Pacific
1967	Simplicity	Pacific Jazz
1970	Intercontinental	MPS
1973	Virtuoso	Pablo
1973	The Trio with Oscar Peterson and Niels-Henning Ørsted Pedersen	Pablo
1974	Live at Donte's	Pablo
1974	Jazz/Concord with Herb Ellis, Ray Brown and Jake Hanna	Concord Jazz
1974	Seven, Come Eleven with Herb Ellis	Concord Jazz
1974	Take Love Easy with Ella Fitzgerald	Pablo
1974	The Giants with Oscar Peterson and Ray Brown	Pablo
1974	Two for the Road with Herb Ellis	Pablo
1975	Oscar Peterson et Joe Pass à Salle Pleyel with Oscar Peterson	Pablo
1975	Portraits of Duke Ellington	Pablo
1975	Joe Pass at the Montreux Jazz Festival 1975	Pablo
1975	The Big 3 with Milt Jackson & Ray Brown	Pablo
1976	Porgy and Bess with Oscar Peterson	Pablo
1976	Virtuoso No. 2	Pablo
1976	Fitzgerald and Pass... Again with Ella Fitzgerald	Pablo
1977	Guitar Interludes	Discovery
1977	Quadrant with Milt Jackson, Ray Brown and Mickey Roker	Pablo
1977	Montreux '77 – Live	Pablo
1977	Virtuoso No. 3	Pablo
1978	The Paris Concert with Oscar Peterson and Niels-Henning Ørsted Pedersen	Pablo
1978	Tudo Bem! with Paulinho da Costa	Pablo
1979	Chops with Niels-Henning Ørsted Pedersen	Pablo
1979	Digital III at Montreux compilation of performances by Ella Fitzgerald, Count Basie and Joe Pass	Pablo
1979	I Remember Charlie Parker	Pablo
1979	Skol with Oscar Peterson, Stéphane Grappelli, Mickey Roker and Niels-Henning Ørsted Pedersen	Pablo
1980	Northsea Nights with Niels-Henning Ørsted Pedersen	Pablo
1980	Tivoli Gardens, Copenhagen, Denmark with Stéphane Grappelli and Niels-Henning Ørsted Pedersen	Pablo
1980	All Too Soon: The Duke Ellington Album with Milt Jackson, Ray Brown & Mickey Roker	Pablo
1981	Checkmate with Jimmy Rowles	Pablo
1981	Ira, George and Joe	Pablo
1982	Blues for 2 with Zoot Sims	Pablo
1982	Eximious with Niels-Henning Ørsted Pedersen	Pablo
1983	Virtuoso No. 4	Pablo
1983	Speak Love with Ella Fitzgerald	Pablo
1984	We'll Be Together Again with J. J. Johnson	Pablo
1984	Live at Long Beach City College	Pablo
1985	Whitestone	Pablo
1986	University of Akron Concert	Pablo
1986	Easy Living with Ella Fitzgerald	Pablo
1987	Sound Project with Tommy Gumina	Polytone
1988	Blues for Fred	Pablo
1988	One for My Baby	Pablo
1989	After Hours with André Previn and Ray Brown	Telarc
1990	Summer Nights	Pablo
1991	Appassionato	Pablo
1991	Duets with John Pisano	Pablo
1991	Virtuoso Live!	Pablo
1992	Love Walked In with Tommy Gumina	Polytone
1992	Six-String Santa	LaserLight
1992	Finally: Live in Stockholm with Red Mitchell	Verve
1992	Live at Yoshi's	Pablo
1993	My Song	Telarc
1994	Songs for Ellen	Pablo
1994	Roy Clark & Joe Pass Play Hank Williams with Roy Clark	Buster Ann
1997	Nuages (Live at Yoshi's, vol. 2)	Pablo
1998	Joe's Blues with Herb Ellis	Laserlight
1998	Unforgettable	Pablo
2000	Resonance	Pablo
2001	What Is There to Say	Pablo
2002	Meditation: Solo Guitar	Pablo
2004	Virtuoso in New York	Pablo

== Compilation ==
- 2001 The Complete Pacific Joe Pass Quartet Sessions

== As sideman ==
With Ella Fitzgerald

- 1973 Newport Jazz Festival: Live at Carnegie Hall
- 1974 Fine and Mellow
- 1974 Ella in London
- 1981 Ella Abraca Jobim
- 1982 The Best Is Yet to Come

With Richard "Groove" Holmes

- 1962 After Hours
- 1962 Somethin' Special
- 1966 Tell It Like It Tis

With Les McCann

- 1962 On Time
- 1963 Soul Hits

With Carmen McRae

- 1972 The Great American Songbook
- 1973 It Takes a Whole Lot of Human Feeling

With Oscar Peterson

- 1974 The Good Life
- 1975 The Oscar Peterson Big 6 at Montreux
- 1979 Night Child
- 1982 Face to Face, Peterson/Freddie Hubbard
- 1983 A Tribute to My Friends
- 1983 If You Could See Me Now
- 1986 Oscar Peterson Live!
- 1986 Time After Time
- 1986 Oscar Peterson + Harry Edison + Eddie "Cleanhead" Vinson
- 1986 Benny Carter Meets Oscar Peterson, Benny Carter/Peterson

With Gerald Wilson

- 1962 Moment of Truth
- 1963 Portraits
- 1965 On Stage
- 1968 Everywhere

With others

- 1962 Grab This!, Johnny Griffin
- 1963 Folk 'n' Flute, Bud Shank
- 1964 Stretchin' Out, The Crusaders
- 1965 All Through the Night: Julie London Sings the Choicest of Cole Porter, Julie London
- 1969 Reelin' with the Feelin', Charles Kynard
- 1969 The Original Cleanhead, Eddie "Cleanhead" Vinson
- 1970 Blood, Chet and Tears, Chet Baker
- 1971 Roger Kellaway Cello Quartet, Roger Kellaway
- 1972 Maestro, Moacir Santos
- 1974 Duke's Big 4, Duke Ellington Quartet
- 1974 Dizzy Gillespie's Big 4, Dizzy Gillespie
- 1975 Happy Time, Roy Eldridge
- 1975 Zoot Sims and the Gershwin Brothers, Zoot Sims
- 1976 The King, Benny Carter
- 1976 Carter, Gillespie Inc., Benny Carter and Dizzy Gillespie
- 1978 How Long Has This Been Going On?, Sarah Vaughan
- 1980 The Alternate Blues, Clark Terry, Freddie Hubbard, Dizzy Gillespie plus Oscar Peterson
- 1980 Memories of Duke, Clark Terry
- 1983 Mostly Blues...and Some Others, Count Basie
- 1988 My Kind of Trouble, Benny Carter
- 1989 Autumn Leaves, Tommy Gumina
