= Hark (album) =

Studio album by Buddy DeFranco
- Released: 1985
- Recorded: April 30, 1985
- Genre: Jazz
- Length: 44:22
- Label: Pablo
- Producer: Norman Granz

Buddy DeFranco chronology
On Tour: UK (1984)	Hark (1985)	Buddy De Franco Presents John Denman (1986)

Oscar Peterson chronology
If You Could See Me Now (1983)	Hark (1985)	Oscar Peterson Live! (1986)

Professional ratings
Review scores
Source	Rating
Allmusic	4.5/5 stars

Hark is a 1985 album by clarinetist Buddy DeFranco, featuring the pianist Oscar Peterson.

== Track listing ==
1. "All Too Soon" (Duke Ellington, Carl Sigman) – 7:05
2. "Summer Me, Winter Me" (Alan Bergman, Marilyn Bergman, Michel Legrand) – 5:03
3. "Llovisna (Light Rain)" (Buddy DeFranco) – 11:13
4. "By Myself" (Howard Dietz, Arthur Schwartz) – 5:15
5. "Joy Spring" (Clifford Brown) – 5:26
6. "This Is All I Ask" (Gordon Jenkins) – 5:09
7. "Hark" (DeFranco) – 6:33
8. "Why Am I" (Jim Gillis) – 4:19

== Personnel ==
=== Performance ===
- Buddy DeFranco – clarinet
- Oscar Peterson – piano
- Joe Pass – guitar
- Niels-Henning Ørsted Pedersen – double bass
- Martin Drew – drums
