= Porgy and Bess (Oscar Peterson and Joe Pass album) =

Studio album by Joe Pass, Oscar Peterson
- Released: 1976
- Recorded: January 26, 1976 at Group IV Recording Studios, Hollywood, Los Angeles, California
- Genre: Jazz
- Length: 41:47
- Label: Pablo
- Producer: Norman Granz

Oscar Peterson chronology
The Tenor Giants Featuring Oscar Peterson (1975)	Porgy and Bess (1976)	Roy Eldridge 4 - Montreux '77 (1977)

Joe Pass chronology
Fitzgerald and Pass... Again (1976)	Porgy and Bess (1976)	Virtuoso No. 3 (1977)

Porgy and Bess is a 1976 album by pianist Oscar Peterson and guitarist Joe Pass featuring music from George Gershwin's opera Porgy and Bess. This is the only album on which Peterson plays the clavichord.

== Critical reception ==
Professional ratings
Review scores
Source	Rating
AllMusic	3/5 stars
The Penguin Guide to Jazz Recordings	3/4 stars

AllMusic critic Scott Yanow wrote in his review: "The results are novel at first but rather limited on the whole, making one wonder whose bright idea this was."

== Track listing ==
All compositions by George Gershwin, with all lyrics by Ira Gershwin and DuBose Heyward, except otherwise noted.

1. "Summertime" - 4:27
2. "Bess, You Is My Woman Now" - 3:38
3. "My Man's Gone Now" - 3:07
4. "It Ain't Necessarily So" (George Gershwin, Ira Gershwin) - 3:30
5. "I Loves You Porgy" - 6:26
6. "I Got Plenty O' Nuttin'" - 3:02
7. "Oh Bess, Oh Where's My Bess?" - 5:32
8. "They Pass by Singin'" - 2:31
9. "There's a Boat Dat's Leavin' Soon for New York" - 3:54
10. "Strawberry Woman" - 5:40

== Charts ==
Chart (1976)	Position
Australia (Kent Music Report)	63

== Personnel ==
- Oscar Peterson - clavichord
- Joe Pass - acoustic guitar
- Norman Granz - producer

== See also ==
- Oscar Peterson Plays Porgy & Bess
