= The Oscar Peterson Big 6 at Montreux =

Live album by Oscar Peterson
- Released: 1975
- Recorded: July 16, 1975
- Genre: Jazz
- Length: 50:15
- Label: Pablo
- Producer: Norman Granz

Oscar Peterson chronology
Zoot Sims and the Gershwin Brothers (1975)	The Oscar Peterson Big 6 at Montreux (1975)	The Tenor Giants Featuring Oscar Peterson (1975)

Professional ratings
Review scores
Source	Rating
Allmusic	3/5 stars
The Penguin Guide to Jazz Recordings	3/4 stars

The Oscar Peterson Big 6 at Montreux is a 1975 live album featuring a jam session led by Oscar Peterson.

== Track listing ==
1. "Au Privave" (Charlie Parker) – 11:03
2. "Here's That Rainy Day" (Sonny Burke, Jimmy Van Heusen) – 10:09
3. "Poor Butterfly" (John Golden, Raymond Hubbell) – 15:34
4. "Reunion Blues" (Milt Jackson) – 13:29

== Personnel ==
Recorded July 16, 1975 at the Montreux Jazz Festival, Montreux, Switzerland:

=== Performance ===
- Oscar Peterson - piano
- Milt Jackson - vibraphone
- Toots Thielemans - harmonica
- Joe Pass - guitar
- Niels-Henning Ørsted Pedersen - double bass
- Louie Bellson - drums

=== Production ===
- Norman Granz - producer
- Jamie Putnam - art direction
- Phil Stern - photography
- Gilles Margerin - design
- Phil DeLancie - remastering
