= Happy Time (Roy Eldridge album) =

Studio album by Roy Eldridge
- Released: 1975
- Recorded: June 4, 1974
- Genre: Jazz
- Length: 47:30
- Label: Pablo
- Producer: Norman Granz

Roy Eldridge chronology
Jazz Maturity...Where It's Coming From (1975)	Happy Time (1975)	The Trumpet Kings at Montreux '75 (1975)

Professional ratings
Review scores
Source	Rating
AllMusic	2.5/5 stars
The Rolling Stone Jazz Record Guide	3/5 stars
The Penguin Guide to Jazz Recordings	3/4 stars

Happy Time is a 1975 studio album by the American jazz trumpeter Roy Eldridge.

== Track listing ==
1. "Sweethearts on Parade" (Carmen Lombardo, Charles Newman) – 4:20
2. "Willow Weep for Me" (Ann Ronell) – 7:01
3. "Makin' Whoopee" (Walter Donaldson, Gus Kahn) – 4:42
4. "Gee Baby, Ain't I Good to You" (Andy Razaf, Don Redman) – 3:33
5. "All of Me" (Gerald Marks, Seymour Simons) – 4:45
6. "I Want a Little Girl" (Murray Mencher, Billy Moll) – 4:10
7. "On the Sunny Side of the Street" (Dorothy Fields, Jimmy McHugh) – 6:55
8. "I Can't Get Started" (Vernon Duke, Ira Gershwin) – 4:43
9. "Call It Stormy Monday (But Tuesday Is Just as Bad)" (T-Bone Walker) – 5:18
10. "Let Me Off Uptown" (Earl Bostic, Redd Evans) – 3:04

== Personnel ==
=== Performance ===
- Roy Eldridge – trumpet, vocals
- Oscar Peterson – piano
- Joe Pass – guitar
- Ray Brown – [double bass
- Eddie Locke – drums

=== Production ===
- Phil DeLancie – digital mastering, remastering
- Phil Stern – photography
- Benny Green – liner notes
- Norman Granz – producer
