= Oscar Peterson + Harry Edison + Eddie "Cleanhead" Vinson =

Studio album by Oscar Peterson
- Released: 1987
- Recorded: November 12, 1986
- Studio: Ocean Way Studio, Hollywood, California
- Genre: Jazz
- Length: 46:12
- Label: Pablo
- Producer: Norman Granz

Oscar Peterson chronology
| Time After Time (1986) | Oscar Peterson + Harry Edison + Eddie "Cleanhead" Vinson (1987) | Benny Carter Meets Oscar Peterson (1986) |

Professional ratings
Review scores
| Source | Rating |
|---|---|
| Allmusic | 4.5/5 stars |

Oscar Peterson + Harry Edison + Eddie "Cleanhead" Vinson is an album by the jazz pianist Oscar Peterson accompanied by trumpeters Harry "Sweets" Edison and the alto saxophonist Eddie "Cleanhead" Vinson that was recorded in 1986.

== Reviews ==
The album was reviewed by Steve Hecox in Option magazine who was of the opinion that the album was "Yet another Norman Granz "let's put these guys together and see what happens" session." Hecox felt that the results were successful as they played to the performer's strengths with Peterson using his usual reliable three-piece rhythm section, and Eddie Vinson providing an instrumental session in which he stuck to alto sax.

== Track listing ==
1. "Stuffy" (Coleman Hawkins) – 9:13
2. "This One's for Jaws" (Miles Davis, Harry "Sweets" Edison) – 4:53
3. "Everything Happens to Me" (Tom Adair, Matt Dennis) – 4:36
4. "Broadway" (Billy Bird, Teddy McRae, Henri Woode) – 5:13
5. "Slooow Drag" (Edison, Joe Pass, Oscar Peterson, Eddie Vinson) – 10:36
6. "What's New?" (Bob Haggart, Johnny Burke) – 4:28
7. "Satin Doll" (Duke Ellington, Johnny Mercer, Billy Strayhorn) – 7:29

== Personnel ==
- Harry "Sweets" Edison – trumpet
- Eddie "Cleanhead" Vinson – alto saxophone
- Oscar Peterson – piano
- Joe Pass – guitar
- Dave Young – double bass
- Martin Drew – drums
