= Two of the Few =

Studio album by Oscar Peterson and Milt Jackson
- Released: 1983
- Recorded: January 20, 1983
- Genre: Jazz
- Length: 45:33
- Label: Pablo
- Producer: Norman Granz

Oscar Peterson chronology
Face to Face (1982)	Two of the Few (1983)	A Tribute to My Friends (1983)

Milt Jackson chronology
In London: Memories of Thelonious Sphere Monk (1982)	Two of the Few (1983)	Jackson, Johnson, Brown & Company (1983)

Professional ratings
Review scores
Source	Rating
AllMusic	4.5/5 stars
The Penguin Guide to Jazz Recordings	3/4 stars

Two of the Few is a 1983 studio album by pianist Oscar Peterson and vibraphonist Milt Jackson.

== Track listing ==
1. "Oh, Lady be Good!" (George Gershwin, Ira Gershwin) – 7:54
2. "If I Had You" (Jimmy Campbell, Reginald Connelly, Ted Shapiro) – 4:27
3. "Limehouse Blues" (Philip Braham, Douglas Furber) – 4:28
4. "Mister Basie" (Peterson) – 5:54
5. "Reunion Blues" (Jackson) – 5:12
6. "More Than You Know" (Vincent Youmans, Billy Rose, Edward Eliscu) – 6:35
7. "Just You, Just Me" (Jesse Greer, Raymond Klages) – 5:07
8. "Here's Two of the Few" (Jackson) – 5:56

== Personnel ==
- Oscar Peterson – piano
- Milt Jackson – vibes

== Production notes ==
- Norman Granz – producer
- Bob Simpson – engineer
