= The Paris Concert (Oscar Peterson album) =

Live album by Oscar Peterson
- Released: 1979
- Recorded: October 5, 1978
- Genre: Jazz
- Length: 89:17
- Label: Pablo
- Producer: Norman Granz

The Paris Concert is a live album by Oscar Peterson accompanied by bassist Niels-Henning Ørsted Pedersen and guitarist Joe Pass.

== Reception ==
Professional ratings
Review scores
Source	Rating
Allmusic	4/5 stars
The Rolling Stone Jazz Record Guide	3/5 stars
The Penguin Guide to Jazz Recordings	3/4 stars
DownBeat	4/5 stars

Writing for Allmusic, music critic Scott Yanow wrote of the CD reissue "[Peterson] mostly sticks to standards but includes three songs associated with Benny Goodman (including the riff-filled 'Benny's Bugle'), features Pass (who contributed his original 'Gentle Tears') unaccompanied on 'Lover Man' and really romps with his fellow virtuosoes on such numbers as 'Ornithology,' 'Donna Lee' and 'Sweet Georgia Brown.'"

DownBeat assigned the album 4 stars. Reviewer Bradley Sparrow wrote, "Peterson’s sound defies time, form and style; it is the product of extreme beauty, technique and love".

== Track listing ==
1. "Please Don't Talk About Me When I'm Gone" (Sidney Clare, Sam H. Stept) – 6:54
2. "Who Can I Turn To?" (Leslie Bricusse, Anthony Newley) – 8:09
3. "Benny's Bugle" (Benny Goodman) – 6:09
4. "Soft Winds" (Goodman, Fletcher Henderson) – 8:26
5. "Goodbye" (Gordon Jenkins) – 6:19
6. "Place St. Henri" (Oscar Peterson) – 5:01
7. Medley: "Manhã de Carnaval"/"If" (Luiz Bonfá)/(David Gates) – 9:33
8. "Ornithology" (Benny Harris, Charlie Parker) – 4:46
9. "Blue Lou" (Irving Mills, Edgar Sampson) – 3:28
10. "How Long Has This Been Going On?" (George Gershwin, Ira Gershwin) – 5:10
11. "Gentle Tears" (Joe Pass) – 6:33
12. "Lover Man (Oh Where Can You Be?)" (Jimmy Davis, Roger ("Ram") Ramirez, James Sherman) – 5:04
13. "Samba de Orfeu" (Bonfá, Antônio Maria) – 4:36
14. "Donna Lee" (Charlie Parker) – 2:45
15. "Sweet Georgia Brown" (Ben Bernie, Kenneth Casey, Maceo Pinkard) – 6:24

== Personnel ==
=== Performance ===
- Oscar Peterson – piano
- Joe Pass – guitar
- Niels-Henning Ørsted Pedersen – double bass
