= Ella and Oscar =

Studio album by Ella Fitzgerald
- Released: 1975
- Recorded: May 19, 1975
- Studio: Cherokee, Los Angeles, California
- Genre: Jazz
- Length: 44:10
- Label: Pablo
- Producer: Norman Granz

Ella Fitzgerald chronology
Ella in London (1974)	Ella and Oscar (1975)	Montreux '75 (1975)

Oscar Peterson chronology
Oscar Peterson and Clark Terry (1975)	Ella and Oscar (1975)	Jazz Maturity...Where It's Coming From (1975)

Professional ratings
Review scores
Source	Rating
AllMusic	4/5 stars
The Penguin Guide to Jazz Recordings	3.5/4 stars

Ella and Oscar is a 1975 album by Ella Fitzgerald, accompanied by pianist Oscar Peterson and, for the second half of the album, double bassist Ray Brown.

Fitzgerald's two previous albums with piano accompaniment were 1950's Ella Sings Gershwin (with Ellis Larkins) and 1960's Ella Fitzgerald Sings Songs from Let No Man Write My Epitaph with Paul Smith.

== Track listing ==
1. "Mean to Me" (Fred E. Ahlert, Roy Turk) – 3:30
2. "How Long Has This Been Going On?" (George Gershwin, Ira Gershwin) – 4:59
3. "When Your Lover Has Gone" (Einar Aaron Swan) – 4:58
4. "More Than You Know" (Edward Eliscu, Billy Rose, Vincent Youmans) – 4:37
5. "There's a Lull in My Life" (Mack Gordon, Harry Revel) – 4:58
6. "Midnight Sun" (Sonny Burke, Lionel Hampton, Johnny Mercer) – 3:40
7. "I Hear Music" (Burton Lane, Frank Loesser) – 5:12
8. "Street of Dreams" (Sam M. Lewis, Victor Young) – 4:08
9. "April in Paris" (Vernon Duke, Yip Harburg) – 8:37

== Personnel ==
- Ella Fitzgerald – vocals
- Oscar Peterson – piano
- Ray Brown – double bass
