= Bahiana =

Studio album by Dizzy Gillespie
- Released: 1976
- Recorded: November 19 & 20, 1975
- Studio: Los Angeles, California
- Genre: Jazz
- Length: 75:23
- Label: Pablo; 2625-708
- Producer: Norman Granz

Dizzy Gillespie chronology
The Trumpet Kings at Montreux '75 (1975)	Bahiana (1976)	Carter, Gillespie Inc. (1976)

Reissue cover

Bahiana is a 1976 double album by American jazz trumpeter Dizzy Gillespie recorded in 1975 and released on Pablo.

== Reception ==
Professional ratings
Review scores
Source	Rating
Allmusic	4/5 stars
The Rolling Stone Jazz Record Guide	5/5 stars
The Penguin Guide to Jazz Recordings	3/4 stars

Stewart Mason, in his review for AllMusic, called the album "one of Dizzy Gillespie's finest albums of the decade", commending the "richly expansive tunes [...] built on pure carnival rhythms".

Alun Morgan of Jazz Journal highlighted a "subtle interplay" between the jazzmen and Paulinho Da Costa. The journalist praised both the group as a whole, for their "control and sensitivity", and Dizzy Gillespie specifically, for his "exemplary" trumpet control.

== Track listing ==
All compositions by Dizzy Gillespie except as indicated

1. "Carnival" – 8:02
2. "Samba" (Mike Longo) – 9:41
3. "Barcelona" (Al Gafa) – 12:24
4. "In the Land of the Living Dead" (Gafa) – 10:34
5. "Behind the Moonbeam" (Gafa) – 7:35
6. "The Truth" (Longo) – 8:27
7. "Pele" (Gafa) – 7:15
8. "Olinga" – 20:00

== Personnel ==
- Dizzy Gillespie – trumpet
- Roger Glenn – flute, bass flute, vibraphone
- Al Gafa, Michael Howell – guitar
- Earl May – bass
- Mickey Roker – drums
- Paulinho Da Costa – percussion
