= Virtuoso in New York =

Studio album by Joe Pass
- Released: August 31, 2004
- Recorded: June 5–6, 1975 New York City
- Genre: Jazz
- Label: Pablo
- Producer: Norman Granz

Joe Pass chronology
Meditation: Solo Guitar (2002)	Virtuoso in New York (2004)

Professional ratings
Review scores
Source	Rating
All About Jazz	(favorable)
Allmusic	4/5 stars

Virtuoso in New York is an album by American jazz guitarist Joe Pass, recorded in 1975 and released posthumously in 2004.

== Track listing ==
1. "I Never Knew (That Roses Grew)" (Gus Kahn, Fiorito) – 3:02
2. "I Don't Stand a Ghost of a Chance with You" (Victor Young, Bing Crosby, Ned Washington) – 5:43
3. "We'll Be Together Again" (Frankie Laine, Carl Fischer) – 4:44
4. "Blues for Alagarn" (Joe Pass) – 6:31
5. "The Way You Look Tonight" (Jerome Kern, Dorothy Fields) – 6:22
6. "How Long Has This Been Going On? " (George Gershwin, Ira Gershwin) – 4:39
7. "Moritat" (Bertolt Brecht, Kurt Weill) – 5:52
8. "When Your Lover Has Gone" (Einar A. Swan) – 6:55
9. "Blues for Alagarn" (Pass) – 5:40

== Personnel ==
- Joe Pass – guitar
