= Fine and Mellow (Ella Fitzgerald album) =

Studio album by Ella Fitzgerald
- Released: 1979
- Recorded: January 8, 1974
- Genre: Jazz
- Length: 47:31
- Label: Pablo
- Producer: Norman Granz

Ella Fitzgerald chronology
Dream Dancing (1978)	Fine and Mellow (1979)	Digital III at Montreux (1979)

Professional ratings
Review scores
Source	Rating
AllMusic	3/5 stars
DownBeat	4/5 stars
The Penguin Guide to Jazz Recordings	2.5/4 stars
The Rolling Stone Jazz Record Guide	3/5 stars

Fine and Mellow is an album by Ella Fitzgerald, recorded in early 1974 but not released until 1979. The album won the Grammy Award for Best Jazz Vocal Album in 1980, Fitzgerald's second win in four years.

The album is subtitled Ella Fitzgerald Jams and represents a return to the informal jam sessions at the Jazz at the Philharmonic Concerts in the 1940s and 1950s. A review in Audio magazine called it "Ella's best album in years."

== Reception ==
DownBeat assigned the album 4 stars. Reviewer Douglas Clark wrote, "Relaxed is the word for this recording. The session seems as informal and friendly as a Sunday afternoon cookout. The musical fare is as basic as barbeque—no exotic dishes here—but it’s all very tasty and enjoyable . . . It is as mainstream as the Mississippi. But there is a fine sense of fun here, the comfortable feeling of people who are having a good time.".

== Track listing ==
1. "Fine and Mellow" (Billie Holiday) – 6:05
2. "I'm Just a Lucky So-and-So" (Mack David, Duke Ellington) – 6:35
3. "I Don't Stand a Ghost of a Chance with You" (Bing Crosby, Ned Washington, Victor Young) – 5:01
4. "Rockin' in Rhythm" (Harry Carney, Ellington, Irving Mills) – 6:00
5. "I'm in the Mood for Love" (Dorothy Fields, Jimmy McHugh) – 3:15
6. "'Round Midnight" (Bernie Hanighen, Thelonious Monk, Cootie Williams) – 4:37
7. "I Can't Give You Anything But Love" (Fields, McHugh) – 4:10
8. "The Man I Love" (George Gershwin, Ira Gershwin) – 6:45
9. "Polka Dots and Moonbeams" (Johnny Burke, Jimmy Van Heusen) – 5:03

== Personnel ==
Recorded January 8, 1974, in Hollywood, Los Angeles:

- Ella Fitzgerald - vocals
- Harry Edison - trumpet
- Clark Terry - trumpet, flugelhorn
- Zoot Sims - tenor saxophone
- Eddie 'Lockjaw' Davis
- Joe Pass - guitar
- Tommy Flanagan - piano
- Ray Brown - double bass
- Louie Bellson - drums
