= Resonance (Joe Pass album) =

Live album by Joe Pass
- Released: 2000
- Recorded: December 1974
- Venue: Donte's, Los Angeles
- Genre: Jazz, Bop
- Label: Pablo
- Producer: Eric Miller

Joe Pass chronology
Unforgettable (1998)	Resonance (2000)	What Is There to Say (2001)

Professional ratings
Review scores
Source	Rating
Allmusic	4.5/5 stars
JazzTimes	(favorable)

Resonance is a live album by jazz guitarist Joe Pass, recorded in 1974 and released posthumously in 2000. It was recorded during the same performances as Live at Donte's.

== Reception ==
Jim Ferguson (JazzTimes) wrote in his review of Resonance: "...the mercurial Pass turns tunes like "It Could Happen to You" (often given a ballad treatment) and Jobim's "Corcovado" into rousing, near-frantic tour de forces, where he establishes a brisk tempo and proceeds to tattoo variation after variation. He does eventually settle down, however, to play sweet and smooth on "Too Late Now" and "Misty," each of which features Pass' unmistakable combination of smooth single-note lines and silken chordal passages....Another look back at a brilliant performance from one of jazz's most unforgettable players."

== Track listing ==
No.	Title	Writer(s)	Length
1.	"It Could Happen to You"	Johnny Burke, Jimmy Van Heusen	5:26
2.	"Corcovado"	Antônio Carlos Jobim	5:31
3.	"Too Late Now"	Burton Lane, Alan Jay Lerner	4:30
4.	"How Deep Is the Ocean?"	Irving Berlin	7:11
5.	"Come Rain or Come Shine"	Harold Arlen, Johnny Mercer	7:41
6.	"The Lamp Is Low"	Peter DeRose, Mitchell Parish, Maurice Ravel, Bert Shefter	5:44
7.	"Yardbird Suite"	Charlie Parker	5:00
8.	"N.E.C. Blues"	Pass	5:56
9.	"Misty"	Erroll Garner, Johnny Burke	2:51
10.	"Bloos for Baby B"	Pass	11:36

== Personnel ==
- Joe Pass – guitar
- Jim Hughart – electric bass
- Frank Severino – drums
