= Soprano Sax (Zoot Sims album) =

Studio album by Zoot Sims
- Released: 1976
- Recorded: January 6 & 9, 1976
- Studio: RCA, New York, NY
- Genre: Jazz
- Length: 47:49
- Label: Pablo; 2310 770
- Producer: Norman Granz

Zoot Sims chronology
| Zoot Sims and the Gershwin Brothers (1975) | Soprano Sax (1976) | Hawthorne Nights (1976) |

Soprano Sax is an album by saxophonist Zoot Sims, recorded in 1976 and released by the Pablo label.

== Reception ==
Professional ratings
Review scores
| Source | Rating |
|---|---|
| AllMusic | 3.5/5 stars |
| The Penguin Guide to Jazz Recordings | 3/4 stars |

AllMusic reviewer Scott Yanow stated, "Zoot Sims, known throughout his career as a hard-swinging tenor-saxophonist, started doubling successfully on soprano in 1973 and managed to become one of the best by simply playing in his own musical personality. This particular LP was his only full-length set on soprano but it is a rewarding one... A delightful set of swinging jazz, it's a surprise success".

== Track listing ==
1. "Someday Sweetheart" (John Spikes, Reb Spikes) – 6:00
2. "Moonlight in Vermont" (Karl Suessdorf, John Blackburn) – 4:40
3. "Wrap Your Troubles in Dreams (and Dream Your Troubles Away)" (Harry Barris, Ted Koehler) – 5:04
4. "Blues for Louise" (Zoot Sims) – 6:58
5. "Willow Weep for Me" (Ann Ronell) – 6:32
6. "Wrap Up" (Sims) – 3:41
7. "(I Don't Stand) A Ghost of a Chance with You" (Victor Young, Ned Washington, Bing Crosby) – 7:00
8. "Baubles, Bangles and Beads" (Alexander Borodin, George Forrest, Robert Wright) – 4:43

== Personnel ==
- Zoot Sims – soprano saxophone
- Ray Bryant – piano
- George Mraz – bass
- Grady Tate – drums
