= The Dizzy Gillespie Big 7 at the Montreux Jazz Festival =

Live album by Dizzy Gillespie
- Released: 1975
- Recorded: July 16, 1975
- Venue: Montreux Jazz Festival, Montreux, Switzerland
- Genre: Jazz
- Length: 39:57
- Label: Pablo; 2310-749
- Producer: Norman Granz

Dizzy Gillespie chronology
| Afro-Cuban Jazz Moods (1975) | The Dizzy Gillespie Big 7 at the Montreux Jazz Festival (1975) | The Trumpet Kings at Montreux '75 (1975) |

Dizzy LP Cover

The Dizzy Gillespie Big 7 at the Montreux Jazz Festival is a live album by Dizzy Gillespie recorded at the Montreux Jazz Festival on July 16th, 1975 and released on the Pablo later that year.

== Reception ==
The AllMusic review called the album a "good but not great set... There are many moments that elicit grins of pleasure, but none that cause jaws to gape with astonishment".

Professional ratings
Review scores
| Source | Rating |
|---|---|
| AllMusic | 3/5 stars |
| The Rolling Stone Jazz Record Guide | 3/5 stars |

== Track listing ==
1. "Lover, Come Back to Me" (Oscar Hammerstein II, Sigmund Romberg) – 16:43
2. "I'll Remember April" (Gene de Paul, Patricia Johnston, Don Raye) – 16:02 Bonus track on CD reissue
3. "What's New?" (Johnny Burke, Bob Haggart) – 12:13
4. "Cherokee" (Ray Noble) – 11:01

== Personnel ==
- Dizzy Gillespie – trumpet
- Eddie "Lockjaw" Davis, Johnny Griffin – tenor saxophone
- Milt Jackson – vibraphone
- Tommy Flanagan – piano
- Niels-Henning Ørsted Pedersen – bass
- Mickey Roker – drums
