= The Giants (album) =

Studio album by Oscar Peterson, Joe Pass, Ray Brown
- Released: 1977
- Recorded: December 7, 1974
- Genre: Jazz
- Length: 48:17
- Label: Pablo
- Producer: Norman Granz

Oscar Peterson chronology
Satch and Josh (1974)	The Giants (1977)	Oscar Peterson and Roy Eldridge (1974)

Joe Pass chronology
Portraits of Duke Ellington (1974)	The Giants (1977)	Live at Donte's (1974)

Professional ratings
Review scores
Source	Rating
Allmusic	4/5 stars
The Penguin Guide to Jazz Recordings	3/4 stars

The Giants is a 1974 album featuring Oscar Peterson, Joe Pass, and Ray Brown. At the Grammy Awards of 1978, Peterson won the Grammy Award for Best Jazz Performance by a Soloist for his performance on this album. It was reissued on CD in 1995 by Original Jazz Classics.

== Track listing ==
1. "Riff Blues" (Oscar Peterson) – 4:24
2. "Who Cares?" (George Gershwin, Ira Gershwin) – 6:29
3. "Jobim" (Joe Pass, Peterson) – 6:29
4. "Blues for Dennis" (Peterson) – 5:31
5. "Sunny" (Bobby Hebb) – 4:49
6. "I'm Getting Sentimental Over You" (George Bassman, Ned Washington) – 7:22
7. "Caravan" (Duke Ellington, Irving Mills, Juan Tizol) – 6:34
8. "Eyes of Love" (Quincy Jones, Bob Russell) – 6:53

== Personnel ==
- Oscar Peterson – piano & organ
- Joe Pass – guitar
- Ray Brown - double bass

== Chart positions ==
Year	Chart	Position
1977	Billboard Jazz Albums	33
