= The King (Benny Carter album) =

Studio album by Benny Carter
- Released: 1976
- Recorded: February 11, 1976
- Studio: RCA Studios, Los Angeles, CA
- Genre: Jazz
- Length: 51:02
- Label: Pablo; 2310 768
- Producer: Norman Granz

Benny Carter chronology
Additions to Further Definitions (1966)	The King (1976)	Carter, Gillespie Inc. (1976)

The King is an album by saxophonist/composer Benny Carter recorded in 1976 and released by the Pablo label.

== Reception ==
Professional ratings
Review scores
Source	Rating
AllMusic	3/5 stars
The Penguin Guide to Jazz	3.5/4 stars

AllMusic reviewer Scott Yanow stated "The great Benny Carter was so much in demand as an arranger/composer in the studios that for 15 years, starting in the early '60s, he rarely recorded or performed in jazz settings, instead choosing to concentrate on writing movie scores. ... As The King (his first small-group session since 1966) proves, the masterful altoist had not lost a thing through the years. ... Benny Carter is in masterful form, stretching out on eight of his own compositions and showing that his name always has to be ranked near the top of jazz improvisers, whether one is considering the 1930s or the 1990s".

== Track listing ==
All compositions by Benny Carter except where noted

1. "A Walkin' Thing" – 6:18
2. "My Kind of Trouble Is You" (Carter, Paul Vandervoort II) – 4:35
3. "Easy Money" – 6:16
4. "Blue Star" – 8:05
5. "I Still Love Him So" – 6:42
6. "Green Wine" (Carter, Leonard Feather) – 6:45
7. "Malibu" – 4:25
8. "Blues in D Flat" – 7:56

== Personnel ==
- Benny Carter – alto saxophone
- Milt Jackson – vibraphone
- Joe Pass – guitar
- Tommy Flanagan – piano
- John B. Williams – bass
- Jake Hanna – drums
