= Sophisticated Lady (disambiguation) =

"Sophisticated Lady" is a jazz standard.

Sophisticated Lady may also refer to:

- Sophisticated Lady (Ella Fitzgerald and Joe Pass album)
- Sophisticated Lady (Julie London album)
- "Sophisticated Lady", a 1971 song by REO Speedwagon from R.E.O. Speedwagon

== See also ==
- Sophisticated Lady (She's a Different Lady), a song originally recorded by R&B artist Natalie Cole
