= Ella in London =

Live album by Ella Fitzgerald
- Released: 1974
- Recorded: April 11, 1974
- Genre: Jazz
- Length: 46:46
- Label: Pablo
- Producer: Norman Granz

Ella Fitzgerald chronology
Take Love Easy (1974)	Ella in London (1974)	Ella and Oscar (1975)

Professional ratings
Review scores
Source	Rating
AllMusic	4.5/5 stars
The Penguin Guide to Jazz Recordings	3.5/4 stars
The Rolling Stone Jazz Record Guide	3/5 stars

Ella in London is a 1974 live album by the American singer Ella Fitzgerald, accompanied by a quartet led by the pianist Tommy Flanagan.

It is significant as Fitzgerald's only live album recorded in England, although a decade earlier she had recorded four songs for her 1964 album Hello, Dolly! in London. This live date was recorded at Ronnie Scott's Jazz Club in Soho, London.

== Track listing ==
1. "Sweet Georgia Brown" (Ben Bernie, Kenneth Casey, Maceo Pinkard) – 3:15
2. "They Can't Take That Away from Me" (George Gershwin, Ira Gershwin) – 4:12
3. "Ev'ry Time We Say Goodbye" (Cole Porter) – 2:57
4. "The Man I Love" (G. Gershwin, I. Gershwin) – 8:10
5. "It Don't Mean a Thing (If It Ain't Got That Swing)" (Duke Ellington, Irving Mills) – 7:25
6. "You've Got a Friend" (Carole King) – 6:46
7. "Lemon Drop" (George Wallington) – 3:48
8. "The Very Thought of You" (Ray Noble) – 4:13
9. "Happy Blues" (Ella Fitzgerald) – 6:00

== Personnel ==
Recorded April 11, 1974, at Ronnie Scott's, London, England:

- Ella Fitzgerald - vocals
- Tommy Flanagan Quartet:
  - Tommy Flanagan - piano
  - Joe Pass - guitar
  - Keter Betts - double bass
  - Bobby Durham - drums
