= Northsea Nights =

Live album by Joe Pass and Niels-Henning Ørsted Pedersen
- Released: 1980
- Recorded: July 1979
- Venue: Northsea Jazz Festival, The Hague, Netherlands
- Genre: Jazz
- Length: 45:25
- Label: Pablo
- Producer: Norman Granz

Joe Pass chronology
I Remember Charlie Parker (1979)	Northsea Nights (1980)	Checkmate (1981)

Professional ratings
Review scores
Source	Rating
Allmusic	4/5 stars
The Rolling Stone Jazz Record Guide	3/5 stars

Northsea Nights is a live album by American jazz guitarist Joe Pass and double bassist Niels-Henning Ørsted Pedersen that was released in 1980.

== Track listing ==
1. "If I Were a Bell" (Frank Loesser) – 7:02
2. "'Round Midnight" (Thelonious Monk, Cootie Williams) – 9:28
3. "How Deep is the Ocean?" (Irving Berlin) – 6:12
4. "Stella by Starlight" (Victor Young, Ned Washington) – 8:38
5. "I Can't Get Started" (Ira Gershwin, Vernon Duke) – 7:08
6. "Blues for the Hague" (Joe Pass, Niels-Henning Ørsted Pedersen) – 6:57

== Personnel ==
- Joe Pass – guitar
- Niels-Henning Ørsted Pedersen – double bass

== Chart positions ==
Year	Chart	Position
1980	Billboard Jazz Albums	41
