= Nuages (Live at Yoshi's, vol. 2) =

Live album by Joe Pass
- Released: May 5, 1997
- Recorded: January 30 – February 1, 1992
- Venue: Yoshi's, Oakland, California
- Studio: Mixed and mastered at Fantasy Studios, Berkeley, California
- Genre: Jazz
- Length: 47:15
- Label: Pablo Records
- Producer: Eric Miller

Joe Pass chronology
Roy Clark & Joe Pass Play Hank Williams (1994)	Nuages (Live at Yoshi's, vol. 2) (1997)	Joe's Blues (1998)

Nuages (Live at Yoshi's, vol. 2) is a live album by jazz guitarist Joe Pass that was released in 1997.

== Reception ==
Professional ratings
Review scores
Source	Rating
Allmusic	4.5/5 stars
The Penguin Guide to Jazz Recordings	3/4 stars

Writing for Allmusic, music critic Richard S. Ginell wrote "Far from being a casual collection of rejects, there is plenty of mellow gold from Joe Pass on this posthumously released second volume from what must have been a memorable gig at this Oakland, California night spot."

== Track listing ==
No.	Title	Writer(s)	Length
1.	"I Remember You"	Victor Schertzinger, Johnny Mercer	5:38
2.	"Repetition"	Neal Hefti	4:43
3.	"September Song"	Kurt Weill, Maxwell Anderson	4:24
4.	"Nuages"	Django Reinhardt, Jacques Larue	4:58
5.	"If I Had You"	Jimmy Campbell and Reginald Connelly, Ted Shapiro	3:59
6.	"Love Letters"	Victor Young, Edward Heyman	5:03
7.	"What Is This Thing Called Love"	Cole Porter	6:11
8.	"Blues for the Weasel"	Joe Pass	6:29
9.	"Cherokee"	Ray Noble	5:50

== Personnel ==
- Joe Pass – guitar
- John Pisano – acoustic guitar, electric guitar
- Monty Budwig – bass
- Colin Bailey – drums

Production & other

- Eric Miller – producer
- David Luke – engineer, mixing
- Andrew Niedzwiecki – assistant engineer
- George Horn – mastering
- Dan Ouellette – liner notes
- Jamie Putnam – art direction
- Gilles Margerin – design
- Takao Miyakaka – photography
