= Meditation: Solo Guitar =

Live album by Joe Pass
- Released: October 1, 2002
- Recorded: January 30–February 1, 1992 at Yoshi's, Oakland, CA
- Genre: Jazz, Bop
- Label: Pablo
- Producer: Eric Miller

Joe Pass chronology
What Is There to Say (2001)	Meditation: Solo Guitar (2002)	Virtuoso in New York (2004)

Professional ratings
Review scores
Source	Rating
All About Jazz	(favorable)
Allmusic	4/5 stars

Meditation: Solo Guitar is a live album by jazz guitarist Joe Pass, recorded in 1992 and released posthumously in 2002.

== Reception ==
Regarding Meditation, Jim Ferguson wrote (in JazzTimes): "In Pass' hands, no tune seemed to elude performance, and he tackled everything--from bebop numbers to waltzes to standards to Latin pieces--with astonishing ease and effectiveness, something that is amply evident throughout this set...highlights include a pensive rubato treatment of "Shadow Waltz," a slowly grooving "Mood Indigo" and a swinging "They Can't Take That Away From Me," whose title reflects a sentiment that applies to Pass' position at the very top of the list of the world's finest jazz guitarists."

== Track listing ==
1. "Meditation (Meditação)" (Antônio Carlos Jobim, Newton Mendonça, Norman Gimbel) – 4:52
2. "Shadow Waltz" (Al Dubin, Harry Warren) – 2:05
3. "Mood Indigo" (Duke Ellington, Irving Mills, Barney Bigard) – 3:24
4. "More Than You Know" (Vincent Youmans, Edward Eliscu, Billy Rose) – 3:52
5. "When Your Lover Has Gone" (Einar A. Swan) – 6:41
6. "Everything Happens to Me" (Tom Adair, Matt Dennis) – 4:41
7. "It's All Right With Me" (Cole Porter) – 4:51
8. "I'll Never Be The Same" (Matty Malneck, Frank Signorelli, Gus Kahn) – 4:59
9. "You Stepped Out of a Dream" (Nacio Herb Brown, Gus Kahn) – 3:54
10. "All the Things You Are" (Oscar Hammerstein II, Jerome Kern) – 4:06
11. "How Deep Is the Ocean?" (Irving Berlin) – 6:29
12. "They Can't Take That Away from Me" (George Gershwin, Ira Gershwin) – 2:42

== Personnel ==
- Joe Pass – guitar
