= Oscar Peterson in Russia =

Live album by Oscar Peterson
- Released: 1975 (Japan)
- Recorded: November 17, 1974
- Genre: Jazz
- Length: 86:39
- Label: Pablo
- Producer: Norman Granz

Professional ratings
Review scores
| Source | Rating |
|---|---|
| Allmusic | 4/5 stars |
| The Rolling Stone Jazz Record Guide | 2/5 stars |
| The Penguin Guide to Jazz Recordings | 3/4 stars |

Oscar Peterson in Russia is a live album by Oscar Peterson, accompanied by Niels-Henning Ørsted Pedersen and Jake Hanna, recorded in Tallinn, Estonia, then part of the Soviet Union.

== Track listing ==
1. "I Got It Bad (and That Ain't Good)" (Duke Ellington, Paul Francis Webster) – 4:29
2. "I Concentrate on You" (Cole Porter) – 4:28
3. "Place St. Henri" (Oscar Peterson) – 6:06
4. "Hogtown Blues" (Peterson) – 3:06
5. "On Green Dolphin Street" (Bronislaw Kaper, Ned Washington) – 5:59
6. "You Stepped Out of a Dream" (Nacio Herb Brown, Gus Kahn) – 5:44
7. "Wave" (Antonio Carlos Jobim) – 5:17
8. "On the Trail" (Harold Adamson, Ferde Grofé) – 5:01
9. "Take the "A" Train" (Billy Strayhorn) – 4:31
10. "Summertime" (George Gershwin, Ira Gershwin, DuBose Heyward) – 4:51
11. "Just Friends" (John Klenner, Sam M. Lewis) – 5:09
12. "Do You Know What It Means to Miss New Orleans?" (Louis Alter, Eddie DeLange) – 3:25
13. Medley: "I Loves You Porgy"/"Georgia on My Mind" (G. Gershwin, I. Gershwin, Heyward)/(Hoagy Carmichael, Stuart Gorrell) – 3:45
14. "Lil' Darlin'" (Neal Hefti) – 6:33
15. "Watch What Happens" (Jacques Demy, Norman Gimbel, Michel Legrand) – 7:59
16. "Hallelujah Trail" (Peterson) – 6:35
17. "Someone to Watch over Me" (G. Gershwin, I. Gershwin) – 3:41

== Personnel ==
Performance

- Oscar Peterson – piano
- Niels-Henning Ørsted Pedersen – double bass
- Jake Hanna - drums
