= Dizzy Gillespie's Big 4 =

Studio album by Dizzy Gillespie
- Released: 1975
- Recorded: September 17 & 19, 1974; Los Angeles, California
- Genre: Jazz
- Length: 44:38
- Label: Pablo; 2310-719
- Producer: Norman Granz

Dizzy Gillespie chronology
The Source (1974)	Dizzy Gillespie's Big 4 (1975)	The Trumpet Kings Meet Joe Turner (1974)

Dizzy's Big 4 Cover

Dizzy Gillespie's Big 4 (also released as Dizzy's Big 4) is an album by Dizzy Gillespie recorded in 1974 and released on the Pablo label.

== Reception ==
The AllMusic review called the album "easily one of Dizzy Gillespie's best small-group recordings from the latter portion of his career".

Professional ratings
Review scores
Source	Rating
AllMusic	4.5/5 stars
The Penguin Guide to Jazz Recordings	3.5/4 stars
The Rolling Stone Jazz Record Guide	5/5 stars

== Track listing ==
All compositions by Dizzy Gillespie except as indicated

1. "Frelimo" - 8:14
2. "Hurry Home" (Buddy Bernier, Joseph Meyer, Robert D. Emmerich) - 6:24
3. "Russian Lullaby" (Irving Berlin) - 6:51
4. "Be Bop (Dizzy's Fingers)" - 4:31
5. "Birks' Works" - 8:55
6. "September Song" (Maxwell Anderson, Kurt Weill) - 2:48
7. "Jitterbug Waltz" (Fats Waller) - 6:55

== Personnel ==
- Dizzy Gillespie - trumpet
- Joe Pass - guitar
- Ray Brown - bass
- Mickey Roker - drums
