= What Is There to Say =

Live album by Joe Pass
- Released: 2001
- Recorded: 13–14 September 1990
- Venue: Vine Street Bar and Grill, Hollywood, California
- Genre: Jazz, Bop
- Label: Pablo
- Producer: Eric Miller

Joe Pass chronology
Resonance (2000)	What Is There to Say (2001)	Meditation: Solo Guitar (2002)

Professional ratings
Review scores
Source	Rating
Allmusic	4/5 stars
The Penguin Guide to Jazz Recordings	3/4 stars

What Is There to Say (or more completely, What Is There to Say: Joe Pass Solo Guitar) is a live album by jazz guitarist Joe Pass, recorded in 1990 and released posthumously in 2001.

== Track listing ==
1. "Django" (John Lewis) – 5:02
2. "Old Folks" (Willard Robison, Dedette Lee Hill) – 4:13
3. "I Concentrate on You" (Cole Porter) – 4:04
4. "I'll Be Around" (Alec Wilder) – 5:01
5. "They Can't Take That Away from Me" (George Gershwin, Ira Gershwin) – 4:02
6. "Medley: It's All in the Game/Yesterdays" (Carl Sigman, Charles Dawes, Otto Harbach, Jerome Kern) – 6:29
7. "Come Rain or Come Shine" (Harold Arlen, Johnny Mercer) – 4:30
8. "On Green Dolphin Street" (Bronisław Kaper, Ned Washington) – 7:01
9. "What Is There to Say?" (Vernon Duke, E. Y. "Yip" Harburg) – 6:44
10. "Nobody Else But Me" (Oscar Hammerstein II, Jerome Kern) – 5:17
11. "Lush Life" (Billy Strayhorn) – 7:15

== Personnel ==
- Joe Pass – guitar
