= Chops (Joe Pass album) =

Studio album by Joe Pass and Niels-Henning Ørsted Pedersen
- Released: 1979
- Recorded: November 19, 1978
- Studio: Chappell, London
- Genre: Jazz
- Length: 50:24
- Label: Pablo
- Producer: Norman Granz

Joe Pass chronology
Tudo Bem! (1978)	Chops (1979)	I Remember Charlie Parker (1979)

Chops is an album by the American jazz guitarist Joe Pass and the Danish double bassist Niels-Henning Ørsted Pedersen, released in 1979.

== Reception ==
Professional ratings
Review scores
Source	Rating
AllMusic	4.5/5 stars
The Penguin Guide to Jazz Recordings	3.5/4 stars
The Rolling Stone Jazz Record Guide	4/5 stars

For AllMusic, critic Scott Yanow wrote that "Pass in particular sounds stimulated during this session and comes up with some of his hottest playing."

== Track listing ==
1. "Have You Met Miss Jones?" (Richard Rodgers, Lorenz Hart) – 5:00
2. "Oleo" (Sonny Rollins) – 5:07
3. "Lover Man" (Jimmy Davis, Roger "Ram" Ramirez, Jimmy Sherman) – 5:35
4. "L5 Blues" (Joe Pass, Niels-Henning Ørsted Pedersen) – 5:09
5. "Come Rain or Come Shine" (Harold Arlen, Johnny Mercer) – 4:20
6. "Quiet Nights of Quiet Stars" (Antônio Carlos Jobim, Gene Lees) – 5:16
7. "Tricrotism" (Oscar Pettiford) – 6:05
8. "Old Folks" (Dedette Lee Hill, Willard Robison) – 4:48
9. "Yardbird Suite" (Charlie Parker) – 3:34
10. "In Your Own Sweet Way" (Dave Brubeck) – 5:30

== Personnel ==
- Joe Pass – guitar
- Niels-Henning Ørsted Pedersen – double bass

Technical

- Robert Golding – engineer
- Phil Stern – photography
