= I Remember Charlie Parker =

Studio album by Joe Pass
- Released: 1979
- Recorded: February 17, 1979
- Studio: Group lV Studios, Hollywood
- Genre: Jazz
- Length: 48:30
- Label: Pablo Today
- Producer: Norman Granz

Joe Pass chronology
Chops (1979)	I Remember Charlie Parker (1979)	Northsea Nights (1980)

Professional ratings
Review scores
Source	Rating
AllMusic	4/5 stars
The Penguin Guide to Jazz Recordings	3/4 stars
The Rolling Stone Jazz Record Guide	4/5 stars

I Remember Charlie Parker is a 1979 album by American jazz guitarist Joe Pass. A solo-guitar tribute to jazz musician Charlie Parker, it was re-issued in 1991 on CD by Original Jazz Classics.

== Track listing ==
1. "Just Friends" (John Klenner, Sam M. Lewis) – 4:26
2. "Easy to Love" (Cole Porter) – 4:00
3. "Summertime" (George Gershwin, Ira Gershwin, DuBose Heyward) – 4:09
4. "April in Paris" (Vernon Duke, E. Y. Harburg) – 4:05
5. "Everything Happens to Me" (Tom Adair, Matt Dennis) – 4:32
6. "Laura" (Johnny Mercer, David Raksin) – 4:10
7. "They Can't Take That Away from Me" (George Gershwin, Ira Gershwin) – 4:43
8. "I Didn't Know What Time It Was" (Richard Rodgers, Lorenz Hart) – 4:40
9. "If I Should Lose You" (Ralph Rainger, Leo Robin) – 4:34
10. "Out of Nowhere (Concept I)" (Johnny Green, Edward Heyman) – 5:19
11. "Out of Nowhere (Concept II)" (Johnny Green, Edward Heyman) – 3:52

== Personnel ==
- Joe Pass - guitar
- Val Valentin – engineer

== Chart positions ==
Year	Chart	Position
1980	Billboard Jazz Albums	31
