= Tivoli Gardens, Copenhagen, Denmark =

Live album by Stéphane Grappelli
- Released: 1980
- Genre: Jazz
- Length: 45:00
- Label: Pablo
- Producer: Norman Granz

Stéphane Grappelli chronology
Stephane Grappelli '80 (1980)	Tivoli Gardens, Copenhagen, Denmark (1980)	Strictly For The Birds (1980)

Tivoli Gardens, Copenhagen, Denmark is an album by jazz violinist Stéphane Grappelli, recorded live in 1979 and released in 1980.

== Reception ==
Professional ratings
Review scores
Source	Rating
AllMusic	4/5 stars
The Penguin Guide to Jazz Recordings	4/4 stars

Writing for AllMusic, music critic Scott Yanow wrote of the album "By the time the 71-year-old Stephane Grappelli made this live trio recording with guitarist Joe Pass and bassist Niels-Henning Orsted Pedersen, his legacy as the greatest of all jazz violinists was firmly in place.[...] The program itself is practically a Grapelli greatest-hits collection -- "It's Only a Paper Moon," "Crazy Rhythm," "How Deep Is the Ocean," etc. -- which makes this disc a perfect introduction to his art for anyone looking for a good place to begin. Highly recommended."

An article on allaboutjazz.com states "A live concert of a small group that swings very big has been preserved for our enjoyment. These musicians play strongly and immaculately cohesive. If you like music that really swings with melody that sings and floats, you'll love this album. "

The Penguin Guide to Jazz selected this album as part of its suggested Core Collection.

== Track-Listing ==
No.	Title	Writer(s)	Length
1.	"It's Only A Paper Moon"	Harold Arlen, Yip Harburg, Billy Rose	3:52
2.	"Time After Time"	Sammy Cahn, Jule Styne	5:13
3.	"Let's Fall In Love"	Harold Arlen, Ted Koehler	4:22
4.	"Crazy Rhythm"	Irving Caesar, Joseph Meyer, Roger Wolfe Kahn	3:32
5.	"How Deep Is The Ocean"	Irving Berlin	6:07
6.	"I'll Remember April"	Gene de Paul, Patricia Johnston, Don Raye	7:22
7.	"I Can't Get Started"	Ira Gershwin, Vernon Duke	6:58
8.	"I Get A Kick Out Of You"	Cole Porter	5:40
Total length:			43:06

== Personnel ==
- Stéphane Grappelli – violin
- Joe Pass – guitar
- Niels-Henning Ørsted Pedersen – double bass
