= The Best Is Yet to Come (Ella Fitzgerald album) =

Studio album by Ella Fitzgerald
- Released: 1982
- Recorded: February 4, 5, 1982
- Genre: Jazz
- Length: 40:11
- Label: Pablo Today
- Producer: Norman Granz

Ella Fitzgerald chronology
Ella Abraça Jobim (1981)	The Best Is Yet to Come (1982)	Speak Love (1983)

The Best Is Yet to Come is a 1982 studio album by the American jazz singer Ella Fitzgerald, accompanied by a studio orchestra arranged and conducted by Nelson Riddle.

The last of Fitzgerald's seven collaborations with Riddle, their work together on the Verve label more than fifteen years earlier is considered some of Fitzgerald's finest, both musically and critically.

Fitzgerald's performance on the album won her the 1984 Grammy Award for Best Jazz Vocal Performance, Female, one of three Grammys she won for her work with Riddle.

== Reception ==
Professional ratings
Review scores
Source	Rating
AllMusic	2/5 stars
The Penguin Guide to Jazz Recordings	2.5/4 stars
The Rolling Stone Jazz Record Guide	3/5 stars

In his biography of Riddle, September In the Rain, Peter J. Levinson wrote that the album "...simply wasn't the best. In fact it was a near disaster. The raggedy tone of Ella's voice couldn't be disguised".

== Track listing ==
1. "Don't Be That Way" (Benny Goodman, Mitchell Parish, Edgar Sampson) – 4:03
2. "God Bless the Child" (Arthur Herzog Jr., Billie Holiday) – 4:42
3. "(I Wonder) Where Our Love Has Gone" (Buddy Johnson) – 3:48
4. "You're Driving Me Crazy" (Walter Donaldson) – 3:27
5. "Any Old Time" (Artie Shaw) – 4:19
6. "Goodbye" (Gordon Jenkins) – 3:58
7. "Autumn in New York" (Vernon Duke) – 3:24
8. "The Best Is Yet to Come" (Cy Coleman, Carolyn Leigh) – 5:19
9. "Deep Purple" (Peter DeRose, Parish) – 4:04
10. "Somewhere in the Night" (Milton Raskin, Billy May) – 3:07

== Personnel ==
- Ella Fitzgerald - vocals
- Christine Ermacoff, Barbara Hunter, Dennis Karmazyn, Jerome Kessler, Robert L. Martin, Judith Perett, Frederick Seykora, Nancy Stein - cello
- Bill Green, Ronnie Lang, Ronald Langinger, Hubert Laws, Wilbur Schwartz - flute
- David Duke, Joe Meyer, Gale Robinson - french horn
- Marshal Royal - alto saxophone
- Al Aarons - trumpet
- Bob Cooper - tenor saxophone
- Bill Watrous - trombone
- Tommy Tedesco, Joe Pass - guitar
- Richard Klein - guitar, french horn
- Art Hillery - organ
- Jim Hughart - double bass
- Shelly Manne - drums
- Jimmy Rowles - piano
- Nelson Riddle - arranger, conductor
