= Dizzy's Party =

Studio album by Dizzy Gillespie
- Released: 1977
- Recorded: September 15 & 16, 1976; Los Angeles, California
- Genre: Jazz
- Length: 32:50
- Label: Pablo; 2310-784
- Producer: Norman Granz

Dizzy Gillespie chronology
Carter, Gillespie Inc. (1976)	Dizzy's Party (1977)	Free Ride (1977)

Original LP Cover

Dizzy's Party is an album by Dizzy Gillespie, recorded in 1976 and released on the Pablo label.

== Reception ==
The AllMusic review stated: "A fairly standard date from Dizzy Gillespie's mid-'70s tenure at Pablo Records, Dizzy's Party is primarily a straightforward bop session, with the trumpeter backed by a simple sax/guitar/bass/drums quartet, plus Brazilian percussionist... Dizzy's Party is fine stuff that occasionally approaches excellence".

Professional ratings
Review scores
Source	Rating
AllMusic	3/5 stars
The Penguin Guide to Jazz Recordings	2/4 stars

== Track listing ==
All compositions by Dizzy Gillespie except as indicated

1. "Dizzy's Party" (Rodney Jones) - 9:44
2. "Shim Sham Shimmy on the St. Louis Blues" (W. C. Handy) - 7:05
3. "Harlem Samba" (Laurindo Almeida, Gillespie) - 3:29
4. "Land of Milk and Honey" - 12:32

== Personnel ==
- Dizzy Gillespie – trumpet
- Ray Pizzi – tenor saxophone, soprano saxophone, flute
- Rodney Jones – guitar
- Benjamin Franklin Brown – electric bass
- Mickey Roker – drums
- Paulinho Da Costa – percussion
