= Time After Time (Oscar Peterson album) =

Studio album by Oscar Peterson
- Released: 1991
- Recorded: November 12, 14, 1986
- Genre: Jazz
- Length: 45:54
- Label: Pablo
- Producer: Norman Granz

Professional ratings
Review scores
Source	Rating
Allmusic	4/5 stars
The Penguin Guide to Jazz Recordings	3.5/4 stars

Time After Time is an album by Oscar Peterson.

== Track listing ==
1. "Cool Walk" (Oscar Peterson) – 8:21
2. "Love Ballade" (Peterson) – 9:35
3. "Soft Winds" (Benny Goodman, Fletcher Henderson) – 6:48
4. Medley: "Who Can I Turn To?"/"Without a Song"/"Time After Time" (Leslie Bricusse, Anthony Newley)/(Edward Eliscu, Billy Rose, Vincent Youmans)/(Jule Styne, Sammy Cahn) – 14:22
5. "On the Trail" (Harold Adamson, Ferde Grofé) – 6:48

== Personnel ==
- Oscar Peterson – piano
- Joe Pass – guitar
- David Young – double bass
- Martin Drew – drums
