= Montreux '77 (Roy Eldridge album) =

Live album by Roy Eldridge
- Released: 1977
- Recorded: July 13, 1977
- Genre: Jazz
- Length: 49:18
- Label: Pablo
- Producer: Norman Granz

Roy Eldridge chronology
What It's All About (1976)	Montreux '77 (1977)	Roy Eldridge & Vic Dickenson (1978)

Professional ratings
Review scores
Source	Rating
Allmusic	5/5 stars
The Rolling Stone Jazz Record Guide	4/5 stars
The Penguin Guide to Jazz Recordings	3.5/4 stars

Montreux '77 is a 1977 live album by the Roy Eldridge 4.

== Track listing ==
1. "Between the Devil and the Deep Blue Sea" (Harold Arlen, Ted Koehler) – 9:28
2. "Go For" (Roy Eldridge) – 7:03
3. "I Surrender, Dear" (Harry Barris, Gordon Clifford) – 10:41
4. "Joie de Roy" (Eldridge) – 9:04
5. "Perdido" (Ervin Drake, Hans J. Lengsfelder, Juan Tizol) – 7:12
6. "Bye Bye Blackbird" (Mort Dixon, Ray Henderson) – 7:32

== Personnel ==
=== Performance ===
- Roy Eldridge - trumpet
- Oscar Peterson – piano
- Niels-Henning Ørsted Pedersen - double bass
- Bobby Durham - drums

=== Production ===
- Phil DeLancie - digital mastering, remastering
- Phil Stern - photography
- Benny Green - liner notes
- Norman Granz - producer
