= Two for the Road (Herb Ellis and Joe Pass album) =

Studio album by Herb Ellis, Joe Pass
- Released: 1974
- Recorded: January 30 – February 20, 1974
- Studio: Los Angeles
- Genre: Jazz
- Length: 44:08 (Reissue)
- Label: Pablo
- Producer: Herb Ellis, Joe Pass

Joe Pass chronology
Seven, Come Eleven (1973)	Two for the Road (1974)	The Good Life (1974)

Two for the Road is an album by jazz guitarists Herb Ellis and Joe Pass that was released in 1974. It was the third and last album that they recorded together.

== Reception ==
Professional ratings
Review scores
Source	Rating
Allmusic	4.5/5 stars
The Rolling Stone Jazz Record Guide	3/5 stars

In his Allmusic review, critic Scott Yanow wrote "Pass was just beginning to gain recognition for his remarkable unaccompanied solos, but Ellis had not recorded in such a sparse setting before. They complement each other quite well..."

== Track listing ==
1. "Love for Sale" (Cole Porter) – 4:50
2. "Carnival (Manha de Carnaval)" (Luiz Bonfá/Antonio Maria) – 3:29
3. "Am I Blue?" (Harry Akst, Grant Clarke) – 3:08
4. "Seven Come Eleven" (Charlie Christian/Benny Goodman) – 4:33
5. "Guitar Blues" (Ellis/Pass) – 2:49
6. "Oh, Lady Be Good!" (George Gershwin/Ira Gershwin) – 3:58
7. "Cherokee" (Ray Noble) – 2:49
8. "Cherokee [version 2]" – 4:06
9. "Seulb" (Ellis/Pass) – 3:24
10. "Gee, Baby Ain't I Good to You" (Andy Razaf/Don Redman) – 2:26
11. "Try a Little Tenderness" (Jimmy Campbell/Reginald Connelly/Harry M. Woods) – 2:17
12. "I've Found a New Baby" (Jack Palmer/Spencer Williams) – 4:00
13. "Angel Eyes" (Matt Dennis/Earl Brent) – 2:52

== Personnel ==
- Herb Ellis – guitar
- Joe Pass – guitar
