= Checkmate (Joe Pass and Jimmy Rowles album) =

Studio album by Joe Pass and Jimmy Rowles
- Released: 1981
- Recorded: January 12, 1981
- Studio: Spectrum Studios, Venice, California
- Genre: Jazz
- Length: 43:42
- Label: Pablo
- Producer: Norman Granz

Joe Pass chronology
Northsea Nights (1980)	Checkmate (1981)	Ira, George and Joe (1981)

Checkmate is an album by American jazz guitarist Joe Pass and pianist Jimmy Rowles, released in 1981. It was re-issued in 1998 on CD by Original Jazz Classics.

== Reception ==
Professional ratings
Review scores
Source	Rating
AllMusic	3/5 stars
The Penguin Guide to Jazz Recordings	3/4 stars
The Rolling Stone Jazz Record Guide	3/5 stars

AllMusic's Scott Yanow wrote: "Rowles sets the quiet mood, and Pass keeps his amplifier quite low and was content to play on the pianist's turf. The emphasis is on slower tempos and harmonically sophisticated chords... Superior background music that rewards close listening."

== Track listing ==
1. "What's Your Story, Morning Glory?" (Jack Lawrence, Paul Francis Webster, Hank Williams) – 4:08
2. "So Rare" (Jerry Herst, Jack Sharpe) – 4:24
3. "As Long as I Live" (Harold Arlen, Ted Koehler) – 4:36
4. "Marquita" (Eliseo Grenet) – 3:55
5. "Stardust" (Hoagy Carmichael, Mitchell Parish) – 5:20
6. "We'll Be Together Again" (Carl Fischer, Frankie Laine) – 5:04
7. "Can't We Be Friends?" (Paul James, Kay Swift) – 4:14
8. "'Deed I Do" (Walter Hirsch, Fred Rose) – 3:55
9. "'Tis Autumn" (Henry Nemo) – 4:48
10. "God Bless the Child" (Billie Holiday, Arthur Herzog Jr.) – 3:18

== Personnel ==
- Joe Pass - guitar
- Jimmy Rowles – piano
