= The Tenor Giants Featuring Oscar Peterson =

Live album by Zoot Sims, Eddie "Lockjaw" Davis, Oscar Peterson
- Released: 2001
- Recorded: October 10–16, 1975
- Genre: Jazz
- Length: 50:15
- Label: Pablo
- Producer: Norman Granz

The Tenor Giants Featuring Oscar Peterson is a 1975 live album by the tenor saxophonists Zoot Sims and Eddie "Lockjaw" Davis, featuring the pianist Oscar Peterson.

== Reception ==
Professional ratings
Review scores
Source	Rating
AllMusic	4/5 stars

Bill Holland, writing for Billboard, said to "[w]alk up to a friend who likes...jazz", listed the personnel, then said "get ready for a major smile", and mentioned that "Davis plays Coleman Hawkins to Sims' Lester Young".

Ken Dryden's AllMusic review says that the album "was an inspired idea, because each of the two tenor saxophonists approach the instrument differently...highly recommended." He calls the rhythm section "a great one...providing plenty of fuel for the featured soloists."

== Track listing ==
1. "The Man I Love" (George Gershwin, Ira Gershwin) – 10:42
2. "My Old Flame" (Sam Coslow, Arthur Johnston) – 2:49
3. "Don't Worry 'bout Me" (Rube Bloom, Ted Koehler) – 3:11
4. "There Will Never Be Another You" (Mack Gordon, Harry Warren) – 8:17
5. "I Don't Stand a Ghost of a Chance With You" (Bing Crosby, Ned Washington, Victor Young) – 5:32
6. "Tangerine" (Johnny Mercer, Victor Schertzinger) – 9:03
7. "Out of Nowhere" (Johnny Green, Edward Heyman) – 7:32
8. "Groovin' High" (Dizzy Gillespie) – 10:24

== Personnel ==
Performance

- Zoot Sims – tenor saxophone
- Eddie "Lockjaw" Davis - tenor saxophone
- Oscar Peterson – piano
- Niels-Henning Ørsted Pedersen – double bass
- Louie Bellson – drums

Production

- Norman Granz - producer
- Jamie Putnam - art direction
- Ted Williams - photography
- Deb Sibony - design
