= Jazz Maturity... Where It's Coming From =

Studio album by Roy Eldridge and Dizzy Gillespie
- Released: 1978
- Recorded: June 3, 1975
- Genre: Jazz
- Length: 49:16
- Label: Pablo
- Producer: Norman Granz

Roy Eldridge chronology
Jazz Maturity... Where It's Coming From (1978)	Happy Time (1975)

Jazz Maturity... Where It's Coming From is a 1978 album by American Jazz trumpeters Roy Eldridge and Dizzy Gillespie, featuring rhythm section Oscar Peterson, Ray Brown, and Mickey Roker.

== Reception ==
Professional ratings
Review scores
Source	Rating
AllMusic	2/5 stars
The Penguin Guide to Jazz Recordings	3/4 stars

In a retrospective review for AllMusic, critic Scott Yanow wrote: "The material performed for this CD reissue is just not all that inspiring—a few overly played standards and blues. Despite some good efforts by Gillespie and Eldridge, pianist Oscar Peterson easily emerges as the most impressive soloist; better to acquire the magnificent collaborations of the 1950s instead."

== Track listing ==
1. "Quasi-Boogaloo" (Roy Eldridge, Dizzy Gillespie, Oscar Peterson) – 9:01
2. "Take the 'A' Train" (Billy Strayhorn) – 8:08
3. "I Cried for You (Now It's Your Turn to Cry Over Me)" (Gus Arnheim, Arthur Freed, Abe Lyman) – 7:52
4. "Drebirks" (Eldridge, Gillespie, Peterson) – 11:18
5. "When It's Sleepy Time Down South" (Clarence Muse, Leon René, Otis Rene) – 6:17
6. "(Back Home Again in) Indiana" (James F. Hanley, Ballard MacDonald) – 6:40

== Personnel ==
=== Performance ===
- Oscar Peterson – piano
- Roy Eldridge – trumpet
- Dizzy Gillespie – trumpet
- Ray Brown – bass
- Mickey Roker – drums
