= If You Could See Me Now (Oscar Peterson album) =

Studio album by Oscar Peterson
- Released: 1986
- Recorded: November 1983
- Genre: Jazz
- Length: 40:56
- Label: Pablo
- Producer: Norman Granz

If You Could See Me Now is an album by Oscar Peterson's quartet, recorded in November 1983.

== Reception ==
Professional ratings
Review scores
Source	Rating
AllMusic	4/5 stars
The Penguin Guide to Jazz	3/4 stars

The Penguin Guide to Jazz described the album as "a thin set altogether". A reviewer for The Washington Post highlighted "Limehouse Blues", describing it as "fueled by some of the most dynamic and daring excursions this quartet has ever put on record." The album won the Juno Award for Best Jazz Album in 1987.

== Track listing ==
1. "Weird Blues" (Miles Davis) – 6:42
2. "If I Should Lose You" (Ralph Rainger, Leo Robin) – 6:18
3. "On Danish Shore" (Oscar Peterson, Niels-Henning Ørsted Pedersen) – 8:28
4. "L' Impossible" (Peterson) – 6:00
5. "If You Could See Me Now" (Tadd Dameron, Carl Sigman) – 7:26
6. "Limehouse Blues" (Philip Braham, Douglas Furber) – 6:02

== Personnel ==
=== Performance ===
- Oscar Peterson – piano
- Joe Pass – guitar
- Niels-Henning Ørsted Pedersen – double bass
- Martin Drew – drums
