= Zoot Sims and the Gershwin Brothers =

Studio album by Zoot Sims
- Released: 1975
- Recorded: June 6, 1975
- Studio: RCA, New York City, NY
- Genre: Jazz
- Length: 49:11
- Label: Pablo
- Producer: Norman Granz

Zoot Sims chronology
Basie & Zoot (1975)	Zoot Sims and the Gershwin Brothers (1975)	Soprano Sax (1976)

Professional ratings
Review scores
Source	Rating
AllMusic	5/5 stars
The Penguin Guide to Jazz Recordings	4/4 stars
The Rolling Stone Jazz Record Guide	3/5 stars

Zoot Sims and the Gershwin Brothers is a 1975 studio album by American jazz saxophonist Zoot Sims, featuring the music of George and Ira Gershwin.

== Track listing ==
1. "The Man I Love" – 6:26
2. "How Long Has This Been Going On?" – 2:16
3. "Lady be Good!" – 4:37
4. "I've Got a Crush on You" – 3:01
5. "I Got Rhythm" – 7:09
6. "Embraceable You" – 4:52
7. "'S Wonderful" – 4:40
8. "Someone to Watch Over Me" – 3:46
9. "Isn't It a Pity?" – 3:27
10. "Summertime" (George Gershwin, Ira Gershwin, DuBose Heyward) – 5:25
11. "They Can't Take That Away from Me" – 4:33

All music composed by George Gershwin and all lyrics written by Ira Gershwin except where noted.

== Personnel ==
- Zoot Sims – saxophone
- Oscar Peterson – piano
- Joe Pass – guitar
- George Mraz – double bass
- Grady Tate – drums

Recorded June 6, 1975, New York City, New York

Technical personnel

- Norman Granz – Producer
- Robert "Bob" Simpson - Recording Engineer
