= Take Love Easy =

Studio album by Ella Fitzgerald and Joe Pass
- Released: 1974
- Recorded: August 28, 1973
- Studio: Metro-Goldwyn-Mayer Studio, Los Angeles
- Genre: Jazz
- Length: 37:38
- Label: Pablo
- Producer: Norman Granz

Ella Fitzgerald chronology
Newport Jazz Festival: Live at Carnegie Hall (1973)	Take Love Easy (1974)	Ella in London (1974)

Joe Pass chronology
The Trio (1973)	Take Love Easy (1974)	Seven, Come Eleven (1973)

Professional ratings
Review scores
Source	Rating
AllMusic	3/5 stars
The Encyclopedia of Popular Music	4/5 stars
The Penguin Guide to Jazz Recordings	3/4 stars

Take Love Easy is an album by the jazz singer Ella Fitzgerald with guitarist Joe Pass, released in 1974.

== History ==
The album is the first of four studio albums that Ella recorded with Pass, and it was the latest in a long line of duets for Ella with just one other instrument. She was 56 at the time.

Ella had previously recorded two albums with just piano accompianment, and prior to this, one had previously heard her with just a guitar on 'Wait Till You See Her' from the Rodgers & Hart Songbook (1956), on several of the intros to the Riddle arrangements from the George and Ira Gershwin Songbook (1959), and a few tracks on her 1957 album Ella Fitzgerald Sings the Duke Ellington Songbook ('Solitude', 'In a Sentimental Mood', and 'Azure'. The compilation The First Lady of Song includes a couple of more previously unreleased duets, "Detour Ahead" and "Angel Eyes".)

Ella and Pass didn't only record in a studio environment however, Newport Jazz Festival: Live at Carnegie Hall (1973) and Digital III at Montreux (1979) are both live recordings.

The three later albums that Ella recorded with Pass were Fitzgerald and Pass... Again (1976), Speak Love (1983), and Easy Living (1986). In addition, Pass featured prominently on Fitzgerald's 1981 album of songs by Antonio Carlos Jobim, Ella Abraça Jobim.

== Track listing ==
1. "Take Love Easy" (Duke Ellington, John La Touche) – 4:36
2. "O Amor Em Paz" ("Once I Loved") (Vinícius de Moraes, Ray Gilbert, Antônio Carlos Jobim) – 2:19
3. "Don't Be That Way" (Benny Goodman, Mitchell Parish, Edgar Sampson) – 4:39
4. "You're Blasé" (Ord Hamilton, Bruce Sievier) – 3:27
5. "Lush Life" (Billy Strayhorn) – 3:34
6. "A Foggy Day" (George Gershwin, Ira Gershwin) – 6:10
7. "Gee Baby, Ain't I Good to You?" (Andy Razaf, Don Redman) – 4:04
8. "You Go To My Head" (J. Fred Coots, Haven Gillespie) – 5:44
9. "I Want to Talk About You" (Billy Eckstine) – 3:28

== Personnel ==
- Ella Fitzgerald – vocals
- Joe Pass – guitar
