= Carter, Gillespie Inc. =

Studio album by Benny Carter and Dizzy Gillespie
- Released: 1976
- Recorded: April 27, 1976; RCA Studios, Los Angeles, California
- Genre: Jazz
- Length: 51:29
- Label: Pablo; 2310-781
- Producer: Norman Granz

Dizzy Gillespie chronology
Bahiana (1975)	Carter, Gillespie Inc. (1976)	Dizzy's Party (1976)

Benny Carter, Dizzy Gillespie Inc. Cover

Carter, Gillespie Inc. (re-released on CD as Benny Carter, Dizzy Gillespie Inc.) is an album by saxophonist Benny Carter and trumpeter Dizzy Gillespie recorded in 1976 and released on the Pablo label.

== Reception ==
The Allmusic review stated "Although they were from different musical generations (Benny Carter was born ten years before Dizzy Gillespie), it is little wonder that the swing altoist and the bop trumpeter could match up so well on this sextet session; they were quite compatible". The Penguin Guide to Jazz wrote of "much polite deference, some cheerful banter but not a great deal of classic music".

Professional ratings
Review scores
Source	Rating
Allmusic	2.5/5 stars
The Penguin Guide to Jazz	3/4 stars
The Rolling Stone Jazz Record Guide	5/5 stars

== Track listing ==
1. "Sweet and Lovely" (Gus Arnheim, Harry Tobias, Jules LeMare) - 10:41
2. "Broadway" (Billy Bird, Teddy McRae, Henri Woode) - 7:48
3. "The Courtship" (Benny Carter) - 6:29
4. "Constantinople" (Dizzy Gillespie) - 8:57
5. "Nobody Knows the Trouble I've Seen" (Traditional) - 9:08
6. "A Night in Tunisia" (Gillespie, Felix Paparelli) - 8:26

== Personnel ==
- Dizzy Gillespie - trumpet
- Benny Carter - alto saxophone
- Tommy Flanagan - piano
- Joe Pass - guitar
- Al McKibbon - bass
- Mickey Roker - drums
