= Sophisticated Lady (Ella Fitzgerald and Joe Pass album) =

Live album by Ella Fitzgerald, Joe Pass
- Released: June 19, 2001
- Recorded: 1975, 1983
- Genre: Jazz
- Length: 57:29
- Label: Pablo
- Producer: Norman Granz

Ella Fitzgerald, Joe Pass chronology
| All That Jazz (1989) | Sophisticated Lady (2001) |

Professional ratings
Review scores
| Source | Rating |
|---|---|
| Allmusic | 3/5 stars |

Sophisticated Lady is a live album by Ella Fitzgerald, accompanied by Joe Pass, released in 2001 (see 2001 in music).

== Track listing ==
For the 2001 Pablo CD Issue, PACD-5310-2

1. Ella's Introduction of Joe — 0:25
2. "I'm Beginning to See the Light" (Duke Ellington, Don George, Johnny Hodges, Harry James) – 3:12
3. Medley: "I Got It Bad (and That Ain't Good)"/"Sophisticated Lady" (Ellington, Paul Francis Webster)/(Ellingon, Irving Mills, Mitchell Parish) – 6:48
4. "One Note Samba" (Antonio Carlos Jobim, Newton Mendonça) – 7:08
5. "Georgia on My Mind" (Hoagy Carmichael, Stuart Gorrell) – 4:47
6. "Gone with the Wind" (Herbert Magidson, Allie Wrubel) – 3:14
7. "Bluesette" (Norman Gimbel, Toots Thielemans) – 3:49
8. "Old Folks" (Dedette Lee Hill, Willard Robison) – 5:04
9. "Wave" (Jobim) – 5:19
10. "Cherokee" (Ray Noble) – 5:34
11. "Take Love Easy" (Ellington, John La Touche) – 6:14
12. "Mood Indigo" (Ellington, Barney Bigard, Mills) – 2:29
13. "Satin Doll" (Ellington, Johnny Mercer) – 3:26

== Personnel ==
Recorded in Hamburg, Germany and Tokyo, Japan in 1975 and 1983.

- Ella Fitzgerald - vocals
- Joe Pass - guitar
- David Prince - liner notes
- Kirk Felton - remastering
