= A Tribute to My Friends =

Studio album by Oscar Peterson
- Released: 1984
- Recorded: November 8, 1983
- Genre: Jazz
- Length: 45:31
- Label: Pablo
- Producer: Norman Granz

Professional ratings
Review scores
Source	Rating
Allmusic	4/5 stars
The Penguin Guide to Jazz Recordings	2.5/4 stars

A Tribute to My Friends is a 1984 album by Oscar Peterson.

== Track listing ==
1. "Blueberry Hill" (Vincent Rose, Al Lewis, Larry Stock) – 4:41
2. "Sometimes I'm Happy (Sometimes I'm Blue)" (Clifford Grey, Leo Robin, Vincent Youmans) – 6:28
3. "Stuffy" (Coleman Hawkins) – 5:53
4. "Birk's Works" (Dizzy Gillespie) – 2:37
5. "Cotton Tail" (Duke Ellington) – 3:12
6. "Lover Man (Oh Where Can You Be?)" (Jimmy Davis, Roger ("Ram") Ramirez, James Sherman) – 5:22
7. "A-Tisket, A-Tasket" (Van Alexander, Ella Fitzgerald) – 4:26
8. "Rockin' Chair" (Hoagy Carmichael) – 5:32
9. "Now's the Time" (Charlie Parker) – 7:20

== Personnel ==
Performance

- Oscar Peterson – piano
- Joe Pass – guitar
- Niels-Henning Ørsted Pedersen – double bass
- Martin Drew – drums
