= Benny Carter Meets Oscar Peterson =

Studio album by Benny Carter
- Released: 1987
- Recorded: November 14, 1986
- Genre: Jazz
- Length: 44:22
- Label: Pablo
- Producer: Norman Granz

Professional ratings
Review scores
Source	Rating
Allmusic	4/5 stars
The Penguin Guide to Jazz	3/4 stars

Benny Carter Meets Oscar Peterson is an album by alto saxophonist Benny Carter, featuring the pianist Oscar Peterson.

== Track listing ==
1. "Just Friends" (John Klemmer, Sam M. Lewis) – 6:37
2. "Sweet Lorraine" (Cliff Burwell, Mitchell Parish) – 6:46
3. "Baubles, Bangles and Beads" (Robert C. Wright, George Forrest, Alexander Borodin) – 8:13
4. "It's a Wonderful World" (Harold Adamson, Jan Savitt, Johnny Watson) – 6:30
5. "If I Had You" (Jimmy Campbell, Reg Connelly, Ted Shapiro) – 6:43
6. "Whispering" (Richard H. Coburn, Vincent Rose, John Schoenberger) – 4:50
7. "Some Kind of Blues" (Benny Carter, Oscar Peterson) – 4:43

== Personnel ==
- Benny Carter – alto saxophone
- Oscar Peterson – piano
- Joe Pass – guitar
- Dave Young – double bass
- Martin Drew – drums
