= Oscar Peterson Live! =

Live album by Oscar Peterson
- Released: 1990
- Recorded: November 12, 14, 1986
- Genre: Jazz
- Length: 45:54
- Label: Pablo
- Producer: Oscar Peterson

Professional ratings
Review scores
Source	Rating
The Penguin Guide to Jazz Recordings	2.5/4 stars

Oscar Peterson Live! is a live album by Oscar Peterson.

== Track listing ==
1. The Bach Suite: "Allegro" – 9:51
2. The Bach Suite: "Andante" – 3:24
3. The Bach Suite: "Bach's Blues" – 9:11
4. "City Lights" – 7:08
5. Medley: "Perdido" (Juan Tizol, Hans J. Lengsfelder, Ervin Drake) – 6:26
6. Medley: "Caravan" (Duke Ellington, Irving Mills, Tizol) – 6:39
7. "If You Only Knew" – 7:56

All music composed by Oscar Peterson, unless otherwise noted.

== Personnel ==
- Oscar Peterson – piano
- Joe Pass – guitar
- David Young – double bass
- Martin Drew – drums
