= Live at Donte's (Joe Pass album) =

Live album by Joe Pass
- Released: 1981
- Recorded: December 8–9, 1974
- Venue: Donte's, Los Angeles
- Genre: Jazz
- Length: 91:15
- Label: Pablo
- Producer: Norman Granz

Joe Pass chronology
Virtuoso (1974)	Live at Donte's (1981)	Seven, Come Eleven (1974)

Live at Donte's (or The Joe Pass Trio Live at Donte's) is a live album by American jazz guitarist Joe Pass recorded in 1974 but first released in 1981 on Pablo Records as a double album. After spending over ten years playing in relative obscurity, Pass released the critically acclaimed solo-guitar Virtuoso and also played on two Ella Fitzgerald albums.

== Reception ==
Professional ratings
Review scores
Source	Rating
All About Jazz	(favorable)
Allmusic	4/5 stars

Writing for Allmusic, music critic Scott Yanow wrote of the album, "The performances are as excellent as one would expect. In fact, considering how many albums he did for Pablo (a few dozen), it is remarkable to realize that every one of them are quite rewarding."

== Track listing ==
1. "Look What They Done to My Song, Ma" (Melanie Safka) – 6:43
2. "You Stepped Out of a Dream" (Nacio Herb Brown, Gus Kahn) – 7:39
3. "A Time for Love" (Johnny Mandel, Paul Francis Webster) – 4:08
4. "Donte's Inferno" (Pass) – 6:31
5. "You Are the Sunshine of My Life" (Stevie Wonder) – 5:46
6. "Secret Love" (Sammy Fain, Paul Francis Webster) – 7:33
7. "Sweet Georgia Brown" (Ben Bernie, Kenneth Casey, Maceo Pinkard) – 8:28
8. "Stompin' at the Savoy" (Edgar Sampson, Benny Goodman, Chick Webb, Andy Razaf) – 10:39
9. "Darn That Dream" (Jimmy Van Heusen, Eddie DeLange) – 3:43
10. "Milestones" (John Lewis) – 8:16
11. "Lullaby of the Leaves" (Bernice Petkere, Joe Young) – 9:12
12. "What Are You Doing the Rest of Your Life?" (Alan Bergman, Marilyn Bergman, Michel Legrand) – 3:00
13. "Blues for Pamela" (Pass) – 9:37

== Personnel ==
- Joe Pass – guitar
- Jim Hughart – electric bass
- Frank Severino – drums
