= The Trumpet Kings at Montreux '75 =

Trumpet Kings at Montreux '75

Live album by Oscar Peterson
- Released: 1975
- Recorded: July 15, 1975
- Genre: Jazz
- Length: 65:12
- Label: Pablo
- Producer: Norman Granz

Professional ratings
Review scores
Source	Rating
Allmusic	3/5 stars
The Rolling Stone Jazz Record Guide	3/5 stars
The Penguin Guide to Jazz Recordings	2/4 stars

Trumpet Kings at Montreux '75 is a 1975 live album featuring the jazz trumpeters Roy Eldridge, Dizzy Gillespie and Clark Terry recorded at the 1975 Montreux Jazz Festival. The rhythm section is led by Oscar Peterson.

== Track listing ==
1. "Montreux Blues" (Louis Bellson, Roy Eldridge, Dizzy Gillespie) – 13:25
2. "There Is No Greater Love" (Isham Jones, Marty Symes) – 13:25
3. "Lullaby of the Leaves" (Bernice Petkere, Joe Young) – 11:29
4. "On the Alamo" (Jones, Gus Kahn) – 11:36
5. "Blues for Norman" (Bellson, Eldridge, Gillespie) – 8:00
6. "(Back Home Again In) Indiana" (James F. Hanley, Ballard MacDonald) – 9:03

== Personnel ==
Performance

- Roy Eldridge - trumpet
- Dizzy Gillespie
- Clark Terry
- Oscar Peterson - piano
- Niels-Henning Ørsted Pedersen - double bass
- Louie Bellson - drums

Production

- Norman Granz - producer
- Paul Beattie - engineer
- John Timperley
- Benny Green - liner notes
- Phil DeLancie - mastering
- Phil Stern - photography
- David Luke - remixing
- Eric Miller
