= Fitzgerald and Pass... Again =

Fitzgerald and Pass...Again

Studio album by Ella Fitzgerald and Joe Pass
- Released: 1976
- Recorded: January 26 – February 8, 1976
- Genre: Jazz
- Length: 54:49
- Label: Pablo
- Producer: Norman Granz

Ella Fitzgerald chronology
| Montreux '75 (1975) | Fitzgerald and Pass...Again (1976) | Montreux '77 (1977) |

Joe Pass chronology
| Virtuoso No. 2 (1976) | Fitzgerald and Pass...Again (1976) | Quadrant (1977) |

Fitzgerald and Pass...Again is a 1976 studio album by Ella Fitzgerald, accompanied by jazz guitarist Joe Pass, the second of four duet albums they recorded together after Take Love Easy (1973).

Fitzgerald's performance on this album won her the 1977 Grammy Award for Best Jazz Vocal Album. The duo would record two later albums together, Speak Love (1983), and Easy Living (1986).

== Reception ==
Professional ratings
Review scores
| Source | Rating |
|---|---|
| AllMusic | 3/5 stars |
| The Encyclopedia of Popular Music | 4/5 stars |
| The Penguin Guide to Jazz Recordings | 3/4 stars |

In his AllMusic review, critic Scott Yanow wrote that the album "finds the duo uplifting 14 superior standards with subtle improvising and gentle swing."

== Track listing ==
1. "I Ain't Got Nothin' But the Blues" (Duke Ellington, Don George) – 4:04
2. "'Tis Autumn" (Henry Nemo) – 5:05
3. "My Old Flame" (Sam Coslow, Arthur Johnston) – 4:49
4. "That Old Feeling" (Lew Brown, Sammy Fain) – 2:45
5. "Rain" (Eugene Ford) – 2:22
6. "I Didn't Know About You" (Ellington, Bob Russell) – 4:41
7. "You Took Advantage of Me" (Lorenz Hart, Richard Rodgers) – 3:35
8. "I've Got the World on a String" (Harold Arlen, Ted Koehler) – 4:07
9. "All Too Soon" (Ellington, Carl Sigman) – 4:24
10. "The One I Love (Belongs to Somebody Else)" (Isham Jones, Gus Kahn) – 4:02
11. "(In My) Solitude" (Eddie DeLange, Ellington, Irving Mills) – 3:43
12. "Nature Boy" (eden ahbez) – 2:24
13. "Tennessee Waltz" (Pee Wee King, Redd Stewart) – 3:48
14. "One Note Samba" (Jon Hendricks, Antonio Carlos Jobim, Newton Mendonça) – 5:00

== Personnel ==
Recorded January 26 – February 8, 1976, at RCA Victor's Music Center of the World Hollywood, Los Angeles:

- Ella Fitzgerald - vocals
- Joe Pass - guitar
- Norman Granz - producer
