= I Don't Stand a Ghost of a Chance with You =

Bing Crosby song composed by Victor Young, and lyrics by Crosby and Ned Washington

"I Don't Stand a Ghost of a Chance with You"
The original 1932 recording featuring Bing Crosby with Orchestral Accompaniment

1932 78 release on Brunswick Records as 6454.

1932 sheet music cover, Lawrence Music, New York.

"I Don't Stand a Ghost of a Chance with You" is a 1932 song recorded by Bing Crosby with Orchestral Accompaniment. The music was composed by Victor Young, with lyrics written by Ned Washington and Bing Crosby. The song is a jazz and pop standard that has been recorded by many different artists.

The song was recorded on October 14, 1932, by Bing Crosby in New York with Orchestral Accompaniment. Crosby was accompanied by the ARC Brunswick Studio Orchestra, led by Lennie Hayton, who also played the piano. Two master versions were recorded: B12474-A at 3:12 and B12474-B at 3:18. The recording was released as a 78 single as Brunswick 6454, backed with "Just an Echo in the Valley", and Columbia DB-2030, backed with "Cabin in the Cotton", and as a 45, Columbia 39524, backed with "Temptation". The Brunswick recording charted on January 21, 1933, reaching no. 5 on the US chart.

Crosby performed the song in the 1933 film short Please, directed by Arvid E. Gillstrom, and re-recorded the song in 1954 for his album Bing: A Musical Autobiography.

== See also ==
- List of 1930s jazz standards

== Sources ==
- Grudens, Richard (2002). Bing Crosby – Crooner of the Century. Celebrity Profiles Publishing Co.. ISBN 1-57579-248-6.
- Macfarlane, Malcolm. Bing Crosby – Day By Day. Scarecrow Press, 2001.
- Osterholm, J. Roger. Bing Crosby: A Bio-Bibliography. Greenwood Press, 1994.
