= Phil Stern =

American photographer (1919–2014)

- Born: September 3, 1919; Philadelphia, Pennsylvania, US
- Died: December 13, 2014 (aged 95); Los Angeles, California, US
- Occupation: Photographer
- Known for: War and film industry photographer
- Website: www.philsternarchives.com

Philip Stern (September 3, 1919 – December 13, 2014), also known as Snapdragon, was an American photographer noted for his iconic portraits of Hollywood stars, as well as his war photography while serving as a U.S. Army Ranger with "Darby's Rangers" during the North African and Italian campaigns in World War II.

Settling in Los Angeles after the war, Stern was staff photographer for LOOK magazine. He also worked for Life magazine and Collier's. He was present on numerous film productions as still photographer, and in that capacity took photographs of a huge cross-section of the film community. In 1972 Stern, at the instigation of Gary Merrill was in Nova Scotia for several weeks to document Merrill's friend, artist Jack L. Gray. Several cine-reels shot by Stern from that period have survived. Stern's images of Marilyn Monroe, James Dean, Marlon Brando and musician Louis Armstrong have become widely recognized icons.

In a 1998 interview with American Legends website, Stern recalled a photo session with James Dean on a studio lot that yielded a series of famous photos: "There are some people who you don't have to do anything with. And Jimmy was one of them: He was totally whimsical. There's one shot where Dean peeks out of a sweater. I didn't use a tripod or Strobe lights. I had a hand held Nikon. We broke all the rules that day."

A lifelong smoker, Stern died at the age of 95 in Los Angeles from COPD and congestive heart failure which he had been battling for over three and a half decades.
