= Pablo Records =

US record label

- Parent company: Concord Music Group
- Founded: 1973
- Founder: Norman Granz
- Status: Inactive
- Genre: Jazz
- Country of origin: U.S.

Pablo Records was a jazz record company and label founded by Norman Granz in 1973, more than a decade after he had sold his earlier catalog (including Verve Records) to MGM Records.

Pablo initially featured recordings by acts that Granz managed: Ella Fitzgerald, Oscar Peterson, and Joe Pass. Later, the label issued recordings by Count Basie, Dizzy Gillespie, Sarah Vaughan, Milt Jackson, and Paulinho da Costa. The label also re-released 1950s recordings by Art Tatum, which Granz reacquired, and released unissued European live recordings of John Coltrane and his groups.

In January 1987, it was announced that the label had been acquired by Fantasy Records for an undisclosed amount. Eric Miller, who had worked with Norman Granz since the early 1970s, continued with Pablo as head of A&R, until the early-2000s. Fantasy continued to release previously unissued recordings using the Pablo name.

== Discography ==
=== Pablo 2310-700 Series ===
The Pablo 2310-700 Series were released between 1974 and 1977.

Catalog No. (2310 Prefix)	Artist	Album	Details
701	Oscar Peterson	The Trio	with Joe Pass and Niels-Henning Ørsted Pedersen
702	Ella Fitzgerald and Joe Pass	Take Love Easy	
703	Duke Ellington	Duke's Big 4	with Joe Pass, Ray Brown and Louie Bellson
704	Various Artists	Jazz at the Santa Monica Civic '72 Vol. 1	
705	Various Artists	Jazz at the Santa Monica Civic '72 Vol. 2	
706	Various Artists	Jazz at the Santa Monica Civic '72 Vol. 3	
707	Coleman Hawkins	Sirius	
708	Joe Pass	Virtuoso	
709	Count Basie and Joe Turner	The Bosses	
711	Ella Fitzgerald	Ella in London	
712	Count Basie Trio	For the First Time	
713	Various Artists	The Exciting Battle J.A.T.P. Stockholm '55	
714	Herb Ellis and Joe Pass	Two for the Road	
716	Joe Pass	Portraits of Duke Ellington	
717	Joe Turner	The Trumpet Kings Meet Joe Turner	with Dizzy Gillespie, Roy Eldridge, Harry "Sweets" Edison and Clark Terry
718	Count Basie	Basie Jam	
719	Dizzy Gillespie	Dizzy Gillespie's Big 4	with Joe Pass, Ray Brown and Mickey Roker
720	Art Tatum, Lionel Hampton and Buddy Rich	The Tatum-Hampton-Rich Trio	reissue of 1956 Clef LP - also released as The Tatum Group Masterpieces Volume Three
721	Duke Ellington and Ray Brown	This One's for Blanton!	
722	Oscar Peterson and Count Basie	Satch and Josh	
723	Art Tatum	The Tatum Solo Masterpieces, Vol. 1	
724	Tommy Flanagan Trio	The Tommy Flanagan Tokyo Recital	
729	Art Tatum	The Tatum Solo Masterpieces, Vol. 2	
730	Art Tatum	The Tatum Solo Masterpieces, Vol. 3	
731	Art Tatum, Lionel Hampton, Harry Edison, Buddy Rich, Red Callender and Barney Kessel	The Tatum Group Masterpieces	reissue of 1956 Norgran LP - also released as The Tatum Group Masterpieces Volume Five
732	Art Tatum, Benny Carter and Louis Bellson	The Tatum Group Masterpieces, Vol. 1	
733	Art Tatum, Benny Carter and Louis Bellson	The Tatum Group Masterpieces, Vol. 2	
734	Art Tatum and Roy Eldridge	The Tatum Group Masterpieces	reissue of 1955 Clef LP
735	Art Tatum, Red Callender and Jo Jones	The Tatum Group Masterpieces	reissue of 1957 Verve LP
736	Art Tatum and Buddy DeFranco	The Tatum Group Masterpieces	
737	Art Tatum and Ben Webster	The Tatum Group Masterpieces	reissue of 1958 Verve LP - also released as The Tatum Group Masterpieces, Volume Eight
739	Oscar Peterson and Roy Eldridge	Oscar Peterson and Roy Eldridge	
740	Oscar Peterson and Dizzy Gillespie	Oscar Peterson and Dizzy Gillespie	
741	Oscar Peterson and Harry Edison	Oscar Peterson and Harry Edison	
742	Oscar Peterson and Clark Terry	Oscar Peterson and Clark Terry	
743	Oscar Peterson and Jon Faddis	Oscar Peterson and Jon Faddis	
744	Zoot Sims	Zoot Sims and the Gershwin Brothers	
745	Count Basie and Zoot Sims	Basie & Zoot	
746	Roy Eldridge	Happy Time	
747	Peterson 6	The Oscar Peterson Big 6 at Montreux	
748	JATP	Jazz at the Philharmonic at the Montreux Jazz Festival 1975	
749	Dizzy Gillespie	The Dizzy Gillespie Big 7	
750	Count Basie	Count Basie Jam Session at the Montreux Jazz Festival 1975	
751	Ella Fitzgerald	Ella Fitzgerald at the Montreux Jazz Festival 1975	
752	Joe Pass	Joe Pass at the Montreux Jazz Festival 1975	
753	Milt Jackson	The Milt Jackson Big 4	
754	The Trumpet Kings	The Trumpet Kings at Montreux '75	Roy Eldridge, Dizzy Gillespie and Clark Terry
755	Louis Bellson	The Louis Bellson Explosion	
756	Count Basie	Basie Big Band	
757	Milt Jackson, Joe Pass and Ray Brown	The Big 3	
759	Ella Fitzgerald and Oscar Peterson	Ella and Oscar	
760	Joe Turner with Milt Jackson and Roy Eldridge	Nobody in Mind	
762	Duke Ellington	The Ellington Suites	
763	Joe Turner	Another Epoch-Stride Piano	
764	Ray Bryant	Here's Ray Bryant	
765	Jon Faddis	Youngblood	
766	Roy Eldridge	What It's All About	
767	Count Basie and His Orchestra	I Told You So	
768	Benny Carter	The King	
769	Mike Longo	Talk with the Spirits	
770	Zoot Sims	Soprano Sax	
771	Dizzy Gillespie y Machito	Afro-Cuban Jazz Moods	
772	Ella Fitzgerald and Joe Pass	Fitzgerald and Pass... Again	
774	Milt Jackson and Strings	Feelings	
775	Art Tatum, Lionel Hampton and Buddy Rich	Tatum-Hampton-Rich ...Again!	also released as The Tatum Group Masterpieces Volume Four
776	Joe Turner	In the Evening	
777	Dom Um Romão	Hotmosphere	
778	Eddie "Lockjaw" Davis with The Tommy Flanagan Trio	Straight Ahead	
779	Oscar Peterson and Joe Pass	Porgy and Bess	
780	Harry Edison	Edison's Lights	
781	Benny Carter and Dizzy Gillespie	Carter, Gillespie Inc.	
782	Al Gafa Quinteto	Leblon Beach	
783	Zoot Sims	Hawthorne Nights	
784	Dizzy Gillespie 6	Dizzy's Party	
785	Paulinho da Costa	Agora	
786	Count Basie	Basie Jam #2	
787	Duke Ellington	The Intimate Ellington	
788	Joe Pass	Virtuoso #2	
789	Art Tatum	The Tatum Solo Masterpieces, Vol. 4	
790	Art Tatum	The Tatum Solo Masterpieces, Vol. 5	
791	Art Tatum	The Tatum Solo Masterpieces, Vol. 6	
792	Art Tatum	The Tatum Solo Masterpieces, Vol. 7	
793	Art Tatum	The Tatum Solo Masterpieces, Vol. 8	
794	Dizzy Gillespie, composed and arranged By Lalo Schifrin	Free Ride	
795	Ray Pizzi	Conception	
796	Oscar Peterson, Joe Pass and Ray Brown	The Giants	
797	Count Basie and His Orchestra	Prime Time	
798	Ray Bryant	Solo Flight	
799	Jo Jones	The Main Man	

=== Pablo 2310-800 Series ===
The Pablo 2310-800 Series were released between 1978 and 1983.

Catalog No. (2310 Prefix)	Artist	Album	Details
800	Joe Turner	Things That I Used to Do	
801	Phineas Newborn Trio	Look Out – Phineas Is Back!	
802	Oscar Peterson and Count Basie	Satch and Josh...Again	
803	Zoot Sims meets Jimmy Rowles	If I'm Lucky	
804	Milt Jackson and the Monty Alexander Trio	Soul Fusion	
805	Joe Pass	Virtuoso #3	
806	Harry Edison and Eddie "Lockjaw" Davis	Simply Sweets	
807	Louie Bellson and Walfredo de los Reyes	Ecué - Ritmos Cubanos	
808	Art Tatum	The Tatum Solo Masterpieces, Vol. 9	
809	Art Tatum	The Tatum Solo Masterpieces, Vol. 10	
810	Art Tatum	The Tatum Solo Masterpieces, Vol. 11	
811	Art Tatum	The Tatum Solo Masterpieces, Vol. 12	
812	Art Tatum	The Tatum Solo Masterpieces, Vol. 13	
813	Louie Bellson & The "Explosion" Orchestra	Sunshine Rock	
814	Ella Fitzgerald & Cole Porter	Dream Dancing	reissue of Atlantic LP Ella Loves Cole with 2 new recordings
815	Duke Ellington & His Orchestra	Up in Duke's Workshop	
816	Roy Eldridge and Dizzy Gillespie	Jazz Maturity...Where It's Coming From	with Oscar Peterson, Ray Brown and Mickey Roker
817	Oscar Peterson and the Trumpet Kings	Jousts	duets with Harry "Sweets" Edison, Jon Faddis, Clark Terry, Roy Eldridge and Dizzy Gillespie
818	Joe Turner	Everyday I Have the Blues	with Pee Wee Crayton and Sonny Stitt
819	Mary Lou Williams	My Mama Pinned a Rose On Me	
820	Ray Bryant Trio	All Blues	
821	Sarah Vaughan	How Long Has This Been Going On?	
822	Milt Jackson and Count Basie	Milt Jackson + Count Basie + The Big Band Vol. 1	
823	Milt Jackson and Count Basie	Milt Jackson + Count Basie + The Big Band Vol. 2	
824	Joe Pass and Paulinho da Costa	Tudo Bem!	
825	Ella Fitzgerald	Lady Time	
826	Monty Alexander 7	Jamento	
829	Ella Fitzgerald	Fine and Mellow	
830	Joe Pass and Niels-Henning Ørsted Pedersen	Chops	
831	Zoot Sims and Jimmy Rowles	Warm Tenor	
832	Milt Jackson	Soul Believer	
833	Count Basie and Dizzy Gillespie	The Gifted Ones	with Ray Brown and Mickey Roker
834	Louie Bellson Drum Explosion	Matterhorn	
835	Art Tatum	The Tatum Solo Masterpieces, Vol. 9	
836	Monty Alexander	Monty Alexander in Tokyo	
837	Joe Pass and Milt Jackson	Quadrant	with Ray Brown and Mickey Roker
838	Louie Bellson	Louie Bellson Jam	
840	Count Basie	Basie Jam #3	
841	John Haley Sims and Harry Sweets Edison	Just Friends	
842	Milt Jackson and His Colleagues	Bags' Bag	with Ray Brown and Cedar Walton
843	Count Basie & Oscar Peterson	Night Rider	
844	Joe Turner	The Midnight Special	
845	Duke Ellington	The Best of Duke Ellington	compilation
846	Ray Bryant	The Best of Ray Bryant	compilation
847	Harry Edison	The Best of Harry Edison	compilation
848	Joe Turner	The Best of Joe Turner	compilation
849	Milt Jackson	The Best of Milt Jackson	compilation
850	Zoot Sims	The Best of Zoot Sims	compilation
851	Louie Bellson	The Best of Louie Bellson	compilation
852	Count Basie	The Best of Count Basie	compilation
853	Benny Carter	The Best of Benny Carter	compilation
854	Tommy Flanagan	The Best of Tommy Flanagan	compilation
855	Dizzy Gillespie	The Best of Dizzy Gillespie	compilation
856	Mary Lou Williams	The Best of Mary Lou Williams	compilation
857	Roy Eldridge	The Best of Roy Eldridge	compilation
858	Eddie "Lockjaw" Davis	The Best of Eddie "Lockjaw" Davis	compilation
859	Count Basie	Kansas City Shout	with Joe Turner and Eddie "Cleanhead" Vinson
860	Ray Bryant Trio	Potpourri	
861	Zoot Sims	The Swinger	
862	Art Tatum	The Tatum Solo Masterpieces, Vol. 10	
863	Joe Turner	Have No Fear Joe Turner Is Here	
864	Art Tatum	The Tatum Solo Masterpieces, Vol. 11	
865	Joe Pass and Jimmy Rowles	Checkmate	
866	Eddie "Cleanhead" Vinson	I Want a Little Girl	
867	Milt Jackson	Big Mouth	
868	Zoot Sims	I Wish I Were Twins	
869	Roy Eldridge	Little Jazz and the Jimmy Ryan All-Stars	
870	Art Tatum	The Tatum Solo Masterpieces, Vol. 12	
871	Count Basie 6	Kansas City	
872	Zoot Sims Four	The Innocent Years	
873	Milt Jackson	Ain't But a Few of Us Left	
874	Count Basie Big Band	Farmer's Market Barbecue	
875	Art Tatum	The Tatum Solo Masterpieces, Vol. 13	
876	Oscar Peterson and Freddie Hubbard	Face to Face	
877	Joe Pass Trio	Eximious	
878	Count Basie Kansas City 3	For the Second Time	with Louis Bellson and Ray Brown
879	Zoot Sims Plus Joe Pass	Blues for 2	
880	Louie Bellson Big Band	The London Gig	
881	Oscar Peterson and Milt Jackson	Two of the Few	
882	Eddie "Lockjaw" Davis, Harry Edison and Al Grey	Jazz at the Philharmonic, 1983	
883	Joe Turner	Life Ain't Easy	
884	Freddie Hubbard	The Best of Freddie Hubbard: Live and In Studio	compilation
885	Sarah Vaughan	The Best of Sarah Vaughan	compilation
886	John Coltrane	The Best of John Coltrane	compilation
887	Art Tatum	The Best of Art Tatum	compilation
888	Ella Fitzgerald and Joe Pass	Speak Love	
889	Dizzy Gillespie and Arturo Sandoval	To a Finland Station	
890	Various Artists	Jazz Dance	compilation
891	Count Basie and His Orchestra	Me and You	
892	Sacha Distel	My Guitar and All That Jazz	
893	Joe Pass	The Best of Joe Pass	compilation
894	Niels-Henning Ørsted Pedersen and Philip Catherine	The Viking	
895	Oscar Peterson	History of an Artist Vol. 2	compilation
896	Count Basie Meets Oscar Peterson	The Timekeepers	
897	Milt Jackson, J. J. Johnson and Ray Brown	Jackson, Johnson, Brown, & Company	
898	Zoot Sims	Suddenly It's Spring	
899	Louie Bellson	Cool, Cool, Blue	

=== Pablo 2310-900 Series ===
The Pablo 2310-900 Series ran from 1984 until 2004 and in 1991 began issuing compact discs exclusively.

Catalog No. (2310 Prefix)	Artist	Album	Details
900	Milt Jackson Quartet	Soul Route	
901	Count Basie & His Orchestra	88 Basie Street	
902	Oscar Peterson Quartet	A Tribute to My Friends	
903	Zoot Sims	Quietly There: Zoot Sims Plays Johnny Mandel	
904	Joe Turner	Kansas City Here I Come	
905	Frank Foster + Frank Wess	Two for the Blues	
906	Buddy DeFranco	Mr. Lucky	
907	Stephane Grappelli and Stuff Smith	Violins No End	
908	Count Basie	Kansas City 7	
909	Milt Jackson Ray Brown Quartet	It Don't Mean a Thing If You Can't Tap Your Foot to It	with Cedar Walton and Mickey Roker
910	Niels-Henning Ørsted Pedersen	The Eternal Traveller	
911	Joe Pass and J. J. Johnson	We'll Be Together Again	
912	Joe Pass	Whitestone	
913	Joe Turner Meets Jimmy Witherspoon	Patcha, Patcha, All Night Long	
914	Zoot Sims	In a Sentimental Mood	
915	Buddy DeFranco Meets the Oscar Peterson Quartet	Hark	
916	Milt Jackson and His Gold Medal Winners	Brother Jim	
917	The Modern Jazz Quartet	Topsy: This One's for Basie	
918	The Oscar Peterson Four	If You Could See Me Now	
919	The Count Basie Kansas City Septem	Mostly Blues...and Some Others	
920	Count Basie and His Orchestra	Fancy Pants	
921	Ella Fitzgerald and Joe Pass	Easy Living	
922	The Benny Carter Group	Wonderland	
923	Count Basie and Oscar Peterson	Yessir, That's My Baby	
924	Freddie Green, Budd Johnson, Eddie "Lockjaw" Davis, Harry Edison, Clark Terry, Gus Johnson and John Clayton	Count Basie Get Together	
925	Count Basie	Basie and Friends	compilation
926	Benny Carter and Oscar Peterson	Benny Carter Meets Oscar Peterson	
927	Oscar Peterson, Harry Edison and Eddie "Cleanhead" Vinson	Oscar Peterson + Harry Edison + Eddie "Cleanhead" Vinson	
928	Count Basie & Roy Eldridge	Loose Walk	
929	Sonny Criss	Intermission Riff	recorded 1951
930	The Curtis Peagler 4	I'll Be Around	
931	Joe Pass	Blues for Fred	
932	Milt Jackson	A London Bridge	
933	Coleman Hawkins & Friends	Bean Stalkin'	recorded in 1960
934	Harry Sweets Edison	For My Pals	
935	Benny Carter	My Kind of Trouble	
936	Joe Pass	One for My Baby	
937	Joe Turner with Count Basie and His Orchestra	Flip, Flop & Fly	recorded 1972
938	Ella Fitzgerald	All That Jazz	
939	Joe Pass	Summer Nights	
940	Oscar Peterson	Oscar Peterson Live!	
941	Louis Armstrong	Mack the Knife	recorded 1957
942	Zoot Sims	For Lady Day	recorded 1978
943	Joe Turner	Stormy Monday	recorded 1974–78
944-2	Milt Jackson	Mostly Duke	recorded 1982
945-2	Count Basie Big Band	Fun Time	recorded 1975
946-2	Joe Pass	Appassionato	
947-2	Oscar Peterson	Time After Time	recorded 1976
948-2	Joe Pass	Virtuoso Live!	
949-2	Ron Affif	Ron Affif	
950-2	Anita O'Day	Rules of the Road	
951-2	Joe Pass & Co.	Joe Pass Quartet Live at Yoshi's	
953-2	Zoot Sims	On the Korner	
954-2	Ron Affif	Vierd Blues	
955-2	Joe Pass	Songs for Ellen	
956-2	John Pisano	Among Friends	
957-2	Art Pepper and Zoot Sims	Art 'n' Zoot	recorded 1981
958-2	Ron Affif Trio	52nd Street	
959-2	Joe Passand John Pisano	Duets	
960-2	Ella Fitzgerald	Bluella: Ella Fitzgerald Sings the Blues	compilation
961-2	Joe Pass	Nuages (Live at Yoshi's, vol. 2)	
962-2	Ron Affif Trio	Ringside	
963-2	John Pisano	Conversation Pieces	
964-2	Joe Pass	Unforgettable	
965-2	Ron Affif	Solotude	
966-2	The Oscar Peterson	Oscar Peterson Plays Duke Ellington	compilation recorded between 1967 and 1986
967-2	Milt Jackson Memorial Album	To Bags...With Love	compilation recorded between 1954 and 1983
968-2	Joe Pass	Resonance	
969-2	Zoot Sims and Eddie "Lockjaw" Davis	The Tenor Giants Featuring Oscar Peterson	with Oscar Peterson recorded 1975
970-2	Oscar Peterson	The Composer	compilation recorded 1974–86
971-2	Joe Pass	What Is There to Say	
972-2	Bud Powell	Paris Sessions	compilation recorded 1957–64
973-2	Various Artists	Blues Around the Clock	compilation
974-2	Joe Pass	Meditation: Solo Guitar	
975-2	Oscar Peterson	Solo	recorded 1972
976-2	Bud Powell	Parisian Thoroughfares	compilation recorded 1957–61
977-2	Zoot Sims with the Joe Castro Trio	Live at Falcon Lair	recorded 1956
978-2	Bud Powell	Bebop	compilation recorded 1948–54
979-2	Joe Pass	Virtuoso in New York	

=== Pablo Live 2308-200 Series ===
The Pablo Live 200 Series commenced with a number of albums recorded at the 1977 Montreux Jazz Festival and continued releasing historical and commissioned live recordings until 1986.

Catalog No. (2308 Prefix)	Artist	Album	Details
201	Ray Bryant	Ray Bryant: Montreux '77	recorded in Switzerland in 1977
202	Tommy Flanagan 3	Tommy Flanagan 3: Montreux '77	recorded in Switzerland in 1977
203	Roy Eldridge 4	Roy Eldridge 4 – Montreux '77	recorded in Switzerland in 1977
204	Benny Carter	Benny Carter 4: Montreux '77	recorded in Switzerland in 1977
205	Milt Jackson and Ray Brown	Milt Jackson Ray Brown Jam: Montreux '77	recorded in Switzerland in 1977
206	Ella Fitzgerald with the Tommy Flanagan Trio	Ella Fitzgerald with the Tommy Flanagan Trio: Montreux '77	recorded in Switzerland in 1977
207	Count Basie Big Band	Count Basie Big Band: Montreux '77	recorded in Switzerland in 1977
208	Oscar Peterson	Oscar Peterson Jam – Montreux '77	recorded in Switzerland in 1977
209	Count Basie	Basie Jam: Montreux '77	recorded in Switzerland in 1977
210	The Pablo All Stars	Pablo All Star Jam: Montreux '77	recorded in Switzerland in 1977
211	Dizzy Gillespie	Dizzy Gillespie Jam: Montreux '77	recorded in Switzerland in 1977
212	Joe Pass	Joe Pass: Montreux '77	recorded in Switzerland in 1977
213	Oscar Peterson	Oscar Peterson and the Bassists – Montreux '77	with Ray Brown/Niels Pedersen recorded in Switzerland in 1977
214	Eddie "Lockjaw" Davis	Eddie "Lockjaw" Davis 4 – Montreux '77	recorded in Switzerland in 1977
216	Benny Carter	'Live and Well in Japan!	recorded in Japan in 1977
217	John Coltrane	The Paris Concert	recorded in France in 1962 or 1963
218	Mary Lou Williams	Solo Recital: Montreux '78	recorded in Switzerland in 1978
219	Lester Young	Pres	aka Lester Young in Washington, D.C. 1956 Vol. 1
220	Stephane Grappelli + Joe Pass + Niels-Henning Ørsted Pedersen	Tivoli Gardens, Copenhagen, Denmark	recorded in Denmark in 1979
8221	Joe Pass and Niels-Henning Ørsted Pedersen	Northsea Nights	recorded in the Netherlands in 1979
222	John Coltrane	The European Tour	recorded in Sweden in 1963
223	Ella Fitzgerald, Count Basie, Joe Pass and Niels-Henning Ørsted Pedersen	Digital III at Montreux	recorded in Switzerland in 1979
224	Oscar Peterson	Digital at Montreux	recorded in Switzerland in 1979
225	Lester Young	Pres Vol. II	aka Lester Young in Washington, D.C. 1956 Volume 2
226	Dizzy Gillespie	Digital at Montreux, 1980	recorded in Switzerland in 1980
227	John Coltrane	Bye Bye Blackbird	recorded in Sweden in 1962
228	Lester Young	Pres Vol. III	aka Lester Young in Washington, D.C. 1956 Vol. III
229	Mongo Santamaria with Dizzy Gillespie and Toots Thielemans	Summertime: Digital at Montreux 1980	recorded in Switzerland in 1980
230	Lester Young	Pres Vol. IV	aka Lester Young in Washington, D.C. 1956 Vol. IV
231	Oscar Peterson Trio	Nigerian Marketplace	recorded in Switzerland in 1981
232	Oscar Peterson and Stephane Grappelli	Skol	recorded in Denmark in 1979
233	Toots Thielmans, Joe Pass and Niels-Henning Ørsted Pedersen	Live in the Netherlands	recorded in the Netherlands in 1980
234	Ella Fitzgerald	Ella à Nice	recorded in France in 1971
235	Milt Jackson	Memories of Thelonious Sphere Monk	recorded in England in 1982
237	Harry Edison All Stars	'S Wonderful: Live at Club House 33	recorded in Japan in 1982
238	Cannonball Adderley - Nat Adderley Quintet	What Is This Thing Called Soul?	recorded in France and Sweden in 1960
239	Joe Pass	Live at Long Beach City College	recorded in California in 1984
240	Various Artists	Jazz at The Philharmonic, Hartford, 1953	featuring Oscar Peterson, Lester Young, Roy Eldridge and Ben Webster recorded in Connecticut in 1953
241	Oscar Peterson	The Good Life	recorded in Chicago in 1973
242	Ella Fitzgerald and Duke Ellington	The Stockholm Concert, 1966	recorded in Sweden in 1966
243	The Modern Jazz Quartet	Reunion at Budokan 1981	recorded in Japan in 1981
244	The Modern Jazz Quartet	Together Again: Live at the Montreux Jazz Festival '82	recorded in Switzerland in 1982
245	Duke Ellington and His Orchestra	Harlem	recorded in Sweden in 1974
246	Count Basie	Live in Japan '78	recorded in Japan in 1978
247	Duke Ellington	In the Uncommon Market	recorded in Sweden, Italy and France in 1963
249	Joe Pass	University of Akron Concert	recorded in Ohio in 1985

=== Pablo Today 2312-100 Series ===
The Pablo Today 2312-100 released albums from 1979 until 1984, when it remained dormant until a double CD of material by Sarah Vaughan was released in 1999.

Catalog No. (2312 Prefix)	Artist	Album	Details
101	Sarah Vaughan	I Love Brazil!	
102	Paulinho da Costa	Happy People	
103	Oscar Peterson	The Silent Partner (soundtrack)	
104	Jorge Ben	Creole Girl	reissue of 1973 Philips LP 10 Anos Depois
105	Clark Terry	Ain't Misbehavin'	
106	Rune Gustafsson and Zoot Sims	The Sweetest Sounds	
108	Oscar Peterson Quartet	Night Child	
109	Joe Pass	I Remember Charlie Parker	
110	Ella Fitzgerald and Count Basie	A Perfect Match	recorded in Switzerland in 1979
111	Sarah Vaughan	Duke Ellington Song Book One	
112	Count Basie	On the Road	
113	Oscar Peterson	The Personal Touch	
114	Dizzy Gillespie, Clark Terry, Freddie Hubbard and Oscar Peterson	The Trumpet Summit Meets the Oscar Peterson Big 4	
115	Clark Terry and Zoot Sims	Mother ! Mother !	
116	Sarah Vaughan	Duke Ellington Song Book Two	
117	Milt Jackson, Ray Brown, Mickey Roker and Joe Pass	All Too Soon: Quadrant Toasts Duke Ellington	
118	The Clark Terry Five	Memories of Duke	
119	Various Artists	A Celebration of Duke	featuring Sarah Vaughan, Clark Terry, Zoot Sims and Quadrant
120	Zoot Sims	Passion Flower: Zoot Sims Plays Duke Ellington	
121	Matrix	Harvest	
122	Lorne Lofsky	It Could Happen to You	
123	J.J. Johnson	Concepts in Blue	
124	Milt Jackson	Night Mist	
125	Sarah Vaughan	Copacabana	
126	Count Basie	Kansas City 5	
127	Clark Terry	Yes, The Blues	
129	Oscar Peterson	A Royal Wedding Suite	
130	Sarah Vaughan with the Count Basie Orchestra	Send In the Clowns	
131	Count Basie and His Orchestra	Warm Breeze	
132	Ella Fitzgerald with Count Basie and the Count Basie Orchestra	A Classy Pair	
133	Joe Pass	Ira, George and Joe	
134	Freddie Hubbard	Born to Be Blue	
135	Oscar Peterson	The Personal Touch	reissue of 113
136	Clark Terry, Freddie Hubbard, Dizzy Gillespie and Oscar Peterson	The Alternate Blues	
137	Sarah Vaughan	Crazy and Mixed Up	
138	Ella Fitzgerald	The Best Is Yet to Come	
139	Michel Legrand	After the Rain	
140	Ella Fitzgerald and André Previn	Nice Work If You Can Get It	
141	J. J. Johnson and Al Grey	Things Are Getting Better All the Time	
142	The Modern Jazz Quartet	Echoes	
143	Paulinho da Costa	Sunrise	
144-2	Sarah Vaughan	Linger Awhile: Live at Newport and More	

=== Pablo Live 2620-100 Series ===
The Pablo Live 100 Series commenced in 1977 and featured double (or multiple) LP live albums of historical and commissioned recordings up until 1986. In 2002, two CDs of historical recordings were released on the series.

Catalog No. (2620 Prefix)	Artist	Album	Details
101	John Coltrane	Afro Blue Impressions	recorded in Stockholm and Berlin in 1963
102	Johnny Hodges	Johnny Hodges at the Sportpalast, Berlin	recorded in Berlin in 1961
103	Milt Jackson	Milt Jackson at the Kosei Nenkin	recorded in Tokyo in 1976
104	Various Artists	J.A.T.P. in Tokyo: Live at the Nichigeki Theatre 1953	3-LP set featuring Oscar Peterson, Ella Fitzgerald, Gene Krupa and others recorded in Japan in 1953
105	Various Artists	The Jam Sessions: Montreux '77	featuring Oscar Peterson, Milt Jackson, Ray Brown, Dizzy Gillespie, Count Basie and the Pablo All Stars recorded in Switzerland in 1977
106	Various Artists	The Art of the Jam Session: Montreux '77	8LP Box Set featuring Oscar Peterson, Milt Jackson, Ray Brown, Dizzy Gillespie, Count Basie and the Pablo All Stars recorded in Switzerland in 1977
107	Various Artists	The Montreux '77 Collection: Montreux '77	8LP Box Set featuring Ray Bryant, Tommy Flanagan, Roy Eldridge, Benny Carter, Eddie "Lockjaw" Davis, Ella Fitzgerald, Count Basie and Joe Pass recorded in Switzerland in 1977
108	Mary Lou Williams and Cecil Taylor	Embraced	recorded in New York City in 1977
109	J. J. Johnson and Nat Adderley	The Yokohama Concert	recorded in Japan in 1977
111	Oscar Peterson, Louis Bellson and John Heard	The London Concert: Royal Festival Hall, 1978	recorded in England in 1978
112	Oscar Peterson, Joe Pass and Niels Pedersen	The Paris Concert: Salle Pleyel, 1978	recorded in France in 1978
113	Freddie Hubbard	Live at the Northsea Jazz Festival: The Hague, Holland, 1980	recorded in Holland in 1980
114	Joe Pass Trio	Live at Donte's	recorded in California in 1974
115	Oscar Peterson	Live at the Northsea Jazz Festival: The Hague, Holland, 1980	recorded in Holland in 1980
116	Dizzy Gillespie	Musician, Composer, Raconteur	recorded in Switzerland in 1981
117	Various Artists	Return to Happiness: Jazz at the Philharmonic, Yoyogi National Stadium, Tokyo, 1983	featuring the JATP All Stars, Oscar Peterson and Ella Fitzgerald recorded in Japan in 1983
118	Oscar Peterson Trio	The Oscar Peterson Trio at Zardi's	3-LP set recorded in California in 1955
119	Various Artists	J.A.T.P. in London, 1969	featuring Benny Carter, Dizzy Gillespie, Clark Terry, Coleman Hawkins and others recorded in England in 1969
120-2	Milt Jackson	Centerpiece: At the Kosei Nenkin Vol. 2	CD recorded in Japan in 1976
121-2	J. J. Johnson and Nat Adderley	Chain Reaction: Yokohama Concert, Vol. 2	CD recorded in Japan in 1977

=== Pablo 2625-700 series ===
The Pablo 2625–700 series were released in 1974–84 and featured a mix of double LP and multiple LP box sets of live albums, compilations, and other recordings.

Catalog No. (2625 Prefix)	Artist	Album	Details
701	Various Artists	Jazz at the Santa Monica Civic '72	3LP Box set featuring Count Basie, Ella Fitzgerald and the Jazz at the Philharmonic All Stars
702	Oscar Peterson	The History of an Artist	2LP compilation
703	Art Tatum	The Tatum Solo Masterpieces	13LP Box Set
704	Various Artists	The Greatest Jazz Concert in the World	4LP Box Set featuring Oscar Peterson, Coleman Hawkins, Ella Fitzgerald, T-Bone Walker, Duke Ellington and others
705	Oscar Peterson and Joe Pass	Oscar Peterson et Joe Pass à Salle Pleyel	2LP live album recorded in Paris in 1975
706	Art Tatum	The Tatum Group Masterpieces	8LP Box Set
707	Various Artists	The Montreux Collection	2LP live album recorded in Switzerland in 1975
708	Dizzy Gillespie	Bahiana	2LP studio album
711	Oscar Peterson	Oscar Peterson in Russia	2LP live album recorded in Russia in 1974
712	Machito and His Afro-Cuban Salseros	Mucho Macho	2LP compilation
713	Various Artists	The Pablo Collection	2LP compilation
713	Ella Fitzgerald	L'Art d'Ella Fitzgerald	3LP compilation released in France
714	Oscar Peterson	L'Art d'Oscar Peterson	3LP compilation released in France
715	Count Basie	L'Art de Count Basie	3LP compilation released in France
716	Dizzy Gillespie	L'Art de Dizzy Gillespie	3LP compilation released in France
717	Art Tatum	Art Tatum	3LP compilation released in France
718	Count Basie	Count Basie: The Pablo Years	2LP compilation

=== Pablo Today 2630-200 Series ===
The Pablo Today 2630-200 Series consisted of one double LP album released in 1981.

Catalog No. (2630 Prefix)	Artist	Album	Details
201	Ella Fitzgerald	Ella Abraça Jobim	

=== Pablo Live 2640-100 Series ===
The Pablo Live 2640-100 Series consisted of two double LP sets (one live and one studio recording) which were released in 1983.

Catalog No. (2640 Prefix)	Artist	Album	Details
101	Oscar Peterson Big 4	Freedom Song	recorded in Japan in 1982
102	Joe Pass	Virtuoso #4	recorded at MGM Recording Studio in Los Angeles in 1973

=== Pablo 5300 Series ===
The Pablo 5300 Series consisted of compact discs of unreleased concert performances usually from Norman Granz' Jazz at the Philharmonic tours of Europe released between 1996 and 2002.

Catalog No.	Artist	Album	Details
5301-2	Ray Charles	Berlin, 1962	recorded in West Germany in 1962
5302-2	Muddy Waters	Paris, 1972	recorded in France in 1972
5303-2	Cannonball Adderley Quintet	Paris, 1960	recorded in France in 1960
5304-2	Duke Ellington	Berlin '65/Paris '67	recorded in West Germany in 1965 and France in 1967
5305-2	Jazz at the Philharmonic	Frankfurt, 1952	featuring Lester Young, Flip Phillips, Roy Eldridge, Hank Jones, Ray Brown and Max Roach recorded in West Germany in 1952
5306-2	Various Artists	The Montreux Collection	reissue of 1975 double LP recorded in Switzerland in 1975
5308-2	Ella Fitzgerald	Ella in Budapest	recorded in Hungary in 1970
5309-2	Gerry Mulligan	The Gerry Mulligan Quartets in Concert	recorded in California in 1957 and France in 1962
5310-2	Ella Fitzgerald and Joe Pass	Sophisticated Lady	recorded in West Germany in 1975 and Japan in 1983
5311-2	Jazz at the Philharmonic	Norman Granz' J.A.T.P. at Carnegie Hall, 1949	recorded in New York City in 1949
5312-2	Stan Kenton Orchestra	Stompin' at Newport	recorded in Rhode Island in 1957
5313-2	Duke Ellington	Duke Ellington at the Alhambra	recorded in France in 1958
5314-2	Roy Eldridge	Decidedly	recorded in France in 1975
5315-2	George Shearing/Cannonball Adderley	the George Shearing/Cannonball Adderley Quintets at Newport	recorded in Rhode Island in 1957
5316-2	Horace Silver	Paris Blues	recorded in France in 1962
5317-2	Mongo Santamaria	Montreux Heat!	recorded in Switzerland in 1980
5318-2	Shelly Manne & His Men	Yesterdays	recorded in Switzerland and Denmark in 1960
5319-2	Count Basie	Good Time Blues	recorded in Hungary in 1970

== See also ==
- List of record labels
