= Joe Pass =

American jazz guitarist (1929–1994)

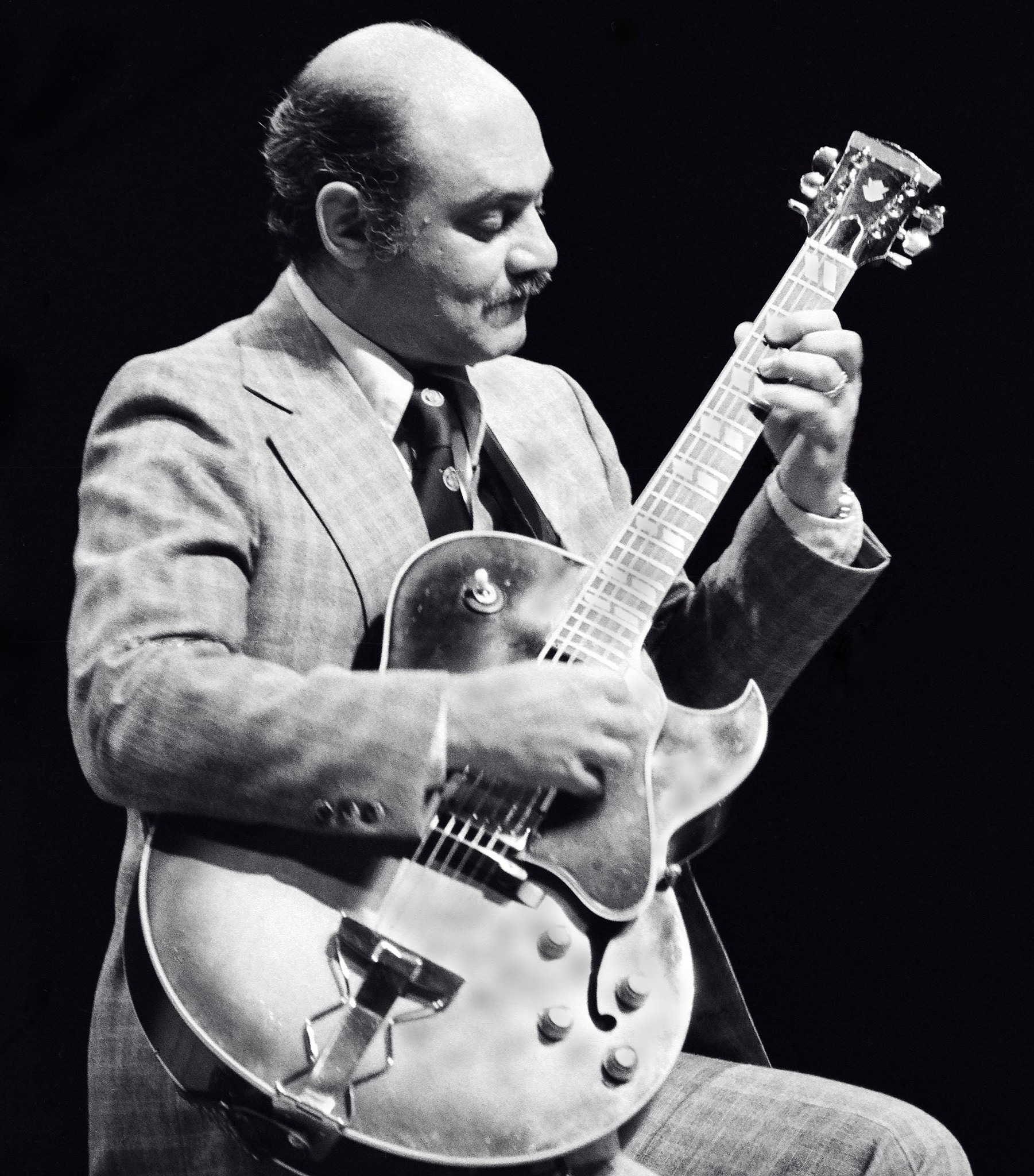
- Pass in 1975

Background information
- Born: Joseph Anthony Jacobi Passalaqua; January 13, 1929; New Brunswick, New Jersey, U.S.
- Origin: Johnstown, Pennsylvania, U.S.
- Died: May 23, 1994 (aged 65) Los Angeles, California, U.S.
- Genre: Jazz
- Occupations: Guitarist, composer
- Instrument: Guitar
- Years active: 1943–1994
- Labels: Pacific Jazz, Concord, Pablo

Joe Pass (born Joseph Anthony Jacobi Passalaqua; January 13, 1929 – May 23, 1994) was an American jazz guitarist. Pass recorded and performed live with pianist Oscar Peterson, composer Duke Ellington, and vocalist Ella Fitzgerald, and he is generally esteemed as one of the most notable jazz guitarists of the 20th century for his solo guitar playing, found on recordings such as Virtuoso.

== Early life ==
Pass was born in New Brunswick, New Jersey, on January 13, 1929. His father, Mariano Passalacqua, was a steel-mill worker who was born in Sicily. The family later moved to Johnstown, Pennsylvania. Pass became interested in playing guitar after seeing Gene Autry perform in the Western film Ride, Tenderfoot, Ride.

Pass received his first guitar and started creating music at age 9. Pass stated his first guitar was a Harmony, and that he had asked for a guitar for his birthday. He began playing for neighbors, and learned chords from his father's Italian friends. He attended guitar lessons every Sunday with a local teacher for six to eight months and practiced for up to six hours per day, rapidly advancing in skill level. As he improved his craft, he participated in the local music scene of Johnstown, where he would enjoy the company of other guitarists and listen to the music that was being created.

Pass was finding paying gigs at dances and weddings in Johnstown as early as age 14, playing with bands led by Tony Pastor and Charlie Barnet, honing his guitar skills while "learning the ropes" in the music industry. He began traveling with small jazz groups and moved from Pennsylvania to New York City.

Pass would continue to perform with big bands until 1947, when he enlisted and served in the US military.

Pass developed an addiction to heroin after his tenure in the military had ended. He lived in New Orleans for a year, playing bebop at strip clubs. Pass later revealed that he had suffered a "nervous breakdown" in New Orleans due to virtually unlimited access to drugs that enabled the musician to engage in severe benders. Pass recalled, "I would come to New York a lot, then get strung out and leave."

Pass spent much of the 1950s in and out of prison for drug-related convictions. Pass said, "Staying high was my first priority; playing was second; girls were third. But the first thing really took all my energy." He recovered after a two-and-a-half-year stay in the Synanon rehabilitation program, largely putting his music on hold during his prison sentence.

== Career ==
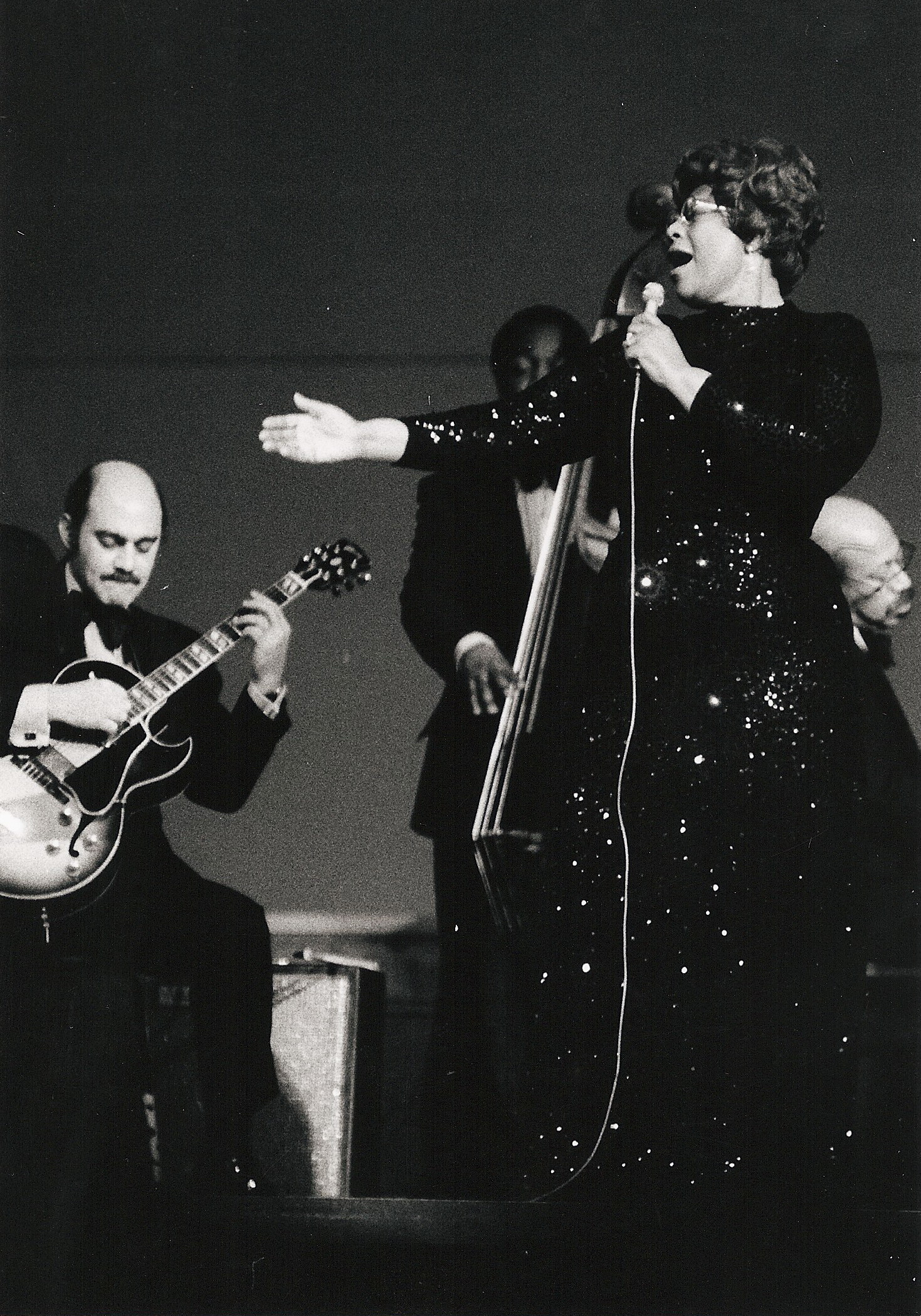
Ella Fitzgerald and Pass, 1974

Pass released his studio debut Sounds of Synanon on July 1, 1962.

Pass recorded and released a series of albums during the 1960s under Pacific Jazz Records, including Catch Me, 12-String Guitar, For Django, and Simplicity. In 1963, he received DownBeat magazine's New Star Award. He also played on Pacific Jazz recordings by Gerald Wilson, Bud Shank, and Les McCann. Pass was a member of the George Shearing Quintet from 1965 through 1967.

Throughout the 1960s, Pass primarily performed TV and recording session work in Los Angeles, including performing in television orchestras. Norman Granz, the producer of Jazz at the Philharmonic and the founder of Verve Records, signed Pass to Pablo Records in December 1973.

In December 1974, Pass released his solo album Virtuoso on Pablo. Also in 1974, Pablo released the album The Trio with Pass, Oscar Peterson, and Niels-Henning Ørsted Pedersen. He performed with them on many occasions throughout the 1970s and 1980s. At the Grammy Awards of 1975, The Trio won the Grammy Award for Best Jazz Performance by a Group. As part of the Pablo roster, Pass recorded with Benny Carter, Milt Jackson, Herb Ellis, Zoot Sims, Duke Ellington, Dizzy Gillespie, Ella Fitzgerald, and Count Basie.

Pass and Ella Fitzgerald recorded six albums together on Pablo toward the end of Fitzgerald's career: Take Love Easy (1973), Fitzgerald and Pass... Again (1976), Hamburg Duets - 1976 (1976), Sophisticated Lady (1975, 1983), Speak Love (1983), and Easy Living (1986).

== Later life and death ==
Pass was diagnosed with liver cancer in 1992. Although he was initially responsive to treatment and continued to play into 1993, his health eventually declined, forcing him to cancel his tour with Pepe Romero, Paco Peña, and Leo Kottke. Pass performed for the final time on May 7, 1994, with fellow guitarist John Pisano at a nightclub in Los Angeles. Pisano told Guitar Player that after the performance Pass said "I can't play anymore", an exchange that Pisano described as "like a knife in my heart." Pass died from liver cancer in Los Angeles 16 days later, at the age of 65. Prior to his death, he recorded an album of Hank Williams songs with country guitarist Roy Clark.

Speaking about Nuages: Live at Yoshi's, Volume 2, Jim Ferguson wrote:

The follow up to 1993's Joe Pass & Co. Live at Yoshi's, this release was colored by sad circumstances: both bassist Monty Budwig and Pass were stricken with fatal illnesses. Nevertheless, all concerned, including drummer Colin Bailey and second guitarist John Pisano, play up to their usual high levels...Issued posthumously, this material is hardly sub-standard. Bristling with energy throughout, it helps document the final stages in the career of a player who, arguably, was the greatest mainstream guitarist since Wes Montgomery.

== Artistry ==
=== Technique ===
Pass's playing style was particularly recognizable for his ability to play melody, harmony and basslines simultaneously or contrapuntally, both in-tempo and in an “un-metered” style. Pass's single-note playing style is similar to the instrumental stylings of classic bebop and hard bop, drawing comparisons to the tones and timbres of wind instruments used in jazz music, such as the saxophone and trumpet, as well as other string instruments such as the piano. Jazz educator Wolf Marshall said Pass's musical flavorings were "hornlike and on par with his wealth of ideas and immense vocabulary, allowing single-note improvisations to flow like a saxophonist's stream of consciousness."

As Pass's career progressed, he developed an increasingly harmonic approach to improvisation that made extensive use of chord-melody solos, which produced a similar effect to that of a piano. He also employed a variety of different picking techniques such as fingerpicking, hybrid picking and "flat picking".

Pass's style was also said to have exhibited a "tougher funky aspect" by incorporating string bends, double stops and partial chords that variously borrow from blues, R&B and swing styles.

=== Influences ===
Throughout the 1940s, Pass became interested in modern jazz sounds that were emerging from New York City, where he would jam with many quintessential bebop musicians. Pass cited Dizzy Gillespie, Charlie Parker, Art Tatum and Coleman Hawkins as influences during this time. Pass was later influenced by the piano stylings of Oscar Peterson. Ironically, only three of the various jazz musicians he had cited as influences on his playing were actually guitarists; he cited Charlie Christian, Django Reinhardt and Wes Montgomery as instrumental in his development as a musician.

== Equipment ==
On Pass's early recordings, he played Fender solid-body electric guitars, such as the Jaguar and Jazzmaster. Additionally, Pass experimented with a Fender Bass VI 6-string bass on his 1963 album Catch Me. In 1963, Pass was given as a gift a Gibson ES175D arch-top electric-acoustic guitar that had twin humbucking pickups.

== Legacy ==
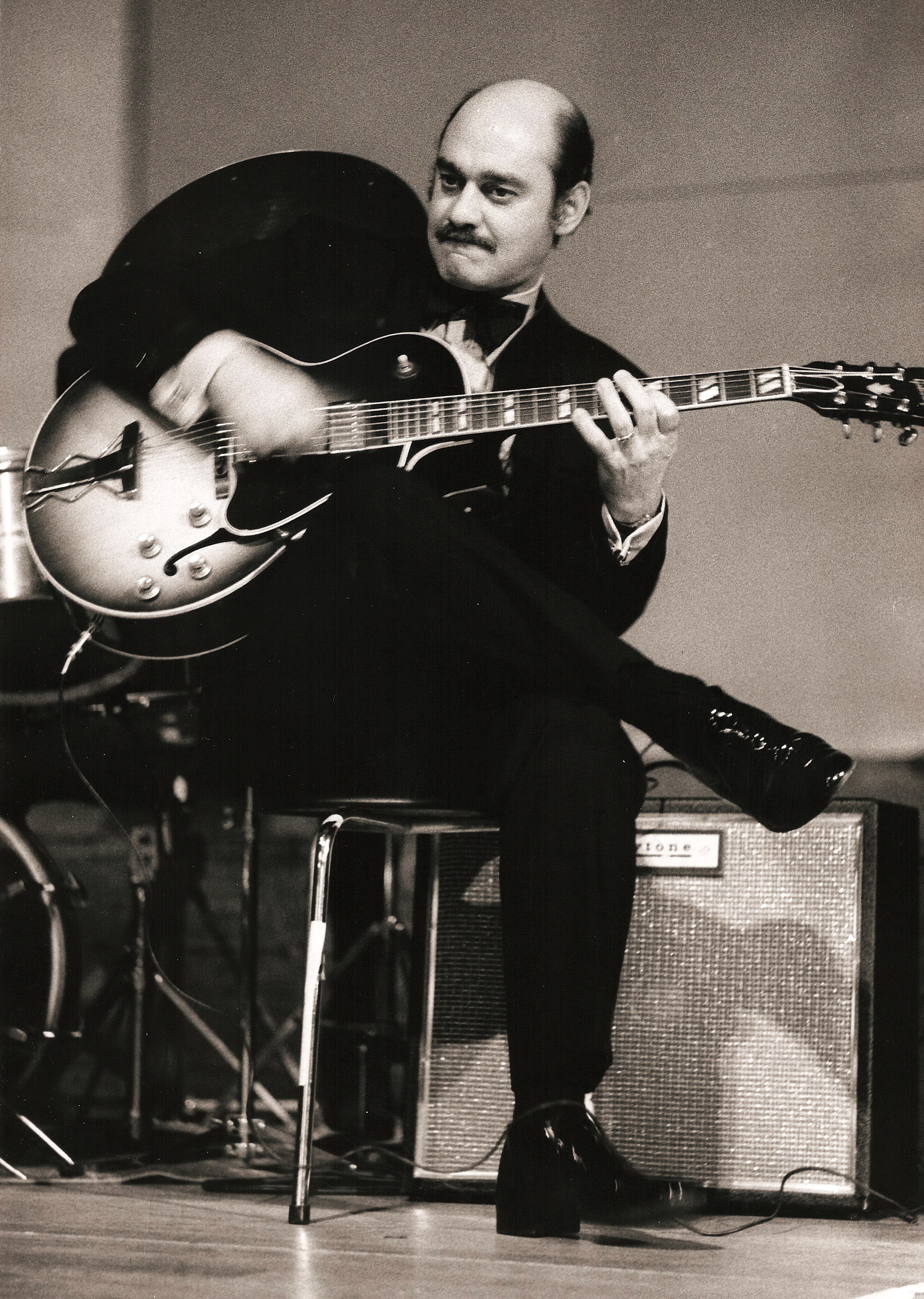
Pass in concert in 1974 playing his Gibson ES-175 guitar

New York magazine wrote: "Joe Pass looks like somebody's uncle and plays guitar like nobody's business. He's called 'the world's greatest' and often compared to Paganini for his virtuosity. There is a certain purity to his sound that makes him stand out easily from other first-rate jazz guitarists."

He weaves his own fast-moving chords and filigree work so nimbly that it is hard to believe fingers can physically shift so quickly. Slight moustached, fairly balding, he frowns over his fretwork like a worried head waiter with more guests than tables but the sound that comes out could only be the confident product of years of devotion to the instrument... But it is when he plays completely solo, which he does for half of each set, that he comes into his own, because without hindrance of the rhythm section he can completely orchestrate each number. Sometimes it is by contrasting out of tempo sections with fast-moving interludes, sometimes by switching mood from wistful to lightly swinging, sometimes by alternating single-note lines with chords or simultaneous bass line and melody – the possibilities seem endless.

— Miles Kington on Pass in an October 1974 article in The Times.

Veteran jazz writer Scott Yanow has conferred the titles of "the ultimate bebop guitarist", "the epitome of virtuoso guitarists", and "one of the top jazz voices of his generation" on Pass.

Internet personality and music “analyst” Rick Beato describes Pass as an early influence, and in several interviews has noted that among his adolescent achievements on the guitar was the performance of songs from Virtuoso at the encouragement of his father.

== Bibliography ==
- Mel Bay Presents Joe Pass "Off the Record." Mel Bay, 1993. ISBN 1-56222-687-8
- Complete Joe Pass. Mel Bay, 2003. ISBN 0-7866-6747-8
- Miyakaku, Takao. Joe Pass. Tokyo: Seiunsha, 2000. ISBN 4-434-00455-7 (photograph collection)
