= Oscar Peterson discography =

This article contains the discography of jazz pianist Oscar Peterson.

== Discography ==
=== Studio albums ===
Year	Album	Label		Notes
1950–1967: Verve years
10" LPs
1950	Piano Solos	Mercury	MG C-106	
1952	Oscar Peterson Collates	Mercury	MG C-110	
1952	Oscar Peterson Plays Pretty	Mercury	MG C-119	
1952	Collates, No. 2	Clef	MG C-127	
1954	Oscar Peterson Sings	Clef	MG C-145	
1954	Oscar Peterson Plays Pretty, Album #2	Clef	MG C-155	
1954	The Strolling Mr. Eldridge	Clef	MG C-162	with Roy Eldridge
1954	Lester Young with the Oscar Peterson Trio #1	Norgran	MG N-5	
1954	Lester Young with the Oscar Peterson Trio #2	Norgran	MG N-6	
12" LPs
1953	Oscar Peterson Plays Cole Porter	Clef/Mercury	MG C-603	
1953	Oscar Peterson Plays Irving Berlin	Clef/Mercury	MG C-604	
1953	Oscar Peterson Plays George Gershwin	Clef/Mercury	MG C-605	recorded in 1952
1953	Oscar Peterson Plays Duke Ellington	Clef/Mercury	MG C-606	recorded in 1952
1952?	Oscar Peterson Plays Jerome Kern	Clef	MG C-623	
1954	Oscar Peterson Plays Richard Rogers	Clef	MG C-624	
1954	Oscar Peterson Plays Vincent Youmans	Clef	MG C-625	
1955	Oscar Peterson Plays Harry Warren	Clef	MG C-648	
1954	Oscar Peterson Plays Harold Arlen	Clef	MG C-649	
1955	Oscar Peterson Plays Jimmy McHugh	Clef	MG C-650	
1955	The Oscar Peterson Quartet	Clef	MG C-688	with Barney Kessel, Ray Brown and Alvin Stoller
1954?	Recital	Clef	MG C-694	
1956	Nostalgic Memories	Clef	MG C-695	
1956	Tenderly	Clef	MG C-696	recorded between 1949 and 1951; reissued on CD in 2009 as Debut: The Clef/Mercury Duo Recordings 1949-1951
1956	Keyboard	Clef	MG C-697	recorded between 1949 and 1951; reissued on CD in 2009 as Debut: The Clef/Mercury Duo Recordings 1949-1951
1956	An Evening with Oscar Peterson	Clef	MGC-698	recorded between 1949 and 1951; reissued on CD in 2009 as Debut: The Clef/Mercury Duo Recordings 1949-1951
1956	Oscar Peterson Plays Count Basie	Clef	MG C-708	recorded in 1955
1955	Buddy DeFranco and Oscar Peterson Play George Gershwin	Norgran	MG N-1016	with Buddy DeFranco
1956	In a Romantic Mood	Verve	MG V-2002	recorded in 1955
1956	Pastel Moods	Verve	MG V-2004	
1961?	Romance: The Vocal Styling of Oscar Peterson	Verve	MG V-2012	
1959	Oscar Peterson Plays the Cole Porter Songbook	Verve	MG V-2052	
1959	Oscar Peterson Plays the Irving Berlin Songbook	Verve	MG V-2053	
1959	Oscar Peterson Plays the George Gershwin Songbook	Verve	MG V-2054	
1959	Oscar Peterson Plays the Duke Ellington Song Book	Verve	MG V-2055	recorded in 1959
1959	Oscar Peterson Plays the Jerome Kern Songbook	Verve	MG V-2056	recorded in 1959
1959	Oscar Peterson Plays the Richard Rodgers Songbook	Verve	MG V-2057	recorded in 1959
1959	Oscar Peterson Plays The Harry Warren and Vincent Youmans Song Books	Verve	MG V-2059	
1960	Oscar Peterson Plays the Harold Arlen Songbook	Verve	MG V-2060	recorded in 1959
1959	Oscar Peterson Plays the Jimmy McHugh Songbook	Verve	MG V-2061	
1957	Soft Sands	Verve	MG V-2079	
1958	Oscar Peterson Plays My Fair Lady	Verve	MG V6-2119	
1958	Jazz Giants '58	Verve	MG V-8248	recorded in 1957, with Stan Getz, Gerry Mulligan, Harry "Sweets" Edison
1958	Stan Getz and the Oscar Peterson Trio	Verve	MG V-8251	recorded in 1957, with Stan Getz
1959	Oscar Peterson Plays the Harry Warren Songbook	Verve		
1960	Swinging Brass with the Oscar Peterson Trio	Verve		recorded in 1959
1959	Louis Armstrong Meets Oscar Peterson	Verve	MG V-8322	recorded in 1957, with Louis Armstrong
1959	A Jazz Portrait of Frank Sinatra	Verve	MG V-8334	
1959	Oscar Peterson Plays Porgy & Bess	Verve	MG V-8340	
1959	Ben Webster Meets Oscar Peterson	Verve	MG V-8349	recorded in 1959, with Ben Webster
1959	The Jazz Soul of Oscar Peterson	Verve	MG V-8351	
1960	Fiorello!	Verve		
1962	West Side Story	Verve		
1962	Bursting Out with the All-Star Big Band!	Verve		
1962	Affinity	Verve		
1963	Night Train	Verve		recorded in 1962
1963	Oscar Peterson and Nelson Riddle	Verve	V6-8562	with Nelson Riddle; issued 1964 in the US
1964	The Oscar Peterson Trio Plays	Verve		
1964	We Get Requests	Verve		
1964	Oscar Peterson Trio + One	Mercury		with Clark Terry
1965	More Swinging Standards	Verve		recorded in 1959
1965	Canadiana Suite	Limelight		recorded in 1964
1965	With Respect to Nat	Mercury / Limelight		
1966	Blues Etude	Limelight		recorded in 1965, 1966
1967	Soul Español	Limelight		recorded in 1966
1968–1974: MPS years
1968	Action	MPS		recorded in 1964
1968	The Way I Really Play	MPS		recorded in 1967
1968	Girl Talk	MPS		recorded in 1965, 1966, 1967, 1968
1968	My Favorite Instrument	MPS		
1968	Travelin' On	MPS		
1969	Mellow Mood	MPS		recorded in 1968
1969	Motions and Emotions	MPS		
1970	Hello Herbie	MPS		recorded in 1969, with Herb Ellis
1970	Tristeza on Piano	MPS		
1971	Walking the Line	MPS		recorded in 1970
1971	Another Day	MPS		recorded in 1970
1971	Tracks	MPS		recorded in 1970
1971	In Tune	MPS		with The Singers Unlimited
1972	Reunion Blues	MPS		recorded in 1971, with Milt Jackson, Ray Brown and Louis Hayes
1973	Oscar Peterson–Stephane Grappelli Quartet, Vol. 1	America (France)	AM 6129	French/Canadian exclusive release
1973	Oscar Peterson–Stephane Grappelli Quartet, Vol. 2	America (France)	AM 6131	French/Canadian exclusive release
1974	Great Connection	MPS		recorded in 1971
1974–1987: Pablo years
1974	Terry's Tune	Pablo		Japanese exclusive release
1974	Oscar Peterson and Dizzy Gillespie	Pablo		with Dizzy Gillespie
1974	Jousts	Pablo		credited to Oscar Peterson and the Trumpet Kings; won Grammy Award for Best Jazz Performance by a Soloist
1974	Satch and Josh	Pablo		with Count Basie
1974	The Giants	Pablo		with Joe Pass, Ray Brown, won Grammy Award for Best Jazz Performance by a Soloist
1974	Oscar Peterson and Harry Edison	Pablo		with Harry "Sweets" Edison
1975	Oscar Peterson and Roy Eldridge	Pablo		recorded in 1974, with Roy Eldridge
1975	Oscar Peterson and Clark Terry	Pablo		with Clark Terry
1975	Ella and Oscar	Pablo		with Ella Fitzgerald
1975	Oscar Peterson and Jon Faddis	Pablo		with Jon Faddis
1976	Porgy and Bess	Pablo		with Joe Pass
1978	Satch and Josh...Again	Pablo		recorded in 1977, with Count Basie
1979	The Silent Partner	Pablo		film score
1979	Night Child	Pablo		with Joe Pass, Niels-Henning Ørsted Pedersen and Louie Bellson
1980	Night Rider	Pablo		recorded in 1978, with Count Basie
1980	The Personal Touch	Pablo		
1980	The Trumpet Summit Meets the Oscar Peterson Big 4	Pablo		with Dizzy Gillespie, Freddie Hubbard, Clark Terry
1981	A Royal Wedding Suite	Pablo		
1982	Ain't but a Few of Us Left	Pablo		recorded in 1981, with Milt Jackson, Ray Brown, Grady Tate
1982	Face to Face	Pablo		with Freddie Hubbard
1982	Oscar Peterson with Clark Terry	Pablo		with Clark Terry
1983	Count Basie Meets Oscar Peterson – The Timekeepers	Pablo		recorded in 1978, with Count Basie
1983	Two of the Few	Pablo		with Milt Jackson
1984	A Tribute to My Friends	Pablo		recorded in 1983
1985	Hark	Pablo		with Buddy DeFranco
1986	Yessir, That's My Baby	Pablo		recorded in 1978, with Count Basie
1986	If You Could See Me Now	Pablo		recorded in 1983
1987	Oscar Peterson + Harry Edison + Eddie "Cleanhead" Vinson	Pablo		with Eddie "Cleanhead" Vinson and Harry "Sweets" Edison recorded in 1986
1987	Benny Carter Meets Oscar Peterson	Pablo		with Benny Carter recorded in 1986
1994–2000: Telarc years
1994	Side by Side	Telarc		with Itzhak Perlman
1995	An Oscar Peterson Christmas	Telarc		
1995	The More I See You	Telarc		with Benny Carter, Clark Terry, Ray Brown
1996	Oscar Peterson Meets Roy Hargrove and Ralph Moore	Telarc		with Roy Hargrove and Ralph Moore
1998	Oscar and Benny	Telarc		recorded in 1997, with Benny Green
2000	Trail of Dreams: A Canadian Suite	Telarc		A Jazz suite with strings conducted by Michel Legrand

=== Live albums ===
Year	Title	Label	Notes
1951	Oscar Peterson at Carnegie	Mercury	10"; MG C-107
1952	Oscar Peterson At Carnegie Hall	Mercury	recorded between 1949 and 1951, MG C-107 (rec Sept 18 1949-NYC) [re-issued on CD in 2009 as Debut: The Clef/Mercury Duo Recordings 1949-1951]
1957	Oscar Peterson at the Stratford Shakespearean Festival	Verve	MG V-8024; recorded in 1956, with Herb Ellis
1957	The Oscar Peterson Trio with Sonny Stitt, Roy Eldridge and Jo Jones at Newport	American Recording Society / Verve	MG V-8239; with Sonny Stitt, Roy Eldridge and Jo Jones
1958	The Oscar Peterson Trio at the Concertgebouw	Verve	MG V-8268; recorded in 1957
1958	On the Town with the Oscar Peterson Trio	Verve	MG V-8287
1961	The Trio: Live from Chicago	Verve	recorded at the London House, Chicago
1962	The Sound of the Trio	Verve	V-8480; recorded in 1961 at the London House, Chicago
1965	Eloquence	Limelight	
1966	Put On a Happy Face	Verve	V6-8660; recorded in 1961 at the London House, Chicago
1966	Something Warm	Verve	V6-8681; recorded in 1961 at the London House, Chicago; released in the US in 1967
1974	The Trio	Pablo	recorded in 1973 at the London House, Chicago; with Joe Pass, Niels-Henning Ørsted Pedersen, won Grammy Award for Best Jazz Performance by a Group
1974	The Good Life	Pablo	recorded in 1973 as above
1975	The Oscar Peterson Trio in Tokyo 1964	Pablo	recorded in 1964
1975	The Greatest Jazz Concert in the World	Pablo	recorded in 1967
1975	Oscar Peterson in Russia	Pablo	recorded in 1974
1975	The Oscar Peterson Big 6 at Montreux	Pablo	
1975	Oscar Peterson et Joe Pass à Salle Pleyel	Pablo	with Joe Pass
1977	The Oscar Peterson Trio in Tokyo	Denon	recorded in 1972
1977	Oscar Peterson Jam – Montreux '77	Pablo	won Grammy Award for Best Jazz Performance by a Soloist
1977	Oscar Peterson and the Bassists – Montreux '77	Pablo	with Ray Brown, Niels-Henning Ørsted Pedersen
1977	The Pablo All-Stars Jam – Montreux '77	Pablo	various artists
1979	Skol	Pablo	with Stephane Grappelli, Joe Pass, Mickey Roker
1979	The Paris Concert	Pablo	recorded in 1978
1979	The London Concert	Pablo	recorded in 1978
1979	Digital at Montreux	Pablo	
1980	Live at the North Sea Jazz Festival, 1980	Pablo	
1981	Nigerian Marketplace	Pablo	
1983	Freedom Song	Pablo	recorded in 1982
1983	Jazz at the Philharmonic – Yoyogi National Stadium, Tokyo 1983: Return to Happiness	Pablo	various artists
1990	Oscar Peterson Live!	Pablo	recorded in 1986
1990	Live at the Blue Note	Telarc	won Grammy Award for Best Jazz Instrumental Performance, Group, Grammy Award for Best Jazz Performance by a Soloist
1991	Time After Time	Telarc	recorded in 1986
1991	Saturday Night at the Blue Note	Telarc	won Grammy Award for Best Jazz Instrumental Performance, Group
1992	Last Call at the Blue Note	Telarc	recorded in 1990
1992	In the Key of Oscar	Vocal Vision Productions Inc.	5 tracks recorded live at the Bermuda Onion, Toronto, 11 June 1991 + 7 electronic selections
1993	En Concert avec Europe1	RTÉ / Trema	recorded in 1961, 1963–66 & 1969. 12 tracks feature Brown/Thigpen. Others include Bobby Durham, Louise Hayes, Sam Jones and Roy Eldridge on two tracks.
1993	Encore at the Blue Note	Telarc	recorded in 1990
1995	Exclusively for My Friends: The Lost Tapes	MPS	recorded in 1965, 1967, 1968
1996	Ljubljana 1964	Promo Sound AG	recorded on July 29, 1964
1997	Live at CBC Studios, 1960	Just a Memory	recorded in 1960, with Brown and Thigpen
1997	Oscar in Paris	Telarc	
1997	A Tribute to Oscar Peterson – Live at the Town Hall	Telarc	live tribute album
1999	Summer Night in Munich	Telarc	recorded in 1998
1999	The Very Tall Band: Live at the Blue Note	Telarc	recorded in 1998
2001	The Tenor Giants Featuring Oscar Peterson	Pablo	recorded in 1975, with Zoot Sims and Eddie "Lockjaw" Davis
2002	Solo	Pablo	recorded in 1972
2004	A Night in Vienna	Verve	recorded in 2003
2007	The Very Tall Band: What's Up?	Telarc	recorded in 1998
2014	During This Time	Art of Groove	[CD + DVD-Video] recorded in 1972 with Ben Webster
2015	Oscar Peterson Trio Live in Cologne 1963	Jazzline	recorded in 1963, with Ray Brown (Bass) and Ed Thigpen (Drums)
2022	On a Clear Day: The Oscar Peterson Trio – Live in Zurich 1971	Mack Avenue Music Group	recorded at Zurich Kongresshaus – Zurich, Switzerland • November 24, 1971 by Radio Zurich with Niels-Henning Ørsted Pedersen (Bass) and Louis Hayes (Drums)

=== Compilations ===
Year	Title	Label	Notes
1952	This Is Oscar Peterson	RCA Victor	10"
1956	The President Plays with the Oscar Peterson Trio	Norgran	MG N-1054; compiles Lester Young with the Oscar Peterson Trio #1 & Lester Young with the Oscar Peterson Trio #2
1967	Thoroughly Modern 'Twenties	Verve	recorded in 1959
1974	The History of an Artist	Pablo	2xLP; recorded between 1972 and 1974
1974	Oscar Peterson–Stephane Grappelli Quartet	Prestige	with Stéphane Grappelli; 2xLP; compiles Oscar Peterson–Stephane Grappelli Quartet, Vol. 1 (America (France), 1973) & Oscar Peterson–Stephane Grappelli Quartet, Vol. 2 (America (France), 1973); recorded 1973.
1976	I Got Rhythm: Oscar Peterson Trio, Vol. 1	RCA	
1976	Rockin' in Rhythm: Oscar Peterson Trio, Vol. 2	RCA	
1983	The History of an Artist, Vol. 2	Pablo	recorded in 1972
1987	Oscar Peterson Plays Jazz Standards	Verve	
1987	Compact Jazz	Mercury	compilation of recordings 1964–1966
1992	Jazz 'Round Midnight	Verve	compilation of recordings 1951–1971
2006	Fly Me to the Moon	Verve/UMG	

=== Box sets ===
Year	Title	Label	Notes
1970	Exclusively for My Friends	MPS / Verve	4xLP, reissued as 4xCD (1992) and 8xCD (2015); recorded between 1963 and 1968
1996	The London House Sessions	Polygram	5xCD; recorded in 1961 at the London House, Chicago
2009	Debut: The Clef/Mercury Duo Recordings 1949–1951	Hip-O Select	3xCD; compiles At Carnegie Hall, Tenderly, Keyboard, and An Evening with Oscar Peterson

=== 7" EPs ===
- Oscar Peterson Plays Irving Berlin (Mercury, EP-107, 1953, 7")

=== Appears on ===
Year	Title	Label	Notes
1955	Piano Interpretations	Norgran	MG N-1036; appears on three tracks
1956	Jazz at the Philharmonic 1955, Volume 2	Columbia	live; appears on Side 1; split with the Gene Krupa Quartet
1956	The Modern Jazz Quartet and the Oscar Peterson Trio at the Opera House	Verve	MG V-8269; live; appears on Side 2; split with the Modern Jazz Quartet
1965	I/We Had a Ball	Limelight	appears on one track

== As sideman ==
Year	Artist	Title	Label	Notes
1952	Benny Carter	Alone Together	Norgran	
1952	Count Basie	Basie Jazz	Clef	
1952	Roy Eldridge	Rockin' Chair	Clef	
1952	Gene Krupa and Buddy Rich	The Drum Battle	Verve	live
1953	Fred Astaire	The Astaire Story	Norgran	recorded in 1952
1954	Lester Young	Lester Young with the Oscar Peterson Trio	Norgram	
1954	Lionel Hampton	Lionel Hampton Plays Love Songs	Clef	
1954	Lionel Hampton	Hamp's Big Four	Verve	MGV-8117
1954	Roy Eldridge	Little Jazz	Clef	
1954	Roy Eldridge and Dizzy Gillespie	Roy and Diz	Clef	
1954	Flip Phillips	Rock with Flip	Clef	
1954	Roy Eldridge and His Orchestra	Dale's Wail	Clef	MG C-705
1954	Benny Carter	Benny Carter Plays Pretty	Norgran	
1954	Benny Carter	New Jazz Sounds	Norgran	
1955	Buddy Rich	Sing and Swing with Buddy Rich	Norgran	
1955	Ralph Burns	Ralph Burns Among the JATP's	Norgran	
1956	Benny Carter	Cosmopolite	Norgran	recorded between 1952–1954
1956	Buddy Rich	The Wailing Buddy Rich	Norgran	recorded in 1955
1956	Lester Young and Harry "Sweets" Edison	Pres and Sweets	Norgran	recorded in 1955
1956	Herb Ellis	Ellis in Wonderland	Norgran	
1956	Gene Krupa, Buddy Rich	Krupa and Rich	Clef / Verve	
1956	Toni Harper	Toni	Verve	
1956	Ella Fitzgerald and Louis Armstrong	Ella and Louis	Verve / Polygram	
1957	Anita O'Day	Anita Sings the Most	Verve	
1957	Stuff Smith	Stuff Smith	Verve	
1957	Ella Fitzgerald and Louis Armstrong	Ella and Louis Again	Verve	
1957	Lester Young and Harry Edison	Going for Myself	Verve	
1957	Sonny Stitt	Only the Blues	Verve	
1957	Ben Webster	Soulville	Verve	
1957	Coleman Hawkins	The Genius of Coleman Hawkins	Verve	
1957	Coleman Hawkins	Coleman Hawkins Encounters Ben Webster	Verve	
1957	Coleman Hawkins	Coleman Hawkins and Confrères	Verve	
1957	Ella Fitzgerald	Ella Fitzgerald Sings the Duke Ellington Song Book	Verve	
1957	Stan Getz and J. J. Johnson	Stan Getz and J. J. Johnson at the Opera House	Verve	live
1958	Harry "Sweets" Edison	Gee Baby, Ain't I Good to You	Verve	
1958	Ray Brown	This Is Ray Brown	Verve	
1958	Ella Fitzgerald	At the Opera House	Verve	live, recorded in 1957
1959	Stan Getz	Stan Getz and Gerry Mulligan / Stan Getz and The Oscar Peterson Trio	Verve	
1959	Sonny Stitt	Sonny Stitt Sits in with the Oscar Peterson Trio	Verve	
1962	Milt Jackson	Very Tall	Verve	recorded in 1961
1963	Bill Henderson	Bill Henderson with the Oscar Peterson Trio	Verve	
1972	Ella Fitzgerald	Jazz at Santa Monica Civic '72	Pablo	3xLP box set; live at Santa Monica Civic Auditorium on June 2, 1972
1974	Count Basie	Basie and Friends	Pablo	
1975	Roy Eldridge	Happy Time	Pablo	
1975	Roy Eldridge & Dizzy Gillespie	Jazz Maturity...Where It's Coming From	Pablo	
1975	Zoot Sims	Zoot Sims and the Gershwin Brothers	Pablo	
1975	The Trumpet Kings	The Trumpet Kings at Montreux '75	Pablo	live
1975	Milt Jackson	The Milt Jackson Big 4 at the Montreux Jazz Festival 1975	Pablo	live
1977	Eddie "Lockjaw" Davis	Eddie "Lockjaw" Davis 4 – Montreux '77	Pablo	live
1977	Roy Eldridge	Roy Eldridge 4 – Montreux '77	Pablo	live
1978	Sarah Vaughan	How Long Has This Been Going On?	Pablo	
1979	Clark Terry	Ain't Misbehavin'	Pablo	
1980	Dizzy Gillespie, Freddie Hubbard, Clark Terry	The Alternate Blues	Pablo	
1988	Ella Fitzgerald	Ella in Rome: The Birthday Concert	Verve	live, recorded in 1958
1995	Ray Brown	Some of My Best Friends Are...The Piano Players	Telarc	recorded in 1994
1999	Dorothy Dandridge	Smooth Operator	Verve	recorded in 1958, 1961
2000	Sarah Vaughan	Linger Awhile: Live at Newport and More	Pablo	live, recorded in 1957, 1978, 1982

== Filmography ==
- 1958 Les Tricheurs (Fontana Records)
- 1978 The Silent Partner (Movie Score)
- 1996 Life of A Legend (View Video)
- 1998 London: 1964 (Vidjazz)
- 2004 Music in the Key of Oscar (View Video)
- 2004 Easter Suite for Jazz Trio (TDK)
- 2004 A Night in Vienna (Verve)
- 2004 Norman Granz' Jazz in Montreux Presents Oscar Peterson Trio '77 (Eagle Vision USA)
- 2007 The Berlin Concert (Inakustik)
- 2007 Reunion Blues (Salt Peanuts)
- 2008 Oscar Peterson & Count Basie: Together in Concert 1974 (Impro-Jazz Spain)
- 2008 Jazz Icons: Oscar Peterson Live in '63, '64 & '65 (Jazz Icons)
- 2014 During This Time: Oscar Peterson, Ben Webster. NDR Jazzworkshop 1972 (art of groove)
- 2020 Oscar Peterson: Black + White
