= The London House Sessions =

Live album by Oscar Peterson
- Released: 1996
- Recorded: July 27 – August 6, 1961
- Genre: Jazz
- Length: 316:39
- Label: Polygram
- Producer: Richard Seidel

Oscar Peterson chronology
Very Tall (1961)	The London House Sessions (1996)	West Side Story (1962)

Professional ratings
Review scores
Source	Rating
AllMusic	4/5 stars
The Penguin Guide to Jazz Recordings	3.5/4 stars

The London House Sessions is a compilation album collecting music recorded by the Oscar Peterson Trio at the London House jazz club in Chicago in the summer of 1961.

Selected tracks from these concerts were previously released on four albums in 1961 and 1962: The Trio, The Sound of the Trio, Put On a Happy Face, and Something Warm. Those albums are included as part of the complete Sessions, along with 23 previously unreleased tracks (including several versions of frequent set-closer "Billy Boy"). Several additional tracks were subsequently included on the CD reissues of The Trio and The Sound of the Trio.

The London House Sessions was initially released on four LPs. It was also released as a five CD box set in 1996 by Polygram.

== Track listing ==
Disc One

No.	Title	Writer(s)	Original release	Length
1.	"I've Never Been in Love Before"	Frank Loesser	The Trio	5:35
2.	"In the Wee Small Hours of the Morning"	Bob Hilliard, David Mann	The Trio	8:07
3.	"Chicago"	Fred Fisher	The Trio	8:55
4.	"The Night We Called It a Day"	Tom Adair, Matt Dennis	The Trio	4:47
5.	"Sometimes I'm Happy"	Irving Caesar, Clifford Grey, Vincent Youmans	The Trio	11:41
6.	"Whisper Not"	Benny Golson	The Trio	5:46
7.	"Billy Boy"	Traditional	The Trio	1:46
8.	"Tricotism (Tractitism)"	Oscar Pettiford	The Sound of the Trio	11:08
9.	"Billy Boy"	Traditional	Previously unreleased	3:05

Disc Two

No.	Title	Writer(s)	Original release	Length
10.	"On Green Dolphin Street"	Bronislaw Kaper, Ned Washington	The Sound of the Trio	8:52
11.	"Thag's Dance"	Oscar Peterson	The Sound of the Trio	5:40
12.	"Ill Wind"	Harold Arlen, Ted Koehler	The Sound of the Trio	5:33
13.	"Kadota's Blues"	Peterson	The Sound of the Trio	11:06
14.	"Put On a Happy Face"	Lee Adams, Charles Strouse	Put On a Happy Face	8:31
15.	"Old Folks"	Dedette Lee Hill, Willard Robison	Put On a Happy Face	4:27
16.	"Woody 'n' You"	Dizzy Gillespie	Put On a Happy Face	3:58
17.	"Yesterdays"	Otto Harbach, Jerome Kern	Put On a Happy Face	3:32

Disc Three

No.	Title	Writer(s)	Original release	Length
18.	"Diablo"	Peterson	Put On a Happy Face	6:59
19.	"Soon"	George Gershwin, Ira Gershwin	Put On a Happy Face	4:51
20.	"The Lonesome One"	Peterson	Put On a Happy Face	7:09
21.	"There Is No Greater Love"	Isham Jones, Marty Symes	Something Warm	5:00
22.	"I Remember Clifford"	Benny Golson	Something Warm	9:48
23.	"Autumn Leaves"	Joseph Kosma, Johnny Mercer, Jacques Prévert	Something Warm	5:04
24.	"Blues for Big Scotia"	Peterson	Something Warm	6:46
25.	"Swamp Fire"	Harold Mooney	Something Warm	3:58
26.	"I Love You"	Cole Porter	Something Warm	6:38
27.	"It Happened in Monterey"	Billy Rose, Mabel Wayne	Previously unreleased	6:23
28.	"Billy Boy"	Traditional	Previously unreleased	3:12

Disc Four

No.	Title	Writer(s)	Original release	Length
29.	"Introduction"		Previously unreleased	0:50
30.	"On Green Dolphin Street"	Kaper, Washington	" "	7:46
31.	"Moanin'"	Bobby Timmons	" "	6:29
32.	"Billy Boy"	Traditional	" "	2:36
33.	"Scrapple from the Apple"	Charlie Parker	" "	9:19
34.	"Jim"	Caesar Petrillo, Milton Samuels, Nelson Shawn	" "	8:55
35.	"Band Call"	Duke Ellington	" "	7:41
36.	"The Night We Called It a Day"	Tom Adair, Matt Dennis	" "	5:05
37.	"The Lonesome One"	Peterson	" "	5:26
38.	"The Gravy Waltz"	Steve Allen, Ray Brown	" "	4:45
39.	"Woody 'n' You"	Dizzy Gillespie	" "	3:48
40.	"Soon"	George Gershwin, Ira Gershwin	" "	9:19
41.	"Daahoud"	Clifford Brown	" "	5:51

Disc Five

No.	Title	Writer(s)	Original release	Length
42.	"As Long as There's Music"	Sammy Cahn, Jule Styne	Previously unreleased	5:49
43.	"Close Your Eyes"	Bernice Petkere	" "	6:05
44.	"Cubano Chant"	Ray Bryant	" "	9:48
45.	"Sometimes I'm Happy"	Caesar, Grey, Youmans	" "	10:56
46.	"Sophisticated Lady"	Duke Ellington, Irving Mills, Mitchell Parish	" "	10:31
47.	"Better Luck Next Time"	Irving Berlin	" "	7:30
48.	"Confirmation"	Charlie Parker	" "	10:13

Notes

- All tracks recorded between July 27 and August 6, 1961, at the London House, Chicago.
- Tracks 37-41 subsequently included on the 1997 CD reissue of The Trio.
- Track 40 ends abruptly (but ends with fade out on the CD reissue of The Trio).
- Tracks 32-36 subsequently included on the 2000 CD reissue of The Sound of The Trio.

== Personnel ==
Performance

- Oscar Peterson – piano
- Ray Brown – double bass
- Ed Thigpen – drums

Production

- Richard Seidel – executive producer
- Michael Lang – supervisor
- Ben Young – researcher, restorer
