= Freedom Song (Oscar Peterson album) =

Live album by Oscar Peterson
- Released: 1983
- Recorded: February 20–21, 1982
- Genre: Jazz
- Length: 43:23
- Label: Pablo
- Producer: Norman Granz

Oscar Peterson chronology
Ain't But a Few of Us Left (1981)	Freedom Song (1983)	Face to Face (1982)

Professional ratings
Review scores
Source	Rating
Allmusic	4/5 stars
The Penguin Guide to Jazz Recordings	3/4 stars

Freedom Song is a 1982 live album by Oscar Peterson, recorded in Japan.

== Track listing ==
1. "'Round Midnight" (Bernie Hanighen, Thelonious Monk, Cootie Williams) – 6:41
2. Medley: "Watch What Happens"/"Waltz for Debby" (Norman Gimbel, Michel Legrand)/(Bill Evans, Gene Lees) – 8:43
3. "Easy Living" (Ralph Rainger, Leo Robin) – 5:42
4. "Move" (Denzil Best) – 4:03
5. Medley: "Hymn to Freedom"/"The Fallen Warrior" (Oscar Peterson)/(Peterson) – 10:34
6. "Sweet Lorraine" (Carter Burwell, Mitchell Parish) – 7:17
7. "You Look Good to Me" (Seymour Lefco, Clement Wells) – 6:27
8. "Now's the Time" (Charlie Parker) – 8:15
9. "Future Child" (Niels-Henning Ørsted Pedersen) – 1:51
10. "Mississauga Rattler" (Peterson) – 7:45
11. "Nigerian Marketplace" (Peterson) – 7:12
12. Medley: "Emily"/"Tenderly" (Johnny Mandel, Johnny Mercer)/(Walter Gross Jack Lawrence) – 11:28
13. "Night Child" (Peterson) – 10:51
14. "The Cakewalk" (Peterson) – 6:25

== Personnel ==
=== Performance ===
- Martin Drew – drums
- Joe Pass – guitar
- Niels-Henning Ørsted Pedersen – double bass
- Oscar Peterson – piano
