= Night Child =

Night Child may refer to:

- Night Child (album), a 1979 album by Oscar Peterson
  - "Night Child", a song from that album
- The Cursed Medallion, a 1975 Italian horror film, also released as The Night Child
- Night Child (1956 film), a Swedish crime drama film

== See also ==
- Nightchild, a novel in the Chronicles of the Raven trilogy
