= Put On a Happy Face (album) =

Live album by The Oscar Peterson Trio
- Released: 1966
- Recorded: July 28–29, 1961
- Genre: Jazz
- Label: Verve
- Producer: Norman Granz

Oscar Peterson chronology
| With Respect to Nat (1965) | Put On a Happy Face (1966) | Blues Etude (1966) |

Professional ratings
Review scores
| Source | Rating |
|---|---|
| Allmusic | 3/5 stars |

Put On a Happy Face is a 1966 live album by the Oscar Peterson Trio, recorded in sessions in 1961 at the London House jazz club in Chicago.

Three other Oscar Peterson Trio albums were also released featuring music from the London House concerts: The Trio, The Sound of the Trio, and Something Warm. The complete sessions were released on CD in 1996 as The London House Sessions.

== Track listing ==
Side One

1. "Put On a Happy Face" (Lee Adams, Charles Strouse)
2. "Old Folks" (Dedette Lee Hill, Willard Robison)
3. "Woody 'n' You" (Dizzy Gillespie)
4. "Yesterdays" (Otto Harbach, Jerome Kern)

Side Two

5. "Diablo" (Oscar Peterson)
6. "Soon" (George Gershwin, Ira Gershwin)
7. "The Lonesome One" (Peterson)

== Personnel ==
- Oscar Peterson – piano
- Ray Brown – double bass
- Ed Thigpen – drums
