= Oscar Peterson et Joe Pass à Salle Pleyel =

Live album by Oscar Peterson and Joe Pass
- Released: 1975
- Recorded: March 17, 1975
- Venue: Salle Pleyel, Paris
- Genre: Jazz
- Length: 95:35
- Label: Pablo
- Producer: Norman Granz

Oscar Peterson chronology
| Oscar Peterson and Harry Edison (1974) | Oscar Peterson et Joe Pass à Salle Pleyel (1975) | Oscar Peterson and Clark Terry (1975) |

Joe Pass chronology
| Live at Donte's (1974) | Oscar Peterson et Joe Pass à Salle Pleyel (1975) | Joe Pass at the Montreux Jazz Festival 1975 (1975) |

Professional ratings
Review scores
| Source | Rating |
|---|---|
| Allmusic | 3/5 stars |
| The Penguin Guide to Jazz Recordings | 4/4 stars |

Oscar Peterson et Joe Pass à Salle Pleyel is an album by Oscar Peterson and Joe Pass that was released in 1975.

== Track listing ==
| No. | Title | Length |
|---|---|---|
| 1. | "I Gotta Right to Sing the Blues" (Harold Arlen/Ted Koehler) | 5:06 |
| 2. | "Mirage" (Oscar Peterson) | 3:05 |
| 3. | "Tenderly" (Walter Gross/Jack Lawrence) | 7:57 |
| 4. | "Back Home Again in Indiana" (James F. Hanley/Ballard MacDonald) | 3:58 |
| 5. | "It Never Entered My Mind" (Lorenz Hart/Richard Rodgers) | 5:42 |
| 6. | "Ellingtonia: Take the "A" Train/In a Sentimental Mood/Satin Doll/Lady of the Lavender Mist/Things Ain't What They Used to Be" (Duke Ellington/Billy Strayhorn/Johnny Mercer/Mercer Ellington/Ted Persons) | 9:28 |
| 7. | "Sweet Georgia Brown" (Ben Bernie/Kenneth Casey/Maceo Pinkard) | 5:51 |
| 8. | "Darn That Dream" (Eddie DeLange/Jimmy Van Heusen) | 6:16 |
| 9. | "Medley: The Summer Knows/What Are You Doing the Rest of Your Life?" (Alan Bergman/Marilyn Bergman/Michel Legrand) | 6:58 |
| 10. | "Ev'rything I Love" (Cole Porter) | 5:03 |
| 11. | "It's All Right with Me" (Porter) | 5:56 |
| 12. | "Stella by Starlight" (Victor Young) | 7:16 |
| 13. | "Just You, Just Me" (Jesse Greer/Raymond Klages) | 4:22 |
| 14. | "If" (David Gates) | 8:18 |
| 15. | "Honeysuckle Rose" (Andy Razaf/Fats Waller) | 5:29 |
| 16. | "Blues for Bise" | 7:53 |
| 17. | "Pleyel Bis" (Pass/Peterson) | 6:16 |

== Personnel ==
- Oscar Peterson - piano
- Joe Pass - guitar
- Norman Granz - producer

== Chart positions ==
| Year | Chart | Position |
|---|---|---|
| 1975 | Billboard Jazz Albums | 25 |
