= Cakewalk (Oscar Peterson composition) =

Jazz composition by Oscar Peterson

Cakewalk is a jazz composition by Canadian jazz pianist Oscar Peterson, one of his best known originals. A live version of the song appeared on his 1981 album Nigerian Marketplace. He performed it live on numerous occasions in a group. He played it with the Oscar Peterson trio live at the Berlin Philharmonic on July 2, 1985. He opened with it live in Tokyo in 1987 with Joe Pass and Dave Young. It also featured on his 2004 album A Night in Vienna. Biographer Alex Barris noted that Peterson often played "Cakewalk", a "rollicking profane stride", in contrast to his delicate "The Love Ballade". Coda Magazine remarked that it gave Peterson the opportunity to show off his stride piano chops.
