= Trail of Dreams: A Canadian Suite =

Studio album by Oscar Peterson
- Released: October 24, 2000
- Recorded: April 12, 13, 2000
- Genre: Jazz
- Label: Telarc
- Producers: Robert Woods, Elaine Martone

Oscar Peterson chronology
The Very Tall Band: Live at the Blue Note (1999)	Trail of Dreams: A Canadian Suite (2000)	A Night in Vienna (2004)

Professional ratings
Review scores
Source	Rating
Allmusic	3/5 stars
The Penguin Guide to Jazz Recordings	3/4 stars

Trail of Dreams: A Canadian Suite is a 2000 studio album by Oscar Peterson. The album is a suite dedicated to Peterson's native Canada, arranged by Michel Legrand.

== Track listing ==
1. "Open Spaces" – 7:13
2. "Morning in Newfoundland" – 3:55
3. "The Okanagan Valley" – 4:37
4. "Dancetron" – 4:02
5. "Ballad to P.E.I." – 3:00
6. "Cookin' on the Trail" – 4:06
7. "Banff the Beautiful" – 5:40
8. "Lonesome Prairie" – 3:35
9. "The French Fiddler" – 3:05
10. "Harcourt Nights" – 5:12
11. "Manitoba Minuet" – 5:25
12. "Anthem to a New Land" – 2:33

All music composed by Oscar Peterson.

== Personnel ==
Performance

- Oscar Peterson – piano
- Ulf Wakenius – guitar
- Niels-Henning Ørsted Pedersen – double bass
- Martin Drew – drums
- Michel Legrand – arranger, conductor

== See also ==
- Canadiana Suite (Limelight, 1965)
