= Great Connection =

Studio album by Oscar Peterson
- Released: 1974
- Recorded: October 1971
- Genre: Jazz
- Length: 42:47
- Label: MPS
- Producer: Hans Georg Brunner-Schwer

Oscar Peterson chronology
Reunion Blues (1972)	Great Connection (1974)	The Trio (1974)

Professional ratings
Review scores
Source	Rating
Allmusic	4/5 stars

Great Connection is a 1974 album by Oscar Peterson.

== Track listing ==
1. "Younger Than Springtime" (Oscar Hammerstein II, Richard Rodgers) – 5:24
2. "Where Do I Go from Here?" (Jerry Bock, Sheldon Harnick) – 5:53
3. "Smile" (Charlie Chaplin, John Turner, Geoffrey Parsons) – 3:59
4. "Soft Winds" (Fletcher Henderson, Fred Royal) – 6:44
5. "Just Squeeze Me (But Please Don't Tease Me)" (Duke Ellington, Lee Gaines) – 7:28
6. "On the Trail" (Harold Adamson, Ferde Grofé) – 5:51
7. "Wheatland" (Oscar Peterson) – 7:11

== Personnel ==
=== Performance ===
- Oscar Peterson – piano
- Niels-Henning Ørsted Pedersen – double bass
- Louis Hayes – drums
