= Virtuoso No. 2 =

Album by Joe Pass

Studio album by Joe Pass
- Released: 1976
- Recorded: September 14 & October 26, 1976
- Studio: RCA, Los Angeles
- Genre: Jazz
- Length: 58:16
- Label: Pablo
- Producer: Norman Granz

Joe Pass chronology
Joe Pass at the Montreux Jazz Festival 1975 (1975)	Virtuoso No. 2 (1976)	Fitzgerald and Pass... Again (1976)

Virtuoso No. 2 is an album by jazz guitarist Joe Pass, released in 1976.

== Reception ==
Professional ratings
Review scores
Source	Rating
AllMusic	4.5/5 stars
The Rolling Stone Jazz Record Guide	4/5 stars
The Penguin Guide to Jazz Recordings	3.5/4 stars

In his AllMusic review, critic Scott Yanow wrote "Pass' mastery of the guitar is obvious throughout this enjoyable set."

== Track listing ==
1. "Giant Steps" (John Coltrane) – 3:35
2. "Five Hundred Miles High" (Chick Corea) – 6:20
3. "Grooveyard" (Carl Perkins) – 4:46
4. "Misty" (Erroll Garner, Johnny Burke) – 5:25
5. "Joy Spring" (Clifford Brown, Jon Hendricks) – 5:10
6. "Blues for O.P." (Pass) – 4:21
7. "On Green Dolphin Street" (Bronisław Kaper, Ned Washington) - 7:43
8. "Windows" (Corea) – 5:56
9. "Blues for Basie" (Pass) – 3:39
10. "Feelings" (Louis Gasté, Morris Albert) – 3:58
11. "If" (David Gates) – 5:07
12. "Limehouse Blues" (Douglas Furber, Philip Braham) – 3:09

== Personnel ==
- Joe Pass – guitar

== Chart positions ==
Year	Chart	Position
1977	Billboard Jazz Albums	31
