= A Tribute to Oscar Peterson – Live at the Town Hall =

Live album by Oscar Peterson
- Released: 1997
- Recorded: October 1, 1996
- Genre: Jazz
- Length: 105:56
- Label: Telarc
- Producer: Robert Woods, Elaine Martone

Oscar Peterson chronology
Oscar in Paris (1996)	A Tribute to Oscar Peterson – Live at the Town Hall (1997)	Oscar and Benny (1998)

Professional ratings
Review scores
Source	Rating
Allmusic	3/5 stars
The Penguin Guide to Jazz Recordings	3/4 stars

A Tribute to Oscar Peterson – Live at the Town Hall is a 1997 live album by Oscar Peterson, and featuring various artists paying tribute to Peterson.

== Track listing ==
1. "Anything Goes" (Cole Porter) – 5:20
2. "Reunion Blues" (Milt Jackson) – 6:18
3. "If You Only Knew" (Oscar Peterson) – 8:06
4. "Bags' Groove" (Jackson) – 7:20
5. "Willow Weep for Me" (Ann Ronell) – 6:44
6. "Mumbles " (Clark Terry) – 4:00
7. "I Can't Face the Music" (Rube Bloom, Ted Koehler) – 3:39
8. "Here's to Life" (Artie Butler, Phyllis Molinary) – 5:05
9. "In a Mellow Tone" (Duke Ellington, Milt Gabler) – 5:18
10. "My Foolish Heart" (Ned Washington, Victor Young) – 5:15
11. "The Duke of Dubuque" (William Faber, James Marchant, Lawrence Royal) – 2:07
12. "(Get Your Kicks On) Route 66" (Bobby Troup) – 4:07
13. "Mack the Knife" (Marc Blitzstein, Bertolt Brecht, Kurt Weill) – 7:25

== Personnel ==
=== Performance ===
- Oscar Peterson – piano
- Benny Green – piano
- Shirley Horn – piano, vocal ("I Can't Face the Music", "Here's to Life")
- Stanley Turrentine – tenor saxophone
- Roy Hargrove – flugelhorn
- Clark Terry – trumpet, vocal
- The Manhattan Transfer – vocal
- Milt Jackson – vibraphone
- Herb Ellis – guitar
- Ray Brown – double bass
- Niels-Henning Ørsted Pedersen - double bass
- Lewis Nash – drums

=== Production ===
- Anilda Carrasquillo – art direction, design
- Edward Gajdel – photography
- Jack Renner – engineer
- Tom Young – mixing
- Robert Woods – producer, executive producer
- Elaine Martone – producer
- Bob Blumenthal – liner Notes
