= Oscar in Paris =

Live album by Oscar Peterson
- Released: 1997
- Recorded: June 25, 1996
- Genre: Jazz
- Length: 105:56
- Label: Telarc
- Producer: Robert Woods, Elaine Martone

Oscar Peterson chronology
Oscar Peterson Meets Roy Hargrove and Ralph Moore (1995)	Oscar in Paris (1997)	A Tribute to Oscar Peterson - Live at the Town Hall (1996)

Professional ratings
Review scores
Source	Rating
AllMusic	3/5 stars
The Penguin Guide to Jazz Recordings	3/4 stars

Oscar in Paris is a 1996 live album by Oscar Peterson, released in 1997.

== Track listing ==
1. "Falling in Love with Love" (Lorenz Hart, Richard Rodgers) – 9:17
2. "Nighttime" – 8:39
3. "Tranquille" – 9:30
4. "Smudge" – 8:47
5. "Love Ballade" – 10:31
6. "Sushi" – 8:44
7. "Kelly's Blues" – 7:08
8. "She Has Gone" – 8:08
9. "You Look Good to Me" (Seymour Lefco, Clement Wells) – 7:18
10. "Peace" – 8:35
11. "Sweet Georgia Brown" (Ben Bernie, Kenneth Casey, Maceo Pinkard) – 8:23
12. "Here's That Rainy Day"/"We Will Love Again" (Johnny Burke, Jimmy Van Heusen)/(Burke, Van Heusen) – 10:56

All tracks, unless otherwise noted, composed by Oscar Peterson.

== Personnel ==
Performance

- Oscar Peterson – piano
- Lorne Lofsky – guitar
- Niels-Henning Ørsted Pedersen – double bass
- Martin Drew – drums

Production

- Anilda Carrasquillo – art direction, design
- Mitchell Funk – photography
- Edward Gajdel
- Michael Hatch – technical assistance
- Steve Long
- Jack Renner – engineer
- Robert Woods – producer, executive producer
- Elaine Martone – producer
