= No Count Sarah =

Studio album by Sarah Vaughan
- Released: August 1959
- Recorded: August 6–8, 1957
- Studio: Fine Sound Studios, New York City
- Genre: Vocal jazz
- Length: 35:26
- Label: EmArcy
- Producer: Jack Tracy

Sarah Vaughan chronology
Sarah Vaughan Sings Broadway: Great Songs from Hit Shows (1958)	No Count Sarah (1959)	After Hours at the London House (1959)

Professional ratings
Review scores
Source	Rating
AllMusic	4.5/5 stars

No Count Sarah is a studio album by the American jazz singer Sarah Vaughan released in August 1959.

The title refers to the fact that Vaughan was accompanied by the Count Basie Orchestra, but without Count Basie. Reviewing the album for AllMusic, Scott Yanow gave it a four-and-a-half stars rating and called it "one of the best of all Sarah Vaughan recordings. Highly recommended". It features "astounding vocalese" from Vaughan on tracks including "Smoke Gets in Your Eyes" and "No 'Count Blues".

== Track listing ==
1. "Smoke Gets in Your Eyes" (Otto Harbach, Jerome Kern) – 3:58
2. "Doodlin'" (Horace Silver) – 4:34
3. "Darn That Dream" (Eddie DeLange, Jimmy Van Heusen) – 3:43
4. "Just One of Those Things" (Cole Porter) – 2:31
5. "Moonlight in Vermont" (John Blackburn, Karl Suessdorf) – 3:19
6. "No 'Count Blues" (Thad Jones, Sarah Vaughan) – 5:27
7. "Cheek to Cheek" (Irving Berlin) – 5:09
8. "Stardust" (Hoagy Carmichael, Mitchell Parish) – 3:17
9. "Missing You" (Ronnell Bright) – 3:28

== Personnel ==
- Sarah Vaughan - vocals

The Count Basie Orchestra

- Wendell Culley, Thad Jones, Snooky Young & Joe Newman - trumpet
- Henry Coker, Al Grey & Benny Powell - trombone
- Marshal Royal & Frank Wess - alto sax
- Frank Foster & Billy Mitchell - tenor sax
- Charlie Fowlkes - baritone sax
- Ronnell Bright - piano
- Freddie Green - guitar
- Richard Davis - double bass
- Sonny Payne - drums
- Johnny Mandel, Luther Henderson, Thad Jones & Frank Foster - arrangers
