= In Tune (album) =

Studio album by Oscar Peterson
- Released: 1971
- Recorded: July 1971
- Genre: Jazz, vocal jazz
- Length: 42:47
- Label: MPS
- Producer: Hans Georg Brunner-Schwer

Oscar Peterson chronology
| Tracks (1971) | In Tune (1971) | Reunion Blues (1972) |

Professional ratings
Review scores
| Source | Rating |
|---|---|
| Allmusic | 4/5 stars |

In Tune is a 1971 studio album by The Oscar Peterson Trio and The Singers Unlimited.

== Track listing ==
1. "Sesame Street" (Bruce Hart, Joe Raposo, Jon Stone) – 2:55
2. "It Never Entered My Mind" (Lorenz Hart, Richard Rodgers) – 4:03
3. "Children's Game" (Billy Blanco, Antonio Carlos Jobim) – 2:43
4. "The Gentle Rain" (Luiz Bonfá, Matt Dubey) – 3:24
5. "A Child Is Born" (Thad Jones) – 3:44
6. "The Shadow of Your Smile" (Johnny Mandel, Paul Francis Webster) – 4:32
7. "Catherine" (Patrick Williams) – 3:03
8. "Once Upon a Summertime" (Eddie Barclay, Michel Legrand, Eddy Marnay, Johnny Mercer) – 3:29
9. "Here's That Rainy Day" (Johnny Burke, Jimmy Van Heusen) – 4:40

== Personnel ==
=== Performance ===
- Oscar Peterson – piano
- Jiří Mráz – double bass
- Louis Hayes – drums
- The Singers Unlimited – Vocals
- Gene Puerling
- Len Dresslar
- Bonnie Herman
- Don Shelton
