= Last Call at the Blue Note =

Live album by Oscar Peterson
- Released: 1992
- Recorded: March 16–17, 1990
- Venue: The Blue Note, New York City
- Genre: Jazz
- Length: 61:18
- Label: Telarc
- Producer: Robert Woods

Oscar Peterson chronology
Saturday Night at the Blue Note (1991)	Last Call at the Blue Note (1992)	Encore at the Blue Note (1993)

Professional ratings
Review scores
Source	Rating
Allmusic	4/5 stars
The Penguin Guide to Jazz Recordings	3/4 stars

Last Call at the Blue Note is a 1992 live album by Oscar Peterson; it is the third CD of the Telarc 4-CD set. The performance includes three of Oscar Peterson's famous originals: "Blues Etude", "March Past" and "Wheatland".

== Track listing ==
1. "Jim" (Caesar Petrillo, Milton Samuels, Nelson Shawn) – 7:02
2. "Yours Is My Heart Alone" (Ludwig Herzer, Franz Lehár, Beda Fritz Loehner) – 11:38
3. Medley:"It Never Entered My Mind"/"Body and Soul" (Lorenz Hart, Richard Rodgers)/(Frank Eyton, Johnny Green, Edward Heyman, Robert Sour) – 9:12
4. "Wheatland" (Oscar Peterson) – 8:48
5. Medley: "Our Waltz"/"Adagio"/"Bach's Blues" (David Rose)/(Peterson)/(Peterson) – 9:54
6. "March Past" (Peterson) – 7:22
7. "Blues Etude" (Peterson) – 7:22

== Personnel ==
=== Performance ===
- Oscar Peterson – piano
- Bobby Durham – drums
- Ray Brown – double bass
- Herb Ellis - guitar

=== Production ===
- Donald Elfman - liner notes
- Kenneth Harmann - engineer
- Jack Renner
- Robert Woods - producer
