= Oscar Peterson Plays the Irving Berlin Songbook =

Studio album by Oscar Peterson
- Released: 1959
- Recorded: 1959
- Venue: Hollywood, Los Angeles
- Genre: Jazz
- Length: 31:46
- Label: Verve

Oscar Peterson chronology
Oscar Peterson Plays the Harry Warren Songbook (1959)	Oscar Peterson Plays the Irving Berlin Songbook (1959)	Oscar Peterson Plays the Harold Arlen Songbook (1959)

Oscar Peterson Plays the Irving Berlin Songbook is a 1959 album by Oscar Peterson of the music of Irving Berlin.

Billboard magazine chose the album as one of its Special Merit Spotlights in their January 18, 1960 issue. Billboard described the album as "inventive and listenable thruout".

== Reception ==
Professional ratings
Review scores
Source	Rating
Allmusic	3/5 stars
DownBeat	3/5 stars

Scott Yanow reviewed the album for Allmusic and wrote that due to Peterson and his trio recording nine albums in a month, " ... not much planning went into the individual songs" and that the subsequent interpretations were "fairly melodic and safe, if swinging. Nothing unexpected occurs, but the music is reasonably pleasing, if lacking in emotional depth". Yanow also noted that the album contained "one of the happier versions ... yet recorded" of Berlin's "Supper Time", a song about a lynching.

== Track listing ==
1. "I've Got My Love to Keep Me Warm" – 2:37
2. "Supper Time" – 3:11
3. "I'm Putting All My Eggs in One Basket" – 2:01
4. "Change Partners" – 2:25
5. "The Song Is Ended" – 2:58
6. "How Deep Is the Ocean" – 2:59
7. "Cheek to Cheek" – 2:28
8. "I Used to Be Color Blind" – 2:18
9. "You're Laughing at Me" – 2:21
10. "Isn't This a Lovely Day?" – 3:21
11. "Top Hat, White Tie and Tails" – 2:16
12. "Remember" – 2:51

== Personnel ==
- Oscar Peterson - piano
- Ray Brown - double bass
- Ed Thigpen drums
