= Live at the North Sea Jazz Festival, 1980 (Oscar Peterson album) =

Live album by Oscar Peterson
- Released: 1980
- Recorded: July 13, 1980
- Genre: Jazz
- Length: 77:36
- Label: Pablo
- Producer: Norman Granz

Oscar Peterson chronology
The Personal Touch (1980)	Live at the North Sea Jazz Festival, 1980 (1980)	A Royal Wedding Suite (1981)

Professional ratings
Review scores
Source	Rating
Allmusic	4.5/5 stars
The Rolling Stone Jazz Record Guide	3/5 stars
The Penguin Guide to Jazz Recordings	3/4 stars

Live at the North Sea Jazz Festival, 1980 is a 1980 album by Oscar Peterson, accompanied by Joe Pass, Toots Thielemans and Niels-Henning Ørsted Pedersen.

== Track listing ==
1. "Caravan" (Duke Ellington, Irving Mills, Juan Tizol) – 11:21
2. "Straight, No Chaser" (Thelonious Monk) – 8:54
3. "There's No You" (Tom Adair, Hal Hopper) – 6:35
4. "You Stepped Out of a Dream" (Nacio Herb Brown, Gus Kahn) – 7:19
5. "City Lights" (Oscar Peterson) – 6:36
6. "I'm Old Fashioned" (Jerome Kern, Johnny Mercer) – 6:10
7. "A Time for Love" (Johnny Mandel, Paul Francis Webster) – 7:17
8. "Bluesology" (Milt Jackson) – 6:57
9. "Goodbye" (Gordon Jenkins) – 8:13
10. "There Is No Greater Love" (Isham Jones, Marty Symes) – 8:14

== Personnel ==
=== Performance ===
- Oscar Peterson – piano
- Toots Thielemans – harmonica
- Niels-Henning Ørsted Pedersen – double bass
- Joe Pass – guitar
