= After Hours at the London House =

Live album by Sarah Vaughan
- Released: 1959
- Recorded: March 7, 1958
- Venue: The London House, Chicago
- Genre: Vocal jazz
- Length: 38:04
- Label: Mercury
- Producers: David Carroll, Jack Tracy

Sarah Vaughan chronology
No Count Sarah (1958)	After Hours at the London House (1959)	Vaughan and Violins (1959)

Professional ratings
Review scores
Source	Rating
Allmusic	3/5 stars

After Hours at the London House is a 1959 live album by American jazz singer Sarah Vaughan, recorded at The London House, Chicago.

== Track listing ==
1. "Like Someone in Love" (Johnny Burke, Jimmy Van Heusen) – 3:37
2. "Detour Ahead" (Lou Carter, Herb Ellis, John Frigo) – 5:28
3. "Three Little Words" (Bert Kalmar, Harry Ruby) – 3:40
4. "I'll String Along with You" (Al Dubin, Harry Warren) – 5:15
5. "You'd Be So Nice to Come Home To" (Cole Porter) – 4:00
6. "Speak Low" (Ogden Nash, Kurt Weill) – 4:51
7. "All of You" (Porter) – 4:15
8. "Thanks for the Memory" (Ralph Rainger, Leo Robin) – 6:58

== Personnel ==
- Sarah Vaughan – vocals
- Ronnell Bright – piano
- Richard Davis – double bass
- Roy Haynes – drums
- Thad Jones – trumpet
- Wendell Culley - trumpet
- Henry Coker – trombone
- Frank Wess – tenor saxophone
- Carmen Cavallaro – introduction voice

Technical

- Malcolm Chisholm - recording engineer
- Emmett McBain - design
- Hollis King - art direction
- Don Bronstein - cover photography
