= The Good Life (Oscar Peterson album) =

Live album by Oscar Peterson
- Released: 1974
- Recorded: May 16–19, 1973
- Genre: Jazz
- Length: 44:48
- Label: Pablo
- Producer: Norman Granz

Oscar Peterson chronology
The Trio (1974)	The Good Life (1974)	The History of an Artist, Vol. 1 (1974)

Joe Pass chronology
Two for the Road (1974)	The Good Life (1974)	Portraits of Duke Ellington (1974)

Professional ratings
Review scores
Source	Rating
Allmusic	4/5 stars
The Penguin Guide to Jazz Recordings	3/4 stars

The Good Life is a 1974 live album by Oscar Peterson, accompanied by Joe Pass and Niels-Henning Ørsted Pedersen.

== Track listing ==
1. "Wheatland" (Oscar Peterson) – 12:17
2. "Wave" (Antonio Carlos Jobim) – 10:46
3. "For Count" (Peterson) – 6:49
4. "The Good Life" (Sacha Distel, Jack Reardon) – 7:12
5. "On a Clear Day (You Can See Forever)" (Burton Lane, Alan Jay Lerner) – 7:44

== Personnel ==
- Oscar Peterson – piano
- Joe Pass – guitar
- Niels-Henning Ørsted Pedersen – double bass
