= The Trio (Oscar Peterson album) =

Live album by Oscar Peterson
- Released: 1961
- Recorded: July 28–29, 1961
- Venues: The London House, Chicago
- Genre: Jazz
- Length: 76:03
- Label: Verve
- Producer: Norman Granz

Oscar Peterson chronology
Fiorello! (1960)	The Trio (1961)	The Sound of the Trio (1962)

Professional ratings
Review scores
Source	Rating
AllMusic	4/5 stars
DownBeat	4.5/5 stars
The Penguin Guide to Jazz Recordings	3/4 stars

The Trio (alternatively titled The Trio: Live From Chicago) is a 1961 live album by the Oscar Peterson Trio, recorded at the London House jazz club in Chicago, during a period in which the pianist "was generally in peak form."

Three other Oscar Peterson Trio albums were also released featuring music from the London House concerts: The Sound of the Trio, Something Warm and Put On a Happy Face. The complete sessions were released in 1996 as The London House Sessions.

== Track listing ==
Side one

1. "I've Never Been in Love Before" (Frank Loesser) – 5:35
2. "In the Wee Small Hours of the Morning" (Bob Hilliard, David Mann) – 8:07
3. "Chicago" (Fred Fisher) – 8:55

Side two

1. "The Night We Called It a Day" (Tom Adair, Matt Dennis) – 4:47
2. "Sometimes I'm Happy" (Irving Caesar, Clifford Grey, Vincent Youmans) – 11:41
3. "Whisper Not" (Benny Golson) – 5:46
4. "Billy Boy" (Traditional) – 1:46

1997 CD reissue bonus tracks

8. "The Lonesome One" (Oscar Peterson) – 5:32
9. "The Gravy Waltz" (Steve Allen, Ray Brown) – 4:54
10. "Woody 'n' You" (Dizzy Gillespie) – 3:48
11. "Soon" (George Gershwin, Ira Gershwin) – 9:20
12. "Daahoud" (Clifford Brown) – 5:52

Recorded July 28 (#1–3, 7) and July 29 (#4–6, 8–12), 1961 at the London House, Chicago.

== Personnel ==
- Oscar Peterson – piano
- Ray Brown – double bass
- Ed Thigpen – drums

== See also ==
- The Sound of the Trio (1962)
- Put On a Happy Face (album) (1966)
- Something Warm (1967)
- The London House Sessions (1996)
