= Seven, Come Eleven =

Live album by Herb Ellis and Joe Pass
- Released: 1974
- Recorded: July 29, 1973
- Venue: Concord Boulevard Park, Concord, California
- Genre: Jazz
- Length: 38:40
- Label: Concord Jazz
- Producer: Carl Jefferson

Joe Pass chronology
Live at Donte's (1973)	Seven, Come Eleven (1974)	Portraits of Duke Ellington (1975)

Seven, Come Eleven is a live album by jazz guitarists Herb Ellis and Joe Pass that was released in 1974.

== Reception ==
Professional ratings
Review scores
Source	Rating
Allmusic	4/5 stars
The Rolling Stone Jazz Record Guide	3/5 stars

In his Allmusic review, critic Scott Yanow wrote "Although Pass would soon be recognized as a giant, Ellis battles him to a draw on this frequently exciting bop-oriented date..."

== Track listing ==
1. "In a Mellow Tone" (Duke Ellington, Milt Gabler) – 7:32
2. "Seven Come Eleven" (Charlie Christian, Benny Goodman) – 5:09
3. "Prelude to a Kiss" (Duke Ellington, Irving Mills, Mack Gordon) – 5:34
4. "Perdido" (Juan Tizol, Ervin Drake, H. J. Lengsfelder) – 4:51
5. "(I'm) Confessin' (That I Love You)" (Doc Daugherty, Al Neiburg, Ellis Reynolds) – 5:12
6. "Easy Living" (Ralph Rainger, Leo Robin) – 4:32
7. "Concord Blues" (Herb Ellis, Joe Pass) – 8:49

== Personnel ==
- Herb Ellis – guitar
- Joe Pass – guitar
- Ray Brown – bass
- Jake Hanna – drums
