= Oscar Peterson Jam – Montreux '77 =

Oscar Peterson Jam - Montreux '77

Live album by Oscar Peterson
- Released: 1977
- Recorded: July 14, 1977
- Genre: Jazz
- Length: 50:15
- Label: Pablo
- Producer: Norman Granz

Oscar Peterson chronology
Porgy and Bess (1976)	Oscar Peterson Jam - Montreux '77 (1977)	Oscar Peterson and the Bassists - Montreux '77 (1977)

Professional ratings
Review scores
Source	Rating
Allmusic	4/5 stars
The Rolling Stone Jazz Record Guide	2/5 stars
The Penguin Guide to Jazz Recordings	3/4 stars

Oscar Peterson Jam – Montreux '77 is a 1977 live album featuring a jam session led by Oscar Peterson. At the Grammy Awards of 1979, Peterson won the Grammy Award for Best Jazz Performance by a Soloist for his performance on this album.

== Track listing ==
1. "Ali and Frazier" (Oscar Peterson) – 9:20
2. "If I Were a Bell" (Frank Loesser) – 10:39
3. "Things Ain't What They Used to Be" (Mercer Ellington, Ted Persons) – 12:42
4. "Just in Time" (Betty Comden, Adolph Green, Jule Styne) – 9:49
5. "Bye Bye Blues" (David Bennett, Chauncey Gray, Frederick Hamm, Bert Lown) – 8:06

== Personnel ==
Recorded July 14, 1977 at the Montreux Jazz Festival, Montreux, Switzerland:

=== Performance ===
- Oscar Peterson - piano
- Eddie "Lockjaw" Davis - tenor saxophone
- Dizzy Gillespie - trumpet
- Clark Terry - trumpet
- Niels-Henning Ørsted Pedersen - double bass
- Bobby Durham - drums

=== Production ===
- Norman Granz - producer
- Giuseppe Pino - photography
- Phil DeLancie - remastering
