= The Sound of the Trio =

Live album by Oscar Peterson
- Released: 1962
- Recorded: July 28–29, 1961
- Genre: Jazz
- Length: 76:03
- Label: Verve
- Producer: Norman Granz

Oscar Peterson chronology
The Trio (1962)	The Sound of the Trio (1962)	Very Tall (1962)

Professional ratings
Review scores
Source	Rating
AllMusic	3/5 stars
The Penguin Guide to Jazz Recordings	3/4 stars
The Rolling Stone Jazz Record Guide	3/5 stars

The Sound of the Trio is a 1962 live album by the Oscar Peterson Trio, recorded in 1961 at the London House jazz club in Chicago.

Three other Oscar Peterson Trio albums were also released featuring music from the London House concerts: The Trio, Something Warm, and Put On a Happy Face. The complete sessions were released in 1996 as The London House Sessions.

== Track listing ==
Side one

1. "Tricrotism" (Originally Tricotism) (Oscar Pettiford) – 11:10
2. "On Green Dolphin Street" (Bronislaw Kaper, Ned Washington) – 8:55

Side two

1. "Thag's Dance" (Oscar Peterson) – 5:43
2. "Ill Wind" (Harold Arlen, Ted Koehler) – 5:36
3. "Kadota's Blues" (Peterson) – 11:15

2000 CD reissue bonus tracks

6. "Scrapple from the Apple" (Charlie Parker) – 9:29
7. "Jim" (Caesar Petrillo, Milton Samuels, Nelson Shawn) – 9:13
8. "Band Call (Duke Ellington) – 7:47
9. "The Night We Called It a Day" (Tom Adair, Matt Dennis) – 5:08
10. "Billy Boy" (Traditional) – 2:35

== Personnel ==
- Oscar Peterson - piano
- Ray Brown - double bass
- Ed Thigpen - drums
