= Solo (Oscar Peterson album) =

Live album by Oscar Peterson
- Released: October 1, 2002
- Recorded: August 17 and November 4, 1972
- Genre: Jazz
- Label: Pablo
- Producer: Norman Granz, Eric Miller (Compilation producer)

Oscar Peterson chronology
The Tenor Giants Featuring Oscar Peterson (2001)	Solo (2002)	A Night in Vienna (2004)

Professional ratings
Review scores
Source	Rating
All About Jazz	favorable
AllMusic	4/5 stars
The Penguin Guide to Jazz	3/4 stars

Solo is an album by jazz pianist Oscar Peterson, recorded in concert in 1972 and released in 2002.

== Track listing ==
1. "Yesterdays" (Otto Harbach, Jerome Kern) – 3:44
2. "Makin' Whoopee" (Walter Donaldson, Gus Kahn) – 3:57
3. "Who Can I Turn To (When Nobody Needs Me)" (Leslie Bricusse, Anthony Newley) – 4:45
4. "Take the "A" Train" (Billy Strayhorn) – 3:11
5. "Body and Soul" (Edward Heyman, Robert Sour, Frank Eyton, Johnny Green) – 4:38
6. "Blues of the Prairies" (Oscar Peterson) – 5:03
7. "Corcovado" (Antonio Carlos Jobim) – 4:26
8. "Blues Etude" (Peterson) – 5:11
9. "Autumn Leaves" (Joseph Kosma, Johnny Mercer, Jacques Prévert) – 4:24
10. "Here's That Rainy Day" (Johnny Burke, Jimmy Van Heusen) – 5:59
11. "Sweet Georgia Brown" (Ben Bernie, Maceo Pinkard, Kenneth Casey) – 4:32
12. "Satin Doll" (Duke Ellington, Mercer, Strayhorn) – 5:41
13. "Mirage" (Peterson) – 6:16
14. "Hogtown Blues" (Peterson) – 5:44

== Personnel ==
- Oscar Peterson – piano
