= An Oscar Peterson Christmas =

Studio album by Oscar Peterson
- Released: 1995
- Recorded: January 15–16, May 23–24, June 23, July 30, 1995
- Genres: Jazz; Christmas music
- Length: 61:01
- Label: Telarc
- Producers: Elaine Martone, Robert Woods

Oscar Peterson chronology
The More I See You (1995)	An Oscar Peterson Christmas (1995)	Oscar Peterson Meets Roy Hargrove and Ralph Moore (1996)

Professional ratings
Review scores
Source	Rating
Allmusic	2.5/5 stars
The Penguin Guide to Jazz Recordings	3/4 stars

An Oscar Peterson Christmas is a 1995 album by Oscar Peterson.

== Track listing ==
1. "God Rest Ye Merry, Gentlemen" (Traditional) – 3:24
2. "What Child Is This?" (William Chatterton Dix, Traditional) – 4:47
3. "Let It Snow! Let It Snow! Let It Snow!" (Sammy Cahn, Jule Styne) – 3:39
4. "White Christmas" (Irving Berlin) – 3:48
5. "Jingle Bells" (James Pierpont) – 3:12
6. "I'll Be Home for Christmas" (Buck Ram, Kim Gannon, Walter Kent) – 2:46
7. "Santa Claus Is Coming to Town" (J. Fred Coots, Haven Gillespie) – 3:28
8. "O Little Town of Bethlehem" (Phillips Brooks, Lewis Redner) – 3:16
9. "The Christmas Waltz" (Cahn, Styne) – 6:50
10. "Have Yourself a Merry Little Christmas" (Ralph Blane, Hugh Martin) – 3:55
11. "Silent Night" (Franz Gruber, Josef Mohr) – 3:07
12. "Winter Wonderland" (Richard B. Smith, Felix Bernard) – 4:06
13. "Away in a Manger" (Traditional) – 3:33
14. "O Christmas Tree" (Traditional) – 2:19

== Personnel ==
- Oscar Peterson – piano
- Dave Samuels – vibraphone (3, 4, 7, 10, 12)
- Jack Schantz – flugelhorn (5, 6, 13)
- Lorne Lofsky – guitar
- David Young – double bass
- Jerry Fuller – drums
- String orchestra conducted and arranged by Rick Wilkins
