= Blues Etude =

Studio album by Oscar Peterson
- Released: 1966
- Recorded: December 3, 1965 and May 4, 1966
- Studios: Chicago Sound Studios, Chicago, IL
- Genre: Jazz
- Length: 42:11
- Label: Limelight
- Producer: Richard S. Sherman

Oscar Peterson chronology
Put On a Happy Face (1966)	Blues Etude (1966)	Something Warm (1967)

Professional ratings
Review scores
Source	Rating
Allmusic	4/5 stars

Blues Etude is a 1966 album by Oscar Peterson. It was the trio's last recording to feature bassist Ray Brown.

== Track listing ==
1. "Blues Etude" (Oscar Peterson) – 3:53
2. "Shelley's World" (Bill Traut) – 5:20
3. "Let's Fall in Love" (Harold Arlen, Ted Koehler) – 3:49
4. "The Shadow of Your Smile" (Johnny Mandel, Paul Francis Webster) – 4:39
5. "If I Were a Bell" (Frank Loesser) – 5:19
6. "Stella by Starlight" (Ned Washington, Victor Young) – 5:17
7. "Bossa Beguine" (Peterson) – 3:49
8. "L' Impossible" (Peterson) – 5:00
9. "I Know You Oh So Well" (Peterson) – 5:05

== Personnel ==
- Oscar Peterson – piano
- Ray Brown – double bass (tracks 5–9)
- Sam Jones – double bass (tracks 1–4)
- Louis Hayes – drums
