= Digital at Montreux =

Live album by Oscar Peterson
- Released: 1979
- Recorded: July 16, 1979
- Genre: Jazz
- Length: 38:35
- Label: Pablo
- Producer: Norman Granz

Oscar Peterson chronology
Skol (1979)	Digital at Montreux (1979)	The Personal Touch (1980)

Professional ratings
Review scores
Source	Rating
Allmusic	3/5 stars
The Rolling Stone Jazz Record Guide	2/5 stars
The Penguin Guide to Jazz Recordings	3.5/4 stars

Digital at Montreux is a 1979 live album by Oscar Peterson, accompanied by Niels-Henning Ørsted Pedersen, recorded at the 1979 Montreux Jazz Festival.

== Track listing ==
1. "Old Folks" (Dedette Lee Hill, Willard Robison) – 5:29
2. "Soft Winds" (Benny Goodman, Fletcher Henderson) – 5:43
3. "(Back Home Again In) Indiana" (James F. Hanley, Ballard MacDonald) – 5:09
4. "That's All" (Alan Brandt, Bob Haymes) – 3:02
5. "Younger Than Springtime" (Oscar Hammerstein II, Richard Rodgers) – 4:45
6. Duke Ellington Medley: "Caravan"/"Rockin' in Rhythm"/"C Jam Blues"/"(In My) Solitude"/"Satin Doll"/"Caravan" (reprise) (Juan Tizol, Duke Ellington)/(Harry Carney, Ellington, Irving Mills)/(Ellington)/(Ellington, Eddie DeLange)/(Ellington, Johnny Mercer, Billy Strayhorn) – 7:36
7. "On the Trail" (Harold Adamson, Ferde Grofé) – 8:51

== Personnel ==
=== Performance ===
- Oscar Peterson – piano
- Niels-Henning Ørsted Pedersen – double bass
