= Toni Harper =

American jazz musician (1937–2023)

- Born: June 8, 1937; Los Angeles, California
- Died: February 10, 2023 (aged 85); Palm Springs, California
- Occupations: Singer, actress
- Parents: Fifi Harper (mother); Henry Harper (father)

Toni Harper (June 8, 1937 – February 10, 2023) later Toni Dunlap, was an American former child singer and actress.

== Early life and career ==
Toni Harper was born in Los Angeles, California on June 8, 1937 to Fifi and Henry Harper. She began singing dancing, acting, and singing from the age of 4, singing songs such as "Miss In-Between Blues", "Three Blind Mice", "The Muffin Man", and "Swing Low, Sweet Chariot". Those who heard her perform compared her vocal control and technique similar to that of Ella Fitzgerald and Sarah Vaughan.

After learning dance under the direction of a family friend Maceo Anderson, Harper was cast by choreographer Nick Castle in Christmas Follies at the Wilshire Ebell Theatre in 1945. She later went on to perform on stage with Herb Jeffries and Cab Calloway.

Harper performed at the third annual Cavalcade of Jazz concert at Wrigley Field in Los Angeles on September 7, 1947. Other performers included Woody Herman, The Valdez Orchestra, The Blenders, T-Bone Walker, Slim Gaillard, The Honeydrippers, Sarah Vaughan and the Three Blazers. Harper also performed at the eighth Cavalcade of Jazz concert on June 1, 1952. Other performers included Roy Brown and His Mighty Men, Anna Mae Winburn and Her Sweethearts, Jerry Wallace, Louis Jordan, Jimmy Witherspoon, and Josephine Baker.

In 1946, Harper recorded "Candy Store Blues", a song about a girl who loves sweets, which became a hit that year and earned a platinum record. Harper appeared twice on Toast of the Town (later known as The Ed Sullivan Show) in 1949, making her third and final appearance on the show in 1950.

On June 11, 1949, Harper was the featured performer in a revue at Carnegie Hall.

In 1954, Harper became an in-demand singer, singing songs such as "Play Me The Blues" and "Taking a Chance on Love" with Dizzy Gillespie and his orchestra.

After success as a child singer, Harper signed with record label Verve Records and recorded her first album Toni in 1955, with the Oscar Peterson Quartet. She made two additional albums, arranged by Marty Paich, Lady Lonely (1959) and Night Mood (1960).

In 1959, as written in an issue in Jet magazine, Harper performed with the Count Basie Orchestra, marking the first performance by a female singer in nearly seven years.

Afterwards, Harper toured Japan with Cannonball Adderley's band in 1963, singing "One Note Samba". She also appeared in the film How to Stuff a Wild Bikini (1965), playing the role of Barbarette. She eventually retired from acting and singing in 1966, becoming an assistant director of budgets for the U.S. Postal Service in the Los Angeles area. She made a brief comeback in her 80's, appearing in the virtual reality video game Second Life.

== Personal life and death ==
Her husband was Ron Dunlap. Harper died on February 10, 2023 at the age of 85 near her home in Palm Springs, California.

== Discography ==
Albums

- 1956 Toni (Verve, with the Oscar Peterson Quartet)
- 1959 Lady Lonely (RCA Victor, with Marty Paich & Orchestra)
- 1960 Night Mood (RCA Victor, with Marty Paich & Orchestra)

=== Compilations ===
- 1957 Here Come The Girls!
- 1988 Candy Store Blues: The Singles & Albums Collection 1948-60
- 2014 Lost Voice (CD)

Singles

With Herb Jeffries

- "You're Too Tall 'n' I'm Too Small" (1949, Columbia)
- "Peppermint Stick" (1949, Columbia)

With Dizzy Gillespie

- Jazz Recital (Norgran, 1955)

With Harry James

- "Baby Blues" and "Peculiar Kind Of Feeling" (Columbia 39390, 1951)
- "Blacksmith Blues" and "Don't Send Me Home" (Columbia 39671, 1952)
- "Melancholy Trumpet" (Columbia 39846, 1952)
- "Fruit Cake" (Columbia 39877, 1952)
- "Never Trust a Stranger" / "As Time Goes By" (1965)

== Film and television credits ==
- How To Stuff a Wild Bikini (1965) - Barbarette
- Hollywood A-Go Go (TV series, June 1965, episode 25, performer: "Never Trust a Stranger")
- Ed Sullivan Show - Self (season 2 episode 40, season 2 episode 43, season 3 episode 43, singer)
- Shivaree (TV series, episode "Toni Harper, The Temptations, and Steve Alaimo, 1965) (singer)
- Stars of Jazz (TV series, season 2 episode 7, singer)
- This is Show Business (TV series, season 3 episode 18, singer)
- The Frank Sinatra Show (TV series, season 1 episode 12, singer)
- The Milton Berle Show (TV series, season 3 episode 14, singer)
- We The People (TV series, season 1 episode 55, singer)
- Sunday Best: The Untold Story of Ed Sullivan (2025 documentary, self, singer, archive footage)
- Grave Mistake (2008) - Farmer's Daughter
- Make Believe Ballroom (1949) - self (singer)
- Manhattan Angel (1949) - Toni
