= Oscar Peterson and Harry Edison =

Studio album by Oscar Peterson
- Released: 1975
- Recorded: December 21, 1974
- Genre: Jazz
- Length: 54:22
- Label: Pablo
- Producer: Norman Granz

Oscar Peterson chronology
Oscar Peterson and Roy Eldridge (1974)	Oscar Peterson and Harry Edison (1975)	Oscar Peterson et Joe Pass à Salle Pleyel (1975)

Professional ratings
Review scores
Source	Rating
AllMusic	4.5/5 stars
The Penguin Guide to Jazz Recordings	3.5/4 stars

Oscar Peterson and Harry Edison is a 1975 album by Oscar Peterson, accompanied by Harry "Sweets" Edison.

== Track listing ==
1. "Easy Living" (Ralph Rainger, Leo Robin) – 6:10
2. "Days of Wine and Roses" (Henry Mancini, Johnny Mercer) – 4:51
3. "Gee Baby, Ain't I Good to You" (Andy Razaf, Don Redman) – 6:03
4. "Basie" (Harry "Sweets" Edison, Oscar Peterson) – 7:22
5. "Mean to Me" (Fred E. Ahlert, Roy Turk) – 6:32
6. "Signify" (Edison, Peterson) – 5:05
7. "Willow Weep for Me" (Ann Ronell) – 4:36
8. "The Man I Love" (George Gershwin, Ira Gershwin) – 4:33
9. "You Go to My Head" (J. Fred Coots, Dizzy Gillespie) – 5:27

== Personnel ==
- Harry "Sweets" Edison – trumpet
- Oscar Peterson – piano
