= Something Warm =

Live album by the Oscar Peterson Trio
- Released: 1967
- Recorded: July 28–29, 1961
- Genre: Jazz
- Label: Verve
- Producer: Norman Granz

The Oscar Peterson Trio chronology
Blues Etude (1966)	Something Warm (1967)	Soul Español (1967)

Professional ratings
Review scores
Source	Rating
AllMusic	3/5 stars
The Rolling Stone Jazz Record Guide	3/5 stars

Something Warm is a live album by the Oscar Peterson Trio, recorded at the London House jazz club in Chicago. The sessions were in 1961, but the album was initially released as Verve V/V6-8681 in 1967.

Three other Oscar Peterson Trio albums were also released featuring music from the London House concerts: The Trio, The Sound of the Trio, and Put On a Happy Face. The complete sessions were released in 1996 as The London House Sessions.

== Track listing ==
Side one

1. "There Is No Greater Love" (Isham Jones, Marty Symes)
2. "I Remember Clifford" (Benny Golson)
3. "Autumn Leaves" (Jacques Prévert, Joseph Kosma, Johnny Mercer)

Side two

1. "Blues for Big Scotia" (Oscar Peterson)
2. "Swamp Fire" (Harold Mooney)
3. "I Love You" (Cole Porter)

== Personnel ==
- Oscar Peterson – piano
- Ray Brown – double bass
- Ed Thigpen – drums

== Chart positions ==
Year	Chart	Position
1967	Billboard Jazz Albums	16
