= Tracks (Oscar Peterson album) =

Studio album by Oscar Peterson
- Released: 1971
- Recorded: November 10–13, 1970
- Studio: Hans Georg Brunner-Schwer Studio, Villingen-Schwenningen, West Germany
- Genre: Jazz
- Length: 42:02
- Label: MPS
- Producer: Matthias Kunnecke

Oscar Peterson chronology
Another Day (1971)	Tracks (1971)	In Tune (1971)

Professional ratings
Review scores
Source	Rating
AllMusic	4.5/5 stars
The Penguin Guide to Jazz Recordings	3/4 stars
The Rolling Stone Jazz Record Guide	4/5 stars

Tracks is a 1971 album by Oscar Peterson.

== Track listing ==
1. "Give Me the Simple Life" (Rube Bloom, Harry Ruby) – 3:59
2. "Basin Street Blues" (Spencer Williams) – 4:14
3. "Honeysuckle Rose" (Andy Razaf, Fats Waller) – 3:05
4. "Dancing on the Ceiling" (Lorenz Hart, Richard Rodgers) – 5:07
5. "A Child Is Born" (Thad Jones) – 2:35
6. "If I Should Lose You" (Ralph Rainger, Leo Robin) – 5:19
7. "A Little Jazz Exercise" (Oscar Peterson) – 2:43
8. "Django" (John Lewis) – 5:16
9. "Ja-Da" (Bob Carleton) – 4:17
10. "Just a Gigolo" (Julius Brammer, Irving Caesar, Leonello Casucci) – 5:27

== Analysis ==
1. "Give Me the Simple Life" starts the album with a [block chord] technique.
2. "Basin Street Blues" is a slow stride addition to the album
3. "Honeysuckle Rose" utilizes an up-tempo rendition of the original song
4. "Dancing on the Ceiling" is the second slow-stride addition to the album,
5. "A Child Is Born" is a slow ballade-style setting, stating the melody, then improvising slightly on that melody.
6. If I Should Lose You" the improvisation is approached in a similar way to Basin Street Blues
7. "A Little Jazz Exercise" is the only original composition by Oscar Peterson. It is based on the standard "I Want to Be Happy" (Irving Caesar/Vincent Youmans) chord changes.
8. "Django" begins very close to the original version, and veers off into a Db improvisation
9. "Ja-Da" continues the slow stride technique started by track #1, 4, & 6
10. "Just a Gigolo another slow stride interpretation.

== Personnel ==
Performance

- Oscar Peterson - piano

Production

- Willi Fruth - recording director
- Stefan Kassel - artwork, series design
- Matthias Kunnecke - producer
- Gene Lees - liner notes
- Richard Palmer
- Willem Makkee - digital remastering
- Hubertus Mall - artwork, cover illustration
