= Joe Pass at the Montreux Jazz Festival 1975 =

Live album by Joe Pass
- Released: 1975
- Recorded: July 17–18, 1975
- Venue: Montreux Jazz Festival
- Genre: Jazz
- Length: 42:33 (Reissue)
- Label: Pablo
- Producer: Norman Granz

Joe Pass chronology
Portraits of Duke Ellington (1975)	Joe Pass at the Montreux Jazz Festival 1975 (1975)	Virtuoso No. 2 (1976)

Professional ratings
Review scores
Source	Rating
AllMusic	4.5/5 stars
The Penguin Guide to Jazz Recordings	3/4 stars

Joe Pass at the Montreux Jazz Festival 1975 is a live album by jazz guitarist Joe Pass that was released in 1975. It was recorded at the Montreux Jazz Festival in 1975.

== Track listing ==
1. "You Are the Sunshine of My Life" (Stevie Wonder) – 5:12
2. "The Very Thought of You" (Ray Noble) – 3:22
3. "Nobs" (Joe Pass) – 4:07
4. "Li'l Darlin'" (Neal Hefti) – 3:15
5. "Blues for Nina" (Pass) – 2:51
6. "How Long Has This Been Going On?" (George Gershwin, Ira Gershwin) – 4:24
7. "More Than You Know" (Edward Eliscu, Billy Rose, Vincent Youmans) – 4:03
8. "Grete" (Pass) – 3:32
9. "Nuages" (Jacques Larue, Django Reinhardt) – 3:39
10. "I'm Glad There Is You" (Jimmy Dorsey, Paul Mertz) – 4:03
11. "Willow Weep for Me" (Ann Ronell) – 4:05

== Personnel ==
- Joe Pass – guitar
