= Live at the Blue Note (Oscar Peterson album) =

Live album by Oscar Peterson
- Released: 1990
- Recorded: March 16, 1990
- Venue: The Blue Note, New York City
- Genre: Jazz
- Length: 67:00
- Label: Telarc
- Producer: Robert Woods

Oscar Peterson chronology
Benny Carter Meets Oscar Peterson (1986)	Live at the Blue Note (1990)	Saturday Night at the Blue Note (1991)

Professional ratings
Review scores
Source	Rating
Allmusic	4.5/5 stars
The Penguin Guide to Jazz Recordings	3.5/4 stars

Live at the Blue Note is a 1990 live album by Oscar Peterson.

== Track listing ==
1. Introductions – 1:56
2. "Honeysuckle Rose" (Andy Razaf, Fats Waller) – 8:50
3. "Let There Be Love" (Lionel Rand, Ian Grant) – 12:00
4. "Peace for South Africa" (Oscar Peterson) – 10:46
5. "Sushi" (Peterson) – 8:06
6. "I Remember You"/"A Child Is Born"/"Tenderly" (Johnny Mercer, Victor Schertzinger)/(Thad Jones, Alec Wilder)/(Walter Gross, Jack Lawrence) – 7:17
7. "Sweet Georgia Brown" (Ben Bernie, Maceo Pinkard, Kenneth Casey) – 8:21
8. "Blues for Big Scotia" (Peterson) - 6:08

== Personnel ==
=== Performance ===
- Oscar Peterson – piano
- Herb Ellis – guitar
- Ray Brown – double bass
- Bobby Durham - drums

=== Production ===
- Ray Kirschensteiner - art direction
- Leonard Feather - liner notes
- Kenneth Harmann - engineer
- Jack Renner
- Robert Woods - producer
