= Oscar Peterson and the Bassists – Montreux '77 =

Oscar Peterson and the Bassists - Montreux '77

Live album by Oscar Peterson
- Released: 1977
- Recorded: 1977
- Genre: Jazz
- Length: 54:44
- Label: Pablo
- Producer: Norman Granz

Oscar Peterson chronology
Oscar Peterson Jam – Montreux '77 (1977)	Oscar Peterson and the Bassists - Montreux '77 (1977)	Satch and Josh...Again (1977)

Professional ratings
Review scores
Source	Rating
AllMusic	4/5 stars
The Rolling Stone Jazz Record Guide	2/5 stars
The Penguin Guide to Jazz Recordings	3/4 stars

Oscar Peterson and the Bassists – Montreux '77 is a 1977 live album by Oscar Peterson.

== Track listing ==
1. "There Is No Greater Love" (Marty Symes, Isham Jones) – 6:18
2. "You Look Good to Me" (Seymour Lefco, Clement Wells) – 7:02
3. "People" (Bob Merrill, Jule Styne) – 6:31
4. "Reunion Blues" (Milt Jackson) – 6:45
5. "Teach Me Tonight" (Sammy Cahn, Gene de Paul) – 9:18
6. "Sweet Georgia Brown" (Ben Bernie, Maceo Pinkard, Kenneth Casey) – 5:10
7. "Soft Winds" (Benny Goodman, Fletcher Henderson) – 6:27

== Personnel ==
=== Performance ===
- Oscar Peterson – piano
- Ray Brown – double bass
- Niels-Henning Ørsted Pedersen – double bass
