= The Oscar Peterson Trio in Tokyo =

Live album by Oscar Peterson
- Released: 1977
- Recorded: May 27, 1972
- Venue: Golden Room, Palace Hotel, Tokyo, Japan
- Genre: Jazz
- Label: Denon Records

Professional ratings
Review scores
Source	Rating
Allmusic	4/5 stars

The Oscar Peterson Trio in Tokyo is a live album by jazz pianist Oscar Peterson and his trio, released in 1977. It was reissued in 2005 with a revised track sequence as Last Trio: Oscar Peterson in Tokyo.

== Track listing ==
1. "The Good Life" (Jean Broussole, Sacha Distel, Jack Reardon) – 5:32
2. "What Am I Here For" (Duke Ellington) – 5:46
3. "I Hear Music" (Burton Lane, Frank Loesser) – 6:36
4. "What Are You Doing the Rest of Your Life?" (Alan Bergman, Marilyn Bergman, Michel Legrand) – 4:53
5. "Strike Up the Band" (George Gershwin, Ira Gershwin) – 4:33
6. "The More I See You" (Mack Gordon, Harry Warren) – 5:36
7. "Wheatland" (Oscar Peterson) – 6:46
8. "The Preacher" (Horace Silver) – 4:26
9. "Old Rockin' Chair" (Hoagy Carmichael) – 4:20
10. "Blues Etude" (Peterson) – 7:03

== Personnel ==
- Oscar Peterson – piano
- Michel Donato – double bass
- Louis Hayes – drums
