= Saturday Night at the Blue Note =

Live album by Oscar Peterson
- Released: 1991
- Recorded: March 17, 1990
- Venue: The Blue Note, New York City
- Genre: Jazz
- Length: 66:35
- Label: Telarc
- Producer: Robert Woods

Oscar Peterson chronology
Live at the Blue Note (1990)	Saturday Night at the Blue Note (1991)	Last Call at the Blue Note (1992)

Professional ratings
Review scores
Source	Rating
Allmusic	4/5 stars
The Penguin Guide to Jazz Recordings	3/4 stars

Saturday Night at the Blue Note is a 1991 live album by Oscar Peterson.

== Track listing ==
1. "Kelly's Blues" – 11:57
2. "Nighttime" – 10:11
3. Medley: "Love Ballade"/"If You Only Knew" – 10:57
4. "You Look Good to Me" (Seymour Lefco, Clement Wells) – 6:39
5. "Old Folks" (Dedette Lee Hill, Willard Robison) – 6:43
6. "Reunion Blues" (Milt Jackson) – 7:17
7. "Song to Elitha" – 11:51

All tracks composed by Oscar Peterson, unless otherwise noted.

== Personnel ==
=== Performance ===
- Oscar Peterson – piano
- Herb Ellis – guitar
- Ray Brown – double bass
- Bobby Durham - drums

=== Production ===
- Donald Elfman - liner notes
- Kenneth Harmann - engineer
- Jack Renner
- Robert Woods - producer
