= The History of an Artist, Vol. 2 =

Compilation album by Oscar Peterson
- Released: 1983
- Recorded: 1972
- Genre: Jazz
- Length: 105:56
- Label: Pablo
- Producer: Norman Granz

Professional ratings
Review scores
Source	Rating
Allmusic	3/5 stars
The Penguin Guide to Jazz Recordings	3/4 stars

The History of an Artist, Vol. 2 is a studio album by Oscar Peterson, the second of two albums so titled to provide a retrospective of his career.

The History of an Artist series marked Peterson's first recordings for Norman Granz' new record label, Pablo Records. Peterson had previously recorded for Granz' three former labels, and would remain with Pablo until the mid-1980s.

== Track listing ==
1. "Wes' Tune" (Wes Montgomery) – 6:37
2. "Reunion Blues" (Milt Jackson) – 8:50
3. "When Your Lover Has Gone" (Einar Aaron Swan) – 7:20
4. "Five O'Clock Whistle" (Kim Gannon, Gene Irwin, Josef Myrow) – 4:07
5. "Old Folks" (Dedette Lee Hill, Willard Robison) – 4:43
6. "Ma (He's Making Eyes at Me)" (Sidney Clare, Con Conrad) – 4:20
7. "Tenderly" (Walter Gross, Jack Lawrence) – 9:28

== Personnel ==
- Oscar Peterson - piano
- Herb Ellis - guitar
- Barney Kessel - guitar
- Ray Brown - double bass
- George Mraz - double bass
- Niels-Henning Ørsted Pedersen - double bass
- Sam Jones - double bass
- Bobby Durham - drums
