= A Royal Wedding Suite =

Studio album by Oscar Peterson
- Released: 1981
- Recorded: April 15, 24–25, 1981
- Genre: Jazz
- Length: 44:36
- Label: Pablo Today
- Producer: Norman Granz

Oscar Peterson chronology
Live at the North Sea Jazz Festival, 1980 (1980)	A Royal Wedding Suite (1981)	Nigerian Marketplace (1981)

Professional ratings
Review scores
Source	Rating
Allmusic	3/5 stars
The Penguin Guide to Jazz Recordings	3/4 stars

A Royal Wedding Suite is a 1981 album by Oscar Peterson. Arranged by Rick Wilkins, Peterson's jazz suite commemorates the 1981 wedding of Charles, Prince of Wales and Lady Diana Spencer at St Paul's Cathedral.

== Track listing ==
1. "Announcement" – 1:27
2. "London Gets Ready" – 5:39
3. "When Summer Comes" – 6:01
4. "It's On" – 5:38
5. "Heraldry" – 4:15
6. "Royal Honeymoon" – 3:46
7. "Jubilation" – 3:56
8. "Lady Di's Waltz" – 5:01
9. "Let the World Sing" – 5:35
10. "The Empty Cathedral" – 3:39

All music composed by Oscar Peterson.

== Personnel ==
=== Performance ===
- Oscar Peterson – piano, electric piano
- Rick Wilkins – arranger, conductor
