= Oscar Peterson Meets Roy Hargrove and Ralph Moore =

Studio album by Oscar Peterson, Roy Hargrove and Ralph Moore
- Released: 1996
- Recorded: June 11–12, 1996
- Genre: Jazz
- Length: 61:01
- Label: Telarc
- Producer: Elaine Martone

Oscar Peterson, Roy Hargrove and Ralph Moore chronology
An Oscar Peterson Christmas (1995)	Oscar Peterson Meets Roy Hargrove and Ralph Moore (1996)	Oscar in Paris (1996)

Professional ratings
Review scores
Source	Rating
Allmusic	4/5 stars
The Penguin Guide to Jazz Recordings	3.5/4 stars

Oscar Peterson Meets Roy Hargrove and Ralph Moore is a 1996 album by Oscar Peterson. It was nominated for a 1997 Juno Award in the category of Best Mainstream Jazz Album.

== Track listing ==
1. "Tin Tin Deo" (Gil Fuller, Chano Pozo) – 5:46
2. "Rob Roy" – 6:45
3. "Blues for Stephane" (Oscar Peterson) – 4:55
4. "My Foolish Heart" (Ned Washington, Victor Young) – 7:36
5. "Cool Walk" – 7:17
6. "Ecstasy" – 6:32
7. "Just Friends" (John Klenner, Sam M. Lewis) – 5:49
8. "Truffles" – 6:26
9. "She Has Gone" – 5:28
10. "North York" – 4:27

== Personnel ==
=== Performance ===
- Oscar Peterson – piano
- Roy Hargrove – trumpet
- Ralph Moore – tenor saxophone
- Niels-Henning Ørsted Pedersen – double bass
- Lewis Nash – drums
