= The History of an Artist =

Compilation album by Oscar Peterson
- Released: 1974
- Recorded: 1972–74
- Genre: Jazz
- Length: 105:56
- Label: Pablo
- Producer: Norman Granz

Oscar Peterson chronology
The Good Life (1974)	The History of an Artist (1974)	Terry's Tune (1974)

Professional ratings
Review scores
Source	Rating
AllMusic	3/5 stars
The Penguin Guide to Jazz Recordings	3.5/4 stars

The History of an Artist is a 1974 double compilation album by Oscar Peterson, the first of two albums so titled to provide a retrospective of his career.

The History of an Artist series marked Peterson's first recordings for Norman Granz' new record label, Pablo Records. Peterson had previously recorded for Granz' three former labels, and would remain with Pablo until the mid-1980s.

== Track listing ==
=== Side 1 ===
1. "R.B. Blues" (Ray Brown) – 3:55
2. "I Wished on the Moon" (Dorothy Parker, Ralph Rainger) – 7:36
3. "You Can Depend on Me" (Charles Carpenter, Louis Dunlap, Earl Hines) – 6:55
4. "This Is Where It's At" (Oscar Peterson) – 7:50

=== Side 2 ===
1. "Okie Blues" (Peterson) – 8:45
2. "I Want to Be Happy" (Irving Caesar, Vincent Youmans) – 4:20
3. "Texas Blues" (Peterson) – 7:35

=== Side 3 ===
1. "Main Stem" (Duke Ellington) – 5:10
2. "Don't Get Around Much Anymore" (Ellington, Bob Russell) – 3:12
3. "Swamp Fire" (Harold Mooney) – 2:52
4. "In a Sentimental Mood" (Ellington, Manny Kurtz, Irving Mills) – 5:09
5. "Greasy Blues (for Count Basie)" (Peterson) – 5:20
6. "Sweety Blues (for Harry "Sweets" Edison)" (Peterson) – 2:59

==== Side 4 ====
1. "Gay's Blues" (Peterson) – 6:00
2. "The Good Life" (Sacha Distel, Jack Reardon) – 5:15
3. "Richard's Round" (Peterson) – 4:20
4. "Lady of the Lavender Mist" (Ellington) – 4:15

== Personnel ==
- Oscar Peterson – piano
- Herb Ellis – guitar
- Irving Ashby – guitar
- Barney Kessel – guitar
- Ray Brown – double bass
- George Mraz – double bass
- Niels-Henning Ørsted Pedersen – double bass
- Sam Jones – double bass
- Bobby Durham – drums
