= Walking the Line (Oscar Peterson album) =

Studio album by Oscar Peterson
- Released: 1971
- Recorded: November 10–13, 1970
- Genre: Jazz
- Length: 44:48
- Label: MPS
- Producer: Hans Georg Brunner-Schwer

Oscar Peterson chronology
Tristeza on Piano (1970)	Walking the Line (1971)	Another Day (1971)

Walking the Line is an album by Canadian jazz pianist and composer Oscar Peterson, released in 1971. Recorded at: MPS Tonstudio Villingen.

== Critical reception ==
Professional ratings
Review scores
Source	Rating
AllMusic	4/5 stars

AllMusic critic Ken Dryden stated in his review: "Oscar Peterson's series of recordings for Hans Georg Brunner-Schwer during the 1960s and early '70s are one of many high points in his long career... His mastery of the ballad form is heard in his sensitive interpretation of "Once Upon a Summertime,"...

== Track listing ==
1. "I Love You" (Cole Porter) – 5:14
2. "Rock of Ages" (Jack Fascinato, Tennessee Ernie Ford) – 5:32
3. "Once Upon a Summertime" (Eddie Barclay, Michel Legrand, Eddy Marnay, Johnny Mercer) – 5:19
4. "Just Friends" (John Klenner, Sam M. Lewis) – 3:58
5. "Teach Me Tonight" (Sammy Cahn, Gene DePaul) – 5:07
6. "The Windmills of Your Mind" (Alan Bergman, Marilyn Bergman, Michel Legrand) – 5:04
7. "I Didn't Know What Time It Was" (Lorenz Hart, Richard Rodgers) – 6:37
8. "All of You" (Porter) – 5:01

== Personnel ==
=== Performance ===
- Oscar Peterson – piano
- George Mraz – double bass
- Ray Price – drums
