= Side by Side (Oscar Peterson and Itzhak Perlman album) =

Studio album by Oscar Peterson and Itzhak Perlman
- Released: 1994
- Recorded: 1994
- Studio: Master Sound, Astoria, New York
- Genre: Jazz
- Length: 61:30
- Label: Telarc

Oscar Peterson chronology
Encore at the Blue Note (1990)	Side by Side (1994)	The More I See You (1995)

Side by Side is a 1994 studio album by the pianist Oscar Peterson and the violinist Itzhak Perlman. Peterson had not recorded or performed since 1990 as a stroke paralyzed his left side making him unable to play. This was Peterson's post stroke album.

== Reception ==
Professional ratings
Review scores
Source	Rating
AllMusic	2/5 stars
The Penguin Guide to Jazz Recordings	3/4 stars

In a review for AllMusic, Scott Yanow stated that the album is "more a loving tribute to the melodies... than a strong jazz date," and commented: "overall this is a so-so effort. It's better to acquire Oscar Peterson's earlier records."

The Chicago Tribune's Howard Reich described Perlman's playing as "mere ornament," but praised Peterson, noting that "everything [he] plays has a melodic appeal and harmonic sophistication that always has marked his best work. Further, the economy of his playing here shows just how much he can say with only a few notes."

The editors of The Absolute Sound gave the album their "What Were They Thinking?" award, and remarked: "I don't know who thought it would be a good idea to pair" the musicians, "but I wouldn't mind taking a hit off of whatever they were smoking at the time."

== Track listing ==
1. "Dark Eyes" (Traditional) – 6:08
2. "Stormy Weather" (Harold Arlen, Ted Koehler) – 4:50
3. "Georgia on My Mind" (Hoagy Carmichael, Stuart Gorrell) – 5:42
4. "Blue Skies" (Irving Berlin) – 4:43
5. "Misty" (Sonny Burke, Erroll Garner) – 5:34
6. "Mack the Knife" (Marc Blitzstein, Bertolt Brecht, Kurt Weill) – 3:29
7. "Nighttime" (Oscar Peterson) – 6:13
8. "I Loves You, Porgy" (George Gershwin, Ira Gershwin, DuBose Heyward) – 4:47
9. "On the Trail" (Harold Adamson, Ferde Grofé) – 4:33
10. "Yours Is My Heart Alone" (Ludwig Herzer, Franz Lehár, Fritz Löhner-Beda) – 5:24
11. "Makin' Whoopee" (Walter Donaldson, Gus Kahn) – 4:44
12. "Why Think About Tomorrow?" (Peterson) – 5:23

== Performers ==
- Oscar Peterson – piano
- Itzhak Perlman – violin
- Herb Ellis – guitar
- Ray Brown – double bass
- Grady Tate – drums
