= Linger Awhile: Live at Newport and More =

Live album by Sarah Vaughan
- Released: January 11, 2000
- Recorded: 1957, April 25, 1978, 1982
- Genre: Vocal jazz
- Length: 48:06
- Label: Pablo
- Producer: Norman Granz

Sarah Vaughan chronology
Brazilian Romance (1989)	Linger Awhile: Live at Newport and More (2000)

Professional ratings
Review scores
Source	Rating
Allmusic	2.5/5 stars

Linger Awhile: Live at Newport and More is a 2000 album by Sarah Vaughan, featuring eight tracks recorded at the 1957 Newport Jazz Festival and studio tracks from 1978 and 1982.

== Track listing ==
1. "If This Isn't Love" (Yip Harburg, Burton Lane) – 2:22
2. "(I'm Afraid) The Masquerade Is Over" (Herb Magidson, Allie Wrubel) – 4:38
3. "All of Me" (Gerald Marks, Seymour Simons) – 2:33
4. "Black Coffee" (Sonny Burke, Paul Francis Webster) – 3:39
5. "Sometimes I'm Happy (Sometimes I'm Blue)" (Irving Caesar, Clifford Grey, Vincent Youmans) – 2:09
6. "Poor Butterfly" (Raymond Hubbell, John Golden) – 4:44
7. "Linger Awhile" (Harry Owens, Vincent Rose) – 1:52
8. Medley: "Time"/"Tenderly" (Bobby Bryant)/(Walter Gross, Jack Lawrence) – 5:16
9. "I Didn't Know What Time It Was" (Lorenz Hart, Richard Rodgers) – 3:13
10. "I Got It Bad (and That Ain't Good)" (Duke Ellington, Webster) – 4:32
11. "That's All" (Alan Brandt, Bob Haymes) – 4:01
12. "I Let a Song Go Out of My Heart" (Ellington, Irving Mills, Henry Nemo, John Redmond) – 3:10
13. "I'm Just a Lucky So-and-So" (Mack David, Ellington) – 4:24
14. "Teach Me Tonight" (Sammy Cahn, Gene de Paul) – 3:05
15. "Just Friends" (John Klenner, Sam M. Lewis) – 3:21
16. "I Hadn't Anyone Till You" (Ray Noble) – 4:06

== Personnel ==
- Sarah Vaughan – vocal
