= Skol (album) =

Live album by Oscar Peterson
- Released: 1979
- Recorded: July 6, 1979
- Genre: Jazz
- Length: 39:02
- Label: Pablo
- Producer: Norman Granz

Oscar Peterson chronology
Night Child (1979)	Skol (1979)	Digital at Montreux (1979)

Professional ratings
Review scores
Source	Rating
Allmusic	4/5 stars
The Penguin Guide to Jazz Recordings	3.5/4 stars

Skol is a 1979 live album by Oscar Peterson, accompanied by Stéphane Grappelli.

== Track listing ==
1. "Nuages" (Jacques Larue, Django Reinhardt) – 8:18
2. "How About You?" (Timothy D. Martin, Walter Edward Meskell) – 5:19
3. "Someone to Watch Over Me" (George Gershwin, Ira Gershwin) – 6:50
4. "Makin' Whoopee" (Walter Donaldson, Gus Kahn) – 5:10
5. "That's All" (Alan Brandt, Bob Haymes) – 7:33
6. "Skol Blues" (Oscar Peterson) – 7:04

== Additional Track listing (2013 Remaster) ==
1. "Honeysuckle Rose" (Andy Razaf) – 6:32
2. "Solitude" (Duke Ellington) – 5:59
3. "I Got Rhythm" (George Gershwin, Ira Gershwin) – 6:33

== Personnel ==
=== Performance ===
- Oscar Peterson – piano
- Stéphane Grappelli – violin
- Joe Pass – guitar
- Niels-Henning Ørsted Pedersen – double bass
- Mickey Roker – drums
