= Another Day (Oscar Peterson album) =

Studio album by Oscar Peterson
- Released: 1971
- Recorded: November 10–13, 1970
- Genre: Jazz
- Length: 44:48
- Label: MPS
- Producer: Hans Georg Brunner-Schwer

Oscar Peterson chronology
Walking the Line (1971)	Another Day (1971)	Tracks (1971)

Another Day is an album by Canadian jazz pianist and composer Oscar Peterson, released in 1971.

== Critical reception ==
Professional ratings
Review scores
Source	Rating
AllMusic	3/5 stars

AllMusic critic Ron Wynn wrote in his review: "He's made so many albums over the years, with a great deal sounding similar, that while they're never bad, sometimes they're for keyboard freaks only. That's something of the case here, although Peterson spins some fabulous solos.

== Track listing ==
1. "Blues for Martha" (Peterson) – 5:11
2. "Greensleeves" (Traditional, Peterson) – 4:27
3. "I'm Old Fashioned" (Jerome Kern, Johnny Mercer) – 4:08
4. "All the Things You Are" (Oscar Hammerstein II, Kern) – 6:13
5. "Too Close for Comfort" (Jerry Bock, Larry Holofcener, George David Weiss) – 4:19
6. "The Jamfs Are Coming" (Johnny Griffin) – 5:40
7. "It Never Entered My Mind" (Richard Rodgers, Lorenz Hart) – 6:01
8. "Carolina Shout" (James P. Johnson) – 3:17

== Personnel ==
=== Performance ===
- Oscar Peterson – piano
- George Mraz – double bass
- Ray Price – drums
