= The Trio (1973 album) =

Live album by Oscar Peterson, Joe Pass, and Niels-Henning Ørsted Pedersen
- Released: 1974
- Recorded: May 16–19, 1973
- Venue: London House, Chicago
- Genre: Jazz
- Length: 40:41
- Label: Pablo
- Producer: Norman Granz

Oscar Peterson chronology
Great Connection (1974)	The Trio (1974)	The Good Life (1974)

Joe Pass chronology
Virtuoso (1973)	The Trio (1973)	Take Love Easy (1973)

The Trio is a jazz live album by pianist Oscar Peterson, guitarist Joe Pass, and bassist Niels-Henning Ørsted Pedersen. Released in 1974, the album won the Grammy Award for Best Jazz Performance by a Group in 1975.

== Reception ==
Professional ratings
Review scores
Source	Rating
AllMusic	5/5 stars
The Penguin Guide to Jazz Recordings	3/4 stars

In his AllMusic review, critic Scott Yanow complimented the playing of Pass and Pedersen but wrote, "the reason to acquire this set is for the remarkable Oscar Peterson. The pianist brilliantly investigates several jazz styles...Peterson really flourished during his years with Norman Granz's Pablo label, and this was one of his finest recordings of the period."

== Track listing ==
1. "Blues Etude" (Oscar Peterson) – 5:31
2. "Chicago Blues" (Peterson) – 13:52
3. "Easy Listening Blues" (Nadine Robinson) – 7:53
4. "Come Sunday" (Duke Ellington) – 3:46
5. "Secret Love" (Sammy Fain, Paul Francis Webster) – 7:15

== Personnel ==
- Oscar Peterson – piano
- Joe Pass – guitar
- Niels-Henning Ørsted Pedersen – bass
