= I've Never Been in Love Before =

Song from the 1950 musical Guys and Dolls

Song
- Published: 1950 by Edwin H. Morris and Company
- Songwriter: Frank Loesser

"I've Never Been in Love Before" is a song written by Frank Loesser, published in 1950.

== Background ==
The song is a duet from the 1950 musical Guys and Dolls, and is sung by the characters Sky Masterson and Sister Sarah Brown. In the play it immediately follows the short solo song "My Time of Day", sung by Sky. Both songs were only used as background music in the 1955 film adaptation of the musical, being replaced by the duet "A Woman in Love".

== Other recordings ==
It is now considered a standard, having been recorded by many artists, including:

- Chet Baker recorded a tender vocal version for his 1956 vocal debut, Chet Baker Sings.
- Shirley Bassey recorded the song for her album The Fabulous Shirley Bassey (1959).
- Jerry Bergonzi
- June Christy - Fair and Warmer! (1957)
- Alma Cogan
- Bing Crosby (recorded September 7, 1950)
- Bobby Darin
- Doris Day
- Billy Eckstine (MGM recorded October 1950)
- Vince Jones
- The Oscar Peterson Trio did a piano jazz arrangement of the tune, recorded and released in 1961 on the live album The Trio.
- Linda Ronstadt
- Gary Wilmot (recorded for his album Where is Love)
- Frank Sinatra (recorded for a special Reprise compilation album entitled Reprise Musical Repertory Theatre Presents 'Guys and Dolls')
- The song was also recorded by Barbra Streisand in 1993 for her album Back to Broadway.
- Laufey recorded the song for her album Everything I Know About Love (2022)
