= Toni (album) =

Studio album by Toni Harper
- Released: 1956
- Recorded: December 29, 1955, January 3, 1956
- Genre: Jazz
- Length: 75:03
- Label: Verve
- Producer: Norman Granz

Toni Harper chronology
Toni (1956)	Lady Lonely (1959)

Professional ratings
Review scores
Source	Rating
Allmusic	3/5 stars

Toni is a 1956 studio album by Toni Harper, accompanied by the Oscar Peterson Quartet.

== Track listing ==
1. "Can't We Be Friends?" (Paul James, Kay Swift) – 3:26
2. "I Could Write a Book" (Lorenz Hart, Richard Rodgers) – 2:36
3. "Gone with the Wind" (Allie Wrubel, Herb Magidson) – 2:21
4. "Singin' in the Rain" (Arthur Freed, Nacio Herb Brown) – 2:51
5. "Love for Sale" (Cole Porter) – 5:34
6. "Just A-Sittin' and A-Rockin'" (Duke Ellington, Billy Strayhorn, Lee Gaines) – 3:22
7. "A Foggy Day" (George Gershwin, Ira Gershwin) – 3:02
8. "You Don't Know What Love Is" (Gene de Paul) – 2:35
9. "Bewitched, Bothered and Bewildered" (Rodgers, Hart) – 4:19
10. "Little Girl Blue" (Rodgers, Hart) – 3:23
11. "You Took Advantage of Me" (Rodgers, Hart) – 2:39
12. "Like Someone in Love" (Jimmy Van Heusen, Johnny Burke) – 4:23

== Personnel ==
- Toni Harper - vocals
- Oscar Peterson – piano
- Ray Brown – double bass
- Herb Ellis - guitar
- Alvin Stoller - drums
