= Summer Night in Munich =

Live album by Oscar Peterson
- Released: February 23, 1999
- Recorded: July 22, 1998, Munich
- Genre: Jazz
- Length: 62:58
- Label: Telarc
- Producer: Robert Woods

Oscar Peterson chronology
Oscar and Benny (1998)	Summer Night in Munich (1999)	The Very Tall Band: Live at the Blue Note (1990)

Professional ratings
Review scores
Source	Rating
Allmusic	4/5 stars
The Penguin Guide to Jazz Recordings	3.5/4 stars

Summer Night in Munich is a 1998 live album by Oscar Peterson released in 1999.

== Track listing ==
1. "Backyard Blues" – 6:56
2. "When Summer Comes" – 9:06
3. "Nigerian Marketplace" – 9:34
4. "Evening Song" – 6:15
5. "Satin Doll" (Duke Ellington, Billy Strayhorn, Johnny Mercer) – 8:20
6. "Love Ballade" – 8:49
7. "Hymn to Freedom" – 5:53
8. "Sushi" – 8:05

All tracks composed by Oscar Peterson, unless otherwise noted.

== Personnel ==
=== Performance ===
- Oscar Peterson – piano
- Ulf Wakenius - guitar
- Martin Drew – drums
- Niels-Henning Ørsted Pedersen – double bass

=== Production ===
- Michael Bishop - engineer
- Jack Renner
- Anilda Carrasquillo - artwork
- Edward Gajdel - photography
- Elaine Martone - production supervisor
- Alyn Shipton - liner notes
- Brian Sooy - cover design
- Robert Woods - executive producer
