= Encore at the Blue Note =

Live album by Oscar Peterson
- Released: 1993
- Recorded: March 16–18, 1990
- Venue: The Blue Note, New York City
- Genre: Jazz
- Length: 61:18
- Label: Telarc
- Producer: Robert Woods

Oscar Peterson chronology
Last Call at the Blue Note (1992)	Encore at the Blue Note (1993)	Side by Side (1994)

Professional ratings
Review scores
Source	Rating
Allmusic	4/5 stars
The Penguin Guide to Jazz Recordings	3/4 stars

Encore at the Blue Note is a 1993 live album by jazz pianist Oscar Peterson. It was recorded shortly before Peterson had a stroke.

== Track listing ==
1. "Falling in Love with Love" (Lorenz Hart, Richard Rodgers) – 9:25
2. "Here's That Rainy Day" (Sonny Burke, Jimmy Van Heusen) – 9:00
3. Medley: "Goodbye Old Girl"/"He Has Gone" (Oscar Peterson)/(Peterson) – 13:00
4. "The Gentle Waltz" (Peterson) – 8:34
5. "Billie's Bounce" (Charlie Parker) – 9:14
6. "The More I See You" (Mack Gordon, Harry Warren) – 5:10
7. "I Wished on the Moon" (Dorothy Parker, Ralph Rainger) – 8:43
8. "Cool Walk" (Peterson) – 10:27

== Personnel ==
=== Performance ===
- Oscar Peterson – piano
- Herb Ellis – guitar
- Bobby Durham – drums
- Ray Brown – double bass

=== Production ===
- Donald Elfman - liner notes
- Kenneth Harmann - engineer
- Jack Renner - recording engineer
- Robert Woods - producer
