= Oscar Peterson and Clark Terry =

Studio album by Oscar Peterson and Clark Terry
- Released: 1975
- Recorded: May 18, 1975
- Genre: Jazz
- Length: 54:22
- Label: Pablo
- Producer: Norman Granz

Oscar Peterson chronology
Oscar Peterson et Joe Pass à Salle Pleyel (1975)	Oscar Peterson and Clark Terry (1975)	Ella and Oscar (1975)

Professional ratings
Review scores
Source	Rating
AllMusic	4.5/5 stars
The Penguin Guide to Jazz Recordings	3/4 stars

Oscar Peterson and Clark Terry is a 1975 album by Oscar Peterson and Clark Terry.

== Track listing ==
1. "On a Slow Boat to China" (Frank Loesser) – 4:24
2. "But Beautiful" (Sonny Burke, Jimmy Van Heusen) – 4:44
3. "Shaw 'Nuff" (Ray Brown, Gil Fuller, Dizzy Gillespie) – 4:29
4. "Satin Doll" (Duke Ellington, Johnny Mercer, Billy Strayhorn) – 7:13
5. "Chops" (Oscar Peterson, Clark Terry) – 4:48
6. "Makin' Whoopee" (Walter Donaldson, Gus Kahn) – 5:56
7. "No Flugel Blues" (Peterson, Terry) – 5:38
8. "Mack the Knife" (Marc Blitzstein, Bertolt Brecht, Kurt Weill) – 4:34

== Personnel ==
- Oscar Peterson – piano
- Clark Terry – trumpet
