= Portraits of Duke Ellington =

Studio album by Joe Pass
- Released: 1975
- Recorded: June 21, 1974
- Studio: Los Angeles
- Genre: Jazz
- Label: Pablo
- Producer: Norman Granz

Joe Pass chronology
Seven, Come Eleven (1974)	Portraits of Duke Ellington (1975)	Joe Pass at the Montreux Jazz Festival 1975 (1975)

Portraits of Duke Ellington is an album by jazz guitarist Joe Pass that was released in 1975. It peaked at number 37 on the Jazz Albums chart. It is a tribute to jazz musician Duke Ellington and was recorded shortly after his death.

== Reception ==
Professional ratings
Review scores
Source	Rating
Allmusic	4.5/5 stars
The Rolling Stone Jazz Record Guide	4/5 stars
The Penguin Guide to Jazz Recordings	3/4 stars

Writing for Allmusic, music critic Scott Yanow wrote of the album "The interplay between the three musicians is quite impressive, and Pass' mastery of the guitar is obvious (he didn't really need the other sidemen). Recommended."

== Track listing ==
All songs composed by Duke Ellington, lyricists indicated.

1. "Satin Doll" (Johnny Mercer, Billy Strayhorn) – 5:46
2. "I Let a Song Go Out of My Heart" (Irving Mills, Henry Nemo, John Redmond) – 5:32
3. "Sophisticated Lady" (Mills, Mitchell Parish) – 3:40
4. "I Got It Bad (and That Ain't Good)" (Paul Francis Webster) – 3:41
5. "In a Mellow Tone" (Milt Gabler) – 6:20
6. "Solitude" (Mills, Eddie DeLange) – 5:06
7. "Don't Get Around Much Anymore" (Bob Russell) – 6:31
8. "Do Nothing till You Hear from Me" (Russell) – 5:53
9. "Caravan" (Mills, Tizol) – 6:10

== Personnel ==
- Joe Pass – guitar
- Ray Brown – double bass
- Bobby Durham – drums

== Chart positions ==
Year	Chart	Position
1975	Billboard Jazz Albums	37
