= The More I See You (Oscar Peterson album) =

Studio album by Oscar Peterson
- Released: 1995
- Recorded: January 15–16, 1995
- Genre: Jazz
- Length: 62:38
- Label: Telarc

Oscar Peterson chronology
Side by Side (1994)	The More I See You (1995)	An Oscar Peterson Christmas (1995)

Professional ratings
Review scores
Source	Rating
Allmusic	4.5/5 stars
The Penguin Guide to Jazz Recordings	3.5/4 stars

The More I See You is a 1995 album by Oscar Peterson, the first album recorded since his stroke, in 1993.

== Track listing ==
1. "In a Mellow Tone" (Duke Ellington, Milt Gabler) – 4:53
2. "Gee Baby, Ain't I Good to You" (Andy Razaf, Don Redman) – 4:45
3. "On the Trail" (Harold Adamson, Ferde Grofé) – 7:03
4. "When My Dreamboat Comes Home" (David Franklin, Cliff Friend) – 8:17
5. "Ron's Blues" (Oscar Peterson) – 8:05
6. "For All We Know" (John Frederick Coots, Sam M. Lewis) – 8:39
7. "Blues for Lisa" (Peterson) – 9:15
8. "Squatty Roo" (Johnny Hodges) – 5:39
9. "The More I See You" (Mack Gordon, Harry Warren) – 6:02

== Personnel ==
- Oscar Peterson – piano
- Benny Carter – alto saxophone
- Clark Terry – flugelhorn
- Ray Brown – double bass
- Lorne Lofsky – guitar
- Lewis Nash – drums
