= Oscar and Benny =

Studio album by Oscar Peterson and Benny Green
- Released: April 28, 1998
- Recorded: September 10–11, 1997
- Genre: Jazz
- Length: 68:11
- Label: Telarc
- Producer: Robert Woods, Elaine Martone

Oscar Peterson chronology
A Tribute to Oscar Peterson - Live at the Town Hall (1997)	Oscar and Benny (1998)	Summer Night in Munich (1999)

Professional ratings
Review scores
Source	Rating
AllMusic	3/5 stars
The Penguin Guide to Jazz Recordings	3.5/4 stars

Oscar and Benny is a 1998 album by Oscar Peterson and Benny Green. Peterson and Green are accompanied by Ray Brown on double bass, and the drummer Gregory Hutchinson.

== Track listing ==
1. "For All We Know" (J. Fred Coots, Sam M. Lewis) – 5:38
2. "When Lights Are Low" (Benny Carter, Spencer Williams) – 6:50
3. "Yours Is My Heart Alone" (Ludwig Herzer, Franz Lehár, Beda Fritz Loehner) – 5:14
4. "Here's That Rainy Day" (Johnny Burke, Jimmy Van Heusen) – 6:36
5. "The More I See You" (Mack Gordon, Harry Warren) – 5:39
6. "Limehouse Blues" (Philip Braham, Douglas Furber) – 4:18
7. "Easy Does It" (Sy Oliver, Trummy Young) – 7:31
8. "Someday My Prince Will Come" (Frank Churchill, Larry Morey) – 5:31
9. "Scrapple from the Apple" (Charlie Parker) – 5:45
10. "Jitterbug Waltz" (Richard Maltby, Jr., Fats Waller) – 6:51
11. "Barbara's Blues" (Oscar Peterson) – 8:18

== Personnel ==
- Oscar Peterson – piano
- Benny Green – piano
- Ray Brown – double bass
- Gregory Hutchinson – drums
