= The Silent Partner (soundtrack) =

Soundtrack album by Oscar Peterson
- Released: 1979
- Recorded: March 14, 1979
- Genre: Jazz
- Length: 40:01
- Label: Pablo Today
- Producer: Norman Granz

Oscar Peterson chronology
The London Concert (1979)	The Silent Partner (1979)	Night Child (1980)

Professional ratings
Review scores
Source	Rating
Allmusic	3/5 stars
The Rolling Stone Jazz Record Guide	3/5 stars

The Silent Partner is a 1979 soundtrack album composed by Oscar Peterson, for the 1978 film The Silent Partner.

== Track listing ==
All compositions by Oscar Peterson

1. "Theme for Celine" - 7:43
2. "The Happy Hour" - 5:01
3. "Party Time U.S.A." - 4:50
4. "First Reprise on Theme for Celine" - 2:56
5. "Elliot (The Silent Partner)" - 7:27
6. "Theme for Susannah" - 4:07
7. "Blues for Chris (The Fox)" - 5:57
8. "Second Reprise on Theme for Celine" - 3:33

== Personnel ==
- Oscar Peterson – piano
- Benny Carter – alto saxophone
- Zoot Sims – tenor saxophone
- Clark Terry – flugelhorn
- Milt Jackson – vibraphone
- John Heard – double bass
- Grady Tate – drums
