= The Personal Touch =

Studio album by Oscar Peterson
- Released: 1980
- Recorded: January 28–29 & February 19, 1980
- Genre: Jazz
- Length: 40:01
- Label: Pablo Today
- Producer: Norman Granz

Oscar Peterson chronology
Digital at Montreux (1979)	The Personal Touch (1980)	The Trumpet Summit Meets the Oscar Peterson Big 4 (1980)

Professional ratings
Review scores
Source	Rating
AllMusic	3/5 stars
The Penguin Guide to Jazz Recordings	3.5/4 stars
The Rolling Stone Jazz Record Guide	3/5 stars

The Personal Touch is a 1980 studio album by Oscar Peterson, featuring songs written by or made popular by Canadians.

== Track listing ==
1. "Some of These Days" (Shelton Brooks) – 3:46
2. "I'll Never Smile Again" (Ruth Lowe) – 2:31
3. "The Waltz I Blew for Yew" (Rob McConnell) – 3:51
4. "The Swingin' Shepherd Blues" (Moe Koffman) – 3:23
5. "Wheels of Life" (Gino Vannelli) – 3:37
6. "Spinning Wheel" (David Clayton-Thomas) – 4:06
7. "Summer's Going" (Steve Cassini, Nick Kolisnyk) – 4:10
8. "The World Is Waiting for the Sunrise" (Gene Lockhart, Ernest Seitz) – 2:22
9. "You Needed Me" (Randy Goodrum) – 3:50
10. "Theme for Celine" (Oscar Peterson) – 3:33
11. "Sweethearts on Parade" (Carmen Lombardo, Charles Newman) – 2:25
12. "Sometimes When We Touch" (Dan Hill, Barry Mann) – 5:04
13. "The Personal Touch" (Peterson) – 0:56

== Personnel ==
- Oscar Peterson – piano, vocal
- Clark Terry – flugelhorn
- Dave Young – double bass
- Ed Bickert – guitar
- Peter Leitch – guitar
- Jerry Fuller – drums
