= Nigerian Marketplace =

Live album by Oscar Peterson
- Released: 1981
- Recorded: July 16, 1981
- Genre: Jazz
- Length: 43:23
- Label: Pablo
- Producer: Norman Granz

Oscar Peterson chronology
A Royal Wedding Suite (1981)	Nigerian Marketplace (1981)	Ain't But a Few of Us Left (1982)

Professional ratings
Review scores
Source	Rating
Allmusic	4/5 stars
The Rolling Stone Jazz Record Guide	2/5 stars
The Penguin Guide to Jazz Recordings	3.5/4 stars

Nigerian Marketplace is a 1981 live album by Oscar Peterson, accompanied by Niels-Henning Ørsted Pedersen and Terry Clarke, recorded at the 1981 Montreux Jazz Festival.

== Track listing ==
1. "Nigerian Marketplace" – 8:31
2. "Au Privave" – 6:53
3. "Misty/Waltz For Debby" – 8:28
4. "Nancy (With the Laughing Face)" – 8:17
5. "Cakewalk" – 6:48
6. "You Look Good to Me" – 6:53

== Personnel ==
=== Performance ===
- Terry Clarke – drums
- Niels-Henning Ørsted Pedersen – double bass
- Oscar Peterson – piano
