= Face to Face (Oscar Peterson and Freddie Hubbard album) =

Studio album by Oscar Peterson and Freddie Hubbard
- Released: 1982
- Recorded: May 24, 1982
- Studio: Group IV Studios, Hollywood, CA
- Genre: Jazz
- Length: 45:54
- Label: Pablo
- Producer: Norman Granz

Oscar Peterson chronology
Ain't But a Few of Us Left (1982)	Face to Face (1982)	Oscar Peterson with Clark Terry (1982)

Professional ratings
Review scores
Source	Rating
Allmusic	4/5 stars

Face to Face is a 1982 album by Oscar Peterson, accompanied by Freddie Hubbard. Hubbard revists some pieces he recorded in the 1960s: "Thermo" and "Weaver of Dreams."

== Track listing ==
No.	Title	Writer(s)	Length
1.	"All Blues"	Miles Davis	13:55
2.	"Thermo"	Freddie Hubbard	8:21
3.	"Weaver of Dreams"	Jack Elliott, Victor Young	8:30
4.	"Portrait of Jenny"	Gordon Burdge, J. Russel Robinson	6:52
5.	"Tippin'"	Oscar Peterson	7:00

== Personnel ==
=== Performance ===
- Oscar Peterson – piano
- Freddie Hubbard – trumpet & flugelhorn
- Joe Pass – guitar
- Niels-Henning Ørsted Pedersen – double bass
- Martin Drew – drums

=== Production ===
- Producer – Norman Granz
- Recording Engineer – Dennis S. Sands
- Remix Engineer – Andy Daddario
- Remastering, 1997 – Joe Tarantino (Fantasy Studios)
