= Night Child (album) =

Studio album by Oscar Peterson, Joe Pass
- Released: 1979
- Recorded: April 11–12, 1979
- Studio: Sounds Interchange, Ltd, Toronto, Canada
- Genre: Jazz
- Length: 42:54
- Label: Pablo Today
- Producer: Norman Granz

Oscar Peterson chronology
The Silent Partner (1978)	Night Child (1979)	Skol (1979)

Joe Pass chronology
Digital III at Montreux (1979)	Night Child (1979)	Northsea Nights (1980)

Professional ratings
Review scores
Source	Rating
AllMusic	3/5 stars
The Rolling Stone Jazz Record Guide	3/5 stars

Night Child is an album by Canadian pianist Oscar Peterson, accompanied by Joe Pass, Niels-Henning Ørsted Pedersen and Louie Bellson. It is notable in that all compositions are by Peterson and he plays the majority of the songs on electric piano. The album cover depicts his son Joel Peterson, to whom the album is dedicated.

== Track listing ==
1. "Solar Winds" – 6:50
2. "Dancin' Feet" – 6:20
3. "Soliloquy (Blues for Dr. John)" – 9:13
4. "Night Child" – 11:35
5. "Charlie" – 3:09
6. "Teenager" – 5:47

All music written by Oscar Peterson.

== Personnel ==
=== Performance ===
- Oscar Peterson – piano (acoustic and electric)
- Joe Pass – guitar
- Niels-Henning Ørsted Pedersen – double bass
- Louie Bellson – drum kit

== Production notes ==
- Norman Granz – producer
- Phil Sheridan – engineer

== Chart positions ==
Year	Chart	Position
1979	Billboard Jazz Albums	23
