= Ain't but a Few of Us Left =

Studio album by Milt Jackson and Oscar Peterson
- Released: 1982
- Recorded: November 30, 1981
- Genre: Jazz
- Length: 39:40
- Label: Pablo
- Producer: Norman Granz

Milt Jackson chronology
Night Mist (1981)	Ain't but a Few of Us Left (1982)	In London (1982)

Oscar Peterson chronology
Nigerian Marketplace (1981)	Ain't But a Few of Us Left (1982)	Face to Face (1982)

Professional ratings
Review scores
Source	Rating
AllMusic	4/5 stars
The Penguin Guide to Jazz Recordings	3.5/4 stars

Ain't but a Few of Us Left is an album by jazz musicians Milt Jackson and Oscar Peterson, released in 1982.

== Track listing ==
1. "Ain't but a Few of Us Left" (Milt Jackson) – 7:26
2. "Stuffy" (Coleman Hawkins) – 5:59
3. "A Time for Love" (Johnny Mandel, Paul Francis Webster) – 5:57
4. "Body and Soul" (Edward Heyman, Robert Sour, Frank Eyton, Johnny Green) – 5:56
5. "If I Should Lose You" (Ralph Rainger, Leo Robin) – 8:02
6. "What Am I Here For?" (Duke Ellington, Frankie Laine) – 6:20

== Personnel ==
- Milt Jackson – vibraphone
- Oscar Peterson – piano
- Ray Brown – bass
- Grady Tate – drums
