= Reunion Blues =

Studio album by Oscar Peterson wirh Milt Jackson, Ray Brown and Louis Hayes
- Released: 1972
- Recorded: July 1971
- Studio: MPS Ton-Studio, Villingen-Schwenningen, Germany
- Genre: Jazz
- Length: 40:38
- Label: MPS
- Producer: Hans Georg Brunner-Schwer

Oscar Peterson chronology
In Tune (1971)	Reunion Blues (1972)	Jazz at Santa Monica Civic '72 (1972)

Milt Jackson chronology
Plastic Dreams (1971)	Reunion Blues (1972)	Cherry (1972)

Professional ratings
Review scores
Source	Rating
AllMusic	3/5 stars
The Penguin Guide to Jazz Recordings	3/4 stars
The Rolling Stone Jazz Record Guide	2/5 stars

Reunion Blues is a 1972 album by Oscar Peterson with Milt Jackson, Ray Brown and Louis Hayes.

== Track listing ==
1. "(I Can't Get No) Satisfaction" (Mick Jagger, Keith Richards) – 4:04
2. "Dream of You" (Benny Carter, Irving Mills) – 4:17
3. "Some Day My Prince Will Come" (Frank Churchill, Larry Morey) – 6:11
4. "A Time for Love" (Johnny Mandel, Paul Francis Webster) – 5:28
5. "Reunion Blues" (Milt Jackson) – 6:39
6. "When I Fall in Love" (Edward Heyman, Victor Young) – 5:14
7. "Red Top" (Lionel Hampton, Ben Kynard) – 8:45

== Personnel ==
Performance

- Oscar Peterson – piano
- Milt Jackson – vibraphone
- Ray Brown – double bass
- Louis Hayes – drums

Production

- Hans Georg Brunner-Schwer – producer, engineer
- Willi Fruth – recording supervisor
- Wolfgang Baumann – design
- Hans Harzheim – photography
- Josef Werkmeister – photography
