= A Night in Vienna =

Live album by Oscar Peterson
- Released: July 13, 2004
- Recorded: November 21, 2003
- Venues: The Musikverein, Vienna, Austria
- Genre: Jazz
- Length: 45:54
- Label: Verve

Oscar Peterson chronology
| Solo (2002) | A Night in Vienna (2004) | Fly me to the Moon (2006) |

Professional ratings
Review scores
| Source | Rating |
|---|---|
| The Penguin Guide to Jazz Recordings | 3.5/4 stars |

A Night in Vienna is a 2004 live album by Oscar Peterson recorded at the Musikverein in Vienna, Austria on Friday, November 21, 2003.

== Track listing ==
1. Intro – 0:58
2. "Night Time" – 8:35
3. "When Summer Comes" – 7:10
4. "Cakewalk" – 8:31
5. "Requiem" – 8:49
6. "Wheatland" – 9:19
7. "The Backyard Blues" – 8:13
8. "Satin Doll" (Duke Ellington, Johnny Mercer, Billy Strayhorn) – 9:48
9. "Sweet Georgia Brown" (Ben Bernie, Kenneth Casey, Maceo Pinkard) – 8:23
10. "Hymn to Freedom" – 7:56

All music written by Oscar Peterson, unless otherwise noted.

== Personnel ==
Performance

- Oscar Peterson – piano
- Ulf Wakenius – guitar
- Niels-Henning Ørsted Pedersen – double bass
- Martin Drew – drums
