= Soon (1927 song) =

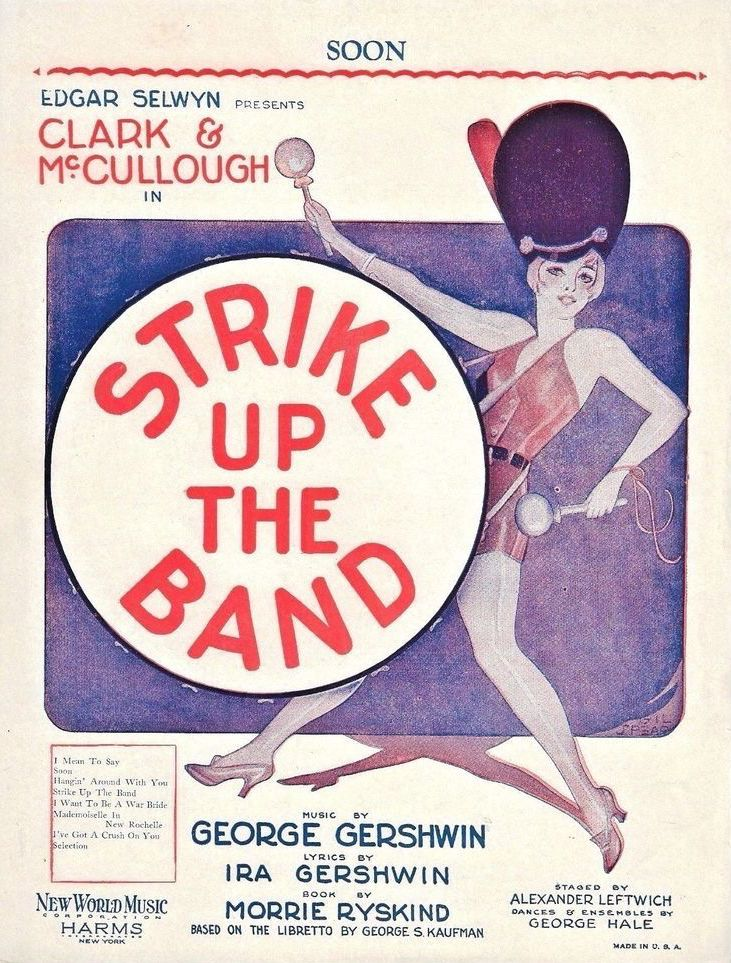
- Sheet music cover

Song
- Written: 1927
- Published: 1929
- Genre: Traditional pop
- Composer: George Gershwin
- Lyricist: Ira Gershwin

"Soon" is a 1927 song composed by George Gershwin, with lyrics by Ira Gershwin. The song was copyrighted in 1929, and entered the public domain in January 2025. (Note: Under R184528)

It was introduced by Margaret Schilling and Jerry Goff in the 1930 revision of the musical Strike Up the Band.

== Notable recordings ==
- Sarah Vaughan - In the Land of Hi-Fi (1955)
- Ella Fitzgerald - Ella Sings Gershwin (1950), Ella Fitzgerald Sings the George and Ira Gershwin Songbook (1959)
- Curtis Fuller - The Opener (1957)
- Mitzi Gaynor - Mitzi Gaynor Sings the Lyrics of Ira Gershwin (1959)
- Oscar Peterson - The Trio (1961)
- Sammy Davis Jr. - The Wham of Sam (1961)
- The Modern Jazz Quartet - Gershwin Ballad Medley (1958)
- Kiri Te Kanawa - Kiri Sings Gershwin (1987)
- Gary Burton et al - Like Minds (1998)
