= Edward Gajdel =

Canadian photographer

- Born: August 1, 1958 (age 67); Sokółka, Poland
- Citizenship: Canada
- Occupations: Photographer, filmmaker
- Years active: 1983–present
- Spouse: Djanka Gajdel (m. 1984)
- Children: 3
- Website: edwardgajdel.com

Edward Gajdel (born August 1, 1958) is a Polish-Canadian photographer and filmmaker based in Toronto, Ontario, Canada. He is known for his portrait and editorial photography, with a career spanning more than four decades. His work has appeared in North American and international publications including Toronto Life, Maclean's, GQ, Elle, Time, and Fortune. His photographs are held in the collections of the National Gallery of Canada and the National Museum of American History at the Smithsonian Institution.

== Early life and education ==
Gajdel was born in Sokółka, Poland, to a Russian-born father and a Polish mother, who met in a German labour camp during World War II. In 1967, his family immigrated to Canada and settled in Beiseker, Alberta. He developed an interest in photography at an early age.

In 1978, he enrolled in the Photographic Arts program at the Northern Alberta Institute of Technology in Edmonton. After graduating, he attended a workshop with photographer Michel Tcherevkoff and later interned with him in New York City.

== Career ==
In 1983, Gajdel travelled to Europe to pursue editorial work, including projects associated with Vogue Italia. He returned to Canada later that year and settled in Toronto, where he established his studio.

His work has appeared in publications including Toronto Life, Flare, Maclean's, and Entertainment Weekly, as well as international publications such as GQ, Elle, Time, Fortune, Esquire, and Life.

In addition to editorial work, Gajdel has undertaken commercial assignments for global clients, including Nike.

Over the course of his career, he has photographed a range of public figures, including Canadian Prime Ministers Jean Chrétien and Brian Mulroney; international political leaders including Eduardo Frei Ruiz-Tagle (Chile), Carlos Salinas de Gortari (Mexico), and Ernesto Zedillo (Mexico); and cultural figures including Stephen King, Tom Hanks, Norman Jewison, Oscar Peterson, Faye Dunaway, Christopher Plummer, Metallica, Diana Krall, Vince Carter, and Chris Farley.

== Collections and exhibitions ==
Gajdel's work was acquired by the Canadian Museum of Contemporary Photography and the Canadian Archives, and has since been incorporated into the National Gallery of Canada's collection. His work is also held by the National Museum of American History at the Smithsonian Institution in Washington, D.C.

His commercial photography was included in the Royal Ontario Museum exhibition 50 Years of Advertising.

== Film work ==
In addition to photography, Gajdel has worked in film. His short film Repeat screened at international film festivals, including the Berlin and Buffalo film festivals. His documentary Just An Inconvenience: A Portrait of Rosemary (2017), for which he served as cinematographer, editor, and sound editor, screened at the Buffalo Film Festival.

He also worked as cinematographer and assistant director on Unearthing Ogawa, which screened internationally and aired on PBS. The film received Best U.S. Documentary at the International Manhattan Film Awards in 2022.

Gajdel was appointed Photo Laureate for LOT42 Global Flex Campus in Kitchener, Ontario. His images are in the documentary 'I am Chris Farley' and of Oscar Peterson in Oscar Peterson: Black + White.

== Awards and recognition ==
Gajdel has received awards from the National Magazine Awards Foundation, including gold, silver, and honourable mentions for work published in Toronto Life, Canadian Business, Financial Times, The Globe and Mail, and enRoute.

His work has also been recognized by the Advertising & Design Club of Canada, the Canadian Association of Professional Image Creators, and Applied Arts Magazine.

Internationally, he has received recognition from American Photography Annual, World Press Photo, Kodak, and Communication Arts, including multiple Awards of Excellence.

He is a recipient of the Queen Elizabeth II Diamond Jubilee Medal.

== Personal life ==
Gajdel married Djanka in 1984. They have three children and reside in Toronto.
