= It Never Entered My Mind =

Show tune from the 1940 musical Higher and Higher

Song
- Published: 1940
- Songwriter: Lorenz Hart
- Composer: Richard Rodgers

"It Never Entered My Mind" is a show tune from the 1940 Rodgers and Hart musical Higher and Higher, where it was introduced by Shirley Ross.

== Notable recordings ==
- Frank Sinatra – Frankly Sentimental (1949) Originally recorded November 5, 1947, In the Wee Small Hours (1955), She Shot Me Down (1981)
- Patty Andrews (with Gordon Jenkins and orchestra) (1951)
- Julie London – Julie Is Her Name (1955)
- Miles Davis – Miles Davis, Volume 3 (Blue Note 1954) & Workin' with the Miles Davis Quintet (Prestige 1956)
- Ella Fitzgerald – Ella Fitzgerald Sings the Rodgers & Hart Songbook (1956)
- Coleman Hawkins and Ben Webster – Coleman Hawkins Encounters Ben Webster (1957)
- Stan Getz – Stan Getz and J. J. Johnson at the Opera House (1957)
- Jeri Southern – Southern Hospitality (1958)
- Stan Getz – Jazz Giants '58
- Sarah Vaughan – Sarah Vaughan Sings Broadway: Great Songs from Hit Shows (1958)
- Chet Baker – Chet (1959)
- Stan Getz – Cool Velvet: Stan Getz and Strings (1960)
- Anita O'Day – Anita O'Day and Billy May Swing Rodgers and Hart (1960)
- Chris Connor – Double Exposure with Maynard Ferguson (1961), Warm Cool: The Atlantic Years (2000)
- June Christy – The Intimate Miss Christy (1963)
- Rosemary Clooney – Love (1963)
- Johnny Hartman – The Voice That Is!! (1964)
- Oscar Peterson – Another Day (1972)
- Jackie McLean with the Great Jazz Trio – New Wine in Old Bottles (1978)
- Keith Jarrett Trio – Standards (1983)
- Chris Botti – Italia (2007)

== Popular culture ==
- The Miles Davis recording was used in the following movies: Runaway Bride (1999) and the Lenny Bruce biopic Lenny (1974).
