= London House (Chicago) =

Jazz club and restaurant (1946–1975)

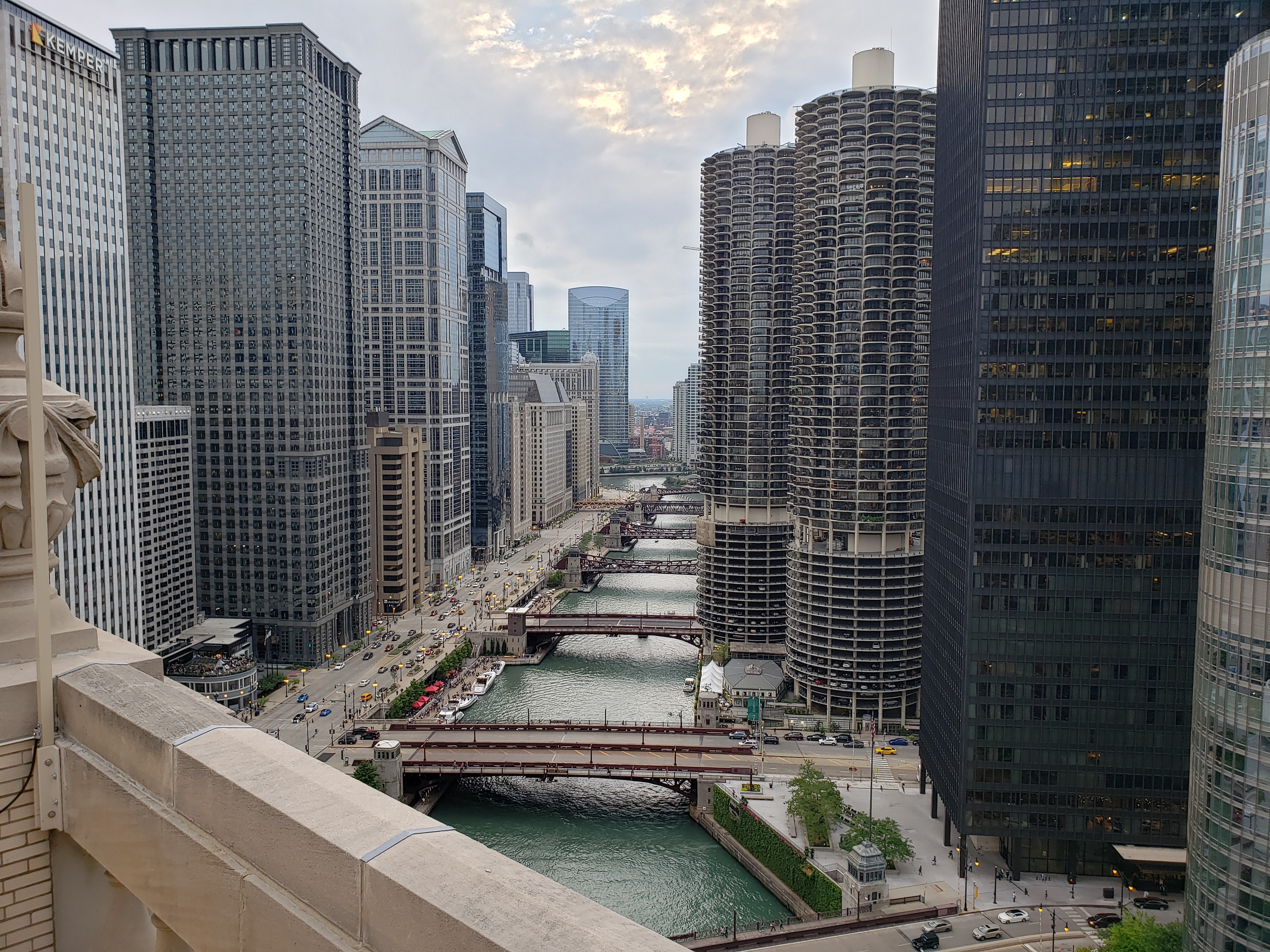
View from the London House rooftop bar

The London House was a jazz club and restaurant in Chicago located at the corner of Wacker Drive and Michigan Avenue, in the London Guaranty and Accident Company Building.

== History ==
Renovated in 1946 by George and Oscar Marienthal, the London House was crafted from the building's original 1920s Fort Dearborn Grill. Known as a dining spot, London House was revamped in 1955 to become a club that featured jazz and stayed open until 4:00 a.m. It gained notoriety from jazz artists who made commercial recordings there.

Notable performers included Oscar Peterson, Ramsey Lewis, Bill Evans, Dave Brubeck, Marian McPartland, Dinah Washington, Cannonball Adderley, Erroll Garner, Ahmad Jamal, Nancy Wilson, Barbara Carroll and Bobby Short. Frank Sinatra Jr. made his Chicago debut there on the club's 20th anniversary in November 1966.

Arts and Leisure Co. bought the club in 1969; it was sold to Paul Wimmer in 1971. However, jazz music's popularity had decreased and the club closed in January 1975. Ramsey Lewis was London House's last headliner on January 12.

Jerry Dambra, managing partner from 1971 to 1975 (and also managing partner of Mister Kelly's in Chicago) famously said, "I was a lucky man to close the two greatest clubs in the world."

== Legacy ==
After an extensive renovation project, the building reopened as the LondonHouse Chicago hotel on May 26, 2016.

== Recorded at London House ==
The following albums were recorded at the London House.

- 1956 – Billy Taylor at the London House
- 1958 – Marian McPartland, Marian McPartland Trio: At the London House
- 1958 – Sarah Vaughan, After Hours at the London House
- 1959 – Gene Krupa, Big Noise From Winnetka, Gene Krupa At The London House
- 1959 – Bobby Hackett, Live from London House
- 1959 – Johnny Pate, A Date With Johnny Pate
- 1960s- Teddy Wilson and Earl Hines, Live at London House
- 1961 – Tyree Glenn, Tyree Glenn at the London House in Chicago
- 1961 – Oscar Peterson, The Sound of the Trio
- 1961 – Oscar Peterson, Something Warm
- 1961 - The Many Faces of Dorothy Donegan
- 1961 - Henry Red Allen Quartet Live at the London House Chicago
- 1962 – Charlie Shavers Live at the London House
- 1963 – Coleman Hawkins at the London House
- 1966 – The Three Sounds - Today's Sounds
- 1969 – The Soulful Strings - Back By Demand, In Concert
- 1969 – Jack McDuff, Gin and Orange
- 1973 – Jo Jones, Jo Jones And Guest Stars
