= MPS Records discography =

This is the discography of the MPS Records jazz music record label.

== Discography ==
| Catalog | Artist | Album | Notes |
|---|---|---|---|
| 15100 | Hans Koller | Vision | |
| 15101 | Willie "The Lion" Smith | Music on My Mind | |
| 15102 | Various Artists | Folklore e Bossa Nova do Brasil | |
| 15109 | Alexander von Schlippenbach | Globe Unity | |
| 15110 | Milt Buckner | Play Chords | Also released on Prestige Records |
| 15111 | Fats Sadi | Ensadinado | |
| 15112 | Attila Zoller | Katz und Maus | |
| 15114 | Art Van Damme | The Gentle Art of Art | |
| 15115 | Art Van Damme | Ecstasy | |
| 15117 | Johnny Teupen | Play Harp | |
| 15118 | Rolf Kühn & Joachim Kühn Quintet | Transfiguration | |
| 15119 | Ambros Seelos Orchester | Your Favorites | |
| 15122 | Gustav Brom | Swinging the Jazz | |
| 15126 | Erwin Lehn und Sein Südfunk-Tanzorchester | Musicals on Parade | |
| 15127 | Dieter Reith | A Happy Afternoon | |
| 15132 | George Gruntz | Noon in Tunisia | |
| 15133 | George Gruntz | Drums and Folklore: From Sticksland with Love | |
| 15136 | Francy Boland | Flirt and Dream | |
| 15137 | Francy Boland | Out of the Background | |
| 15138 | The Kenny Clarke-Francy Boland Big Band | Sax No End | |
| 15139 | Jean-Luc Ponty | Sunday Walk | Also released on Prestige |
| 15142 | Irene Schweizer | Jazz Meets India | |
| 15143 | Pedro Iturralde | Flamenco Jazz | |
| 15144 | Ambros Seelos Orchester | Beat and Sweet Meet Ambros Seelos | |
| 15145 | Tony Scott and the Indonesian All Stars | Djanger Bali | |
| 15146 | Various Artists | Berlin Festival Guitar Workshop | |
| 15147 | Stuff Smith | Black Violin | Also released on Prestige |
| 15148 | Archie Shepp | Live at the Donaueschingen Music Festival | |
| 15149 | Hampton Hawes | Hamp's Piano | Also released on Prestige |
| 15150 | Baden Powell | Poema on Guitar | |
| 15151 | Mark Murphy | Midnight Mood | |
| 15152 | Toni Stricker Star Ensemble | Dancing in the Dark | |
| 15153 | Robert Patterson Singers | Gospel Meeting Tonight | |
| 15154 | Erwin Lehn Beat-Brass | Beat Flames | |
| 15156 | Eugen Cicero | Plays Franz Liszt: Romantic Swing | |
| 15158 | Benny Bailey All Stars | Soul Eyes | |
| 15159 | Ben Webster & Don Byas | Ben Webster Meets Don Byas | Also released on Prestige |
| 15160 | Karel Velebny Nonet | SHQ & Woodwinds | |
| 15162 | Heinz Kiessling Orchester | Happy Rallye | |
| 15163 | Tete Montoliu | Piano for Nuria | |
| 15164 | Barney Wilen | Auto Jazz: Tragic Destiny Of Lorenzo Bandini | |
| 15165 | Orchester Roland Kovac | Trip to the Mars | |
| 15166 | Maynard Ferguson | Trumpet Rhapsody | |
| 15169 | Novi Quartet | Novi in Wonderland | |
| 15170 | Attila Zoller, Lee Konitz, Albert Mangelsdorff | Zo-Ko-Ma | |
| 15171 | Art Van Damme | Lullaby in Rhythm | |
| 15172 | Art Van Damme | Art in the Black Forest | |
| 15174 | Saints & Sinners | In Europe: Sugar | |
| 15176 | Benny Bailey and His Orchestra | The Balkan in My Soul | |
| 15178 | Oscar Peterson | Action | Also released on Prestige |
| 15179 | Oscar Peterson | Girl Talk | Also released on Prestige |
| 15180 | Oscar Peterson | The Way I Really Play | Also released on Prestige |
| 15181 | Oscar Peterson | My Favorite Instrument | Also released on Prestige |
| 15183 | Dee Dee, Barry & The Movements | Soul Hour | |
| 15186 | George Gruntz | St. Peter Power | |
| 15188 | Berry Lipman | Music for Drivers 1 | |
| 15189 | The Amber-Rock Association | Amber Rock | |
| 15191 | Barney Wilen & His Amazing Free Rock Band | Dear Prof. Leary | |
| 15192 | Lee Konitz, Pony Poindexter, Phil Woods and Leo Wright | Alto Summit | Also released on Prestige |
| 15193 | Steve Kühn | Watch What Happens! | |
| 15195 | Charly Antolini | Soul Beat | |
| 15196 | Dejan's Original Olympia Brass Band | New Orleans Street Parade | |
| 15199 | Milt Buckner | Locked Hands | |
| 15200 | Frau Sibylle, Dr. Med. Ossy Knolle & Bert Loska mit Seinem Sternen-Sex-Tett | Liebes-Horoskop | |
| 15201 | Berry Lipman | Music for Drivers 2 | |
| 15202 | Ambros Seelos | Fire | |
| 15204 | Don Cherry | Eternal Rhythm | |
| 15205 | Wolfgang Dauner / Fred Van Hove | Psalmus Spei / Requiem for Che Guevara | |
| 15207 | Dizzy Gillespie | The Dizzy Gillespie Reunion Big Band | |
| 15209 | Eugen Cicero | Klavierspielereien | |
| 15210 | Albert Mangelsdorff | Albert Mangelsdorff and His Friends | |
| 15212 | Nelson Riddle | Changing Colors | |
| 15213 | The Kenny Clarke-Francy Boland Big Band | Latin Kaleidoscope | Also released on Prestige |
| 15214 | The Kenny Clarke-Francy Boland Big Band | All Smiles | |
| 15215 | Dave Pike Set | Noisy Silence-Gentle Noise | |
| 15216 | Ambros Seelos | Dance for Everybody | |
| 15217 | Jan Hammer | Maliny Maliny | Also released as Make Love |
| 15218 | The Kenny Clarke-Francy Boland Big Band | Faces | |
| 15219 | Bulgarian Jazz Quartet | Jazz Focus '65 | |
| 15220 | The Kenny Clarke-Francy Boland Big Band | Fellini 712 | |
| 15221 | Oscar Peterson | Mellow Mood | |
| 15222 | Oscar Peterson | Travelin' On | |
| 15223 | Various Artists | Jazz Meets the World | |
| 15225 | Friedrich Gulda | The Air from Other Planets | |
| 15226 | Friedrich Gulda | Vienna Revisited | |
| 15228 | Albert Nicholas, Herb Flemming, Nelson Williams, Benny Waters, Joe Turner, Wallace Bishop | The Great Traditionalists in Europ | |
| 15229 | Albert Mangelsdorff | Wild Goose | |
| 15230 | Dexter Gordon | A Day in Copenhagen | Also released on Prestige |
| 15231 | Lucky Thompson | A Lucky Songbook in Europe | |
| 15233 | Dixieland Kings | Dixieland Sensation | |
| 15234 | Billy Taylor | Sleeping Bee | Also release on Prestige as Billy Taylor Today |
| 15235 | Art Van Damme Quintet | On the Road | |
| 15236 | Art Van Damme Ensemble | Art and Four Brothers | |
| 15237 | Milt Buckner | More Chords | |
| 15239 | Joachim Kühn | Bold Music | |
| 15240 | Gustav Brom | Missa Jazz | |
| 15242 | The Maxwells | Maxwell Street | |
| 15244 | Chicago Blues All Stars | Loaded with the Blues | |
| 15245 | Jim Hall | It's Nice to Be With You | |
| 15247 | Johnny Teupen | Harpadelic | |
| 15248 | Wolfgang Dauner | The Oimels | |
| 15249 | John Tchicai | Afrodisiaca | |
| 15250 | Ella Fitzgerald | Sunshine of Your Love | |
| 15251 | Oscar Peterson | Motions and Emotions | |
| 15252 | Erroll Garner | Up in Errol's Room | |
| 15253 | Dave Pike Set | Four Reasons | |
| 15254 | Joe Turner | Smashing Thirds | |
| 15255 | Newport All Stars | Tribute to Duke | |
| 15256 | Stars of Faith of Black Nativity | Swing Low Sweet Chariot | |
| 15257 | Dave Pike Set | Live at the Philharmonie | |
| 15259 | Various Artists | The Down Beat Poll Winners in Europe: Open Space | |
| 15260 | Yancy Körössy | Identification | |
| 15261 | Mike Nock Underground | Between or Beyond | |
| 15262 | Oscar Peterson | Hello Herbie | |
| 15263 | The Third Wave | Here and Now | |
| 15264 | Count Basie and His Orchestra | Basic Basie | |
| 15266 | Richard Davis | Muses for Richard Davis | |
| 15267 | Freddie Hubbard | The Hub of Hubbard | |
| 15268 | Fritz Pauer | Live at the Berlin Jazz Galerie | |
| 15269 | Baden-Baden Free Jazz Orchestra conducted by Lester Bowie | Gittin' to Know Y'All | |
| 15270 | Wolfgang Dauner Trio | Music Zounds | |
| 15271 | Friedrich Gulda | It's All One | |
| 15272 | Friedrich Gulda | As You Like It | |
| 15273 | Horst Jankowski | Jankowskinetik | |
| 15274 | Albert Mangelsdorff | Never Let It End | |
| 15275 | Oscar Peterson | Tristeza on Piano | |
| 15276 | New Jazz Trio | Page One | |
| 15277 | Art Van Damme | Blue World | |
| 15278 | Art Van Damme | Keep Going | |
| 15279 | Joe Pass | Intercontinental | |
| 15280 | Dave Pike Set | Infra-Red | |
| 15281 | Buddy Tate Celebrity Club Orchestra | Unbroken | |
| 15282 | Art Farmer | From Vienna with Art | |
| 15283 | Eddie "Lockjaw" Davis-Johnny Griffin | Tough Tenors Again 'n' Again | |
| 15284 | Knut Kiesewetter | Stop! Watch! and Listen! | |
| 15285 | Count Basie and His Orchestra | High Voltage | |
| 15286 | Milt Buckner | Birthday Party for H.G.B.S. | |
| 15287 | The Kenny Clarke-Francy Boland Big Band | More Smiles | |
| 15288 | The Kenny Clarke-Francy Boland Big Band | All Blues | |
| 15289 | Sun Ra | It's After the End of the World | |
| 15290 | Earl Hines | Fatha and His Flock – On Tour | |
| 15291 | Anita O'Day | Anita O'Day in Berlin | |
| 15292 | Eddie Louiss | Our Kind of Sabi | |
| 15293 | Egberto Gismonti | Orfeo Novo | |
| 15294 | Erroll Garner | Feeling is Believing | |
| 15295 | Eugen Cicero | Balkan Rhapsodie | |
| 15296 | Don "Sugarcane" Harris | Keep On Driving | |
| 15297 | Oscar Peterson | Walking the Line | |
| 15298 | Eddie Thompson | Piano Mood | |
| 15299 | Eddie Thompson | No Greater Love | |
| 15300 | Baden Powell | Canto on Guitar | |
| 15301 | Volker Kriegel | Spectrum | |
| 15302 | Roland Hanna | Child of Gemini | |
| 15303 | Stephane Grappelli | Afternoon in Paris | |
| 15304 | Michael Naura | Call | |
| 15305 | Don "Sugarcane" Harris | Fiddler on the Rock | |
| 15306 | Oscar Peterson | Tracks | |
| 15307 | Oscar Peterson | Another Day | |
| 15308 | Horst Jankowski | Jankowskeyboard | |
| 15309 | Dave Pike Set | Album | |
| 15311 | Jiggs Whigham | Values | |
| 15312 | Joe Venuti | The Daddy of the Violin | |
| 15313 | Friedrich Gulda | Fata Morgana | |
| 15314 | El Babaku | Live at the Jazz Galerie | |
| 15315 | Hans Koller Free Sound | Phoenix | |
| 15316 | John Taylor Trio | Decipher | |
| 15317 | Gunter Hampel | Out of New York | |
| 15318 | Oscar Peterson Trio & The Singers Unlimited | In Tune | |
| 15319 | Ira Kriss | Jazzanova | |
| 15320 | Oscar Peterson-Milt Jackson Quartet | Reunion Blues | |
| 15321 | Red Garland | The Quota | |
| 15322 | Red Garland | Auf Wiedersehn | |
| 15323 | George Duke | The Inner Source | |
| 15324 | Monty Alexander | Here Comes the Sun | |
| 15325 | Various Artists | Trombone Workshop | |
| 15326 | Various Artists | Zurich Jazz Festival | |
| 15327 | Tremble Kids | The Tremble Kids Are Back | |
| 15328 | Baden Powell | Images on Guitar | |
| 15329 | German All Stars | Live at the Domicile | |
| 15330 | Ray Nance | Huffin'n'Puffin' | |
| 15331 | Oscar Peterson | Great Connection | |
| 15332 | Bosco Petrovic's Nonconvertible All Stars | Swinging East | |
| 15333 | Don "Sugarcane" Harris | Sugar Cane's Got the Blues | |
| 15334 | Attila Zoller & Masahiko Satoh | A Path Through Haze | |
| 15335 | Various Artists | New Violin Summit | |
| 15336 | Marian McPartland | Interplay | |
| 15337 | Joachim Kühn | Solo | |
| 15338 | James Moody and Al Cohn | Too Heavy for Words | |
| 15339 | Smoke | Everything | |
| 15340 | Bora Rokovic | Ultra Native | |
| 15341 | Various Artists | USA Jazz Live: Moten Swing | |
| 15343 | Jean-Luc Ponty | Open Strings | |
| 15344 | Joachim Kühn | Interchange | |
| 15345 | Association P.C. | Sun Rotation | |
| 15346 | Joachim Kühn | Piano | |
| 15347 | The Keynotes | Get On That Gospel Train | |
| 15348 | Various Artists | USA Jazz Live: Oleo | |
| 15349 | George Duke | The Inner Source | |
| 15350 | Various Artists | USA Jazz Live: The Hymn | |
| 15352 | The MPS Rhythm Combination & Brass | My Kind of Sunshine | |
| 15354 | Charly Antolini | In the Groove | |
| 15355 | New Jazz Trio | Page Two | |
| 15356 | Wolfgang Dauner | Knirsch | |
| 15359 | Albert Mangelsdorff | Trombirds | |
| 15360 | Albert Mangelsdorff | Birds of Underground | |
| 15362 | Volker Kriegel | Inside: Missing Link | |
| 15366 | George Gruntz Concert Jazz Band | The Band: The Alpine Power Plant | |
| 15367 | Fritz Pauer | Power by Pauer | |
| 15368 | Various Artists | Nova Bossa Nova | |
| 15369 | Various Artists | From Europe with Jazz | |
| 15370 | Dave Pike & Grupo Baiafro in Bahia | Salamao | |
| 15371 | Gutesha | Rockin' Bach Dimension | |
| 15372 | Art Van Damme | Squeezing Art and Tender Flutes | |
| 15373 | Erroll Garner | Gemini | |
| 15374 | Various Artists | Heidelberger Jazztage '72 | |
| 15375 | Various Artists | We'll Remember Komeda | |
| 15376 | Earl Hines and Jaki Byard | Duet! | |
| 15377 | Monty Alexander | We've Only Just Begun | |
| 15378 | Rolf Kühn | The Day After | |
| 15379 | Rolf Kühn | Connection '74 | |
| 15380 | Association P.C. | Erna Morena | |
| 15381 | Baden Powell | Estudos | |
| 15382 | Duke Ellington with the Ron Collier Orchestra | Collages | Reissue of North of the Border in Canada |
| 15383 | Sebastião Tapajós | Bienvenido Tapajos | |
| 15384 | Friedrich Gulda | Musician of Our Time: Midlife Harvest | |
| 15385 | Jimmy Raney | Momentum | |
| 15386 | Barry Harris | Vicissitudes | |
| 15387 | Peter Herbolzheimer | Waitaminute | |
| 15388 | Joachim Kühn Trio | This Way Out | |
| 15389 | Joachim Kühn Quartett | This Way Out | |
| 15390 | Volker Kriegel | Lift! | |
| 15391 | Peter Herbolzheimer | Wide Open | |
| 15392 | Rolf Kühn | Total Space | |
| 15394/5 | Wolfgang Dauner | Et Cetera – Live | |
| 15396 | Albert Mangelsdorff | The Wide Point | |
| 15397 | Albert Mangelsdorff | Tromboneliness | |
| 15399 | Association P.C. | Rock Around the Cock | |
| 15400 | Don Ellis | Soaring | |
| 15401 | Don "Sugarcane" Harris | Cup Full of Dreams | |
| 15402 | Bill Evans | Symbiosis | |
| 15403 | Volker Kriegel | Mild Maniac | |
| 15404 | Tremble Kids | Midnight Session | |
| 15405 | Miriam Klein | Lady Like | |
| 15407 | Chris Hinze | Mission Suite | |
| 15408 | Don "Sugarcane" Harris | I'm On Your Case | |
| 15409 | Various Artists | Heidelberger Jazztage '73 | |
| 15410 | Association P.C. with Jeremy Steig | Mama Kuku | |
| 15411 | The Singers Unlimited with Art Van Damme | Invitation | |
| 15412 | Art Van Damme | Art Van Damme with Strings | |
| 15413 | Erwin Lehn | Color in Jazz | |
| 15414 | Monty Alexander | Perception | |
| 15415 | Turk Murphy | Turk Murphy's Frisco Jazz Band Live! | |
| 15416 | George Shearing | Light, Airy and Swinging | |
| 15417 | Enrico Rava | Katcharpari Rava | |
| 15418 | Don "Sugarcane" Harris | Keyzop | |
| 15419 | Don "Sugarcane" Harris | Flashin' Time | |
| 15420 | Don Ellis | Haiku | |
| 15421 | George Duke | Faces in Reflection | |
| 15422 | Hans Koller-Wolfgang Dauner | Kunstkopfindianer | |
| 15423 | Joachim Kühn | Cinemascope | |
| 15424 | Albert Mangelsdorff | Trilogue – Live! | |
| 15425 | Peter Herbolzheimer | Scenes | |
| 15426 | Erroll Garner | Magician | |
| 15427 | George Gruntz | Monster Sticksland Meeting Two: Monster Jazz | |
| 15428 | Jasper van 't Hof | Transitory | |
| 15429 | Monty Alexander | Rass! | |
| 15430 | Oscar Klein & Fatty George | Chicagoan All Stars | |
| 15431 | Csaba Deseo | Four String Tschaba | |
| 15432 | Slide Hampton-Joe Haider | Give Me a Double | |
| 15433 | George Shearing | My Ship | |
| 15434 | George Shearing | The Way We Are | |
| 15435 | George Shearing | Continental Experience | |
| 15436 | The Singers Unlimited | Sentimental Journey | |
| 15437 | Sigi Busch | The Age of Miracles | |
| 15438 | George Duke | Feel | |
| 15439 | Tremble Kids | Hats Off to Eddie Condon | |
| 15440 | Ernest Ranglin | Ranglypso | |
| 15441 | Monty Alexander | Love and Sunshine | |
| 15442 | Various Artists | From Europe with Jazz Vol. 2 | |
| 15443 | Baden Powell | Apaixonado | |
| 15444 | Hannibal and the Sunrise Orchestra | Hannibal | |
| 15445 | Stephane Grappelli & The Diz Disley Trio | Violinspiration | |
| 15446 | George Shearing | The Many Facets of George Shearing | |
| 15447 | Martial Solal | Nothing But Piano | |
| 15448 | George Duke | The Aura Will Prevail | |
| 15449 | Frank Rosolino-Conte Candoli | Conversation | |
| 15450 | Rolf Kühn Orchestra | Symphonic Swampfire | |
| 15451 | Rolf Kühn | Cucu Ear | |
| 15452 | Monty Alexander | Unlimited Love | |
| 15453 | Monty Alexander | Fly Right | |
| 15454 | Clark Terry | Wham! | |
| 15455 | John Handy and Ali Akbar Khan | Karuna Supreme | |
| 15456 | Dieter Reith | Knock Out | |
| 15457 | Albert Mangelsdorff | Solo Now | |
| 15458 | Yōsuke Yamashita Trio | Chiasma | |
| 15459 | George Duke | I Love the Blues, She Heard My Cry | |
| 15460 | Tremble Kids | The Other Way Around | |
| 15461 | Hans Koller-Wolfgang Dauner | Free Sound & Super Brass | |
| 15462 | George Gruntz Piano Conclave | Palais Anthology | |
| 15463 | Francy Boland | The Orchestra 1. Blue Flame | |
| 15464 | Francy Boland | The Orchestra 2. Red Hot | |
| 15465 | Francy Boland | The Orchestra 3. White Heat | |
| 15466 | Joachim Kühn featuring Alphonse Mouzon | Hip Elegy | |
| 15467 | Frank Rosolino-Conte Candoli | Just Friends | |
| 15468 | Frank Rosolino-Conte Candoli | Westcoasting | |
| 15469 | Lionel Hampton with Milt Buckner | Alive and Jumping | |
| 15470 | Hans van der Sys | It's Rag Time | |
| 15471 | Volker Kriegel | Tropical Harvest | |
| 15472 | Various Artists | Chicago Jazz Giants Live! | |
| 15473 | Les Brown & His Band of Renown | Today | |
| 15474 | George Duke | Liberated Fantasies | |
| 15475 | George Gruntz Concert Jazz Band | The Band Recorded Live | |
| 15476 | Martial Solal | Movability | |
| 15477 | Erroll Garner | Erroll Garner Plays Gershwin & Kern | |
| 15478 | Hans Koller | Freesound for Marcel Duchamp | |
| 15479 | Various Artists | The Historic Donaueschingen Jazz Conzert 1957 | |
| 15480 | Clare Fischer | Clare Declares | |
| 15481 | Jasper van 't Hof's Pork Pie | The Door is Open | |
| 15482 | George Shearing Trio & Stephane Grappelli | The Reunion | |
| 15483 | Charlie Mariano | Helen 12 Trees | |
| 15484 | Monty Alexander | The Way It Is | |
| 15487 | Willem Breuker Kollektief | Live at the Donaueschingen Music Festival: The European Scene | |
| 15488 | George Shearing | Windows | |
| 15489 | Zbigniew Seifert | Man of the Light | |
| 15490 | Jasper van 't Hof | The Selfkicker | |
| 15491 | Supersax | Chasin' the Bird | |
| 15492 | Supersax | Dynamite | |
| 15493 | Monty Alexander | Montreux Alexander Live! | |
| 15494 | George Duke | The Dream | |
| 15495 | Volker Kriegel & Mild Maniac Orchestra | Octember Variations | |
| 15496 | Hannibal | Hannibal in Berlin | |
| 15497 | Martial Solal | Suite for Trio | |
| 15498 | Alphonse Mouzon | Virtue | |
| 15499 | Michał Urbaniak's Fusion | Smiles Ahead | |
| 15500 | Clare Fischer | Alone Together | |
| 15501 | Mumps | A Matter of Taste | |
| 15502 | Monty Alexander | Estade | |
| 15503 | George Gruntz | For Flying Out Proud | |
| 15504 | George Shearing | 500 Miles High | |
| 15505 | Cecil Taylor | Live in the Black Forest | |
| 15506 | Hank Jones | Have You Met This Jones? | |
| 15507 | George Shearing | Feeling Happy | |
| 15508 | Rimona Francis | Rimona Francis | |
| 15509 | Patrick Williams | Come On and Shine | |
| 15510 | Stephane Grappelli | Young Django | |
| 15511 | Gene Bertoncini with Michael Moore | Bridges | |
| 15512 | Michał Urbaniak's Fusion | Heritage | |
| 15513 | Jasper van 't Hof | However | |
| 15514 | Jasper van 't Hof | Flowers Allover | |
| 15515 | Hans Koller – The Big Band | New York City | |
| 15516 | Clark Terry | Clark After Dark | |
| 15517 | Volker Kriegel & Mild Maniac Orchestra | Elastic Menu | |
| 15518 | Monty Alexander featuring Ernest Ranglin | Cobilimbo | |
| 15519 | Stu Goldberg | Solos-Duos-Trios | |
| 15520 | Alphonse Mouzon | In Search of a Dream | |
| 15521 | Fatty George Chicago Jazz Band | Fatty '78 | |
| 15522 | Fritz Pauer | Blues Inside Out | |
| 15523 | Elvin Jones Jazz Machine | Remembrance | |
| 15524 | Ryo Kawasaki Group | Nature's Revenge | |
| 15525 | Martial Solal | The Solosolal | |
| 15526 | JoAnne Brackeen | Mythical Magic | |
| 15527 | Joanne Grauer | Joanne Grauer Introducing Lorraine Feather | |
| 15528 | Albert Mangelsdorff | A Jazz Tune I Hope | |
| 15529 | Edgar Wilson | Goin' Straight | |
| 15531 | George Gruntz Concert Jazz Band | GG-CJB | |
| 15532 | Alphonse Mouzon | Baby Come Back | |
| 15533 | Martial Solal, Lee Konitz, John Scofield & Niels-Henning Ørsted Pedersen | Four Keys | |
| 15534 | Martial Solal | Piano Solo | |
| 15535 | Volker Kriegel | House Boat | |
| 15536 | Jasper van 't Hof-George Gruntz | Fairy Tale | |
| 15537 | George Shearing | Getting in the Swing of Things | |
| 15539 | Clare Fischer | Salsa Picante | |
| 15540 | Various Artists | Vibes Summit | |
| 15541 | Joe Henderson | Mirror Mirror | |
| 15542 | Werner Baumgart's Big Band | Baden-Baden Jazz Rock & Sweet | |
| 15543 | Frederic Rabold Crew | Funky Tango | |
| 15544 | Alphonse Mouzon | By All Means | |
| 15545 | Billy Harper Quintet | Trying to Make Heaven My Home | |
| 15546 | Didier Lockwood | New World | |
| 15547 | Jasper van 't Hof | Live in Montreux | |
| 15548 | The Gypsy Jazz Violin Summit | The Gypsy Jazz Violin Summit | |
| 15549 | Volker Kriegel & Mild Maniac Orchestra | Long Distance | |
| 15550 | Karl Berger | Woodstock Workshop Orchestra Live at the Donaueschingen Festival | |
| 15551 | George Shearing | On Target | |
| 15552 | Rob McConnell & The Boss Brass | Present Perfect | |
| 15553 | Gordon Beck | Seven Steps to Evans | |
| 15554 | Clare Fischer | Machaca | |
| 15555 | Clare Fischer | Clare Fischer and Ex-42 | |
| 15556 | Albert Mangelsdorff | Solo | |
| 15557 | Clarinet Summit | You Better Fly Away | |
| 15558 | Stu Goldberg | Piano Solo: Piru | |
| 15559 | Mauricio Einhorn | Me | |
| 15560 | Bob Malach | Some People | |
| 15562 | Anthony Davis & Jay Hoggard | Under the Double Moon | |
| 15563 | The String Summit | One World in Eight | |
| 15564 | Charly Antonlini | Special Delivery | |
| 15565 | Kai Winding, Albert Mangelsdorff, Bill Watrous & Jiggs Whigham | Trombone Summit | |
| 15566 | Zipflo Reinhardt Group | Light of the Future | |
| 15568 | Didier Lockwood Group | Live in Montreux | |
| 15569 | Volker Kriegel & Mild Maniac Orchestra | Live in Bayern | |
| 15570 | Monty Alexander and Ernest Ranglin | Monty Alexander-Ernest Ranglin | |
| 15571 | Mel Lewis & The Jazz Orchestra | Live in Montreux | |
| 15572 | Albert Mangelsdorff | Albert Live in Montreux | |
| 15573 | Foreign Exchange | The First Album | |
| 15574 | Rob McConnell & The Boss Brass | Tribute | |
| 15575 | Cecil Taylor | Fly! Fly! Fly! Fly! Fly! | |
| 15576 | John Handy, Ali Akbar Khan and Dr. L. Subramaniam | Rainbow | |
| 15577 | Lee Konitz & Martial Solal | Duo: Live at Berlin Jazz Days '80 | |
| 15578 | John Ward | Talkin' to Each Other | |
| 15579 | Tommy Tedesco | When Do We Start | |
| 15580 | Tommy Tedesco | Autumn | |
| 15581 | Masahiko Togashi | Minamoto | |
| 15582 | Didier Lockwood | Fasten Seat Belts | |
| 15583 | Freddie Hubbard | Rollin' | |
| 15584 | Albert Mangelsdorff | Triple Entente | |
| 15585 | Stu Goldberg | Eye of the Beholder | |
| 15586 | Wolfgang Schlüter-Christoph Spendel | Dualism | |
| 15587 | Frank Loef-Gerd Wilden | Just Fun | |
| 15588 | Didier Lockwood | The Kid | |
| 15589 | Stu Goldberg | Stu Goldberg – Live | |
| 15590 | Jasper van 't Hof-Joachim Kühn | Balloons | |
| 15591 | Dieter Goal featuring the Monty Alexander Trio | Goal | |
| 15592 | Christoph Spendel & Wolfgang Schlüter Group | September Memories | |
| 15593 | Monty Alexander | The Duke Ellington Songbook | |
| 15594 | Hank Jones + Tommy Flanagan | I'm All Smiles | |
| 15595 | Albert Mangelsdorff-Lee Konitz | Art of the Duo | |
