= Pausa Records =

American jazz record label (c. 1975–1986)

Pausa Records was an American record label, active circa 1975–1986, which mainly issued jazz albums.

The company's name came from the fact that it was from the United States division of the Italian record company Produttori Associati (PA-USA). In Italy, Produttori Associati was best known for soundtrack albums of Italian films. The label also released a few recordings by Italian progressive rock artists such as Maxophone. Many of its releases were reissues of MPS Records recordings.

In 1990, the label lost a $4 million lawsuit for failure to pay royalties.

== Discography ==
- PR 7001 Cappuccino / Making Love / Banana Boat (7", Promo)
- PR 7002 Maxophone / Maxophone
- PR 7003 Gian Piero Reverberi / Reverberi
- PR 7007 Santo & Johnny / Disco D'Oro (Stereo)
- PR 7010 Gerry Mulligan, Enrico Intra, Pino Presti, Tullio De Piscopo, Giancarlo Barigozzi, Sergio Farina / Gerry Mulligan meets Enrico Intra
- PR 7014 Giorgio Gaslini Meets Jean-Luc Ponty
- PR 7015 Sam Rivers / The Quest
- PR 7016 Gian Piero Reverberi / Timer
- PR 7017 Randy Weston / Randy Weston
- PR 7019 Lee Konitz and Warne Marsh / Lee Konitz Meets Warne Marsh Again
- PR 7020 Gian Piero Reverberi / Stairway To Heaven
- PR 7020 Shelly Manne, Frank Strazzeri, Steve Wilkerson, Dave Stone, Woody James / Woody James Presents Jazz Crystallizations
- PR 7022 The Jazz Wave / Muses For Richard Davis
- PR 7023 Mark Murphy / Midnight Mood
- PR 7028 Don Ellis / Soaring
- PR 7031 Rob McConnell & The Boss Brass / The Jazz
- PR 7041 Stephane Grappelli / Young Django
- PR 7044 Oscar Peterson / Mellow Mood
- PR 7048 Singers Unlimited / Just In Time
- PR 7059 Oscar Peterson / Action
- PR 7060 Patrick Williams / Theme
- PR 7063 Eddie "Lockjaw" Davis - Johnny Griffin Quintet / Tough Tenors Again 'N' Again
- PR 7067 Rob McConnell & The Boss Brass / Present Perfect
- PR 7068 Singers Unlimited, Featuring Pat Williams Orchestra / Feeling Free
- PR 7076 Singers Unlimited / A Capella III
- PR 7078 Baden Powell de Aquino (credited as Baden Powell) / Tristeza On Guitar
- PR 7080 Oscar Peterson / The Way I Really Play
- PR 7085 Oscar Peterson / Hello Herbie
- PR 7086 Clare Fischer / 2+2
- PR 7087 Alphonse Mouzon / By All Means
- PR 7089 Various / Berlin Festival Guitar Workshop
- PR 7091 Albert Mangelsdorff / Hamburger Idylle
- PR 7093 Hi-Lo's / Now
- PR 7094 Didier Lockwood / Live in Montreux
- PR 7100 Singers Unlimited, The / A Capella I
- PR 7102 Oscar Peterson / Motions and Emotions
- PR 7103 Martial Solal, Niels Henning Ørsted-Pedersen / Movability
- PR 7106 Rob McConnell & The Boss Brass / Tribute
- PR 7107 Alphonse Mouzon / Morning Sun
- PR 7110 Monty Alexander & Ernest Ranglin / Just Friends
- PR 7114 Michał Urbaniak / Daybreak
- PR 7119 Oscar Peterson / Tracks
- PR 7127 Nightwind / A Casual Romance
- PR 7128 Ollie Mitchell's Sunday Band / Blast Off
- PR 7134 Jiggs Whigham / Hope
- PR 7137 Boy Katindig / Midnight Lady
- PR 7140 Rob McConnell & The Boss Brass / Big Band Jazz, Volume 1
- PR 7141 Rob McConnell & The Boss Brass / Big Band Jazz, Volume 2
- PR 7142 Dan Siegel / Reflections
- PR 7143 Pete Petersen & The Collection Jazz Orchestra, Featuring Ashley Alexander, Rich Matteson, Phil Wilson / Texas State Of Mind
- PR 7145 Tom Grant / Tom Grant
- PR 7146 Don Latarski / Lifeline (12", EP)
- PR 7147 Judy Roberts/Jeff Hamilton/Ray Brown / Trio
- PR 7149 Rob McConnell & The Boss Brass / Again! (Volume 2)
- PR 7150 Grant Geissman / Put Away Childish Toys
- PR 7151 Art Van Damme / Art Van Damme And Friends
- PR 7153 Steve Narahara / Sierra
- PR 7154 Julie Kelly / We're On Our Way
- PR 7155 Various / Collage
- PR 7156 Made In Brasil / Tudo Joia
- PR 7157 Willie Dixon / Mighty Earthquake And Hurricane
- PR 7158 Billy Mitchell / Blue City Jam
- PR 7160 Louis Bellson And Explosion / Louis Bellson And Explosion
- PR 7161 Puttin' On The Ritz / Steppin' Out
- PR 7162 Tom Grant / Heart Of The City
- PR 7163 Pete Petersen & The Collection Jazz Orchestra, Featuring Ashley Alexander / Jazz Journey
- PR 7164 Dan Siegel Featuring Pat O'Hearn & Alex Acuña / Another Time, Another Place
- PR 7165 Laurel Massé / Alone Together
- PR 7167 Louie Bellson, Ray Brown, Paul Smith / Intensive Care
- PR 7168 ReCoil / The Fantasy Continues
- PR 7169 Ira Sullivan / Strings Attached
- PR 7171 Bobby Shew / Breakfast Wine
- PR 7172 Paul Smith / Paul Smith Plays Steve Allen
- PR 7173 Alphonse Mouzon / The Sky Is The Limit
- PR 7174 Tom Grant / Just The Right Moment
- PR 7175 Susannah McCorkle / Thanks for the Memory: Songs of Leo Robin
- PR 7176 Judy Roberts / You Are There
- PR 7177 Steve Narahara / Odyssey
- PR 7178 The Ashley Alexander Big Band / Power Slide
- PR 7179 Dan Siegel / On The Edge
- PR 7180 Bill Holman, Charlie Shoemake / Collaboration
- PR 7182 Alphonse Mouzon & Larry Coryell / The 11th House
- PR 7183 Willie Dixon / Live (Backstage Access)
- PR 7186 Julie Kelly / Never Let Me Go
- PR 7188 Ted Shumate / Gulfstream
- PR 7196 Alphonse Mouzon Band / Back To Jazz
- PR 7199 Tom Grant / Take Me To Your Dream
- PR 7201 Rod Piazza & The Mighty Flyers / From The Start To The Finnish
- PR 7205 Wishful Thinking / Think Again
- PR 9001 Jean-Luc Ponty Experience with the George Duke Trio
- PR 9006 Hoagy Carmichael / Hoagy Sings Carmichael
- PR 9021 The George Shearing Quintet With Nancy Wilson / The Swingin's Mutual!
- PR 9028 Supersax / Salt Peanuts
- PR 9037 Harry James / More Harry James In Hi-Fi
- PR 9058 Jimmy Giuffre / Tangents In Jazz
- PR 9059 Laurindo Almeida / Broadway Solo Guitar
- PR 9064 June Christy / Recalls Those Kenton Days
