= Exclusively for My Friends: The Lost Tapes =

Studio album by Oscar Peterson
- Released: 1995
- Recorded: 1965 and 1967–1968
- Studio: Hans Georg Brunner-Schwer Studio, Villingen, West Germany
- Genre: Jazz
- Length: 75:03
- Label: Verve

Oscar Peterson chronology
| Soul Español (1966) | Exclusively for My Friends: The Lost Tapes (1995) | Action (1968) |

Exclusively for My Friends: Lost Tapes is a 1995 studio album by jazz pianist Oscar Peterson, part of his Exclusively for My Friends series.

== Reception ==
Professional ratings
Review scores
| Source | Rating |
|---|---|
| AllMusic | 2.5/5 stars |

Writing for AllMusic, critic Scott Yanow wrote "The emphasis throughout is on O.P.'s virtuosity and melodic improvisations. Although the release does not add anything surprising to Peterson's legacy, his playing is up to the level of his other sets of the period"

== Track listing ==
1. "Gravy Waltz" (Steve Allen, Ray Brown) – 3:19
2. "Three O'Clock in the Morning" (Julian Robledo, Dorothy Terriss) – 8:45
3. "Squeaky's Blues" (Oscar Peterson) – 7:28
4. "Tenderly" (Walter Gross, Jack Lawrence) – 11:06
5. "I Will Wait for You" (Jacques Demy, Norman Gimbel, Michel Legrand) – 6:53
6. "Let's Fall in Love" (Harold Arlen, Ted Koehler) – 4:28
7. "Put On a Happy Face" (Lee Adams, Charles Strouse) – 6:34
8. "Stella by Starlight" (Ned Washington, Victor Young) – 5:15
9. "Moanin'" (Bobby Timmons) – 5:38
10. "Never Say Yes" (Doc Pomus, Mort Shuman) – 5:22
11. "It's Impossible" (Peterson) – 6:55
12. "My Romance" (Lorenz Hart, Richard Rodgers) – 3:57

== Personnel ==
- Oscar Peterson – piano,
- Ray Brown (tracks 1–4), Sam Jones (tracks 5–12) – bass
- Ed Thigpen (tracks 1–4), Bobby Durham (tracks 5–12) – drums
