= Collective (Star Trek: Voyager) =

- Star Trek: Voyager episode
- Episode no.: Season 6 Episode 16
- Directed by: Allison Liddi
- Story by: Andrew Shepard Price; Mark Gaberman
- Teleplay by: Michael Taylor
- Production code: 235
- Original air date: February 16, 2000

Guest appearances
- Manu Intiraymi - Icheb; Marley S. McClean - Mezoti; Kurt Wetherill - Azan; Cody Wetherill - Rebi; Ryan Spahn - First

Episode chronology
← Previous "Tsunkatse"	Next → "Spirit Folk"
- Star Trek: Voyager season 6

"Collective" is the 136th episode of Star Trek: Voyager, the 16th episode of the sixth season.

Chakotay, Harry Kim, Tom Paris and Neelix are taken hostage when the Delta Flyer is captured by a Borg cube. However, the cube is littered with dead drones and controlled solely by a small group of unmatured Borg children who were left behind, unworthy of re-assimilation. The underdeveloped drones attempt to assimilate their captives, while Captain Janeway sends Seven of Nine to negotiate.

== Plot ==
During an away mission, the Delta Flyer is intercepted by a Borg cube. Chakotay, Paris and Neelix find themselves in what appears to be an assimilation chamber. A partially assimilated body with crude Borg implants lies on a table in the center of the room. Harry Kim, who was knocked unconscious during the initial encounter, is still aboard the Delta Flyer, which is inside the Borg cube.

Voyager locates the Delta Flyer and the disabled Borg cube. The Borg's erratic attack strategy allows Voyager to disable the cube's weapons array, and Seven detects only five Borg signatures aboard the cube. The Borg agree to return the captured crew members in exchange for Voyager's navigational deflector, which would leave Voyager without warp propulsion. Seven surmises the Borg want the deflector to contact the Collective.

While stalling the Borg, Janeway sends Seven to their ship to confirm that the captured crew members are unharmed. Seven discovers the drones aboard the cube are all dead, except for five children, who believe the Borg will rescue them once their link is re-established. Seven returns to Voyager with a dead adult drone. The Doctor discovers that a space-borne virus killed it. The immature drones were unaffected by the virus because they were protected while inside the maturation chambers. Mechanical malfunctions later opened their chambers prematurely. The Doctor also discovers that if the pathogen is revived, it could be used to neutralize the drone children. Janeway considers weaponizing the virus against other Borg, an idea the Doctor opposes.

Because Voyager cannot give up its deflector, Janeway offers Seven's technical services in repairing the cube's technology. A Borg child threatens Janeway, saying the repairs must be completed in two hours or else a hostage will be killed. Meanwhile, Kim regains consciousness inside the Delta Flyer and contacts Voyager. Seven attempts to break the Borg children away from the Collective and persuade them to join Voyager's crew.

While working on the cube's repairs, Seven discovers that the Collective deliberately ignored the drones' distress call, considering them irrelevant and damaged. Their link to the Collective was permanently severed. The drone children were unable to decrypt the Collective's reply that they were unworthy of re-assimilation. Meanwhile, Kim is captured and awakens to raw-looking implants on his face. "First" (the unnamed leader of the Borg children played by Ryan Spahn) grows frustrated and demands that Voyager turn over their deflector immediately. Seven tells the drone children that the Collective will never return for them and that their distress call was purposely ignored.

Voyager successfully beams Chakotay, Paris and Neelix back onto Voyager, but Seven and Kim are held in a shielded area. Angered, First violently attacks Seven, but his Second pulls him away. As the cube's transwarp core destabilizes, Seven orders evacuation. However, First refuses to leave and is lethally shocked and knocked off his feet. Seven comforts him as he dies, though he remains defiant, proclaiming, "We are Borg."

Back aboard Voyager, the Doctor successfully removes Kim's and the children's Borg implants. Seven partially salvages the cube's database, including the surviving children's original assimilation profiles. The children discover their real names are Icheb, Mezoti, Azan, and Rebi.

== Reception ==
Seven of Nine is one of the highest rated characters of the franchise and sometimes surpasses the captain in reviews. SyFy recommend this episode for their Seven of Nine binge-watching guide.

Regarding the Borg, Space.com rated the Borg cube, which is featured in interior and exterior shots in this episode, the overall 2nd best spacecraft of Star Trek. TrekToday noted this episode for featuring a Borg baby. In 2020, SyFy Wire ranked "Collective" as one of the seven essential episodes about Borg to watch as background for Star Trek: Picard.

Gizmodo ranked this one of the "must watch" episodes from the series.

== Fate of the Borg children ==
In 2000, the episode's producers were asked what happened to the Borg baby in the episode in an interview. They state "... The baby was returned to its people, which you did not see depicted in an episode. We considered showing it onscreen, but decided it would be best to focus on the remaining Borg kids. .."

The four other children are later featured in the episode "Ashes to Ashes".

This episode marks the introduction of ex-Borg teenager Icheb, who would become a recurring character on the television show for the remainder of the show's run, appearing in 11 episodes in all. Icheb would appear for a final time in a flashback sequence in the season one episode of Star Trek: Picard "Stardust City Rag."

== Releases ==
This episode was released as part of a season 6 DVD boxset on December 7, 2004.

== See also ==
- "Q Who?" - the Borg debut in the Star Trek franchise (May 1989)
- "Child's Play" - explains what killed the drones aboard the cube in "Collective"
