= The Fight (Star Trek: Voyager) =

- Star Trek: Voyager episode
- Episode no.: Season 5 Episode 19
- Directed by: Winrich Kolbe
- Story by: Michael Taylor
- Teleplay by: Joe Menosky
- Production code: 208
- Original air date: March 24, 1999

Guest appearances
- Ray Walston - Boothby; Carlos Palomino - The Boxer; Ned Romero - Chakotay's Grandfather

Episode chronology
← Previous "Course: Oblivion"	Next → "Think Tank"
- Star Trek: Voyager season 5

"The Fight" is the 113th episode of the science fiction television series Star Trek: Voyager, the 19th episode of the fifth season. It aired on UPN on March 24, 1999.

"The Fight" is noted for its use of one of Voyager's common themes, which is the crewmembers' hobbies; in this case First Officer Chakotay's interest in boxing. Guest stars include Ray Walston reprising the character Boothby, Ned Romero as Chakotay's Grandfather and Carlos Palomino as the Alien Boxer. However, the episode is heavily dream sequence based so the characters are mostly visions within Chakotay's mind or possibly symbolic.

== Plot ==
Chakotay is in sickbay, struggling to communicate with aliens through a vision quest. Through flashbacks, we learn of the events leading up to this scene. Chakotay is in a holodeck boxing simulation, with Boothby (Note: Ray Walston plays Boothby, the Starfleet Academy head groundskeeper introduced to the Star Trek franchise in the 1992 Star Trek: The Next Generation episode "The First Duty".) as his trainer, facing an alien opponent (Note: Former World Welterweight Champion Carlos Palomino plays the Alien Boxer, and also served as the episode's boxing consultant.) who knocks him out. Shortly after, Voyager is pulled into chaotic space, an area where the laws of physics are in a constant state of flux. Seven of Nine warns that this type of space can easily destroy the ship due to changes in the gravitational coefficient. Chakotay begins to hallucinate, seeing his boxing gloves at various locations on the ship as well as hearing voices. He is taken to sickbay after attempting to fight Tuvok on the bridge.

The Doctor detects a genetic marker for a cognitive disorder in Chakotay, surmising that this is responsible for his hallucinations. Voyager finds another ship in the chaotic space, along with information that some of that crew was also hallucinating, suggesting that Chakotay's hallucinations may be induced by chaotic space.

Chakotay decides to go on a vision quest, hoping to learn more about his hallucinations. There he sees his grandfather, who had the cognitive disorder that has been reactivated in Chakotay. He becomes increasingly confused when the vision quest becomes a boxing match that he cannot leave.

He is awakened by the Doctor, where he realizes that aliens were attempting to communicate with him through his vision quest. He struggles to communicate this clearly to the Captain and the Doctor, as he continues to slip in and out of reality, returning to the boxing match again and again, as his mind had latched onto the boxing holo-program he had recently participated in. Chakotay fears he is endangering his sanity and safety, but decides going back into the vision quest is the only way to make first contact. He finally accepts a confrontation with his "boxing opponent." The alien sends information on how to escape, using the voices and words of the crew. Chakotay, back on his feet, manually adjusts the ship, being unable to actually explain it to Kim or the others.

After the ship is safe, Chakotay is given some time off, which he uses to further continue his boxing holo-program.

== Reception ==
The episode is noted for being "atmospheric" and its development of the Chakotay character. However, a Star Trek binge-watch guide by W.I.R.E.D. magazine put "The Fight" on its recommended skips, and in 2011 it was rated among the worst episodes of Star Trek: Voyager. In 2017, it was ranked among the top 15 worst of all Star Trek television episodes by Screen Rant, and in 2018, it was placed as the 18th worst Star Trek episode by Comic Book Resources. Chakotay was ranked as the 34th best character in 2018, but was ranked the 12th worst Star Trek character in 2016.

In 2019, Screen Rant ranked "The Fight" as one of the five worst Star Trek: Voyager episodes, (Note: The other four "worst" Star Trek: Voyager episodes on Screen Rant's list are "Fair Haven", "Spirit Folk", "Favorite Son" and "Threshold".) claiming that "the character of Chakotay never really had a place to be in the show".

In 2020, Screen Rant noted an IMDb rating of 5.2 out 10, edging out "Threshold" to be the lowest rated Star Trek: Voyager episode.

In 2020, The Digital Fix said this was the worst episode in season five, and "one of the worst episodes the show ever made" remarking, "Skip at all costs."

== Releases ==
"The Fight" was released on LaserDisc in Japan on June 22, 2001, as part of 5th Season vol.2, which included episodes from "Dark Frontier" to "Equinox, Part I". The episode had two audio tracks, English and Japanese. This set had 6 double sided 12" optical discs giving a total runtime of 552 minutes.

It was also released on VHS paired with "Think Tank".
