= Bird (1988 film) =

1988 biographical film by Clint Eastwood

- Theatrical release poster by Bill Gold
- Directed by: Clint Eastwood
- Written by: Joel Oliansky
- Produced by: Clint Eastwood
- Starring: Forest Whitaker; Diane Venora
- Cinematography: Jack N. Green
- Edited by: Joel Cox
- Music by: Lennie Niehaus
- Production company: Malpaso Productions
- Distributed by: Warner Bros.
- Release dates: May 21, 1988 (Cannes); September 30, 1988 (United States)
- Running time: 161 minutes
- Country: United States
- Language: English
- Budget: $9–14 million
- Box office: $2 million

Bird is a 1988 American biographical musical drama film about jazz saxophonist Charlie "Bird" Parker, directed and produced by Clint Eastwood and written by Joel Oliansky. The film stars Forest Whitaker as Parker, and Diane Venora as his wife Chan Parker. It is constructed as a montage of scenes from Parker's life, from his childhood in Kansas City, through his early death at the age of 34.

The film moves back and forth through Parker's history, blending moments to find some truth to his life. Much of the film revolves around his only grounding relationships with Chan, Bebop pioneer trumpet player and band leader Dizzy Gillespie (Samuel E. Wright), and his influence (both musically and into the world of heroin addiction) on trumpet player Red Rodney (Michael Zelniker).

Despite a lukewarm commercial performance, the film was well received by critics, with particular praise toward Whitaker's performance, which became his breakthrough role. He won the Best Actor Award at the 1988 Cannes Film Festival and was nominated for Best Actor – Motion Picture Drama at the 46th Golden Globe Awards, while Eastwood won the award for Best Director. Cahiers du Cinéma ranked Bird at #5 on its end-of-year Top 10 List.

== Plot ==
In 1939, Kansas City, Missouri, young alto saxophone player Charlie "Bird" Parker performs at the Reno Club. However, his rapid and sporadic playing gets him jeered offstage. Moving to New York City, Charlie begins performing at different jazz venues on 52nd Street and meets trumpeter Dizzy Gillespie. While Charlie performs with Dizzy, their specific style of jazz develops a following and is known as "bebop."

One evening, Charlie meets Chan Parker, a dancer and jazz lover. Attracted to Chan, Charlie continually asks her out, but she refuses his advances and moves to Chicago, Illinois. Later, Chan returns from Chicago and confesses she is pregnant with another man's child. Upset, Charlie leaves for Los Angeles, California, to perform with Dizzy. One evening, Red Rodney, a Jewish trumpet player, approaches Charlie and tells him he is a fan. Later, Charlie and Dizzy's engagement is cancelled due to a lack of interest in bebop. Charlie stays in Los Angeles, but his addiction to drugs and alcohol worsen, and he is hospitalized for eight months.

After Charlie gets clean and is released, Chan obtains a booking at a New York club for him. When he thanks Chan for her help, she introduces him to her daughter, Kim. Later, Charlie learns that his friend, Brewster, is opening a new club and naming it Birdland after Charlie. In need of work and money, Charlie travels to Paris, France, and finds an audience for jazz and bebop. However, he returns to New York and performs at Birdland.

Charlie later meets with Red and, while waiting for Birdland to open, offers a job touring with him in the South. Although Red is hesitant about how an interracial band might be received, Charlie assures him no harm will come to them. Arriving at their first engagement, Red sees Charlie has advertised him as being a blues singer named "Albino Red." During the tour, Charlie learns that Red is addicted to heroin and insists that he stop using drugs.

Returning to New York, Charlie and Red perform together for Birdland's grand opening. Afterward, authorities pick up Red for drug possession. Charlie continues to perform at Birdland and other New York clubs. Chan and Kim move in with Charlie, and he and Chan have two children of their own: son Baird, and daughter Pree.

Some time later, Charlie is arrested for drug possession and put on probation. He loses his cabaret card, leaving him unable to perform in New York, and moves to Los Angeles in order to find work. He reconnects with Dizzy, who sees that he is using drugs again. Charlie later learns that Pree has died from an illness and returns home for her funeral. Depressed by Pree's death and his faltering career, Charlie tries to kill himself by drinking iodine, but survives. After Chan has him committed to a hospital psychiatric ward, she is advised to send Charlie to a state facility for shock treatments. She worries that such treatments might rob him of his creative abilities. After Charlie is released, Chan convinces him to move their family to upstate New York.

Charlie later returns to the city for an audition set up by Brewster, but becomes distracted seeing all the former jazz clubs on 52nd Street have been turned into strip clubs. Missing the audition and embarrassed to tell Chan, Charlie goes to the apartment of Baroness Nica, a wealthy jazz music patron, and soon passes out. A doctor arrives and advises Charlie to go to the hospital, but he refuses. Later as he watches television with the Baroness, Charlie suffers a heart attack and dies at the age of 34.

== Cast ==
- Forest Whitaker as Charlie "Bird" Parker
  - Damon Whitaker as young Bird
- Diane Venora as Chan Parker
- Michael Zelniker as Red Rodney
- Samuel E. Wright as Dizzy Gillespie
- Keith David as Buster Franklin (based on Buster Smith)
- Diane Salinger as Baroness Nica de Koenigswarter
- Michael McGuire as Brewster
- James Handy as Esteves
- Anna Thomson as Audrey
- Arlen Dean Snyder as Dr. Heath
- Sam Robards as Moscowitz
- Bill Cobbs as Dr. Caulfield
- Tony Cox as Pee Wee Marquette
- Hamilton Camp as Mayor of 52nd Street
- John Witherspoon as Sid
- Tony Todd as Frog
- Billy Mitchell as Prince
- Jason Bernard as Benny Tate
- Richard McKenzie as Southern Doctor
- Tim Russ as Harris
- Richard Jeni as Morello
- Don Starr as Nica's Doctor

== Development ==
In the 1970s, Parker's friend and colleague Teddy Edwards shared his reminiscences of the saxophonist to Joel Oliansky, who had wanted to make a biopic about Charlie Parker starring actor Richard Pryor. The property was originally owned by Columbia Pictures, which traded the rights to Warner Bros. at Eastwood's instigation, in exchange for the rights to what would become Columbia's 1990 Kevin Costner vehicle, Revenge. There was a delay of a few years while the trade was completed, and by then Pryor had lost interest—nevertheless, Eastwood dismissed Pryor's involvement since the director would have felt obligated to include "gags" (in the screen story), to satisfy audiences' expectations. The film was eventually shot in 52 days for $14.4 million, not counting Eastwood's fee, although in interviews Eastwood sometimes said the film only cost $9 million to make.

Eastwood, a lifelong fan of jazz, had been fascinated by Parker ever since seeing him perform live in Oakland in 1946. He approached Chan Parker, Bird's common-law wife on whose memoirs the script was based, for input, and she lent Eastwood and arranger Lennie Niehaus a collection of recordings from her private collection.

== Production ==
Locations used for filming include New York City, Los Angeles, Pasadena, and the Sacramento Valley.

== Music ==
Initially, when Columbia owned the project, the studio executives wanted to hire musicians to re-record all of Parker's music, largely because the original recordings were in mono, and were not of acceptable sound quality to accompany a feature film. Eastwood had some recordings of Parker made by Parker's wife, Chan, from which he had a sound engineer electronically isolate Parker's solos. Musicians were hired to record backing tracks on modern equiment, including Ray Brown, Walter Davis Jr., Charles McPherson, Ron Carter, Barry Harris, Pete Jolly and Red Rodney. Parker's musical partner Dizzy Gillespie was still alive but on tour at the time of these modern recordings, so trumpet player Jon Faddis was hired to record Gillespie's parts.

=== Soundtrack ===
Track listing
No.	Title	Writer(s)	Length
1.	"Lester Leaps In"	Lester Young	4:51
2.	"I Can't Believe That You're in Love with Me"	Jimmy McHugh; Clarence Gaskill	4:28
3.	"Laura"	David Raksin; Johnny Mercer	3:43
4.	"All of Me"	Gerald Marks; Seymour Simons	3:38
5.	"This Time the Dream's on Me"	Harold Arlen; Johnny Mercer	3:46
6.	"Ko Ko"	Charlie Parker	4:22
7.	"Cool Blues"	Charlie Parker	2:19
8.	"April in Paris"	Vernon Duke; Edgar Yipsel Harburg	3:20
9.	"Now's the Time"	Charlie Parker	3:22
10.	"Ornithology"	Charlie Parker; Benny Harris	4:55
11.	"Parker's Mood"	Charlie Parker	3:09
Total length:			41:54

== Reception ==
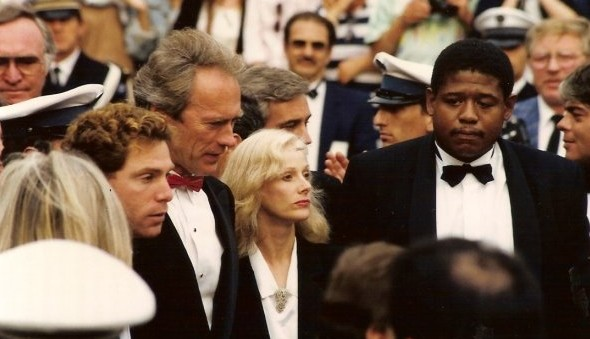
Clint Eastwood with actors Michael Zelniker and Forest Whitaker, and then-partner Sondra Locke, promoting the film at the 1988 Cannes Film Festival.

Bird received a positive reception from critics. On the review aggregator website Rotten Tomatoes, 81% of 26 critics' reviews are positive, with an average rating of 6.6/10. The website's consensus reads: "Forest Whitaker inhabits Charlie Parker with aplomb in this moving love letter to the music icon, told by director Clint Eastwood with a moody style that visually evokes the wistful rhythm of jazz." Metacritic, which uses a weighted average, assigned the film a score of 78 out of 100, based on 14 critics, indicating "generally favorable" reviews. Whitaker's performance as Parker earned positive notices and honors including the Best Actor award at the 1988 Cannes Film Festival and a Golden Globe nomination. Eastwood was awarded the Golden Globe for Best Director. The film won the Grand Prix of the Belgian Film Critics Association and the Academy Award for Best Sound (Les Fresholtz, Dick Alexander, Vern Poore, Willie Burton).

Despite its positive reception, Bird was a commercial failure, only grossing $2.2 million in the United States and Canada, Eastwood's worst-performing film since Breezy, and his third least-successful film overall; Breezy earned $200,000, while White Hunter Black Heart grossed $2 million at the box office. The film opened in France in June 1988 after its Cannes premiere and grossed $577,754 in its opening week. The film opened in one theater in New York City in October 1988 after its New York Film Festival screening and grossed $27,116 in its opening weekend.

"Clint Eastwood is a fabulous actor as well as a fabulous filmmaker," observed Rolling Stones drummer and jazz aficionado Charlie Watts. "When he made 52nd Street move in Bird, it was one of the most exciting things I'd ever seen. He took the shot from a black-and-white still and then suddenly it all became color and it moved! I'd have loved to have been there in the '40s."

== Bibliography ==
- Hughes, Howard (2009). Aim for the Heart. London: I.B. Tauris. ISBN 978-1-84511-902-7.
