= Billy Mitchell (pianist) =

- Born: William Allen Mitchell; November 23, 1943 (age 82); Tarrytown, New York, U.S.
- Genres: Jazz, smooth jazz, swing
- Occupations: Musician, producer, arranger, author, community activist
- Instruments: Piano, keyboards
- Years active: 1970–present
- Labels: Pausa, Vista, Optmism, PRC
- Website: www.billy-mitchell.com

William Allen Mitchell (born November 23, 1943) is an American jazz pianist, music producer, composer, and author. He is also known for his community work with at-risk youth.

== Career ==
Mitchell was born November 23, 1943, in Tarrytown, New York, and raised in Buffalo. His father was a Baptist minister and community activist. He is the younger brother of comedian and actor Scoey Mitchell. Mitchell was introduced to the piano as a child by his mother but resisted all formal instruction. Instead he learned to play the piano by listening to the music and jazz recordings of the day.

Mitchell attended Morehouse College in the early 1960s, where he majored in history and political science. Between classes he would sneak into the music department to play jazz. He joined an off-campus jazz group, performing before an audience for the first time in a local talent show. In search of a career in music, he moved to Los Angeles in 1970.

He formed the Billy Mitchell Trio in the 1970s, which later became the Billy Mitchell Group. During the 1980s and 1990s he performed at clubs and festivals, including the Sedona Jazz Festival.

During the 1980s, Mitchell wrote a monthly column for Gig magazine that advised musicians about work and career. His book The Gigging Musician (Hal Leonard Publishing) is based on his Gig magazine articles, as well as interviews with industry professionals.

Mitchell appeared in the film, Bird (1988) directed by Clint Eastwood, playing the part of Charlie Parker's pianist. He also appeared in Jazz, a docudrama about the lives and experiences of black musicians.

In 2002, Mitchell founded The Scholarship Audition Performance Preparatory Academy (SAPPA) to increase participation of inner-city students in music and art scholarship competitions. SAPPA also sponsors music workshops that provide free music instruction in various programs throughout the Los Angeles area. Mitchell established the Watts-Willowbook Conservatory and Youth Symphony.

== Awards and honors ==
- Gold Crown Award, Pasadena Arts Council, 2006
- Local Hero Award, KCET and Union Bank, 2010)
- Living Legend Award, Living Legend Foundation, (2012, July)

== Discography ==
=== As leader ===
- Blue City Jam (Pausa, 1984)
- Night Theme (Pausa, 1986)
- Faces (Vista, 1987)
- In Focus (Optimism, 1988)
- Live All Night Long (USA,1996)
- Passion (USA,1998)
- Never Give Up On Love (Paras, 2000)
- The Traveler (Vista, 2006)
- The Circle Of Friends-LIVE (Vista, 2011-14-17-19)
