= Within the Rock =

1996 US science fiction horror television film by Gary J. Tunnicliffe

- Genre: Horror, Science Fiction
- Written by: Gary J. Tunnicliffe
- Directed by: Gary J. Tunnicliffe
- Starring: Xander Berkeley; Brian Krause; Duane Whitaker; Michael Zelniker
- Composers: Tony Fennell; Rod Gammons
- Country of origin: United States
- Original language: English

Production
- Executive producers: Barry L. Collier; John Fremes; Barbara Javitz
- Producers: Stanley Isaacs; Scott McGinnis; Robert Patrick
- Cinematography: Adam Kane
- Editor: Roderick Davis
- Running time: 85 minutes
- Production companies: Le Monde; Prism Entertainment Corporation; 360 Entertainment

Original release
- Network: The Sci-Fi Channel
- Release: June 8, 1996

Within the Rock is a 1996 American made-for-TV science fiction horror film directed by Gary J. Tunnicliffe. It starred Xander Berkeley, Brian Krause, and Duane Whitaker. It featured a cameo from former U.S. Marine Corps captain and technical advisor Dale Dye.

== Plot ==
A group of space miners, supervised by Dr. Shaw, land on "Galileo's Child" (a large spherical asteroid about to hit the Earth), to pierce and undermine its structure in order to divert its trajectory. Thanks to a particular technology, astronauts can reproduce the Earth's atmosphere on the asteroid.

During the excavation in the rock, the body of a humanoid alien, apparently fossilized, is found in a mortuary to the wall of which a platinum plate weighing 130 kilograms (290 lb) is affixed.

Ryan, the head of the drilling job, is thrilled with the payoff he and his men can make. Dr. Shaw, who rejects Ryan's sexual advances, is instead interested only in the scientific aspect of the discovery and in the success of the operation.

The unexpected awakening of the alien, which begins to claim victims among the crew, generates panic among the survivors, who organize themselves to be able to eliminate it. The most powerful explosive weapons do not seem to injure it, but in the end, thanks to common fire extinguishers and the large boring drill, the mission is completed, and the Earth saved.

== Cast ==
- Xander Berkeley as Ryan
- Brian Krause as Luke Harrison
- Duane Whitaker as Potter
- Michael Zelniker as Archer
- Caroline Barclay as Dr. Dana Shaw
- Bradford Tatum as Cody Harrison
- Barbara Patrick as Samantha "Nuke-'em" Rogers
- Calvin Levels as Banton
- Earl Boen as Michael Isaacs
- Brioni Farrell as Agent Berger
- Dale Dye as General Hurst

== Release ==
=== Home media ===
The film was released on DVD by Image Entertainment on August 17, 1999. It was later released by Mill Creek Entertainment on May 10, 2011 as a part of a triple-feature with Phantom of the Opera (1998), and The Fear 2.

== Reception ==
TV Guide awarded the film 2/5 stars, writing, "Although professionally done on every level, this entry in the endless string of ALIEN (1979) knockoffs contains little to set itself apart." The film has a 4.3/10 star rating on IMDb, and was nominated for the Saturn Award for Best Home Video Release in 1997, and it was nominated for Best Film at Fantasporto 1997.
