= Maxophone =

Italian prog rock band

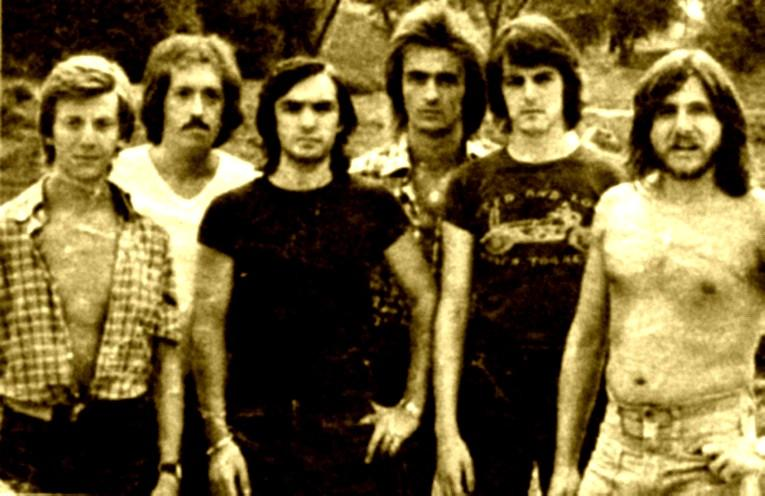
- Maxophone in 1975

Background information
- Origin: Milan, Italy
- Genre: Progressive rock
- Years active: 1973–1977, 2008 - present
- Labels: Produttori Associati, Pausa Records
- Members: Sergio Lattuada; Roberto Giuliani; Leonardo Schiavone; Maurizio Bianchini; Alberto Ravasini; Sandro Lorenzetti

Maxophone is an Italian progressive rock band formed in Milan in 1973. They released one self-titled album in 1975. The group was one of the few rock artists signed by the Produttori Associati record label, which focused mostly on film soundtracks and jazz. Maxophone have since acquired a minor cult following that has endured for over three decades, long after their short career had ended.

Among fans of the Italian progressive rock genre Maxophone is today widely regarded as one of the top groups, along with PFM, Le Orme, and Banco del Mutuo Soccorso. The group and their record label thought they had tremendous potential for success. They were one of only a handful of such groups to have the opportunity to record an English language version of their album.

The music of Maxophone has features typical of symphonic rock, including a high level of musical skill, shifting time signatures, and complex arrangements inspired by both classical and jazz. Half the members were classically trained; the rest had years of experience in other rock bands. Their music has a wide variety of textures, often in the same song. Horns and flute are equally balanced with piano, organs, synthesizers, and electric and acoustic guitars. They also include choral arrangements and instruments rarely heard in rock, such as clarinet, vibraphone and harp.

The first version was an Italian language album, released in Italy. Produttori Associati also released an English language version of the album in Germany and on their Pausa Records division in the US and Canada. The English version has the songs in a different order and they have been re-mixed, revealing some different musical details. The band hoped the English version would open themselves up to a wider audience, but this was not the case. However they were invited to perform at the prestigious Montreux Jazz Festival in 1976.

The group followed up the album with a somewhat more pop-oriented single in 1977, sung in Italian only, titled "Il Fischio del Vapore" (Steam Whistle) b/w "Cono di Gelato" (Ice Cream Cone). The two single tracks have since been added to some CD re-issues of the album. Maxophone disbanded soon after the single release, and despite the album becoming an artistic and critical success, they did not re-form for many years.

== Reemergence ==
In the early 1990s both versions of the album were re-issued on CD by Mellow Records. In 2001 Akarma Records also released the Italian album on vinyl. In 2006 a DVD/CD From Cocoon to Butterfly was produced. It contains video of the group performing at the RAI studio in Turin along with 10 additional studio recordings made between 1973 and 1975 and band interviews.

After a period of reflection a new version of Maxophone re-formed at the beginning of 2008 containing two of the original members. This version ended in 2018, with the passing of Sergio Lattuada, one of the founder members of the group who had strongly wanted their reunion.

== Discography ==
- Maxophone (1975)
- Maxophone (English version) (1975)
- From Cocoon to Butterfly (CD + DVD) (2006)
- Live in Tokyo (2013)
- La Fabbrica delle Nuvole (2017, AMS)
