= Fair Haven (Star Trek: Voyager) =

- Star Trek: Voyager episode
- Episode no.: Season 6 Episode 11
- Directed by: Allan Kroeker
- Written by: Robin Burger
- Production code: 231
- Original air date: January 12, 2000

Guest appearances
- Fintan McKeown - Michael Sullivan; Richard Riehle - Seamus Driscol; Henriette Ivanans - Maggie O'Halloran; Duffie McIntire - Grace; Jan Claire - Frannie Sullivan

Episode chronology
← Previous "Pathfinder"	Next → "Blink of an Eye"
- Star Trek: Voyager season 6

"Fair Haven" is the eleventh episode from the sixth season of the science fiction television series Star Trek: Voyager, 131st episode overall. The crew of starship USS Voyager explore a holodeck program crafted by Tom Paris, set in Ireland; meanwhile Voyager encounters a space storm. The show focuses on the experiences of Captain Janeway during this time.

== Plot ==
Tom Paris has written a popular new holodeck program about an Irish village called Fair Haven. Captain Janeway enters the program, and while she is taking a tour the crew is alerted to an approaching storm front. Lt. Torres informs the captain that the disruption caused by the storm prevents Voyager from going to warp, and impulse power will not be enough to outrun the storm. Janeway decides to batten the hatches, drop anchor and ride out the storm.

After a discussion about crew morale with Neelix, Janeway agrees to allow the Fair Haven program to continue to run. During this downtime many of the crew stop in to spend time in Fair Haven. Some even take roles in the village; the Doctor becomes the town priest and admonishes Paris and Kim to attend the following Sunday's Mass. Captain Janeway stops again to visit the program, and spends an evening getting to know one of the holodeck characters, barkeeper Michael Sullivan. After spending the entire night in a relaxed date with Sullivan, morning brings his wife into the program. Janeway becomes flustered and leaves the program, returning to the bridge as the first wave of the storm hits. The storm will last a further three days, and the captain gives Paris and Kim permission to expand the program to holodeck 2. At this point Captain Janeway edits the character of Sullivan to her specifications. She gives him more intelligence, a few traits that make him more compatible with her personality, and finally deletes his wife. While Janeway is spending time with her modified version of Sullivan, Chakotay encounters the two of them, causing the captain some embarrassment.

Janeway has mixed emotions about her motives, and discusses moral and ethical implications of having a relationship with a holodeck character with Chakotay. Being so far removed from any practical relationship with a "real" person, and realising that her first officer believes it could produce healthy results, Janeway continues to enjoy the holodeck program (as "Katie O'Clare"). Eventually she removes the other characters and kisses Sullivan.

While the captain is away from the program tending to ship's business, Sullivan becomes depressed because he thinks Katie has left him. He starts a fight in the holodeck which quickly grows into an all out brawl with both holodeck characters and crew members suffering the effects. After learning about the fight, the captain shares her thoughts and concerns with the Doctor. The Doctor sees holograms as equals to their flesh and blood counterparts, and encourages her to continue her relationship with Sullivan.

Eventually the full brunt of the storm hits with its most destructive forces taking out many of the ship's systems. While some of the holodeck program Fair Haven survives, many of its finer points are lost. When approached by Tom and Harry about what should be saved, the captain returns to the holodeck. She does decide to save the character of Michael Sullivan, and after more thought she tells the computer to deny her access to modifying any more of the program's sub-routines.

The story arc is concluded in Spirit Folk.

== Production ==
Kate Mulgrew stated in an interview at the end of the series that the only time she had been surprised by the characterisation of Janeway on screen was in the romance in "Fair Haven". She said that while she was happy that her character had a relationship, she felt that it didn't work as well as if it had been a real person and not a hologram.

The episode was written by Robin Burger, who also wrote the Star Trek:The Next Generation episode "The Hunted".

The Irish village scenes were filmed at Universal Studios, in California.

Guest cast includes:

- Richard Riehle as Seamus
- Fintan McKeown as Michael
- Jan Claire as Frannie
- Henriette Ivanas as Maggie
- Duffie McIntire as Grace

== Reception ==
IrishCentral pointed out this episode as an example of "the Irish side of Star Trek" and felt that character Michael Sullivan, one of the residents of the holographic 19th century village, was a sort of stock Irish TV character, but the plot had some "fairly Irish" elements. They also point out the episode for mentioning the real-world Irish universities of Trinity College Dublin and University College Dublin. Ian Grey at RogerEbert.com noted this episode in their feature on Star Trek: Voyager, pointed out this episode being in a "lighter vein" noting its recreation of an Irish town and Captain Janeway's adventures and holo-romance. TrekMovie.com suggested viewing it for Saint Patrick's Day due to its Irish content.

SyFy included this episode in a group of Star Trek franchise episodes they felt were commonly disliked but "deserved a second chance". W.I.R.E.D. noted that the crew found peace in, what it called a "virtual playroom program" but suggested skipping this episode in its Star Trek: Voyager binge-watching guide.

In 2019, Screen Rant ranked "Fair Haven" as one of the five worst Star Trek: Voyager episodes, (Note: The other four "worst" Star Trek: Voyager episodes on Screen Rant's list are "Spirit Folk", "Favorite Son", "The Fight" and "Threshold".) noting it as an episode about holodeck malfunctions; the list also included its sequel, "Spirit Folk", noting that it is worse than "Fair Haven" for being "[a]nother bad episode about the same thing." The Digital Fix said that "Fair Haven and its sequel Spirit Folk are perhaps the worst episodes of the seven year run". Tor.com gave it 0 out 10, complaining about Irish stereotypes, an uncompelling story, and nonsensical technological twists; they felt the holodeck did not behave like this in previous incarnations.

== Releases ==
This episode was released as part of a season 6 DVD boxset on December 7, 2004.

== See also ==
- The Practical Joker (Holodeck on Star Trek: The Animated Series // September 21, 1974)
- Encounter at Farpoint (Live-action Holodeck debuts on Star Trek: The Next Generation // September 28, 1987)
- Up the Long Ladder (A Star Trek: The Next Generation episode also criticized for Irish stereotypes)
