= Snide and Prejudice =

- Directed by: Philippe Mora
- Starring: Angus Macfadyen; René Auberjonois; Sam Bottoms; Jeffrey Combs; Claudia Christian; Mena Suvari; Brion James; Joseph Bottoms; Richard Edson; Richard Moll; Mick Fleetwood
- Release date: 1997
- Running time: 119 mins.
- Country: United States
- Language: English

Snide and Prejudice is a 1997 dark comedy film directed by Philippe Mora.

== Synopsis ==
At a mental institution, the resident physician, Dr Cohen, encourages his patients who believe that they are important Nazi figures to act out their fantasies. The therapy sessions show Hitler consolidating his power by assembling his gang of supporters; however, they are interrupted at times, once because Davidson's uniform is at the dry cleaners, and another time because a patient who believes he is Picasso interrupts a session.

== Cast ==
- Angus Macfadyen as Adolf Hitler / Michael Davidson
- René Auberjonois as Dr. Sam Cohen
- Sam Bottoms as Therapist Schaub
- Jeffrey Combs as Therapist Meissner
- Claudia Christian as Renate Müller
- Mena Suvari as Geli Raubal
- Brion James as Hermann Göring
- Joseph Bottoms as Therapist Himmler
- Richard Edson as Rudolf Hess
- Richard Moll as General Von Ludendorf
- Mick Fleetwood as Pablo Picasso
- John Dennis Johnston (credit-J.D. Johnson) as Sheffield
- Brian McDermott as Therapist Hindenberg
- Ivan H. Migel as General Von Kahr
- Patt Morrison as Herself / The Interviewer
- Jesse Grey Walken as Christ
- T.C. Warner as Tessa Percival / Eva Braun
- Michael Zelniker as Joseph Goebbels
