= Travelin' On =

Studio album by Oscar Peterson
- Released: 1968 (8-Track Cartridge), 1969 (LP)
- Recorded: April 1968
- Studio: Hans Georg Brunner-Schwer Studio; Villingen, West Germany
- Genre: Jazz
- Label: MPS
- Producer: Hans Georg Brunner-Schwer

Oscar Peterson chronology
My Favorite Instrument (1968)	Travelin' On (1968)	Mellow Mood (1969)

Professional ratings
Review scores
Source	Rating
AllMusic	4.5/5 stars
Penguin Guide to Jazz	3/4 stars

Travelin' On is an album by the jazz pianist Oscar Peterson and his trio, released in 1968. It was recorded during the same sessions as Mellow Mood. It was the sixth part of Peterson's Exclusively for My Friends series.

== Music ==
The Oscar Peterson trio included Sam Jones on bass and Bobby Durham on drums. "Sax No End" had been recorded for the first time in 1967 by the Kenny Clarke/Francy Boland Big Band. The AllMusic review suggested that "one can almost hear a larger ensemble by listening to Peterson's virtuoso interpretation in an uptempo setting, assisted by Jones' agile bass and Durham's steady percussion".

== Reception ==
The Penguin Guide to Jazz included the album in its selected "Core Collection".

== Track listing ==
1. "Travelin' On" (Traditional)
2. "Emily" (Johnny Mandel, Johnny Mercer)
3. "Quiet Nights" (Antonio Carlos Jobim, Gene Lees)
4. "Sax No End" (Francis Boland)
5. "When Lights Are Low" (Benny Carter, Spencer Williams)

== Personnel ==
- Oscar Peterson – piano
- Sam Jones – double bass
- Bobby Durham – drums
