= Tsunkatse =

- Star Trek: Voyager episode
- Episode no.: Season 6 Episode 15
- Directed by: Mike Vejar
- Story by: Gannon Kenney
- Teleplay by: Robert Doherty
- Cinematography by: Marvin V. Rush
- Production code: 232
- Original air date: February 9, 2000

Guest appearances
- The Rock – Champion; Jeffrey Combs – Penk; J. G. Hertzler – Hirogen Hunter

Episode chronology
← Previous "Memorial"	Next → "Collective"
- Star Trek: Voyager season 6

"Tsunkatse" is the fifteenth episode of the sixth season of the American science fiction television series Star Trek: Voyager. Set in the 24th century, the series follows the adventures of the Starfleet and Maquis crew of the starship USS Voyager after they were stranded in the Delta Quadrant far from the rest of the Federation.

In this episode, Seven of Nine (Jeri Ryan) is abducted, along with Tuvok (Tim Russ), while on a survey mission and forced by her captors to fight in an arena for the entertainment of others. It featured Dwayne "The Rock" Johnson in a guest role as a Pendari fighter, and former Star Trek: Deep Space Nine actors J. G. Hertzler and Jeffrey Combs.

Directed by Mike Vejar, it was developed from a story by Gannon Kenney and turned into a teleplay by Robert Doherty.

The episode first aired on the UPN network on February 9, 2000. It had originally been called "Arena". The crossover between Voyager and the UPN wrestling show WWF Smackdown was described as a "clever marketing ploy" by Russ, but received a negative fan reaction on broadcast. However, it received the highest ratings of the season having been watched by 4.1 percent of all Nielsen households during sweeps month. It received mixed reviews by critics, with praise reserved for Combs and Hertzler. The fight scenes were praised by Black Belt magazine.

== Plot ==
The crew are granted shore leave on an alien planet. Commander Chakotay (Robert Beltran) and Lieutenant B'Elanna Torres (Roxann Dawson) attend a mixed martial arts ring sport called "Tsunkatse", while Captain Kathryn Janeway (Kate Mulgrew) visits a neighboring system in the Delta Flyer. Following the match, Seven of Nine (Jeri Ryan) and Lieutenant Commander Tuvok (Tim Russ) ask Chakotay if they can study a micro-nebula on an away mission. He grants them permission, telling them that they can spend their shore leave in whatever manner they choose. Seven and Tuvok depart in a shuttle, but are captured by an alien vessel en route and Tuvok is injured. Seven is brought to Penk (Jeffrey Combs) who blackmails her into fighting in the Tsunkatse matches or else Tuvok will be refused medical treatment.

Chakotay invites other crew members to join him at the next Tsunkatse match. These include Neelix (Ethan Phillips), who is forced to restrict his activities following an allergic reaction to a homeopathic medical treatment. They arrive at the bout and Chakotay explains the rules of the fight to Neelix. The first challenger walks out, a Pendari man (Dwayne "The Rock" Johnson), and the Voyager crew are surprised when he is followed by Seven. As the two circle each other, Chakotay contacts Torres on the ship and updates her on the match, ordering her to transport Seven back to Voyager. Torres discovers that Seven is not on the planet's surface, and the fight is actually a holographic projection. Seven is defeated by the Pendari and later wakes up in the fighters' barracks where a Hirogen (J. G. Hertzler) is healing her with a dermal regenerator. Penk visits the duo and informs Seven that her next match will be to the death. After he leaves, the Hirogen promises to train her. Seven accepts his training, realizing that even if Voyager can rescue them, she and Tuvok must still survive until then.

On Voyager, the crew track down the source of the holographic transmission – a much larger ship. Seven is led out for the next Tsunkatse match, and discovers that the Hirogen himself is her opponent. As they start to fight, Voyager attacks the Tsunkatse vessel and destroys a localized shield generator. Torres transports Tuvok off the ship, but Seven isn't in the unshielded area of the ship. The Hirogen takes the advantage in the match, and Voyager's weapons are taken offline. Janeway arrives in the Delta Flyer and destroys the Tsunkatse ship's signal generators which broadcasts the matches. Penk reroutes power to another transmitter, thus weakening his shields. As Seven takes her position to reluctantly kill the Hirogen, both are transported onto Voyager. Afterwards, Chakotay tells the Hirogen that they are en route to transfer him to a vessel of his species. The Hirogen thanks the crew and tells them that he plans to look for his son.

== Production ==
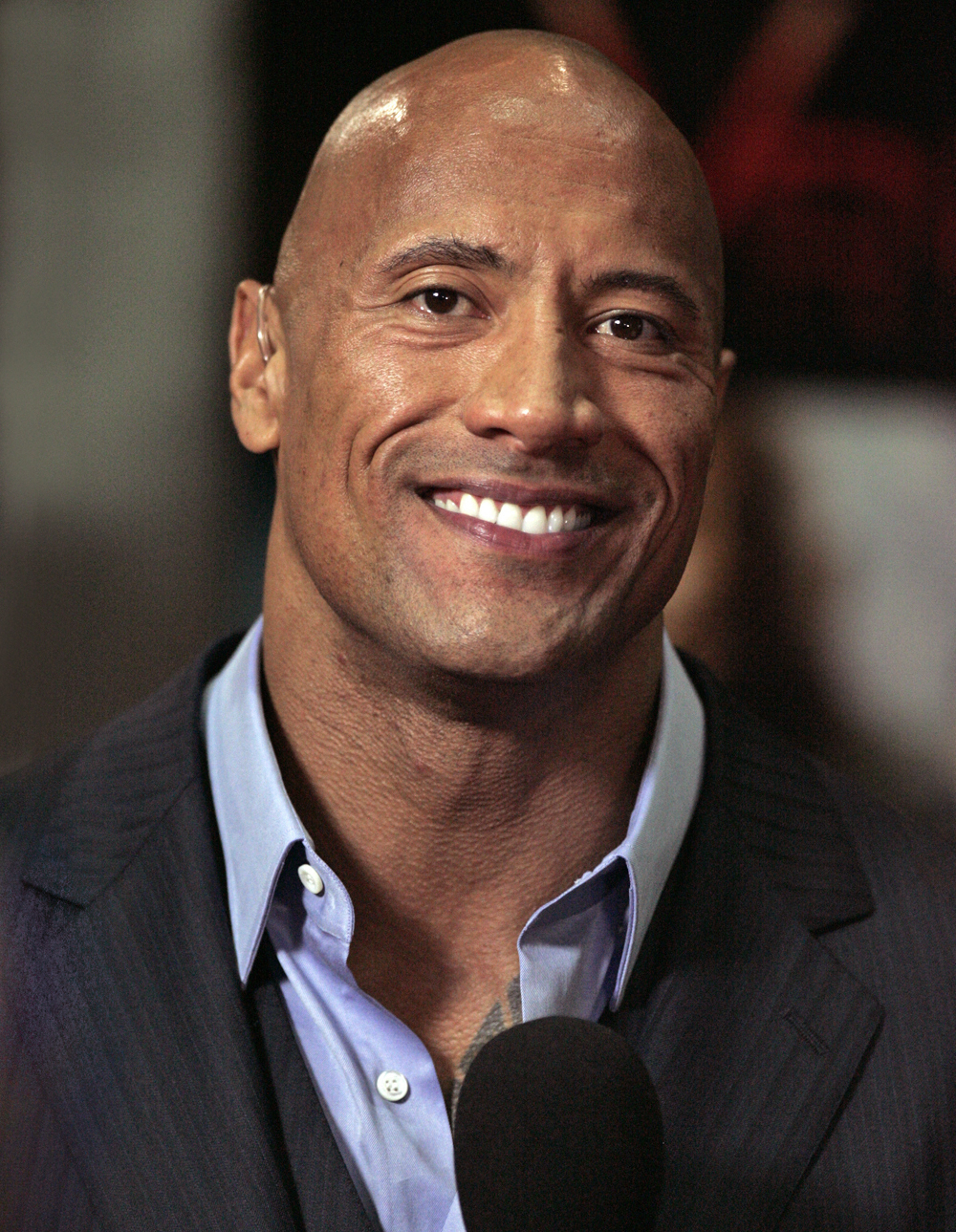
"Tsunkatse" featured The Rock, real name Dwayne Johnson, as the Pendari Champion

An early version of the script had Tuvok involved in the fighting, but it was decided that it would be more dramatic if there was a character involved who was not as adept at fighting. Instead, it was decided to have the character of Seven of Nine featured in this way which Tim Russ later described as a "clever marketing ploy", as UPN promoted that character heavily at the time. The episode was originally entitled "Arena", but was subsequently renamed to "Tsunkatse".

World Wrestling Federation wrestler and actor Dwayne "The Rock" Johnson appeared as the Pendari Champion in a special guest role. Johnson performed his own stunts in the episode, although the other actors were represented in the fight scenes by stunt doubles. He used one of his signature moves, "The Rock Bottom", during the fight scenes against Ryan's Seven of Nine as well as other wrestling moves. Despite the use of stunt doubles and the choreography of the fight scenes, Ryan was still reportedly quite sore after the first day's shooting completed.

The episode also featured guest appearances by actors J. G. Hertzler and Jeffrey Combs best known to Star Trek fans from the series Star Trek: Deep Space Nine, where they respectively played Martok and the double role of Weyoun and Brunt. Combs described his character as the "Don King of my quadrant", but was a little uneasy about appearing on Voyager after 35 episodes of Deep Space Nine, as some of the sets from his former show had been re-used in a different manner, saying: "It felt like how an old person might feel going home, but things are not quite the same".

Hertzler said in an interview that he based his character on the role played by Morgan Freeman in the film The Shawshank Redemption (1994). He said that "Freeman plays a lifer. A guy that's been a lifer in prison has a different attitude toward life and death". Other influences included Tony Todd, who had appeared as a Hirogen in the fourth season episode "Prey", and Hertzler subsequently compared the costumes that he and Todd wore in their roles, saying: "The frustrating thing for me was that Tony got to wear shoulder pads, a huge chest piece, a fabulous helmet. I didn't get any of that. I was in a skintight rubber suit. Had I been 23, I would have been much happier, but at 49?"

== Reception ==
"Tsunkatse" was first aired on February 9, 2000, on the UPN network during the sweeps month. It received a Nielsen rating of 4.1/6 percent, meaning that it was seen by 4.1 percent of all households, and 6 percent of all of those watching television at the time of the broadcast. This placed it in sixth place during the timeslot, but was the most watched episode of the sixth season. It was a slight increase in ratings compared to the previous year's episode "Bliss", which received ratings of 3.9 percent. However, it was the only episode broadcast in 2000 which saw an improvement from the same sweeps month during the previous year. The episode suffered from a negative fan reaction upon release, with it seen as an attempt to crossover between Voyager and UPN's other show, WWF SmackDown.

TV Guide ranked the cameo of Dwayne Johnson, who later gained fame as film star, as #4 out of "28 Surprising Star Trek Guest Stars".

Peter Franks reviewed the VHS release of the episode for Dreamwatch magazine, saying that it was "below average" and could have been a plot used on Star Trek: The Next Generation with Data replacing Seven of Nine. In the season six review by Dreamwatch, "Tsunkatse" was given a rating of three out of five. The fight scenes in the episode were reviewed by Robert W. Young for Black Belt magazine. Young described it as being "uncharacteristically cool from a martial arts perspective" and that "it was nice to see a value-judgement-free depiction of no-holds-barred competition on such a respected TV series". He thought that the combat itself was believable and that Seven may have been using moves taken from Jeet Kune Do, a style founded by Bruce Lee. He summed it up by saying that, in this episode, "The martial arts of Star Trek have finally gone where no one has gone before".

TrekNation reviewer Michelle Erica Green described the episode as the opposite of Gene Roddenberry's original ideals for Star Trek, but enjoyed the performances of Combs and Hertzler. She thought that Chakotay was poorly characterized in the episode, and predicted that the events portrayed would typically be forgotten by the next episode.

Jamahl Epsicokhan, at his website Jammer's Reviews, said that he thought that the episode would be a "ratings-stunt disaster", but that it turned out to be "surprisingly okay". However, he thought that the plot was absent but the episode was carried by strong guest stars; he gave it a score of two and a half out of four, calling it "entertainingly assembled trash".

SyFy included this episode in a group of Star Trek franchise episodes they felt were commonly disliked but "deserved a second chance".

== Home media release ==
"Tsunkatse" was first released as a two episode VHS cassette alongside "Collective" in the United Kingdom on October 2, 2000. It was included in the season six DVD set, released in the United States and Canada on December 7, 2004.
