= Child's Play (Star Trek: Voyager) =

- Star Trek: Voyager episode
- Episode no.: Season 6 Episode 19
- Directed by: Mike Vejar
- Story by: Paul Brown
- Teleplay by: Raf Green
- Production code: 239
- Original air date: March 8, 2000

Guest appearances
- Manu Intiraymi - Icheb; Marley S. McClean - Mezoti; Kurt Wetherill - Azan; Cody Wetherill - Rebi; Scarlett Pomers - Naomi Wildman; Tracey Ellis - Yifay; Mark A. Sheppard - Leucon; Eric Ritter - Yivel

Episode chronology
← Previous "Ashes to Ashes"	Next → "Good Shepherd"
- Star Trek: Voyager season 6

"Child's Play" is the 139th episode of Star Trek: Voyager, the 19th episode of the sixth season. Icheb (played by guest star Manu Intiraymi) takes center-stage as the crew of the USS Voyager spaceship once again grapple with the cybernetic Borg aliens, and their impact on the Delta Quadrant.

== Plot ==
Captain Janeway informs Seven of Nine that the parents of Icheb, one of the children that Seven has been taking care of, have been located and that he is going to have to leave Voyager.

When they near Icheb's home planet, readings indicate a Borg transwarp conduit nearby, and the planet has been attacked by the Borg several times. When Janeway, Seven, Icheb and Tuvok beam to the surface they meet the Brunali, who live in huts. The Brunali explain that they have to keep things frugal or the Borg will detect them and attack the planet again.

After meeting Icheb's parents, Leucon and Yifay, the away team and Icheb's parents return to Voyager and discuss how to make the transition easier. While on board, Leucon explains to Seven that the Borg took Icheb four years ago, when he wandered off to see a new fertilization array. After spending time with his parents, Icheb decides to stay with the Brunali, despite Seven's protests.

As Voyager leaves the planet, Seven begins to research the circumstances of Icheb's assimilation. She discovers that the Borg did not attack the planet four years ago, meaning that Leucon is lying. When Seven gives this information to Janeway, she turns the ship around and heads back to the Brunali planet.

Meanwhile, on the Brunali world, Icheb's parents grab him and inject him with an alien medical device, which renders Icheb unconscious. His parents put him on a shuttle heading for the Borg transwarp conduit.

When Voyager returns to the planet, Seven discovers the shuttle, with Icheb on it, heading for Borg space; Voyager pursues. Seven manages to transport Icheb onto Voyager just as a Borg sphere emerges from the conduit and traps both the shuttle and Voyager in a tractor beam. The crew transports a photon torpedo to the shuttle, which detonates inside the sphere and damages it, allowing Voyager to escape.

After leaving with Icheb, the Doctor determines that Icheb had been genetically engineered with anti-Borg pathogens, suggesting his parents had raised him specifically to infect the Borg (as seen in the earlier episode, "Collective") and stop the attacks on their planet. Seven begins to help Icheb understand that, as an individual, he can determine his own destiny.

== Reception ==
In 2022, SyFy Wire included "Child’s Play" as one of the 12 (Note: The SyFy Wire article treats the two-part / two-season episodes of "Scorpion" as one episode, doing the same for the similarly structured "Unimatrix Zero", when counting the number of episodes included in its list of 12.) "essential" Seven of Nine episodes in the franchise. This episode is noted for featuring the Borg aliens and fictional biological weapons.

== Continuity ==
The ex-Borg teenager Icheb was previously introduced in the episode "Collective" (S6E16), after which Icheb became a recurring character for the remainder of show's run. Icheb also returns in Star Trek: Picard season one.

== Releases ==
This episode was released as part of a season 6 DVD boxset on December 7, 2004.
