= Michael Zelniker =

Canadian actor

- Born: Montreal, Quebec, Canada
- Occupations: Actor; screenwriter; director
- Years active: 1980s–2020s
- Spouse: Dea Lawrence

Michael Zelniker is a Canadian born actor, director, and screenwriter. He is best known for his performance as Red Rodney in Clint Eastwood's Academy Award-winning film Bird (1988) and as Doug Alward in The Terry Fox Story (1983), for which he won a Genie Award for Best Supporting Actor at the 5th Genie Awards in 1984.

== Early life and education ==
Originally from Montreal, Quebec, Zelniker studied acting and theatre at Dawson College, Dome Theatre.

== Career ==
Zelniker appeared in the films Pick-up Summer (1980), Ticket to Heaven (1981), Heartaches (1981), Bird (1988), Glory Enough for All (1991), Naked Lunch (1991), Queens Logic (1991),Mercenary (1996) and Snide and Prejudice (1997), and made guest appearances in the television series The Littlest Hobo, In the Heat of the Night, Murder, She Wrote, Profiler, Strong Medicine, The Dead Zone and Millennium.

He wrote the screenplay for the 1998 film Stuart Bliss, in which he also played the title character. Stuart Bliss was also produced by Zelniker, and won the Northampton Film Festival's Best of Fest Award in 1998.

Zelniker wrote, produced, and directed Falling, which won Indie Fest USA International Film Festival's Best of Festival Award in 2012. In 2013 he began teaching Acting for Film, Chekhov Technique and Performing Shakespeare at the Los Angeles Campus of the New York Film Academy after teaching Acting for the Camera, Acting Technique and Shakespeare at the American Musical and Dramatic Academy from 2004 to 2013.

In 2018, Zelniker became a climate leader with the Climate Reality Project, trained by former Vice President Al Gore. He served as the Co-Chair of Climate Reality's Los Angeles Chapter from 2018 - 2021. He wrote, produced, edited and directed, The Issue with Tissue - a boreal love story. a documentary about the little known, largely untold story of the boreal forest and the Indigenous Peoples who call it home.

The Issue with Tissue held its world premiere at Cinéfest Sudbury International Film Festival on September 18, 2022, where it was recognized with their Audience Choice Runner-up Award. Playing in theaters in Los Angeles, Toronto, Montreal, Marin County and Quebec City and at film festivals across North America, The Issue with Tissue qualified for major awards' consideration, including being nominated for the 2023 Next Generation Indie Film Awards for Best Documentary Feature and the 2026 Raindance Film Festival Best Documentary Feature.

In 2024 Zelniker embarked on a 219 day journey, traveling to 21 countries around the world, focused on uplifting the stories of those on the frontlines of the global water crisis, those whose voices too often go unheard. This transformative journey yielded The Struggle for Mother Water, an 8-part/52 minutes per episode documentary series centered on the women who are waging a courageous, determined fight to protect and defend water. It premiered at the Berlinale International Film Festival in February 2026.

The Struggle for Mother Water also screened at the Taormina Film Festival where Zelniker was recognized for his documentary work with a Special Sustainability Award. The 8-part series be released to the public in the fall of 2026.

== Filmography ==
=== Film ===
Year	Title	Role	Notes
1980	Hog Wild	Pete Crenshaw	
1980	Pick-up Summer	Greg	
1981	Heartaches	Andy	
1981	Ticket to Heaven	Danny	
1985	Eleni	Sidney Cohn	
1986	Touch and Go	McDonald	
1988	Bird	Red Rodney	
1991	Queens Logic	Marty	
1991	Naked Lunch	Martin	
1995	Night Canvas	William Bannister	
1996	Mercenary	Alan Bailey	
1997	Snide and Prejudice	Joseph Goebbels	
1998	Stuart Bliss	Stuart Bliss	
2000	Nostradamus	John Doe	
2001	After Image	Rye	
2003	Killer Rats	Ernst	
2005	Nature Unleashed: Earthquake	Viktor	
2012	Falling	Writer/Producer/Director/Cinematographer/Editor	
2023	The Issue with Tissue - a boreal love story	Writer/Producer/Director/Cinematographer/Editor	

=== Television ===
Year	Title	Role	Notes
1983	The Terry Fox Story	Doug Alward	Television film
1983	A Case of Libel	David	Television film
1986	Crossings	Jean-Jacques Metzger	2 episodes
1988	Glory Enough for All	James Collip	Television film
1989	The Neon Empire	Burt Stone	Television film
1990	In the Heat of the Night	Paul Borden	Episode: "Bubba's Baby"
1992	Air Time	Rickey	Television film
1993	Bodies of Evidence	Ozzie Hanson	Episode: "Trial by Fire"
1993–1996	Murder, She Wrote	Various roles	3 episodes
1996	Within the Rock	Archer	Television film
1996	Millennium	Galen Calloway	Episode: "Kingdom Come"
1997	Chicago Hope	Gerry Clanahan	Episode: "Guns 'n' Roses"
1998	Profiler	Robert Carter	Episode: "Dying to Live"
2002	For the People	Dr. Bushnell	Episode: "Our Own"
2002	Tornado Warning	Steve	Television film
2003	Strong Medicine	Dr. Janovitch	Episode: "Vaccinations"
2003	Veritas: The Quest	Isaac	Episode: "The Name of God"
2005	The Inside	James Havens	Episode: "Pre-Filer"
2007	The Dead Zone	Philip	Episode: "Switch"
2026	The Issue with Tissue - a boreal love story	Writer/Producer/Director/Cinematographer/Editor	Limited Edition Television Series
2026	The Struggle for Mother Water	Writer/Producer/Director/Cinematographer/Editor	Limited Edition Television Series
