= Nature Unleashed: Earthquake =

2005 film directed by Tibor Takács

- Directed by: Tibor Takács
- Written by: Andy Hurst
- Starring: Fintan McKeown; Jacinta Mulcahy; Michael Zelniker
- Release date: September 13, 2005 (United States)
- Countries: United States; United Kingdom; Canada; Lithuania

Nature Unleashed: Earthquake, or simply known as Earthquake, is a 2005 American-British-Canadian-Lithuanian direct-to-video disaster film that is directed by Tibor Takács and written by Andy Hurst. It stars Fintan McKeown, Jacinta Mulcahy, and Michael Zelniker.

The film focuses on an 8.2.-magnitude earthquake destroying a Russian nuclear power plant called the Kasursk Nuclear Power Plant, triggering a nuclear meltdown.

== Summary ==
The people arrives at the Russian Nuclear Power Plant called the Kasursk Nuclear Power Plant. When an 8.2-magnitude earthquake of all time rips through Europe, it levels Russia and sends shockwaves through the lives of Russian people who live there. An earthquake destroys a Russian Nuclear Power Plant, triggering a nuclear meltdown and people in Russia need to survive. The cinematics of the film rely on other films scenes to hash out the story. Most notably, scenes of collapsing buildings and highways from the 1997 film Dante's Peak.

== Cast ==
- Fintan McKeown as Josh
- Jacinta Mulcahy as Rachel
- Michael Zelniker as Viktor
- Zoe Thorne as Cherie
- Damian Hunt as Dylan
- Patrick Monckton as Emilio
- Patrick Dreikauss as Leon
- Pete Lee-Wilson as Mikhail
- Lydie Denier as Miss White
- Jay Benedict as Mr. Reed

== Release ==
=== Home media releases ===
In the United States, the film was released on DVD by Echo Bridge Home Entertainment on September 13, 2005.

On September 9, 2009, the film was re-released on DVD by Echo Bridge Home Entertainment, as part of a double feature with another disaster film, Nature Unleashed: Avalanche.

=== Television broadcast ===
The film was premiered on the cable television channel Sci-Fi Channel in the United States in November 2006.

=== Philippines ( Tagalog Dubbed ) ===
Tagalog dubbed of Nature Unleashed: Earthquake was released on GTV (Philippine TV network) (sister channel of GMA 7) (Philippines) since 2021 premiere from Siesta Fiesta Movies on GTV at 12nn. Also on I Heart Movies distributes airing on Block Screening at 6pm premiere, and 2pm replay.

== See also ==
- Atomic Twister - similar disaster film about a tornado damaging a nuclear power plant
