= Fintan McKeown =

Irish actor

- Born: Ireland
- Occupation: Actor
- Years active: 1984–present
- Children: 3

Fintan McKeown is an Irish actor best known for his guest appearances on Star Trek: Voyager, Merlin, and Game of Thrones, and for his supporting roles in the films Immortal Beloved (1994) and Waking Ned Devine (1998).

Since beginning his career in 1985, McKeown has appeared in numerous films and television series produced in Ireland, Canada, the US and the United Kingdom.

== Filmography ==
Year	Title	Role	Notes
1984–1985	The Irish R.M.	Tom	TV series, episodes "Oweneen the Sprat" and "In the Curranhilty Country"
1986	Eat the Peach	Murtagh's Heavy	
1989–1991	Screen One	Doctor / Anthony Larrabeitti	TV series, episodes "The Accountant" and "Alive and Kicking"
1994	Screen Two	Brady	TV series, episode "O Mary This London"
1994	Immortal Beloved	Johann van Beethoven Sr.	
1996	Pie in the Sky	Ned Kelly	TV series, episode "Irish Stew"
1996	Bugs	Barry Stokes	TV series, episodes "What Goes Up..." and "...Must Come Down"
1997	Supply & Demand	DCI Smith	TV film
1998	Waking Ned	Pat Mulligan	
1999	Shergar	Det. Inspector Deely	
2000	Star Trek: Voyager	Michael Sullivan	TV series, episodes "Fair Haven" and "Spirit Folk"
2000	Nostradamus	Garamond	
2001	Mermaid Chronicles Part 1: She Creature	Skelly	TV film
2002	In Deep	Anderson	TV series, episode "Blood Loss"
2002	The Agency	Den	TV series, episode "Elite Meat to Eat"
2003	Conspiracy of Silence	Monsignor Thomas	
2004	Gargoyle: Wings of Darkness	Father Nikolai Soren	
2005	Nature Unleashed: Earthquake	Josh	
2009–2012	Merlin	King Odin	TV series, episodes "The Once and Future Queen" and "Another's Sorrow"
2010	Coming Up	The Man	TV series, episode "Boy"
2010	GoldenEye 007	Additional voices	Video game
2012	Game of Thrones	Amory Lorch	TV series, episodes "What Is Dead May Never Die", "Garden of Bones", "The Ghost of Harrenhal", and "The Old Gods and the New"
2012–2013	Hollyoaks	Seamus Brady	Soap opera, 25 episodes
2013	The Bible	Ekosh	TV miniseries, episode "Homeland"

== Personal life and politics ==
McKeown, who married in 1990, is a father of three.

In the 2017 UK General Election he stood as the candidate for the Green Party of England and Wales in the constituency of Windsor and finished fourth.

He was again asked to stand in the 2022 general election.
