= Continental Experience =

Studio album by George Shearing
- Released: 1975
- Genre: Jazz
- Label: MPS/BASF Records 68-097

George Shearing chronology
The Way We Are (1974)	Continental Experience (1975)	The Reunion (1976)

Professional ratings
Review scores
Source	Rating
AllMusic	2.5/5 stars

Continental Experience is a studio album by British jazz pianist George Shearing, billed as part of the 'George Shearing Quintet and Amigos'.

== Critical reception ==
Ken Dryden of AllMusic thought that while the album was an improvement over the band's previous albums, it failed to reach the level of the band's earlier works. He criticized it for the "rather conservative arrangements" and for the "incessant and generally extraneous" Latin percussion. Roger Dean, writing for Jazz Journal, also criticized the Latin percussion, which he called "quite predictable", while also pointing out the "excessive sentimentality" of the standards chosen for the album. The journalist felt the album was "extremely distasteful".

== Track listing ==
1. "Lullaby of Birdland" (George Shearing, George David Weiss) – 3:08
2. "When Your Lover Has Gone" (Einar Aaron Swan) – 2:55
3. "To a Wild Rose" (Edward MacDowell) – 3:07
4. "I'll Be Around" (Alec Wilder) – 2:36
5. "Thine Alone" (Victor Herbert, Henry Blossom) – 2:53
6. "Don't Blame Me" (Jimmy McHugh, Dorothy Fields) – 5:27
7. "The Continental" (Herb Magidson, Con Conrad) – 3:10
8. "The Nearness of You" (Hoagy Carmichael, Ned Washington) – 3:00
9. "Roses of Picardy" (Frederic Weatherly, Haydn Wood) – 2:53
10. "Someone to Watch Over Me" (George Gershwin, Ira Gershwin) – 2:33
11. "East of the Sun (and West of the Moon)" (Brooks Bowman) – 3:25
12. "We'll Be Together Again" (Carl Fischer, Frankie Laine) – 1:55
