= The Quota (Red Garland album) =

Studio album by Red Garland
- Released: 1973
- Recorded: May 1971
- Studio: RCA Studios, NYC
- Genre: Jazz
- Label: MPS; 21 20909-1
- Producer: Don Schlitten

Red Garland chronology
When There Are Grey Skies (1962)	The Quota (1973)	Auf Wiedersehen (1971)

The Quota is an album by pianist Red Garland which was recorded in 1971 and released on the MPS label in 1975.

== Reception ==
Professional ratings
Review scores
Source	Rating
AllMusic	4/5 stars

The AllMusic review by Ken Dryden stated "After being very active on records and in clubs from 1955-62, pianist Red Garland went back to his native Texas. He did not return to records until 1971, when he cut Auf Wiedersehen and this particular LP ... Garland plays in the same distinctive style he had in the 1950s, not showing any decline or loss of chops".

== Track listing ==
All compositions by Red Garland except where noted.

1. "The Quota" (Jimmy Heath) – 5:41
2. "Days of Wine and Roses" (Henry Mancini, Johnny Mercer) – 7:42
3. "For Carl" (Leroy Vinnegar) – 5:44
4. "The Squirrel" (Tadd Dameron) – 4:59
5. "On a Clear Day" (Burton Lane, Alan Jay Lerner) – 4:30
6. "Love for Sale" (Cole Porter) – 9:46

== Personnel ==
- Red Garland – piano
- Jimmy Heath – tenor saxophone, soprano saxophone
- Peck Morrison – bass
- Lenny McBrowne – drums
