= Csaba Deseo =

Hungarian jazz violinist

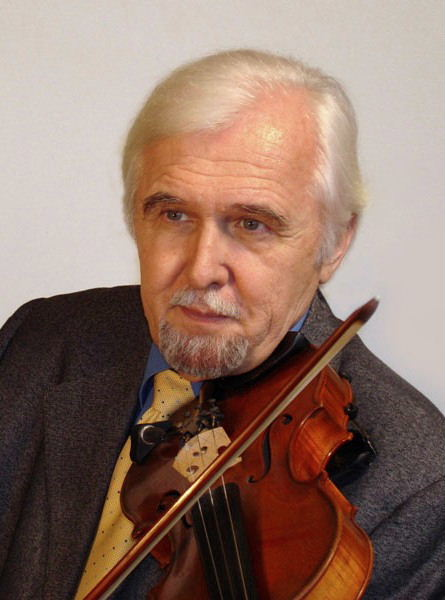
Csaba Deseo

Csaba Deseo (born 15 February 1939) is a Hungarian jazz violinist born in Budapest.

== Biography ==
His mother was a violin teacher. Deseo began playing violin at the age of 10, continued his musical education at Béla Bartók Conservatory in Budapest, and got his diploma in 1961. He taught in music schools until 1967 when he became a member of the Hungarian National Philharmonic Orchestra, where he played until 1999. During the time when János Ferencsik and later Kobayashi Ken-Ichiro were chief musical directors of the orchestra he played innumerable concerts in Hungary and in many countries of the world from Japan to the United States. He performed with artists like Antal Doráti, Sir Georg Solti, Leonard Bernstein, Claudio Abbado, Lorin Maazel, Riccardo Muti, Lamberto Gardelli, Giuseppe Patane, Christoph von Dohnányi, Ádám Fischer, Yehudi Menuhin, David Oistrach and Mstislav Rostropovich.

His career took off in 1963 when he appeared with his first group at the legendary Dalia Club in Budapest. From 1964 they gave regular concerts and were frequently featured on Hungarian Radio and TV. Csaba Deseo's debut abroad was in Bled, Yugoslavia 1966, where he played with János Gonda's Qualiton Ensemble. That same year he played with his own group at the Prague International Jazz Festival and with the combo of guitarist Andor Kovacs at the Warsaw Jazz Jamboree. Csaba Deseo's first album under his own name "Four String Tschaba" was published in 1975 by MPS Records in West Germany. On that Deseo played both violin and viola, his partners were German, British and Swedish musicians. Since then Csaba Deseo has recorded 4 LPs and 6 CDs with Hungarian and foreign musicians.

In 1975 he met the famous Zagreb vibraphonist Bosko Petrovic, with whom he has been playing regularly until 2011. He also appears as a guest star in Germany, where he usually solos with the group of Walter Kurowski.

Since 1980 Deseo has fronted bands with different line-ups. His more important partners were pianist Laszlo Gardony, vibes player Richard Kruza, guitarist Andor Kovacs, bass player Bela Lattmann and drummer Imre Koszegi. Since 1990 he's been working mainly with musicians such as the trio of guitarist Istvan Gyarfas, or the pianist Gabor Cseke. He is regular guest artist at the concerts of the Benko Dixieland Band and the Budapest Ragtime Band.

During the past few decades he has also played with international stars like Jean-Luc Ponty, John Lewis, Jiggs Whigham, Martin Drew, Dusko Gojkovich, Tony Lakatos, Gábor Szabó, Tommy Vig and many others.

Csaba Deseo is a regular contributor to the specialist Hungarian music magazine, GRAMOFON – Classical and Jazz.

== Discography ==
Hot Club Blues

Title	Year	Label
FOUR STRING TSCHABA	1975	MPS Records
ULTRAVIOLA	1977	HUNGAROTON
BLUE STRING	1984	HUNGAROTON
HOT CLUB BUDAPEST "Felhök" w. Andor Kovacs	1985	HUNGAROTON
THE SWINGING VIOLIN w. Bosko Petrovic	1993	JAZZETTE – ZAGREB
MAGIC VIOLIN	1995	PANNON JAZZ
SOMETHING NEW, SOMETHING OLD	1997	PANNON JAZZ
KEEP COOL	2000	PANNON JAZZ
FUNKY VIOLIN (compilation)	2001	HUNGAROTON
TALE w. Istvan Gyarfas trio	2003	DRUM-ART RECORDS
