= Ashes to Ashes (Star Trek: Voyager) =

- Star Trek: Voyager episode
- Episode no.: Season 6 Episode 18
- Directed by: Terry Windell
- Story by: Ronald Wilkerson
- Teleplay by: Robert Doherty
- Production code: 238
- Original air date: March 1, 2000

Guest appearances
- Kim Rhodes - Lyndsay Ballard / Jhet'laya; Marley S. McClean - Mezoti; Manu Intiraymi - Icheb; Kurt Wetherill - Azan; Cody Wetherill - Rebi; Scarlett Pomers - Naomi Wildman; Kevin Lowe - Q'Ret

Episode chronology
← Previous "Spirit Folk"	Next → "Child's Play"
- Star Trek: Voyager season 6

"Ashes to Ashes" is the 138th episode of Star Trek: Voyager, the 18th episode of its sixth season.

It features Seven of Nine attempting to mother ex-Borg orphans, while USS Voyager encounters a unique alien species, the Kobali. The episode was nominated for an Emmy award for makeup, by a team including Michael Westmore.

The episode aired on the television channel UPN on March 1, 2000.

== Plot ==
An alien comes aboard Voyager, claiming to be a deceased member of the crew, Ensign Lyndsay Ballard. She explains that an alien race, the Kobali, reproduce by reanimating dead individuals of other races and altering their DNA. The Kobali expect reanimated individuals to live with them, but Ballard escaped and sought Voyager for asylum. Ballard confirms details of her death and past life aboard Voyager, and the Doctor confirms that her DNA partially matches the deceased Ballard's. The crew believe her story, and the Doctor attempts to restore her appearance from Kobali to human. She begins a relationship with Harry Kim.

Ballard finds readjustment difficult. Her favorite food tastes metallic due to her Kobali physiology; she sometimes speaks in Kobali without realizing; she is emotionally volatile; and she must visit Sickbay twice daily to maintain her human appearance. When her Kobali father finds Voyager to retrieve her, she reluctantly agrees to leave after an emotional moment with Harry.

In a side plot, Seven of Nine attempts to handle the task of caring for the Borg children. She implements a rigid schedule and punishments for deviation, but the children rebel out of a need for individuality. With Chakotay's encouragement, Seven learns to be more flexible with the children.

== Reception ==
This episode was nominated for an Emmy award for outstanding makeup.

"Ashes to Ashes" was noted in the book To Boldly Go: Essays on Gender and Identity in the Star Trek Universe for its presentation of a female character.

This episode was noted by CBR for guest-starring actress Kim Rhodes, who later became more famous for other roles in her career. The Digital Fix also praised Rhodes' performance.

== Releases ==
This episode was released as part of a season 6 DVD boxset on December 7, 2004.
