= Girl Talk (Oscar Peterson album) =

Studio album by Oscar Peterson
- Released: 1968
- Recorded: Late 1965, November 1966, November 1967, April 1968
- Studio: Hans Georg Brunner-Schwer Studio, Villingen-Schwenningen, West Germany
- Genre: Jazz
- Length: 40:21
- Label: MPS
- Producer: Hans Georg Brunner-Schwer

Oscar Peterson chronology
The Way I Really Play (1968)	Girl Talk (1968)	My Favorite Instrument (1968)

Girl Talk (also released as Oscar Peterson Plays for Lovers) is a 1968 studio album by jazz pianist Oscar Peterson, the second volume of his Exclusively for My Friends series. It was compiled from live studio sessions recorded between 1964 and 1966.

== Reception ==
Professional ratings
Review scores
Source	Rating
AllMusic	3/5 stars
The Penguin Guide to Jazz Recordings	3/4 stars
The Rolling Stone Jazz Record Guide	3/5 stars

For AllMusic, critic Ken Dryden wrote, "The title track, an overlooked gem jointly written by Bobby Troup and Neal Hefti, finds the leader in a bluesy mood. The relaxed but jaunty treatment of 'Robbin's Nest' follows a powerful medley of 'I Concentrate on You' and 'Moon River' to wrap up this highly recommended session." The Penguin Guide to Jazz included the album in its suggested "Core Collection".

== Track listing ==
1. "On a Clear Day (You Can See Forever)" (Burton Lane, Alan Jay Lerner) – 4:27
2. "I'm in the Mood for Love" (Dorothy Fields, Jimmy McHugh) – 17:22
3. "Girl Talk" (Neal Hefti, Bobby Troup) – 5:41
4. Medley: "I Concentrate on You"/"Moon River" (Cole Porter)/(Henry Mancini, Johnny Mercer) – 6:30
5. "Robbins' Nest" (Illinois Jacquet, Bob Russell, Sir Charles Thompson) – 6:21

== Personnel ==
- Oscar Peterson – piano, all tracks
- Ray Brown - double bass on "Robbin's Nest"
- Sam Jones – double bass on "On a Clear Day", "Girl Talk", "I'm in the Mood for Love"
- Bobby Durham – drums on "On a Clear Day", "Girl Talk"
- Louis Hayes - drums on "I'm In The Mood For Love", "Robbin's Nest"
