= Exclusively for My Friends =

Box set by Oscar Peterson
- Released: 1970
- Recorded: 1963–1968
- Genre: Jazz
- Length: 243:30
- Label: MPS, Verve
- Producer: Hans Georg Brunner-Schwer

Oscar Peterson chronology
Motions and Emotions (1969)	Exclusively for My Friends (1970)	Hello Herbie (1970)

Professional ratings
Review scores
Source	Rating
Allmusic	5/5 stars

Exclusively for My Friends is a series of originally six albums for the MPS label by Canadian jazz pianist Oscar Peterson. The album tracks were recorded live by Hans Georg Brunner-Schwer for MPS on the occasion of private concerts with a small audience in his home studio. The albums have been collected in different box sets over the years.

== Recording and release ==
Recording took place in six separate sessions between 1963 and 1968 in different trio settings as well as with Peterson playing solo. The recordings include performances with his most well-known trio consisting of double bassist Ray Brown and drummer Ed Thigpen and also teams him with bassist Sam Jones and drummers Louis Hayes or Bobby Durham. While around 60 tracks were recorded, only 37 were initially released in five trio albums and one solo album, the first in Peterson's career. The titles on each album were often selected from different recording sessions. Peterson was personally involved in selecting and editing the tapes. Due to contractual reasons, the albums were not released before 1968.

In 1992, the series was re-released as a four CD box set by MPS (and by Verve in the US) which included all recordings of the six original albums. In 1995, the release of the compilation Exclusively for My Friends: The Lost Tapes added twelve previously unreleased tracks to the collection. The constituent albums were also available as individual CDs.

MPS released remastered versions of the original albums as a six LP box set in 2014. One year later, an eight CD box set followed that collected the six albums plus two volumes of Lost Tapes, adding another ten tracks to the overall release group which were personally selected by Hans Georg Brunner-Schwer for release shortly before his death in 2004.

The Penguin Guide to Jazz includes the albums in its "Core Collection".

== Original album series ==
- Action (Vol. 1)
- Girl Talk (Vol. 2)
- The Way I Really Play (Vol. 3)
- My Favorite Instrument (Vol. 4) solo piano

== The Lost Tapes ==
- Exclusively for My Friends: The Lost Tapes (1995)

== Track listings ==
For the original track listings see the individual album articles above.

=== Four CD Box (1992) ===
CDs 1-3 collect Vol. 1-4 and 6 mostly in the original running order, while CD 4 matches Vol. 4, which contains the solo recordings.

CD 1
No.	Title	Writer(s)	Length
1.	"At Long Last Love"	Cole Porter	4:56
2.	"Easy Walker"	Billy Taylor	9:36
3.	"Tin Tin Deo"	Gil Fuller, Chano Pozo	5:34
4.	"I've Got a Crush on You"	George Gershwin, Ira Gershwin	5:15
5.	"A Foggy Day"	G. Gershwin, I. Gershwin	4:35
6.	"Like Someone in Love"	Johnny Burke, Jimmy Van Heusen	11:18
7.	"On a Clear Day You Can See Forever"	Burton Lane, Alan Jay Lerner	4:29
8.	"I'm in the Mood for Love"	Dorothy Fields, Jimmy McHugh	16:50
9.	"Girl Talk"	Neal Hefti, Bobby Troup	5:32

CD 2
No.	Title	Writer(s)	Length
1.	"Robbins Nest"	Illinois Jacquet, Bob Russell, Sir Charles Thompson	6:16
2.	"Medley: I Concentrate on You/Moon River"	Porter/Henry Mancini, Johnny Mercer	6:24
3.	"Medley: Waltzing Is Hip/Satin Doll"	Ray Brown, Johnny Mercer/Duke Ellington, Mercer	16:02
4.	"Our Love Is Here to Stay"	G. Gershwin, I. Gershwin	4:45
5.	"Sandy's Blues"	Oscar Peterson	9:26
6.	"Alice in Wonderland"	Sammy Fain, Bob Hilliard	4:41
7.	"Noreen's Nocturne"	Peterson	5:15
8.	"In a Mellow Tone"	Ellington, Milt Gabler	5:58
9.	"Nica's Dream"	Horace Silver	7:46

CD 3
No.	Title	Writer(s)	Length
1.	"On Green Dolphin Street"	Bronislaw Kaper, Ned Washington	6:18
2.	"Summertime"	G. Gershwin, I. Gershwin, DuBose Heyward	5:20
3.	"Sometimes I'm Happy (Sometimes I'm Blue)"	Irving Caesar, Vincent Youmans	5:04
4.	"Who Can I Turn To (When Nobody Needs Me)"	Leslie Bricusse, Anthony Newley	6:18
5.	"Travelin' On"	Traditional	2:29
6.	"Emily"	Johnny Mandel, Mercer	10:16
7.	"Quiet Nights of Quiet Stars"	Antonio Carlos Jobim, Gene Lees	7:25
8.	"Sax No End"	Boland	5:57
9.	"When Lights Are Low"	Benny Carter, Spencer Williams	10:53

CD 4
No.	Title	Writer(s)	Length
1.	"Someone to Watch over Me"	G. Gershwin, I. Gershwin	4:10
2.	"Perdido"	Ervin Drake, Hans J. Lengsfelder, Juan Tizol	6:10
3.	"Body and Soul"	Edward Heyman, Robert Sour, Frank Eyton, Johnny Green	4:28
4.	"Who Can I Turn To (When Nobody Needs Me)"	Bricusse, Newley	4:53
5.	"Bye Bye Blackbird"	Mort Dixon, Ray Henderson	4:50
6.	"I Should Care"	Sammy Cahn, Axel Stordahl, Paul Weston	4:42
7.	"Lulu's Back in Town"	Al Dubin, Harry Warren	2:00
8.	"Little Girl Blue"	Lorenz Hart, Richard Rodgers	6:02
9.	"Take the "A" Train"	Billy Strayhorn	2:37

=== Eight CD Box Set (2015) ===
Track listings for CDs 1-7 like the original releases (see above).

CD 8 - The Lost Tapes 2
No.	Title	Writer(s)	Length
1.	"Autumn Leaves"	Jacques Prévert, Johnny Mercer, Joseph Kosma	5:10
2.	"The Folks Who Live On The Hill"	Jerome Kern, Oscar Hammerstein	8:31
3.	"Body and Soul"	Edward Heyman, Frank Eyton, John W. Green, Robert Sour	5:13
4.	"Misty"	Erroll Garner, Johnny Burke	8:28
5.	"Hymn to Freedom"	Harriette Hamilton, Oscar Peterson	7:37
6.	"Goodbye"	Gordon Jenkins	6:43
7.	"Li'l Darlin'"	Neil Hefti	9:43
8.	"Satin Doll"	Billy Strayhorn, Duke Ellington, Johnny Mercer	7:49
9.	"All Of Me"	Gerald Marks, Seymour Simons	6:33
10.	"A Lovely Way to Spend an Evening"	Harold Adamson, Jimmy McHugh	3:33

== Personnel ==
- Oscar Peterson - piano
- Ray Brown - double bass
- Ed Thigpen - drums
- Sam Jones - double bass
- Louis Hayes - drums
- Bobby Durham - drums
