= Auf Wiedersehen (Red Garland album) =

Studio album by Red Garland
- Released: 1975
- Recorded: May 1971
- Studio: RCA Studios, NYC
- Genre: Jazz
- Label: MPS (21 20910-5)
- Producer: Don Schlitten

Red Garland chronology
| The Quota (1977) | Auf Wiedersehen (1975) | Groovin' Live (1974) |

Auf Wiedersehen is an album by pianist Red Garland which was recorded in 1971 and released on the MPS label in 1975. The title means Goodbye in German.

== Reception ==
Professional ratings
Review scores
| Source | Rating |
|---|---|
| AllMusic | 4/5 stars |

The AllMusic review by Ken Dryden stated "Red Garland returned to the recording studio in 1971, after a layoff of nearly nine years, to record this trio set for MPS. Accompanied by bassist Sam Jones and drummer Roy Brooks, Garland is in great form".

== Track listing ==
All compositions by Red Garland except where noted.

1. "Hobo Joe" (Joe Henderson) – 8:38
2. "Auf Wiedersehen" – 6:26
3. "A Night in Tunisia" (Dizzy Gillespie) – 6:53
4. "Old Stinky Butt" – 9:40
5. "Stella by Starlight" (Victor Young, Ned Washington) – 4:54
6. "Daahoud" (Clifford Brown) – 6:16

== Personnel ==
- Red Garland – piano
- Sam Jones – bass
- Roy Brooks – drums
