= Soul Español =

Studio album by Oscar Peterson
- Released: 1967
- Recorded: December 12–14, 1966
- Studio: Universal Recorders, Chicago, Illinois
- Genre: Jazz
- Length: 33:10
- Label: Limelight
- Producer: Hal Mooney

Oscar Peterson chronology
Something Warm (1967)	Soul Español (1967)	Action (1968)

Soul Español is an album by jazz pianist Oscar Peterson, released in 1966. It focuses mostly on the music of Brazilian composers.

== Reception ==
Professional ratings
Review scores
Source	Rating
AllMusic	3.5/5 stars
The Rolling Stone Jazz Record Guide	2/5 stars

For AllMusic, critic Ken Dryden wrote, "With the surge of interest in bossa nova and samba, Peterson's interpretations of songs like 'Manha de Carnaval', 'How Insensitive', 'Meditation', and 'Samba de Orfeo' have stood up very well against similar jazz recordings of the mid-'60s. This is an enjoyable, if not essential, part of Oscar Peterson's considerable discography."

== Track listing ==
1. "Mas que Nada" (Jorge Ben Jor) – 2:27
2. "Manhã de Carnaval" (Luiz Bonfá, Vinicius de Moraes) – 3:45
3. "Call Me" (Tony Hatch) – 5:19
4. "How Insensitive" (de Moraes, Norman Gimbel, Antonio Carlos Jobim) – 4:02
5. "Carioca" (Edward Eliscu, Gus Kahn, Vincent Youmans) – 4:31
6. "Soulville Samba" (Oscar Peterson) – 2:25
7. "Amanha (Tomorrow)" (Phil Bodner) – 4:21
8. "Meditation" (Gimbel, Jobim, Newton Mendonca) – 4:15
9. "Samba Sensitive" (Peterson) – 3:20
10. "Samba de Orfeu" (Bonfá, de Moraes) – 3:51

== Personnel ==
- Oscar Peterson - piano
- Sam Jones - double bass
- Louis Hayes - drums
- Henley Gibson - conga
- Harold Jones - percussion
- Marshall Thompson - timbales
