= Mellow Mood =

Studio album by Oscar Peterson
- Released: 1969
- Recorded: April 1968
- Studio: Hans Georg Brunner-Schwer Studio, Villingen, West Germany
- Genre: Jazz
- Length: 37:38
- Label: MPS
- Producer: Hans Georg Brunner-Schwer

Oscar Peterson chronology
Travelin' On (1968)	Mellow Mood (1969)	Motions and Emotions (1969)

Mellow Mood is an album by jazz pianist Oscar Peterson and his trio. The session was recorded in Germany at the private studio of Hans Georg Brunner-Schwer and released on the German MPS label. This album was the fifth part of Peterson's Exclusively for My Friends series on MPS. The series was reissued as a box set in 1992 by MPS (and later expanded with The Lost Tapes). A remastered SACD was issued in 2003 on Verve Records.

== Reception ==
Professional ratings
Review scores
Source	Rating
AllMusic	3.5/5 stars
The Penguin Guide to Jazz Recordings	3/4 stars
The Rolling Stone Jazz Record Guide	3/5 stars

For AllMusic, critic Ken Dryden wrote, "The fifth volume of Oscar Peterson's Exclusively for My Friends series is another lively trio affair with Sam Jones and Bobby Durham, though the album title Mellow Mood is a bit deceptive." The Penguin Guide to Jazz includes the album in its selected "Core Collection".

== Track listing ==
1. "In a Mellow Tone" (Duke Ellington, Milt Gabler) – 6:07
2. "Nica's Dream" (Horace Silver) – 7:56
3. "On Green Dolphin Street" (Bronislau Kaper, Ned Washington) – 6:27
4. "Summertime" (George Gershwin, Ira Gershwin, DuBose Heyward) – 5:30
5. "Sometimes I'm Happy" (Irving Caesar, Vincent Youmans) – 5:12
6. "Who Can I Turn To (When Nobody Needs Me)" (Leslie Bricusse, Anthony Newley) – 6:26

== Personnel ==
- Oscar Peterson – piano
- Sam Jones – double bass
- Bobby Durham – drums
