= Spirit Folk (Star Trek: Voyager) =

- Star Trek: Voyager episode
- Episode no.: Season 6 Episode 17
- Directed by: David Livingston
- Written by: Bryan Fuller
- Cinematography by: Marvin V. Rush
- Production code: 237
- Original air date: February 23, 2000

Guest appearances
- Fintan McKeown - Michael Sullivan; Richard Riehle - Seamus Driscol; Ian Abercrombie - Milo; Ian Patrick Williams - Doc Fitzgerald; Henriette Ivanans - Maggie O'Halloran; Duffie McIntire - Grace; Bairbre Dowling - Edith

Episode chronology
← Previous "Collective"	Next → "Ashes to Ashes"
- Star Trek: Voyager season 6

"Spirit Folk" is the 137th episode of the American science fiction television series Star Trek: Voyager airing on the UPN network. It is the 17th episode of the sixth season. The titular USS Voyager spacecraft is stranded on the other side of the Galaxy as Earth and the United Federation of Planets.

In this episode, the crew go on an adventure in the holodeck, but things go wrong.

Some of the music by Jay Chattaway was nominated for an Emmy.

== Plot ==
The crew continues to enjoy the Fair Haven holodeck program. After Lt. Tom Paris's suggestion, the holo-program is set to run continuously, but over time, the strain put on the holo-technology begins to cause problems. The hologram characters gradually realize that the visitors can change their world at will (normally, holograms' programming makes them oblivious to non-in-world aspects). Frightened, the villagers begin to suspect that the crew are spirit folk that have come to destroy Fair Haven.

Captain Janeway manages to elude her companion, Michael the barkeeper, but nevertheless asks Tom and Ensign Harry Kim to figure out the problem with the Fair Haven program. The two establish that the subroutines that make holograms unaware of anything outside their program have malfunctioned due to prolonged operation. When Tom and Harry enter the program to repair it, they are captured and held hostage by the holograms, who try to make Tom and Harry spill secrets about the spirit folks.

The Doctor, in the role of the village priest, enters the holodeck using his mobile emitter to avoid being influenced by the damaged holoprogram. However the emitter is confiscated and he is held captive with Tom and Harry. Michael, determined to find "Katie" (Janeway), puts the emitter on. Janeway, thinking that it is the Doctor, orders him transported to the bridge.

Janeway can no longer deceive Michael. She explains that her crew are on a spaceship and on a long journey. They enjoy the occasional visit to peaceful Fair Haven. They afterwards reenter the holodeck and convince the other characters that the crew has no hostile intentions.

While Torres is able to repair the program, it can no longer run continuously without risking breaking down again, so the crew decide to have one last drink together at the bar before shutting it down.

== Continuity ==
The story arc began in the season six episode "Fair Haven", the first Voyager episode featuring the town.

== Reception ==
Some of the music in this episode, by composer Jay Chattaway, was nominated for an Emmy award.

"Spirit Folk" was suggested viewing for Saint Patrick's Day due to its Irish content.

Den of Geek made a ranking of all 23 episodes written by Bryan Fuller for Star Trek up to that time, and placed this episode very last, remarking "'Spirit Folk' was pretty much just another episode where the holodeck malfunctions". Screen Rant rated it the 10th worst episode of the Star Trek franchise up to that time, and as one of the top five worst of the series, noting that by this point the idea of self-aware holograms may have lost its freshness. They went on to rank this episode as the sixth worst episode of Star Trek: Voyager, based on an IMDb rating of 6.3 out of 10 at that time. CBR included it on a ranking of Star Trek episodes "So Bad They Must Be Seen" and noted it had not been received well by audiences. The Digital Fix said that "'Fair Haven' and its sequel 'Spirit Folk' are perhaps the worst episodes of the seven year run" and remarking that "Spirit Folk" "is just as painful to watch". However, they did note it received an Emmy nomination for its music.

== Releases ==
This episode was released as part of a season 6 DVD boxset on December 7, 2004.
