= Action (Oscar Peterson album) =

Studio album by Oscar Peterson
- Released: 1968
- Recorded: March 1963, April 1964
- Studios: Hans Georg Brunner-Schwer Studio, Villingen, West Germany
- Genre: Jazz
- Length: 41:14
- Label: MPS

Oscar Peterson chronology
Soul Español (1967)	Action (1968)	The Way I Really Play (1968)

Easy Walker! Cover

Action is an album by Oscar Peterson, the first volume of his Exclusively for My Friends series. Originally released by MPS Records, it was later released by Prestige Records as Easy Walker.

== Reception ==
Professional ratings
Review scores
Source	Rating
AllMusic	4/5 stars
The Penguin Guide to Jazz Recordings	3/4 stars
The Rolling Stone Jazz Record Guide	3/5 stars

An audiophile reviewer commented that the recording balance was inconsistent and that the bass sound on the first two tracks was "fat, tuneless woof as if the instrument were stuffed with a large, very fluffy bath towel".

The AllMusic review by Ken Dryden said, "Action represents some of Peterson's earliest work for Brunner-Schwer; these sessions were recorded before an invited audience in the studio, with the pianist's working trio of Ray Brown and Ed Thigpen. The group seems extremely relaxed and inspired by the small group of loyal fans, with a brisk waltz treatment of /At Long Last Love/ and an extended workout of fellow pianist Billy Taylor's ballad 'Easy Walker' starting things off with a flourish. Their approach to 'Tin Tin Deo' is remarkably subtle, while Peterson is at his most lyrical during a pair of Gershwin selections, 'I've Got a Crush on You' and 'A Foggy Day'. The influence of Art Tatum is apparent with Peterson's darting runs in 'Like Someone in Love'."

The Penguin Guide to Jazz included the album in its suggested "Core Collection".

== Track listing ==
1. "At Long Last Love" (Cole Porter) – 4:56 (Recorded April 24, 1964)
2. "Easy Walker" (Billy Taylor) – 9:36 (Recorded April 24, 1964)
3. "Tin Tin Deo" (Gil Fuller, Chano Pozo) – 5:34 (Recorded April 24, 1964)
4. "I've Got a Crush on You" (George Gershwin, Ira Gershwin) – 5:15 (Recorded March 27, 1963)
5. "A Foggy Day" (G. Gershwin, I. Gershwin) – 4:35 (Recorded March 27, 1963)
6. "Like Someone in Love" (Johnny Burke, Jimmy Van Heusen) – 11:18 (Recorded March 27, 1963)

== Personnel ==
- Oscar Peterson – piano
- Ray Brown – double bass
- Ed Thigpen – drums
