= The Way I Really Play =

Studio album by Oscar Peterson
- Released: 1968
- Recorded: November 12, 1967
- Genre: Jazz
- Length: 44:50
- Label: MPS
- Producer: Hans Georg Brunner-Schwer

Oscar Peterson chronology
Action (1968)	The Way I Really Play (1968)	Girl Talk (1968)

The Way I Really Play (also released as The Great Oscar Peterson on Prestige!) is a 1968 album by jazz pianist Oscar Peterson. It is the third part of Peterson's Exclusively for My Friends series.

== Reception ==
Professional ratings
Review scores
Source	Rating
AllMusic	3.5/5 stars
The Penguin Guide to Jazz Recordings	3/4 stars
The Rolling Stone Jazz Record Guide	3/5 stars

Writing for AllMusic, critic Ken Dryden wrote "The influence of Art Tatum is apparent during his intricate runs within "Love Is Here to Stay," while the multifaceted original "Sandy's Blues" (dedicated to his wife) combines a dark mood with a swinging setting. The lighthearted waltzing treatment of "Alice in Wonderland" is pure joy, while another original, "Noreen's Nocturne," is simply a showstopper."

The Penguin Guide to Jazz includes the album in its selected "Core Collection."

== Track listing ==
1. "Waltzing Is Hip" (Ray Brown, Johnny Wayne) – 6:11
2. "Satin Doll" (Duke Ellington, Johnny Mercer, Billy Strayhorn) – 10:05
3. "Love Is Here to Stay" (George Gershwin, Ira Gershwin) – 4:54
4. "Sandy's Blues" (Oscar Peterson) – 9:34
5. "Alice in Wonderland" (Sammy Fain, Bob Hilliard) – 4:46
6. "Noreen's Nocturne" (Oscar Peterson) – 9:20

== Personnel ==
Recorded at the private studio of Hans Georg Brunner-Schwer, Villingen-Schwenningen, West Germany, November 12, 1967 Performance

- Oscar Peterson – piano
- Sam Jones – double bass
- Bobby Durham – drums

Production

- Recording director and engineer - Hans Georg Brunner-Schwer
- Liner notes - Gene Lees
- Liner notes translated - Dr. B. Falk
- Cover photography - Sepp Werkmeister
- Reverse side photography - Sepp Werkmeister
- Graphic work - Hans B. Piltzer
