= My Favorite Instrument =

Studio album by Oscar Peterson
- Released: 1968
- Recorded: April, 1968
- Studio: Hans Georg Brunner-Schwer Studio, Villingen-Schwenningen, West Germany
- Genre: Jazz
- Length: 40:53
- Label: MPS, (Soul-O! released on Prestige Records). Verve (reissue)
- Producer: Hans Georg Brunner-Schwer

Oscar Peterson chronology
Girl Talk (1968)	My Favorite Instrument (1968)	Travelin' On (1968)

My Favorite Instrument (also released as Soul-O!) is a 1968 album by jazz pianist Oscar Peterson. It was his first solo piano release.

== Reception ==
Professional ratings
Review scores
Source	Rating
Allmusic	5/5 stars
The Penguin Guide to Jazz Recordings	4/4 stars

Writing for AllMusic, critic Scott Yanow wrote "A prelude to his outstanding Pablo recordings, My Favorite Instrument is one of Peterson's top albums of the 1960s." This album was the fourth part of Peterson's Exclusively for My Friends series on MPS.

The Penguin Guide to Jazz included the album in its suggested "Core Collection".

== Track listing ==
1. "Someone to Watch over Me" (George Gershwin, Ira Gershwin) – 4:18
2. "Perdido" (Ervin Drake, Hans Jan Lengsfelder, Juan Tizol) – 6:17
3. "Body and Soul" (Frank Eyton, Johnny Green, Edward Heyman, Robert Sour) – 4:36
4. "Who Can I Turn To (When Nobody Needs Me)" (Leslie Bricusse, Anthony Newley) – 5:02
5. "Bye Bye Blackbird" (Mort Dixon, Ray Henderson) – 4:56
6. "I Should Care" (Sammy Cahn, Axel Stordahl, Paul Weston) – 4:48
7. "Lulu's Back In Town" (Al Dubin, Harry Warren) – 2:10
8. "Little Girl Blue" (Lorenz Hart, Richard Rodgers) – 6:07
9. "Take the "A" Train" (Billy Strayhorn) – 2:39

== Personnel ==
Performance

- Oscar Peterson – piano

Production

- Hans Georg Brunner-Schwer - music production
- Gene Lees - liner notes
- Hans B. Pfitzer - design
- Sepp Werkmeister - photography
