= Motions and Emotions =

Studio album by Oscar Peterson
- Released: 1969
- Genre: Jazz
- Length: 36:51
- Label: MPS
- Producer: Claus Ogerman, Matthias Kunnecke

Oscar Peterson chronology
Mellow Mood (1969)	Motions and Emotions (1969)	Exclusively for My Friends (1970)

Professional ratings
Review scores
Source	Rating
AllMusic	3/5 stars
The Rolling Stone Jazz Record Guide	3/5 stars

Motions and Emotions is a 1969 studio album by pianist Oscar Peterson, arranged by Claus Ogerman.

== Track listing ==
1. "Sally's Tomato" (Henry Mancini) – 3:11
2. "Sunny" (Bobby Hebb) – 3:33
3. "By the Time I Get to Phoenix (Jimmy Webb) – 4:26
4. "Wandering" (Gayle Caldwell) – 2:58
5. "This Guy's in Love with You" (Burt Bacharach, Hal David) – 3:50
6. "Wave" (Antonio Carlos Jobim) – 6:05
7. "Dreamsville" (Ray Evans, Jay Livingston, Mancini) – 3:01
8. "Yesterday" (Lennon–McCartney) – 3:59
9. "Eleanor Rigby" (Lennon, McCartney) – 3:09
10. "Ode to Billie Joe" (Bobbie Gentry) – 2:39

== Personnel ==
- Oscar Peterson – piano
- Bucky Pizzarelli – guitar
- Sam Jones – bass
- Bobby Durham – drums

Production

- Matthias Kunnecke – producer
- Claus Ogerman – producer, conductor, orchestral arrangements
- David Nadien – concert master
- Dave Green – engineer
- Hans Georg Brunner-Schwer – engineer, remastering supervisor
- Willem Makkee – digital remastering
