= Glenn Gould Foundation =

Canadian charitable organization

The Glenn Gould Foundation
- The Glenn Gould Foundation
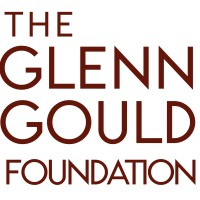
- Formation: 1983
- Founded: 19 September 1983
- Founder: Friends, colleagues and admirers of Glenn Gould
- Purpose: Arts, Music, Education and communications, and arts education
- Headquarters: Toronto
- Locations: Canada; United States
- Region served: Global
- Board Chair (Canada): Brendan Calder
- Board Chair (U.S.): Paul M. Hoffert
- Board of directors: Canada: The Rt. Hon. Kim Campbell, The Rt. Hon. Beverley McLachlin, Phyllis Clark, Dana Montalbano, Richard J. Balfour, John Kim Bell, John Dirks, Christine Elliott, Larry Fichtner, Roger Garland, Valerie Ha. . United States: Gary Hanson, Dory Vanderhoof, Frank O. Gehry, Bob Greenberg, Zarin Mehta, Moshe Safdie, Richard Saul Wurman, Benjamin Jain
- Website: https://www.glenngould.ca/

The Glenn Gould Foundation is a registered Canadian charitable organization based in Toronto, Ontario, Canada. Friends, colleagues and admirers of the celebrated Canadian pianist Glenn Gould established the foundation in 1983 after his death on October 4, 1982, at age 50. Its directors and supporters include many Canadian and International cultural leaders and patrons.

The foundation presents and partners with other to develop projects that celebrate Glenn Gould, his legacy and the arts. In this way, the foundation has been associated with numerous educational initiatives, concerts, broadcasts, publications, exhibitions, conferences and artistic creations in Canada and abroad.

== History ==
The Glenn Gould Memorial Foundation, as it was called in the first couple of years, was established in September 1983 in Toronto, Ontario, Canada, to honor Glenn Gould and extend his legacy in many creative directions. The foundation's initial focus was on the explosion of worldwide interest in Gould's life, work and ideas.

The foundation's earliest project was the creation of The Glenn Gould Prize, which was administered by the Canada Council for the Arts until 2000.

In 1985, the foundation created the international Friends of Glenn Gould society and its two related publications, GlennGould, a semi-annual magazine, and The Gould Standard, a quarterly newsletter. GlennGould published 13 volumes and ceased publication in Fall 2008.

The first symposium was held in Montreal in 1987.

In 1992, the foundation produced its first major international conference titled Music & Communication in the 21st Century: Variations on Themes of Glenn Gould, to mark the sixtieth birthday of Gould and the tenth anniversary of his death. Delegates and specialists from several countries met to carry forward Gould's ideas and investigations into the nature of music and its transmission. The five-day program covered themes that included Music as a Language of the 21st Century; Music and Creativity; The Technology of Future Musical Communication; and Music as an Instrument of Change in the 21st Century.

Papers and records of the foundation, from its inception up to 1994 are held in the Library and Archives Canada, under the archival number MUS 236.

The Glenn Gould Gathering, held September 22–26, 1999 in Toronto, was a conference of delegates from 19 countries, and included a gala dinner celebrating Gould's birthday; the presentation of the sixth Glenn Gould Prize to Yo-Yo Ma and the Glenn Gould Protégé Prize to Wu Man; and a nationally telecast unveiling of Gould's sculpture created by Ruth Abernethy.

The Year of Glenn Gould ran from September 25, 2007, to September 24, 2008, and marked the 75th birthday of Glenn Gould, the 25th anniversary of his death, and ended with the 25th anniversary of the foundation. It was celebrated worldwide with events throughout the year.

== U.S Foundation ==
The Glenn Gould Foundation, Inc., was established in 2009 in the US, with a parallel mission. Donations made to The Glenn Gould Foundation, Inc., receive a tax receipt in US dollars.

== The Glenn Gould Prize ==
Created by The Glenn Gould Foundation, the Glenn Gould Prize is an international award to a living individual of any nationality for a body of worked that has enriched the human condition through the arts. in the arts and communications. It is awarded every second year.

Nominations are submitted by the general public in an open nomination process. Eligible nominees can come from any discipline or field in the arts.

Laureates receive a cash award of C$100,000 and are charged with selecting the recipient of The Glenn Gould Protégé Prize.

The Glenn Gould Prize is presented to the laureates and protégés in a series of celebratory events that reflect the artistic, social, humanitarian and educational impact of the particular laureate, and embody the goals of the Prize: "Celebration, Inspiration, Transformation."

A portrait of each Laureate is added to a permanent collection of photographs, on display in the lower lobby of The Glenn Gould Studio at the Canadian Broadcasting Centre in Toronto.

Laureates

- 2022 Gustavo Dudamel
- 2020 Alanis Obomsawin
- 2018 Jessye Norman
- 2015 Philip Glass
- 2013 Robert Lepage
- 2011 Leonard Cohen
- 2008 José Antonio Abreu
- 2005 André Previn
- 2002 Pierre Boulez
- 1999 Yo-Yo Ma
- 1996 Toru Takemitsu
- 1993 Oscar Peterson
- 1990 Yehudi Menuhin
- 1987 R. Murray Schafer

=== The Glenn Gould Protégé Prize ===
In 1993, the foundation expanded The Glenn Gould Prize to include The Glenn Gould Protégé Prize. As part of The Glenn Gould Prize, each Laureate is asked to select an outstanding young musician with the promise of an exceptional lifetime contribution to the art, from anywhere in the world, to receive The Glenn Gould Protégé Prize.

The Protégé Prize, awarded at the same time as The Glenn Gould Prize, is a cash award of C$25,000.

Protégés

- 2020 Victoria Anderson-Gardner
- 2018 Cécile McLorin Salvant
- 2015 Timo Andres
- 2013 L'orchestre d'hommes-orchestre
- 2011 The Children of Sistema Toronto
- 2008 Gustavo Dudamel
- 2005 Roman Patkoló
- 2002 Jean-Guihen Queyras
- 1999 Wu Man
- 1996 Tan Dun
- 1993 Benny Green

=== International Jury ===
The Prize jury changes for each award, and typically consists of renowned artists, arts professionals and patrons representing various disciplines from around the world. Immediately after the jury vote, a press conference is held to announce the recipient of the Glenn Gould Prize.

=== The Glenn Gould Prize Sculpture ===
Beginning in 1999, each Laureate and Protégé also receive The Glenn Gould Prize Sculpture, a miniature bronze sculpture of Glenn Gould created by Ontario sculptor, Ruth Abernethy.

=== Glenn Gould Prize Objets d'Art ===
From 1987 to 2002, the Glenn Gould Prize was accompanied by a work of art, created by a prominent Canadian artist commissioned by the Glenn Gould Foundation. All works of art associated with the Glenn Gould Prize were deposited in the name of each Laureate with the Canadian Museum of Civilization in Hull, Quebec, where they are publicly displayed and toured by the museum, as a further expression of honour associated with the Glenn Gould Prize.

- 2002 – A ceramic work, Imari Vase with Bouquet of Red Roses, created by Léopold L. Foulem of Caraquet, New Brunswick in honour of Pierre Boulez
- 1999 – Light Vibrations, a mixed media sculpture, created by Catherine Widgery of Montreal, Quebec in honour of Yo-Yo Ma
- 1996 – A "Musical Box" made of different raw materials such as hemp, bone, wood, metal, skin and stone, created by Gordon Peteran of Toronto, Ontario in honour of Toru Takemitsu
- 1993 – A mahogany and ebony box containing the original score for Magic Songs by R. Murray Schafer, created by Robert Diemert of Dundas, Ontario in honour of Oscar Peterson, C.C.
- 1990 – A silver and gold cloisonné enameled plaque created by Faye Rooke of Burlington, Ontario in honour of Lord Menuhin
- 1987 – A silver rose bowl with stone and wood inlays created by Donald Stuart of Barrie, Ontario in honour of R. Murray Schafer

=== Glenn Gould Prize Fund ===
The Glenn Gould Prize Fund was established by the Glenn Gould Foundation and launched by a cornerstone contribution from the late Floyd S. Chalmers, C.C. The proceeds of the 1985 International Bach Competition, held in Toronto, were added to the prize fund. Other contributors include the Government of Canada, the Government of Ontario, the City of Toronto, the Municipality of Metropolitan Toronto and a number of individuals and foundations. The fund was managed by the Canada Council for the Arts until 2000 and is today administered by the Glenn Gould Foundation.

== Glenn Gould Prize Celebration of Music Week ==
On July 29, 2009, the Glenn Gould Foundation announced the Glenn Gould Prize Celebration of Music Week in celebration of the awarding of the Eighth Glenn Gould Prize to José Antonio Abreu.

The schedule of events is as follows:

- Monday, October 26, 2009 - Glenn Gould Prize Gala
  - Four Seasons Centre for the Performing Arts, 8 p.m.
  - Featuring Símon Bolívar Youth Orchestra of Venezuela conducted by Gustavo Dudamel
  - Attended by Dr. José Antonio Abreu
- Tuesday, October 27, 2009 - High School Tour and Performances
  - Q&A with members of the Símon Bolívar Youth Orchestra of Venezuela
  - Various High Schools throughout Toronto
- Community Outreach Tour
  - Q&A with members of the Símon Bolívar Youth Orchestra of Venezuela
  - Community agencies that serve at-risk youth with music education
- Integral House Reception
  - Exclusive reception at Toronto architectural landmark Integral House
  - Introducing community leaders to the idea of El Sistema
- Wednesday, October 28, 2009 - The Promise of Music Symposium Day co-presented by the Glenn Gould Foundation, The SOCAN Foundation and The Royal Conservatory of Music
  - Telus Centre at The Royal Conservatory of Music, All day
  - Keynote speaker: Dr. José Antonio Abreu
- Open rehearsal with the Símon Bolívar Youth Orchestra of Venezuela
  - For a student audience
- Venezuelan Brass Ensemble
  - 60-member all-star virtuosos brass ensemble
  - Koerner Hall at The Royal Conservatory of Music, 8 p.m.
- Thursday, October 29, 2009 - Youth Concert for over 14,700 students from across Ontario
  - Símon Bolívar Youth Orchestra of Venezuela
  - Rogers Centre, 11:30am
