= Glenn Gould Prize =

International arts award

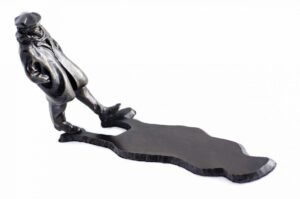
The Glenn Gould Prize sculpture is an original work, created by Canadian artist, Ruth Abernethy. It depicts a solitary Gould, walking on a late winter’s day, with the sun low in the sky, forming an elongated bronze shadow at the base of the figure.

Created by The Glenn Gould Foundation, The Glenn Gould Prize is an international arts award. The award is named after the Canadian pianist Glenn Gould.

== Description ==
Originally awarded every three years, and now biennially, the Prize is presented to a living individual of any nationality, in recognition of a body of work that has enriched the human condition through the arts, taking into account such factors as transcendent artistry, innovation, influence on a given artistic discipline or the culture at large, and humanitarian achievements.

An international jury of distinguished artists, arts professionals, and arts patrons selects the prize Laureate.

== Award ==
Originally Laureates received a cash award of C$50,000, a sum raised to C$100,000 in 2013. Each Laureate is charged with selecting the recipient of The Glenn Gould Protégé Prize. Protégés receive C$15,000, and both winners and protégés receive a small bronze sculpture of Glenn Gould made by Canadian sculptor Ruth Abernethy.

== Celebratory activity ==
In the year following each Laureate’s selection, the Foundation organizes a series of celebratory activities that highlight the unique contributions of the winner, both to the arts and society. These have included concerts, art exhibitions, street performances, symposia, multimedia celebrations, book publication, educational activities, film screenings, theatrical performances, broadcasts and master classes. Prize celebrations have lasted as long as two weeks and have included as many as 25 individual events to audiences up to 24,000, generating tens of millions of media impressions. The Glenn Gould Prize is presented to the laureates and protégés in a series of celebratory events that reflect the artistic, social, humanitarian and educational impact of the particular laureate, and embody the goals of the Prize: "Celebration, Inspiration, Transformation."

A portrait of each laureate is also displayed in Toronto at the Glenn Gould Studio of the Canadian Broadcasting Corporation.

== Jury ==
The Prize jury changes for each award, and typically consists of renowned artists, arts professionals and patrons representing various disciplines from around the world.

== Funding ==
The prize is funded by The Glenn Gould Prize Fund, which was established through the courtesy of Floyd S. Chalmers, with contributions by numerous administrations and foundations, including the Government of Canada. The main provider was the Canada Council, and since 2000 it has been the foundation itself.

== Winners ==
The Twelfth laureate of the Glenn Gould Prize is soprano, activist and humanitarian Jessye Norman. Jury celebrations took place at Koerner Hall, in Toronto, Ontario, Canada in April, 2018. The winner of The Glenn Gould Protégé Prize is American jazz vocalist Cécile McLorin Salvant.

The Twelfth Glenn Gould Prize presentation was made on February 20, 2019 at the Four Seasons Centre, featuring the Orchestra of the Canadian Opera Company, a host of international guest artists and conductors, and Prize Jury Chair Viggo Mortensen. The Prize concert was the culmination of 12 days of educational, cultural and socially significant events honoring Ms. Norman during Black History Month.

== Awards ==
Laureates

- 1987 R. Murray Schafer, Canada
- 1990 Yehudi Menuhin, US/Swiss/Britain
- 1993 Oscar Peterson, Canada
- 1996 Toru Takemitsu, Japan
- 1999 Yo-Yo Ma, France/United States
- 2002 Pierre Boulez, France
- 2005 André Previn, Germany/United States
- 2008 José Antonio Abreu, Venezuela
- 2011 Leonard Cohen, Canada
- 2013 Robert Lepage, Canada
- 2015 Philip Glass, United States
- 2018 Jessye Norman, United States
- 2020 Alanis Obomsawin, Canada
- 2022 Gustavo Dudamel, Venezuela
- 2025 Elton John, United Kingdom

Protégés

- 1993 Benny Green
- 1996 Tan Dun
- 1999 Wu Man
- 2002 Jean-Guihen Queyras
- 2005 Roman Patkoló
- 2008 Gustavo Dudamel
- 2011 The Children of Sistema Toronto
- 2013 L'orchestre d'hommes-orchestres
- 2015 Timo Andres
- 2018 Cécile McLorin Salvant
- 2020 Victoria Anderson-Gardner
- 2025 Emily D'Angelo
