= National Arts Center (disambiguation) =

National Arts Center, National Arts Centre, etc. may refer to:

- National Arts Centre (performing arts organisation) in Ottawa, Ontario, Canada
  - National Arts Centre (building) in Ottawa, Ontario, Canada
- The National Art Center, Tokyo, also known as The National Art Center, in Japan
- The National Arts Center is in Los Baños, Laguna, Philippines.
