= National Arts Centre (building) =

Performing arts centre in Ontario, Canada

- Centre national des Arts
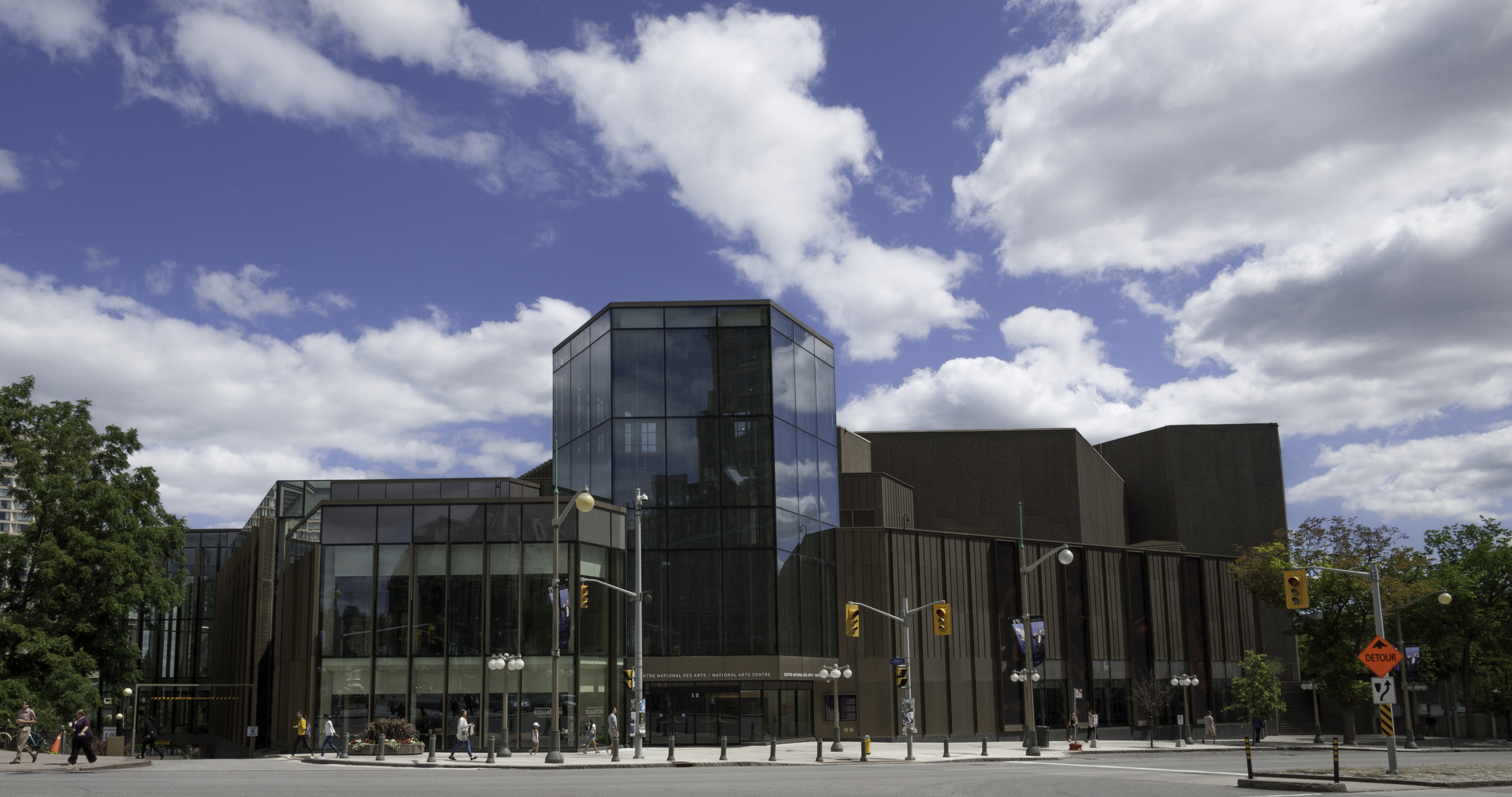
- Interactive map of National Arts Centre
- Address: 1 Elgin Street
- Location: Ottawa, Ontario, Canada
- Coordinates: 45°25′23″N 075°41′38″W
- Owner: Government of Canada
- Capacity: 3,677 (1969–2017); 3,423 (2017–2025); 3,411 (2025–present)
- Type: Arts centre
- Public transit: Rideau; Parliament

Construction
- Groundbreaking: 1965
- Opened: May 31, 1969
- Renovated: 2017
- Cost: $46 million
- Architect: Fred Lebensold

National Historic Site of Canada
- Official name: National Arts Centre National Historic Site of Canada
- Designated: 2006
- Reference no.: 9091

The National Arts Centre (NAC) (French: Centre national des Arts) is a Canadian centre for the performing arts located in Ottawa, Ontario, along the Rideau Canal. It is operated by the eponymous performing arts organisation National Arts Centre. The National Arts Centre was designated a National Historic Site of Canada in 2006.

== History ==
In 1928, the National Capital Commission expropriated and demolished the Russell Theatre to make way for Confederation Square, leaving Ottawa without a major performing arts venue. Performers and orchestras visiting the capital were required to use the stage of the Capitol Cinema, which had been designed for vaudeville and films. In 1963, G. Hamilton Southam and Levi Pettler founded the National Capital Arts Alliance with the goal of creating a suitable venue. They successfully convinced the city and government to build the new centre downtown on Elgin Street and the Rideau Canal.

The NAC was one of a number of projects launched by the government of Lester B. Pearson to commemorate Canada's 1967 centenary. It opened its doors to the public for the first time on May 31, 1969, at a cost of C$46 million. The site at one time was home to Ottawa City Hall, and the city donated the land to the federal government. In June 2010, Queen Elizabeth II unveiled a life-size bronze statue of the Canadian jazz pianist Oscar Peterson outside the NAC during her royal tour of Canada.

== Architecture ==
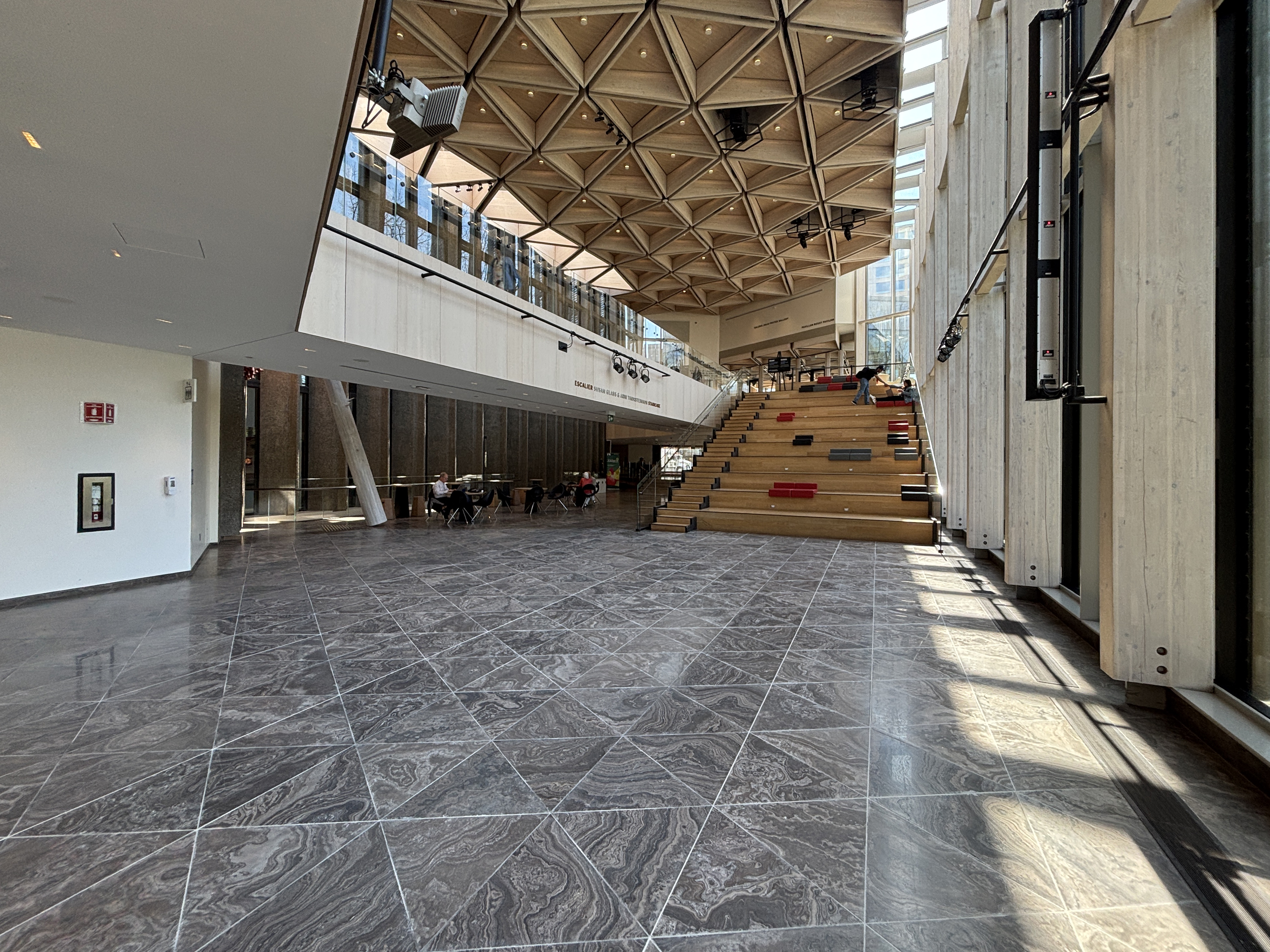
Lobby after renovation in 2017

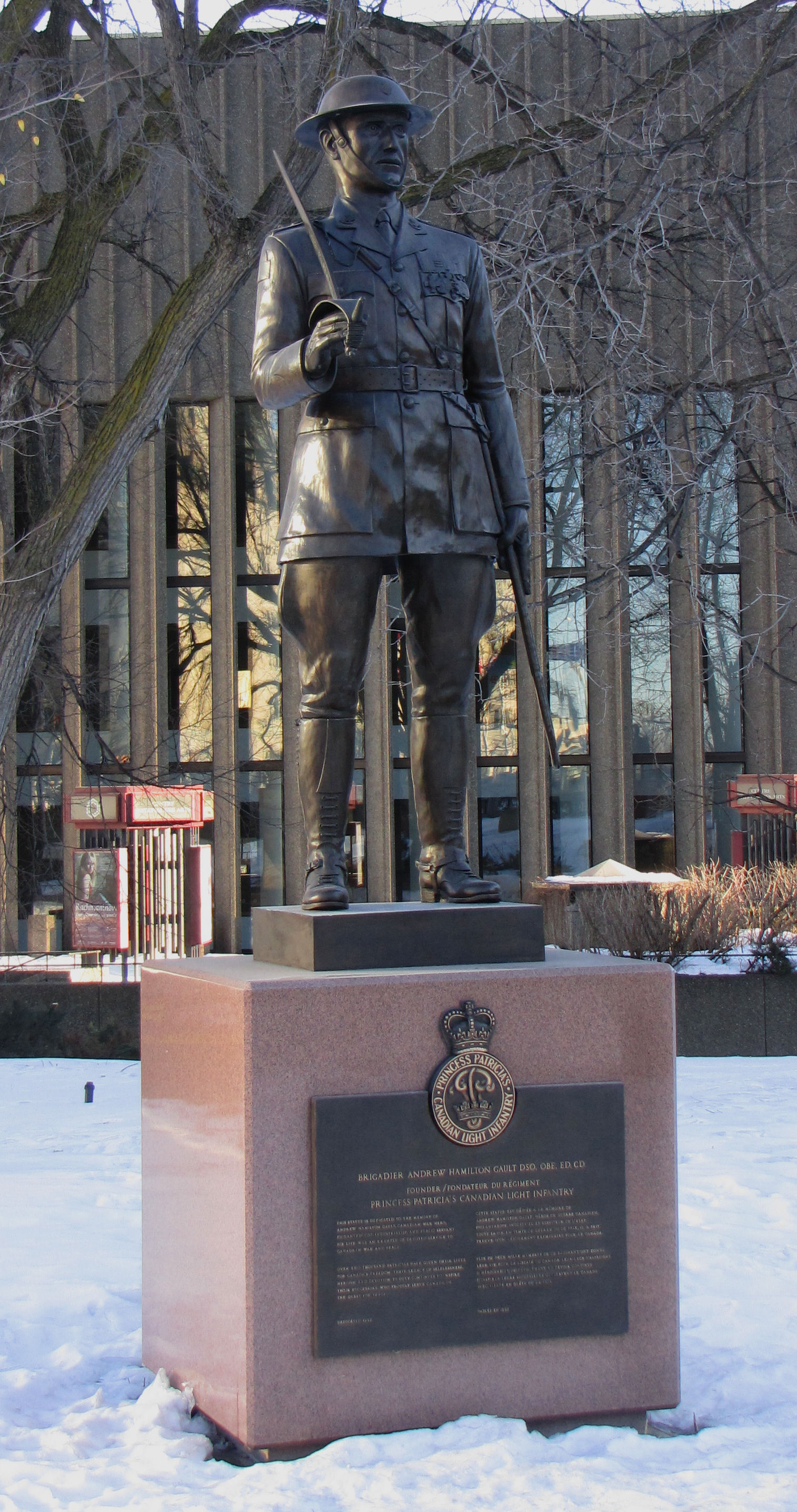
Statue of Brigadier Andrew Gault in front of National Arts Centre in Ottawa, Ontario Canada

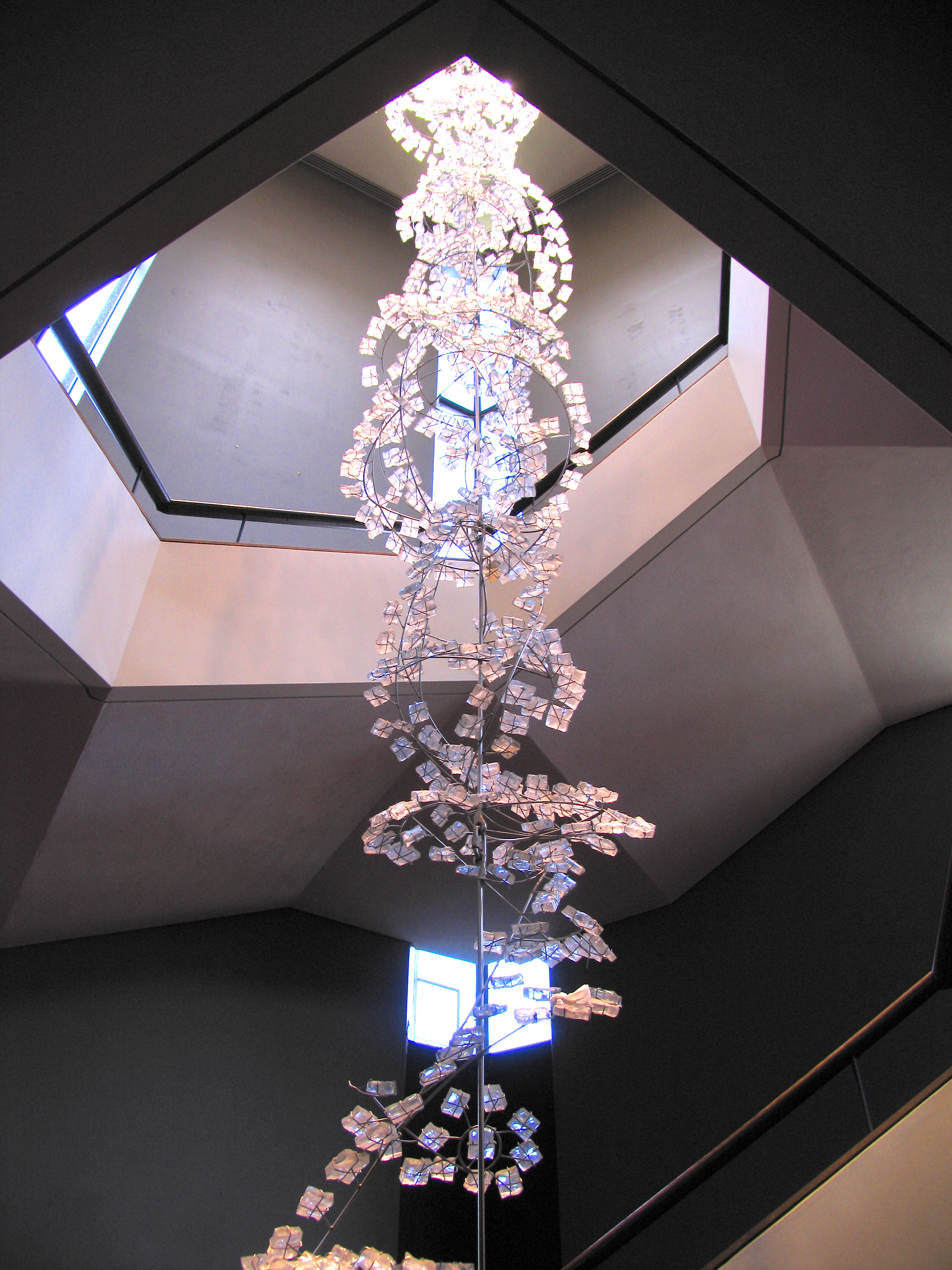
Interior view of National Arts Centre in Ottawa, Ontario showing suspended glass sculpture Crystal DNA

The building, designed by Fred Lebensold, is in the Brutalist style and is based on the shape of a triangle and hexagon. The building is constructed of reinforced concrete. The exterior and many interior walls are faced with precast concrete panels containing exposed aggregate of crushed brown Laurentian granite. The centre rises from a base that sits on a 950-space underground parking garage. The base houses offices, lobbies, dressing rooms, rehearsal halls, workshops, kitchens and a restaurant. The site slopes from Elgin Street to the Rideau Canal allowing for a second underground level overlooking the canal. The roof of the base forms a multi-level terrace containing gardens that are open to the public and connects to the Mackenzie King Bridge. The three main performance spaces rise from the base as a series of hexagonal structures also faced with brown precast panels in a variety of textures. Windows are tall, narrow slits framed by vertical ribs. The hexagonal theme flows through the interior and appears in ceilings, light fixtures and flooring. Lobbies and stairwells house several major pieces of visual art.

Plans for the centre included an organ in Southam Hall; however, funding did not permit this. On March 17, 1970, the 25th anniversary of the liberation of the Netherlands, a Dutch-Canadian Committee presented two organs purchased as the result of its Operation Thankyou Canada. The 21-stop concert organ and positiv organ were both constructed by the Flentrop Orgelbouw of Zaandam and given in gratitude for the role played by Canadian troops in the liberation of the Netherlands. The concert organ premiered in a recital October 7, 1973 by Albert de Klerk.

In 2000, the NAC was named by the Royal Architectural Institute of Canada as one of the top 500 buildings produced in Canada during the last millennium.

In 2014, Heritage Minister Shelly Glover and Foreign Affairs Minister John Baird announced a $110 million facelift of the NAC. At construction, the centre was oriented toward a planned lagoon on the east, which was never constructed. The work would expand meeting and event facilities, install entrances and windows to reorient the focus toward Parliament Hill, and upgrade washroom facilities. The renovated centre opened on July 1, 2017 for Canada's 150th Anniversary.

== Performance facilities ==
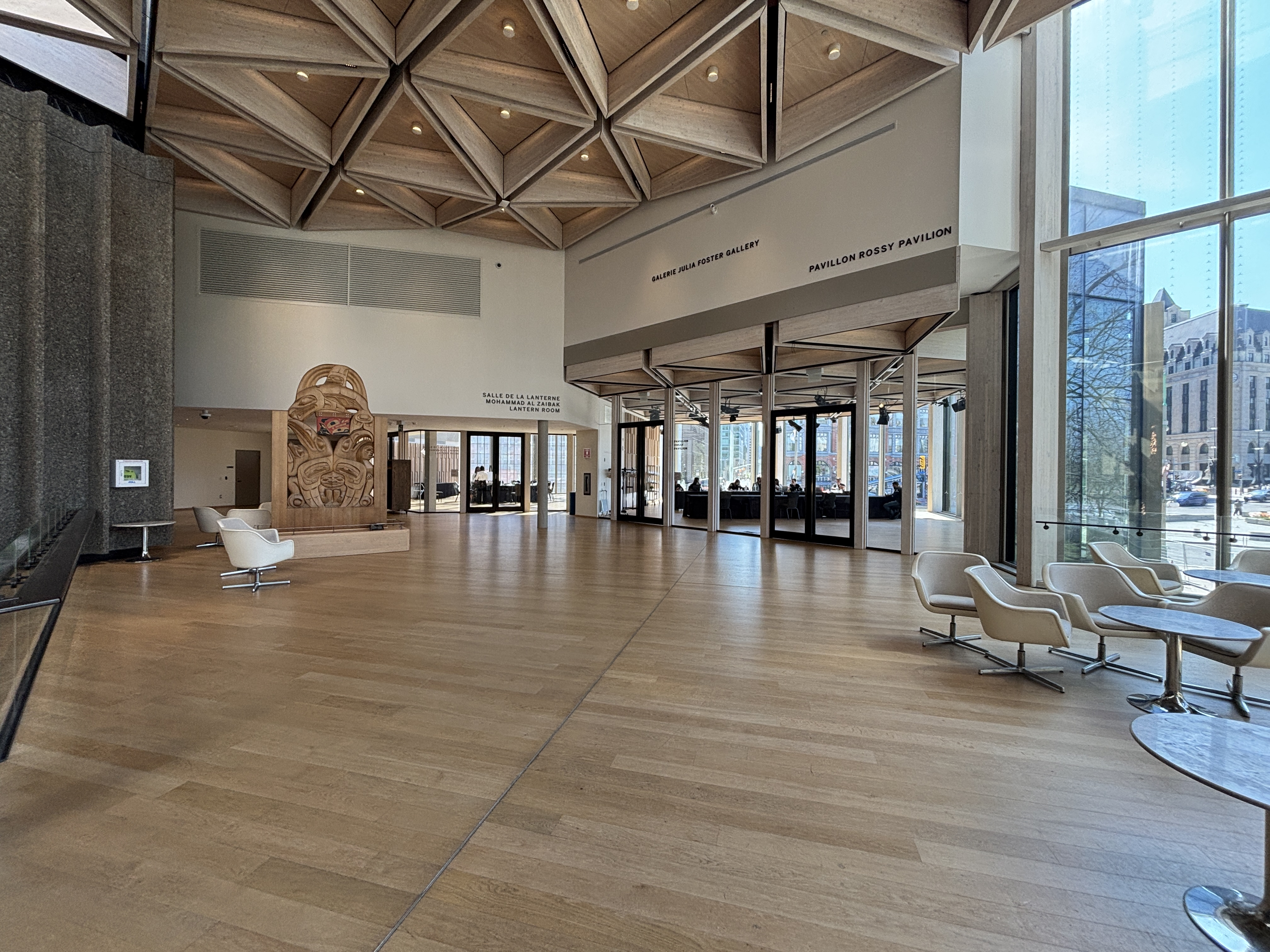
Gallery

The NAC has four concert venues:

- Southam Hall, with 2,065 seats, is the largest stage and is home to the National Arts Centre Orchestra, the Ottawa Symphony Orchestra as well as ballet, opera and other major visiting shows and productions.
- Babs Asper Theatre, with 885 seats, is mostly used for theatre and dance events, plus some concerts. It is home to the Indigenous, English-language and French-language theatre companies.
- Azrieli Studio, with 307 seats, is a theatre venue and musical concert space suited for performances requiring a more intimate space.
- Fourth Stage, with 154 chairs, opened in 2001 and was completely rebuilt in 2016–17, reopening in October, 2017. It is home to most NAC Presents concerts and a wide variety of community programming.

== See also ==
- List of concert halls
