= Goffredo Cappa =

Italian luthier

Goffredo Cappa (1644–1717), also known as Gioffredo Cappa, Iofredus Cappa or Jofredus Cappa, was an Italian luthier, known for his violins and cellos.

Cappa was born in Saluzzo. After working with the Amati family in Cremona he set up his own workshop in Saluzzo. He died in Saluzzo,6 August 1717

== Contemporary players ==
- Meta Weiss plays a cello made in 1690
- Amiram Ganz from the Altenberg Trio plays a violin made in 1686
- Luca Fanfoni plays a violin made in 1694
- Geneviève Laurenceau plays a violin made in 1700
- Jean-Guihen Queyras plays a cello made in 1696
- Elizabeth Layton plays a violin made in 1732
- Stéphane Grappelli played a violin made in 1695
