= Jessye Norman =

American opera singer (1945–2019)

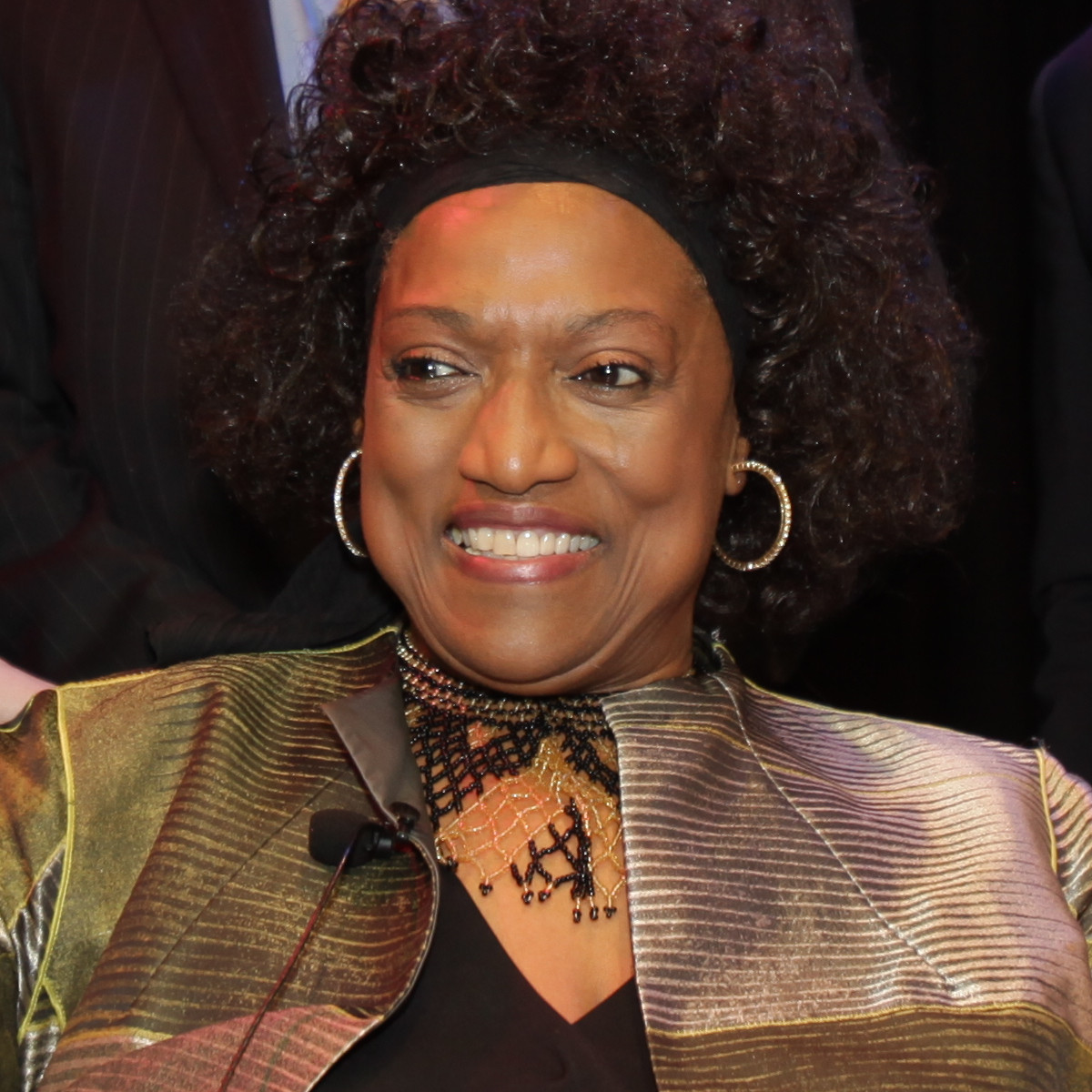
- Norman in 2014
- Born: Jessye Mae Norman; September 15, 1945; Augusta, Georgia, U.S.
- Died: September 30, 2019 (aged 74); New York City, U.S.
- Education: Howard University (BM); Peabody Institute; University of Michigan (MM)
- Occupation: Operatic soprano
- Years active: 1968–2019
- Awards: Grammy Lifetime Achievement Award; National Medal of Arts; Honorary Ambassador to the United Nations; Austrian Cross of Honour for Science and Art

Jessye Mae Norman (September 15, 1945 – September 30, 2019) was an American opera singer and recitalist. She was able to perform dramatic soprano roles, but did not limit herself to that voice type. A commanding presence on operatic, concert and recital stages, Norman was associated with roles including Beethoven's Leonore, Wagner's Sieglinde and Kundry, Berlioz's Cassandre and Didon, and Bartók's Judith. The New York Times music critic Edward Rothstein described her voice as a "grand mansion of sound" that "has enormous dimensions, reaching backward and upward. It opens onto unexpected vistas. It contains sunlit rooms, narrow passageways, cavernous halls."

Norman trained at Howard University, the Peabody Institute, and the University of Michigan. Her career began in Europe, where she won the ARD International Music Competition in Munich in 1968, which led to a contract with the Deutsche Oper Berlin. Her operatic début came as Elisabeth in Wagner's Tannhäuser, after which she sang as Verdi's Aida at La Scala in Milan. She made her first operatic appearance in the U.S. in 1982 with the Opera Company of Philadelphia, when cast as Jocasta in Stravinsky's Oedipus rex, and as Dido in Purcell's Dido and Aeneas. She went on to sing leading roles with many other companies, including the Metropolitan Opera, the Lyric Opera of Chicago, the Paris Opera, and the Royal Opera, London. Internationally well known, she was invited to sing at the second inauguration of Ronald Reagan and at Queen Elizabeth II's 60th birthday celebration in 1986 and performed La Marseillaise to celebrate the 200th anniversary of the French Revolution on July 14, 1989. She sang at the 1996 Summer Olympics opening ceremony in Atlanta and for the second inauguration of Bill Clinton in 1997.

Norman sang and recorded recitals of music by Joseph Haydn, Franz Schubert, Johannes Brahms, Richard Strauss, Gustav Mahler, Ernest Chausson, and Francis Poulenc, among others. In 1984, she won the Grammy Award for Best Classical Vocal Solo, the first of five Grammy Awards that she would collect during her career. Apart from several honorary doctorates and other awards, she received the Grammy Lifetime Achievement Award, the National Medal of Arts, the Légion d'honneur, and was named a member of the British Royal Academy of Music. In 1990, UN secretary-general Javier Pérez de Cuéllar named her Honorary Ambassador to the United Nations.

== Life and career ==
=== Early life and musical education ===
Norman was born in Augusta, Georgia, to Silas Norman, an insurance salesman, and Janie King-Norman, a schoolteacher. She was one of five children in a well-to-do Black family of amateur musicians; her mother and grandmother were both pianists, and her father sang in a local choir. Norman and all of her siblings received piano lessons as children. Norman attended Charles T. Walker Elementary School. She proved to be a talented singer as a young child, singing gospel songs at Mount Calvary Baptist Church at the age of four. At church, she was greatly influenced by the singing of two women, Mrs. Golden and Sister Childs. At the age of seven, she entered her first vocal competition, placing third because of a memory slip in the second stanza of the hymn "God Will Take Care of You". She later said in interviews, "I guess He has taken care of me. That was my last memory slip in public."

When Norman was nine she was given a radio for her birthday and soon discovered the world of opera through the weekly broadcasts of the Metropolitan Opera, which she listened to every Saturday. She started listening to recordings of Marian Anderson and Leontyne Price, both of whom Norman credited as inspiring figures in her career. She received her first formal vocal coaching from Rosa Harris Sanders Creque, who was her music teacher at A. R. Johnson Junior High School. She continued to take voice lessons privately with Ms. Sanders Creque while attending Lucy C. Laney Senior High School in downtown Augusta. (Note: She took voice lessons from her teacher and mentor Rosa Harris Sanders who recognized early on that Jessye's voice was special. It was Mrs. Sanders who arranged her audition at Howard University which secured her a scholarship. When Norman's father died, the family wanted her to leave school and come home. Mrs. Sanders arranged for a benefit concert in Augusta so Norman could stay in school.)

Norman studied at the Interlochen Center for the Arts in Northern Michigan in the opera performance program. At the age of 16, she entered the Marian Anderson Vocal Competition in Philadelphia which, although she did not win, led to an offer of a full scholarship at Howard University, in Washington, D.C. While at Howard, studying voice with Carolyn Grant, she sang in the university chorus and as a soloist at the Lincoln Temple United Church of Christ.

In 1964, she became a member of Gamma Sigma Sigma and served as president of the Alpha Eta chapter.

In 1965, along with 33 other female students and four female faculty, Norman became a founding member of the Delta Nu chapter of Sigma Alpha Iota music fraternity. In 1966, she won the National Society of Arts and Letters singing competition. After graduating in 1967 with a degree in music, she began graduate studies at the Peabody Conservatory in Baltimore and later at the University of Michigan School of Music, Theatre & Dance in Ann Arbor, Michigan, from which she earned a master's degree in 1968. During this time, Norman studied voice with Elizabeth Mannion and Pierre Bernac.

=== Early career (1968–1979) ===
After graduating, Norman, like many American young musicians at the time, moved to Europe to establish herself. In 1968, she won the ARD International Music Competition in Munich. The following year, she began a three-year contract with the Deutsche Oper Berlin, where she first appeared as Elisabeth in Wagner's Tannhäuser.

Norman performed as a guest with German and Italian opera companies, often portraying noble characters convincingly, both by appearance and by unique voice which was both flexible and powerful. Her voice range was wide, from contralto registers to dramatic soprano. In 1970, she appeared in Florence in the title role in Handel's Deborah. In 1971, she sang at the Maggio Musicale Fiorentino in the role of Sélika in Meyerbeer's L'Africaine. The same year, she portrayed Countess Almaviva in Mozart's Le nozze di Figaro, alongside Dietrich Fischer-Dieskau as the count at the Berlin Festival, and recorded the role with the BBC Orchestra conducted by Colin Davis. The recording was a finalist for the Montreux International Record Award competition and exposed her to music listeners in Europe and the United States.

In 1972, Norman made her first appearance at La Scala, where she sang the title role in Verdi's Aida and at The Royal Opera at Covent Garden, London, where she appeared as Cassandra in Les Troyens by Berlioz. Norman was Aida again in a concert version that same year in her first well-publicized American performance at the Hollywood Bowl for the venue's 50th anniversary celebration. This was followed by an all-Wagner concert at the Tanglewood Music Festival in Lenox, Massachusetts, and a recital tour of the country, after which she returned to Europe for several engagements. Norman briefly returned to the United States to give her first New York City recital as part of the "Great Performers" series in Alice Tully Hall at Lincoln Center for the Performing Arts in 1973.

In 1975, Norman moved to London and had no staged opera appearances for the next five years. She remained internationally active as a recitalist and soloist in works such as Mendelssohn's Elijah and Franck's Les Béatitudes. Norman returned to North America again in 1976 and 1977 to make an extensive concert tour. Norman toured Europe throughout the 1970s, giving recitals of works by Schubert, Mahler, Wagner, Brahms, Satie, Messiaen, and several contemporary American composers, to great critical acclaim.

=== Mid-career (1980–1989) ===
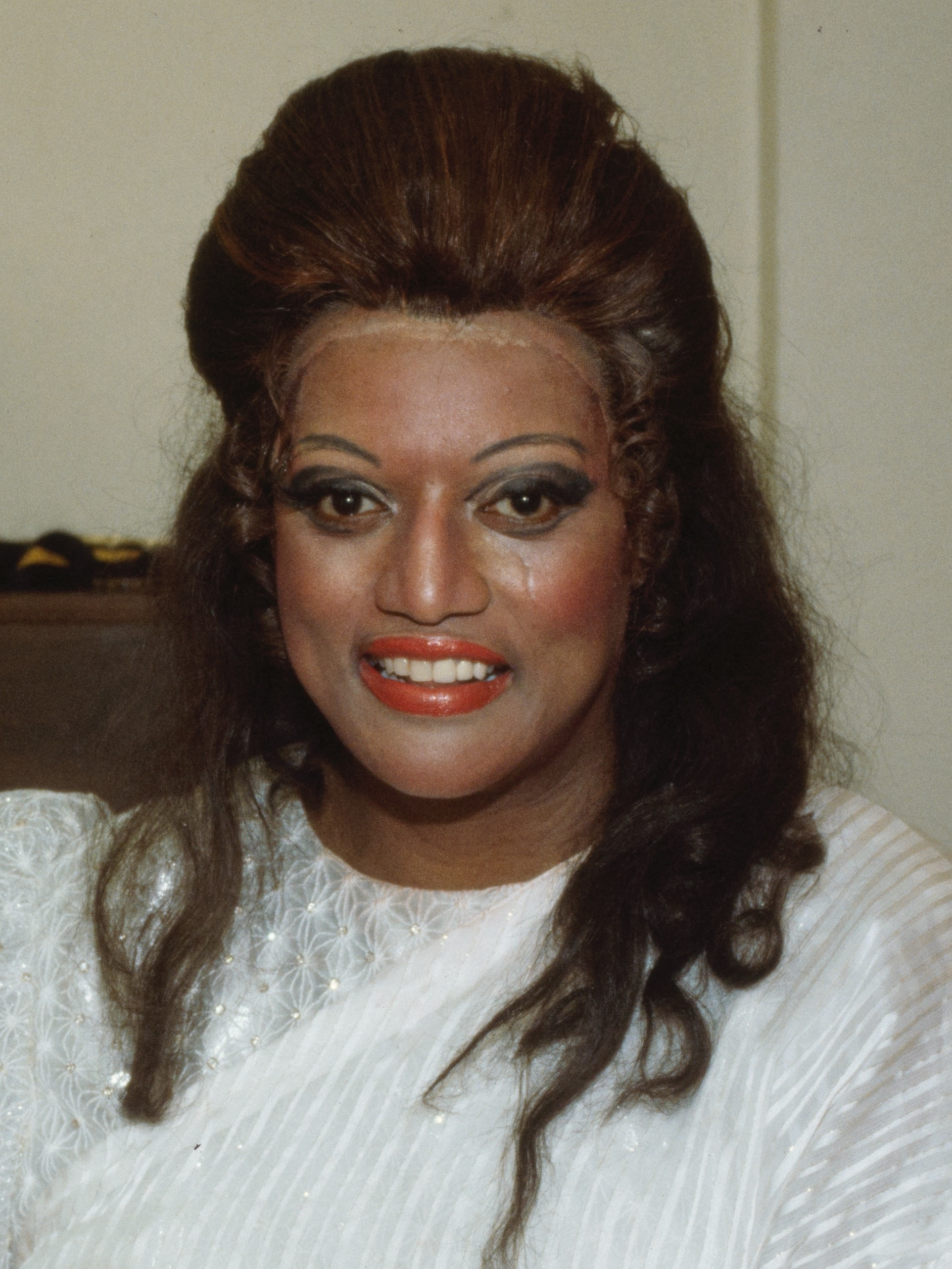
As Dido, 1982

In October 1980, Norman returned to the operatic stage in the title role of Ariadne auf Naxos by Richard Strauss at the Hamburg State Opera in Germany. Her first operatic appearance in the United States came in 1982 at the Opera Company of Philadelphia, where she appeared as Jocasta in Stravinsky's Oedipus rex, and as Purcell's Dido. On July 18 she sang Didon in a concert performance of the second part of Berlioz's Les Troyens (as Les Troyens à Carthage), conducted by Gennady Rozhdestvensky. The performance was broadcast on BBC Radio 3, and an audio recording exists.

Her stage debut at the Metropolitan Opera in New York City was on September 26, 1983, the opening night of the company's 100th-anniversary season, when she portrayed Cassandre in Berlioz's Les Troyens with Plácido Domingo as Aeneas, Tatiana Troyanos as Didon, and James Levine conducting. According to Donal Henahan, the music critic of The New York Times, "she sang grippingly and projected well, even when placed well back in the cavernous sets." The fourth performance, with the same cast, was telecast as part of the Live from the Met series. A video recording has been issued on DVD and is available for streaming at the Met Opera on Demand website. On October 12 and 17, the fifth and sixth performances in the run of nine, she sang Didon with William Lewis as Aeneas and Gwynn Cornell as Cassandre. Reviewing the October 12 performance, Edward Rothstein of The New York Times reported that "she created a Carthaginian Queen who was both regal and vulnerable. It was a subtle and affecting dramatic portrait.... Her farewell aria was fluid and seductive, suggesting in its timbre both sensuous pleasures and death." On February 8, the seventh performance of the series, she returned to the role of Cassandre, with Edward Sooter as Aeneas and Troyanos as Didon, but replaced Troyanos as Didon for act 5. On February 13, the eighth performance, she again sang Didon, with Sooter as Aeneas and Cornell as Cassandre, and on February 18, the ninth and final performance of the series, she sang both Cassandre and Didon, with Sooter as Aeneas. Regarding the last performance, The New York Times reported that "the audience gave Miss Norman a 15-minute standing ovation that brought her back to the stage more than a half dozen times." The performance was broadcast on the Metropolitan Opera Radio, and an audio recording is available.

Norman programmed recitals innovatively, including contemporary music. She commissioned the song cycle woman.life.song by composer Judith Weir, a work premiered at Carnegie Hall, with texts by Toni Morrison, Maya Angelou and Clarissa Pinkola Estés. In a review of a recital at Alice Tully Hall, Bernard Holland wrote in The New York Times that she "carefully gauged her seemingly limitless resources to fit the changing textures of her material". After a recital at Carnegie Hall, Allen Hughes wrote in the same newspaper that Norman "has one of the most opulent voices before the public today, and, as discriminating listeners are aware, her performances are backed by extraordinary preparation, both musical and otherwise."

According to Encyclopædia Britannica: "By the mid-1980s she was one of the most popular and highly regarded dramatic soprano singers in the world." She told John Gruen in an interview: "As for my voice, it cannot be categorized – and I like it that way, because I sing things that would be considered in the dramatic, mezzo or spinto range. I like so many different kinds of music that I've never allowed myself the limitations of one particular range."

She was invited to sing at the second inauguration of U.S. President Ronald Reagan on January 21, 1985; she performed "Simple Gifts" from Aaron Copland's Old American Songs at the ceremony. In 1986, Norman sang God Save the Queen for Queen Elizabeth II's 60th-birthday celebration. That same year, she appeared as a soloist in Strauss's Four Last Songs with the Berlin Philharmonic during its tour of the United States.

Over the years, Norman expanded her talent into less familiar areas. In 1988, she sang a concert performance of Poulenc's one-act opera La voix humaine ("The Human Voice"), based on Jean Cocteau's 1930 play of the same name. During the 1980s and early 1990s, Norman produced numerous award-winning recordings, and many of her performances were televised. In addition to opera, many of Norman's recordings and performances during this time focused on art songs, lieder, oratorios, and orchestral works. Her interpretation of the Four Last Songs is especially acclaimed, as "the tonal qualities of her voice were ideal for these final works of the great Romantic German lieder tradition".

Norman also performed Arnold Schoenberg's Gurre-Lieder and his one-woman opera Erwartung. In 1989, she appeared at the Metropolitan Opera for a performance of Erwartung that marked the company's first single-character production. It was presented in a double bill with Bartók's Bluebeard's Castle, with Norman playing Judith. Both operas were broadcast nationally. That same year, she was the featured soloist with Zubin Mehta and the New York Philharmonic in the opening concert of its 148th season, which PBS telecast live. She performed at the Hong Kong Cultural Centre opening and gave a recital at the National Theater and Concert Hall in Taipei.

Also in 1989, Norman was invited to sing the French national anthem, La Marseillaise, to celebrate the 200th anniversary of the French Revolution on July 14. Her rendition was delivered at the Place de la Concorde in Paris, in a costume designed by Azzedine Alaïa as part of an elaborate pageant orchestrated by avant-garde designer Jean-Paul Goude. This event was the inspiration that led the South African poet Lawrence Mduduzi Ndlovu to write a poem titled "I Shall Be Heard" dedicated to Norman. The poem appears in Ndlovu's book of poems In Quiet Realm, the foreword to which is penned by Norman.

=== Later life (1990–2019) ===
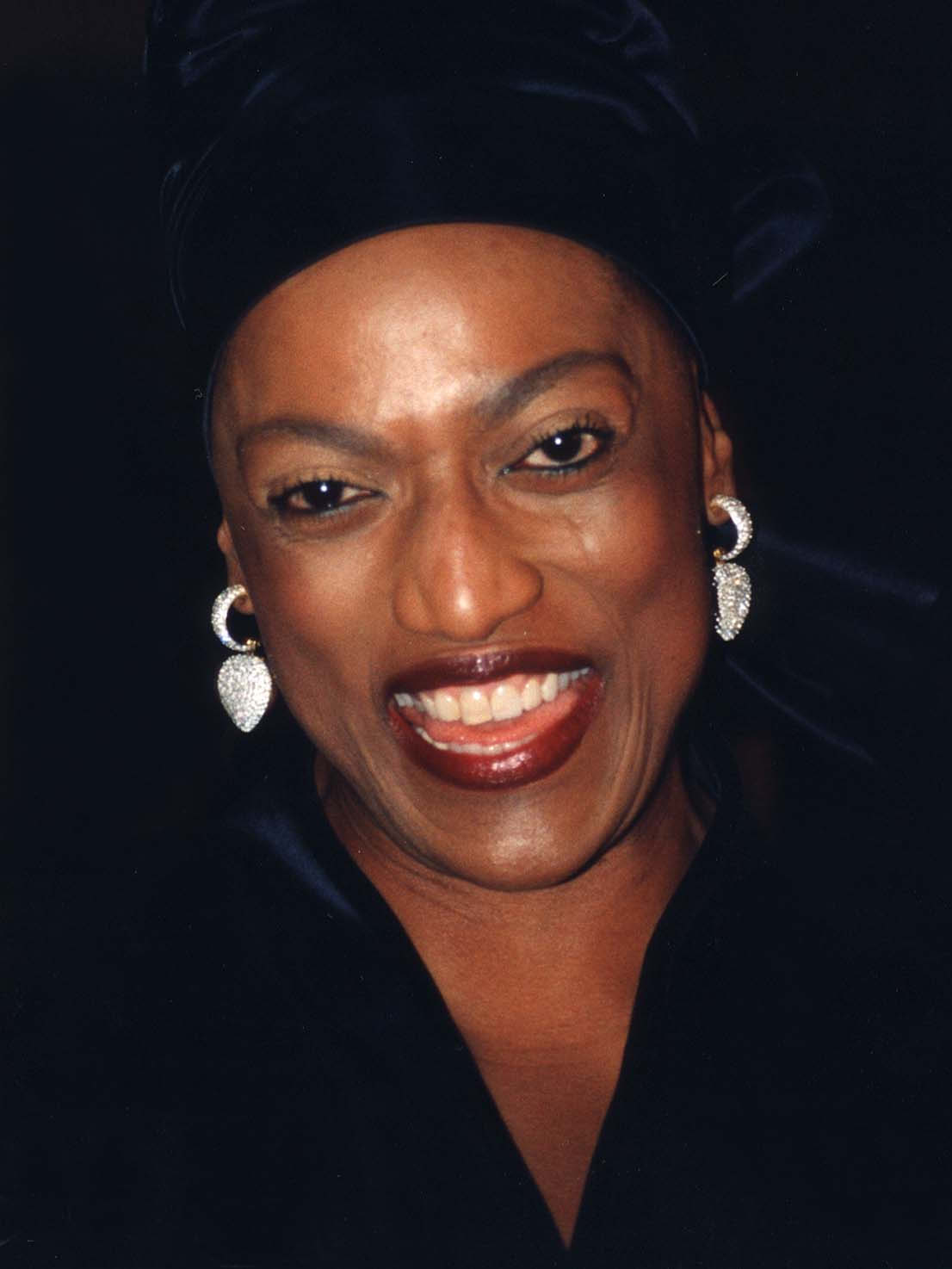
Norman in 1997

From the early 1990s, Norman lived in Croton-on-Hudson, New York, in a secluded estate known as "White Gates", which was previously owned by television personality Allen Funt. She performed at Tchaikovsky's 150th Birthday Gala in Leningrad and appeared at the Lyric Opera of Chicago in the title role of Gluck's Alceste in 1990. She sang American spirituals with soprano Kathleen Battle at Carnegie Hall that year. The following year, she performed in a concert recorded live with Lawrence Foster and the Lyon Opera Orchestra at Notre-Dame de Paris. Norman sang Jocasta in Stravinsky's Oedipus rex at the opening operatic production at the new Saito Kinen Festival in the Japanese Alps near Matsumoto in 1992. The following year, she sang the title role in the Metropolitan Opera's production of Ariadne auf Naxos. In 1994, Norman sang at the funeral of former first lady Jacqueline Kennedy Onassis. She was again the featured soloist with the New York Philharmonic, then conducted by Kurt Masur, in a gala concert telecast for the opening of the orchestra's 153rd season in 1995. She gave a highly lauded performance as the title character of Janáček's The Makropulos Affair when it was first performed at the Met in 1996.

Norman performed at the 1996 Summer Olympics opening ceremony in Atlanta, singing "Faster, Higher, Stronger". In December of the same year, she put on a benefit concert to fight AIDS with Maya Angelou, Whoopi Goldberg, Elton John, and Toni Morrison. In January 1997, she performed at the second inauguration of U.S. President Bill Clinton, singing, "Oh freedom!". In 1998, she performed a recital at Carnegie Hall incorporating sacred music by Duke Ellington, scored for jazz combo, string quartet and piano. She sang Mahler's Das Lied von der Erde, with the Boston Symphony Orchestra conducted by Seiji Ozawa. A Christmas television program was filmed in her home town. A spring recital tour in 1999 included performances in Tel Aviv. In the following season, she appeared at the Salzburg Festival.

In 1999, Norman collaborated with choreographer-dancer Bill T. Jones in a project for New York City's Lincoln Center, called "How! Do! We! Do!" In 2000, she released an album, I Was Born in Love with You, featuring the songs of Michel Legrand. The recording, reviewed as a jazz crossover project, featured Legrand on piano, Ron Carter on bass, and Grady Tate on drums. In February and March 2001, Norman was featured at Carnegie Hall in a three-part concert series. With James Levine as her pianist, the concerts were a significant arts event, replete with an 80-page program booklet featuring a newly commissioned watercolor portrait of Norman by David Hockney. In 2002, Norman performed at the opening of Singapore's Esplanade – Theatres on the Bay.

On June 28, 2001, Norman and Kathleen Battle performed Mythodea by Vangelis at the Temple of Olympian Zeus in Athens, Greece. On March 11, 2002, Norman performed "America the Beautiful" at a service unveiling two monumental columns of light at the site of the former World Trade Center, as a memorial for the victims of the September 11, 2001, terrorist attacks on New York City. In 2002, she returned to Augusta to announce that she would fund a pilot school of the arts for children in Richmond County. Classes commenced at St. John United Methodist Church in the fall of 2003. In November 2004, a documentary about Norman's life and work was directed by André Heller and Othmar Schmiderer as director of photography, documenting her music as well as political and social issues. In 2006, Norman collaborated with the modern dance choreographer Trey McIntyre for a special performance during the summer at the Vail Dance Festival.

In 2003, the Rachel Longstreet Foundation and Norman partnered to open the Jessye Norman School of the Arts, a tuition-free performing arts after-school program for economically disadvantaged students in Augusta, Georgia. Norman was actively involved in the program, including fundraisers for its benefit.

In March 2009, Norman curated Honor!, a celebration of the African-American cultural legacy. The festival honored African-American trailblazers and artists with concerts, recitals, lectures, panel discussions, and exhibitions hosted by Carnegie Hall, the Apollo Theater, the Cathedral of St. John the Divine, and other sites around New York City.

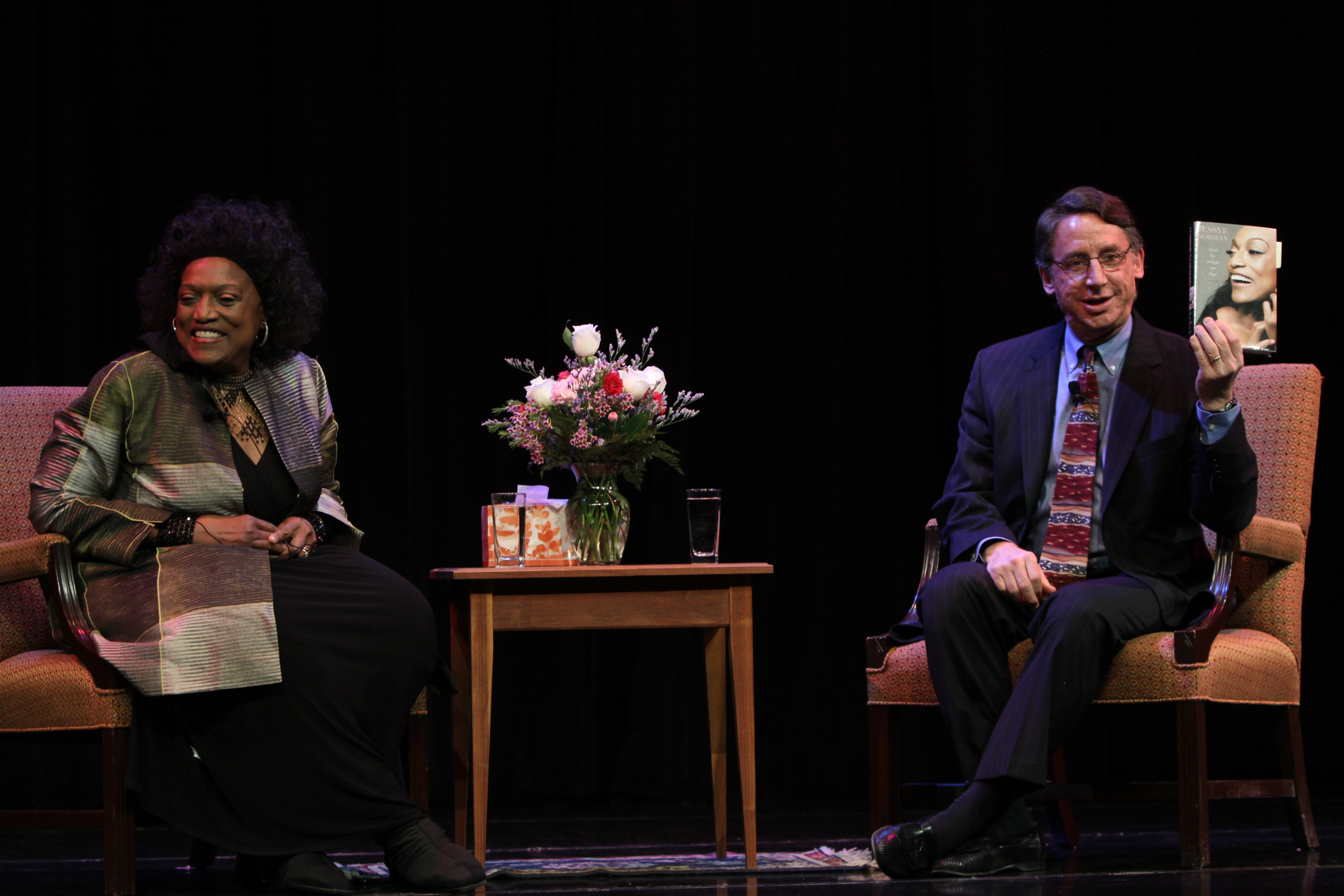
Norman with Tom Hall, 2014

Norman served on the boards of directors for Carnegie Hall, City-Meals-on-Wheels in New York City, the Dance Theatre of Harlem, the New York Botanical Garden, the New York Public Library, National Music Foundation, and the Elton John AIDS Foundation. She was a member of the board and spokesperson for the S.L.E. Lupus Foundation, and also spokesperson for Partnership for the Homeless. She served on the board of trustees of the Augusta Opera Association and of Paine College.

In March 2013, the Apollo Theater and Manhattan School of Music featured Norman in Ask Your Mama, a 90-minute multimedia show by Laura Karpman based on Langston Hughes's "Ask Your Mama: 12 Moods for Jazz".

In March 2014, Norman was featured at Green Music Center Weill Hall on the campus of Sonoma State University in Rohnert Park, California (Sonoma County), in a recital of American standards in tributes to the likes of George Gershwin, Duke Ellington and Ella Fitzgerald. In 2015, she and pianist Mark Markham presented a program of mainly Gershwin, Kern, and Rodgers and Hart at Carnegie Hall with a few art songs by Satie and Poulenc.

On May 6, 2014, Houghton Mifflin Harcourt published Norman's memoir, Stand Up Straight and Sing!

In April 2018, Norman was honored as the twelfth recipient of the Glenn Gould Prize for her contribution to opera and the arts.

=== Death and memorial ===
Norman suffered a spinal cord injury in 2015. She died at Mount Sinai Morningside in Manhattan on September 30, 2019, aged 74. The cause of death was given as "septic shock and multi-organ failure secondary to complications of" the spinal cord injury. In September 2021, it was reported that Norman's brother had pursued legal action for alleged medical negligence against the doctors and hospital involved in an operation on her in 2015.

Norman's public funeral was held in her hometown of Augusta, Georgia. Actor Laurence Fishburne, sociologist Michael Eric Dyson, Carnegie Hall's Clive Gillinson, civil rights activist Vernon Jordan, and Mayor Hardie Davis spoke. The mezzo soprano J'Nai Bridges; jazz musician Wycliffe Gordon; and students from Morehouse College, Spelman College, and the Jessye Norman School of the Arts performed.

Norman was memorialized with a gala tribute at the Metropolitan Opera House, New York City, on November 24, 2019. Among the speakers and performers at the public remembrance were Anna Deavere Smith; Gloria Steinem; the former Minister of Culture of France, Jack Lang; Eric Owens; The Dance Theatre of Harlem; the Alvin Ailey American Dance Theater; Peter Gelb; and Renée Fleming.

In an episode of the BBC Radio 4 programme Great Lives broadcast in September 2023, Norman was the choice of Chi-chi Nwanoku.

== Awards and nominations ==
=== Grammy Awards ===
The Grammy Awards are awarded annually by the National Academy of Recording Arts and Sciences. Norman has won 4 awards from 15 nominations as well as 1 lifetime achievement award.

Year	Award	Nominated work	Result
1981	Best Classical Vocal Soloist Performance	Berg: Der Wein - Concert Aria	Nominated
1983	Best Classical Vocal Soloist Performance	Berlioz: La Mort De Cleopatre	Nominated
1983	Best Opera Recording	Faure: Penelope	Nominated
1984	Best Classical Vocal Soloist Performance	The Brahms Edition: Lieder (Complete)	Nominated
1985	Best Classical Vocal Soloist Performance	Ravel: Songs Of Maurice Ravel	Won
1985	Best Classical Vocal Soloist Performance	Mahler: Symphony No. 2 In C Minor ("Resurrection")	Nominated
1988	Best Classical Vocal Soloist Performance	R. Strauss: Lieder (Including "Malven")	Nominated
1989	Best Classical Vocal Soloist Performance	Handel/Schubert/Schumann: Lieder (Jessye Norman - Live At Hohenems)	Nominated
1989	Best Classical Album	Wagner: Lohengrin	Nominated
1989	Best Opera Recording	Wagner: Lohengrin	Won
1990	Best Opera Recording	Wagner: Die Walkuere	Won
1990	Best Classical Album	Wagner: Die Walkuere	Nominated
1999	Best Classical Album	Bartók: Bluebeard's Castle	Nominated
1999	Best Opera Recording	Bartók: Bluebeard's Castle	Won
2006	Grammy Lifetime Achievement Award	Herself	Honored
2011	Best Classical Crossover Album	Roots - My Life, My Song	Nominated

=== Miscellaneous honors ===
Year	Award	Category	Nominated work	Result	Ref.
1966	National Society of Arts and Letters Singing Competition			Won	
1968	ARD International Music Competition in Munich			First place	
1973	Grand Prix du Disque		albums of lieder by Wagner, Schumann, Mahler and Schubert	Won	
1976	Grand Prix du Disque		albums of lieder by Wagner, Schumann, Mahler and Schubert	Won	
1977	Grand Prix du Disque		albums of lieder by Wagner, Schumann, Mahler and Schubert	Won	
1982	Gramophone Award		Four Last Songs	Won	
1982	Musical America magazine	Musician of the Year		Won	
1992	American Academy of Achievement	Golden Plate Award		Honored	
1993	Ace Award	Performance in a Music Special or Series	Jessye Norman at Notre Dame	Won	
1997	Radcliffe College	Radcliffe Medal		Honored	
1997	Kennedy Center Honors			Honored	
1999	Georgia Music Hall of Fame			Inducted	
2000	Eleanor Roosevelt Center	Eleanor Roosevelt Val-Kill Medal	Work in the fight against lupus, breast cancer, AIDS, and hunger	Honored	
2002	American Classical Music Hall of Fame			Honored	
2010	President Barack Obama	National Medal of Arts		Honored	
2013	NAACP	Spingarn Medal		Honored	
2015	Wolf Prize in Arts (with Murray Perahia)			Won	
2018	Glenn Gould Foundation	12th Glenn Gould Prize		Won	
2018	Royal Philharmonic Society Gold Medal			Won	

- 1984: Commandeur de l'ordre des Arts et des Lettres (France)
- 1984: France's National Museum of Natural History named an orchid for her.
- 1987: Member of the Royal Academy of Music
- 1989: Légion d'honneur (France)
- 1989: Honorary Fellow Jesus College, Cambridge
- 1990: Honorary Ambassador to the United Nations by UN Secretary-General Javier Pérez de Cuéllar
- 1991: Norman's home town, Augusta, Georgia, dedicated Riverwalk Augusta's amphitheater, named in her honor.
- 1995: Austrian Cross of Honour for Science and Art, 1st class
- 1996: Norman was a featured performer during the opening ceremonies of the 1996 Summer Olympics in Atlanta, Georgia.
- March 1997: Honored by New York's Associated Black Charities at the 11th Annual Black History Makers Awards Dinner for her contributions to the arts and to African-American culture
- 2000: Outstanding Alumnae by Howard University
- 2006: Edison Award (Oeuvreprijs)
- 2019: 8th Street in Augusta, Georgia is renamed Jessye Norman Boulevard
- 2021: The Interstate 20 and Washington Road interchange in Augusta, Georgia is renamed the Jessye Norman Memorial Interchange

=== Honorary doctorates ===
Norman received honorary doctorates from more than 30 colleges, universities, and conservatories.

Year	College	Notes	Ref.
1982	Howard University	Honorary doctorate	
1984	Boston Conservatory of Music	Honorary doctorate	
1984	Sewanee: The University of the South	Honorary doctorate	
1988	Harvard University	Honorary doctorate	
1989	University of Cambridge, UK	Honorary doctorate	
1990	Juilliard School of Music	Honorary doctorate of Music	
1990	Yale University	Honorary doctorate	
1996	Wesleyan University	Honorary doctorate of Fine Arts	
2011	Manhattan School of Music	Honorary doctorate	
2011	Northwestern University	Honorary doctorate	
2013	University of Rochester	Honorary doctorate	
2015	University of Oxford, UK	Honorary doctorate	
2019	New England Conservatory of Music, Boston	Honorary doctorate	

== Repertoire ==
=== Opera roles ===
Among Norman's opera roles were:

- Aida, Aida (Verdi)
- Alceste, Alceste (Gluck)
- Antonia, The Tales of Hoffmann (Offenbach)
- Ariadne, Ariadne auf Naxos (Richard Strauss)
- Armida, Armida (Haydn)
- Arminda, Die Gärtnerin aus Liebe (Mozart)
- Carmen, Carmen (Bizet)
- Cassandre and Didon, Les Troyens (Berlioz)
- Countess Almaviva, Le nozze di Figaro (Mozart)
- Deborah, Deborah (Handel)
- Dido, Dido and Aeneas (Purcell)
- Donna Elvira, Don Giovanni (Mozart)
- Elisabeth, Tannhäuser (Wagner)
- Elle, La voix humaine (Poulenc)
- Elsa, Lohengrin (Wagner)
- Emilia Marty, The Makropulos Affair (Janáček)
- Euryanthe, Euryanthe (Weber)
- Giulietta, The Tales of Hoffmann (Offenbach)
- Hélène, La belle Hélène (Offenbach)
- Idamante, Idomeneo (Mozart)
- Isolde, Tristan und Isolde (Wagner) (Act II in Concert)
- Jocasta, Oedipus rex (Stravinsky)
- Judith, Bluebeard's Castle (Bartók)
- Kundry, Parsifal (Wagner)
- Giulietta di Kelbar, Un giorno di regno (Verdi)
- Leonore, Fidelio (Beethoven)
- Madame Lidoine, Dialogues of the Carmelites (Poulenc)
- Marguerite, La damnation de Faust (Berlioz)
- Medora, Il corsaro (Verdi)
- Pénélope, Pénélope (Fauré)
- Phèdre, Hippolyte et Aricie (Rameau)
- Rosina, La vera costanza (Haydn)
- Salome, Salome (R. Strauss)
- Salome, Hérodiade (Massenet)
- Santuzza, Cavalleria rusticana (Mascagni)
- Sélika, L'Africaine (Meyerbeer)
- Sieglinde, Die Walküre (Wagner)
- Third Norn, Götterdämmerung (Wagner)
- Woman, Erwartung (Schoenberg)

=== Oratorios ===
Notable parts in oratorios and orchestral concerts included:

- (Berlioz) Les nuits d'été
- (Berlioz) Roméo et Juliette
- (Brahms) Alto Rhapsody
- (Mahler) Das Lied von der Erde
- (Mahler) Des Knaben Wunderhorn
- (Mahler) Lieder eines fahrenden Gesellen
- (Mahler) Kindertotenlieder
- (Mahler) Symphony No. 2 "Resurrection"
- (Mahler) Symphony No. 3
- (Ravel) Shéhérazade
- (Schoenberg) Gurre-Lieder
- (R. Strauss) Four Last Songs
- (Tippett), A Child of Our Time

=== Recitals ===
Norman performed recitals, including:

- Alban Berg: Sieben frühe Lieder, Altenberg Lieder, Jugendlieder
- Brahms: Lieder
- Chausson: Poème de l'amour et de la mer, Chanson perpétuelle
- Poulenc: Mélodies
- Ravel: Chansons madécasses
- Satie: Mélodies
- Schoenberg: Brettl-Lieder
- Schubert: Lieder, Erlkönig
- Schumann: Frauen-Liebe und Leben, Liederkreis, Op. 39
- R. Strauss: Lieder
- Wagner:Wesendonck Lieder
- Hugo Wolf: Lieder
