= Oscar Peterson =

Canadian jazz pianist (1925–2007)

Oscar Peterson CC CQ OOnt
- Peterson in 1977

Background information
- Born: Oscar Emmanuel Peterson; August 15, 1925; Montreal, Quebec, Canada
- Died: December 23, 2007 (aged 82) Mississauga, Ontario, Canada
- Genres: Jazz; classical
- Occupations: Musician; composer
- Instruments: Piano; synthesizer
- Years active: 1945–2007
- Labels: RCA Victor; Mercury; MPS; Pablo; Telarc; Verve; BASF
- Website: oscarpeterson.com

Oscar Emmanuel Peterson (August 15, 1925 – December 23, 2007) was a Canadian jazz pianist and composer. As a virtuoso who is considered to be one of the greatest jazz pianists of all time, Peterson released more than 200 recordings, won eight Grammy Awards, as well as a lifetime achievement award from the Recording Academy, and received numerous other awards and honours. He played thousands of concerts worldwide in a career lasting more than 60 years. He was called the "Maharaja of the keyboard" by Duke Ellington, simply "O.P." by his friends, and was informally known in the jazz community as "the King of inside swing".

He considered his 1953–1958 trio with Ray Brown and Herb Ellis "the most stimulating" and productive setting for public performances and studio recordings. He also worked solo, as an accompanist, and in duos and trios with Sam Jones, Niels-Henning Ørsted Pedersen, Joe Pass, Irving Ashby, Count Basie, and Herbie Hancock.

Peterson won eight Grammy Awards between 1975 and 1997. He is considered among the best jazz pianists and jazz improvisers of the twentieth century.

== Early life and education ==
Peterson was born on August 15, 1925, in the Saint-Henri of Montreal in Quebec, Canada, to immigrants from the West Indies (Saint Kitts and Nevis and the British Virgin Islands); his mother, Kathleen, was a domestic worker, and his father, Daniel, worked as a porter for Canadian Pacific Railway and was an amateur musician who taught himself to play the organ, trumpet and piano. Peterson grew up in the neighbourhood of Little Burgundy in Montreal. It was in this predominantly black neighbourhood that he encountered the jazz culture. At the age of five, Peterson began honing his skills on trumpet and piano, but a bout of tuberculosis when he was seven years old prevented him from playing the trumpet again, so he directed all his attention to the piano. His father was one of his first music teachers, and his sister Daisy taught him classical piano. Peterson was persistent at practising scales and classical études.

As a child, Peterson studied with Hungarian-born pianist Paul de Marky, a student of István Thomán, who had himself been a pupil of Franz Liszt, so his early training was predominantly based on classical piano. However, Peterson was captivated by traditional jazz and boogie-woogie and learned several ragtime pieces. He was called "the Brown Bomber of the Boogie-Woogie".

At the age of nine, Peterson played piano with a degree of control that impressed professional musicians. For many years his piano studies included four to six hours of daily practice. Only in his later years did he decrease his practice to one or two hours daily. In 1940, at fourteen years of age, he won the national music competition organized by the Canadian Broadcasting Corporation. After that victory, he dropped out of the High School of Montreal, where he played in a band with Maynard Ferguson. Peterson became a professional pianist, starring in a weekly radio show and playing at hotels and music halls. In his teens, he was a member of the Johnny Holmes Orchestra. From 1945 to 1949, he worked in a trio and recorded for Victor Records. He gravitated toward boogie-woogie and swing with a particular fondness for Nat King Cole and Teddy Wilson. By the time Peterson was in his 20s, he had developed a reputation as a technically brilliant and melodically inventive pianist.

== Career ==
=== Duos, trios, and quartets ===
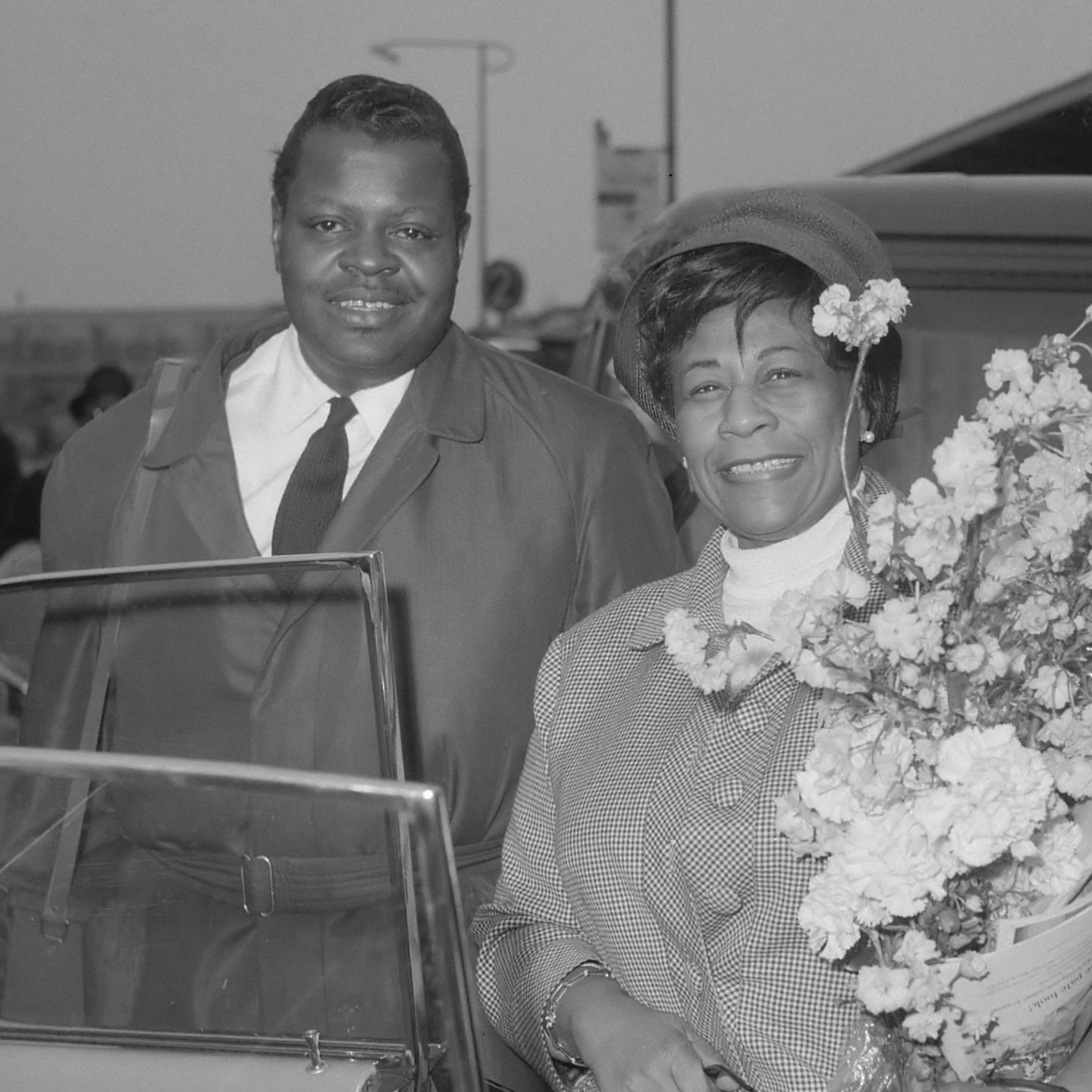
Peterson with Ella Fitzgerald in 1964

According to an interview with Norman Granz, Granz heard a radio program broadcasting from a local club while taking a cab to the Montreal airport. He was so impressed that he told the driver to take him to the club so he could meet the pianist. Granz had seen Peterson before this but was underwhelmed. In 1949, he introduced Peterson in New York City at a Jazz at the Philharmonic concert at Carnegie Hall. He remained Peterson's manager for most of his career. This was more than a managerial relationship; Peterson praised Granz for standing up for him and other black jazz musicians in the segregationist south US of the 1950s and 1960s. In the documentary video Music in the Key of Oscar, Peterson tells how Granz stood up to a gun-toting Southern policeman who wanted to stop the trio from using whites-only taxis.

In 1950, Peterson worked in a duo with double bassist Ray Brown. In the early 1950s, he began performing with Brown and drummer Charlie Smith as the Oscar Peterson Trio. Shortly afterward Smith was replaced by swing guitarist Irving Ashby, who had been a member of the Nat King Cole Trio. Ashby was soon replaced by Barney Kessel, then Herb Ellis stepped in in 1953 after Kessel grew weary of touring. The trio remained together from 1953 to 1958, often touring with Jazz at the Philharmonic.

By 1956, Peterson's performances were also showcased on national radio networks by Ben Selvin within the RCA Thesaurus transcriptions library.

"The Way You Look Tonight" (1965)
An excerpt of Peterson playing Jerome Kern and Dorothy Fields's 1936 composition "The Way You Look Tonight" in 1965

He considered the trio with Brown and Ellis "the most stimulating" and productive setting for public performances and studio recordings.

Their last recording, On the Town with the Oscar Peterson Trio, recorded live at the Town Tavern in Toronto, captured a remarkable degree of emotional as well as musical understanding among three players.

When Ellis departed in 1958, they hired drummer Ed Thigpen because they felt no guitarist could compare to Ellis. Brown and Thigpen worked with Peterson on his albums Night Train (1963) and Canadiana Suite (1965). Both Brown and Thigpen left in 1965 and were replaced by bassist Sam Jones and drummer Louis Hayes (and later, drummer Bobby Durham). The trio performed together until 1970. In 1969, Peterson recorded Motions and Emotions with orchestral arrangements of "Yesterday" and "Eleanor Rigby" by The Beatles. In the fall of 1970, Peterson's trio released the album Tristeza on Piano. Jones and Durham left in 1970.

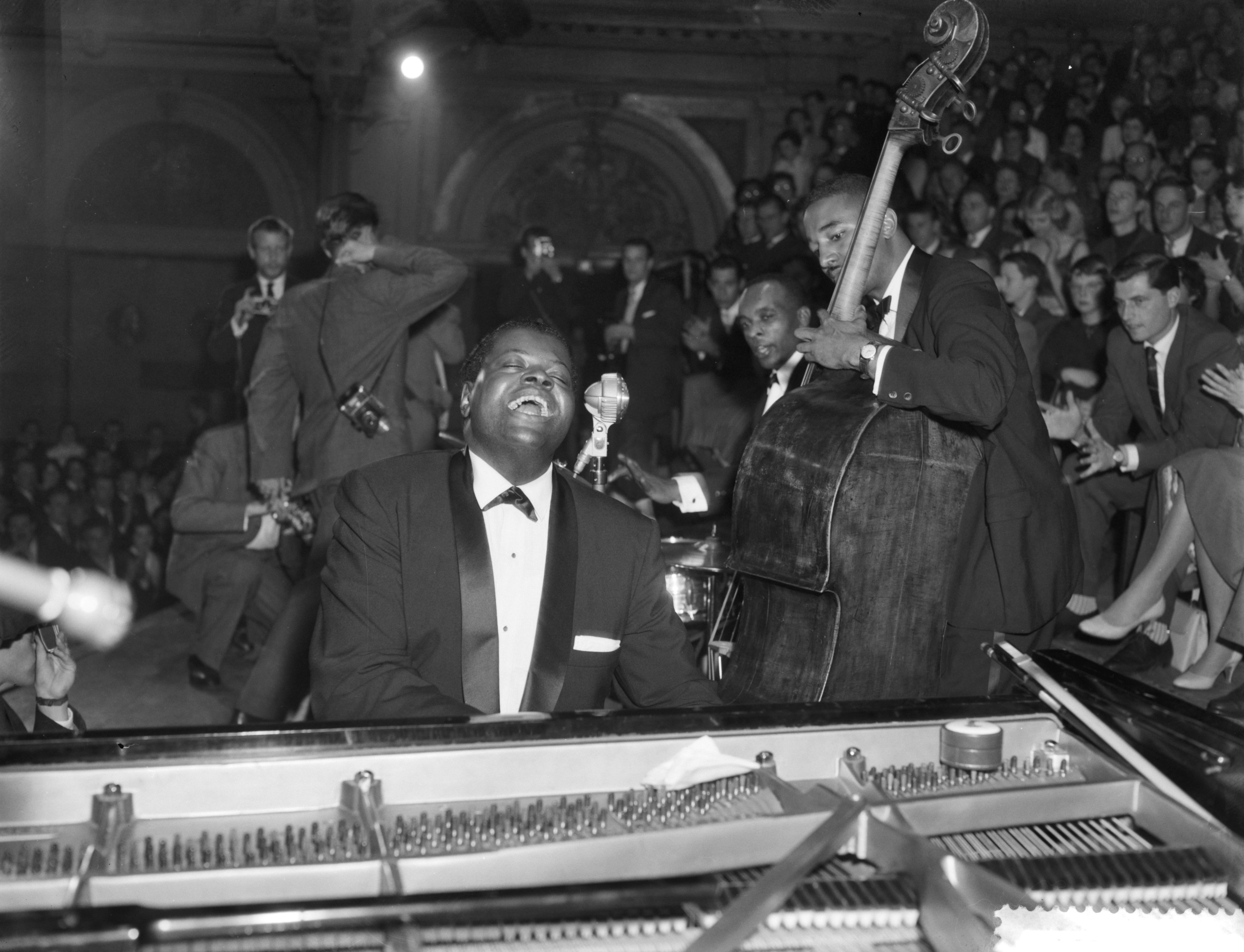
The Oscar Peterson Trio in 1959

In the 1970s. Peterson formed a trio with guitarist Joe Pass and bassist Niels-Henning Ørsted Pedersen. This trio emulated the success of the 1950s trio with Brown and Ellis and gave acclaimed performances at festivals. Their album The Trio won the 1974 Grammy Award for Best Jazz Performance by a Group. On April 22, 1978, Peterson performed in the interval act for the Eurovision Song Contest 1978 that was broadcast live from the Palais des congrès de Paris. In 1974, he added British drummer Martin Drew. This quartet toured and recorded extensively worldwide. Pass said in a 1976 interview: "The only guys I've heard who come close to total mastery of their instruments are Art Tatum and Peterson." He recorded for Pablo, led by Norman Granz, after the label was founded in 1973, where he collaborated with artists including Ella Fitzgerald, Count Basie, Roy Eldridge, Dizzy Gillespie and Stéphane Grappelli. For Pablo he also recorded the soundtrack for the 1978 thriller The Silent Partner.

Peterson was open to experimental collaborations with jazz musicians such as saxophonist Ben Webster, trumpeter Clark Terry, and vibraphonist Milt Jackson. In 1961, the Peterson trio with Jackson recorded the album Very Tall. Solo recordings by Peterson were rare until Exclusively for My Friends (MPS), a series of albums that were his response to pianists such as Bill Evans and McCoy Tyner. In the 1980s, Peterson played in a duo with pianist Herbie Hancock. In the late 1980s and 1990s, after a stroke, Peterson made performances and recordings with his protégé Benny Green. In the 1990s and 2000s, Peterson recorded several albums accompanied by a combo for Telarc.

=== Ill health and later years ===
Peterson had arthritis from his youth, and in later years he had trouble buttoning his shirt. He had never been slender, and his weight increase to 125 kg (276 lb) hindered his mobility. He had hip replacement surgery in the early 1990s. Although the surgery was successful, his mobility was still hampered. He then mentored the York University jazz program and was the Chancellor of the university for several years in the early 1990s. He published jazz piano etudes for practice. Peterson had a short, uncredited, non-speaking cameo role in the 1990 film Ghost, where he appeared as a patron of Oda Mae Brown played by Whoopi Goldberg. This cameo coincided with a personal visit to New York City during the filming at 720 Franklin Avenue, Brooklyn, New York.

In 1993, a stroke weakened his left side and removed him from work for two years. During the same year, incoming prime minister Jean Chrétien, Peterson's friend and fan, offered him the position of Lieutenant-Governor of Ontario. According to Chrétien, Peterson declined the job due to ill health related to the stroke.

Although he recovered some dexterity in his left hand, his piano playing was diminished, and his style relied principally on his right hand. In 1995, he returned to occasional public performances and recorded for Telarc. In 1997, he received the Grammy Lifetime Achievement Award and an International Jazz Hall of Fame Award. His friend, Canadian politician and amateur pianist Bob Rae, said: "a one-handed Oscar was better than just about anyone with two hands."

In 2003, Peterson recorded the DVD A Night in Vienna for Verve with Niels-Henning Ørsted Pedersen, Ulf Wakenius, and Martin Drew. He continued to tour the U.S. and Europe, though at most one month a year, with rest between concerts. In 2007, his health declined. He cancelled his plans to perform at the Toronto Jazz Festival and a Carnegie Hall all-star concert that was to be given in his honour. Peterson died on December 23, 2007, of kidney failure at his home in Mississauga, Ontario.

== Personal life ==
Peterson was married four times and had seven children with three of his wives. He smoked cigarettes and a pipe and often tried to break the habit but gained weight every time he stopped. He loved to cook and remained overweight throughout his life.

He enjoyed fly fishing and photography and had a cottage on Big Straggle Lake, in Harcourt, Haliburton Highlands, Ontario, known as the Peterson Family Cottage.

Peterson taught piano and improvisation in Canada, mainly in Toronto. With associates, he started and headed the Advanced School of Contemporary Music in Toronto for five years during the 1960s, but it closed because touring called him and his associates away, and it did not have government funding.

== Musical style and influences ==
Peterson was influenced by Teddy Wilson, Nat King Cole, James P. Johnson, and Art Tatum, to whom many compared Peterson in later years. After his father played a record of Tatum's "Tiger Rag", he was intimidated and disillusioned, quitting the piano for several weeks. "Tatum scared me to death," said Peterson, adding that he was "never cocky again" about his ability at the piano. Tatum was a model for Peterson's musicianship during the 1940s and 1950s. Tatum and Peterson became good friends, although Peterson was always shy about being compared to Tatum and rarely played the piano in Tatum's presence.

Peterson also credited his sister—a piano teacher in Montreal who also taught several other Canadian jazz musicians—with being an important teacher and influence on his career. Under his sister's tutelage, Peterson expanded into classical piano training and broadened his range while mastering the core classical pianism from scales to preludes and fugues by Johann Sebastian Bach. He asked his students to study the music of Johann Sebastian Bach, especially The Well-Tempered Clavier, the Goldberg Variations, and The Art of Fugue, considering these piano pieces essential for every serious pianist. Among his students were pianists Benny Green and Oliver Jones.

Building on Tatum's pianism and aesthetics, Peterson also absorbed Tatum's musical influences, notably from piano concertos by Sergei Rachmaninoff. Rachmaninoff's harmonizations, as well as direct quotations from his 2nd Piano Concerto, are scattered throughout many recordings by Peterson, including his work with the most familiar formulation of the Oscar Peterson Trio, with bassist Ray Brown and guitarist Herb Ellis. During the 1960s and 1970s Peterson made numerous trio recordings highlighting his piano performances; they reveal more of his eclectic style, absorbing influences from various genres of jazz, popular, and classical music.

According to pianist and educator Mark Eisenman, some of Peterson's best playing was as an understated accompanist to singer Ella Fitzgerald and trumpeter Roy Eldridge.

== Legacy ==
Peterson is considered one of history's great jazz pianists. He was called the "Maharaja of the keyboard" by Duke Ellington, simply "O.P." by his friends, and was informally known in the jazz community as "the King of inside swing".

Peterson was honoured on two postage stamps: one from Austrian Post in 2003, and another from Canada Post in 2005.

In 2021, Barry Avrich produced a documentary on Peterson's life titled Oscar Peterson: Black + White that had its world premiere at the Toronto International Film Festival. In the same year, he was the subject of a Heritage Minute for Canadian television, with contemporary jazz pianist Thompson Egbo-Egbo playing the young Peterson.

Oscar Peterson was featured on a circulating commemorative one dollar coin (a "loonie") from the Canadian mint in 2022.

== Awards and honours ==
=== Grammy Awards ===
- 1975: Best Jazz Performance by a Group The Trio
- 1977: Best Jazz Performance by a Soloist The Giants
- 1978: Best Jazz Instrumental Performance, Soloist Oscar Peterson Jam – Montreux '77
- 1979: Best Jazz Instrumental Performance, Soloist Oscar Peterson and The Trumpet Kings – Jousts
- 1990: Best Jazz Instrumental Performance, Group Live at the Blue Note
- 1990: Best Jazz Instrumental Performance, Soloist The Legendary Oscar Peterson Trio Live at the Blue Note
- 1991: Best Jazz Instrumental Performance, Group Saturday Night at the Blue Note
- 1997: Lifetime Achievement Award Instrumental Soloist Lifetime Achievement

=== Other awards ===
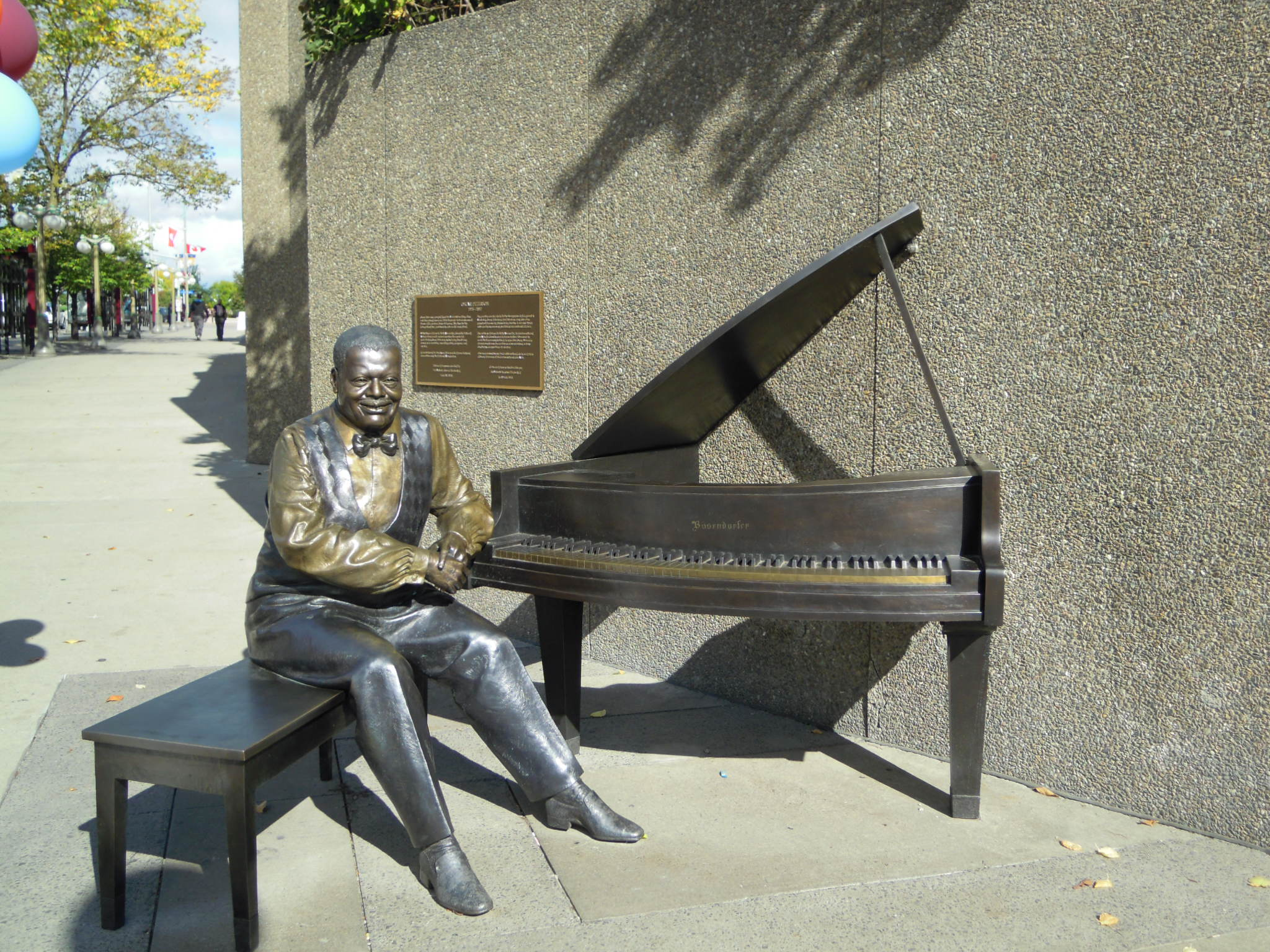
A statue of Oscar Peterson was unveiled by Queen Elizabeth II at the National Arts Centre in Ottawa in June 2010.

- Pianist of the year, DownBeat magazine, 1950, and won again for the next 12 years
- Order of Canada, Officer, 1972; Companion, 1984
- Canadian Version of the Queen Elizabeth II Silver Jubilee Medal, 1977
- Canadian Music Hall of Fame, 1978
- Martin Luther King Jr. Achievement Award, Black Theatre Workshop, 1986
- Roy Thomson Award, 1987
- Toronto Arts Award for lifetime achievement, 1991
- Governor General's Performing Arts Award, 1992
- Order of Ontario, member 1992
- 125th Anniversary of the Confederation of Canada Medal, 1992
- Glenn Gould Prize, 1993
- International Society for Performing Artists award, 1995
- Loyola Medal of Concordia University, 1997
- Praemium Imperiale World Art Award, 1999
- Oscar Peterson Concert Hall named at Concordia University, 1999
- UNESCO Music Prize, 2000
- Toronto Musicians' Association Musician of the Year, 2001
- Canadian Version of the Queen Elizabeth II Golden Jubilee Medal, 2002
- SOCAN Special Achievement Award, 2008
- Canada's Walk of Fame, 2013
- Canadian Jazz and Blues Hall of Fame
- Juno Award Hall of Fame
- BBC Radio Lifetime Achievement Award
- National Order of Quebec, Chevalier
- Ordre des Arts et des Lettres, France
- Civic Award of Merit, City of Mississauga, 2003
- Oscar Peterson Theatre, Canadian Embassy, Tokyo, Japan, 2007
- Oscar Peterson Hall, University of Toronto Mississauga, 2008
- Oscar Peterson Public School, Stouffville, 2009
- Parc Oscar-Peterson, Little Burgundy, Montreal, renamed in Peterson's honour 2009
- Statue of Oscar Peterson unveiled in Ottawa by Queen Elizabeth II, 2010
- Jazz Born Here, mural by Gene Pendon depicting Oscar Peterson, at Rue Saint-Jacques and Rue des Seigneurs in Montreal
- Historica Canada Heritage Minute, 2021
- Honorary degrees from Berklee College of Music, Carleton University, Queen's University, Concordia University, Université Laval, McMaster University, Mount Allison University, Niagara University, Northwestern University, University of Toronto, University of the West Indies, University of Western Ontario, University of Victoria, and York University
- (Announced) Public square to be named in honour of Oscar Peterson, Montreal, 2021

== Instruments ==
- Bösendorfer pianos – 1980s and 2000s, some performances from the 1970s onward.
- Yamaha – Acoustic and Disklavier; used from 1998 to 2006 in Canada (Touring and Recording)
- Steinway & Sons Model A (which currently resides at Village Studios in Los Angeles) – most performances from the 1940s through the 1980s, some recordings.
- Baldwin pianos – some performances in the US, some recordings.
- C. Bechstein Pianofortefabrik pianos – some performances and recordings in Europe.
- Petrof pianos – some performances in Europe.
- Clavichord – on album Porgy and Bess with Joe Pass
- Fender Rhodes electric piano – several recordings.
- Synthesizer – several recordings.
- Hammond organ – some live performances and several recordings.
- Vocals – some live performances and several recordings.

== See also ==
- Music of Canada
- List of jazz pianists

Academic offices
Preceded by Larry Clarke	Chancellor of York University; 1991–1994	Succeeded by Arden Haynes
