= Statue of Oscar Peterson =

Statue in Ottawa, Ontario, Canada

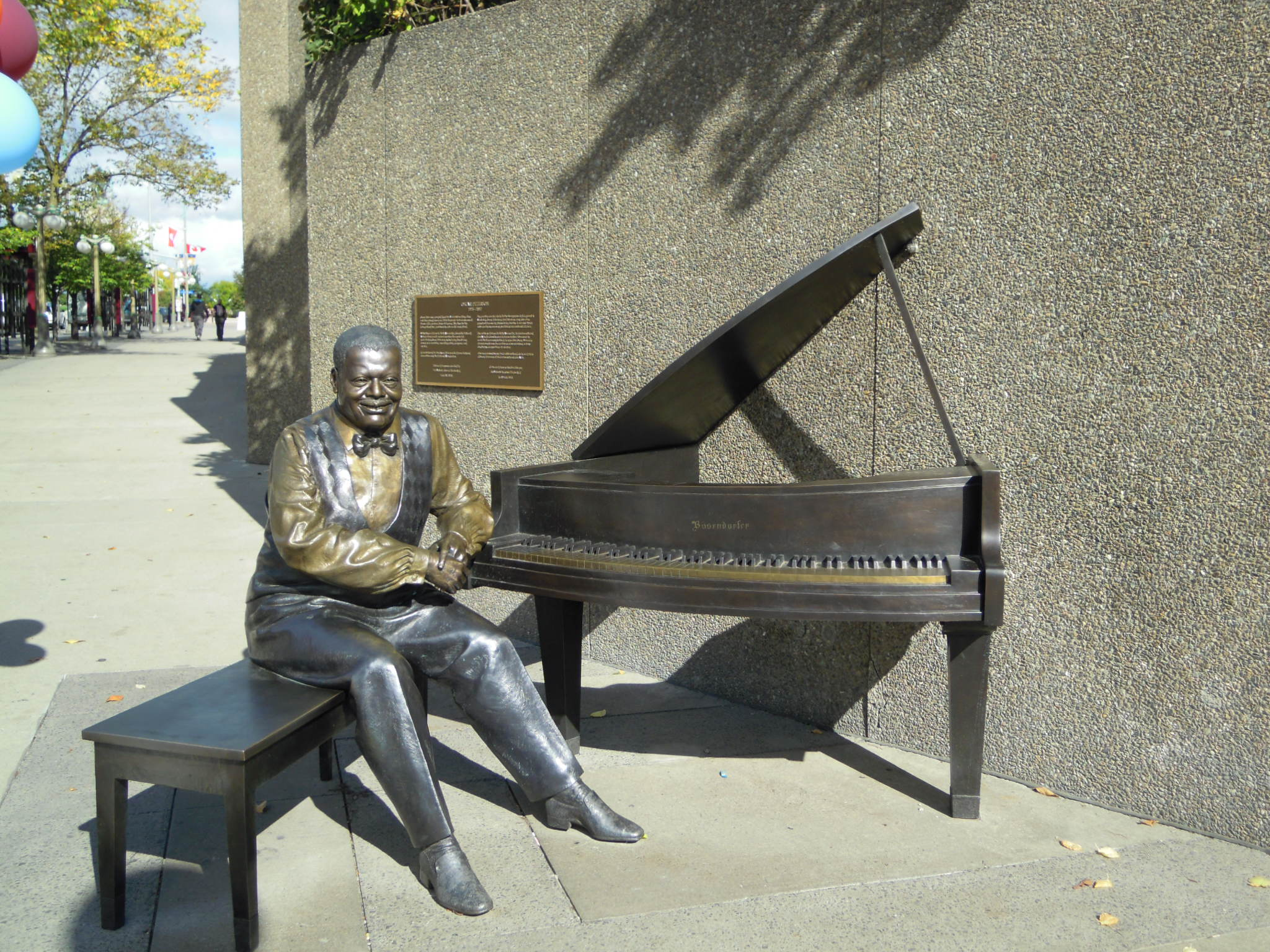
- The statue in September 2010
- Year: 2010
- Medium: Bronze sculpture
- Subject: Oscar Peterson
- Location: Ottawa, Ontario, Canada
- 45°25′21.6″N 75°41′38.2″W

A statue of the Canadian jazz pianist Oscar Peterson is located at the corner of Elgin and Albert streets in Ottawa, Ontario, Canada, outside Canada's National Arts Centre.

== Description ==
The life size statue depicts Peterson sitting on a bench at a piano, smiling, and includes a space for visitors to sit next to him. The statue was intended to depict Peterson as if he had just finished playing and had turned toward his audience. The statue is made from bronze, and was created by the Canadian sculptor Ruth Abernethy. Abernathy said the statue was designed so that Peterson was "...very accessible to people who love him and that is an unabashed set-up to just have a moment with Oscar". The piano has 97 keys as opposed to the 88 keys on a standard piano, and is based on an Austrian piano that Peterson favoured. Abernethy intended the extra keys to represent a "metaphor for his musical inventiveness" as Peterson was a "...man who asked to reimagine the piano". Abernathy had previously created a sculpture the Canadian classical pianist, Glenn Gould, situated outside the Canadian Broadcasting Centre in Toronto. The statue cost $300,000 and was funded by private donations. Major donors included Allan Slaight's charitable foundation, Fred and Anne Ketchen of Mississauga, the Toronto-Dominion Bank and the Mayor of Mississauga's Foundation for Arts, Culture and Heritage.

== Unveiling ==
It was unveiled on 30 June 2010 by Elizabeth II, Queen of Canada. Peterson had performed for Elizabeth in Toronto, during celebrations of her Golden Jubilee in 2002. The Queen met Peterson's wife, Kelly Peterson, and his daughter, Celine, at the unveiling ceremony and the Montreal Jubilation Choir performed his composition "Hymn to Freedom". Kelly Peterson said that her reaction to the statue was, "like walking in and seeing him. It's amazing how it works like that", and that it was, "an overwhelming honour for Oscar. I'm so proud and pleased about that".

== Recent history ==
The statue was vandalized in August 2014 by two people who painted tears with gold paint onto Peterson's eyes. An outdoor concert was held by the statue in August 2015 to celebrate Peterson's 90th birthday.
