= Jean-Guihen Queyras =

French cellist

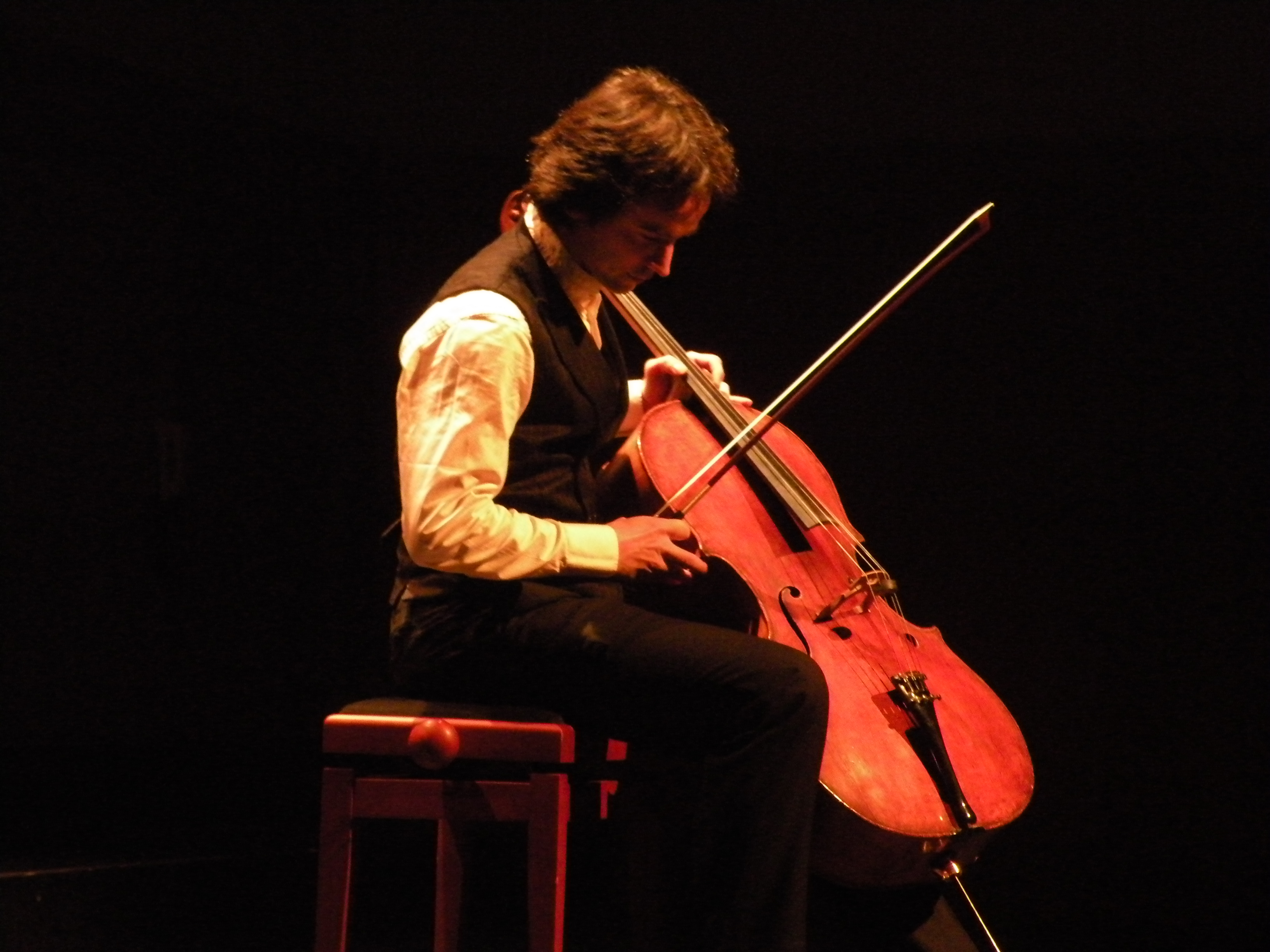
Jean-Guhien Queyras during la Folle Journée 2009

Jean-Guihen Queyras (born 11 March 1967) is a French cellist. He was born in Montreal, Quebec, Canada, and moved with his parents to Algeria when he was five years old; the family moved to France three years later. He has been a professor at the Musikhochschule Freiburg (where he commenced studies in 1984) since 2011 and artistic co-director of the Rencontres Musicales de Haute-Provence. He won the Glenn Gould Protégé Prize in Toronto in 2002. He was a soloist with the Ensemble intercontemporain.

Queyras records for Harmonia Mundi, including: the cello concertos of Dvorak, Elgar, Ligeti, and others; the complete cello suites of both Johann Sebastian Bach and Benjamin Britten; Beethoven's complete works for cello and piano (with Alexander Melnikov); and many piano trios with Isabelle Faust and Melnikov. He is noted for his exceptionally wide range of repertoire: he has recorded cello concertos by Haydn, Monn, and Vivaldi on a period instrument with the Freiburger Barockorchester and the Akademie für Alte Musik Berlin, but also champions the music of Dallapiccola, Kurtag, Ligeti, Webern, and others.

He gave the world premieres of Ivan Fedele's cello concerto (Orchestre National de France, Leonard Slatkin) and Gilbert Amy's concerto (Tokyo Symphony Orchestra at Suntory Hall in Tokyo); in September 2005, he premiered Bruno Mantovani's concerto with the Saarbrücken Radio Sinfonie Orchestra and Philippe Schoeller's Wind's Eyes with the SWR Sinfonieorchester Baden-Baden and Freiburg. He also gave the world premieres of Thomas Larcher's Ouroboros in 2016 and Tristan Murail's De Pays et d'Hommes Étranges (Of Strange Lands and Strange Men) in 2019.

His recordings have won distinctions such as Top CD – BBC Music Magazine, Diapason d'Or (for the complete Bach cello suites), CHOC du Monde de la Musique, 10 de Classica/Répertoire, and Editor's Choice from Gramophone.

Queyras is part of the Arcanto Quartet with Antje Weithaas, Daniel Sepec and Tabea Zimmermann. He plays a cello made in 1696 by Gioffredo Cappa which has been lent to him since 2006 by the Société Générale. He uses two bows: a heavier one by Thomas Gerbeth in Vienna, for 20th- and 21st-century repertoire, and a lighter Tourte.
