= Ruth Abernethy =

Canadian sculptor

Ruth Abernethy CM
- Born: 1960 (age 65–66); Lindsay, Ontario, Canada
- Education: Vancouver Island University
- Known for: sculptor
- Website: www.ruthabernethy.com

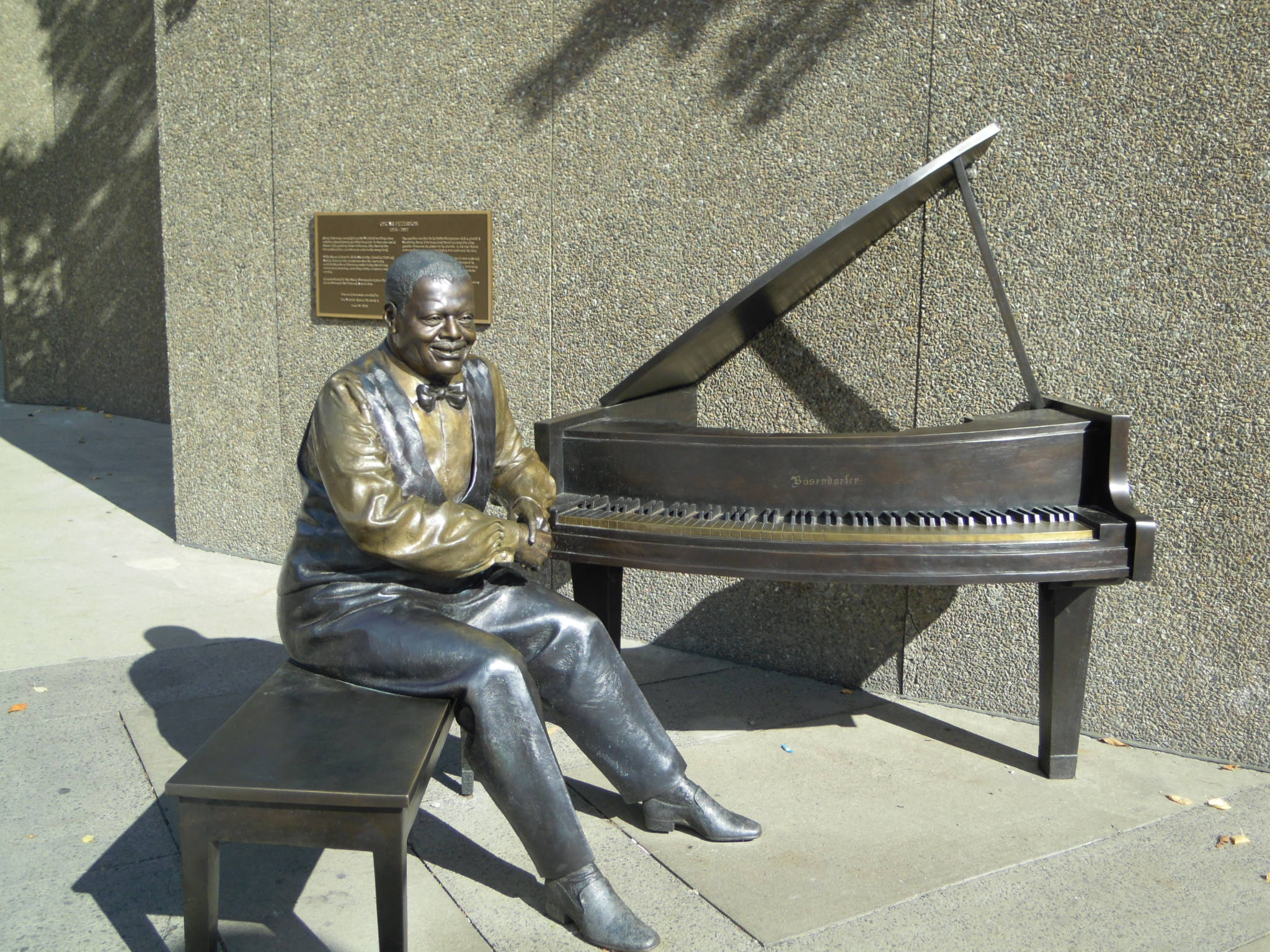
A statue by Abernethy

Ruth Elsie Abernethy (born 1960) is a Canadian sculptor born in Lindsay, Ontario. Her work includes bronze figure portraits of Glenn Gould at CBC, Toronto, and Oscar Peterson at the National Arts Centre, Ottawa. She wrote Life and Bronze: A Sculptor's Journal in 2016.

== Career ==
Abernethy was hired for professional theatre at age 17, she subsequently studied at Vancouver Island University (University) in Nanaimo, British Columbia. At age 21, Abernethy was Head of Props at the Royal Manitoba Theatre Centre and joined the Stratford Festival where she received a Guthrie Award in 1981. Abernethy has worked with most of Canada's regional theatres, the Louisville Ballet and the National Ballet of Canada. She received Canada Council support for pursuing arts explorations in Japan and Europe in 1985.

Abernethy created the statue of jazz pianist Oscar Peterson which was unveiled by Queen Elizabeth II and is situated in front of the National Arts Centre in Ottawa, Ontario.

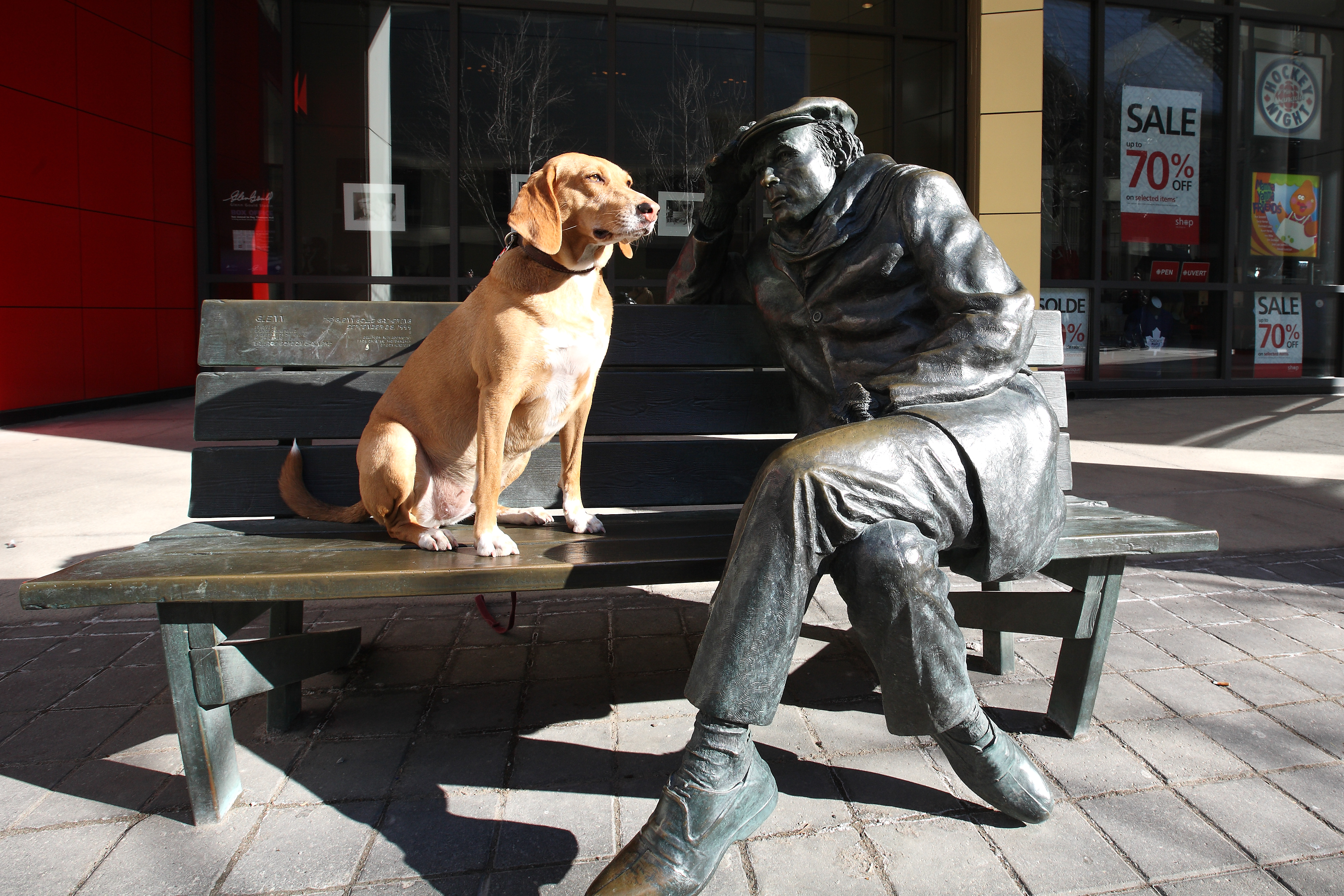
Statue outside the Canadian Broadcasting Centre in Toronto

Another notable statue is of the classical pianist Glenn Gould. It was installed outside the Canadian Broadcasting Centre at CBC Headquarters, Toronto. The statue was inspired by a photograph by Columbia Records photographer Don Hunstein.

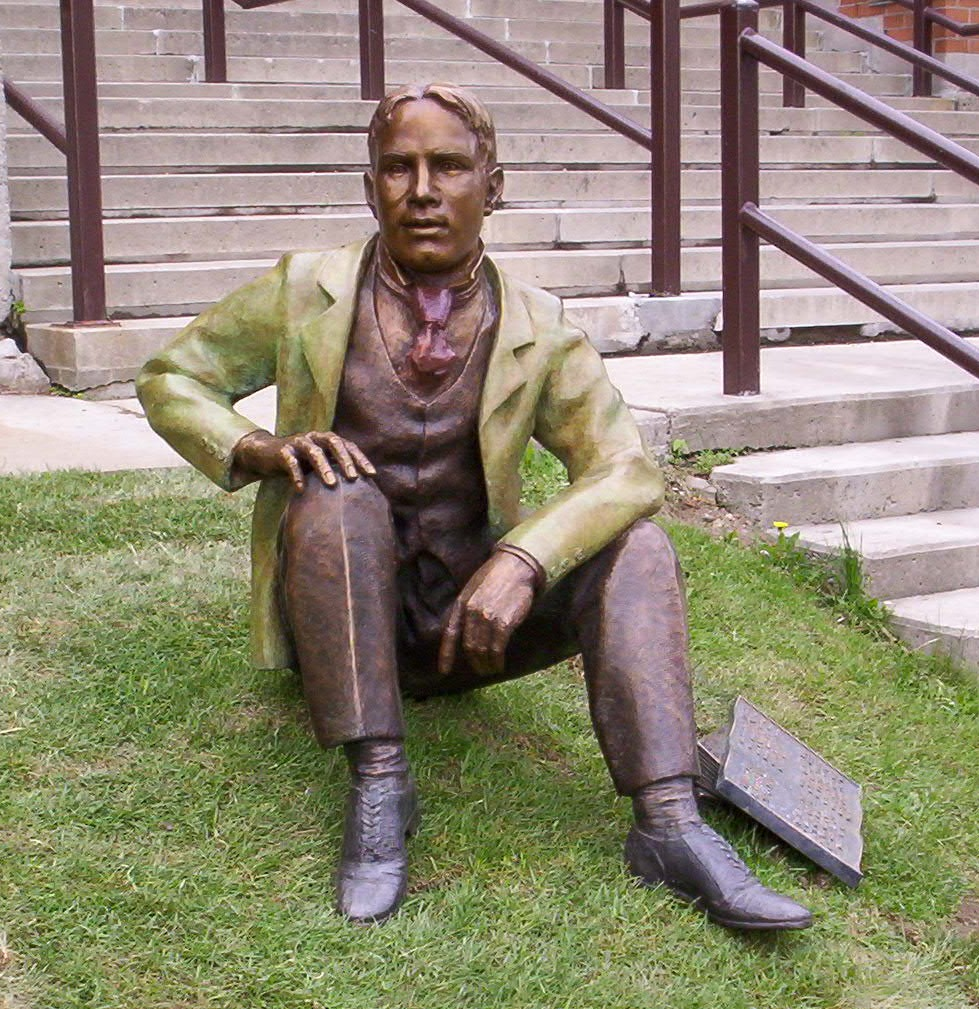
Prime minister William Lyon Mackenzie King

Abernethy created two different portraits of John A. Macdonald, Canada's first prime minister, in Picton, Ontario (Holding Court, 2015) and Baden, Ontario (A Canadian Conversation, 2016). Abernethy's portrait of John A. Macdonald was the first figure of The Prime Ministers Path installed on the grounds of Castle Kilbride, Baden, Ontario. It had previously been installed at Wilfrid Laurier University, but was removed and relocated after concerns were raised about Macdonald's role in creating the Canadian Indian residential school system. Controversy regarding the statue was raised again in June 2020, following the dousing of Macdonald's statue in red paint, an act that coincided with the celebration of National Indigenous Peoples Day.

Abernethy's portrait of stem cell discoverers Drs. James Till and Ernest McCulloch was installed at Science World Vancouver in 2016. A duplicate portrait unveiled at the MaRS Discovery District, Toronto on September 28, 2017.

She developed a method of figurative mapping to create 3D portraits.

Abernethy was the first Canadian exhibitor with Sculpture-by-the-Sea, Sydney, in 2004 and Sculpture in Context, in Dublin. In 2016, Abernethy sculpted Abraham Lincoln for Pittsfield, Illinois.

In 2024, she was appointed as a member of the Order of Canada. She lives in Wellesley, Ontario.
