= Peggy Lee albums discography =

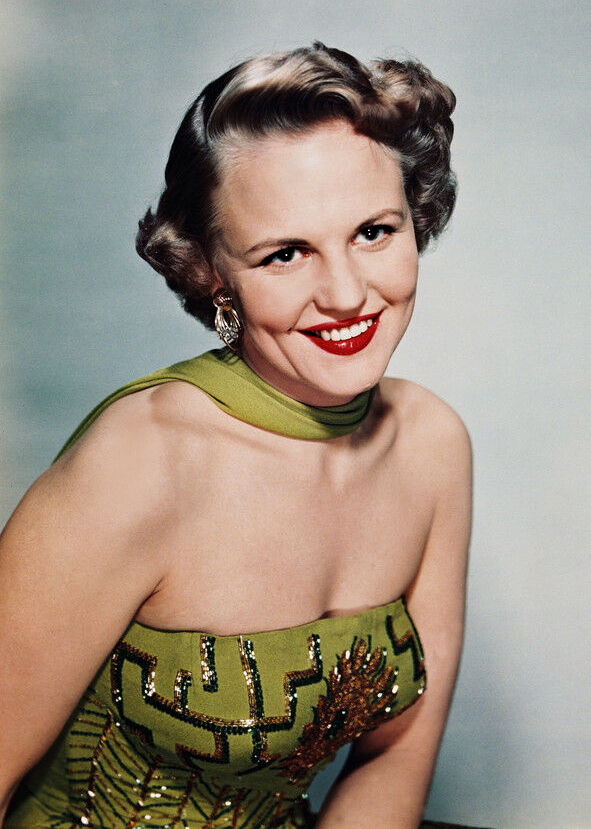
- A publicity photo of Peggy Lee, circa 1950.
- Studio albums: 40
- EPs: 46
- Live albums: 7
- Compilation albums: 91
- Video albums: 7
- Box sets: 7
- Other album appearances: 7

The albums discography of American singer-songwriter Peggy Lee contains 40 studio albums, 91 compilation albums, seven live albums, seven video albums, 46 extended plays (EP's), seven box sets and seven album appearances. Her debut studio album, Rendezvous with Peggy Lee, was released by Capitol Records in 1948. The Decca label issued Lee's next four studio albums, beginning with 1953's Black Coffee and ending with 1957's Dream Street. Her 1954 collaboration with Bing Crosby and Danny Kaye reached number two on the US Billboard Best-Selling LP's chart. A majority of Lee's studio LP's were issued with Capitol, which occurred between 1957 and 1972. Four of Lee's Capitol studio albums made the top 20 of US Billboard 200 chart through 1959: The Man I Love, Jump for Joy, Things Are Swingin' and Beauty and the Beat!.

The 1961 compilation, The Best of Peggy Lee, Vol. 2, was Lee's first to make the UK Albums Chart, rising to number 18. The Brunswick, Decca and Capitol labels issued non-charting compilations of Lee's work in the 1960s and 1970s. Meanwhile, her studio albums continued making chart positions in the 1960s, beginning with Latin ala Lee! (1960), which reached number eight in the UK and number 11 in the US. Her next five studio LP's did not make any chart positions until the release of Sugar 'n' Spice (1962), which made the US top 40. It was followed by the US-charting Mink Jazz (1963) and I'm a Woman (1963). Four more studio LP's made the US Billboard 200 during the decade: In the Name of Love (1964), Pass Me By (1965), Big $pender (1966) and Is That All There Is? (1969). The latter was also her only LP to make Canada's RPM chart.

Lee also recorded two live albums for Capitol, including 2 Shows Nightly (1969), which later made the US Jazz Albums chart. Capitol released four more studio albums by Lee, including US-charting Bridge Over Troubled Water (1970) and Make It with You (1970). Her last Capitol album was 1972's Norma Deloris Egstrom from Jamestown, North Dakota. Her remaining studio albums were issued by various labels. Her 1970s LP's included Let's Love (issued by Atlantic), Mirrors (issued by A&M), Peggy (issued by Polydor) and Close Enough for Love (issued by DRG). Her final studio album was the 1993 CD, Moments Like This (issued by Chesky).

The Capitol and MCA labels continued releasing Lee's material on compilations via CD and cassettes beginning in the 1990s. This included both solo and collaborations featuring Benny Goodman and Quincy Jones. These compilations began making chart entries in the 2000s. Her 2006 Christmas compilation, Christmas with Peggy Lee, placed at number 46 on the US Jazz Albums chart and number 22 on the US Traditional Jazz Albums chart. More of Lee's compilations made the US charts during the 2010s and 2020s. This included 2010's Come Rain or Come Shine, which placed at number 51 on the Billboard 200 and the top five on both the Jazz and Traditional Jazz charts. The Capitol release, Ultimate Peggy Lee (2020), reached the top 20 of the Jazz and Traditional Jazz charts. Both Ultimate Christmas (2020) and World Broadcast Recordings 1955, Vol. 1 (2021) made the Jazz chart top 20.

== Studio albums ==
=== 1940s and 1950s ===
List of studio albums, with selected chart positions, showing other details
Title	Album details	Peak chart positions		
Title	Album details	US	US Jazz	UK
Rendezvous with Peggy Lee	Released: March 1948; Label: Capitol; Formats: LP	—	—	—
Black Coffee	Released: 1953; Label: Decca; Formats: LP	—	24	20
Selections from Irving Berlin's White Christmas (with Bing Crosby and Danny Kaye)	Released: 1954; Label: Decca; Formats: LP	2	—	—
Songs from Pete Kelly's Blues (with Ella Fitzgerald)	Released: 1955; Label: Decca; Formats: LP	7	—	—
Dream Street	Released: 1957; Label: Decca; Formats: LP	—	—	—
The Man I Love	Released: 1957; Label: Capitol; Formats: LP	20	—	—
Jump for Joy	Released: 1958; Label: Decca; Formats: LP	15	—	—
Things Are Swingin'	Released: 1958; Label: Capitol; Formats: LP	16	—	—
I Like Men!	Released: 1959; Label: Capitol; Formats: LP	—	—	—
Beauty and the Beat! (with George Shearing)	Released: May 28, 1959; Label: Capitol; Formats: LP	19	—	16
"—" denotes a recording that did not chart or was not released in that territory.

=== 1960s ===
List of studio albums, with selected chart positions, showing other details
Title	Album details	Peak chart positions		
Title	Album details	US	CAN	UK
Latin ala Lee!	Released: January 1960; Label: Capitol; Formats: LP	11	—	8
Pretty Eyes	Released: August 1960; Label: Capitol; Formats: LP	—	—	—
Christmas Carousel	Released: October 1960; Label: Capitol; Formats: LP	—	—	—
Olé ala Lee!	Released: February 1961; Label: Capitol; Formats: LP	—	—	—
If You Go	Released: November 1961; Label: Capitol; Formats: LP	—	—	—
Blues Cross Country	Released: January 1962; Label: Capitol; Formats: LP	—	—	—
Sugar 'n' Spice	Released: August 1962; Label: Capitol; Formats: LP	40	—	—
Mink Jazz	Released: January 1963; Label: Capitol; Formats: LP	64	—	—
I'm a Woman	Released: July 1963; Label: Capitol; Formats: LP	76	—	—
In Love Again!	Released: February 1964; Label: Capitol; Formats: LP	—	—	—
In the Name of Love	Released: September 1964; Label: Capitol; Formats: LP	97	—	—
Pass Me By	Released: April 1965; Label: Capitol; Formats: LP	145	—	—
Then Was Then – Now Is Now!	Released: December 1965; Label: Capitol; Formats: LP	—	—	—
Guitars a là Lee	Released: August 1966; Label: Capitol; Formats: LP	—	—	—
Big $pender	Released: November 1966; Label: Capitol; Formats: LP	130	—	—
Somethin' Groovy!	Released: September 1967; Label: Capitol; Formats: LP	—	—	—
A Natural Woman	Released: June 1969; Label: Capitol; Formats: LP	—	—	—
Is That All There Is?	Released: November 1969; Label: Capitol; Formats: LP	55	62	—
"—" denotes a recording that did not chart or was not released in that territory.

=== 1970s ===
List of studio albums, with selected chart positions, showing other details
Title	Album details	Peak chart positions
Title	Album details	US
Bridge Over Troubled Water	Released: April 1970; Label: Capitol; Formats: LP	142
Make It with You	Released: November 1970; Label: Capitol; Formats: LP	194
Where Did They Go	Released: July 1971; Label: Capitol; Formats: LP	—
Norma Deloris Egstrom from Jamestown, North Dakota	Released: June 1972; Label: Capitol; Formats: LP	—
Let's Love	Released: October 1974; Label: Atlantic; Formats: LP	—
Mirrors	Released: October 1975; Label: A&M; Formats: LP	—
Peggy	Released: 1977; Label: Polydor; Formats: LP	—
Close Enough for Love	Released: 1979; Label: DRG; Formats: LP	—
"—" denotes a recording that did not chart or was not released in that territory.

=== 1980s and 1990s ===
List of studio albums, showing all relevant details
Title	Album details
Miss Peggy Lee Sings the Blues	Released: 1988; Label: Musicmasters; Formats: CD
The Peggy Lee Songbook: There'll Be Another Spring	Released: 1990; Label: Musicmasters; Formats: CD
Love Held Lightly: Rare Songs by Harold Arlen	Released: 1993; Label: Capitol; Formats: CD
Moments Like This	Released: 1993; Label: Chesky; Formats: CD

== Compilation albums ==
=== 1940s and 1950s ===
List of compilation albums, showing all relevant details
Title	Album details
Benny Goodman and Peggy Lee (with Benny Goodman)	Released: 1949; Label: Columbia; Formats: LP
My Best to You: Peggy Lee Sings	Released: 1950; Label: Capitol; Formats: LP
Capitol Presents...Peggy Lee	Released: 1953; Label: Capitol; Formats: LP
Songs in an Intimate Style	Released: 1954; Label: Decca; Formats: LP
Songs from Walt Disney's "Lady and the Tramp"	Released: 1955; Label: Decca; Formats: LP
Peggy Lee Sings with Benny Goodman (with Benny Goodman)	Released: 1957; Label: Harmony; Formats: LP
Sea Shells	Released: 1958; Label: Decca; Formats: LP
Miss Wonderful	Released: 1959; Label: Decca; Formats: LP

=== 1960s ===
List of compilation albums, with selected chart positions, showing other details
Title	Album details	Peak chart positions
Title	Album details	UK
The Best of Peggy Lee, Vol. 1	Released: 1961; Label: Brunswick; Formats: LP	—
The Best of Peggy Lee, Vol. 2	Released: 1961; Label: Brunswick; Formats: LP	18
My Greatest Songs	Released: 1963; Label: Brunswick; Formats: LP	—
Lover	Released: 1963; Label: Decca; Formats: LP	—
Extra Special!	Released: 1967; Label: Capitol; Formats: LP	—
Deluxe	Released: 1967; Label: Capitol; Formats: LP	—
This Is Peggy Lee	Released: 1967; Label: Capitol; Formats: LP	—
The Best of Peggy Lee	Released: 1968; Label: Capitol; Formats: LP	—
The Hits of Peggy Lee	Released: 1968; Label: Capitol Starline; Formats: LP	—
Peggy Lee's Greatest!	Released: 1969; Label: Capitol Starline; Formats: LP	—
Peggy Lee	Released: 1969; Label: Capitol; Formats: LP	—
"—" denotes a recording that did not chart or was not released in that territory.

=== 1970s ===
List of compilation albums, showing all relevant details
Title	Album details
Deluxe in Musical (with Nat King Cole and Nancy Wilson)	Released: 1971; Label: Capitol; Formats: LP
The Sounds of the Seventies	Released: 1971; Label: Capitol; Formats: LP
The Very Best of Peggy Lee	Released: 1973; Label: Capitol; Formats: LP, cassette
Super Deluxe	Released: 1973; Label: MCA; Formats: LP
The Shadow of Your Smile	Released: 1975; Label: Capitol; Formats: LP
I Left My Heart in San Francisco	Released: 1975; Label: Capitol; Formats: LP
16 Greatest Hits	Released: 1976; Label: Capitol; Formats: LP, cassette
Best 20	Released: 1976; Label: Capitol; Formats: LP
Rendez-vous with Peggy Lee	Released: 1976; Label: Capitol; Formats: LP
Golden Disc	Released: 1976; Label: MCA; Formats: LP
The Best of Peggy Lee	Released: 1976; Label: MCA; Formats: LP
Songs for My Man	Released: 1977; Label: Capitol; Formats: LP
Miss Peggy Lee Sings the Songs of Cy Coleman	Released: 1979; Label: Capitol; Formats: LP
A Portrait of Peggy Lee: 1941–1942	Released: 1979; Label: CBS/Sony; Formats: LP

=== 1980s ===
List of compilation albums, with selected chart positions, showing other details
Title	Album details	Peak chart positions
Title	Album details	NL
Jazz Oddisey: The Best of Peggy Lee	Released: 1980; Label: MCA; Formats: LP	—
The Best of Peggy Lee	Released: 1981; Label: MCA; Formats: LP, cassette	—
Lovers Rendez-vous	Released: 1981; Label: K-tel; Formats: LP, cassette	49
Eligidos	Released: 1981; Label: Capitol; Formats: LP	—
I'm a Woman	Released: 1982; Label: Capitol/EMI; Formats: LP	—
Peggy Lee's Greatest!	Released: 1982; Label: MGM; Formats: LP	—
Grootste Hits	Released: 1983; Label: Capitol; Formats: LP, cassette	—
Con Plumas	Released: 1983; Label: Capitol; Formats: LP	—
Greatest Hits	Released: 1984; Label: Capitol; Formats: LP	—
Bob Hope in Hollywood (with Bob Hope, Shirley Ross and Bing Crosby)	Released: 1984; Label: MCA; Formats: LP, cassette	—
Perfect-Lee	Released: 1984; Label: MCA; Formats: LP, cassette	—
20 Golden Greats	Released: 1984; Label: Capitol; Formats: LP, CD	—
Fever and Other Hits	Released: 1985; Label: Capitol; Formats: CD, cassette	—
Golden Greats	Released: 1985; Label: MCA; Formats: LP	—
Best 22 Songs	Released: 1986; Label: MCA; Formats: CD	
"—" denotes a recording that did not chart or was not released in that territory.

=== 1990s ===
List of compilation albums, showing all relevant details
Title	Album details
Capitol Collector Series, Vol 1: The Early Years	Released: May 21, 1990; Label: Capitol; Formats: CD
All-Time Greatest Hits, Vol. 1	Released: 1990; Label: Curb; Formats: CD, cassette
Golden Greats	Released: 1991; Label: MCA; Formats: CD
The Best of Peggy Lee: Fever	Released: 1992; Label: Capitol; Formats: CD, cassette
P's and Q's (with Quincy Jones)	Released: August 31, 1992; Label: Capitol; Formats: CD
Peggy Lee Sings with Benny Goodman (with Benny Goodman)	Released: 1992; Label: Sony; Formats: CD, cassette
You Give Me Fever	Released: 1993; Label: Polydor/Spectrum; Formats: CD
Classics: Her Original Capitol Recordings	Released: August 31, 1993; Label: Curb; Formats: CD
Peggy Lee	Released: 1993; Label: Capitol; Formats: CD
Best of Big Bands: Benny Goodman featuring Peggy Lee	Released: 1993; Label: Columbia; Formats: CD
Black Coffee and Other Delights: The Decca Anthology	Released: October 11, 1994; Label: MCA; Formats: CD
Greatest Hits	Released: 1994; Label: CEMA; Formats: CD, cassette
Spotlight on...Peggy Lee	Released: December 1995; Label: Capitol; Formats: CD, cassette
The Christmas Album	Released: 1996; Label: EMI Gold; Formats: CD
The Best of Peggy Lee: The Blues and Jazz Sessions	Released: November 18, 1997; Label: Capitol Jazz; Formats: CD
The Best of the Decca Years	Released: 1997; Label: MCA; Formats: CD
The Very Best of Peggy Lee	Released: 1997; Label: EMI; Formats: CD
Miss Peggy Lee	Released: April 21, 1998; Label: Capitol; Formats: CD, cassette
Johnny Guitar	Released: 1998; Label: MCA; Formats: CD
The Complete Recordings: 1941-1947	Released: June 15, 1999; Label: Columbia/Legacy; Formats: CD
The Best of Peggy Lee: The Capitol Years	Released: December 21, 1999; Label: EMI; Formats: CD
36 All-Time Greatest Hits	Released: 1999; Label: EMI; Formats: CD

=== 2000s ===
List of compilation albums, with selected chart positions, showing other details
Title	Album details	Peak chart positions	
Title	Album details	US Jazz	US Tra. Jazz
Trav'lin' Light	Released: February 29, 2000; Label: Capitol Jazz; Formats: CD	—	—
Rare Gems and Hidden Treasures	Released: July 18, 2000; Label: Capitol; Formats: CD	—	—
Christmas	Released: August 24, 2000; Label: EMI; Formats: CD	—	—
Peggy Lee Sings the Standards	Released: May 29, 2001; Label: EMI; Formats: CD	—	—
The Best of Peggy Lee	Released: 2001; Label: MCA; Formats: CD	—	—
20th Century Masters: The Millennium Collection	Released: June 4, 2002; Label: MCA; Formats: CD	—	—
Love Songs	Released: January 14, 2003; Label: Decca; Formats: CD	—	—
The Best of the Singles Collection	Released: June 10, 2003; Label: Capitol; Formats: CD	—	—
Classics and Collectibles	Released: December 2, 2003; Label: Universal; Formats: CD	—	—
The Very Best of Peggy Lee	Released: June 22, 2006; Label: Capitol/EMI; Formats: CD	—	—
Christmas with Peggy Lee	Released: September 26, 2006; Label: Capitol; Formats: CD	42	22
The Lost '40s and '50s Capitol Masters	Released: May 27, 2008; Label: Collector's Choice/EMI; Formats: CD	—	—
"—" denotes a recording that did not chart or was not released in that territory.

=== 2010s and 2020s ===
List of compilation albums, with selected chart positions, showing other details
Title	Album details	Peak chart positions			
Title	Album details	US	US Jazz	US Ind.	US Tra. Jazz
Come Rain or Come Shine	Released: April 19, 2010; Label: Starbucks; Formats: CD	51	2	7	2
Peggy Lee Christmas: 10 Great Songs	Released: 2012; Label: Capitol; Formats: CD	—	—	—	—
Icon: Christmas	Released: September 30, 2014; Label: Capitol; Formats: CD	—	—	—	—
Decca Rarities	Released: June 3, 2020; Label: Geffen; Formats: Digital	—	—	—	—
Ultimate Peggy Lee	Released: June 19, 2020; Label: Capitol; Formats: CD, digital	—	15	—	13
Ultimate Christmas	Released: September 15, 2020; Label: Capitol; Formats: CD, digital	—	20	—	—
World Broadcast Recordings 1955, Vol. 1	Released: July 17, 2021; Label: Og Music; Formats: LP	—	17	—	—
From the Vaults, Vol. 1	Released: March 8, 2024; Label: Capitol; Formats: Digital	—	—	—	—
From the Vaults, Vol. 2	Released: March 15, 2024; Label: Capitol; Formats: Digital	—	—	—	—
"—" denotes a recording that did not chart or was not released in that territory.

== Live albums ==
List of live albums, with selected chart positions, showing other details
Title	Album details	Peak chart positions	
Title	Album details	US Jazz	US Tra. Jazz
Basin Street East Proudly Presents Miss Peggy Lee	Released: 1961; Label: Capitol; Formats: LP	—	—
2 Shows Nightly	Released: 1968; Label: Capitol; Formats: LP	46	25
Live in London	Released: 1977; Label: Polydor; Formats: LP	—	—
Peggy At Basin Street East (The Unreleased Show Closing Night February 8, 1961)	Released: June 24, 2002; Label: Collector's Choice/EMI; Formats: CD	—	—
Peggy Lee on The Ed Sullivan Show 1950-1961	Released: April 15, 2022; Label: Sofa; Formats: Digital	—	—
Peggy Lee on The Ed Sullivan Show 1962	Released: April 20, 2022; Label: Sofa; Formats: Digital	—	—
Peggy Lee on The Ed Sullivan Show 1963-1969	Released: May 13, 2022; Label: Sofa; Formats: Digital	—	—
"—" denotes a recording that did not chart or was not released in that territory.

== Video albums ==
List of video albums, showing all relevant details
Title	Album details
The Quintessential Peggy Lee	Released: 1984; Label: NVC; Formats: VHS
Swing Era	Released: 2003; Label: Idem; Formats: DVD
Fever: The Music of Peggy Lee	Released: 2004; Label: Capitol; Formats: DVD
Singing at Her Best	Released: 2005; Label: Passport; Formats: DVD
In Concert Series	Released: 2006; Label: Passport; Formats: DVD
Christmas With Danny Kay Featuring Peggy Lee and Nat King Cole (with Danny Kaye and Nat King Cole)	Released: 2012; Label: Inception; Formats: DVD
Things Are Swingin': Her Greatest Songs	Released: 2020; Label: MPI Home Video; Formats: DVD

== Extended plays ==
=== 1950s ===
List of extended plays (EP's), showing all relevant details
Title	Album details
Selections Featured In The Warner Bros. Motion Picture The Jazz Singer (with Gordon Jenkins)	Released: 1952; Label: Decca; Formats: EP
Selections From The Musical Production Kismet (with Danny Kaye, The Four Aces and Al Alberts)	Released: 1953; Label: Decca; Formats: EP
Benny Goodman Presents Peggy Lee (with Benny Goodman)	Released: 1953; Label: Columbia; Formats: EP
Navidades Blancas (with Bing Crosby, Danny Kaye, The Skylarks and Trudy Stevens)	Released: 1954; Label: Columbia; Formats: EP
Songs from Pete Kelly's Blues	Released: 1955; Label: Decca; Formats: EP
Pete Kelly's Blues Volume 2	Released: 1956; Label: Brunswick; Formats: EP
Presenting Peggy Lee	Released: 1956; Label: Brunswick; Formats: EP
The Feminine Touch (with Pat Kirby)	Released: 1956; Label: Decca; Formats: EP
Hit Parade (with Rex Allen, Jeri Southern and Victor Young)	Released: 1957; Label: Brunswick; Formats: EP
Miss Peggy Lee	Released: 1957; Label: Brunswick; Formats: EP
The Man I Love Part 2	Released: 1957; Label: Capitol; Formats: EP
Fever	Released: 1958; Label: Capitol; Formats: EP
Things Are Swingin' Part 1	Released: 1958; Label: Capitol; Formats: EP
Jump for Joy	Released: 1958; Label: Capitol; Formats: EP
Lover (with Gordon Jenkins and His Orchestra)	Released: 1958; Label: Festival; Formats: EP
Sea Shells Part 1	Released: 1958; Label: Brunswick; Formats: EP
Sea Shells Part 2	Released: 1958; Label: Brunswick; Formats: EP
O. K.	Released: 1958; Label: Capitol; Formats: EP
Peggy with Benny (with Benny Goodman and His Sextet)	Released: 1958; Label: Philips; Formats: EP
Movie Parade, Vol. 5	Released: 1958; Label: Decca; Formats: EP
I Never Knew	Released: 1959; Label: Decca; Formats: EP
Alright, Okay, You Win/My Man	Released: 1959; Label: Capitol; Formats: EP
Sweetheart	Released: 1959; Label: Capitol; Formats: EP
Broadway Goes Hollywood (with Kirk Douglas)	Released: 1959; Label: Columbia; Formats: EP
Beauty and the Beat! (with George Shearing)	Released: 1959; Label: Capitol; Formats: EP
The Man I Love Part 3	Released: 1959; Label: Capitol; Formats: EP
I Like Men!	Released: 1959; Label: Capitol; Formats: EP

=== 1960s ===
List of extended plays (EP's), showing all relevant details
Title	Album details
Latin ala Lee!	Released: 1960; Label: Capitol; Formats: EP
Mañana	Released: 1961; Label: Capitol; Formats: EP
Peggy Lee Favourites	Released: 1961; Label: Capitol; Formats: EP
Olé Ala Lee!	Released: 1961; Label: Capitol; Formats: EP
The Newest From The Sound Capitol Of The World (with George Shearing)	Released: 1961; Label: Capitol; Formats: EP
Black Coffee	Released: 1962; Label: Festival; Formats: EP
Love Me or Leave Me	Released: 1962; Label: Festival; Formats: EP
The Swingin' Miss L	Released: 1962; Label: Festival; Formats: EP
Christmas Carousel	Released: 1963; Label: Capitol; Formats: EP
Sugar 'n' Spice	Released: 1963; Label: Capitol; Formats: EP
I'm a Woman	Released: 1963; Label: Capitol; Formats: EP
In the Name of Love	Released: 1964; Label: Capitol; Formats: EP
Sneakin' Up On You / I Go To Sleep / That's What It Takes / Love Theme From "The Sandpiper"	Released: 1965; Label: Capitol; Formats: EP
So What's New	Released: 1966; Label: Capitol; Formats: EP
Strangers in the Night	Released: 1966; Label: Capitol; Formats: EP

=== 1970s–2020s ===
List of extended plays (EP's), showing all relevant details
Title	Album details
Lady and the Tramp	Released: 1972; Label: Disneyland; Formats: EP
Fever/Alright, Okay, You Win/Golden Earrings/Manana	Released: 1977; Label: Capitol/EMI/Electrola; Formats: EP
Peggy Lee Love Songs	Released: January 1, 2006; Label: Capitol; Formats: Digital
Peggy Lee Love Songs	Released: February 5, 2021; Label: UMG; Formats: Digital

== Box sets ==
List of box sets, showing all relevant details
Title	Album details
Peggy Lee	Released: 1970; Label: Capitol; Formats: LP
Legendary Singers	Released: 1985; Label: Time Life; Formats: LP
C'est Magnifique	Released: 1998; Label: EMI; Formats: CD
Miss Peggy Lee	Released: 1998; Label: Capitol; Formats: CD
The Singles Collection	Released: 2002; Label: Capitol; Formats: CD
The Peggy Lee Story	Released: 2002; Label: Proper; Formats: CD
Miss Wonderful	Released: 2006; Label: Proper; Formats: CD

== Other album appearances ==
List of non-single guest appearances, with other performing artists, showing year released and album name
Title	Year	Other artist(s)	Album	Ref.
"We Think the West Coast Is the Best Coast"	1957	Mel Tormé	Mel Tormé's California Suite (Note: Peggy Lee is credited as a guest vocalist on this album under the pseudonym "Susan Melton".)	
"Coney Island"	1957	Mel Tormé	Mel Tormé's California Suite	
"The Miami Waltz"	1957	Mel Tormé	Mel Tormé's California Suite	
"Got the Date on the Golden Gate"	1957	Mel Tormé	Mel Tormé's California Suite	
"We Think the West Coast Is the Best Coast (Reprise)"	1957	Mel Tormé	Mel Tormé's California Suite	
"You Were Meant for Me"	1993	Michael Franks	Dragonfly Summer	
"I See You"	1996	Benny Carter	Songbook	
