= Where Did They Go =

Where Did They Go may refer to:

- "Where Did They Go" (song), a 1972 single by Sandie Shaw, also recorded by Peggy Lee and Diana Dors
- Where Did They Go (album), a 1971 album by Peggy Lee
