= A Natural Woman (album) =

Studio album by Peggy Lee
- Released: June 1969
- Recorded: January 31, February 12, 15 & 28, 1969
- Studio: Capitol Tower, Hollywood, California
- Genre: Jazz
- Length: 32:47
- Label: Capitol
- Producer: Phil Wright

Peggy Lee chronology
| 2 Shows Nightly (1968) | A Natural Woman (1969) | Is That All There Is? (1969) |

A Natural Woman is a 1969 album by Peggy Lee. It was arranged and conducted by Bobby Bryant and Mike Melvoin. John Engstead took the cover photograph.

== Track listing ==
1. "(All of a Sudden) My Heart Sings" (Jean Blanvillain, Henri Herpin, Harold Rome) - 2:15
2. "Don't Explain" (Billie Holiday, Arthur Herzog Jr.) - 3:57
3. "Can I Change My Mind?" (Barry Despenza, Carl Wolfolk) - 2:15
4. "Lean On Me" (Peggy Lee, Mundell Lowe, Mike Melvoin) - 2:42
5. "(Sittin' on) the Dock of the Bay" (Steve Cropper, Otis Redding) - 2:37
6. "(You Make Me Feel Like) A Natural Woman" (Gerry Goffin, Carole King, Jerry Wexler) - 3:01
7. "Everyday People" (Sylvester Stewart) - 2:38
8. "Please Send Me Someone to Love" (Percy Mayfield) - 4:05
9. "Spinning Wheel" (David Clayton-Thomas) - 2:35
10. "Living Is Dying Without You" (Al Kasha, Joel Hirschhorn) - 3:27
11. "I Think It's Going to Rain Today" (Randy Newman) - 3:15

== Notes ==
The recording sessions for this album took place at the Capitol Tower in Hollywood, California.

During the sessions for this album, Lee also recorded the songs "No More" (which was included on the 2008 Collectors' Choice Music CD reissue of Make It With You and Where Did They Go), and "We're Gonna Make It" (which remains unreleased).
