= Close Enough for Love (Peggy Lee album) =

Studio album by Peggy Lee
- Released: 1979
- Recorded: May 30–31, 1979
- Genre: Jazz, disco
- Length: 36:39
- Label: DRG SL5190
- Producer: Hugh Fordin

Peggy Lee chronology
Peggy (1977)	Close Enough for Love (1979)	Miss Peggy Lee Sings the Blues (1988)

Close Enough for Love is a 1979 studio album by jazz singer Peggy Lee.

The album was Lee's first recording in the United States since her 1975 album Mirrors. The album was Lee's only recording for DRG Records, and featured Lee with her regular quartet.

== Reception ==
Professional ratings
Review scores
Source	Rating
Allmusic	2.5/5 stars

Reviewing the album for AllMusic, JT Griffith said that "Peggy Lee's voice sounds a bit depressed on this album, indicating, perhaps, an unfamiliarity with the new musical trappings. But that quality also gives the album's more straightforward numbers, like "Rain Sometimes" and "Come in From the Rain" (sounding like Wings), a moving, somber tone. An example of a dated album, but one that is a ripe for a rediscovery."

== Track listing ==
1. "You" (Tom Snow) – 4:04
2. "Easy Does It" (Richard P. Hazard, Peggy Lee) – 3:28
3. "Close Enough for Love" (Johnny Mandel, Paul Williams) – 3:55
4. "A Robinsong" (Michael Franks) – 3:18
5. "Just One of Those Things" (Cole Porter) – 2:48
6. "I Can't Resist You" (Walter Donaldson, Will Donaldson, Ned Wever) – 4:33
7. "Come in from the Rain" (Melissa Manchester, Carole Bayer Sager) – 3:07
8. "In the Days of Our Love" (Lee, Marian McPartland) – 3:18
9. "Through the Eyes of Love" (Marvin Hamlisch, Sager) – 3:11
10. "Rain Sometimes" (Arthur Hamilton) – 3:55

== Personnel ==
Performance

- Peggy Lee – vocals
- Ian Underwood – Keyboards
- Max Bennett – bass
- Dennis Budimir, John Chiodini, John Pisano – guitar
- John Guerin – percussion, drums

Production

- Hans Alvers – photography
- Tchad Blake – engineer, assistant engineer
- Sibbi Chalawick – art direction
- Hugh Fordin – producer
- Will Friedwald – liner notes
- LuAnn Graffeo – art direction
- Geoff Howe – engineer, mixing, mixing engineer
- Richard Hazard – arranger, conductor
- Dan O'Leary – reissue producer
- Van-John Sfiridis – production supervisor
- Alan Silverman – remastering
