= Don't Smoke in Bed (song) =

Song by Nina Simone

from the album Little Girl Blue
- Released: 1958
- Recorded: 1957
- Genre: Jazz
- Label: Bethlehem
- Songwriter: Willard Robison

"Don't Smoke in Bed" is a jazz song originally composed and recorded by Willard Robison and later associated with a recording by Nina Simone released on her 1958 debut album Little Girl Blue.

The song had been first recorded by Peggy Lee in 1947 with Dave Barbour and His Orchestra and released on her album Rendezvous with Peggy Lee (1948). The liner notes to Peggy Lee: The Singles Collection suggest that the song was mostly written by Lee and Barbour from a few lines by Robison as they were concerned that Robison would not live long enough to finish the song, and wanted to gift him with a valuable copyright to provide for his daughter after his death. In the event, Robison lived another 20 years.

Other artists who have recorded the song include Corry Brokken (Corry's Bed-Time Story, 1958), Connie Russell (Don't Smoke in Bed, 1959), Julie London (Around Midnight, 1960), Rod McKuen (Stranger in Town, 1961), Jack Teagarden (Think Well of Me , 1962), Teresa Brewer (Moments to Remember, 1964), Mary Coughlan (Under the Influence, 1987), Elkie Brooks (Round Midnight, 1993), Holly Cole (Don't Smoke in Bed, 1993), Patti Smith (Ain't Nuthin' But a She Thing, 1995), Carly Simon (Film Noir, 1997), k.d. lang (Drag, 1997), Janet Seidel (Don't Smoke in Bed - Songs in the Key of Peggy Lee, 2002), Rita Coolidge (And So Is Love , 2005), and Xiu Xiu (Nina, 2013), Coppe' feat. Nikakoi From the Album Milk, produced by Nikakoi October 6, 2017.

In 2017 Marlene Dietrich's version from her Warsaw concerts was released by Polskie Radio on CD and digital download.
