= River River =

Single by Peggy Lee with Gordon Jenkins and his orchestra
- A-side: "River River" "Sans Souci"
- Released: 1952
- Label: Decca
- Songwriters: Ben Oakland; Bob Russell

"River River" is a song written by Ben Oakland and Bob Russell that was a hit for Peggy Lee with Gordon Jenkins and his orchestra in 1952.

== Critical reception ==
Professional ratings
Review scores
Source	Rating
Billboard	favorable
Billboard	favorable

Billboard favorably reviewed Peggy Lee's recording (Decca 28395, coupled with "Sans Souci") in its issue from October 4, 1952.

== Track listing ==
78 rpm (Decca 28395)

(L 6849)
No.	Title	Writer(s)	Note(s)	Length
1.	"River River"	Ben Oakland; Bob Russell	Peggy Lee with Gordon Jenkins and his orchestra Vocal with orchestra	3:10

(L 6848)
No.	Title	Writer(s)	Note(s)	Length
1.	"Sans Souci"	Sonny Burke; Peggy Lee	Peggy Lee with Gordon Jenkins and his orchestra Vocal with orchestra	3:19
