= Let's Love (album) =

Studio album by Peggy Lee
- Released: October 1974
- Recorded: April – June 1974
- Venues: Record Plant, Los Angeles
- Genres: Vocal jazz; Contemporary Pop
- Length: 39:54 (Original release); 55:10 (CD Reissue)
- Label: Atlantic
- Producers: Dave Grusin, Peggy Lee

Peggy Lee chronology
Norma Deloris Egstrom from Jamestown, North Dakota (1972)	Let's Love (1974)	Mirrors (1975)

Singles from Let's Love
- 1. "Let's Love" Released: October 1964

Let's Love is an album by jazz singer Peggy Lee that was released in 1974. It was her first for Atlantic Records after many years with Capitol. The title track was written, arranged, produced by Paul McCartney. The album received a highly positive critical reception.

== Background ==
In 1974, Peggy Lee changed labels from her longtime Capitol to Atlantic Records. The album did not receive enough commercial attention for the Atlantic contract to last long, and she switched to A&M Records for her following studio album. The lead single, however, was a commercial success and did well on adult contemporary-oriented stations.

This title song came about when Peggy Lee was in London performing at the Royal Albert Hall in 1974. She invited Paul McCartney and his wife Linda to dinner at The Dorchester. McCartney brought a gift for Lee which was a song he had written with Linda called "Let's Love". Arrangements were made for the song to be recorded in June 1974 at the Record Plant in Los Angeles with McCartney producing.

== Critical reception ==
Professional ratings
Review scores
Source	Rating
AllMusic	3.5/5 stars

=== Contemporary ===
Peter Reilly on Stereo Review believed that "there is really very little different here from Lee's work of the past decade," but said that "She is still the ultimate but unstrained perfectionist, still the most mesmerizing popular recording performer of our time, and still brings to bear on every piece of material she records her musical elegance." Reilly also highlighted Irving Berlin's "Always" stating, "Her performance of 'Always' is one of classic beauty in every sense."

=== Retrospective ===
William Ruhlmann of AllMusic stated that "As on her later Capitol albums, she presented her versions of recent hits like James Taylor's 'Don't Let Me Be Lonely Tonight' and the Stylistics' 'You Make Me Feel Brand New.'" Echoing Reilly's assessment of "Always," he observed that when Lee and Grusin recorded a standard of the kind she had been performing for decades, "they made a point of transforming it."

== Chart performance and singles ==
The album failed to return Lee to the album charts following her last entry four years earlier with Make It with You. The lead single "Let's Love" became her final single to chart. It debuted on the Billboard Easy Listening chart on November 2, 1974, reaching No. 22 during an eight-week run on it.

== Track listing ==
No.	Title	Writer(s)	Length
1.	"Let's Love"	Paul McCartney, Linda McCartney	2:58
2.	"He Is the One"	Melissa Manchester	4:24
3.	"Easy Evil"	Alan O'Day	4:36
4.	"Don't Let Me Be Lonely Tonight"	James Taylor	4:04
5.	"Always"	Irving Berlin	3:51
6.	"You Make Me Feel Brand New"	Thom Bell, Linda Creed	5:55
7.	"Sweet Lov'liness"	Max R. Bennett	3:53
8.	"The Heart Is a Lonely Hunter"	Dave Grusin, Peggy Lee	3:04
9.	"Sweet Talk"	Don Sebesky	3:24
10.	"Sometimes"	Henry Mancini, Felice Mancini	2:25
11.	"Let's Love (reprise)"	Paul McCartney, Linda McCartney	1:20

CD reissue bonus tracks

No.	Title	Writer(s)	Length
12.	"I Am His Lady"	Morgan Ames	4:00
13.	"I Wanna Be Seduced"	Gary Tigerman	2:31
14.	"The Nickel Ride"	Dave Grusin, Peggy Lee	4:48
15.	"Let's Keep Dancing"	Bobby Troup, Clifton T. Crofford, John Durrill, Snuff Garrett	4:48
16.	"Let's Love (alternate version)"	Paul McCartney, Linda McCartney	3:57

== Personnel ==
- Peggy Lee – vocals
- Chuck Findley – trumpet
- Frank Rosolino – trombone
- Vincent DeRosa – French horn
- Gene Cipriano – oboe
- Jerome Richardson – alto and soprano saxophones
- Pete Christlieb – tenor saxophone, flute
- Dennis Budimir – guitar
- Dan Ferguson – guitar
- Lee Ritenour – guitar
- David T. Walker – guitar
- Geoffrey Gaffney – keyboards
- Dave Grusin – keyboards
- Dick Borden – drums
- Harvey Mason – drums
- Chuck Rainey – bass guitar
- Bobbye Hall – congas
