= Rendezvous with Peggy Lee =

Studio album by Peggy Lee
- Released: March 1948
- Recorded: November 1947
- Genre: Vocal jazz
- Label: Capitol

Peggy Lee chronology
| Rendezvous with Peggy Lee (1948) | My Best to You (1950) |

Rendezvous with Peggy Lee is the debut solo album by Peggy Lee, released on Capitol Records in 1948 on three 78 rpm shellac records. Backed by husband Dave Barbour and His Orchestra, the original record featured five jazz standards and one original composition, "Don't Smoke in Bed", which itself later became a standard. The original tune was co-penned by Lee, Barbour, and Willard Robison, but was credited only to Robison after he fell seriously ill. The album reached number two on the Billboard Best-Selling Popular Record Albums chart.

Will Davidson wrote for the Chicago Sunday Tribune, "the records represent Peggy's best. Not all of them ARE her best, but all are worthy examples of her work. Several are stupendous."

== Track listings ==
=== 3-disc 78rpm shellac album set (Capitol CC-72) ===
- 10118A "Why Don't You Do Right (Get Me Some Money Too)" (Joe McCoy) (2:26)
- 10118B "I Can't Give You Anything But Love" (Jimmy McHugh, Dorothy Fields) (2:32)
- 10119A "Them There Eyes" (Maceo Pinkard, Doris Tauber, William Tracey) (2:55)
- 10119B "Stormy Weather (Keeps Rainin' All The Time)" (Harold Arlen, Ted Koehler) (3:07)
- 10120A "'Deed I Do" (Fred Rose, Walter Hirsch) (3:05)
- 10120B "Don't Smoke in Bed" (Willard Robison) (3:11)

=== 10" vinyl album (Capitol H-151, released 1950) ===
- A1 "Why Don't You Do Right (Get Me Some Money Too)"
- A2 "Them There Eyes"
- A3 "'Deed I Do"
- A4 "I Don't Know Enough About You" (Barbour, Lee)
- B1 "I Can't Give You Anything but Love"
- B2 "Stormy Weather (Keeps Rainin' All The Time)"
- B3 "Don't Smoke in Bed"
- B4 "While We're Young" (Wilder, Palitz, Engvick)

=== 12" vinyl album (Capitol T-151, released 1955) ===
- A1 "Why Don't You Do Right (Get Me Some Money Too)"
- A2 "Them There Eyes"
- A3 "'Deed I Do"
- A4 "I Don't Know Enough About You"
- A5 "It's a Good Day" (Barbour, Lee)
- A6 "Golden Earrings" (Livingston, Evans, Young)
- B1 "I Can't Give You Anything but Love"
- B2 "Stormy Weather (Keeps Rainin' All the Time)"
- B3 "Don't Smoke in Bed"
- B4 "While We're Young"
- B5 "Mañana (Is Soon Enough for Me)" (Barbour, Lee)
- B6 "Hold Me" (Oppenheim, Schuster, Little)
