= Is That All There Is? (album) =

Studio album by Peggy Lee
- Released: November 1969
- Recorded: Jun 8, 1967 – Oct 15, 1969
- Genre: Vocal jazz
- Length: 36:24
- Label: Capitol
- Producer: Phil Wright, Jerry Leiber, Mike Stoller, Dave Cavanaugh

Peggy Lee chronology
A Natural Woman (1969)	Is That All There Is? (1969)	Bridge Over Troubled Water (1970)

Is That All There Is? is a 1969 studio album by Peggy Lee, featuring arrangements by Randy Newman. The eponymous title track won Lee the Grammy Award for Best Contemporary Vocal Performance, Female at the 12th Grammy Awards.

Professional ratings
Review scores
Source	Rating
Allmusic	4.5/5 stars

== Track listing ==
1. "Is That All There Is?" (Jerry Leiber, Mike Stoller) – 4:20
2. "Love Story" (Randy Newman) – 3:27
3. "Me and My Shadow" (Al Jolson, Billy Rose, Dave Dreyer) – 3:04
4. "My Old Flame" (Sam Coslow, Arthur Johnston) – 4:24
5. "I'm a Woman" (Jerry Leiber, Mike Stoller) – 2:09
6. "Brother Love's Travelling Salvation Show" (Neil Diamond) – 3:00
7. "Something" (George Harrison) – 3:14
8. "Whistle for Happiness" (Jerry Leiber, Mike Stoller) – 3:25
9. "Johnny (Linda)" (Randy Newman) – 2:47
10. "Don't Smoke in Bed" (Willard Robison) – 3:31

== Personnel ==
- Peggy Lee – vocals
- Randy Newman – arranger, conductor on "Is That All There Is?"
- Mundell Lowe – arranger, conductor
- Bobby Bryant – arranger, conductor
- Benny Carter – arranger, conductor
- Mike Melvoin – arranger, conductor
- William George – illustration
