= Dream Street (Peggy Lee album) =

Studio album by Peggy Lee
- Released: 1957
- Recorded: June 5–7, 1956
- Studio: Capitol (Hollywood)
- Genre: Vocal jazz
- Length: 35:09
- Label: Decca
- Producer: Dave Cavanaugh

Peggy Lee chronology
Black Coffee (1956)	Dream Street (1957)	Songs from Walt Disney's "Lady and the Tramp" (1957)

Professional ratings
Review scores
Source	Rating
Allmusic	4.5/5 stars

Dream Street is an album by jazz singer Peggy Lee that was released in 1957.

== Track listing ==
No.	Title	Writer(s)	Length
1.	"Street of Dreams"	Sam M. Lewis, Victor Young	3:22
2.	"What's New?"	Johnny Burke, Bob Haggart	2:59
3.	"You're Blasé"	Ord Hamilton, Bruce Sievier	2:50
4.	"It's All Right with Me"	Cole Porter	2:24
5.	"My Old Flame"	Sam Coslow, Arthur Johnston	2:38
6.	"Dancing on the Ceiling"	Richard Rodgers Lorenz Hart	3:40
7.	"It Never Entered My Mind"	Rodgers, Hart	3:01
8.	"Too Late Now"	Burton Lane, Alan Jay Lerner	3:49
9.	"I've Grown Accustomed to His Face"	Lerner, Frederick Loewe	2:47
10.	"Something I Dreamed Last Night"	Sammy Fain, Herb Magidson, Jack Yellen	2:29
11.	"Last Night When We Were Young"	Harold Arlen, Yip Harburg	2:56
12.	"So Blue"	Lew Brown, Buddy DeSylva, Ray Henderson	2:14

== Personnel ==
- Peggy Lee – vocals
- Lou Levy – piano
