= Mink Jazz =

Studio album by Peggy Lee
- Released: January 1963
- Recorded: March 28, 1962, February 2, 5, 7, 1963
- Genre: Vocal jazz
- Length: 28:39
- Label: Capitol
- Producer: David Cavanaugh

Peggy Lee chronology
Sugar 'n' Spice (1962)	Mink Jazz (1963)	I'm a Woman (1963)

Professional ratings
Review scores
Source	Rating
Allmusic	2.5/5 stars

Mink Jazz is a 1963 studio album by Peggy Lee, arranged by Benny Carter and Max Bennett.

== Track listing ==
1. "It's a Big Wide Wonderful World" (John Rox) – 1:37
2. "Whisper Not" (Leonard Feather, Benny Golson) – 2:17
3. "My Silent Love" (Edward Heyman, Dana Suesse) – 2:33
4. "The Lady Is a Tramp" (Lorenz Hart, Richard Rodgers) – 2:31
5. "Days of Wine and Roses" (Henry Mancini, Johnny Mercer) – 3:08
6. "As Long as I Live" (Harold Arlen, Ted Koehler) – 2:00
7. "I Won't Dance" (Dorothy Fields, Oscar Hammerstein II, Otto Harbach, Jerome Kern, Jimmy McHugh) – 2:03
8. "Cloudy Morning" (Marvin Fisher, Joseph McCarthy) – 2:40
9. "I Could Write a Book" (Hart, Rodgers) – 2:08
10. "I Never Had A Chance" (Irving Berlin) – 2:39
11. "Close Your Eyes" (Bernice Petkere) – 2:18
12. "Where Can I Go Without You?" (Peggy Lee, Victor Young) – 2:46

== Musicians ==
  - Tracks 1, 4–9, 11, 12
- Max Bennett - Leader (arranger) and bass
- Justin Gordon - Tenor sax and flute
- Jack Sheldon - Trumpet
- Bob Corwin - Piano
- Stan Levey - Drums
- John Pisano - Guitar
- Francisco Aguabella - Latin percussion
  - Tracks 2, 10
- Benny Carter - Leader (Arranger)
- Justin Gordon - Tenor sax and flute
- Max Bennett - Bass
- Mel Lewis - Drums
- Herb Ellis & Al Hendrickson - Guitars
- Lou Levy - Piano
- Francisco Pozo - Latin Percussion
  - Track 3
- Same as tracks 2, 10, less Gordon and Pozo, with Harry Klee on tenor sax

== Production ==
- Recorded at Studio B, Capitol Records, Hollywood
- John Kraus - Recording engineer
- John Engstead - Cover photo
