= Big $pender =

Studio album by Peggy Lee
- Released: November 1966
- Recorded: October 27, 1965 – February 1, 1966
- Genre: Jazz, vocal jazz
- Length: 28:29
- Label: Capitol
- Producer: Dave Cavanaugh

Peggy Lee chronology
Guitars a là Lee (1965)	Big $pender (1966)	Extra Special! (1967)

Professional ratings
Review scores
Source	Rating
Allmusic	3/5 stars

Big $pender is a 1966 studio album by Peggy Lee. It was recorded with the orchestra of Bill Holman

== Chart performance ==
The album debuted on Billboard magazine's Top LP's chart in the issue dated July 22, 1966, peaking at No. 130 during a three-week run on the chart.

The namesake single debuted on the Billboard Easy Listening chart in the issue dated January 29, 1966, reaching number 9 during a twelve-week stay on the chart. The follow-up single, "You've Got Possibilities" was ranked lower at number 36.

== Track listing ==
1. "Come Back to Me" (Burton Lane, Alan Jay Lerner) - 2:17
2. "You've Got Possibilities" (Charles Strouse, Lee Adams) - 2:10
3. "It's a Wonderful World" (Jan Savitt, Leo Watson, Harold Adamson) - 1:48
4. "I'll Only Miss Him When I Think of Him" (Jimmy Van Heusen, Sammy Cahn) - 2:48
5. "Big Spender" (Cy Coleman, Dorothy Fields) - 2:07
6. "I Must Know" (Neal Hefti, Lil Mattis) - 2:48
7. "Alright, Okay, You Win" (Sid Wyche, Mayme Watts) - 2:26
8. "Watch What Happens" (Michel Legrand, Norman Gimbel) - 3:09
9. "Touch the Earth" (Jeri Southern, Gail Allen) - 2:30
10. "You Don't Know" (Walter Spriggs) - 2:37
11. "Let's Fall in Love" (Harold Arlen, Ted Koehler) - 2:04
12. "Gotta Travel On" (Paul Clayton) - 1:45

== Charts ==
=== Album ===
Chart (1966)	Peak position
US Billboard Top LPs	130

=== Singles ===
Year	Single	Chart	Peak position
1966	"Big Spender"	US Billboard; Easy Listening	9
1966	"You've Got Possibilities"	US Billboard; Easy Listening	36
