= Peggy (album) =

Studio album by Peggy Lee
- Released: 1977
- Recorded: March 7–9, 1977
- Studio: CBS Studios, London
- Genre: Jazz
- Length: 42:39
- Label: Polydor
- Producer: Ken Barnes

Peggy Lee chronology
Live in London (1977)	Peggy (1977)	Close Enough for Love (1977)

Peggy is a 1977 album by Peggy Lee that was arranged and conducted by Pete Moore.

== Track listing ==
1. "The Hungry Years" (Neil Sedaka, Howard Greenfield) - 3:25
2. "Here Now" (Mark A. Trujillo, Dan Kimpel) - 3:16
3. "I Go to Rio" (Peter Allen, Adrienne Anderson) - 2:42
4. "I'm Not in Love" (Graham Gouldman, Eric Stewart) - 4:42
5. "Star Sounds" (Johnny Mercer) - 3:30
6. "What I Did for Love" (Edward Kleban, Marvin Hamlisch) - 3:39
7. "Misty" (Johnny Burke, Erroll Garner) -3:19
8. "Every Little Movement" (Otto Harbach, Karl Hoschna) - 3:10
9. "Courage, Madam" (Peggy Lee, Pete Moore) - 4:15
10. "Switchin' Channels" (Ken Barnes, Moore) - 3:15
11. "Just for Tonight" (Jan Jessel, Ray Jessel) - 3:20
12. "Lover" (Richard Rodgers, Lorenz Hart) - 4:06

== Personnel ==
- Peggy Lee – vocals
- Arranged By, Music Director – Pete Moore
- Backing Vocals – Clare Torry, Joan Baxter, Maggie Stredder, Peggy Lee
- Sleeve Design – Bill Smith
- Photography By – Hans Albers
- Producer – Ken Barnes
- Synthesizer – Pete Moore
- Programmed By – Dave Lawson
