= 2 Shows Nightly =

Live album by Peggy Lee
- Released: 1968
- Recorded: April 22–24, 1968
- Venue: Copacabana, 625 W 51st Street, New York, NY
- Genre: Vocal jazz
- Length: 36:15
- Label: Capitol ST 105
- Producer: Charles Koppelman, Don Rubin

Peggy Lee chronology
Somethin' Groovy! (1967)	2 Shows Nightly (1968)	A Natural Woman (1969)

2 Shows Nightly is a 1968 live album by Peggy Lee.

At Lee's request, this album was abruptly withdrawn from circulation almost immediately after its release in 1968.

== Track listing ==
No.	Title	Writer(s)	Length
1.	"Do I Hear a Waltz?"	Richard Rodgers, Stephen Sondheim	2:27
2.	"By the Time I Get to Phoenix"	Jimmy Webb	4:13
3.	"Reason to Believe"	Tim Hardin	2:31
4.	"Didn't Want to Have to Do It"	John B. Sebastian	3:05
5.	"My Personal Property"	Cy Coleman, Dorothy Fields	2:06
6.	"Hand on the Plow"	Traditional, arranged Peggy Lee, Mundell Loewe	2:41
7.	"Until It's Time for You to Go"	Buffy St. Marie	4:18
8.	"Somethin' Stupid"	C. Carson Parks	2:02
9.	"What Is a Woman?"	Harvey Schmidt, Tom Jones	4:49
10.	"Alright, Okay, You Win"	Sid Wyche, Mayme Watts	2:16
11.	"Here's to You"	Lee, Richard Hazard	3:23
12.	"Come Back to Me"	Alan Jay Lerner, Burton Lane	2:24

=== 2010 reissue bonus tracks ===
13. "Make Believe" – (1964; previously unavailable on Peggy Lee solo CD)
14. "Stay with Me" – (1966 single; CD debut; previously unreleased stereo mix)
15. "Happy Feet" – (1966 single; CD debut; previously unreleased stereo mix)
16. "That Man" – (1966 single; previously unavailable on Peggy Lee solo CD; previously unreleased album mix)
17. "I Feel It" – (1967 single)
18. "The Lonesome Road" – (1967 single; CD debut; previously unreleased stereo mix)
19. "I Wound It Up" – (1967; CD debut; previously unreleased)
20. "Money" – (1968; CD debut; previously unreleased)
21. "Misty Roses" – (1968 single)
22. "It'll Never Happen Again" – (1968 single)
23. "Reason to Believe" – (1968 single; CD debut)
24. "Didn’t Want to Have to Do It" – (1968 single)
