= The Man I Love (album) =

Studio album by Peggy Lee
- Released: 1957
- Recorded: April 2 – August 30, 1957
- Genre: Vocal jazz
- Length: 40:11
- Label: Capitol

Peggy Lee chronology
Songs from Walt Disney's Lady and the Tramp (1957)	The Man I Love (1957)	Sea Shells (1958)

The Man I Love is an album by jazz singer Peggy Lee with an orchestra arranged by Nelson Riddle and conducted by Frank Sinatra. This was Lee's first album after returning to Capitol.

== Reception ==
Professional ratings
Review scores
Source	Rating
AllMusic	3.5/5 stars

AllMusic gave the album three and a half stars. Critic William Ruhlmann wrote that "It wouldn't be surprising to find that Sinatra directed Lee to sing like one of his favorite singers, Billie Holiday, since she often does, laying back in understated vocal performances to reinforce the near-victimhood of the woman depicted in the songs." Nelson Riddle's "lush strings...hint of dark things" in "a superb pairing of singer, conductor, and arranger".

== Track listing ==
1. "The Man I Love" (George Gershwin, Ira Gershwin) – 3:45
2. "Please Be Kind" (Sammy Cahn, Saul Chaplin) – 4:14
3. "Happiness Is a Thing Called Joe" (Harold Arlen, Yip Harburg) – 4:05
4. "(Just One Way to Say) I Love You" (Irving Berlin) – 2:53
5. "That's All" (Alan Brandt, Bob Haymes) – 2:55
6. "Something Wonderful" (Oscar Hammerstein II, Richard Rodgers) – 3:15
7. "He's My Guy" (Gene de Paul, Don Raye) – 4:13
8. "Then I'll Be Tired of You" (Harburg, Arthur Schwartz) – 2:28
9. "My Heart Stood Still" (Rodgers, Lorenz Hart) – 2:45
10. "If I Should Lose You" (Ralph Rainger, Leo Robin) – 2:23
11. "There Is No Greater Love" (Isham Jones, Marty Symes) – 3:38
12. "The Folks Who Live on the Hill" (Hammerstein, Jerome Kern) – 3:37

== Personnel ==
- Peggy Lee – vocals
- Frank Sinatra - conductor
- Nelson Riddle - arranger
