= Mirrors (Peggy Lee album) =

Studio album by Peggy Lee
- Released: October 17, 1975
- Genre: Vocal jazz
- Length: 42:57
- Label: A&M
- Producer: Jerry Leiber, Mike Stoller

Peggy Lee chronology
Let's Love (1974)	Mirrors (1975)	Live in London (1977)

Professional ratings
Review scores
Source	Rating
Allmusic	3/5 stars

Mirrors is a 1975 album by Peggy Lee on A&M Records. The album is made up of neo-cabaret "art songs" sung by Peggy, written and produced by rock & roll pioneers Jerry Leiber and Mike Stoller and mostly arranged & conducted by Johnny Mandel.

== Track listing ==
All lyrics by Jerry Leiber; all music by Mike Stoller

1. "Is That All There Is?" – 4:21 (see notes)
2. "Ready to Begin Again (Manya's Song)" – 3:26
3. "Some Cats Know" – 4:18
4. "I've Got Them Feelin' Too Good Today Blues" – 2:20
5. "A Little White Ship" – 3:10
6. "Tango" – 5:21
7. "Professor Hauptmann's Performing Dogs" – 5:40
8. "The Case of M. J." – 2:54
9. "I Remember" – 2:51
10. "Say It" – 3:58
11. "Longings for a Simpler Time" – 3:54

== Notes ==
"Is That All There Is?" was recorded in January 1969 and originally released as a single on Capitol Records the following September. It reached #11 on the Billboard Pop charts and #1 on the Adult Contemporary charts, and Peggy Lee won a Grammy Award for her performance in March, 1970.

This unexpected success provided the impetus for an entire album of similar material. However, instead of recording a fully realized follow-up album, Capitol's November 1969 Is That All There Is? LP was hastily assembled from one new October recording date and a variety of sessions going back to June 1967, while Miss Lee toured on the strength of the hit.

Six years would lapse before Mirrors was recorded, by which time Miss Lee had changed record labels. "Is That All There Is?" was not part of the original Mirrors LP; it was first added as a bonus track for the 1989 A&M CD reissue.

All the tracks from Mirrors, including two previously unreleased outtakes, were remixed and included in the limited edition CD, Peggy Lee Sings Leiber & Stoller (Hip-O Select, 2005.)

"Is That All There Is?" was arranged and conducted by Randy Newman. "Ready to Begin Again (Manya's Song)" was arranged and conducted by Perry Botkin, Jr.
