= Selections from Irving Berlin's White Christmas =

White Christmas

Studio album by Bing Crosby
- Released: 1954
- Recorded: April 10 and May 4, 1954
- Genre: Vocal
- Label: Decca
- Producer: Joseph Lilley

Bing Crosby chronology
Bing Sings the Hits (1954)	White Christmas (1954)	Bing: A Musical Autobiography (1954)

Professional ratings
Review scores
Source	Rating
Allmusic	4/5 stars

Selections from Irving Berlin's White Christmas is a 1954 album with songs from the musical film White Christmas. Among the featured artists are Bing Crosby, Danny Kaye, and Trudy Stevens (who dubbed for Vera-Ellen in the movie), with Peggy Lee, who was not in the movie, singing some parts (to substitute for Rosemary Clooney, who was contractually unavailable). It is one of the last 78 rpm albums produced by the Decca label.

== Background ==
For decades, an original soundtrack recording was never released. This was because Crosby had a recording contract with Decca Records and Rosemary Clooney was signed with Columbia Records and contractually could not record together. This album was issued with Columbia's Irving Berlin's White Christmas. In this album, Lee recorded the parts that Clooney sang in the movie. This was Crosby's third Decca LP album, recorded and released in 1954 and advertised as the soundtrack for White Christmas.

For the 78 rpm set, the three-song medley "Blue Skies/I'd Rather See a Minstrel Show/Mandy" running to 3 minutes 53 seconds was too long for a 10-inch 78, so "Blue Skies" was removed.

The music and lyrics were written by highly celebrated songwriter Irving Berlin. The album was released on CD by MCA in 1994. In the UK, it was released in 2002 as part of a 2-on-1 CD with studio recordings of songs from Holiday Inn (1942). A special edition, combined with the DVD of the film, was sold in Starbucks stores during the holiday season in 2006.

Although Clooney and Crosby were unable to make an album together at this time, they made the albums Fancy Meeting You Here, How the West Was Won, and That Travelin' Two-Beat later in their careers. They also co-starred in a network radio show and frequently appeared together on television during the 1950s and 1960s.

Many reissues of the song "Sisters" incorrectly attribute the performance to both Lee and Stevens when both parts are sung by Lee using overdubbing.

Variety said, "Another sock talent parlay adds up to another click pic score package."

An original soundtrack recording, containing the actual film performances, was finally released in 2022 on the Sepia label, as part of a two disc set which also contained original soundtrack recordings from Holiday Inn.

== Track listing ==
All tracks are written by Irving Berlin.

No.	Title	Performed by	Length
1.	"The Old Man" / "Gee I Wish I Was Back in the Army"	Bing Crosby and Danny Kaye with Orchestra and Chorus	2:48
2.	"Sisters"	Peggy Lee with Orchestra and Chorus	2:26
3.	"The Best Things Happen While You're Dancing"	Danny Kaye with The Skylarks, Orchestra and Chorus	2:34
4.	"Snow"	Bing Crosby, Danny Kaye, Peggy Lee, Trudy Stevens with Orchestra and Chorus	2:40
5.	"Blue Skies" / " I'd Rather See a Minstrel Show / Mandy"	Bing Crosby and Danny Kaye with Orchestra and Chorus	3:50
6.	"Choreography"	Danny Kaye with The Skylarks and Orchestra	2:41
7.	"Count Your Blessings Instead of Sheep"	Bing Crosby with Orchestra	3:04
8.	"Love, You Didn't Do Right by Me"	Peggy Lee with Orchestra	3:00
9.	"What Can You Do with a General?"	Bing Crosby with Orchestra	2:55
10.	"White Christmas" (finale)	Bing Crosby, Danny Kaye, Peggy Lee, Trudy Stevens with Orchestra and Chorus	3:17

== Personnel ==
- Bing Crosby – vocals
- Danny Kaye – vocals
- Peggy Lee – vocals
- Trudy Stevens – vocals
- The Skylarks – vocals
- Joseph Lilley – arranger, conductor
