= In the Name of Love (Peggy Lee album) =

1964 studio album by Peggy Lee

Studio album by Peggy Lee
- Released: September 1964
- Recorded: June 26; July 1, 2 and 6, 1964
- Genre: Vocal jazz, easy listening
- Length: 29:04
- Label: Capitol
- Producer: Dave Cavanaugh

Peggy Lee chronology
In Love Again! (1964)	In the Name of Love (1964)	Pass Me By (1965)

Professional ratings
Review scores
Source	Rating
Allmusic	3/5 stars
Billboard	Highly recommended
JazzTimes	Highly recommended

In the Name of Love is a 1964 studio album by Peggy Lee arranged by Billy May, Dave Grusin, and Lalo Schifrin. The small group tracks of the album are under the musical direction of pianist Lou Levy. Released September, 1964, the album spent six weeks in the Billboard charts, and peaked at No. 97. From this album, Lee's version of the song In The Name Of Love made an appearance in Billboard's "Bubbling Under The Hot 100" chart in the No. 132 position.

== Track listing ==
1. "In the Name of Love" (Estelle Levitt, Kenny Rankin) - 2:03
2. "My Sin" (Buddy De Sylva, Lew Brown, Ray Henderson) - 2:17
3. "The Boy from Ipanema" (Antônio Carlos Jobim, Norman Gimbel, Vinicius De Moraes) – 2:21
4. "Shangri-La" (Matty Malneck, Robert Maxwell, Carl Sigman) – 2:30
5. "Talk to Me Baby" (Robert E. Dolan, Johnny Mercer) – 2:46
6. "There'll Be Some Changes Made" (Benton Overstreet, Billy Higgins) – 2:07
7. "After You've Gone" (Turner Layton, Henry Creamer) - 2:24
8. "The Right to Love (Reflections)" (Gene Lees, Lalo Schifrin) - 2:54
9. "Theme from "Joy House" (Just Call Me Love Bird) (Lalo Schifrin, Peggy Lee) - 2:09
10. "Senza Fine" (Alec Wilder, Gino Paoli) - 2:28
11. "When in Rome (I Do as the Romans Do)" (Cy Coleman, Carolyn Leigh) - 2:01

== Personnel ==
=== Recording sessions ===
In The Name Of Love album sessions, Capitol Tower, 1750 North Vine St., Hollywood, CA

- Peggy Lee – Leader, singer
- Dave Cavanaugh - Producer

==== Arrangers ====
- Lou Levy (Head arrangements) – After You've Gone, My Sin, In The Name Of Love, There'll Be Some Changes Made, Senza Fine
- Dave Grusin – When In Rome, Shangri-La, Talk To Me Baby
- Billy May – The Boy From Ipanema
- Lalo Schifrin – The Right To Love (Reflections), Just Call Me Love Bird

==== June 26, 1964 ====
titles recorded: After You've Gone, My Sin, In The Name Of Love

- Joe Polio – Engineer
- Bob Bain, John Pisano, Howard Roberts – Guitar
- Chuck Berghofer – Bass guitar
- Lou Levy – Piano, arranger, leader
- Stan Levey – Drums
- Francisco Aguabella – Bongos, congas

==== July 1, 1964 ====
titles recorded: Talk To Me, Baby, When In Rome (I Do As The Romans Do), The Girl From Ipanema

- Hugh Davies – Engineer
- Billy May - Conductor, arranger
- Justin Gordon, Paul Horn, Ted Nash, Maury Stein – Saxophones, woodwinds
- Conrad Gozzo, Mannie Klein, Ray Triscari – Trumpets
- Milt Bernhart, Ed Kusby, Kenny Shroyer – Trombones
- Jim Decker – French Horn
- John Pisano – Guitar
- Chuck Berghofer – Bass guitar
- Lou Levy – Piano
- Stan Levey – Drums
- Francisco Aguabella – Bongos/Congas

==== July 2, 1964 ====
titles recorded: Shangri-La, The Right To Love (Reflections)

- Hugh Davies – Engineer
- Jules Jacob – Woodwinds/recorder
- Justin Gordon, Paul Horn – Woodwinds
- Milt Bernhart, Ed Kusby – Trombones
- Jim Decker – French Horn
- John Pisano – Guitar
- Chuck Berghofer – Bass guitar
- Lou Levy – Piano
- Stan Levey – Drums
- Francisco Aguabella – Bongos/Congas

==== July 6, 1964 ====
titles recorded: There'll Be Some Changes Made, Just Call Me Love Bird, Senza Fine

- Joe Polio – Engineer
- Justin Gordon, Paul Horn – Saxophones, woodwinds
- Bob Bain, John Pisano, Howard Roberts – Guitar
- Chuck Berghofer – Bass guitar
- Lou Levy – Piano
- Stan Levey – Drums
- Francisco Aguabella – Bongos/Congas
