= Then Was Then – Now Is Now! =

Studio album by Peggy Lee
- Released: December 1965
- Genre: Jazz
- Length: 26:05
- Label: Capitol
- Producer: Dave Cavanaugh

Peggy Lee chronology
Pass Me By (1965)	Then Was Then – Now Is Now! (1965)	Guitars a là Lee (1966)

Singles from Then Was Then – Now Is Now!
- 1. "I Go to Sleep" Released: August 1965

Professional ratings
Review scores
Source	Rating
Allmusic	3/5 stars

Then Was Then – Now Is Now! is a 1965 album by Peggy Lee.

== Track listing ==
1. "Trapped (In the Web of Love)" (Jeanne Burns) - 2:07
2. "Losers Weepers" from the motion picture Marriage on the Rocks (Bert Kaempfert, Charles Singleton, Eddie Snyder) - 2:29
3. "Free Spirits" (Norman Mapp) - 1:53
4. "I Go to Sleep" (Ray Davies) - 1:59
5. "Leave It To Love" (Lee Burke, Irving Szathmary) - 2:04
6. "The Shadow Of Your Smile" Love theme from The Sandpiper (Johnny Mandel, Paul Francis Webster) - 2:23
7. "They Say" (Dick Hyman, David Mann, George David Weiss) - 2:30
8. "Seventh Son" (Willie Dixon) - 2:23
9. "Then Was Then (And Now Is Now)" (Cy Coleman, Peggy Lee) - 2:24
10. "Ev'rybody Has the Right to Be Wrong (At Least Once)" from the Broadway musical Skyscraper (Jimmy Van Heusen, Sammy Cahn) - 1:52
11. "(I'm Afraid) The Masquerade Is Over" (Allie Wrubel, Herb Magidson) - 4:01

== Personnel ==
- Peggy Lee - vocals
- Sid Feller - arranger and conductor
