= Bridge over Troubled Water (Peggy Lee album) =

Bridge Over Troubled Water

Studio album by Peggy Lee
- Released: April 1970
- Recorded: 1970
- Genre: Jazz
- Length: 35:25
- Label: Capitol
- Producer: Phil Wright

Peggy Lee chronology
Is That All There Is? (1969)	Bridge Over Troubled Water (1970)	Make It with You (1970)

Professional ratings
Review scores
Source	Rating
AllMusic	unrated
Billboard	unrated

Bridge Over Troubled Water is a 1970 album by Peggy Lee.

== Chart performance ==
The album debuted on Billboard magazine's Top LP's chart in the issue dated June 6, 1970, peaking at No. 142 during a nine-week run on the chart.

== Reception ==
Lindsay Planer on AllMusic stated that "Overwhelmingly better suited to the artist are the show tunes 'You'll Remember Me,' with which Lee scored an easy listening chart hit; the closer, 'What Are You Doing the Rest of Your Life,' and the solitary selection from the Great White Way, 'I See Your Face Before Me.' Unquestionably it is the dark, ominous, and appropriately titled "Something Strange" that stands as Lee's signature tune from this effort."

Bridge over Troubled Water was a Billboard "Pop Pick", with the magazine saying "The unique performer tops herself again with this dynamite, commercial package destined for a big chart item." Adding that "Her superb reading of 'Bridge Over Troubled Water' is in a class by itself."

== Track listing ==
1. "You'll Remember Me" (Stan Worth, Arthur Hamilton) – 3:15
2. "Bridge Over Troubled Water" (Paul Simon) – 5:05
3. "The Thrill Is Gone" (Roy Hawkins, Rick Darnell) – 3:33
4. "Something Strange" (James Fagas) – 3:23
5. "Have You Seen My Baby" (Randy Newman) – 2:42
6. "He Used Me" (Jim Weatherly) – 3:48
7. "(There's) Always Something There to Remind Me" (Burt Bacharach, Hal David) – 2:42
8. "I See Your Face Before Me" (Arthur Schwartz, Howard Dietz) – 4:01
9. "Raindrops Keep Fallin' on My Head" (Bacharach, David) – 3:50
10. "What Are You Doing the Rest of Your Life?" (Alan and Marilyn Bergman, Michel Legrand) – 3:06

== Charts ==
Chart (1970)	Peak position
US Billboard Top LPs	142

== Personnel ==
- Peggy Lee – vocals, guitar
