= Golden Earrings (song) =

Single by Peggy Lee
- B-side: "I'll Dance at Your Wedding"
- Released: 1947
- Label: Capitol
- Composer: Victor Young
- Lyricists: Ray Evans, Jay Livingston

Music video
- "Golden Earrings" on YouTube

"Golden Earrings" is a song composed by Victor Young, with lyrics by Ray Evans and Jay Livingston, and introduced by Murvyn Vye in the 1947 Paramount film Golden Earrings.

It was a hit on the both sides of Atlantic as recorded by Peggy Lee.

== Composition ==
Reviewing Dinah Shore's version in October 1947, Billboard described "Golden Earrings" as a "dreamy gypsy melody".

As Philip Furia notes in his book American Song Lyricists, 1920-1960, "the melody of [the song]", "cast in the minor mode, and with altered second and seventh scale degrees", "has all the stereotypical markers of one intended to sound 'Jewish,' 'oriental,' or otherwise non-Western."
