= Sugar 'n' Spice (Peggy Lee album) =

Studio album by Peggy Lee
- Released: August 1962
- Recorded: March 28 – April 4, 1962
- Studio: Capitol Studios, Los Angeles
- Genre: Jazz
- Length: 38:46 (CD Reissue)
- Label: Capitol
- Producer: Dave Cavanaugh

Peggy Lee chronology
Bewitching-Lee (1961)	Sugar 'n' Spice (1962)	Mink Jazz (1962)

Original LP Rear cover

Alternative cover
- CD / re-issue cover

Professional ratings
Review scores
Source	Rating
Allmusic	3/5 stars

Sugar 'n' Spice is a 1962 album by Peggy Lee. The orchestra was conducted by Benny Carter.

== Track listing ==
1. "Ain't That Love" (Ray Charles) – 1:59
2. "The Best is Yet to Come" (Cy Coleman, Carolyn Leigh) – 3:19
3. "I Believe in You" from the Broadway Production How to Succeed in Business Without Really Trying (Frank Loesser) – 2:45
4. "Embrasse-Moi" (Peggy Lee, D'Aime Barelli) – 3:23
5. "See See Rider" (Ma Rainey) – 2:34
6. "Teach Me Tonight" (Sammy Cahn, Gene De Paul) – 2:22
7. "When the Sun Comes Out" (Harold Arlen, Ted Koehler) – 2:46
8. "Tell All the World About You" (Ray Charles) – 2:30
9. "I Don't Wanna Leave You Now" (Lee, Richard Hazard, Jeanne Taylor) – 2:21
10. "The Sweetest Sounds" from the Broadway Production No Strings (Richard Rodgers) – 1:50
11. "I've Got the World on a String" (Harold Arlen, Ted Koehler) – 2:20
12. "Big Bad Bill (Is Sweet William Now)" (Milton Ager, Jack Yellen) – 2:37

bonus tracks added to re-issue:

13. "I'll Be Around" (Alec Wilder) – 2:44
14. "Loads of Love" (Richard Rodgers) – 2:21
15. "Amazing" (Norman Gimbel, Emil Stern) – 2:35
