= Pass Me By (album) =

Studio album by Peggy Lee
- Released: April 1965
- Recorded: 1965
- Genres: Vocal jazz, traditional pop
- Length: 24:35
- Label: Capitol
- Producer: Dan O'Leary

Peggy Lee chronology
In the Name of Love (1964)	Pass Me By (1965)	Then Was Then - Now Is Now! (1965)

Professional ratings
Review scores
Source	Rating
Allmusic	2/5 stars

Pass Me By is a 1965 studio album by American singer Peggy Lee released by Capitol Records.

== Chart performance ==
The album debuted on Billboard magazine's Top LP's chart in the issue dated May 22, 1965, peaking at No. 145 during a four-week run on the chart.

The namesake single debuted on the Billboard Hot 100 in the issue dated February 27, 1965, reaching No. 93 during a three-week stay on it. At the same time it appeared on the Billboard Easy Listening chart, being ranked much higher at No. 19.

== Track listing ==
1. "Sneakin' Up on You" (Ted Daryll, Chip Taylor) - 2:21
2. "Pass Me By" (Cy Coleman, Carolyn Leigh) - 2:23
3. "I Wanna Be Around" (Sadie Vimmerstedt, Johnny Mercer) - 2:26
4. "Bewitched" (Howard Greenfield, Jack Keller) - 2:06
5. "My Love, Forgive Me (Amore, Scusami)" (Gino Mescoli, Vito Pallavicini) - 2:31
6. "You Always Hurt the One You Love" (Doris Fisher, Allan Roberts) - 1:43
7. "A Hard Day's Night" (John Lennon, Paul McCartney) - 2:04
8. "L-O-V-E" (Bert Kaempfert, Milt Gabler) - 2:04
9. "Dear Heart" (Jay Livingston, Ray Evans, Henry Mancini) - 2:19
10. "Quiet Nights of Quiet Stars" (Antônio Carlos Jobim, Gene Lees) - 2:21
11. "That's What It Takes" (Peggy Lee, Cy Coleman, Bill Schluger) - 2:17

== Personnel ==
- Peggy Lee – vocal
- Lou Levy – piano, arranger
- Bill Pitman, Bob Bain, Dennis Budimir, John Pisano - guitar
- Bob Whitlock - bass
- John Guerin - drums
- Francisco Aguabella - Latin percussion
- Dave Grusin - big band arrangement on "Pass Me By"
- Shorty Rogers - big band arrangement on "That's What It Takes"

== Charts ==
=== Album ===
Chart (1965)	Peak position
US Billboard Top LPs	145

=== Singles ===
Year	Single	Chart	Peak position
1965	"Pass Me By"	US Billboard Hot 100	93
1965	"Pass Me By"	US Easy Listening	19
