= Guitars a là Lee =

Studio album by Peggy Lee
- Released: August 1966
- Recorded: July 1966
- Genre: Vocal jazz, traditional pop
- Length: 31:14
- Label: Capitol
- Producer: Dave Cavanaugh

Peggy Lee chronology
Then Was Then - Now Is Now! (1965)	Guitars a là Lee (1966)	Big $pender (1966)

Professional ratings
Review scores
Source	Rating
Allmusic	3/5 stars

Guitars a là Lee is a 1966 album by the American singer Peggy Lee.

== Track listing ==
1. "Nice 'n' Easy" (Alan Bergman, Marilyn Keith, Lew Spence) - 3:08
2. "Strangers in the Night" (Bert Kaempfert, Charles Singleton, Eddie Snyder) - 2:28
3. "Mohair Sam" (Dallas Frazier) - 2:10
4. "Goodbye, My Love" (Peggy Lee, Victor Young) - 2:56
5. "Think Beautiful" (Jack Lawrence, Stan Freeman) - 2:27
6. "An Empty Glass" (Luiz Bonfá, Dick Manning) - 2:50
7. "Good Times" (Hugo, George David Weiss) - 2:36
8. "Sweet Happy Life" (Antonio Maria, Luiz Bonfá, Norman Gimbel) - 2:09
9. "Touch the Earth" (Jeri Southern, Gail Allen) - 2:30
10. "Beautiful, Beautiful World" (Sheldon Harnick, Jerry Bock) - 2:37
11. "My Guitar" (Peggy Lee) - 2:49
12. "Call Me" (Tony Hatch) - 2:34
