= Somethin' Groovy! =

Studio album by Peggy Lee
- Released: September 1967
- Recorded: June 1967
- Genre: Vocal jazz
- Length: 30:42
- Label: Capitol
- Producer: Dave Cavanaugh

Peggy Lee chronology
Extra Special! (1967)	Somethin' Groovy! (1967)	2 Shows Nightly (1968)

Professional ratings
Review scores
Source	Rating
AllMusic	2/5 stars

Somethin' Groovy! is a 1967 studio album by Peggy Lee. It was released in 1967 on Capitol Records. It was arranged by Ralph Carmichael and Toots Thielemans is credited for harmonica.

== Track listing ==
1. "Somethin' Stupid" (Carson Parks) - 2:31
2. "Makin' Whoopee" (Walter Donaldson, Gus Kahn) - 4:20
3. "You Must Have Been a Beautiful Baby" (Johnny Mercer, Harry Warren) - 1:52
4. "I Can Hear the Music" (Spence Maxwell, Gene DiNovi) - 1:54
5. "It Might as Well Be Spring" (Richard Rodgers, Oscar Hammerstein II) - 1:48
6. "Two for the Road" (Henry Mancini, Leslie Bricusse) - 2:47
7. "Release Me" (Eddie Miller, Robert Yount, Dub Williams) - 2:54
8. "Sing a Rainbow" (Arthur Hamilton) - 2:25
9. "No Fool Like an Old Fool" (Joseph McCarthy, Joseph Meyer) - 4:43
10. "Our Love Is Here to Stay" (George Gershwin, Ira Gershwin) - 2:46
11. "I'm Gonna Get It" (Peggy Lee, Georghe Romanis) - 2:42
