= The Peggy Lee Songbook: There'll Be Another Spring =

Studio album by Peggy Lee
- Released: 1990
- Recorded: November 1–3, 1989
- Studio: BMG Recording New York
- Genre: Vocal jazz
- Length: 47:49
- Label: Musicmasters
- Producer: John Chiodini, John Snyder, Peggy Lee

Peggy Lee chronology
Love Held Lightly: Rare Songs by Harold Arlen (1989)	The Peggy Lee Songbook: There'll Be Another Spring (1990)	Moments Like This (1993)

Professional ratings
Review scores
Source	Rating
Allmusic	3/5 stars

The Peggy Lee Songbook: There'll Be Another Spring is a 1989 studio album by Peggy Lee.

== Track listing ==
1. "Circle in the Sky" (Peggy Lee, Emil Palame) 2:58
2. "I Just Want to Dance All Night" (Lee, John Chiodini) 4:01
3. "He's a Tramp" (Lee, Sonny Burke) 2:34
4. "There'll Be Another Spring" (Lee, Hubie Wheeler) 4:19
5. "Johnny Guitar" (Lee, Victor Young) 5:22
6. "Fever" (Eddie Cooley, John Davenport) 3:24
7. "I'll Give It All to You" (Lee, Chiodini) 2:34
8. "Sans Souci" (Burke, Lee) 3:10
9. "Where Can I Go Without You?" (Lee) 4:53
10. "Boomerang (I'll Come Back to You)" (Lee, Chiodini) 3:30
11. "Things Are Swingin'" (Lee, Jack Marshall) 2:31
12. "Over the Wheel" (Lee, Chiodini) 3:30
13. "The Shining Sea" (Lee, Johnny Mandel) 2:34
