= Norma Deloris Egstrom from Jamestown, North Dakota =

Studio album by Peggy Lee
- Released: June 1972
- Recorded: April 24, 27 & 28, 1972
- Genre: Pop
- Length: 32:51
- Label: Capitol
- Producer: Tom Catalano

Peggy Lee chronology
Where Did They Go (1971)	Norma Deloris Egstrom from Jamestown, North Dakota (1972)	Let's Love (1974)

Norma Deloris Egstrom from Jamestown, North Dakota is a 1972 album by Peggy Lee. It was her final album for Capitol Records, her label since 1957 and, prior to that, from 1944 to 1952.

Peggy Lee's stage name does not appear on the cover of this album. Its title refers to her given name and her birthplace.

== Recording history ==
The recording sessions for this album took place in Los Angeles.

During the sessions for this album, Lee also recorded the song "It Changes," which was written by Robert and Richard Sherman for the 1972 Peanuts film Snoopy Come Home. "It Changes" was left off the original 1972 LP, but added to a 2004 U.K. compact disc reissue of the album by EMI.

After finishing Norma Deloris Egstrom, Lee did not make any studio recordings until two years later, when she recorded "Let's Love" (written for her by Paul McCartney) for Atlantic Records in April 1974.

== Reception ==
Capitol Records released "Love Song" (backed by "Someone Who Cares") as a 45" single in 1972. It was a minor hit, spending four weeks on the Billboard Easy Listening chart and peaking at #34 in October 1972. It was also Lee's last single for Capitol, nearly three decades after she released her first on the label.

The album received a modestly positive review in Stereo Review in October 1973. The reviewer, Peter Reilly, wrote: "By the standards Peggy Lee herself has set (no others can take her measure), the new album isn’t particularly outstanding. But, as always, there are three or four stunning bands – 'I’ll Be Seeing You,' 'I’ll Get By' and 'Someone Who Cares' here – that reach the highest level of her accomplishments, and that is high indeed."

To the ire of Lee's fans, the 2004 EMI CD reissue of this album contains a number of alternate takes that are not identified as such on the packaging. In 2022, Capitol Records and Universal Music Enterprises reissued the album in CD and digital formats with all of its master takes plus, as bonus tracks, five alternate takes, one outtake from the album sessions ("It Changes"), and a non-album single from the same era ("Pieces of Dreams").

== Track listing ==
1. "Love Song" (Lesley Duncan) - 3:22
2. "Razor (Love Me as I Am)" (Jack Schechtman) - 2:49
3. "When I Found You" (Mike Randall) -3:23
4. "A Song for You" (Leon Russell) - 4:44
5. "It Takes Too Long to Learn to Live Alone" (Leon Carr, Robert Allen) - 3:25
6. "Superstar" (Bonnie Bramlett, Delaney Bramlett, Leon Russell) - 3:57
7. "Just for a Thrill" (Don Raye, Louis Armstrong) - 3:23
8. "Someone Who Cares" (Alex Harvey) - 3:23
9. "The More I See You" (Mack Gordon, Harry Warren) - 1:55
10. "I'll Be Seeing You" (Sammy Fain, Irving Kahal) - 2:15
