= Live in London (Peggy Lee album) =

Live album by Peggy Lee
- Released: 1977
- Recorded: March 13, 1977
- Genre: Vocal jazz
- Length: 42:57
- Label: Polydor Records

Peggy Lee chronology
Mirrors (1975)	Live in London (1977)	Peggy (1977)

Live in London is a 1977 live album by Peggy Lee, recorded at the London Palladium.

Record producer Ken Barnes and Peggy Lee signed a contract with Polydor Records for two albums, one in the studio and one "live". The studio album was Peggy and this was the live album and it was taken from the two performances at the London Palladium on March 13, 1977.

== Track listing ==
1. "Love for Sale" (Cole Porter) - 2:44
2. "Everything Must Change" (Benard Ighner) - 3:58
3. "You Gotta Know How" (Beulah "Sippie" Wallace) - 3:00
4. "The Folks Who Live On the Hill" (Jerome Kern, Oscar Hammerstein II) - 3:40
5. "I Don't Want to Play in Your Yard" (Henry W. Petrie, Philip Wingate, Henry Sawyer) - 1:18
6. "Have a Good Time" (Paul Simon) - 2:15
7. "Touch Me in the Morning" (Ronald Norman Miller, Michael Masser) - 3:55
8. "Make Believe" (Kern, Hammerstein) - 3:16
9. "Fever" (Jack Davenport, Eddie Cooley, Peggy Lee) - 2:25
10. "Why Don't You Do Right?" (Kansas Joe McCoy) - 1:22
11. "Is That All There Is?" (Jerry Leiber and Mike Stoller) - 3:50
12. "Sing a Rainbow" (Arthur Hamilton) - 1:40
13. "Mr. Wonderful" (Jerry Bock, Larry Holofcener, George David Weiss) - 3:37
14. "Mack the Knife" (Kurt Weill, Bertolt Brecht, Marc Blitzstein) - 3:05
15. "Dreams of Summer" (Utaka Kokakura, Lee) - 3:35
16. "Here's to You" (Richard Hazard, Lee) - 2:46

== Personnel ==
Peggy Lee (ldr), Ken Barnes (pdr), Steve Taylor (eng), Peter Moore, Jack Parnell (con), The Jack Parnell Orchestra (acc), Bob Burns (as), Duncan Lamont, Tommy Whittle (ts), Kenny Baker (t), Richard Edwards, Don Lusher (tb), Tony Fisher (fh), Judd Proctor (g), Unknown (str), Ronnie Price (key), Ronnie Verrell (d), Peggy Lee (v)
