= Miss Peggy Lee Sings the Blues =

Studio album by Peggy Lee
- Released: 1988
- Recorded: February 1988
- Genre: Jazz
- Length: 47:49
- Label: Musicmasters Records
- Producer: Gregory K. Squires

Peggy Lee chronology
Close Enough for Love (1979)	Miss Peggy Lee Sings the Blues (1988)	Love Held Lightly: Rare Songs by Harold Arlen (1988)

Miss Peggy Lee Sings the Blues is a 1988 studio album by jazz singer Peggy Lee. This was Lee's first album for nine years, and the first of two albums that she recorded for the Musicmasters label.

== Reception ==
Professional ratings
Review scores
Source	Rating
Allmusic	3/5 stars

Scott Yanow reviewed the album for AllMusic and wrote that "By 1988, 68-year-old Peggy Lee did not have much of a voice left. Although she was still determined, physical problems had weakened her, and despite Gene Lees' absurd raving in the liner notes ("Her work has never flagged, the quality of it has never faltered"), this set finds her way past her prime." Yanow described the material as "pretty strong" and praised the quintet that supported Lee on the album, and concluded his review by writing that "This is one of the better releases from Peggy Lee's later years, but it still pales next to her 1950s recordings."

== Track listing ==
1. "See See Rider" (Ma Rainey, Traditional) – 5:06
2. "Basin Street Blues" (Clarence Williams) – 3:10
3. "Squeeze Me" (Fats Waller, Williams) – 2:47
4. "You Don't Know" (Walter Spriggs) – 4:09
5. "Fine and Mellow" (Billie Holiday) – 5:13
6. "Baby Won't You Please Come Home" (Charles Warfield, Williams) – 3:25
7. "Kansas City" (Leiber and Stoller) – 3:43
8. "Birmingham Jail" (Traditional) – 4:15
9. "Love Me" (Kansas Joe McCoy) – 4:10
10. "Beale Street Blues" (W. C. Handy) – 2:52
11. "'Tain't Nobody's Bizness If I Do" (Porter Grainger, Everett Robbins, Williams) – 5:45
12. "God Bless the Child" (Holiday, Arthur Herzog Jr.) – 3:14

== Personnel ==
- Peggy Lee – vocals
- Mike Renzi – piano
- John Chiodini – guitar
- Jay Leonhart – double bass
- Mark Sherman – percussion
- Grady Tate – drums
- Gregory K. Squires – producer
- Bill Kipper, Andrew Milano – engineer
