= Things Are Swingin' =

Studio album by Peggy Lee
- Released: 1959
- Recorded: May 19–30, 1958
- Studio: Hollywood, California
- Genre: Jazz
- Length: 33:27
- Label: Capitol
- Producer: Dave Cavanaugh

Peggy Lee chronology
Jump for Joy (1959)	Things Are Swingin' (1959)	Miss Wonderful (1959)

Singles from Things Are Swingin'
- 1. "Things Are Swingin'" Released: 1958

Professional ratings
Review scores
Source	Rating
AllMusic	3/5 stars

Things Are Swingin' is an album by singer Peggy Lee with music arranged and conducted by Jack Marshall.

== Track listing ==
1. "It's a Wonderful World" (Harold Adamson, Jan Savitt, Johnny Watson) – 2:14
2. "Things Are Swingin'" (Peggy Lee, Jack Marshall) – 2:12
3. "Alright, Okay, You Win" (Mayme Watts, Sidney Wyche) – 2:53
4. "Ridin' High" (Cole Porter) – 2:10
5. "It's Been a Long, Long Time" (Sammy Cahn, Jule Styne) – 2:19
6. "Lullaby in Rhythm" (Benny Goodman, Walter Hirsch, Clarence Profit, Edgar Sampson) – 2:16
7. "Alone Together" (Arthur Schwartz, Howard Dietz) – 2:07
8. "I'm Beginning to See the Light" (Duke Ellington, Don George, Johnny Hodges, Harry James) – 1:48
9. "It's a Good, Good Night" (Lee) – 1:56
10. "You're Getting to Be a Habit with Me" (Al Dubin, Harry Warren) – 2:42
11. "You're Mine, You" (Johnny Green, Edward Heyman) – 1:48
12. "Life Is for Livin'" (Cahn, Jimmy Van Heusen) – 3:13

The 2004 CD re-release includes the non-album single "Fever" and its B-side "You Don't Know" as bonus tracks.

== Personnel ==
- Peggy Lee – vocals
- Uan Rasey – trumpet
- Pete Candoli – trumpet
- Don Fagerquist – trumpet
- Conrad Gozzo – trumpet
- Mannie Klein – trumpet
- Milt Bernhart – trombone
- Bob Enevoldsen – valve trombone
- Justin Gordon – reeds
- Joe Harnell – piano
- Howard Roberts – guitar
- Barney Kessel – guitar
- Joe Mondragon – double bass
- Shelly Manne – drums
