= Extra Special! =

Compilation album by Peggy Lee
- Released: 1967
- Recorded: 1960–66
- Genre: Vocal jazz
- Length: 26:53
- Label: Capitol
- Producer: Dave Cavanaugh

Peggy Lee chronology
Big $pender (1966)	Extra Special! (1967)	Somethin' Groovy! (1967)

Professional ratings
Review scores
Source	Rating
Allmusic	3/5 stars

Extra Special! is a compilation album by Peggy Lee recorded between 1960 and 1966, with arrangers including (Quincy Jones, Ralph Carmichael, Bill Holman, and Johnny Mandel). Three songs that Lee co-wrote are featured.

== Track listing ==
1. "Hey, Look Me Over" (Cy Coleman, Carolyn Leigh) - 1:55
2. "When He Makes Music" (Jack Segal, Marvin Fisher) - 2:50
3. "Walking Happy" (Jimmy Van Heusen, Sammy Cahn) - 2:34
4. "Oh! You Crazy Moon" (Van Heusen, Johnny Burke) - 2:47
5. "So What's New?" (Peggy Lee, John Pisano) - 2:16
6. "Call Me Darling" (Dorothy Dick, Mort Fryberg, Rolf Marbet, Bert Reisfeld) - 2:37
7. "A Bucket of Tears" (Winfield Scott, Dorothy Goodman) - 2:17
8. "The Shining Sea" (Lee, Johnny Mandel) - 2:47
9. "A Doodlin' Song (Doop Doo-De Oop)" (Coleman, Leigh) - 2:06
10. "Amazing" (Norman Gimbel, Emil Stern) - 2:35
11. "I'm Gonna Go Fishin'" (Lee, Duke Ellington) - 2:09
