= Love Held Lightly: Rare Songs by Harold Arlen =

Studio album by Peggy Lee
- Released: 1993
- Recorded: August 29 – September 2, 1988
- Genre: Vocal jazz
- Length: 53:46
- Label: Capitol
- Producer: Bill Rudman, Keith Ingham, Ken Bloom

Peggy Lee chronology
Miss Peggy Lee Sings the Blues (1989)	Love Held Lightly: Rare Songs by Harold Arlen (1993)	The Peggy Lee Songbook: There'll Be Another Spring (1989)

Professional ratings
Review scores
Source	Rating
Allmusic	3/5 stars

Love Held Lightly: Rare Songs by Harold Arlen is an album by Peggy Lee that was recorded in 1988 but not released until 1993.

== Track listing ==
1. "Look Who's Been Dreaming" (Dorothy Fields) 2:40
2. "Love Held Lightly (from Saratoga)" (Johnny Mercer) 4:18
3. "Buds Won't Bud" (Yip Harburg) 3:30
4. "Can You Explain?" (Truman Capote) 3:39
5. "Wait'll It Happens to You" (Mercer) 2:31
6. "Come on, Midnight" (Martin Charnin) 4:38
7. "Happy with the Blues" (Peggy Lee) 4:25
8. "Bad for Each Other" (Carolyn Leigh) 3:27
9. "Love's No Stranger to Me" (Capote) 2:49
10. "I Could Be Good for You" (Charnin) 2:39
11. "Got to Wear You Off My Weary Mind" (Mercer) 4:13
12. "I Had a Love Once" (Harold Arlen) 2:44
13. "Love's a Necessary Thing" (Ted Koehler) 3:38
14. "My Shining Hour" (Mercer) 2:35

All songs composed by Harold Arlen, lyricists indicated.
