= Moments Like This (album) =

Studio album by Peggy Lee
- Released: 1993
- Recorded: September 8, 9, 1992
- Genre: Jazz
- Length: 53:46
- Label: Chesky

Peggy Lee chronology
The Peggy Lee Songbook: There'll Be Another Spring (1989)	Moments Like This (1993)

Professional ratings
Review scores
Source	Rating
Allmusic	2/5 stars

Moments Like This is a 1993 studio album by Peggy Lee, the last album that Lee recorded.

== Track listing ==
1. "I Don't Know Enough About You" (Dave Barbour, Peggy Lee) – 2:46
2. "I'm in Love Again" (Cy Coleman, Lee, Bill Schluger) – 4:33
3. "Why Don't You Do Right?" (Kansas Joe McCoy) – 3:36
4. "Remind Me" (Dorothy Fields, Jerome Kern) – 4:07
5. "Moments Like This" (Burton Lane, Frank Loesser) – 2:35
6. "Love Is Here to Stay" (George Gershwin, Ira Gershwin) – 4:21
7. "Don't Ever Leave Me" (Oscar Hammerstein II, Kern) – 3:20
8. "Mañana (Is Soon Enough for Me)" (Barbour, Lee) – 3:03
9. "The Folks Who Live On the Hill" (Hammerstein, Kern) – 3:53
10. "'S Wonderful" (G. Gershwin, I. Gershwin) – 3:22
11. "Amazing" (Norman Gimbel, Emil Stern) – 3:08
12. "Do I Love You?" (Cole Porter) – 3:45
13. "You're My Thrill" (Sidney Clare, Jay Gorney) – 4:13
14. "Always True to You in My Fashion" (Porter) – 2:56
15. "Then Was Then" (Cy Coleman, Lee) – 4:08
