= Peggy Lee =

American singer (1920–2002)

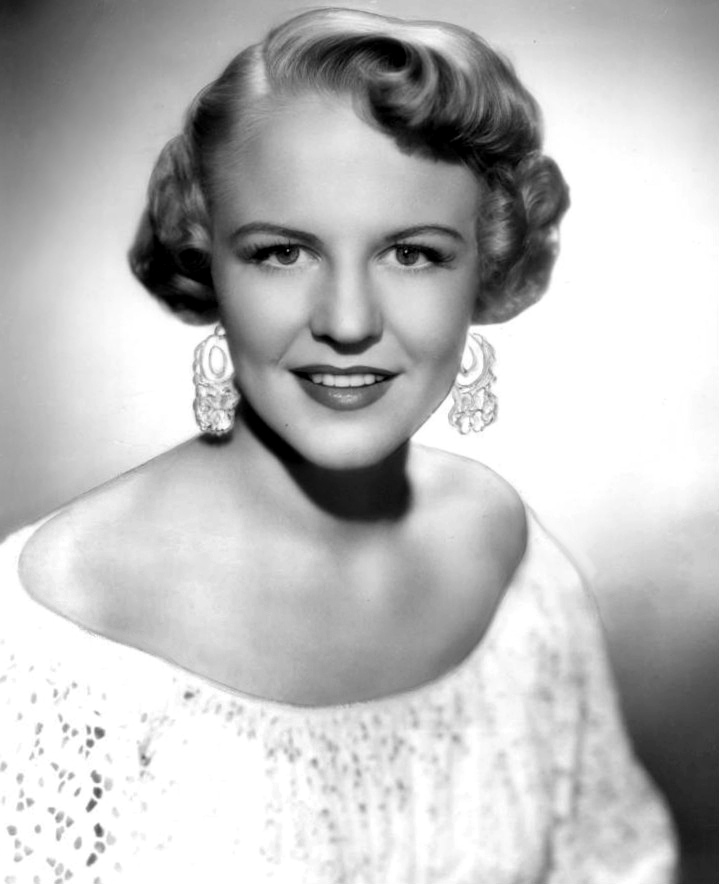
- Lee in 1950
- Born: Norma Deloris Egstrom; May 26, 1920; Jamestown, North Dakota, U.S.
- Died: January 21, 2002 (aged 81); Los Angeles, California, U.S.
- Resting place: Westwood Village Memorial Park Cemetery
- Occupations: Singer; songwriter; actress
- Known for: The Jazz Tree; Disney's Lady and the Tramp; Pete Kelly's Blues; The Jazz Singer
- Spouses: Dave Barbour (m. 1943; div. 1951); Brad Dexter (m. 1953; div. 1953); Dewey Martin (m. 1956; div. 1958); Jack Del Rio (m. 1964; div. 1964)
- Children: 1
- Musical career
- Origin: Valley City, Jamestown, Wimbledon, Fargo, North Dakota
- Genres: Jazz; Traditional pop; big band; swing; blues; Latin jazz
- Instrument: Vocals (Contralto)
- Works: Peggy Lee discography
- Years active: 1936–2000
- Labels: Capitol; Decca; Atlantic; A&M; Polydor; DRG Records; MusicMasters Records; Harbinger

Norma Deloris Egstrom (Note: Sources vary as to the spelling of Lee's birth surname. She specified it as "Egstrom" in her autobiography, a spelling accepted by sources such Britannica, the New York Times obituary, and the website peggylee.com maintained by her estate. However, other sources give the name as "Engstrom".) (May 26, 1920 – January 21, 2002), known professionally as Peggy Lee, was an American jazz and popular music singer, songwriter, and actress whose career spanned seven decades. From her beginning as a vocalist on local radio to singing with Benny Goodman's big band, Lee created a sophisticated persona, writing music for films, acting, and recording conceptual record albums combining poetry and music.

Her best known hits were recorded during her time at Capitol Records, including "Why Don't You Do Right?" (1943), "Fever" (1958), and "Is That All There Is?" (1969). The latter two songs earned her Grammy Awards. Towards her later recordings, Lee switched to complete vocal jazz with albums like Miss Peggy Lee Sings the Blues (1988).

Lee recorded more than 1,100 masters and co-wrote more than 270 songs. She is best known for her role in the Walt Disney classic Lady and the Tramp, where she voiced Darling, Peg, and the Siamese cats, among others. In 1956, she received an Academy Award nomination for her role in the 1955 film Pete Kelly's Blues. That same year, Lee was also nominated for a Primetime Emmy Award.

== Early life ==
Lee was born Norma Deloris Egstrom in Jamestown, North Dakota, United States, on May 26, 1920, the seventh of the eight children of Selma Emele (née Anderson) Egstrom and Marvin Olaf Egstrom, a station agent for the Midland Continental Railroad. Her family were Lutherans. Her father was Swedish-American and her mother was Norwegian-American. After her mother died when Lee was four, her father married Minnie Schaumberg Wiese. His family's original name was Ekström.

Lee and her family lived in several towns along the Midland Continental Railroad (Jamestown, Nortonville, and Wimbledon). She graduated from Wimbledon High School in 1937.

Lee began singing at a young age. In Wimbledon, she was the female singer for a six-piece college dance band with leader Lyle "Doc" Haines. She traveled to various locations with Haines's quintet on Fridays after school and on weekends. Lee first sang professionally on KOVC radio in Valley City, North Dakota, in 1936. She later had her own 15-minute Saturday radio show sponsored by a local restaurant that paid her in food. Both during and after her high-school years, Lee sang for small sums on local radio stations.

In October 1937, radio personality Ken Kennedy, of North Dakota's most widely heard station, WDAY in Fargo, auditioned her and put her on the air that day, but not before he changed her name to Peggy Lee.

In March 1938, at age 17, Lee left home for Hollywood, California. Her first job was as a short-order cook and waitress at Harry's Cafe on Balboa Island, Newport Beach. When the job ended after Easter, she was hired as a carnival barker at the Balboa Fun Zone. She wrote about this experience in the song "The Nickel Ride", which she composed with Dave Grusin for the 1974 film of the same name.

Later in 1938, Lee returned to Hollywood to audition for the MC at The Jade. Her employment was cut short when she fainted onstage due to overwork and malnutrition. After she was taken to the Hollywood Presbyterian Medical Center she was told she needed a tonsillectomy. Lee returned to North Dakota for the operation.

In 1939, Lee was hired to perform regularly at The Powers Hotel in Fargo, and toured with both the Sev Olson and the Will Osborne Orchestras. She was also again broadcasting at WDAY.

When Lee returned to California in 1940, she took a job singing at The Doll House in Palm Springs. There, she developed her trademark sultry purr, having decided to compete with the noisy crowd with subtlety rather than volume.

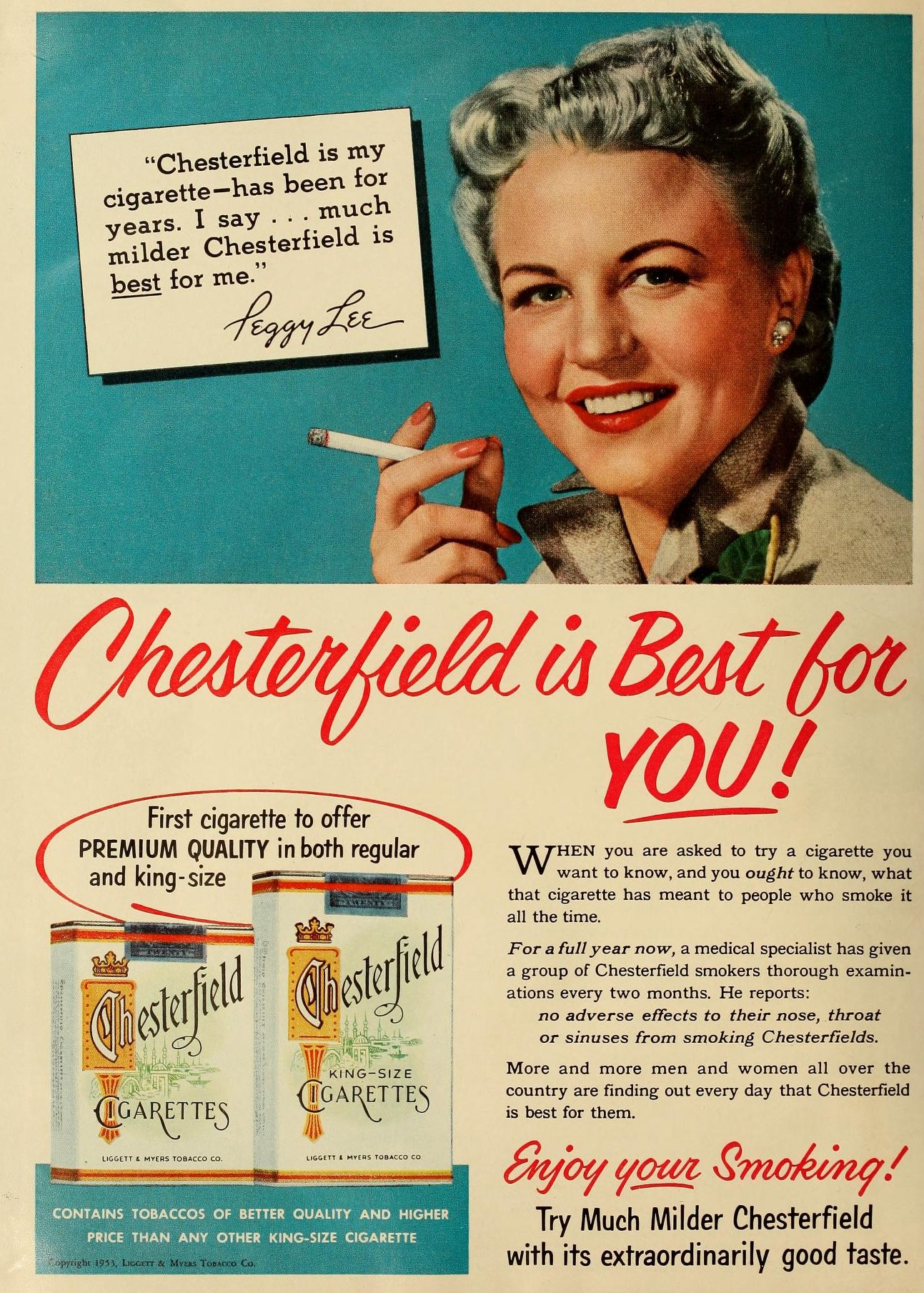
Lee, famous for her sultry singing voice, featured in a cigarette ad in 1953.

I knew I couldn't sing over them, so I decided to sing under them. The more noise they made, the more softly I sang. When they discovered they couldn't hear me, they began to look at me. Then, they began to listen. As I sang, I kept thinking, "softly with feeling". The noise dropped to a hum; the hum gave way to silence. I had learned how to reach and hold my audience—softly, with feeling.

While performing at The Doll House, Lee met Frank Bering, the owner of the Ambassador East and West in Chicago. He offered her a gig at the Buttery Room, a nightclub in the Ambassador Hotel West. There, she was noticed by bandleader Benny Goodman. According to Lee:

Benny's then-fiancée, Lady Alice Duckworth, came into the Buttery, and she was very impressed. So the next evening, she brought Benny in, because they were looking for a replacement for Helen Forrest. And although I didn't know, I was it. He was looking at me strangely, I thought, but it was just his preoccupied way of looking. I thought that he didn't like me at first, but it just was that he was preoccupied with what he was hearing.

== Career ==
=== Recording career ===
==== 1940–1951: Recordings with Benny Goodman and the early Capitol years ====
She joined Goodman's band in August 1941 and made her first recording, singing "Elmer's Tune". Lee stayed with the Benny Goodman Orchestra for two years.

On November 13, 1941, Lee recorded four songs: "Somebody Else Is Taking My Place", "Somebody Nobody Knows", "They Did It, Marie", and "How Long Has This Been Going On?." "Somebody Else Is Taking My Place" was soon released as a single and in 1942, Lee had her first top ten hit with it, followed in 1943 by "Why Don't You Do Right?", which sold more than one million copies and made her famous. She sang with Goodman's orchestra in two 1943 films, Stage Door Canteen and The Powers Girl.

In March 1943, Lee married Dave Barbour, a guitarist in Goodman's band. Lee said:

David joined Benny's band and there was a ruling that no one should fraternize with the girl singer. But I fell in love with David the first time I heard him play, and so I married him. Benny then fired David, so I quit, too. Benny and I made up, although David didn't play with him anymore. Benny stuck to his rule. I think that's not too bad a rule, but you can't help falling in love with somebody.

Will Friedwald has written:

when she left the band that spring [1943], her intention was to quit the footlights altogether and become Mrs. Barbour, fulltime housewife. It's to Mr. Barbour's credit that he refused to let his wife's singing and composing talent lie dormant for too long. "I fell in love with David Barbour," she recalled. "But 'Why Don't You Do Right' was such a giant hit that I kept getting offers and kept turning them down. And at that time it was a lot of money, but it really didn't matter to me at all. I was very happy. All I wanted was to have a family and cling to the children [daughter Nicki]. Well, they kept talking to me and finally David joined them and said 'You really have too much talent to stay at home and someday you might regret it.'"

In 1944, Lee drifted back to songwriting and occasional recording sessions for Capitol Records, for which she recorded a long string of hits, many of them with lyrics and music by Lee and Barbour, including "I Don't Know Enough About You" and "It's a Good Day". Her recording of "Golden Earrings", the title song of a 1947 movie, was a hit throughout 1947–48. "Mañana", by Lee and Barbour, was her eleventh solo hit recording, and remained on the charts for 21 weeks, including nine at the top position. The song sold more than a million copies, and earned the Top Disc Jockey Record of the Year award from Billboard magazine. From 1946 to 1949, Lee also recorded for Capitol's library of electrical transcriptions for radio stations. An advertisement for Capitol Transcriptions in a trade magazine noted that the transcriptions included "special voice introductions by Peggy".

In 1948, Lee joined vocalists Perry Como and Jo Stafford as a host of the NBC Radio musical program The Chesterfield Supper Club. She was a regular on The Jimmy Durante Show and appeared frequently on Bing Crosby's radio shows during the late 1940s and early 1950s.

==== 1952–1957: Time at Decca ====
1952 vinyl record of Lee's first Decca single "Be Anything (but Be Mine)"

Her relationship with Capitol spanned almost three decades, aside from a brief detour (1952–1957) at Decca. Decca signed Lee in early 1952. The single "Be Anything (but Be Mine)" was released in mid-spring 1952 arranged by Gordon Jenkins. The San Francisco Chronicle asssesed it as a "very good" starter single for Decca. In May 1952, the song made the charts and peaked at No. 21.

The following single was "Lover" written by Richard Rodgers and Lorenz Hart for the 1932 film Love Me Tonight. Lee's version was used in the film The Jazz Singer. Released in late May 1952, it sold over 250,00 copies in just the first few weeks and peaked at No. 3 on the pop charts, becoming her biggest Decca hit. For a single in the summer, Decca partnered up Lee and Bing Crosby to record "Watermelon Weather". The song became a hit in America, as well as Australia where it hit No. 15. She would appear on Crosby's radio show two times in June 1952, singing duets, including "Watermelon Weather". Two other singles followed, both making the US pop charts: "Just One of Those Things" and "River River". Lee would be absent from the pop charts from there on until "Baubles, Bangles, & Beads" in late 1953, which hit the US top-30 and Australian top-10. Later, "Mister Wonderful" also hit the charts. It was her first UK pop chart entry as well, peaking at No. 5.

In April-May 1953, she recorded Black Coffee, regarded as a concept album. The album missed the charts upon its release, but charted in the UK almost 10 years later at No. 20 after a rerelease in the country. It also made a short chart appearance in 2021 on the US Billboard Jazz Albums at No. 24. Joni Mitchell declared the album one of her favorites. Later that year, Decca released their first Peggy Lee compilation titled Songs in an Intimate Style. In 1954 and 1955, Lee recorded albums with other popular singers of the time. Notably, she substituted for Rosemary Clooney on Selections from Irving Berlin's White Christmas. The album almost topped the charts in 1954, peaking at No. 2. Songs from Pete Kelly's Blues (with Ella Fitzgerald) managed to reach No. 7 on the Billboard pop charts the following year. In 1955, during Lady and the Tramp's release, a film which starred her, Lee's recordings for "He's A Tramp" and "The Siamese Cat Song" were released as a single by Decca Records. In 1956, "Joey, Joey, Joey" was Lee's final Decca single to make the charts at No. 76.

In 1957, Lee's final album for Decca was released and titled Dream Street, also regarded as a concept album. Music critic Jason Ankeny believed it contained "the first truly adult music of her career." Her contract expired in February 1957. Though she started recording for Capitol by then again, Lee's final Decca single came in 1958 with "Johnny Guitar".

==== 1957–1973: Second Capitol phase ====
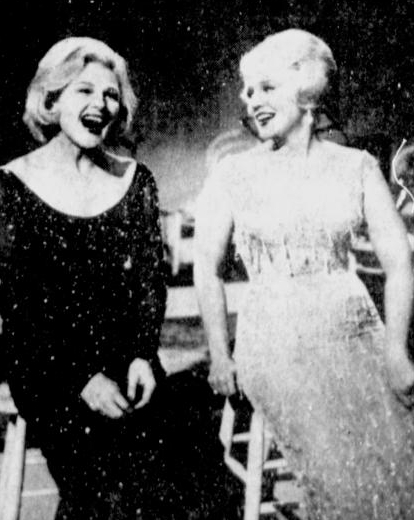
Jo Stafford and Lee on the Jo Stafford Show c. 1960s

In 1958, she recorded her own version of "Fever" by Little Willie John, written by Eddie Cooley and Otis Blackwell. Lee created a new arrangement for the song, and added lyrics ("Romeo loved Juliet", "Captain Smith and Pocahontas"), which she neglected to copyright. Her version of "Fever" was a hit and was nominated in three categories at the 1st Annual Grammy Awards in 1959, including Record of the Year and Song of the Year.

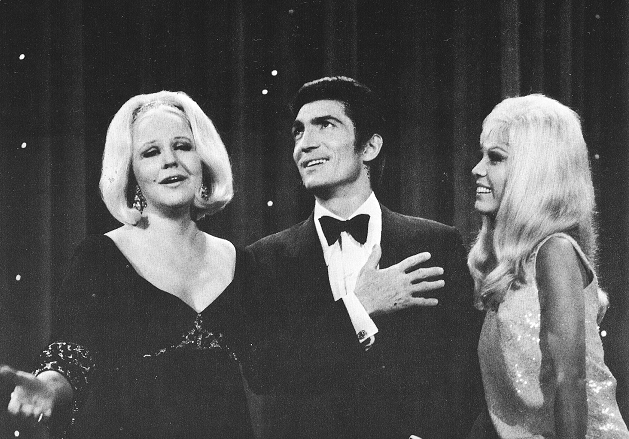
Peggy Lee, Sergio Franchi, and Nancy Sinatra on The Ed Sullivan Show in 1967

In 1969, she teamed up with Jerry Leiber and Mike Stoller for "Is That All There Is?". Produced and written by them, Lee's performance of the song won her the Grammy for Best Contemporary Vocal Performance. An album was soon assembled with the same name. Two singles were lifted from it, "Whistle for Happiness," which was her final Canadian singles chart appearance, and "Love Story," written by Randy Newman, which became her final pop hit.

Lee tried to return to the pop charts with a similar song to "Is That All There Is?" with "Where Did They Go", but the effort failed; it was her first single after the aforementioned hit to miss any chart. But an eponymous album did follow, released in mid 1971, it contained cover versions of pop hits by other artists.

==== 1974–2000: Later recordings and genre shift ====
While Lee was in London for a 1970 engagement at Royal Albert Hall, she invited Paul and Linda McCartney to dinner at The Dorchester. At the dinner, the couple gave Lee a song they had written, "Let's Love". In July 1974, with Paul McCartney producing, Lee recorded the song at the Record Plant in Los Angeles, and it became the title track of her 40th album, her only one on Atlantic Records.

Lee continued to record for different labels in the 1970s, Mirrors for A&M in 1975, Peggy for Polydor in 1977, and Close Enough for Love in 1979 for DRG.

She returned in the 1980s to record vocal jazz albums such as Miss Peggy Lee Sings the Blues and Love Held Lightly: Rare Songs by Harold Arlen.

=== Acting career ===
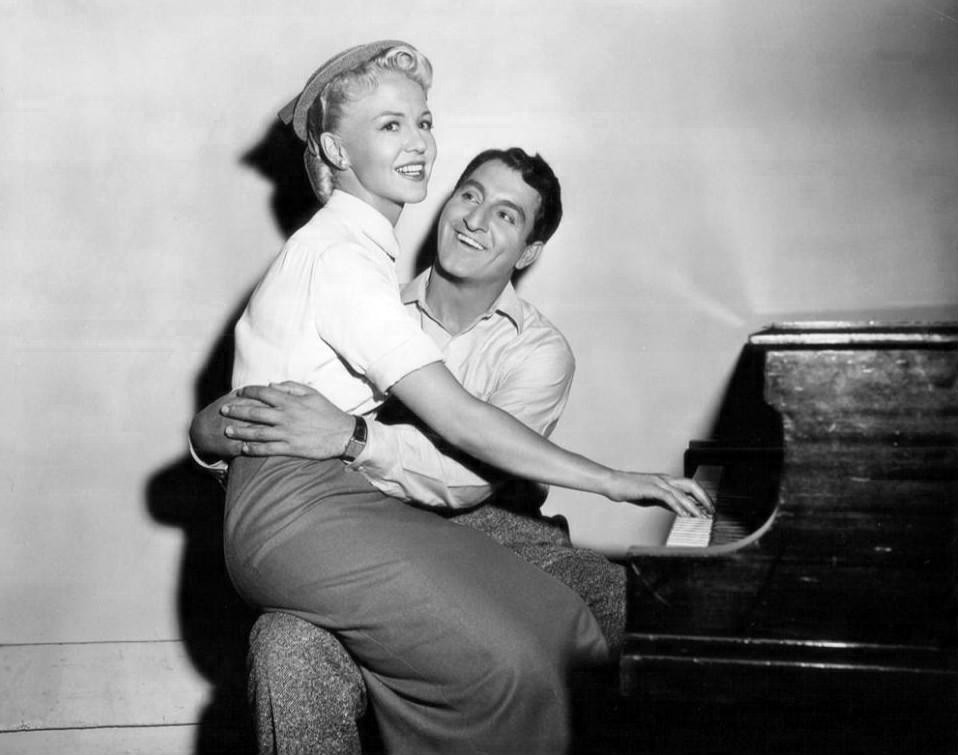
Photo of Peggy Lee and Danny Thomas from The Jazz Singer in 1952.

Lee starred opposite Danny Thomas in The Jazz Singer (1952), a remake of the Al Jolson film, The Jazz Singer (1927). She played an alcoholic blues singer in Pete Kelly's Blues (1955), for which she was nominated for the Academy Award for Best Supporting Actress.

Lee provided speaking and singing voices for several characters in the Disney movie Lady and the Tramp (1955), playing the human Darling, the dog Peg, and the two Siamese cats, Si and Am. She also co-wrote, with Sonny Burke, all of the original songs for the film, including "He's A Tramp", "Bella Notte", "La La Lu", "The Siamese Cat Song", and "Peace on Earth". In 1987, when Lady and the Tramp was released on VHS, Lee sought performance and song royalties on the video sales. When the Disney company refused to pay, she filed a lawsuit in 1988. After a prolonged legal battle, in 1992, Lee was awarded $2.3 million for breach of contract, plus $500,000 for unjust enrichment, $600,000 for illegal use of Lee's voice and $400,000 for the use of her name.

Peggy Lee also wrote the lyrics for "Johnny Guitar" (with music composer Victor Young), the title track of the 1954 film, Johnny Guitar, which she sings partially at the end of the movie.

During her career, Lee appeared in hundreds of variety shows, and several TV movies and specials.

=== Songwriting ===
Lee wrote or co-wrote more than 270 songs. In addition to her own material to sing, she was hired to score and compose songs for movies. For the Disney movie Lady and the Tramp, she co-composed all of the original songs with Burke, and supplied the singing and speaking voices of four characters.

Over the years, her songwriting collaborators included David Barbour, Laurindo Almeida, Harold Arlen, Sonny Burke, Cy Coleman, Duke Ellington, Dave Grusin, Quincy Jones, Francis Lai, Jack Marshall, Johnny Mandel, Marian McPartland, Willard Robison, Lalo Schifrin, and Victor Young.

Lee's first published song was in 1941, "Little Fool". "What More Can a Woman Do?" was recorded by Sarah Vaughan with Dizzy Gillespie and Charlie Parker. "Mañana (Is Soon Enough for Me)" was number one on the Billboard singles chart for nine weeks in 1948, from the week of March 13 to May.

Lee was a mainstay of Capitol Records when rock and roll came onto the American music scene. She was among the first of the "old guard" to recognize this new genre, as seen by her recording music from the Beatles, Randy Newman, Carole King, James Taylor, and other up-and-coming songwriters. From 1957 until her final disc for the company in 1972, Lee produced a steady stream of two or three albums per year that usually included standards (often arranged quite differently from the original), her own compositions, and material from young artists.

Many of her compositions have become standards, performed by singers such as Tony Bennett, Nat King Cole, Natalie Cole, Bing Crosby, Doris Day, Ella Fitzgerald, Judy Garland, Diana Krall, Queen Latifah, Barry Manilow, Bette Midler, Janelle Monae, Nina Simone, Regina Spektor, Sarah Vaughan and others.

== Personal life ==
Lee was married four times: to guitarist and composer Dave Barbour (1943–1951), actor Brad Dexter (1953–1954), actor Dewey Martin (1956–1958), and percussionist Jack Del Rio (1964), the father of the football executive Jack Del Rio. All the marriages ended in divorce.

On November 11, 1943, Lee gave birth to her only child, daughter Nicki Lee Foster (who died in 2014), in her marriage to Barbour.

Lee learned Transcendental Meditation and said she was taught "by the Maharishi personally and that was a great honor."

=== Lawsuit ===
In 1987, Peggy Lee was asked to help promote the first VHS release of Lady and the Tramp, for which she was paid an honorarium of $500. Lee contended Disney had breached the 1952 contract she had signed with the studio, which denied Disney the right to make "transcriptions for sale to the public" without her approval. Disney CEO Michael Eisner refused to pay Lee her share of the royalties. On November 16, 1988, Lee sued the Walt Disney Company for breach of contract, claiming that she retained the rights to transcriptions of the music, arguing that videotape editions were transcriptions. Her lawyers demanded $50 million in damages for compensation. In March 1991, Lee was awarded $2.3 million for breach of contract, plus $500,000 for unjust enrichment, $600,000 for illegal use of Lee's voice and $400,000 for the use of her name. From the $72 million Disney had earned in videocassette sales, by 1995, Lee's award was estimated to be four percent of the sales.

In October 1992, the California Court of Appeals upheld the judgement that Disney had to pay Lee over $3 million in compensation. Though videocassettes did not exist when Lee signed her contract with Disney, she nevertheless had retained the rights to phonograph recordings and transcriptions of the film. Stephen Lachs, a Los Angeles County Superior Court judge, later ruled that videocassettes were considered under the category of transcriptions. In December 1992, the California Supreme Court denied a hearing on Disney's appeal of lower-court rulings, which upheld the studio had committed breach of contract.

=== Illness and death ===
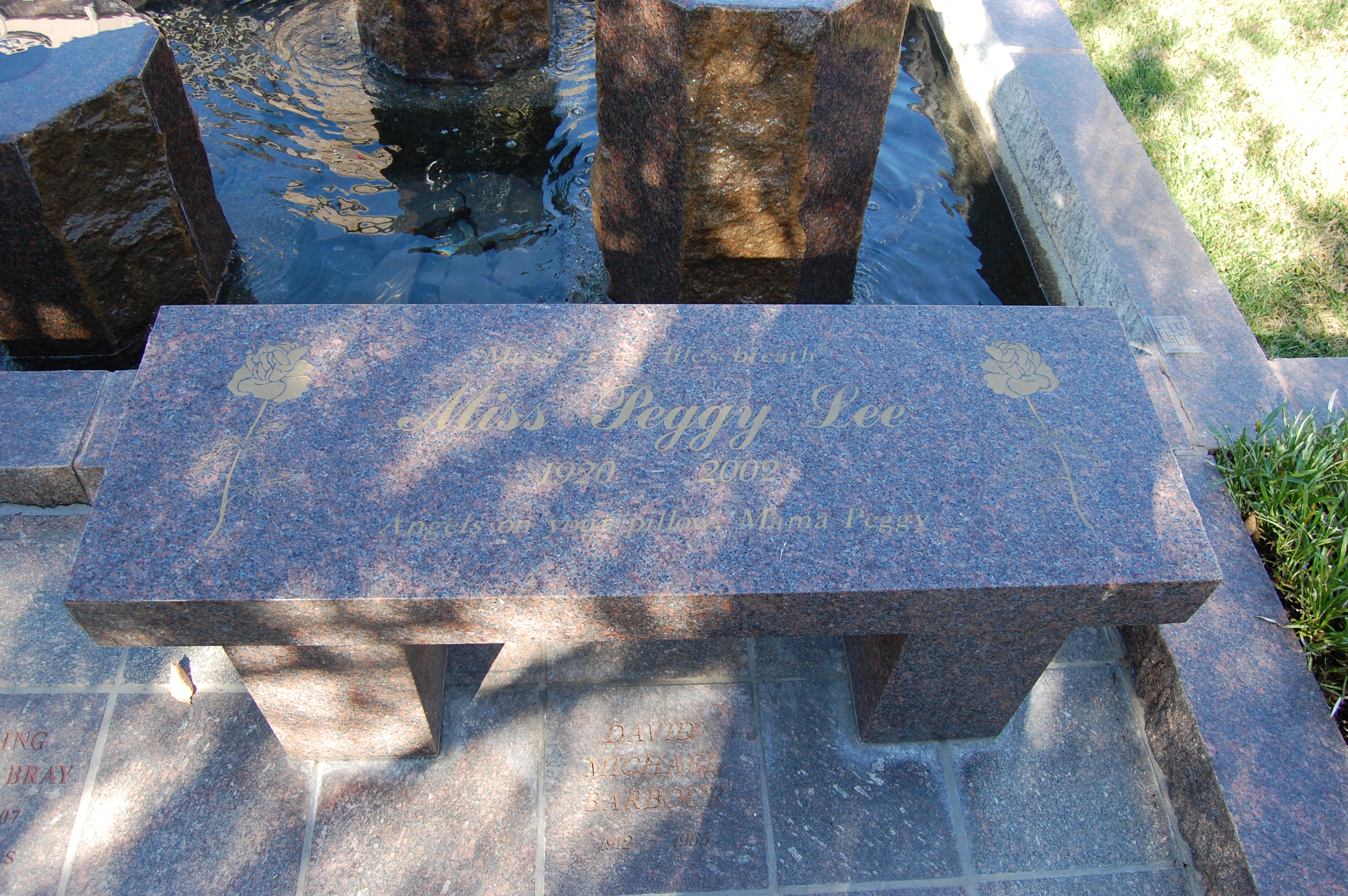
The Peggy Lee bench-style burial monument

Lee continued to perform into the 1990s, sometimes using a wheelchair. After years of poor health, she died of complications from diabetes and a heart attack on January 21, 2002, at the age of 81. Lee was cremated and her ashes were buried with a bench-style monument in Westwood Village Memorial Park Cemetery in Los Angeles.

== Legacy ==
Lee is often cited as the inspiration for the Margarita cocktail. In 1948, after a trip to Mexico, she and her husband ventured into the Balinese Room in Galveston, Texas. She requested a drink similar to one she had had in Mexico, and the head bartender, Santos Cruz, created the Margarita, and named it after the Spanish version of Peggy's name.

Lee was awarded a star on the Hollywood Walk of Fame for Recording in 1960. The star is at 6319 Hollywood Boulevard.

Baseball's Tug McGraw, whose career with both the New York Mets and Philadelphia Phillies ranged from 1965 to 1984, named one of his pitches the Peggy Lee. He explained to The Philadelphia Inquirer: "That's the one where the hitter is out in front of it and says, 'Is that all there is?'"

In 1971, Lee sang the Lord's Prayer at the funeral of Louis Armstrong.

In 1972, journalist Linda Deutsch described Lee as "the Queen" of pop music.

The designer of the Miss Piggy Muppet, Bonnie Erickson, who grew up in Lee's home state of North Dakota, was inspired by Lee for the Miss Piggy character in 1974. Originally called Miss Piggy Lee, her name was shortened to Miss Piggy when the Muppet gained fame.

In 1975, Lee received an honorary doctorate in music from North Dakota State University, and in 2000, she received another from Jamestown University.

In 1983, Lee had a hybrid tea rose named in her honor that was pink with a touch of peach. The Peggy Lee Rose was the 1983 American Beauty Rose of the Year.

In 2003, "There'll Be Another Spring: A Tribute to Miss Peggy Lee" was held at Carnegie Hall. Produced by recording artist Richard Barone, the sold-out event included performances by Cy Coleman, Debbie Harry, Nancy Sinatra, Rita Moreno, Marian McPartland, Chris Connor, Petula Clark, Maria Muldaur, Dee Dee Bridgewater, Quincy Jones, Shirley Horn, and others. In 2004, Barone brought the event to a sold-out Hollywood Bowl, and then to Chicago's Ravinia Festival, with expanded casts including Maureen McGovern, Jack Jones, and Bea Arthur. The Carnegie Hall concert was broadcast on NPR's JazzSet.

The Wimbledon depot building, where she and her family lived and worked, became the Midland Continental Depot Transportation Museum, featuring The Peggy Lee Exhibit, in 2012. The upper floor of the museum, where the Egstrom family once lived, features exhibits that trace Lee's career and her regional and state connection.

On the occasion of the 100th anniversary of Lee's birth, May 26, 2020, The Grammy Museum hosted an online panel discussion featuring musicians Billie Eilish, k.d. lang, Eric Burton (The Black Pumas), as well as Lee's granddaughter, Holly Foster Wells, and the author of Peggy Lee: A Century of Song, Tish Oney.

Lee has been noted as an influence on artists such as Paul McCartney, Madonna, Beyoncé, k.d. lang, Elvis Costello, Diana Krall, Dusty Springfield, Rita Coolidge, Rita Moreno, and Billie Eilish.

In 2020, the ASCAP Foundation, along with Lee's family, established the annual Peggy Lee Songwriter Award. The inaugural award went to Michael Blum and Jenna Lotti for their song "Fake ID".

== Work ==
=== Discography ===
- Rendezvous with Peggy Lee (Capitol, 1948; 1950 [10"]; 1955 [12"])
- Benny Goodman with Peggy Lee (Columbia, 1949)
- My Best to You: Peggy Lee Sings (Capitol, 1950)
- Road to Bali: Selections from the Paramount Picture (Decca, 1952)
- Black Coffee (Decca, 1953; 1956 [12"])
- Selections from Irving Berlin's White Christmas (Decca, 1954)
- Peggy: Songs in an Intimate Style (Decca, 1954)
- Songs from Pete Kelly's Blues (Decca, 1955)
- Songs from Walt Disney's Lady and the Tramp (Decca, 1955)
- The Man I Love (Capitol, 1957)
- Peggy Lee Sings with Benny Goodman (Harmony, 1957)
- Dream Street (Decca, 1957)
- Jump for Joy (Capitol, 1958)
- Things Are Swingin' (Capitol, 1958)
- Miss Wonderful (Decca, 1958)
- Sea Shells (Decca, 1958)
- Beauty and the Beat! with George Shearing (Capitol, 1959)
- I Like Men! (Capitol, 1959)
- Christmas Carousel (Capitol, 1960)
- Latin ala Lee! (Capitol, 1960)
- Pretty Eyes (Capitol, 1960)
- Basin Street East Proudly Presents Miss Peggy Lee (Capitol, 1961)
- If You Go (Capitol, 1961)
- Olé ala Lee (Capitol, 1960)
- All Aglow Again! (1960)
- Sugar 'n' Spice (Capitol, 1962)
- Blues Cross Country (Capitol, 1962)
- The Fabulous Peggy Lee (Decca, 1963)
- Mink Jazz (Capitol, 1963)
- The Fabulous Miss Lee (World Record Club, 1963)
- I'm a Woman (Capitol, 1963)
- Lover (Decca, 1963)
- In the Name of Love (Capitol, 1964)
- In Love Again! (Capitol, 1964)
- Then Was Then – Now Is Now! (Capitol, 1965)
- Pass Me By (Capitol, 1965)
- Happy Holiday (Capitol, 1965)
- Guitars a là Lee (Capitol, 1966)
- Big $pender (Capitol, 1966)
- So Blue (Vocalion, 1966)
- Extra Special! (Capitol, 1967)
- Somethin' Groovy! (Capitol, 1967)
- 2 Shows Nightly (Capitol, 1968)
- Is That All There Is? (Capitol, 1969)
- A Natural Woman (Capitol, 1969)
- Bridge Over Troubled Water (Capitol, 1970)
- Make It With You (Capitol, 1970)
- Crazy in the Heart (Vocalion, 1970)
- Where Did They Go (Capitol, 1971)
- Norma Deloris Egstrom from Jamestown, North Dakota (Capitol, 1972)
- Peggy Lee (Everest Archive, 1974)
- Let's Love (Atlantic, 1974)
- Mirrors (A&M, 1975)
- Peggy (Polydor, 1977)
- Live in London (Polydor, 1977)
- Walt Disney's Lady and the Tramp: All the Songs from the Film (Disneyland, 1979)
- Close Enough for Love (DRG, 1979)
- You Can Depend On Me: 14 Previously Unreleased Songs (Glendale, 1981)
- The Music Makers Program 116 for Broadcast Week of 4/19/82 (Music Makers, 1982)
- Easy Listening with Woody Herman, Dave Barbour (Artistic Art, 1984)
- The Uncollected Peggy Lee (Hindsight, 1985)
- If I Could Be with You (Sounds Rare 1986)
- Miss Peggy Lee Sings the Blues (Musicmasters, 1988)
- The Peggy Lee Songbook: There'll Be Another Spring (Musical Heritage Society, 1990)
- Peggy Lee with the Dave Barbour Band (Laserlight, 1991)
- Love Held Lightly: Rare Songs by Harold Arlen (Angel, 1993)
- Moments Like This (Chesky, 1993)

== Accolades ==
Lee was nominated for 13 Grammy Awards. In 1969, her hit "Is That All There Is?" won her the Grammy for Best Contemporary Vocal Performance. In 1995, she was given the Grammy Lifetime Achievement Award.

She received the Rough Rider Award from the state of North Dakota in 1975, the Pied Piper Award from the American Society of Composers, Authors and Publishers in 1990, the Ella Award for Lifetime Achievement from the Society of Singers in 1994, the Living Legacy Award from the Women's International Center in 1994, and the Presidents Award from the Songwriters Guild of America in 1999. Other honors include induction into the Big Band Jazz Hall of Fame in 1992, the Songwriters Hall of Fame in 1999, and the Songbook Hall of Fame from the Great American Songbook Foundation in 2020.

== Bibliography ==
- Bohn, James (2017). Music in Disney's Animated Features: Snow White and the Seven Dwarfs to The Jungle Book. University Press of Mississippi. ISBN 978-1-4968-1215-5.
- Friedwald, Will. The Best of Peggy Lee: The Capitol Years (Liner notes).
- Gavin, James (2014). Is That All There Is? – The Strange Life of Peggy Lee. Atria Books. ISBN 978-1-4516-4168-4.
- Lee, Peggy (1989). Miss Peggy Lee: An Autobiography. Donald I. Fine. ISBN 978-1-5561-1112-9.
- Oney, Tish (2020). Peggy Lee: A Century of Song. Rowman & Littlefield. ISBN 978-1-5381-2847-3.
- Richmond, Peter (2006). Fever: The Life and Music of Miss Peggy Lee. Henry Holt and Company. ISBN 0-8050-7383-3.
- Strom, Robert (2005). Miss Peggy Lee: A Career Chronicle. Jefferson, North Carolina: McFarland Publishing. ISBN 0-7864-1936-9.
- Whitburn, Joel (1973). "Joel Whitburn's Top LP's, 1945-1972". Record Research.

Whitburn, Joel (1982). Joel Whitburn's Bubbling under the hot 100, 1959-1981. Menomonee Falls, Wisconsin: Record Research. p. 98. ISBN 978-0-8982-0047-8.

- Whitburn, Joel (2002). Joel Whitburn's top pop singles 1955-2002. Menomonee Falls, Wisconsin: Record Research. pp. 404–405. ISBN 0898201551.
- Whitburn, Joel (2007). Joel Whitburn presents Billboard top adult songs, 1961-2006: chart data compiled from Billboard's adult contemporary charts, 1961-2006, and adult top 40 charts, 1996-2006. Menomonee Falls, Wisconsin: Record Research Inc. ISBN 978-0-89820-169-7.
- Whitburn, Joel (2009). Joel Whitburn's top pop singles. Menomonee Falls, Wisconsin: Record Research. ISBN 978-0-89820-180-2.
