= Black Coffee (Peggy Lee album) =

Studio album by Peggy Lee
- Released: 1953 10"; August 1956 12"
- Recorded: April 30, May 1 & 4, 1953; April 3, 1956
- Studio: New York City
- Genre: Jazz
- Length: 34:52
- Label: Decca American

Peggy Lee chronology
Black Coffee (1953)	Songs from Pete Kelly's Blues (1955)

Black Coffee is the second album by Peggy Lee. It was released in the 10-inch format in 1953 by Decca. In 1956, at the request of the record label, Lee recorded four more songs for a reissue of the album in the 12-inch LP format.

== History ==
By 1953, Lee had been recording professionally since joining the Benny Goodman Orchestra in 1941, but had only released songs on 78s or 45s. This was her first opportunity to record an album. In the early 1950s, record companies usually reserved the 12-in LP for classical music, and in the case of Decca and Columbia, cast recordings of Broadway musicals. This practice ended after this LP was recorded. Ten-inch records were discontinued generally by the mid-1950s. Lee added four songs at sessions in 1956 to expand the running time to the 12-in LP.

== Reception ==
Professional ratings
Review scores
Source	Rating
Allmusic	4.5/5 stars

Neither the 10 nor the 12-in release made the Popular Album Chart, with the chart expanding to a listing of 10 to 30 LPs on average during 1956. Joni Mitchell declared the album one of her favorites, leading off her torch song album of 2000, Both Sides Now, with a selection from Black Coffee, "You're My Thrill". In his book Jazz Singing, Will Friedwald names the album one of his desert island discs.

== Sessions ==
Three sessions in 1953 yielded eight tracks for the 10-in LP at Decca Studios on West 57th Street in New York City on April 30, May 1, and May 4. The 1956 sessions to record the additional four tracks the 12-in LP were at Decca studios in Hollywood on April 3 with different personnel.

On October 26, 2004, the album was reissued as part of the Verve Master Edition series. Verve and Decca are owned by Universal. The track sequence followed the 1956 12-in reissue. No producer is listed. Milt Gabler is mentioned in the reissue credits as artists and repertoire representative for Decca.

== Track listing / original 10" vinyl album (Decca DL-5482, released 1953) ==
=== Side one ===
1. "Black Coffee" (Sonny Burke, Paul Francis Webster) – 3:05
2. "I've Got You Under My Skin" (Cole Porter) – 2:28
3. "Easy Living" (Ralph Rainger, Leo Robin) – 2:44
4. "My Heart Belongs to Daddy" (Porter) – 2:09

=== Side two ===
1. "A Woman Alone With the Blues" (Willard Robison) – 3:12
2. "I Didn't Know What Time It Was" (Richard Rodgers, Lorenz Hart) – 2:18
3. "(Ah, the Apple Trees) When the World Was Young" (M. Philippe-Gerard, Angele Vannier, Johnny Mercer) – 3:16
4. "Love Me or Leave Me" (Gus Kahn, Walter Donaldson) – 2:08

== Track listing / 12" vinyl album (Decca DL-8358, released 1956) ==
=== Side one ===
1. "Black Coffee" – 3:05
2. "I've Got You Under My Skin" – 2:28
3. "Easy Living" – 2:44
4. "My Heart Belongs to Daddy" – 2:09
5. "It Ain't Necessarily So" (George Gershwin, Ira Gershwin, DuBose Heyward) – 3:22
6. "Gee Baby, Ain't I Good to You?" (Don Redman, Andy Razaf) – 3:22

=== Side two ===
1. "A Woman Alone With the Blues" – 3:12
2. "I Didn't Know What Time It Was" – 2:18
3. "(Ah, the Apple Trees) When the World Was Young" – 3:16
4. "Love Me or Leave Me" – 2:08
5. "You're My Thrill" (Sidney Clare, Jay Gorney) – 3:22
6. "There's a Small Hotel" (Rodgers, Hart) – 2:44

== Personnel ==
=== 1953 sessions ===
- Peggy Lee – vocals
- Pete Candoli – trumpet
- Jimmy Rowles – piano
- Max Wayne – double bass
- Ed Shaughnessy – drums

=== 1956 sessions ===
- Peggy Lee – vocals
- Stella Castellucci – harp
- Lou Levy – piano
- Bill Pitman – guitar
- Buddy Clark – bass
- Larry Bunker – drums, vibraphone, percussion
