= Where Did They Go (album) =

Studio album by Peggy Lee
- Released: July 1971
- Recorded: April 5, 6 & May 11, 1971
- Genre: Pop
- Length: 29:56
- Label: Capitol
- Producer: Snuff Garrett

Peggy Lee chronology
| Make It With You (1970) | Where Did They Go (1971) | Norma Deloris Egstrom from Jamestown, North Dakota (1972) |

Where Did They Go is a 1971 album by Peggy Lee. It was arranged and conducted by Don Sebesky and Al Capps.

== Track listing ==
1. "Where Did They Go" (Harry Lloyd, Gloria Sklerov) - 3:53
2. "My Rock and Foundation" (Burt Bacharach, Hal David) - 2:37
3. "Help Me Make It Through the Night" (Kris Kristofferson) - 2:45
4. "All I Want" (Steve Clayton [aka P. Tedesco], Gladys Shelley) - 2:40
5. "I Don't Know How to Love Him" (Tim Rice, Andrew Lloyd Webber) - 3:24
6. "Goodbye Again" (Donald J. Addrissi, Richard P. Addrissi) - 2:33
7. "Sing" (Joe Raposo) - 2:25
8. "I Was Born in Love with You" (Alan Bergman, Marilyn Bergman, Michel Legrand) - 4:01
9. "Losing My Mind" (Stephen Sondheim) - 2:43
10. "My Sweet Lord" (George Harrison) - 2:55

== Notes ==
The recording sessions for this album took place at the Capitol Tower in Hollywood, California.

Where Did They Go was Peggy Lee's first album not to make the Billboard 200 chart since her Grammy-winning hit "Is That All There Is?" in 1969.

Burt Bacharach and Hal David wrote the song "My Rock And Foundation" specifically for Lee.

Capitol Records released "Where Did They Go" (backed by "All I Want") as a 45" single in 1971. The single did not make the charts.

Lee performed songs from this album, including "Where Did They Go" and "My Sweet Lord," during her June 1971 engagement at The Frontier Hotel in Las Vegas, Nevada.

After completing work on Where Did They Go, Peggy Lee did not return to the recording studio again until nearly a year later, when she began recording Norma Deloris Egstrom from Jamestown, North Dakota in April 1972.

This album was released on 8-track, along with LP.
