= Make It with You (album) =

Studio album by Peggy Lee
- Released: November 1970
- Recorded: July 21, Aug. 5 & 27, 1970
- Studio: Capitol (Hollywood, California)
- Genre: Pop
- Length: 31:14
- Label: Capitol
- Producer: Phil Wright

Peggy Lee chronology
Bridge Over Troubled Water (1970)	Make It with You (1970)	Where Did They Go (1971)

Professional ratings
Review scores
Source	Rating
AllMusic	3.5/5 stars
Billboard	unrated

Make It with You is a 1970 album by Peggy Lee. It was arranged and conducted by Benny Golson. The album peaked at No. 194 on the Billboard Top LPs (now known as the Billboard 200), in December 1970. It was Lee's last album to make the Billboard chart.

== Track listing ==
1. "One More Ride on the Merry-Go-Round" (Howard Greenfield, Neil Sedaka) - 2:18
2. "The Long and Winding Road" (John Lennon, Paul McCartney) - 3:20
3. "That's What Living's About" (Paul Anka) - 2:29
4. "The No-Color Time of Day" (Barbara Fried, Milton Schafer) - 2:52
5. "Let's Get Lost in Now" (Charles Cane Courtney, Peter Link) - 3:08
6. "Make It with You" (David Gates) - 3:18
7. "Passenger of the Rain" (Sébastien Japrisot, Francis Albert Lai, Peggy Lee) - 4:00
8. "I've Never Been So Happy in My Life" (Lew Spence) - 2:29
9. "You'll Remember Me" (Arthur Hamilton, Stan Worth) - 3:15
10. "Goodbye" (Gordon Jenkins) - 3:53

== Notes ==
The recording sessions for this album took place at Capitol Studios in Hollywood, California.

Peggy Lee recorded "You'll Remember Me" in February 1970 for Bridge Over Troubled Water, her previous album for Capitol Records. The song was a minor hit single, peaking at #16 on the Billboard Easy Listening chart, and so it was released on both Make It With You and Bridge Over Troubled Water. Unlike the rest of the album, "You'll Remember Me" was arranged by Mike Melvoin.

The 2008 Collectors' Choice Music CD reissue of Make It With You also included the song "Pieces of Dreams (Little Boy Lost)" (the Oscar-nominated theme from the 1970 movie of the same name), which Lee recorded on June 1, 1970, between the sessions for Bridge Over Troubled Water and the sessions for this album.

Lee had recently turned 50 when she recorded this album. She had also won a Grammy Award for Best Contemporary Female Vocal Performance for "Is That All There Is?" in March 1970.

In a 1983 interview with the magazine Crescendo International, Benny Golson, the arranger of this album, said:

On the other hand — what a delight to work with Peggy Lee. I mean, she’s a real professional. I had an experience with her that I’ve never had with any other artist as the arranger/conductor of the music for a complete recording session (Make It with You on Capitol). Incidentally, at a time when people were all overdubbing the strings, the horns and everything, she insisted on doing the whole date live. The strings, the whole orchestra was there, and she was singing in the room. We did half of it in L.A. and half in New York. She wasn’t there for the mix, and when she heard it, it had been mixed so that the singing was very loud and you could hardly hear the arrangements – the vocal was just wiping the brass and everything. She said: 'The voice is too loud.' They went back in and remixed it, and she went with ‘em this time – that’s the way it should be.

Of course, that was more money she’d have to pay off, for the remixing of the session, before she’d go into profit. I never got over that. I talked to her about it later; I said: "That was really something, Peggy, that you would do that." Yes, Peggy is very musicianly; she writes good lyrics too.

"Passenger of the Rain" is the theme from the 1969 French film Rider on the Rain (or Le Passager de la Pluie). Lee wrote the English lyrics, which she sings on this album.

== Charts ==
Chart (1970)	Peak position
US Billboard Top LPs	194
