= Is That All There Is? =

1969 single by Peggy Lee

Single by Peggy Lee

from the album Is That All There Is?
- B-side: "Me and My Shadow"
- Released: August 1969
- Recorded: 1969
- Studio: Capitol, Hollywood
- Genre: Vocal jazz, traditional pop
- Length: 4:19
- Label: Capitol
- Songwriter: Jerry Leiber and Mike Stoller
- Producers: Jerry Leiber and Mike Stoller

Peggy Lee singles chronology
"Spinning Wheel" (1969)	"Is That All There Is?" (1969)	"Whistle for Happiness" (1969)

"Is That All There Is?" is a song written by the American songwriting team Jerry Leiber and Mike Stoller. It became a hit for the American singer Peggy Lee in 1969. The song was originally performed by Georgia Brown in May 1967 for a television special. It was first recorded by disc jockey Dan Daniel in March 1968, but this was an unauthorized recording that went unissued at the songwriters' request. The first authorized recording was by Leslie Uggams in August 1968.

Peggy Lee's version reached number 11 on the U.S. pop singles chart, becoming her first Top 40 pop hit since "Fever" eleven years earlier, and topping the adult contemporary chart. It also reached number six in Canada. It won Lee the Grammy Award for Best Female Pop Vocal Performance and later was inducted into the Grammy Hall of Fame.

The orchestral arrangement on Lee's version was composed and conducted by Randy Newman, who played the piano in the song's introduction.

American President Donald Trump revealed in 2016 that Peggy Lee's version of the hit tune is his favorite song.

== Theme ==
The lyrics of this song are written from the point of view of a person who is disillusioned with events in life that are supposedly unique experiences. The singer tells of witnessing her family's house on fire when she was a little girl, seeing the circus, and falling in love for the first time. After each recital, she expresses her disappointment in the experience. She suggests that we "break out the booze and have a ball—if that's all there is," instead of worrying about life. She explains that she'll never kill herself either because she knows that death will be a disappointment as well. The verses of the song are spoken, rather than sung. Only the refrain of the song is sung.

In most arrangements of the song, most notably in Peggy Lee's version, the music recalls the style of Kurt Weill, typified by songs such as "Alabama Song" and "Surabaya Johnny".

== Background ==
The song was inspired by the 1896 story "Disillusionment" by Thomas Mann. Jerry Leiber's wife Gaby Rodgers (née Gabrielle Rosenberg) was born in Germany and lived in the Netherlands. She escaped ahead of the Nazis, settling in Hollywood where she had a brief film career. Rodgers introduced Leiber to the works of Thomas Mann. The lines "Is that all there is to a fire?/Is that all there is/is that all there is?" and three of the events in the song (the fire, failed love, imagined death) are based on the narrator's words in Mann's story; the central idea of both the short story and the song are the same.

Leiber and Stoller first gave the song to Georgia Brown to perform for a BBC television special in 1967. She asked Leiber and Stoller to add a sung chorus alongside the spoken verses. Leiber and Stoller attached a chorus they had written for another song, but realized the chorus did not fit, so wrote lyrics and music for a new chorus which miraculously fit together without any changes. While Brown performed the song on television as planned, it was never recorded as a single.

Leiber and Stoller considered giving the song to Kurt Weill's widow Lotte Lenya or German kabarett singer Claire Waldoff (who, apparently unbeknownst to them, was deceased), but decided that Marlene Dietrich was the only such name that American record companies would consider well-known enough. However, after a meeting with Leiber and Stoller, Dietrich rejected the song. Barbra Streisand's manager was sent the song but never responded. The song first appeared commercially in 1968, on Leslie Uggams' album What's an Uggams? alongside other Leiber and Stoller songs. Leiber and Stoller intended to incorporate "Is That All There Is?" into a musical version of International Wrestling Match, an off-Broadway play by Jeff Weiss; although the project never materialized, the initial releases of the song's sheet music and of the Peggy Lee single were labeled as "from the forthcoming production International Wrestling Match". Leiber and Stoller then offered the song to Peggy Lee, who enthusiastically accepted and suggested that Randy Newman arrange the song.

During the session, Lee delivered an impressive performance on take 36 that the engineer forgot to record, so one more take was needed. Capitol Records was reluctant to release it, but after Joey Bishop was not interested in booking any of Capitol's acts except Lee for his show, they agreed. Despite the song's success, Lee was not then interested in further collaboration with Leiber and Stoller. Leiber was also upset that Lee said "I’m not ready for that final disappointment" during the recording instead of the originally written "I’m in no hurry for that final disappointment."

== Chart history ==
=== Weekly charts ===
Chart (1969)	Peak position
Australia (Kent Music Report)	62
Canada RPM Adult Contemporary	1
Canada RPM Top Singles	6
U.S. Billboard Hot 100	11
U.S. Billboard Easy Listening	1
U.S. Cash Box Top 100 Singles	10
U.S. Record World Singles Chart	8

=== Year-end charts ===
Chart (1969)	Rank
U.S. (Joel Whitburn's Pop Annual)	105
US Billboard Easy Listening	20

== Cover versions ==
This song has been covered by Chaka Khan, Giant Sand, Sandra Bernhard, John Parish and PJ Harvey, Alan Price, The Bobs, Firewater, The New Standards, The Tiger Lillies, Amanda Lear, Joan Morris, James Last, Razorhouse and Camille O'Sullivan among others. In 1971 Ornella Vanoni recorded an Italian version (text written by Bruno Lauzi) with the title literally translated as "È poi tutto qui?"; in 1972 Hildegard Knef released a German version called "Wenn das alles ist".

Dorothy Squires recorded the song for her 1977 release Rain Rain Go Away. Bolcom and Morris included a version on their 1978 album Other Songs by Leiber & Stoller. Kate and Mike Westbrook covered it for their 2009 CD allsorts.

In 1970, Diana Ross performed a version of the song at a performance at the Coconut Grove in Los Angeles with altered lyrics. That recording was not released.

Another version with altered lyrics, by No wave singer Cristina, was available briefly as a single on the ZE and Island labels in 1980. However, Leiber and Stoller sued and were able to get it suppressed for some time. Produced by August Darnell (Kid Creole), this version was eventually re-issued in 2004 as a bonus track on a Cristina compilation album.

Bette Midler included both audio and video versions on her 2005 DualDisc Bette Midler Sings the Peggy Lee Songbook.

In the thirteenth season of American Horror Story, the character Elsa Mars (Jessica Lange) performs "Is That All There Is?" in the episode of the same name.

== See also ==
- List of number-one adult contemporary singles of 1969 (U.S.)
