= 2018–19 West Ham United F.C. Women season =

West Ham United
2018–19 season
- Chairman: Jack Sullivan
- Head Coach: Matt Beard
- Stadium: Rush Green Stadium, Romford
- FA WSL: 7th
- FA Cup: Runner-up
- League Cup: Quarter-final
- Top goalscorer: League: Jane Ross (11); All: Jane Ross (7)
- Highest home attendance: 1,966 (vs. Liverpool, 21 October)
- Lowest home attendance: League: 376 (vs. Yeovil Town, 30 September); All: 255 (vs. Lewes, 26 August, League Cup)
- Average home league attendance: 880
Home colours	Away colours	Third colours

The 2018–19 West Ham United F.C. Women season was the club's 28th season in existence and their first in the FA Women's Super League, the highest level of the football pyramid and their first as a fully professional team. Along with competing in the WSL, the club also contested two domestic cup competitions: the FA Cup and the League Cup.

On 28 May 2018, it was announced that West Ham United Ladies had been granted a WSL licence, promoting the team from the third-tier FA Women's Premier League. Rosie Kmita and Vyan Sampson were the only players to remain with the club and sign on professional terms following promotion. Former WSL winner Matt Beard was appointed head coach on 7 June 2018. They changed their name to West Ham United F.C. Women in July 2018.

The season was also notable as the subject of the BBC behind-the-scenes documentary Britain's Youngest Football Boss.

== Squad ==
Note: Flags indicate national team as defined under FIFA eligibility rules; some limited exceptions apply. Players may hold more than one non-FIFA nationality.

No.	Pos.	Nation	Player
1	GK	ENG	Becky Spencer
2	DF	NZL	Ria Percival
3	DF	USA	Erin Simon
4	DF	USA	Brooke Hendrix
5	DF	ENG	Gilly Flaherty (captain)
6	MF	NED	Tessel Middag
7	FW	SUI	Alisha Lehmann
8	FW	IRL	Leanne Kiernan
9	FW	SCO	Jane Ross
10	MF	GER	Julia Simic

No.	Pos.	Nation	Player
11	DF	ENG	Claire Rafferty
12	MF	ENG	Kate Longhurst
13	GK	ENG	Anna Moorhouse
14	DF	ENG	Vyan Sampson
15	MF	USA	Brianna Visalli
16	FW	ENG	Rosie Kmita
17	FW	NED	Esmee de Graaf
18	MF	NED	Lucienne Reichardt
19	FW	CAN	Adriana Leon
20	MF	KOR	Cho So-hyun

== FA Women's Super League ==
=== Results summary ===
Overall								Home						Away					
Pld	W	D	L	GF	GA	GD	Pts	W	D	L	GF	GA	GD	W	D	L	GF	GA	GD
20	7	2	11	25	37	−12	23	2	1	7	8	18	−10	5	1	4	17	19	−2

Last updated: 11 May 2019.
Source: FA WSL

=== Results ===
19 September 2018 1	West Ham United	0–0	Reading	Romford
19:45	Simic (yellow card) 19'; Simon (yellow card) 64'	Report	Howard (yellow card) 81'	Stadium: Rush Green Stadium; Attendance: 658; Referee: Abby Marriott

23 September 2018 2	Arsenal	4–3	West Ham United	Borehamwood
14:00	van de Donk 12', 41', 62'; Little 73'	Report	Longhurst 9', 17'; Rafferty 86'	Stadium: Meadow Park; Attendance: 1,081; Referee: Paul Howard

30 September 2018 3	West Ham United	2–1	Yeovil Town	Romford
15:00	Kiernan 67'; Kmita 80'; Longhurst (yellow card) 88'; de Graaf (yellow card) 90+8'	Report	Goddard (yellow card) 12'; Mason 78'	Stadium: Rush Green Stadium; Attendance: 376; Referee: David Spain

14 October 2018 4	Manchester City	7–1	West Ham United	Manchester
12:30	Weir 2'; Parris 7', 17'; Stanway 72', 80'; Houghton 76'; Wullaert 86'	Report	de Graaf 82'	Stadium: Academy Stadium; Attendance: 1,245; Referee: Rebecca Welch

21 October 2018 5	West Ham United	0–1	Liverpool	Romford
15:00	Percival (yellow card) 61'	Report	Sweetman-Kirk 7'; Babajide (yellow card) 90+8'	Stadium: Rush Green Stadium; Attendance: 1,966; Referee: Jack Packman

28 October 2018 6	Everton	1–2	West Ham United	Southport
14:00	Walker 5'	Report	Ross 27'; Lehmann 45'; Longhurst (yellow card) 86'; Kiernan (yellow card) 90'	Stadium: Haig Avenue; Attendance: 143; Referee: Aaron Jackson

4 November 2018 7	West Ham United	0–2	Chelsea	Romford
15:00	Flaherty (yellow card) 29'; de Graaf (yellow card) 50'	Report	Bachmann 62', 85'; Andersson (yellow card) 83'	Stadium: Rush Green Stadium; Attendance: 962; Referee: Paul Howard

18 November 2018 8	Birmingham City	3–0	West Ham United	Solihull
14:00	Harrop 19'; Follis 40'; Staniforth 79'	Report	Kiernan (yellow card) 54'	Stadium: Damson Park; Attendance: 633; Referee: Stacey Pearson

25 November 2018 9	West Ham United	2–0	Bristol City	Romford
15:00	Lehmann 13'; Ross 89'	Report	Brown (yellow card) 63'	Stadium: Rush Green Stadium; Attendance: 562; Referee: Helen Conley

2 December 2018 10	Brighton & Hove Albion	0–1	West Ham United	Crawley
14:00	Green (yellow card) 79'; L. Rafferty (yellow card) 90+2'	Report	Ross 64'; Visalli (yellow card) 72'	Stadium: Broadfield Stadium; Attendance: 376; Referee: Kirsty Dowle

9 December 2018 11	Yeovil Town	0–5	West Ham United	Dorchester
15:00		Report	Lehmann 19', 27'; Simic 34', 59'; Visalli 53'	Stadium: The Avenue Stadium; Attendance: 516; Referee: Matthew Russell

6 January 2019 12	West Ham United	2–4	Arsenal	Romford
12:30	Ross 11', 43'; Lehmann (yellow card) 77'	Report	Williamson 26'; Arnth 31'; van de Donk 59', 65', (yellow card) 77'	Stadium: Rush Green Stadium; Attendance: 913; Referee: Will Finnie

13 January 2019 13	West Ham United	1–3	Manchester City	Romford
15:00	Ross 58'	Report	Weir 15'; Hemp 39'; Parris 86'; Beckie (yellow card) 90+2'	Stadium: Rush Green Stadium; Attendance: 640; Referee: Jason Richardson

28 January 2019 14	Liverpool	1–0	West Ham United	Birkenhead
19:00	Sweetman-Kirk 49'	Report	Flaherty (yellow card) 52'; Longhurst (yellow card) 78'	Stadium: Prenton Park; Attendance: 186; Referee: Rebecca Welch

20 February 2019 15	Reading	1–2	West Ham United	Reading
19:30	Williams 66' (pen.); Allen (yellow card) 82'	Report	Lehmann 20', 53'	Stadium: Madejski Stadium; Attendance: 2,148; Referee: Rebecca Welch

13 March 2019 16	West Ham United	0–1	Everton	Romford
19:45		Report	Cain 88'; Levell (yellow card) 90+7'	Stadium: Rush Green Stadium; Attendance: 607; Referee: Dean Skipper

31 March 2019 17	Chelsea	1–1	West Ham United	Kingston upon Thames
14:00	Carter (yellow card) 15'; England 42'	Report	Reichardt (yellow card) 35'; Flaherty 65'	Stadium: Kingsmeadow; Attendance: 2,854; Referee: Stacey Pearson

21 April 2019 18	West Ham United	1–2	Birmingham City	Romford
15:00	Leon 27'; Moorhouse (red card) 41'; Longhurst (yellow card) 45+3'	Report	Ladd (yellow card) 31', (goal) 44'; Arthur 75'	Stadium: Rush Green Stadium; Attendance: 706; Referee: Rob Whitton

28 April 2019 19	Bristol City	1–2	West Ham United	Filton
15:00	Rafferty 60' (o.g.)	Report	Kiernan 74'; Ross 89'	Stadium: Stoke Gifford Stadium; Attendance: 602; Referee: Richard Hulme

11 May 2019 20	West Ham United	0–4	Brighton & Hove Albion	Romford
12:30	Reichardt (yellow card) 44'	Report	Green 21', (yellow card) 67'; Connolly 39'; Nildén 79'; Brazil 90+3'	Stadium: Rush Green Stadium; Attendance: 1,412; Referee: Stacey Pearson

=== League table ===
Pos	Team	Pld	W	D	L	GF	GA	GD	Pts
5	Reading	20	8	3	9	33	30	+3	27
6	Bristol City	20	7	4	9	17	34	−17	25
7	West Ham United	20	7	2	11	25	37	−12	23
8	Liverpool	20	7	1	12	21	38	−17	22
9	Brighton & Hove Albion	20	4	4	12	16	38	−22	16

Source: FA WSL
Rules for classification: 1) Points; 2) Goal difference; 3) Number of goals scored

== Women's FA Cup ==
3 February 2019 Fourth round	West Ham United	3–1	Blackburn Rovers	Romford
13:00	Leon 44', 79'; Visalli 72'	Report	Flint 14'	Stadium: Rush Green Stadium

17 February 2019 Fifth round	West Ham United	8–1	Huddersfield Town	Romford
14:00	Longhurst 22'; Kiernan 27', 81', 84'; Lehmann 37'; Ross 38'; Kmita 65'; Visalli 71'	Report	Mallin 14' (pen.)	Stadium: Rush Green Stadium; Attendance: 865

17 March 2019 Quarter-finals	Aston Villa	0–1	West Ham United	Boldmere
14:00		Report	Ross 26'	Stadium: Trevor Brown Memorial Ground; Attendance: 609

14 April 2019 Semi-final	Reading	1–1 (a.e.t.) (3–4 p)	West Ham United	High Wycombe
12:30	Furness 48'; Potter (yellow card) 66'; Harding (yellow card) 79'; Moore (yellow card) 88'; Bruton (yellow card) 99'	Report	Lehmann 56'; Flaherty (yellow card) 69'; Cho (yellow card) 75'; Simon (yellow card) 90+5'	Stadium: Adams Park
	Penalties
	Davison (penalty scored); Hönnudóttir (penalty missed); Bruton (penalty missed); Furness (penalty scored); Allen (penalty scored); Moore (penalty missed)		(penalty scored) Ross; (penalty missed) Visalli; (penalty scored) Leon; (penalty missed) Longhurst; (penalty scored) Flaherty; (penalty scored) Cho

4 May 2019 Final	Manchester City	3–0	West Ham United	London
17:30	Walsh 52'; Scott (yellow card) 59'; Stanway 81'; Hemp 88'	Report		Stadium: Wembley Stadium; Attendance: 43,264; Referee: Abigail Byrne

== FA Women's League Cup ==
=== Group stage ===
19 August 2018 Group stage	Arsenal	3–1	West Ham United	Borehamwood
14:00	McCabe 12', 80'; Mitchell 44'	Report	Visalli 48'	Stadium: Meadow Park; Attendance: Stephen Bates; Referee: 834

26 August 2018 Group stage	West Ham United	4–1	Lewes	Romford
15:00	Ross 25', 49' (pen.); Kiernan 29'; Simic 32'	Report	Lane 8'	Stadium: Rush Green Stadium; Attendance: 255; Referee: Jamie Pope

16 September 2018 Group stage	West Ham United	4–0	Millwall Lionesses	Romford
15:00	de Graaf 6', 82'; Visalli 9'; Kmita 12'	Report		Stadium: Rush Green Stadium; Attendance: 557; Referee: Tom Bishop

12 December 2018 Group stage	Charlton Athletic	0–2	West Ham United	Crayford
19:45		Report	Kmita 46'; Lehmann 56'	Stadium: The Oakwood; Attendance: 202; Referee: Gerry Heron

Pos	Team	Pld	W	WPEN	LPEN	L	GF	GA	GD	Pts	Qualification	ARS	WHU	LEW	CHA	MIL
1	Arsenal	4	4	0	0	0	20	2	+18	12	Advance to knock-out stage	—	3–1	—	5–0	—
2	West Ham United	4	3	0	0	1	11	4	+7	9	Advance to knock-out stage	—	—	4–1	—	4–0
3	Lewes	4	2	0	0	2	8	13	−5	6		0–9	—	—	5–0	—
4	Charlton Athletic	4	1	0	0	3	4	14	−10	3		—	0–2	—	—	4–2
5	Millwall Lionesses	4	0	0	0	4	3	13	−10	0		1–3	—	0–2	—	—

Source: thefa.com
Rules for classification: 1) Points; 2) Goal difference; 3) Number of goals scored

=== Knockout phase ===
9 January 2019 Quarter-final	Manchester United	2–0	West Ham United	Leigh
19:00	Longhurst 17' (o.g.); Sigsworth 53'; Zelem (yellow card) 90+1'	Report	Hendrix (yellow card) 24'; Longhurst (yellow card) 53'; Percival (yellow card) 81'	Stadium: Leigh Sports Village; Attendance: 1,029; Referee: Leigh Doughty

== Squad statistics ==
=== Appearances ===
Starting appearances are listed first, followed by substitute appearances after the + symbol where applicable.

No.	Pos	Nat	Player	Total		FA WSL		FA Cup		League Cup	
No.	Pos	Nat	Player	Apps	Goals	Apps	Goals	Apps	Goals	Apps	Goals
1	GK	(England) ENG	Becky Spencer	16	0	10+2	0	0	0	4	0
2	DF	(New Zealand) NZL	Ria Percival	25	0	15+1	0	4	0	5	0
3	DF	(United States) USA	Erin Simon	23	0	16+1	0	5	0	0+1	0
4	DF	(United States) USA	Brooke Hendrix	23	0	13+1	0	4	0	5	0
5	DF	(England) ENG	Gilly Flaherty	29	1	19	1	5	0	5	0
6	MF	(Netherlands) NED	Tessel Middag	0	0	0	0	0	0	0	0
7	FW	(Switzerland) SUI	Alisha Lehmann	30	9	20	6	5	2	5	1
8	FW	(Republic of Ireland) IRL	Leanne Kiernan	22	6	10+5	2	3+2	3	2	1
9	FW	(Scotland) SCO	Jane Ross	30	11	18+2	7	5	2	5	2
10	MF	(Germany) GER	Julia Simic	15	3	11	2	0	0	3+1	1
11	DF	(England) ENG	Claire Rafferty	22	1	11+2	1	3+1	0	4+1	0
12	MF	(England) ENG	Kate Longhurst	29	3	17+2	2	5	1	5	0
13	GK	(England) ENG	Anna Moorhouse	16	0	10	0	5	0	1	0
14	DF	(England) ENG	Vyan Sampson	19	0	6+6	0	0+3	0	1+3	0
15	MF	(United States) USA	Brianna Visalli	30	5	16+4	1	1+4	2	5	2
16	FW	(England) ENG	Rosie Kmita	20	4	1+13	1	0+3	1	2+1	2
17	FW	(Netherlands) NED	Esmee de Graaf	14	3	7+3	1	0	0	3+1	2
18	MF	(Netherlands) NED	Lucienne Reichardt	21	0	10+2	0	2+2	0	4+1	0
19	FW	(Canada) CAN	Adriana Leon	10	3	4+2	1	3+1	2	0	0
20	MF	(South Korea) KOR	Cho So-hyun	12	0	6+1	0	5	0	0	0

=== Goalscorers ===
Rank	No.	Pos.	Name	FA WSL	FA Cup	League Cup	Total
1	9	FW	(Scotland) Jane Ross	7	2	2	11
2	7	FW	(Switzerland) Alisha Lehmann	6	2	1	9
3	8	FW	(Republic of Ireland) Leanne Kiernan	2	3	1	6
4	15	MF	(United States) Brianna Visalli	1	2	2	5
5	16	FW	(England) Rosie Kmita	1	1	2	4
6	10	MF	(Germany) Julia Simic	2	0	1	3
6	12	MF	(England) Kate Longhurst	2	1	0	3
6	17	MF	(Netherlands) Esmee de Graaf	1	0	2	3
6	19	FW	(Canada) Adriana Leon	1	2	0	3
10	5	DF	(England) Gilly Flaherty	1	0	0	1
10	11	DF	(England) Claire Rafferty	1	0	0	1
Total				25	13	11	49

== Transfers ==
=== Transfers in ===
Date	Position	Nationality	Name	From	Ref.
13 June 2018	GK	(England)	Becky Spencer	(England) Chelsea	
15 June 2018	DF	(England)	Claire Rafferty	(England) Chelsea	
20 June 2018	MF	(United States)	Brianna Visalli	(United States) Chicago Red Stars	
25 June 2018	DF	(England)	Gilly Flaherty	(England) Chelsea	
5 July 2018	FW	(Netherlands)	Esmee de Graaf	(Netherlands) PEC Zwolle	
5 July 2018	MF	(Netherlands)	Lucienne Reichardt	(Netherlands) Ajax	
6 July 2018	GK	(England)	Anna Moorhouse	(England) Arsenal	
9 July 2018	FW	(Scotland)	Jane Ross	(England) Manchester City	
14 July 2018	MF	(Netherlands)	Tessel Middag	(England) Manchester City	
18 July 2018	FW	(Republic of Ireland)	Leanne Kiernan	(Republic of Ireland) Shelbourne	
19 July 2018	DF	(United States)	Brooke Hendrix	(Italy) Brescia	
20 July 2018	MF	(Germany)	Julia Simic	(Germany) Freiburg	
3 August 2018	DF	(New Zealand)	Ria Percival	(Switzerland) FC Basel	
6 August 2018	FW	(Switzerland)	Alisha Lehmann	(Switzerland) Young Boys	
9 August 2018	MF	(England)	Kate Longhurst	(England) Liverpool	
14 September 2018	DF	(United States)	Erin Simon	(United States) Sky Blue FC	
12 January 2019	FW	(Canada)	Adriana Leon	(United States) Seattle Reign	
13 January 2019	MF	(South Korea)	Cho So-hyun	(Norway) Avaldsnes IL	
