= 2019 Women's FA Cup final =

English football cup final

- Match programme cover
- Event: 2018–19 Women's FA Cup
Manchester City	West Ham United
3	0
- Date: 4 May 2019
- Venue: Wembley Stadium, London
- Player of the Match: Georgia Stanway (Manchester City)
- Referee: Abigail Byrne (Suffolk)
- Attendance: 43,264

The 2019 Women's FA Cup final (known as the SSE Women's FA Cup Final for sponsorship reasons) was the 49th final of the Women's FA Cup, England's primary cup competition for women's football teams. The showpiece event was the 26th to be played directly under the auspices of the Football Association (FA).

The final was contested between Manchester City and West Ham United on 4 May 2019 at Wembley in London. It was Manchester City's second appearance in the final of the Women's FA Cup having won the 2017 final. It was the first FA Cup final for West Ham United and also their first appearance at the national stadium.

Manchester City won the game with three second-half goals from Keira Walsh, Georgia Stanway and Lauren Hemp to record their second Women's FA Cup victory in three seasons. The result meant that City went through the entire FA Cup campaign without conceding a goal, and completed their first domestic cup double. As their men's counterpart won the 2018–19 FA Cup, Manchester City became the fourth club, after Southampton, Arsenal, and Chelsea, to win both the men's and women's FA Cup in the same season.

== Route to the final ==
Round	Opposition	Score
4th	Watford (H)	3–0
5th	Tottenham Hotspur (A)	3–0
QF	Liverpool (H)	3–0
SF	Chelsea (H)	1–0
Key: (H) = Home venue; (A) = Away venue.

=== Manchester City ===
Manchester City were one of 22 WSL and Championship teams to enter the competition in the fourth round proper and were drawn against National League team Watford. Substitute Nikita Parris finally broke the deadlock in the 62nd minute, the first of her two goals on the day as City won 3–0. City traveled to Championship side Tottenham Hotspur for the fifth round, securing a second consecutive 3–0 victory in the competition before repeating the result once again in the quarter-finals, this time against WSL opposition as Georgia Stanway scored a second half brace following Janine Beckie's opener against Liverpool to secure Manchester City a semi-final place for the fourth season in a row. Manchester City were drawn against familiar opposition for the semi-final in Chelsea: it was the fifth time in six seasons the teams had met in the FA Cup, with the previous three also occurring at the semi-final stage. Chelsea had emerged victorious on all four of the previous occasions including the previous season on the way to winning the trophy. Despite controlling the game and creating more chances, a freak own goal by Magdalena Eriksson in the 90+2nd minute knocked the defending champions out by a scoreline of 1–0 meaning City had also successfully negotiated all four rounds without conceding a goal.

Round	Opposition	Score
4th	Blackburn Rovers (H)	3–1
5th	Huddersfield Town (H)	8–1
QF	Aston Villa (A)	1–0
SF	Reading (A)	(p) 1–1
Key: (H) = Home venue; (A) = Away venue.

=== West Ham United ===
West Ham United were one of 22 WSL and Championship teams to enter the competition in the fourth round proper and were drawn against National League team Blackburn Rovers. The third division team took the lead through Natasha Flint before the Hammers equalised on the stroke of half-time through Adriana Leon. Brianna Visalli put West Ham ahead after the break before Canadian international Leon scored her second goal of the game to secure a 3–1 victory. For the fifth round, West Ham were drawn at home to third division opposition for the second consecutive time in Huddersfield Town. The visitors once again took the lead as captain Kate Mallin buried a 14th minute penalty into the top corner but Alisha Lehmann leveled eight minutes later. By half-time, West Ham were leading 4–1 and scored another four in the second half including a hat-trick by Leanne Kiernan to eventually win out emphatic 8–1 victors. Jane Ross scored the only goal of a 1–0 quarter-final win over Championship side Aston Villa to send West Ham through to the team's semi–final appearance. With only WSL teams left in the final four, West Ham finally met first division opposition for the first time in the competition as they traveled to Reading in the semi-finals. After a goalless first half, Rachel Furness put the home side ahead in the 49th minute. Just like in the fifth round, West Ham found an equaliser through Alisha Lehmann eight minutes later. With the teams locked at 1–1 after extra-time, the tie was eventually settled in a penalty shoot-out. 3–3 after five penalties each, the shoot-out entered sudden death: Anna Moorhouse saved Reading captain Jade Moore's weak attempt before South Korean international Cho So-hyun stepped up and stroked the ball into the top corner to book the Hammers' place at Wembley. The latter portion of West Ham's FA Cup run featured heavily in the BBC behind-the-scenes documentary Britain's Youngest Football Boss.

== Pre-match ==
West Ham asked the Premier League that their men's fixture against Southampton at the London Stadium be moved from a 15:00 kick-off to 12:30 so fans attending that match could also make it to Wembley to watch the final. The request was denied by the Premier League.

== Match details ==
4 May 2019
17:30 BST

Manchester City	3–0	West Ham United
Walsh 52'; Stanway 81'; Hemp 88'	Report

Wembley Stadium, London
Attendance: 43,264
Referee: Abigail Byrne (Suffolk)

Manchester City	West Ham United

GK	1	(England) Karen Bardsley
RB	23	(England) Abbie McManus
CB	6	(England) Steph Houghton (c)
CB	5	(Scotland) Jen Beattie
LB	3	(England) Demi Stokes
CM	8	(England) Jill Scott	(yellow card) 59'
CM	24	(England) Keira Walsh
CM	19	(Scotland) Caroline Weir		(substituted off) 85'
FW	25	(Belgium) Tessa Wullaert
FW	17	(England) Nikita Parris		(substituted off) 82'
FW	12	(England) Georgia Stanway
Substitutes:
GK	26	(England) Ellie Roebuck
DF	4	(England) Gemma Bonner
FW	11	(Canada) Janine Beckie
FW	15	(England) Lauren Hemp		(substituted on) 82'
DF	20	(Republic of Ireland) Megan Campbell
FW	22	(Scotland) Claire Emslie		(substituted on) 85'
Manager:
(England) Nick Cushing

GK	13	(England) Anna Moorhouse
RB	3	(United States) Erin Simon	(substituted off) 89'
CB	5	(England) Gilly Flaherty (c)
CB	4	(United States) Brooke Hendrix
LB	11	(England) Claire Rafferty	(substituted off) 62'
CM	2	(New Zealand) Ria Percival
CM	20	(South Korea) Cho So-hyun
CM	12	(England) Kate Longhurst
FW	19	(Canada) Adriana Leon
FW	9	(Scotland) Jane Ross	(substituted off) 65'
FW	7	(Switzerland) Alisha Lehmann
Substitutes:
GK	1	(Jamaica) Rebecca Spencer
FW	8	(Republic of Ireland) Leanne Kiernan	(substituted on) 65'
DF	14	(England) Vyan Sampson
MF	15	(United States) Brianna Visalli	(substituted on) 62'
FW	16	(England) Rosie Kmita	(substituted on) 89'
MF	18	(Netherlands) Lucienne Reichardt
Manager:
(England) Matt Beard

Player of the match
Georgia Stanway (Manchester City)

Assistant referees:
Sian Massey-Ellis (Birmingham)
Melissa Burgin (Birmingham)
Fourth official:
Lisa Benn (Berks & Bucks)

Match rules

- 90 minutes.
- 30 minutes of extra-time if necessary.
- Penalty shoot-out if scores still level.
- Five named substitutes.
- Maximum of three substitutions.
