= Anna Moorhouse =

English footballer (born 1995)

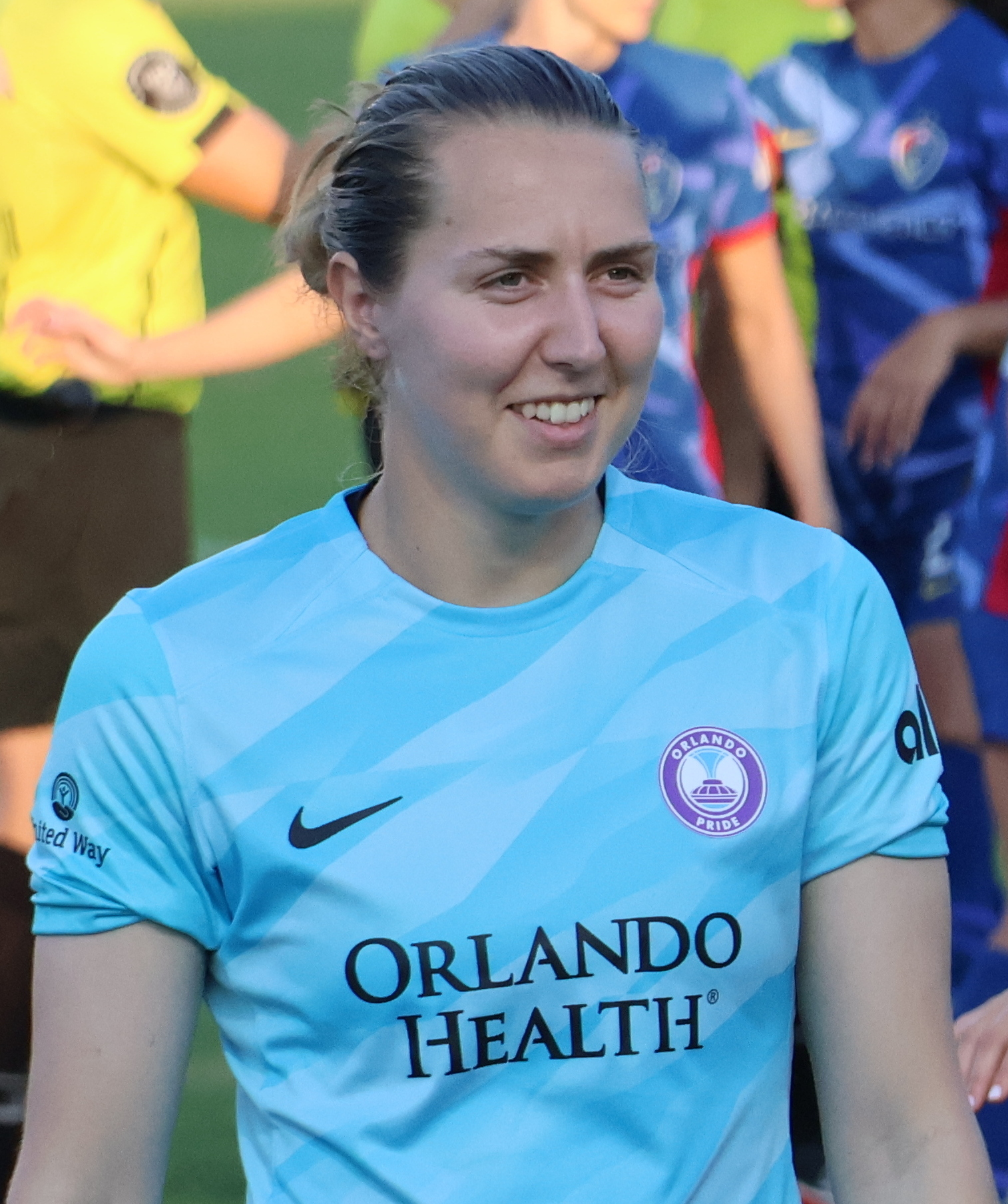
- Moorhouse with the Orlando Pride in 2024

Personal information
- Full name: Anna Victoria Moorhouse
- Date of birth: 30 March 1995 (age 31)
- Place of birth: Oldham, England
- Height: 6 ft 1 in (1.85 m)
- Position: Goalkeeper

Team information
- Current team: Manchester City (on loan from Orlando Pride)
- Number: 14

Youth career
- Oldham Athletic
- 2011–2012: Manchester United

Senior career*
Years	Team	Apps	(Gls)
2012–2013	Everton	0	(0)
2014–2015	Durham	9	(0)
2016–2017	Doncaster Rovers Belles	4	(0)
2017–2018	Arsenal	5	(0)
2018–2020	West Ham United	14	(0)
2020–2022	Bordeaux	24	(0)
2022–	Orlando Pride	97	(0)
2026–	→ Manchester City (loan)	0	(0)

International career^{‡}
2025–	England	2	(0)
Medal record
Women's football
Representing England
UEFA Women's Championship
Winner	2025 Switzerland
- * Club domestic league appearances and goals as of 22:46, 31 August 2026 (UTC) ‡ National team caps and goals as of 2 December 2025

Anna Victoria Moorhouse (born 30 March 1995) is an English professional footballer who plays as a goalkeeper for Women's Super League club Manchester City, on loan from Orlando Pride of the National Women's Soccer League (NWSL), and the England national team.

== Early life ==
Moorhouse was born in Oldham, Greater Manchester.

She attended Hulme Grammar School.

== Youth career ==
At the age of 11, Moorhouse joined the Chadderton Grasshoppers boys' team where she spent three years before no longer being allowed to play on a boys' team. She switched to Chaddy End girls team, and also represented Oldham Athletic.

In 2011, age 16, Moorhouse was scouted by Manchester United and spent a year with the team's Regional Talent Club. It was also at 16 that she began playing in goal.

== Club career ==
=== Everton ===
Due to Manchester United's lack of a senior women's team, Moorhouse moved to Everton to begin her senior career in 2012. She did not make an appearance for Everton in her two seasons at the club, ranking behind Rachel Brown and Danielle Hill, with Lizzie Durack and Megan Walsh joining in her second season.

=== Durham ===
In 2014, Moorhouse joined newly formed WSL 2 club Durham. She spent two seasons with the club, making a total of 15 appearances.

=== Doncaster Rovers Belles ===
In 2016, Moorhouse made the jump up to the WSL 1 with Doncaster Rovers Belles. She made four appearances including on the last day of the 2016 season when already-relegated Doncaster, having lost all 15 of their league games, beat Reading 1–0.

=== Arsenal ===
Ahead of the 2017 FA WSL Spring Series, Moorhouse signed with Arsenal. She made her debut on 20 May 2017, in the final game of the Spring Series, a 4–2 victory over Birmingham City.

During the 2017–18 season, she made four league appearances behind Sari van Veenendaal but was used more consistently in the early stages of both the FA Cup and League Cup. Arsenal reached the final of both competitions, with Moorhouse an unused substitute. Arsenal won the League Cup but lost the FA Cup.

=== West Ham United ===
In July 2018, Moorhouse left Arsenal to join newly promoted FA WSL team West Ham United. She split playing time with Rebecca Spencer, each making 10 league starts. Moorhouse was named the starter in all five FA Cup games as the team reached the final for the first time before losing 3–0 to Manchester City at Wembley Stadium.

Although Spencer left West Ham ahead of the 2019–20 season, Moorhouse fell into a backup role behind summer recruit Courtney Brosnan, playing just four league games and a further four League Cup games before leaving upon the expiration of her contract.

=== Bordeaux ===
In June 2020, Moorhouse signed as a free agent with French Division 1 Féminine team Bordeaux. The move reunited her with former Arsenal coach Pedro Martínez Losa. She was the club's first choice keeper, playing in 20 of 22 league games. She conceded 15 goals and kept 10 clean sheets as Bordeaux finished third in the league, and qualified for the UEFA Women's Champions League for the first time in the club's history.

In their debut Champions League campaign, Bordeaux beat Czech team Slovácko and Swedish team Kristianstads DFF in the first qualifying round before being knocked out by Wolfsburg on penalties. Moorhouse was substituted off at halftime and did not play in the shootout.

During the 2021–22 season, Moorhouse became backup keeper behind summer recruit Mylène Chavas before leaving in January 2022, citing frustrations with changes in Bordeaux's style of play following the appointment of Patrice Lair.

=== Orlando Pride ===
In January 2022, Moorhouse signed with NWSL team Orlando Pride ahead of the 2022 season. Orlando used allocation money to sign Moorhouse from Bordeaux having lost starter Ashlyn Harris in the offseason. She was second choice keeper behind Erin McLeod but made her debut on 30 March 2022, in a 1–0 defeat to Gotham FC in the 2022 NWSL Challenge Cup. Moorhouse started in the following two games, 4–1 and 4–2 defeats to Washington Spirit and North Carolina Courage, before being benched to allow Kaylie Collins to debut. In total, she made five appearances in her debut season, all defeats; she did not keep a clean sheet and conceded 13 goals.

When McLeod left following the 2022 season, Moorhouse became the team's starter. She made a club-record 12 saves in the Pride's season opener on 26 March 2023 against Portland Thorns FC, as Orlando lost 4–0 loss. After two defeats, new head coach Seb Hines started Collins in the third game before handing a club debut to offseason signing Carly Nelson in the Challenge Cup. After three games out, Moorhouse returned to the starting lineup in the team's first victory of the season, beating San Diego Wave FC. It marked her first playing win for the Pride. In her ninth appearance for the club, Moorhouse kept her first clean sheet for Orlando in a 1–0 win over Racing Louisville FC.

In January 2024, Moorhouse acquired a U.S. green card meaning she would no longer occupy an international roster spot.

During the 2024 season, Moorhouse played every regular season game and set a new NWSL record for clean sheets in a single season (13), beating Adrianna Franch's record of 11 set with Portland Thorns in 2017. The team won the NWSL Shield, and also set new records for an NWSL regular season unbeaten streak (24 matches), and most wins in an NWSL season (18).

In August 2025, Moorhouse signed an extension with the club, continuing her tenure until 2027.

==== Loan to Manchester City ====
On 3 September 2026, Moorhouse joined Manchester City on a short-term loan until January 2027.

== International career ==
In July 2024, Moorhouse received her first senior international call-up for England for Euro 2025 qualifying matches against the Republic of Ireland and Sweden. She did not feature in either matchday squad.

Moorhouse was recalled to the squad for the following international window, this time as an unused substitute for friendlies against Germany and South Africa.

On 5 June 2025, Moorhouse was named in England's squad for UEFA Euro 2025. She was an unused substitute as England successfully defended their European title.

On 29 November 2025, Moorhouse made her senior international debut in an 8–0 friendly victory against China. Following her debut, Moorhouse was awarded legacy number 239.

== Personal life ==
Moorhouse attended Liverpool Hope University between 2013 and 2016, earning a bachelor's in sports and exercise science.

Her partner is Orlando Pride teammate, midfielder Viviana Villacorta; they have a dog called Betty.

== Career statistics ==
=== Club ===
As of 29 August 2026

Appearances and goals by club, season and competition
Club	Season	League			National Cup (Note: FA Cup, Coupe de France)		League Cup (Note: FA Women's League Cup, NWSL Challenge Cup)		Continental		Other		Total	
Club	Season	Division	Apps	Goals	Apps	Goals	Apps	Goals	Apps	Goals	Apps	Goals	Apps	Goals
Everton	2012	WSL 1	0	0	0	0	0	0	—		—		0	0
Everton	2013	WSL 1	0	0	0	0	0	0	—		—		0	0
Everton	Total		0	0	0	0	0	0	0	0	0	0	0	0
Durham	2014	WSL 2	5	0	1	0	0	0	—		—		6	0
Durham	2015	WSL 2	4	0	0	0	5	0	—		—		9	0
Durham	Total		9	0	1	0	5	0	0	0	0	0	15	0
Doncaster Rovers Belles	2016	WSL 1	4	0	0	0	0	0	—		—		4	0
Arsenal	2017	WSL 1	1	0	—		—		—		—		1	0
Arsenal	2017–18	WSL 1	4	0	3	0	4	0	—		—		11	0
Arsenal	Total		5	0	3	0	4	0	0	0	0	0	12	0
West Ham United	2018–19	FA WSL	10	0	5	0	1	0	—		—		16	0
West Ham United	2019–20	FA WSL	4	0	0	0	4	0	—		—		8	0
West Ham United	Total		14	0	5	0	5	0	0	0	0	0	24	0
Bordeaux	2020–21	D1 Féminine	20	0	0	0	—		—		—		20	0
Bordeaux	2021–22	D1 Féminine	4	0	1	0	—		4	0	—		9	0
Bordeaux	Total		24	0	1	0	0	0	4	0	0	0	29	0
Orlando Pride	2022	NWSL	2	0	—		3	0	—		—		5	0
Orlando Pride	2023	NWSL	19	0	—		4	0	—		—		23	0
Orlando Pride	2024	NWSL	26	0	—		—		—		4 (Note: One appearance in NWSL x Liga MX Femenil Summer Cup; three appearances in NWSL Playoffs)	0	30	0
Orlando Pride	2025	NWSL	25	0	—		1	0	0	0	2 (Note: NWSL Playoffs)	0	28	0
Orlando Pride	2026	NWSL	20	0	—		0	0	0	0	—		20	0
Orlando Pride	Total		92	0	0	0	8	0	0	0	6	0	106	0
Career total			148	0	10	0	22	0	4	0	6	0	190	0

=== International ===
As of match played 2 December 2025

Appearances and goals by national team and year
National team	Year	Apps	Goals
England	2025	2	0
Total		2	0

== Honours ==
Arsenal

- FA Women's League Cup: 2017–18
- Women's FA Cup runner-up: 2017–18

West Ham United

- Women's FA Cup runner-up: 2018–19

Orlando Pride

- NWSL Shield: 2024
- NWSL Championship: 2024

England

- UEFA Women's Championship: 2025

Individual

- NWSL Best XI Second Team: 2024
