= Esmee de Graaf =

Dutch footballer (born 1997)

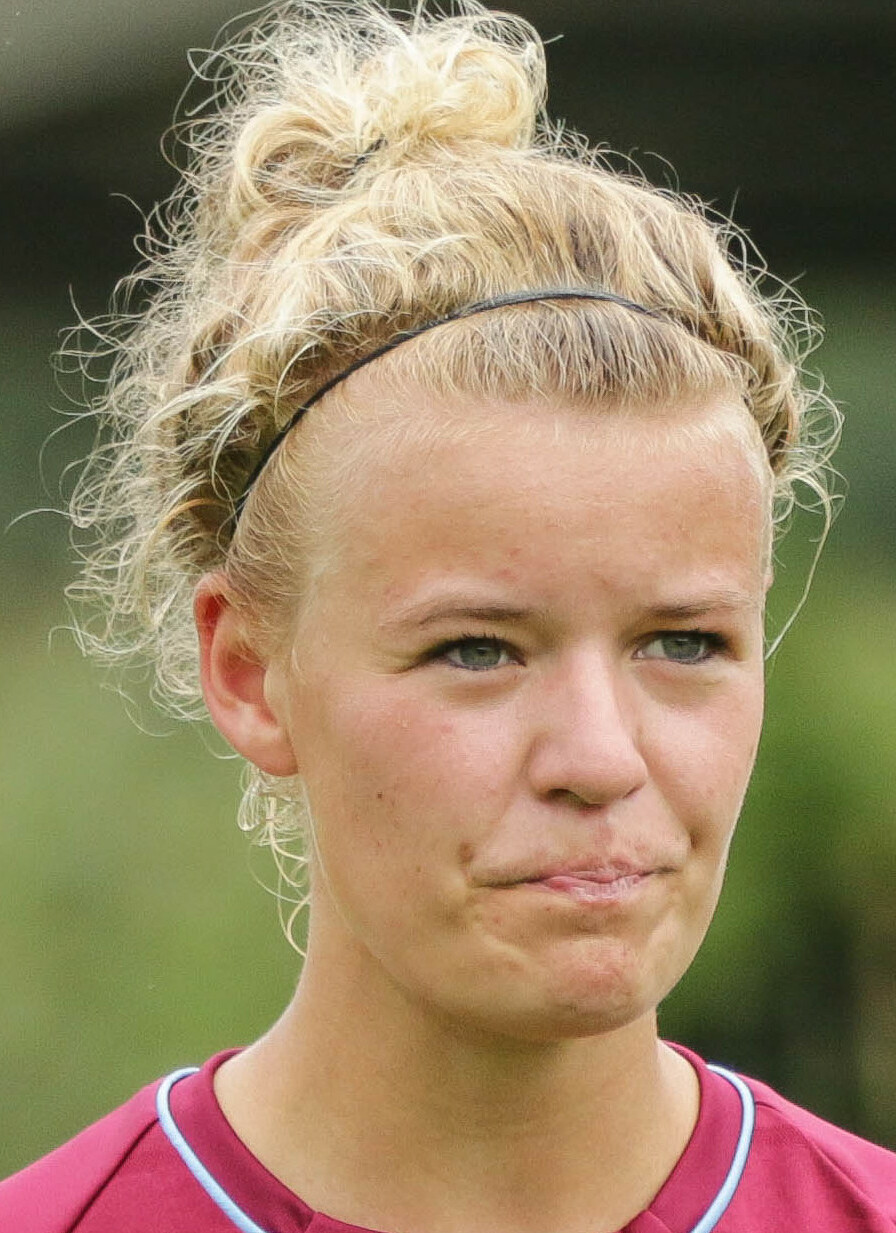
- De Graaf in 2018

Personal information
- Full name: Esmee de Graaf
- Date of birth: 2 August 1997 (age 29)
- Place of birth: Bunschoten-Spakenburg, Netherlands
- Positions: Forward; winger; full-back

Team information
- Current team: Feyenoord
- Number: 14

Youth career
- IJsselmeervogels
- 2013–2015: SV Saestum

Senior career*
Years	Team	Apps	(Gls)
2015–2018	PEC Zwolle	74	(21)
2018–2020	West Ham United	12	(1)
2020–2022	Leicester City	40	(1)
2022–	Feyenoord	60	(20)

International career
2013	Netherlands U16	5	(0)
2013–2014	Netherlands U17	5	(1)
2016	Netherlands U19	8	(2)
2020	Netherlands U23	1	(0)
2018	Netherlands	2	(0)
- * Club domestic league appearances and goals as of 17 May 2025

Esmee de Graaf (born 2 August 1997) is a Dutch professional footballer who plays as a forward, full-back or winger for Eredivise club Feyenoord.

== Club career ==
=== Early career and PEC Zwolle ===
De Graaf started her career senior career with PEC Zwolle in the Eredivisie of her native Netherlands having played for IJsselmeervogels and SV Saestum at junior level.

De Graaf finished her full debut season in 2015–16 as Zwolle's joint top-goalscorer with Judith Frijlink and went on to score 21 times in 74 league games during her time at club, eventually captaining the side and reaching the semi-finals of the 2016–17 KNVB Women's Cup.

=== West Ham and Leicester City ===
In July 2018 de Graaf transferred to West Ham United from PEC Zwolle. Having featured in 13 games and scoring 3 times in all competitions at the start of the 2018–19 season, de Graaf suffered an ACL injury that would rule her out long term, meaning she missed out on the club's run to the 2019 FA Women's Cup Final.

On 22 August 2020, de Graaf joined the newly professional FA Women's Championship side Leicester City on a free transfer. De Graaf ended her first season with Leicester having helped the side win the 2021–22 FA Women's Championship and promotion to the FA Women's Super League. On 23 May 2022, de Graaf departed Leicester City having achieved survival in the club's first top flight season, playing 53 games and scoring twice across her two years at the club.

=== Feyenoord ===
On 24 May 2022, it was announced that de Graaf would be joining Feyenoord in her home country on a two-year contract.

== International career ==
De Graaf won her first cap for the Netherlands in February 2018, appearing as a 73rd-minute substitute for Shanice van de Sanden in a 6–2 win over Japan at the 2018 Algarve Cup.

== Honours ==
Leicester City

- FA Women's Championship: 2021–22

Netherlands

- Algarve Cup: 2018
