= 2019 FA Cup =

2019 FA Cup may refer to:

- 2018–19 FA Cup
  - 2019 FA Cup final
- 2018–19 Women's FA Cup
  - 2019 Women's FA Cup final
- 2019–20 FA Cup
- 2019–20 Women's FA Cup
