= Joey, Joey, Joey =

Single by Peggy Lee

from the album Miss Wonderful
- A-side: "Joey, Joey, Joey" "They Can't Take That Away from Me"
- Released: 1956
- Label: Decca
- Songwriter: Frank Loesser

"Joey, Joey, Joey" is a song from Frank Loesser's musical The Most Happy Fella that was a hit for Peggy Lee in 1956.

The song was recorded almost simultaneously by her, Neal Hefti, the Lancers, Billy Eckstine, Merv Griffin.

== Critical reception ==
Professional ratings
Review scores
Source	Rating
Billboard	favorable

Billboard favorably reviewed Peggy Lee's recording (Decca 29877, coupled with "They Can't Take That Away from Me") in its issue from April 7, 1956.

== Track listing ==
45 rpm (Decca 9-29877)

45-L 8905
No.	Title	Writer(s)	Note(s)	Length
1.	"Joe sings Joey, Joey, Joey"	Frank Loesser	Excerpt from Act 1, Scene 1, of The Most Happy Fella; Peggy Lee; Vocal with orchestra directed by Sy Oliver	2:43

45-L 8903
No.	Title	Writer(s)	Note(s)	Length
1.	"They Can't Take That Away from Me"	George Gershwin; Ira Gershwin	Peggy Lee; Vocal with orchestra directed by Sy Oliver	2:54
