= Miss Wonderful =

Compilation album by Peggy Lee
- Released: 1959
- Recorded: January 16 and June 8, 1956
- Genre: Jazz
- Length: 35:01
- Label: Decca
- Producer: Milt Gabler

Peggy Lee chronology
Things Are Swingin' (1959)	Miss Wonderful (1959)	I Like Men! (1959)

Professional ratings
Review scores
Source	Rating
AllMusic	3/5 stars
Hi-Fi News & Record Review	A/H:1

Miss Wonderful is a 1959 album by Peggy Lee that was arranged and conducted by Sy Oliver.

== Track listing ==
1. "Mr. Wonderful" (George Weiss, Jerry Bock, Larry Holofcener) - 3:18
2. "They Can't Take That Away from Me" (George Gershwin, Ira Gershwin) - 2:56
3. "Where Flamingos Fly" (El Thea, Harold Courlander, John Benson Brooks) - 2:28
4. "You've Got to See Mamma Ev'ry Night (Or You Can't See Mamma at All)" (Con Conrad, Billy Rose) - 2:45
5. "The Come Back" (L.C. Fraser) - 3:01
6. "Take a Little Time to Smile" (Dave Barbour, Peggy Lee) - 2:36
7. "I Don't Know Enough About You" (Barbour, Lee) - 2:55
8. "Joey, Joey, Joey" (Frank Loesser) - 2:43
9. "Crazy in the Heart" (Alec Wilder, Bill Engvick) - 2:54
10. "You Oughtta Be Mine" (Curtis Lewis) - 3:05
11. "We Laughed at Love" (Charles Bourne, Sam Messenheimer) - 3:12
12. "That's Alright, Honey" (Charles Singleton, Rose Marie McCoy) - 3:08

== Personnel ==
- Peggy Lee - vocals
