= Sophie Hayden =

American actor

- Born: February 23, 1954 (age 71); Miami, Florida
- Education: Northwestern University
- Occupation: Actress

Sophie Hayden (born February 23, 1954, as Sophie Ann Schwab) is an American actress. She received a Tony Award nomination for Best Actress in a Musical and a Drama Desk Award nomination for Outstanding Actress in a Musical for her role as Rosabella in the Broadway theatre revival production of The Most Happy Fella in 1992.

== Life and career ==
Hayden was born on February 23, 1954, in Miami, Florida, to Sophie Schwab. She grew up in North Java, New York, and attended Attica Central High School. Hayden was crowned as world champion baton twirler in 1971. She attended Northwestern University and majored in acting. She moved back to New York in 1976.

In 1979, she performed in The King of Schnorrers on Broadway. She was an original cast member of Barnum on Broadway in 1980, and appeared in a production of The Comedy of Errors at Vivian Beaumont Theater in 1987. In 1991, she joined the revival production of The Most Happy Fella during its run in East Haddam, Connecticut, as Rosabella. The show delayed its transfer to Broadway until after Hayden, who was pregnant while it was staged in Connecticut, gave birth. It opened in January 1992, and closed in August 1992. For her performance, she was nominated for a Tony Award for Best Actress in a Musical and a Drama Desk Award for Outstanding Actress in a Musical. In 1997, Hayden portrayed Edith Frank in The Diary of Anne Frank, a stage adaptation of Diary of a Young Girl, at Music Box Theatre.

== Personal ==
Hayden married in 1980 and they have one child together. Shortly before starring in The Comedy of Errors, she changed her stage name to Sophie Hayden in honor of ballerina Melissa Hayden.

== Theatre credits ==
=== Broadway ===
Year	Title	Role	Theater	Ref.
1979	The King of Schnorrers			
1980	Barnum			
1987	The Comedy of Errors	Adriana	Vivian Beaumont Theater	
1992	The Most Happy Fella	Rosabella		
1992	The Show-Off	Amy	Criterion Center Stage Right	
1997	The Diary of Anne Frank	Edith Frank	Music Box Theatre	

=== Off-Broadway ===
Year	Title	Role	Theater	Ref.
1986	Lies My Father Told Me	Annie	Jewish Repertory Theater	
1996	Nine Armenians	Aunt Louise	City Center Stage I	
2002	In the Absence of Spring	Mama/Woman	McGinn/Cazale Theater	

== Awards and nominations ==
Year	Award	Category	Work	Result	Ref.
1992	Tony Awards	Best Performance by a Leading Actress in a Musical	The Most Happy Fella	Nominated	
1992	Drama Desk Award	Outstanding Actress in a Musical	The Most Happy Fella	Nominated	
