= Brianna Visalli =

American soccer player (born 1995)

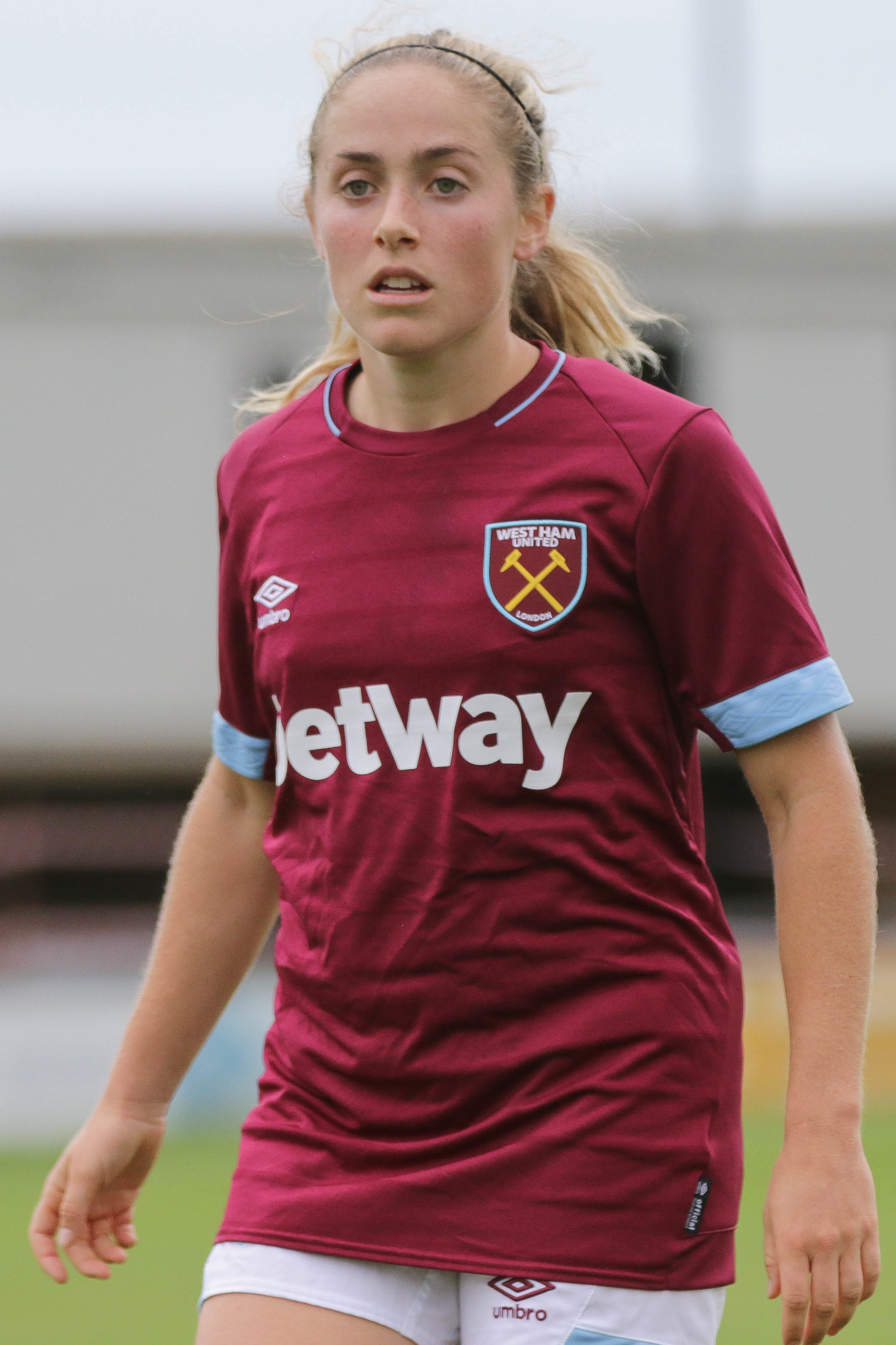
- Visalli with West Ham United in 2018

Personal information
- Full name: Brianna Elizabeth Visalli
- Date of birth: April 17, 1995 (age 31)
- Place of birth: San Jose, California, United States
- Height: 5 ft 2 in (1.57 m)
- Position: Midfielder

Team information
- Current team: Stanford (assistant coach)

Youth career
- CV Chilipeppers
- De Anza Force
- Valley Christian High School

College career
Years	Team	Apps	(Gls)
2014–2017	Pepperdine Waves	83	(26)

Senior career*
Years	Team	Apps	(Gls)
2018	Chicago Red Stars Reserves	4	(6)
2018–2019	West Ham United	20	(1)
2019–2020	Birmingham City	9	(0)
2020–2022	Houston Dash	35	(3)
2023	Brighton & Hove Albion	10	(0)
2023	AGF	11	(3)

International career
2018	United States U23	3	(0)
- * Club domestic league appearances and goals as of December 16, 2023

Brianna Elizabeth Visalli (born April 17, 1995) is an American former professional soccer player who is currently an assistant coach for the Stanford Cardinal women's soccer team. A midfielder in her playing career, she played college soccer for the Pepperdine Waves. She played professionally for English clubs West Ham United, Birmingham City, and Brighton & Hove Albion and for the Houston Dash of the National Women's Soccer League (NWSL). She represented the United States at under-23 level. She also holds British citizenship.

== Early life ==
Visalli was born in San Jose, California. She has five siblings. Her mother is a dual US/UK citizen. She played six years of her youth career for the CV Chilipeppers and one year for the De Anza Force. She was also a four-year varsity player for Valley Christian High School.

== College career ==
Visalli was a four-year starter for the Pepperdine Waves, starting all but two games, setting a record for number of games played (83) and started (81) by an outfield player. She finished her Waves career second in game-winning goals (14) and seventh in total goals (25). In her senior year she was a semi-finalist for the Mac Hermann Trophy and was named the West Coast Conference Player of the Year.

== Club career ==
=== Chicago Red Stars ===
After a college career at Pepperdine University, Visalli was drafted 19th in the 2018 NWSL College Draft by the Chicago Red Stars where she subsequently played for their reserve squad during their 2018 season.

=== West Ham United ===
Visalli signed for Women Super League club West Ham United in June 2018. She immediately became an integral part of the squad, appearing in 20 league matches and helping West Ham reach the 2018–19 FA Women's Cup final. She made a 62nd-minute substitute appearance in the Final at Wembley Stadium as Manchester City won 3–0. In June 2019, it was announced that Visalli would leave West Ham upon the expiration of her contract.

=== Birmingham City ===
In July 2019, Visalli joined Birmingham City. Visalli played in eight games for the Blues in 2019, captaining the side in their away fixture against Brighton & Hove Albion. She was ruled out of action until 2020 on December 5, 2019, after undergoing minor surgery for a medical condition. In total, Visalli made 13 appearances for Birmingham in all competitions before leaving as a free agent at the end of the season.

=== Houston Dash ===
In May 2020, Visalli signed a two-year contract with NWSL club Houston Dash ahead of the 2020 NWSL Challenge Cup.

Visalli made her club debut during the 2020 NWSL Challenge Cup, going on to win the tournament with the Dash. She would then make three appearances in the 2020 NWSL Fall Series. Visalli made twenty appearances in all competitions in 2021 and nineteen appearances in 2022. Out of contract at the end of 2022, Houston announced she would not return in 2023.

=== Brighton & Hove Albion ===
In 2023, she signed for Brighton & Hove Albion until the summer of 2024.

== International career ==
Visalli has previously represented the United States at the U-23 level on three occasions. As a dual citizen, through her English-born mother, Visalli is eligible to represent both the US and England at the senior level.

== Coaching career ==
Visalli was hired as an assistant coach to Paul Ratcliffe for the Stanford Cardinal women's soccer ahead of the 2024 season.

== Career statistics ==
=== Club ===
As of match played May 27, 2023.

Appearances and goals by club, season and competition
Club	Season	League			National cup (Note: includes Women's FA Cup)		League cup (Note: includes NWSL Challenge Cup, FA Women's League Cup)		Other (Note: includes Women's International Champions Cup)		Total	
Club	Season	Division	Apps	Goals	Apps	Goals	Apps	Goals	Apps	Goals	Apps	Goals
Chicago Red Stars Reserves	2018	WPSL	4	6	—		—		—		4	6
West Ham United	2018–19	WSL	20	1	3	1	5	2	—		28	4
Birmingham City	2019–20	WSL	9	0	2	0	2	0	—		13	0
Houston Dash	2020	NWSL	3	0	—		5	0	—		8	0
Houston Dash	2021	NWSL	16	2	—		4	0	1	0	21	2
Houston Dash	2022	NWSL	16	1	—		2	0	—		18	1
Houston Dash	Total		35	3	—		11	0	1	0	47	3
Brighton & Hove Albion	2022–23	WSL	10	0	4	3	1	0	—		15	3
Career total			78	10	9	4	19	2	1	0	107	16

== Honors ==
Houston Dash

- NWSL Challenge Cup: 2020
