= The Most Happy Fella =

1956 musical

- London studio cast recording
- Music: Frank Loesser
- Lyrics: Frank Loesser
- Book: Frank Loesser
- Basis: They Knew What They Wanted by Sidney Howard
- Productions: 1956 Broadway; 1959 Broadway revival 1960 West End; 1979 Broadway revival 1980 US television 1991 Goodspeed Opera House; 1991 Ahmanson Theatre; 1992 Broadway revival 2006 New York City Opera

The Most Happy Fella is a 1956 musical with a book, music, and lyrics by Frank Loesser. The story, about a romance between an older man and younger woman, is based on the 1924 play They Knew What They Wanted by Sidney Howard. The show is described by some theatre historians and critics as operatic. The original Broadway production ran for 14 months and it has enjoyed several revivals, including one staged by the New York City Opera.

It was broadcast in a live telecast of The Ed Sullivan Show on Sunday, October 28, 1956, the night of Elvis Presley's second appearance on that show. That broadcast was seen in some 168 stations in North America and garnered a 34.6 rating, a 57% share, with an estimated audience of 56.5 million viewers.

== Background and history ==
A friend of Frank Loesser's recommended the Howard play They Knew What They Wanted as material for a musical in 1952. After he read it, Loesser agreed it had musical potential, but decided to omit the political, labor, and religious material. It took him four years to complete the musical.

The Most Happy Fella frequently has been described as an opera, but some have qualified the term. In his book The World of Musical Comedy, Stanley Green noted that the musical is "one of the most ambitiously operatic works ever written for the Broadway theatre ... Loesser said 'I may give the impression this show has operatic tendencies. If people feel that way – fine. Actually all it has is a great frequency of songs. It's a musical with music.' " In an article in the Playbill Magazine for the original Broadway production, Loesser wrote, "What was left seemed to me to be a very warm simple love story, happy ending and all, and dying to be sung and danced." Brooks Atkinson, theatre critic (The New York Times), called it a "music drama", noting Loesser "has now come about as close to opera as the rules of Broadway permit." Composer, conductor, and musical theatre teacher Lehman Engel and critic/author Howard Kissel called it a "fresh musical (perhaps opera)". Music Theatre International describes the show: "Filled with sweeping ballads, intense dramatic arias and tuneful, splashy Broadway-style numbers, this ambitious "Broadway opera" has found a home on opera and musical-theatre stages alike."

A film version was planned in 1962, to be produced by Warner Bros. with Shirley Jones and Fred Astaire set to star. However, Jones was busy making The Music Man for Warner Bros., so she was dropped and Natalie Wood was brought in. Wood was also busy though, making Gypsy for Warner Bros.. Astaire downright refused to participate in the project, but came back to the studio to make Finian's Rainbow. The film never came to fruition. A revival of the film was discussed in the 1980s, but never got anywhere.

== Synopsis ==
Act 1

In the Golden Gate Restaurant in San Francisco in 1927, tired and harassed young waitress Cleo commiserates with her friend. Cleo's feet hurt ("Ooh My Feet") and her friend has had to fend off the cashier's advances ("I Know How It Is"). As they clean up ("Seven Million Crumbs"), Cleo's friend finds a jeweled tie pin and a note addressed to the friend as "Rosabella", written in odd broken English ("I Don't Know (The Letter)"). She decides to answer, thinking of the possibilities ("Somebody, Somewhere").

In Napa, the mailman has a letter for Tony Esposito, who has been enjoying a "mail order love affair" for the past four months. Tony, a large and hearty older Italian immigrant and a successful grape farmer, happily shows the crowd the picture of his "girlfriend" ("The Most Happy Fella"). Meek farmhand Herman expresses admiration of his boss's initiative in pursuing Rosabella ("Standing on the Corner"). But as Tony prepares to send his own picture in return, his sister Marie points out that he is too old and unattractive for a beautiful young woman like Rosabella, and he accepts that she is probably right. At that moment Joe, the young, handsome and nomadic farm foreman, arrives to tell Tony that he plans to leave town and travel somewhere else ("Joey, Joey, Joey"). Tony sees his opportunity and asks Joe for a photograph as a memento, then sends it as his own to his beloved ("Rosabella").

Several weeks later, Rosabella has agreed to come to Napa and marry Tony ("Abbondanza"), but as he prepares to leave for the bus station to collect her, imagining their future together ("Plenty Bambini"), he discovers to his horror that Joe has remained in town longer than planned to attend the wedding ("Spozalizio"). Rosabella arrives at the farm with the postman ("Special Delivery," "Benvenuta") and meets Joe ("Aren't You Glad?"), only to discover that he is not Tony. Upset at the subterfuge, she starts to leave. However, Tony has been injured in a truck accident en route to the bus station, and he pleads with Rosabella to stay and marry him immediately in case he does not live. She relents ("No Home, No Job") and they marry. Joe, who now must stay to run the ranch during Tony's convalescence, is upset but tries to comfort her ("Don't Cry"), and in a moment of mutual weakness they embrace.

Act 2

A week later ("Fresno Beauties"), Joe and Rosabella regret their indiscretion ("Cold and Dead"), and at the encouragement of Tony's doctor ("Love and Kindness"), the newlywed couple makes a fresh start ("Happy to Make Your Acquaintance"). Cleo arrives in Napa, revealing that Tony has sent for her and offered her a job to keep Rosabella company, and she immediately takes a dislike to Marie ("I Don't Like This Dame") but hits it off with fellow Texan Herman ("Big D"). As time passes, Tony and Rosabella grow closer, Marie feels increasingly lonely, and Joe longs to travel again ("How Beautiful the Days"). Marie tries to convince Tony that the age difference between him and Rosabella is too great ("Young People"), and he believes her even though Rosabella herself indicates otherwise ("Warm All Over"). Cleo and Herman also grow closer, though she is frustrated by his passive, compliant nature ("I Like Everybody"). She urges Rosabella to tell Tony of her feelings, as Tony is treating her like a child rather than a wife ("I Love Him/I Know How it Is"). Tony, overjoyed by Rosabella's expression of love ("Like a Woman Loves a Man"), discards his cane ("My Heart Is So Full of You"). Later Rosabella collapses at a party ("Hoedown"), and the doctor tells her she is pregnant (with Joe's child). She is upset by this news, and Cleo rushes her away before she can tell the still-overjoyed Tony ("Mamma, Mamma").

Act 3

In Tony's barn a short time later, Cleo hints to Herman that she may be leaving ("Goodbye, Darlin'") but he remains unbelievingly cheerful, to her frustration. As the preparations for the wedding party are taking place, the doctor asks the community to leave the couple alone for a little while ("Song of a Summer Night"). Rosabella tells Tony she is pregnant ("Please Let Me Tell You"). Tony rejects her in a rage when she reveals that Joe is the father. She and Cleo leave to return to San Francisco, but when Tony learns that Joe is leaving as well, he concludes that they are leaving together and rushes to the bus station with a gun to confront them. When he discovers that Joe has already left ("Tell Tony and Rosabella Goodbye for Me"), however, he resolves to forgive her ("She Gonna Come Home Wit' Me"). Marie begs her brother to let her go ("Nobody's Ever Gonna Love You") and snatches away his cane to prevent him from leaving, but Cleo attacks her and grabs it back. Brutish farmhand Pasquale intervenes in the struggle, and Herman finally finds the nerve to stand up for her by striking Pasquale ("I Made a Fist"). Tony convinces Rosabella to return to their home, where they will tell their friends and the townspeople Tony is the father. Reunited with Rosabella and soon to be a father, Tony affirms that he truly is "the most happy fella." ("Finale").

== Song list ==
Act I

- "Overture" – Orchestra
- "Ooh! My Feet!" – Cleo
- "I Know How It Is" – Cleo
- "The Letter" – Rosabella
- "Maybe He's Kind of Crazy" – Rosabella
- "Somebody, Somewhere" – Rosabella
- "The Most Happy Fella" – Tony and Company
- "The Letter Theme" – Marie and Tony
- "Standing on the Corner" – Herman, Jake, Clem and Al
- "Joey, Joey, Joey" – Joe
- "Soon You Gonna Leave Me, Joe" – Tony
- "Rosabella" – Tony
- "Abbondanza" – Pasquale, Giuseppe and Ciccio
- "Plenty Bambini" – Tony
- "Sposalizio" – Giuseppe, Ciccio, Pasquale and Company
- "Special Delivery!" – The Postman
- "Benvenuta" – Pasquale, Ciccio and Giuseppe
- "Aren't You Glad?" – Rosabella
- "No Home, No Job" – Rosabella
- "Eyes like a Stranger" – Marie
- "Don't Cry" – Joe

Act II

- "Prelude Act II"
- "Fresno Beauties" / "Cold and Dead" – Ensemble, Joe and Rosabella
- "Love and Kindness" – The Doctor
- "Happy to Make Your Acquaintance" – Tony, Rosabella and Cleo
- "I Don't Like This Dame" – Marie and Cleo
- "Big D" – Herman, Cleo and Ensemble
- "How Beautiful the Days" – Tony, Rosabella and Joe
- "Young People" – Marie, Tony and Ensemble
- "Warm All Over" – Rosabella
- "Old People" – Tony
- "I Like Everybody" – Herman and Cleo
- "I Love Him" / "I Know How It Is (Reprise)" – Rosabella and Cleo
- "Like a Woman Loves a Man" – Rosabella and Tony
- "My Heart Is So Full of You" – Tony and Rosabella
- "Hoedown" – Orchestra
- "Mamma, Mamma" – Tony

Act III

- "Prelude Act III"
- "Abbondanza (Reprise)" – Pasquale, Giuseppe and Ciccio
- "Goodbye, Darlin'" / "I Like Everybody (Reprise)" – Cleo and Herman
- "Song of a Summer Night" – The Doctor and Ensemble
- "Please Let Me Tell You" – Rosabella
- "Tell Tony and Rosabella Goodbye for Me" – Joe
- "She Gonna Come Home Wit' Me" – Tony
- "Nobody's Ever Gonna Love You" – Marie and Tony
- "I Made a Fist" – Cleo and Herman
- "Finale" – Tony, Rosabella and Ensemble

== Productions ==
=== Try-outs ===
The try-out of The Most Happy Fella opened in Boston on Tuesday, March 13, 1956, at the Shubert Theatre to good reviews. The show then moved to Philadelphia for a try-out at the Shubert Theatre, opening on Tuesday, April 10, 1956, also to good notices.

=== Original Broadway production ===
Directed by Joseph Anthony and choreographed by Dania Krupska, the original Broadway production was produced by Kermit Bloomgarden and Lynn Loesser and opened on May 3, 1956 at the Imperial Theatre, transferred to the Broadway Theatre on October 21, 1957 and closed on December 14, 1957 after 676 performances. The cast included Robert Weede as Tony, Jo Sullivan as Rosabella, Art Lund as Joey, Susan Johnson as Cleo, Shorty Long – the country and not the soul singer – as Herman and Mona Paulee as Marie. The future dancer and actress Zina Bethune appeared as Tessie, one of the children in the ensemble. The scenic and lighting design was by Jo Mielziner.

The original production was partially bankrolled by Lucille Ball and Desi Arnaz. (See "In Popular Culture", below.)

=== Subsequent productions ===
The New York City Center staged a limited run of 16 performances from February 10 through February 22, 1959. The cast included Norman Atkins as Tony, Paula Stewart as Rosabella, Libi Staiger as Cleo, Art Lund as Joe, Jack DeLeon as Herman, Muriel Birkhead as Marie, and Bernadette Peters as Tessie.

The West End production, directed by Jerome Eskow, opened at the London Coliseum on April 21, 1960, and ran for 288 performances. The cast included Inia Te Wiata as Tony, Helena Scott as Rosabella, Art Lund as Joey, Libi Staiger as Cleo, Jack De Leon as Herman, and Nina Verushka as Marie. Inia Te Wiata also starred in the Australian production, which played the Princess Theatre, Melbourne and the Palace Theatre, Sydney in 1961.

A Broadway revival began previews at the Majestic Theatre on September 20, 1979, officially opened on October 11, and closed on November 25, 1979, after 53 performances and 23 previews. Directed by Jack O'Brien, set design by Douglas W. Schmidt, costumes by Nancy Potts, lighting by Gilbert Vaughn Hemsley Jr., orchestrations by Don Walker, and choreographed by Graciela Daniele, it starred Giorgio Tozzi as Tony, Frederick Burchinal as Tony (Wed. and Sat. matinees), Sharon Daniels as Rosabella, Linda Michelle as Rosabella (Wed. and Sat. matinees), Adrienne Leonetti as Marie, Steven Alex-Cole as Max, Dennis Warning as Herman, Dean Badolato as Clem, David Miles as Jake, Kevin Wilson as Al, Stephen Dubov as Sheriff, Gene Varrone as Giuseppe, Darren Nimnicht as Pasquale, Tim Flavin as Busboy, Dan O'Sullivan as Postman, Franco Spoto as Ciccio, Richard White as Neighbor, Joe McGrath as Doctor, Lawrence Asher as Priest, Michael Capes as Bus Driver, Bill Hastings as Cashier/brakeman, Louisa Flaningam as Cleo, and Richard Muenz as Joe. The production was filmed and later broadcast by PBS' Great Performances in 1980. A 2-DVD set of this PBS performance was released in the 2000s.

A New York City Opera production ran from September 4 through October 18, 1991. Directed by Arthur Alan Seidelman, it starred Louis Quilico as Tony, Elizabeth Walsh as Rosabella, and Karen Ziemba as Cleo.

The Goodspeed Opera House presented the musical, directed by Gerald Gutierrez, in May and June 1991. This production had two pianos instead of a full orchestra, using a Loesser-approved piano arrangement by Robert Page. The production was then staged by the Center Theatre Group at the Ahmanson Theatre in Los Angeles for ten weeks starting in October 1991. In exchange for mounting the show, the Center Theatre Group shared in potential Broadway profits.

Based on the Goodspeed production, with most of the cast and creative team intact, a Broadway revival, produced by Lincoln Center Theater, began previews at the Booth Theatre on January 24, 1992, officially opened on February 13, and closed on August 30 after 229 performances. Again directed by Gerald Gutierrez, the cast included Spiro Malas as Tony, Sophie Hayden as Rosabella, Charles Pistone as Joe, Claudia Catania as Marie, Liz Larsen as Cleo, and Scott Waara as Herman.

The Ravinia Festival in Chicago presented a concert version with George Hearn as Tony and Rod Gilfry as Joe on July 20, 2007.

The New York City Opera presented a limited engagement with Paul Sorvino as Tony and Lisa Vroman as Rosabella between March 7–25, 2006.

In February 2013, Tulsa Opera presented a production directed by Dorothy Danner and conducted by Kostis Protopapas, featuring Chaim Joseph as Tony, Latrine Thurman as Rosabella, and Christopher Foeum as Joe.

In April 2014, New York City Center Encores! presented a well-received production directed by Casey Nicholaw and starring Shuler Hensley, Laura Benanti, Cheyenne Jackson, Heidi Blickenstaff, Jay Armstrong Johnson & Jessica Molaskey.

== Recordings ==
The original Broadway cast recording was produced by Goddard Lieberson for Columbia Records. The recording featured virtually the entire show, including all but a few lines of the dialogue, which was unusual for the time. Because the score was so extensive, the cast album had to be released as a three LP record set. Columbia also released a more conventional album of excerpted highlights. The original cast album was re-released on November 15, 1991 by Sony (ASIN: B0000027TC). The 1992 Broadway revival cast album was produced by RCA Victor Broadway (ASIN: B000003FBK) and released on June 9, 1992. Jay Records released a "complete" studio recording (CDJAY2 1306), including material that had been cut, on July 11, 2000. The recording was conducted by John Owen Edwards and featured Loesser's daughter Emily as Rosabella and Louis Quilico as Tony.

== Awards and nominations ==
=== Original Broadway production ===
Year	Award	Category	Nominee	Result
1957	Tony Award	Best Musical		Nominated
1957	Tony Award	Best Performance by a Leading Actor in a Musical	Robert Weede	Nominated
1957	Tony Award	Best Performance by a Featured Actress in a Musical	Jo Sullivan	Nominated
1957	Tony Award	Best Direction of a Musical	Joseph Anthony	Nominated
1957	Tony Award	Best Choreography	Dania Krupska	Nominated
1957	Tony Award	Best Conductor and Musical Director	Herbert Greene	Nominated
1957	Theatre World Award		Susan Johnson	Won
1957	New York Drama Critics' Circle Awards	Best Musical	Frank Loesser	Won

=== 1979 Broadway revival ===
Year	Award	Category	Nominee	Result
1980	Tony Award	Best Performance by a Leading Actor in a Musical	Giorgio Tozzi	Nominated
1980	Drama Desk Award	Outstanding Actor in a Musical	Giorgio Tozzi	Nominated

=== 1992 Broadway revival ===
Year	Award	Category	Nominee	Result
1992	Tony Award	Best Revival		Nominated
1992	Tony Award	Best Performance by a Leading Actress in a Musical	Sophie Hayden	Nominated
1992	Tony Award	Best Performance by a Featured Actor in a Musical	Scott Waara	Won
1992	Tony Award	Best Performance by a Featured Actress in a Musical	Liz Larsen	Nominated
1992	Drama Desk Award	Outstanding Revival		Nominated
1992	Drama Desk Award	Outstanding Actor in a Musical	Spiro Malas	Nominated
1992	Drama Desk Award	Outstanding Actress in a Musical	Sophie Hayden	Nominated
1992	Drama Desk Award	Outstanding Featured Actor in a Musical	Scott Waara	Won
1992	Drama Desk Award	Outstanding Featured Actress in a Musical	Liz Larsen	Nominated
1992	Drama Desk Award	Outstanding Director of a Musical	Gerald Gutierrez	Nominated
1992	Theatre World Award		Spiro Malas	Won

== In popular culture ==
John Sterling, radio announcer for the New York Yankees, refers to this musical in his "home run call" whenever Yankees third baseman Gio Urshela hits a home run. As Urshela circles the bases, Sterling says "Gio Urshela... a most happy fella!"

In 1957 the television show I Love Lucy (Season 6, episode 22) episode "Lucy’s Night In Town" featured the Ricardos and Mertzes traveling to New York City from their new country home in Connecticut to attend a sold-out evening performance of The Most Happy Fella. During dinner, they discover that Lucy had mistakenly purchased tickets for the matinee instead of the evening show. Desi Arnaz and Lucille Ball's Desilu Productions owned a large portion of the show, and was cross-promoting it in the episode. Three songs from the show - "Standing on the Corner", "Don't Cry" and "Big 'D' " - are heard in scenes where the characters are sitting in their box seats. Prior to entering the theater, Fred Mertz jokes that the musical's title is proof that "The guy (main character) is not married."
