= Leanne Kiernan =

Irish footballer (born 1999)

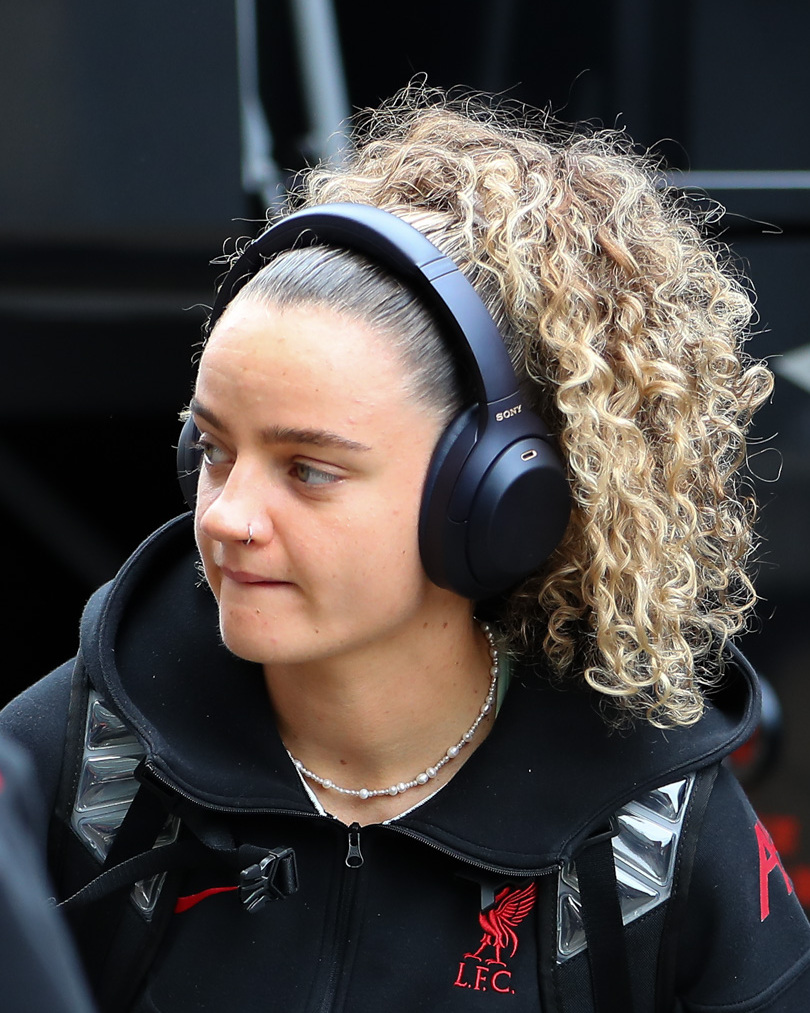
- Kiernan with Liverpool in 2024

Personal information
- Full name: Leanne Amy Kiernan
- Date of birth: 27 April 1999 (age 27)
- Place of birth: Bailieborough, Ireland
- Height: 5 ft 5 in (1.65 m)
- Position: Striker

Team information
- Current team: Newcastle United

Youth career
- Bailieboro Celtic
- Kingscourt Harps AFC

Senior career*
| Years | Team | Apps | (Gls) |
| 2015–2018 | Shelbourne | 32 | (34) |
| 2018–2021 | West Ham United | 31 | (3) |
| 2021–2026 | Liverpool | 59 | (20) |
| 2026 | → Nottingham Forest (loan) | 9 | (0) |
| 2026– | Newcastle United | 0 | (0) |

International career^{‡}
| 2016 | Republic of Ireland U17 | 5 | (3) |
| 2017 | Republic of Ireland U19 | 5 | (6) |
| 2018– | Republic of Ireland | 45 | (4) |
- * Club domestic league appearances and goals as of 6 June 2026 ‡ National team caps and goals as of 10 October 2026

Leanne Amy Kiernan (/ˈkɪərnən/; born 27 April 1999) is an Irish professional footballer who plays as a striker for Women's Super League 2 club Newcastle United and the Republic of Ireland national team.

== Early life ==
Born in Bailieborough in County Cavan, Kiernan attended Bailieborough Community School, where she played for the girls futsal team. She played with Bailieboro Celtic and, at the age of 12, with the boys' team at Kingscourt Harps, where she was spotted by FAI scout Mark Leavy and selected for their emerging talent programme. Outside of soccer, Kiernan had been an accomplished cross-country runner, winning the Ulster club juvenile cross-country championship four times with Shercock Athletic Club, and finishing fourth in the Irish U-13 cross-country championships in 2011. She also played Gaelic football for Cavan up to U-16 level. She lived with her family on a pig farm in Killinkere.

== Club career ==
=== Shelbourne ===
Kiernan joined Shelbourne at the age of 15. On 1 May 2016, she scored the winner for Shelbourne against UCD Waves in the WNL Cup final at Richmond Park. In the 2015–16 season, she scored 5 goals. In 2016, she scored 12 goals and was part of the "invincible" Shelbourne side that won the WNL without losing a single game. On 6 November 2016, she scored a hat-trick against Wexford Youths in the FAI Women's Cup final. In January 2017, she was named Young Player of the Year at 2016 Continental Tyres Women's National League Awards, earning a spot in the Team of the Year as well. The following week, she was also named Sportswoman of the Month for December 2016 by The Irish Times. On 22 August 2017, she made her UEFA Women's Champions League debut in a 0–0 draw with KKPK Medyk Konin. She finished the 2017 season with 9 goals. Kiernan began the 2018 season with 11 goals in her first six games – taking her total to 37 league goals in her three-and-a-half years with Shelbourne – before her departure in July.

=== West Ham United ===
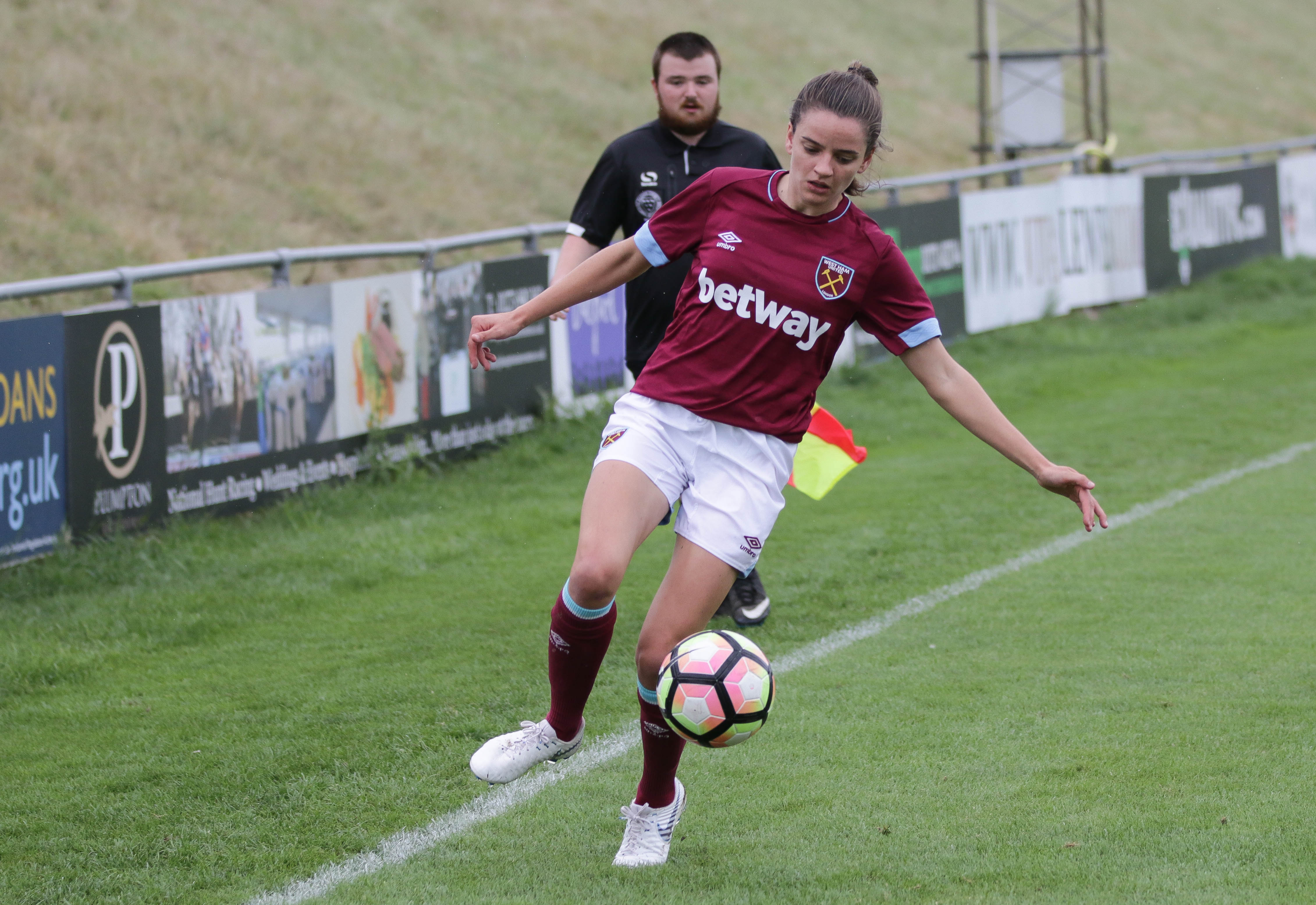
Kiernan playing for West Ham United against Lewes, August 2018

On 18 July 2018, Kiernan signed with West Ham United. On 19 August 2018, she made her debut in a 3–1 loss to Arsenal in the FA WSL Cup. On 26 August 2018, she scored her first goal in a 4–1 win over Lewes.

On 21 May 2021 Kiernan left West Ham following the expiry of her contract.

=== Liverpool ===
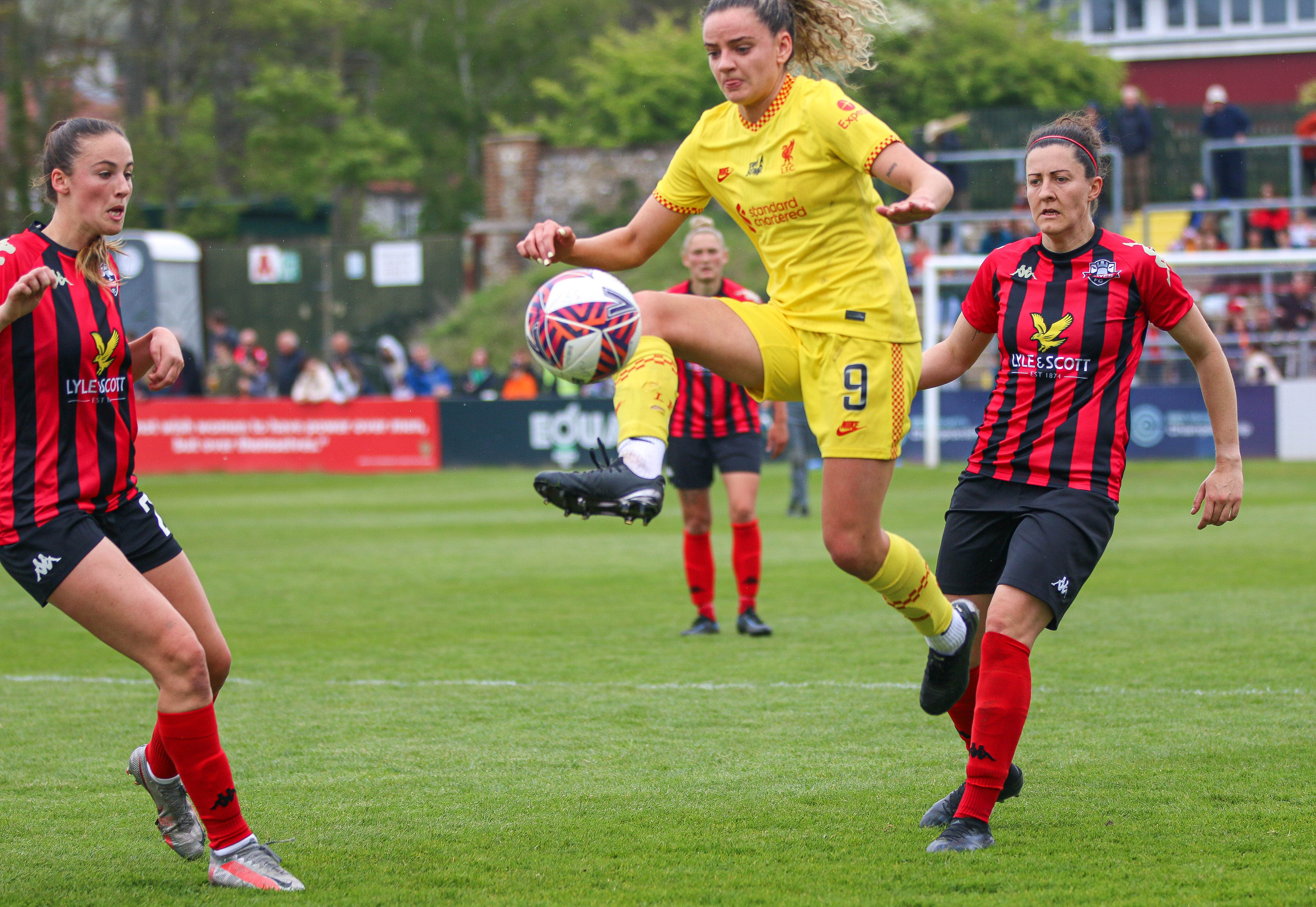
Kiernan (centre) playing for Liverpool against Lewes, May 2022

On 22 June 2021, Kiernan signed for Liverpool, where she was re-united with her former West Ham manager Matt Beard and was assigned the number 9 jersey. She recovered from shin splints which had disrupted her progress and recaptured her goal scoring form in the 2021–22 FA Women's Championship season. She scored 13 goals for the title-winning Liverpool team who won promotion back to the Women's Super League, and signed a new contract with Liverpool in September 2022. On the opening day of the 2022–23 Women's Super League season, Kiernan suffered an ankle injury in Liverpool's 2–1 win over Chelsea which required surgery and ruled her out for several months.

On 20 August 2025, Kiernan signed a new deal with the club.

On 30 January 2026, Kiernan signed on loan to Nottingham Forest for the remainder of the 2025/26 season.

On 28 July 2026, Kiernan was announced at Newcastle United.

== International career ==
Kiernan received a senior call-up in August 2016, first coming into the squad for two challenge matches against Wales in Newport. She scored the winner on her competitive debut, a 2–1 victory against the Basque Country at Tallaght Stadium on 26 November 2016. She was not named in Ireland's 2023 FIFA Women's World Cup squad. She received a red card late on in a World Cup Qualifier against The Netherlands after picking up two yellows after catching Marisa Olslagers high as she tried to volley clear a dropping ball the game finished in a 3–2 win for Ireland the referee gave the yellow card to Ireland's Marissa Sheva but Ireland players noted to the Hungarian referee to avoid a suspension for Sheva.

== Career statistics ==
=== Club ===
As of match played 2 May 2026'

Appearances and goals by club, season and competition
| Club | Season | League | | | National Cup (Note: Includes the Women's FA Cup) | | League Cup (Note: Includes the FA Women's League Cup) | | Europe (Note: Includes the UEFA Women's Champions League) | | Total | |
| Club | Season | Division | Apps | Goals | Apps | Goals | Apps | Goals | Apps | Goals | Apps | Goals |
|---|---|---|---|---|---|---|---|---|---|---|---|---|
| Shelbourne | 2016 | Women's National League | 12 | 11 | 3 | 5 | 0 | 0 | — | | 15 | 16 |
| Shelbourne | 2017 | Women's National League | 12 | 12 | 0 | 0 | 2 | 1 | — | | 14 | 13 |
| Shelbourne | 2018 | Women's National League | 8 | 11 | 0 | 0 | 1 | 0 | 1 | 0 | 10 | 11 |
| Shelbourne | Total | | 32 | 34 | 3 | 5 | 3 | 1 | 1 | 0 | 39 | 40 |
| West Ham | 2018–19 | Women's Super League | 15 | 2 | 0 | 0 | 2 | 1 | — | | 17 | 3 |
| West Ham | 2019–20 | Women's Super League | 9 | 1 | 0 | 0 | 4 | 2 | — | | 13 | 3 |
| West Ham | 2020–21 | Women's Super League | 7 | 0 | 0 | 0 | 3 | 2 | — | | 10 | 2 |
| West Ham | Total | | 31 | 3 | 0 | 0 | 9 | 5 | — | | 40 | 8 |
| Liverpool | 2021–22 | Women's Championship | 22 | 13 | 2 | 0 | 2 | 1 | — | | 26 | 14 |
| Liverpool | 2022–23 | Women's Super League | 2 | 0 | 0 | 0 | 0 | 0 | — | | 2 | 0 |
| Liverpool | 2023–24 | Women's Super League | 14 | 5 | 2 | 0 | 3 | 0 | — | | 19 | 5 |
| Liverpool | 2024–25 | Women's Super League | 16 | 2 | 3 | 1 | 3 | 1 | — | | 22 | 4 |
| Liverpool | 2025–26 | Women's Super League | 5 | 0 | 0 | 0 | 2 | 0 | — | | 7 | 0 |
| Liverpool | Total | | 59 | 20 | 7 | 1 | 10 | 2 | — | | 76 | 23 |
| Nottingham Forest (Loan) | 2025–26 | WSL 2 | 9 | 0 | 0 | 0 | 0 | 0 | — | | 9 | 0 |
| Career total | | | 131 | 57 | 10 | 6 | 22 | 8 | 1 | 0 | 165 | 71 |

=== International ===
As of match played 9 October 2026.

Appearances and goals by national team and year
| National team | Year | Apps | Goals |
|---|---|---|---|
| Republic of Ireland | 2016 | 1 | 0 |
| Republic of Ireland | 2017 | 7 | 0 |
| Republic of Ireland | 2018 | 7 | 4 |
| Republic of Ireland | 2019 | 5 | 0 |
| Republic of Ireland | 2020 | 1 | 0 |
| Republic of Ireland | 2021 | 2 | 0 |
| Republic of Ireland | 2022 | 4 | 0 |
| Republic of Ireland | 2023 | 1 | 0 |
| Republic of Ireland | 2024 | 12 | 0 |
| Republic of Ireland | 2025 | 3 | 0 |
| Republic of Ireland | 2026 | 2 | 0 |
| Total | | 45 | 4 |

Scores and results list Republic of Ireland's goals first, score column indicates score after each Kiernan goal.

International goals scored by Leanne Kiernan
| No. | Date | Venue | Opponent | Score | Result | Competition | Ref. |
|---|---|---|---|---|---|---|---|
| 1 | 21 January 2018 | Estádio de São Miguel, The Azores, Portugal | Portugal | 2–0 | 3–1 | Friendly | |
| 2 | 6 April 2018 | Tallaght Stadium, Tallaght, Republic of Ireland | Slovakia | 1–0 | 2–1 | 2019 FIFA Women's World Cup Qualification | |
| 3 | 31 August 2018 | Tallaght Stadium, Tallaght, Republic of Ireland | Northern Ireland | 1–0 | 4–0 | 2019 FIFA Women's World Cup Qualification | |
| 4 | 31 August 2018 | Tallaght Stadium, Tallaght, Republic of Ireland | Northern Ireland | 3–0 | 4–0 | 2019 FIFA Women's World Cup Qualification | |

== Honours ==
=== Club ===
Shelbourne

- WNL: 2016
- WNL Cup: 2015–16
- FAI Women's Cup: 2016

Liverpool FC

- FA Women's Championship: 2021-22

=== Individual ===
- WNL Young Player of the Year: 2016
- WNL Team of the Year: 2016
- The Irish Times Sportswoman of the Month: December 2016
