= Lucienne Reichardt =

Dutch association football player

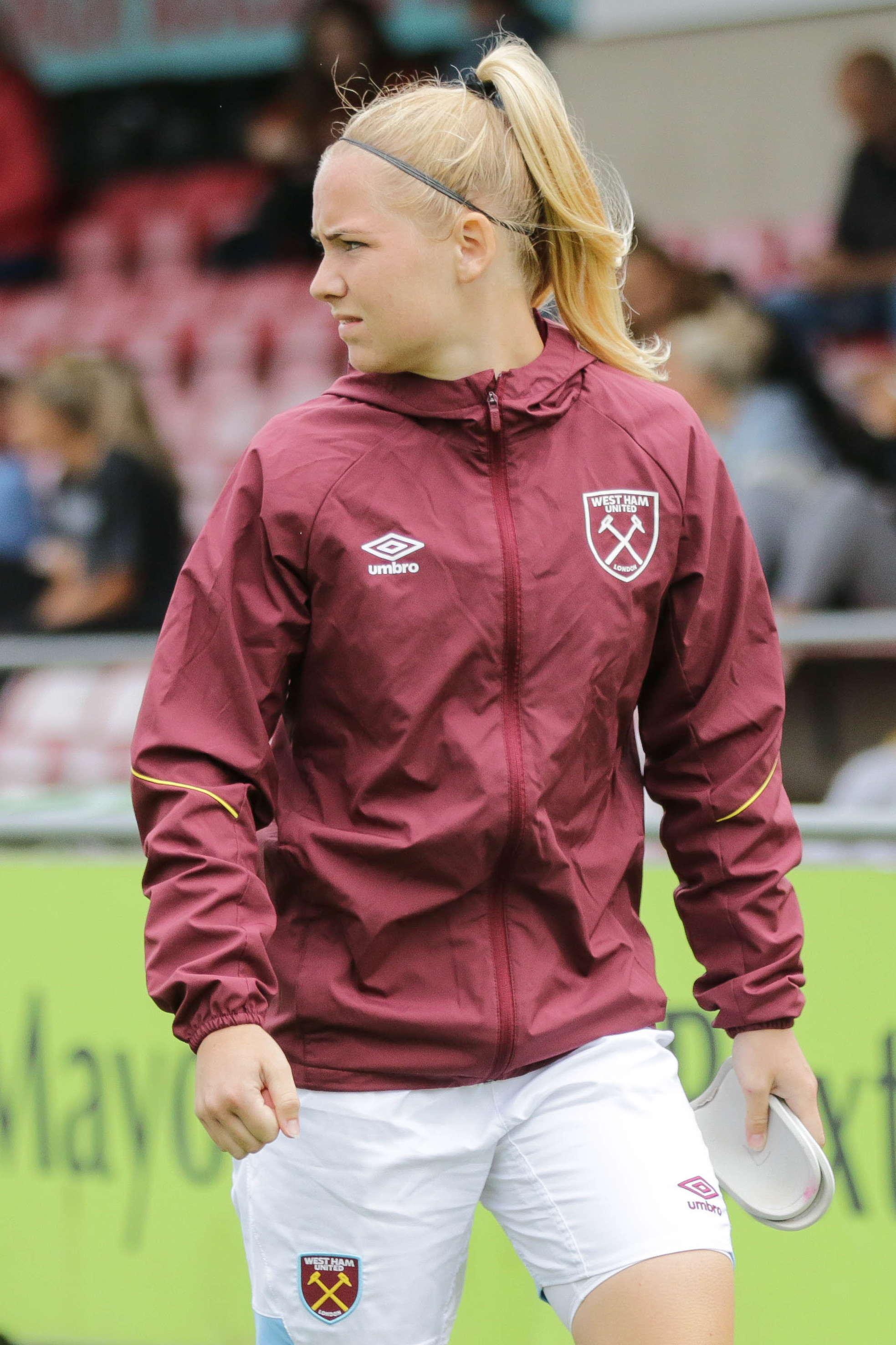
- Reichardt with West Ham United in 2018

Personal information
- Full name: Lucienne Anna Reichardt
- Date of birth: 1 May 1991 (age 35)
- Place of birth: Hoogkarspel, Netherlands
- Position: Midfielder

Youth career
- VV ESTO
- CVC Reeuwijk

Senior career*
Years	Team	Apps	(Gls)
2008–2009	Ter Leede		(2+)
2008–2014	ADO Den Haag	105	(5)
2016–2018	Ajax	30	(1)
2018–2019	West Ham United	12	(0)

International career
2006	Netherlands U15	1	(0)
2007	Netherlands U17	1	(0)
2010	Netherlands U19	5	(0)
- * Club domestic league appearances and goals

Lucienne Anna Reichardt (born 1 May 1991) is a Dutch former footballer who played as a midfielder.

== Club career ==
=== Ter Leede ===
Reichardt played for Ter Leede at the same time she played for ADO Den Haag, winning the championship with the club.

=== ADO Den Haag ===
Reichardt made her league debut against Twente on 1 October 2009. She scored her first league goal against Willem II on 5 May 2011, scoring in the 90th+2nd minute. Reichardt brought a successful six-year spell with ADO Den Haag to an end in summer 2014, because she wanted to complete her psychology studies and she had a persistent Achilles tendon injury. Two years later she found a doctor who performed surgery allowing her to return to top-level football. Instead of rejoining ADO Den Haag, she signed for her girlhood club AFC Ajax.

=== Ajax ===
Reichardt made her league debut against Achilles '29 on 18 November 2016. She scored her first league goal against VV Alkmaar on 23 December 2016, scoring in the 79th minute.

=== West Ham ===
In July 2018, Reichardt transferred to West Ham United from Ajax. She made her league debut against Reading on 19 September 2018. Reichardt was part of the squad that reached the final of the 2018–19 FA Women's Cup, where she was an unused substitute. On 7 May 2019, she announced her decision to retire from football at the end of the FA WSL season, aged 28, in order to pursue a career as a psychologist. In her final professional match Reichardt stood in as West Ham's captain, but the team were beaten 4–0 by Brighton.

== Post-playing career ==
Reichardt succeeded Kirsten van de Ven as manager of women's football at the KNVB. She is also studying a master's degree in sports management.

== Honours ==
=== Club ===
ADO Den Haag

- Eredivisie winner: 2011–12
- KNVB Women's Cup winner: 2011–12, 2012–13

AFC Ajax

- Eredivisie winner: 2016–17, 2017–18
- KNVB Women's Cup winner: 2016–17, 2017–18

West Ham United

- Women's FA Cup runner-up: 2018–19
