= Vyan Sampson =

Jamaican footballer (born 1996)

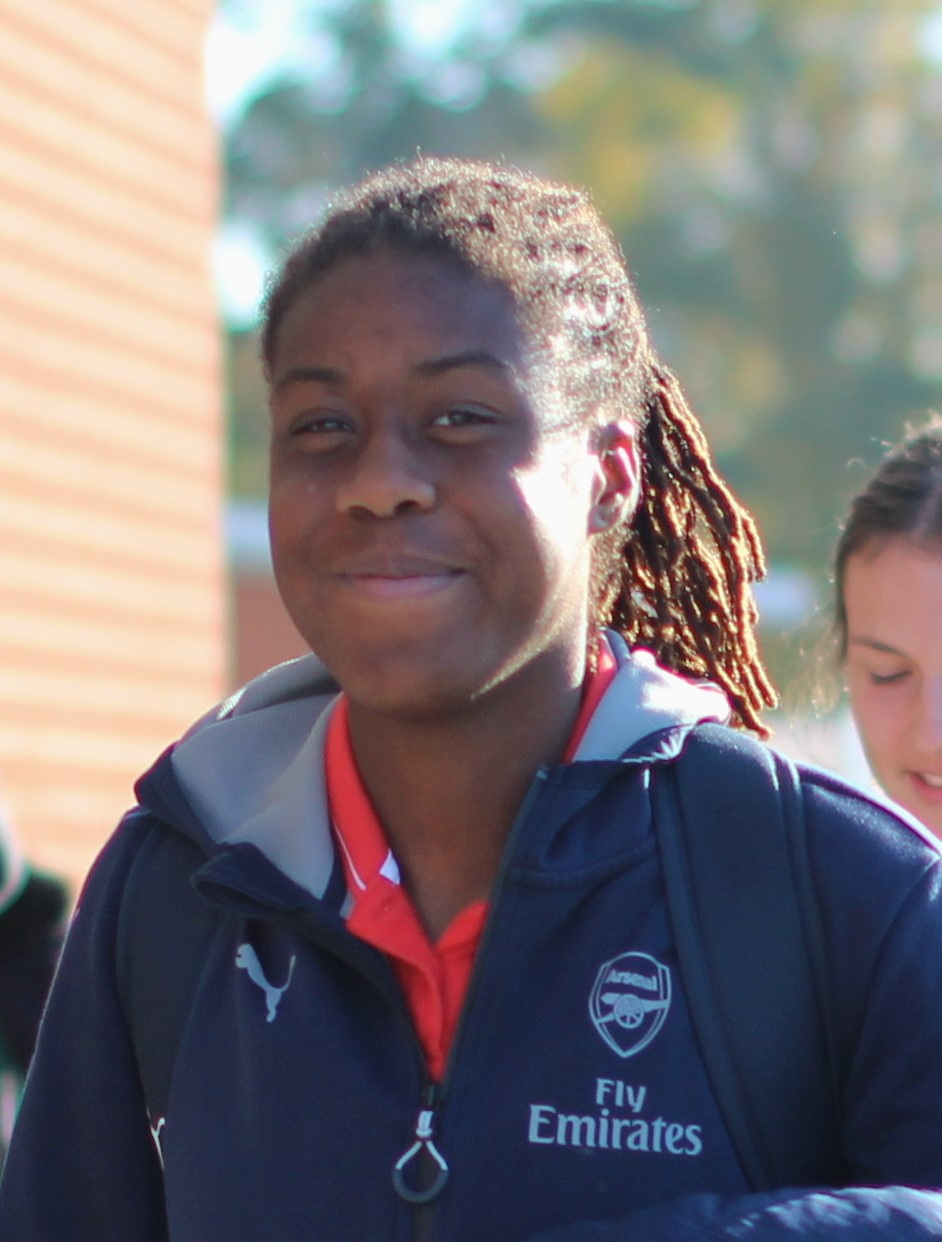
- Vyan Sampson with Arsenal in 2015

Personal information
- Date of birth: 2 July 1996 (age 30)
- Place of birth: London, England
- Position: Defender

Team information
- Current team: INAC Kobe Leonessa
- Number: 55

Youth career
- –2011: Charlton Athletic
- 2011–2014: Arsenal

Senior career*
Years	Team	Apps	(Gls)
2014–2018	Arsenal	2	(0)
2018–2020	West Ham United	15	(0)
2019–2020	→ London City Lionesses (loan)	10	(1)
2020	San Marino Academy	0	(0)
2021–2022	Charlton Athletic	15	(0)
2022–2023	Heart of Midlothian	23	(1)
2023–2024	JEF United Chiba	6	(0)
2024–	INAC Kobe	12	(0)

International career^{‡}
2012	England U17	5	(1)
2013–2014	England U19	4	(0)
2021–	Jamaica	26	(1)
Medal record
Representing Jamaica
CONCACAF W Championship
Third place	2022 Mexico
- * Club domestic league appearances and goals as of 23 March 2025 ‡ National team caps and goals as of 1 April 2026

Vyan Sampson (born 2 July 1996) is a professional footballer who plays as a defender for WE League club INAC Kobe Leonessa. Born in England, she represents Jamaica internationally.

== Club career ==
Sampson began her career in the youth ranks at Charlton Athletic before joining FA WSL 1 club Arsenal in 2011. Originally she played with the youth and reserve teams, where she won both domestic cups at reserve level and the League Cup with the Under-17s. She remained in the lower levels of Arsenal for three years between 2011 and 2014 before being promoted into the first-team squad, her competitive debut came on 12 October 2014 in the club's final WSL match of the season; a 3–1 home win versus Everton.

In the following season, 2015, Sampson made just one league appearance for Arsenal but did play four times in the FA WSL Cup which Arsenal went on to win after a 3–0 final win against Notts County; Sampson was substituted on for the final few minutes. At the start of 2016, Sampson signed a new contract with Arsenal. However, three months later she suffered a knee injury which ruled her out for four months. In April 2018, Sampson began featuring for West Ham United of the FA Women's Premier League Southern Division. On 19 June, as West Ham moved into the WSL for 2018–19, Sampson signed a contract with the club.

In August 2019, Sampson joined newly formed Championship outfit London City Lionesses on loan.

In September 2020, Sampson joined San Marino Academy in Serie A. She was named to one matchday squad but did not make an appearance.

On 28 January 2021, Sampson joined Charlton Athletic on a permanent contract until the end of the 2020–21 season.

In 2022, Sampson joined Heart of Midlothian.

In October 2023, Sampson joined WE League side JEF United Chiba Ladies.

== International career ==
Sampson has represented England at Under-17 and Under-19 level. Her debut for England U17s came on 13 April 2012 in a home defeat to Iceland in a 2012 UEFA Women's Under-17 Championship qualifier. She made four further appearances throughout 2014 for England U17s and scored one goal; versus Israel in qualifying for the 2013 UEFA Women's Under-17 Championship. In 2013, Sampson made the move into the England U19s and made her debut on 4 April against Serbia. Another qualifying appearance came before she was selected by England for the 2014 UEFA Women's Under-19 Championship, she played the full minutes in her nation's opening two games before missing the third and final game as England were knocked out at the group stage.

Following the historic FIFA Women's World Cup qualification by the Jamaica national team, Sampson was invited to their training camp roster in January 2019.

== International goals ==
No.	Date	Venue	Opponent	Score	Result	Competition
1.	2 December 2024	Catherine Hall Sports Complex, Montego Bay, Jamaica	South Africa	1–1	3–2	Friendly

== Career statistics ==
As of 18 March 2021.

Club statistics
Club	Season	League			Cup		League Cup		Continental		Other		Total	
Club	Season	Division	Apps	Goals	Apps	Goals	Apps	Goals	Apps	Goals	Apps	Goals	Apps	Goals
Arsenal	2014	FA WSL 1	1	0	0	0	0	0	0	0	0	0	1	0
Arsenal	2015	FA WSL 1	1	0	0	0	4	0	—		0	0	5	0
Arsenal	2016	FA WSL 1	0	0	0	0	0	0	—		0	0	0	0
Arsenal	2017	FA WSL 1	0	0	0	0	0	0	—		0	0	0	0
Arsenal	2017–18	FA WSL 1	0	0	0	0	0	0	—		0	0	0	0
Arsenal	Total		2	0	0	0	4	0	0	0	0	0	6	0
West Ham United	2017–18	WPL South	3	0	0	0	0	0	—		0	0	3	0
West Ham United	2018–19	FA WSL	12	0	0	0	4	0	—		0	0	16	0
West Ham United	2019–20	FA WSL	0	0	0	0	0	0	—		0	0	0	0
West Ham United	Total		15	0	0	0	4	0	—		0	0	19	0
London City Lionesses (loan)	2019–20	Championship	10	1	0	0	0	0	—		0	0	0	0
Charlton Athletic	2020–21	Championship	6	0	0	0	0	0	—		0	0	6	0
Career total			17	0	0	0	4	0	0	0	0	0	21	0

== Honours ==
Arsenal

- FA WSL Cup: 2015
