= Rosie Kmita =

English association football player

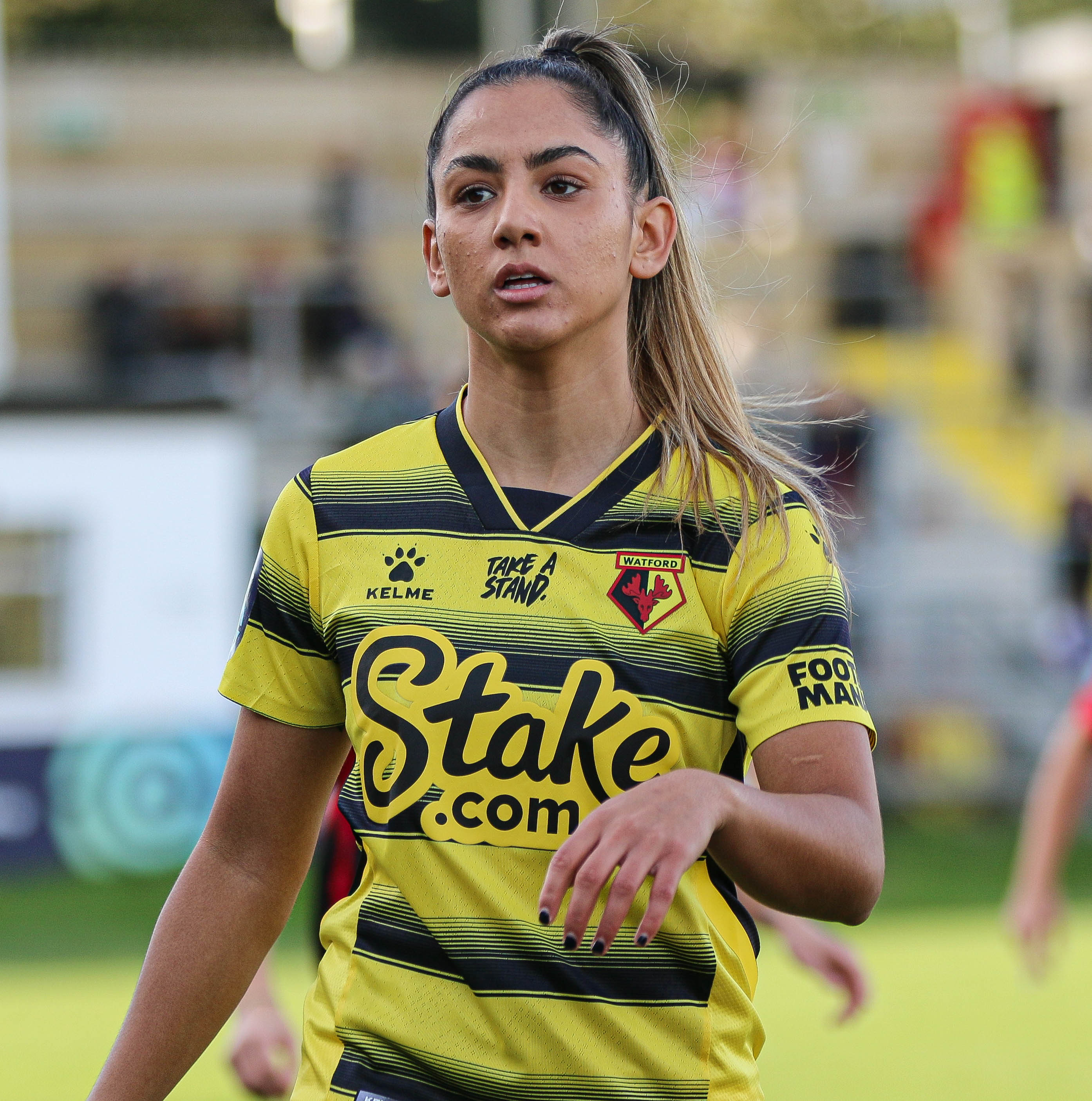
- Kmita with Watford in 2021

Personal information
- Date of birth: 27 July 1994 (age 32)
- Place of birth: Enfield, England
- Position: Winger

Youth career
- –2012: Tottenham Hotspur

College career
Years	Team	Apps	(Gls)
2012	Saint Leo Lions	16	(0)

Senior career*
Years	Team	Apps	(Gls)
2012–2013	Tottenham Hotspur	4	(0)
2013–2014	Brighton & Hove Albion		
2014–2016	Tottenham Hotspur	26	(0)
2016–2017	Cambridge United		
2017	Gillingham		
2017	London Bees	2	(0)
2018–2019	West Ham United	14	(1)
2019–2020	London Bees	1	(0)
2021–2022	Watford	8	(0)
Total		55+	(1+)
- * Club domestic league appearances and goals as of 7 November 2021

Rosie Kmita (born 27 July 1994) is an English former women's footballer who last played for Watford.

== Early life ==
Kmita, who is of Indian descent, was born in London as one of four children. Her twin sister Mollie was also a footballer. When Kmita was 16, her father, a football fan who had encouraged the girls to play, died of pneumonia.

== Club career ==
Kmita joined Tottenham Hotspur at the age of 10. She played college soccer with Saint Leo Lions and joined Brighton in December 2013. In 2016, having returned to Tottenham, she decided to leave for a second time to focus on her education. After spending 2016–17 in the lower divisions with Cambridge and Gillingham, she signed for FA WSL 2 club London Bees in August 2017.

In October 2017 Kmita joined West Ham United, linking up again with her twin sister Mollie who had played alongside Rosie at most of her previous clubs. When West Ham were awarded an FA Women's Super League franchise in summer 2018, Kmita was one of only two existing players to be retained and offered a professional contract. On 29 May 2019 West Ham announced that Kmita had departed the club.

In August 2019, Kmita rejoined London Bees in the FA Women's Championship.

In October 2020, Kmita signed for Watford in the FA Women's National League South. She received the club's Player of the Year award in the 2020-2021 season.

At the end of the 2021–2022 season, following Watford's relegation, Kmita retired from football to pursue other opportunities.

== After football ==
Kmita has worked in broadcasting, appearing as a presenter on coverage of the women’s game, and has spoken about being a role model for British Asian footballers. Alongside her twin sister, Kmita hosted Soccer AM in 2023.

In April 2021, Rosie and Mollie Kmita founded the Powerhouse Project, an initiative to support women in the UK training to become football coaches. The sisters have also partnered with Nike to support women and girls in football internationally.

== See also ==
- British Asians in association football
