= Claire Rafferty (footballer) =

English footballer and pundit

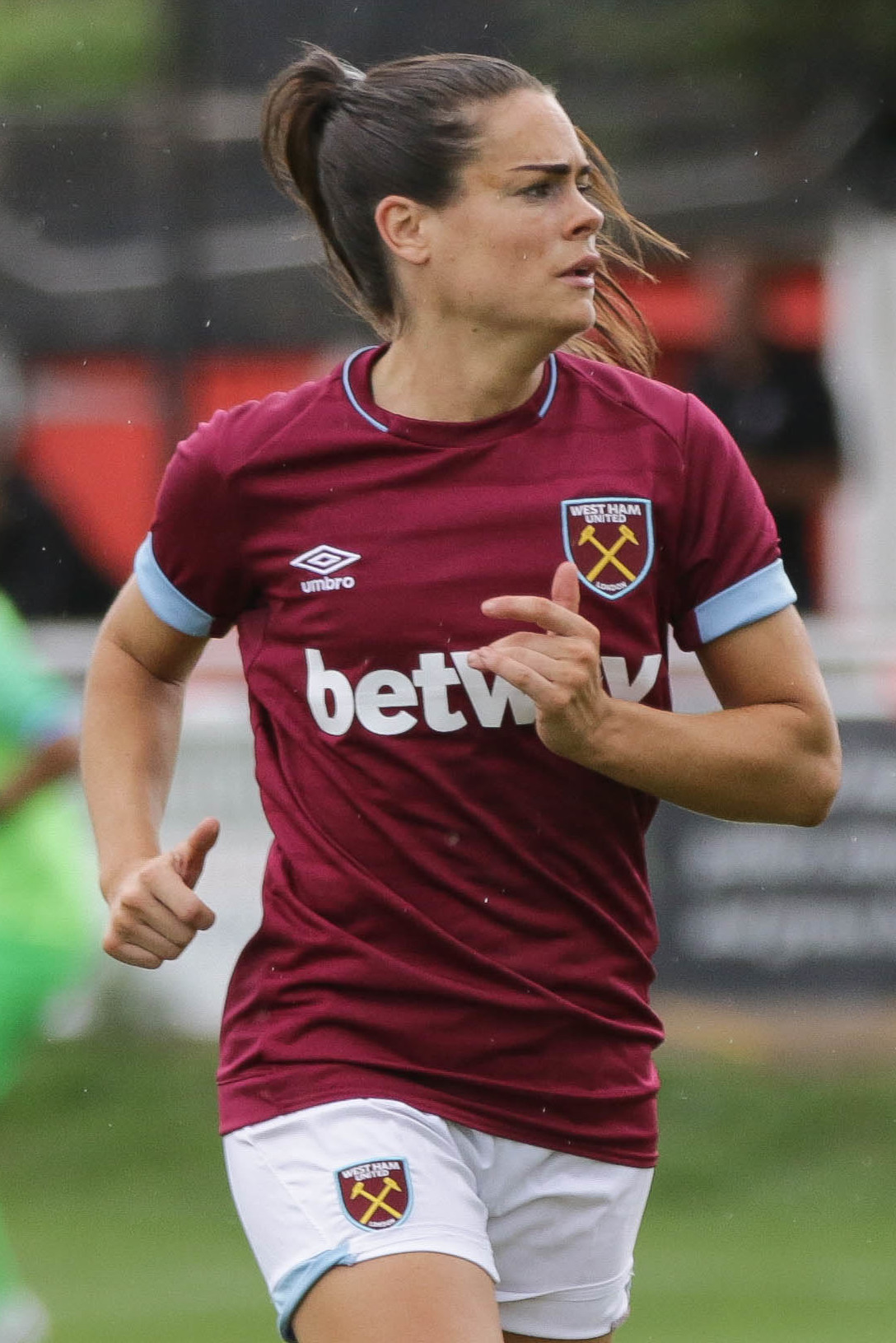
- Rafferty with West Ham United in 2018

Personal information
- Full name: Claire Lauren Rafferty
- Date of birth: 11 January 1989 (age 37)
- Place of birth: Orpington, London, England
- Height: 5 ft 5 in (1.64 m)
- Positions: Left back; left winger

Youth career
- Kent Magpies

Senior career*
Years	Team	Apps	(Gls)
2003–2007	Millwall Lionesses		
2007–2018	Chelsea	101	(12)
2018–2019	West Ham United	13	(1)

International career^{‡}
2008	England U19	7	(0)
2010	England U23	3	(1)
2010–2017	England	18	(0)
2012	Great Britain	1	(0)
Medal record
Women's football
Representing England
FIFA Women's World Cup
Bronze medal – third place	2015 Canada
- * Club domestic league appearances and goals as of 28 May 2019 ‡ National team caps and goals as of 14 June 2017

Claire Lauren Rafferty (born 11 January 1989) is an English pundit and retired professional footballer. She made over 100 appearances as a left back or left winger for Chelsea in the FA WSL and also spent time at Millwall Lionesses and West Ham United. Rafferty also represented England internationally and played at the 2012 Olympics for Great Britain.

== Club career ==
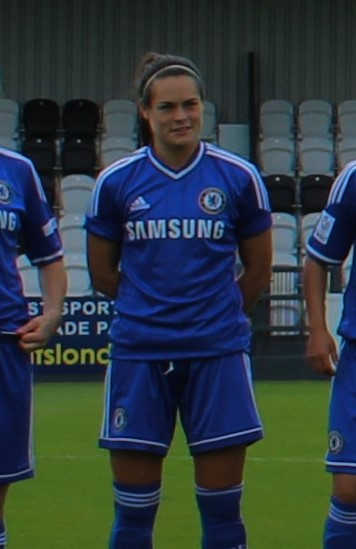
Rafferty with Chelsea in 2014

Rafferty became a first team regular with Millwall Lionesses as a 14-year-old. After recovering from an anterior cruciate ligament (ACL) injury, she signed for Chelsea Ladies in 2007 and became a regular on the left of midfield.

In August 2011 Rafferty suffered another ACL injury. She returned to the Chelsea team as a substitute in their televised 2012 FA WSL opening game against Doncaster Rovers Belles. Earlier in April 2012 Rafferty had been appointed as one of eight digital media ambassadors, one from each team, who wear their Twitter account name on their sleeves to raise the profile of the WSL.

In 2014 Rafferty helped Chelsea to second place in the FAWSL. There was a dramatic final day of the season which saw Chelsea narrowly missing out on the title by one goal difference.

Rafferty left Chelsea Ladies at the end of the 2017–18 season. In June 2018, she joined West Ham United Ladies. She retired at the end of the 2018–19 season.

== International career ==
=== England ===
Rafferty was involved with England at U15 development, U17, U19, U20 and U23 level. She had been called into the U19 squad at the age of 15. Her full debut came on 25 March 2010 against Austria.

In June 2011 Rafferty was named in the 21–player squad for the 2011 FIFA Women's World Cup. At the quarter-final stage of the competition against France, she was substituted on for regular left back Rachel Unitt in the 81st minute, to make her World Cup debut. England coach Hope Powell considered Rafferty better equipped to cope with the pace of Élodie Thomis.

When the match finished 1–1 after extra-time, Rafferty missed England's fourth penalty in the shootout, sending her spot kick wide of the post. Although England were knocked out when Faye White also missed, Hope Powell praised Rafferty for stepping forward when other, more experienced team mates were exhibiting "cowardice."

Rafferty's international career has been plagued with injury having ruptured her ACL three times, most recently in 2013. After overcoming this for the third time Rafferty was recalled to the England squad in late 2014 for the friendly against Germany at Wembley Stadium. Rafferty made her first England appearance in two and a half years in March 2015 as England won the Cyprus Cup. Rafferty was selected for the 2015 World Cup and was first choice left-back as England reached the semi-finals and achieved third-place. Rafferty was unfortunate to concede a penalty in the semi-final against Japan for a push which was outside the box.

Rafferty was allotted 175 when the FA announced their legacy numbers scheme to honour the 50th anniversary of England’s inaugural international.

=== Great Britain Olympic ===
In June 2012 Rafferty was named in the 18–player Great Britain squad for the 2012 London Olympics.

== Retirement ==
Rafferty now makes regular media appearances. In the summer immediately following her retirement, Rafferty made numerous television and radio appearances as a pundit during the 2019 FIFA Women's World Cup.

In July 2019, Rafferty returned to Chelsea in a commercial role. Chelsea Commercial Director, Chris Townsend OBE commented on Rafferty's "extensive experience in elite-level sport combined with her business and analytical skills accumulated working at an investment bank" which made her an important asset to the club.

== Personal life ==
Rafferty attended Colfe's School until 2008. She studied economics at Loughborough University, and graduated in 2011. As well as her football commitments she is a part-time Analyst at Deutsche Bank. During the 2015 FIFA Women's World Cup, Rafferty was named 43rd in the ZOO Magazine "Hot 101" issue.

Rafferty married her partner Erica Cleary on 13 September 2025 after getting engaged in May 2023.

== Honours ==
=== Club ===
Chelsea

- FA WSL: 2015, 2017–18
- FA Women's Cup: 2014–15, 2017–18

=== International ===
- Cyprus Cup: 2015
- FIFA Women's World Cup third place: 2015
