= Rebecca Spencer =

American singer and actress (born 1960)

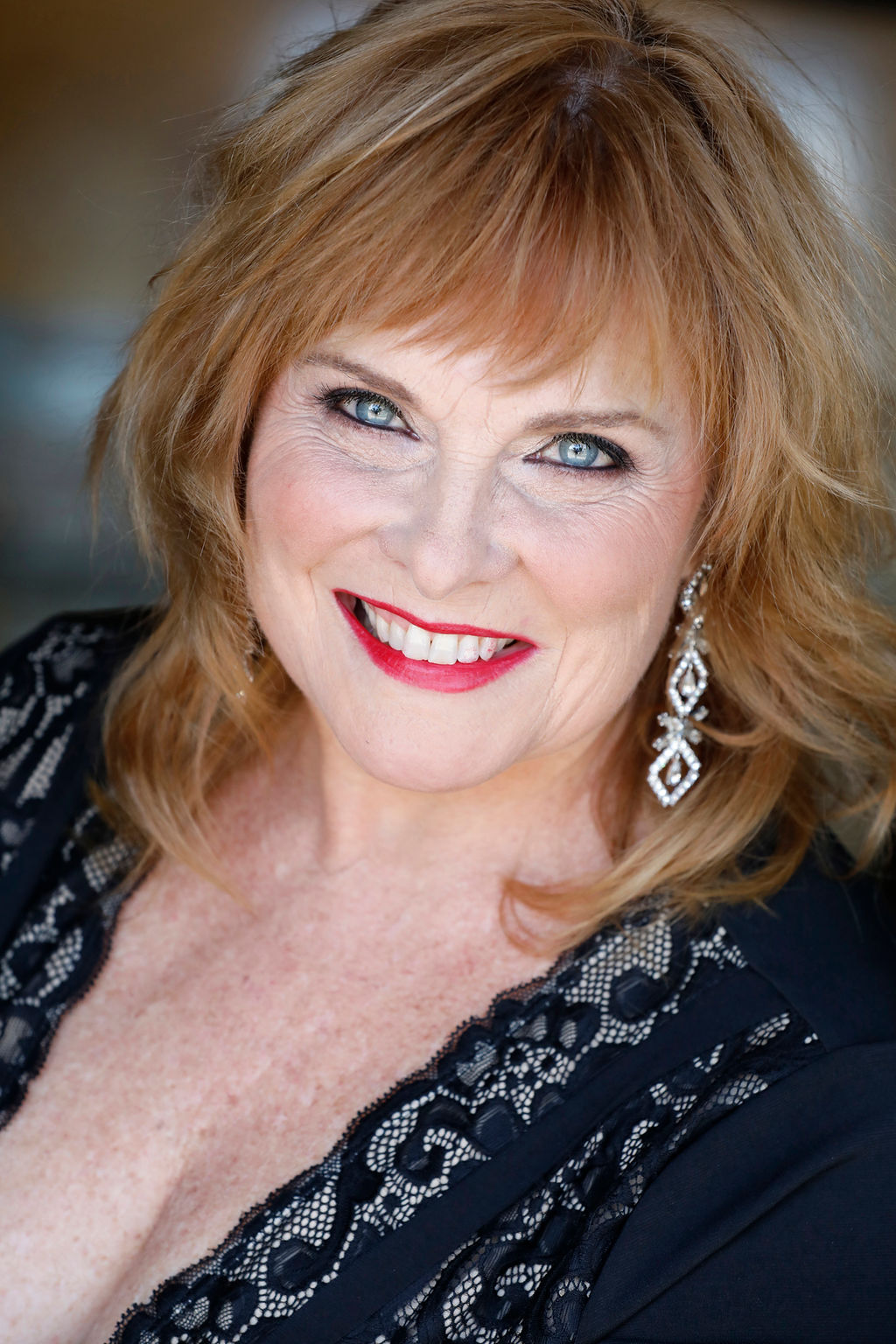

Background information
- Born: 29 April 1960 (age 66); Bristol, Pennsylvania, U.S.
- Origin: Levittown, U.S.
- Genre: Pop
- Occupations: Actress; singer
- Instrument: vocals
- Years active: 1983–present

Rebecca Spencer (born April 29, 1960) is an American singer and actress, known for her roles in musicals and cabaret productions. Over the course of her career, Spencer has performed principal roles in over 50 opera, national tour, regional and Off-Broadway productions, including co-starring in Hollywood Bowl's 2019 production of Into the Woods (in the role of Jack's Mother). She created the role of Lisa Carew in the world premiere of Frank Wildhorn's Jekyll and Hyde at the Alley Theatre, opposite Linda Eder and Chuck Wagner, and premiered the role of Madame Giry in the $35 million production of Phantom - The Las Vegas Spectacular, under the direction of Harold Prince.

== Early life and education ==
Spencer was born the youngest of three children in Bristol, Pennsylvania, and raised in nearby Levittown. She graduated from Ithaca College in 1982 with a Bachelor of Music. While in college, Spencer began her professional theatre career, appearing in productions at Theatre By The Sea in Matunuck, Rhode Island, including West Side Story, Brigadoon, and Sweeney Todd.

== Career ==
Following college, Spencer's early career included roles in productions at the Candlewood Playhouse in Connecticut, as Philia in A Funny Thing Happened on the Way to the Forum, Johanna in Sweeney Todd: The Demon Barber of Fleet Street, and as Anna Held in Tintypes (at the Shawnee Playhouse in Pennsylvania).

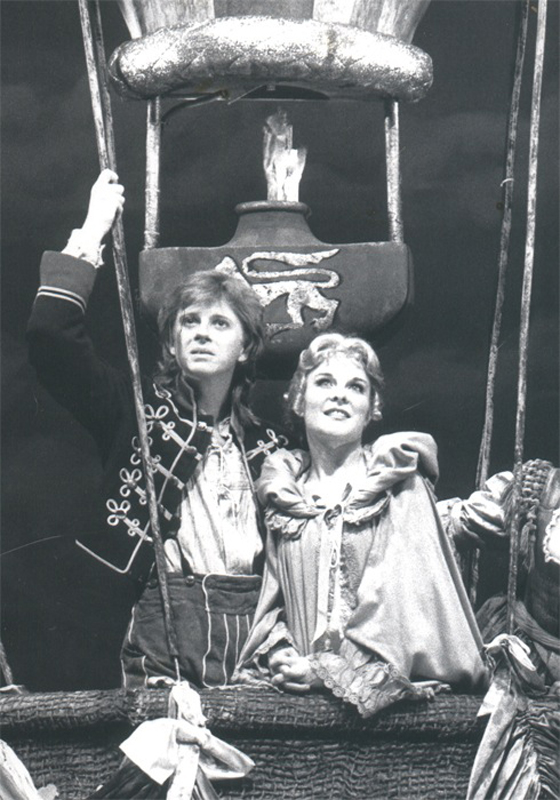
Rebecca Spencer as Cunegonde in CANDIDE at the Paper Mill Playhouse

In 1985, Spencer played the role of Scrooge's fiancé, Belle, in A Christmas Carol at the Missouri Repertory Theatre, as well as Johanna in Sweeney Todd at the Lyric Opera of Kansas City. In 1986 Spencer performed as the Matinee Cunegonde in Candide at the Paper Mill Playhouse in New Jersey. and returned a year later to play the Matinee title role in Naughty Marietta.

In the late 1980s Spencer appeared as Marsinah in Kismet at the Equity Library Theatre and in the Goodspeed Opera's national tour of Lady, Be Good! as Shirley. She embarked on her first national tour as Antonia in Man of La Mancha, starring Hal Linden, and appeared as Magnolia in Show Boat, opposite Davis Gaines, at both the Minnesota Opera and Opera Omaha.

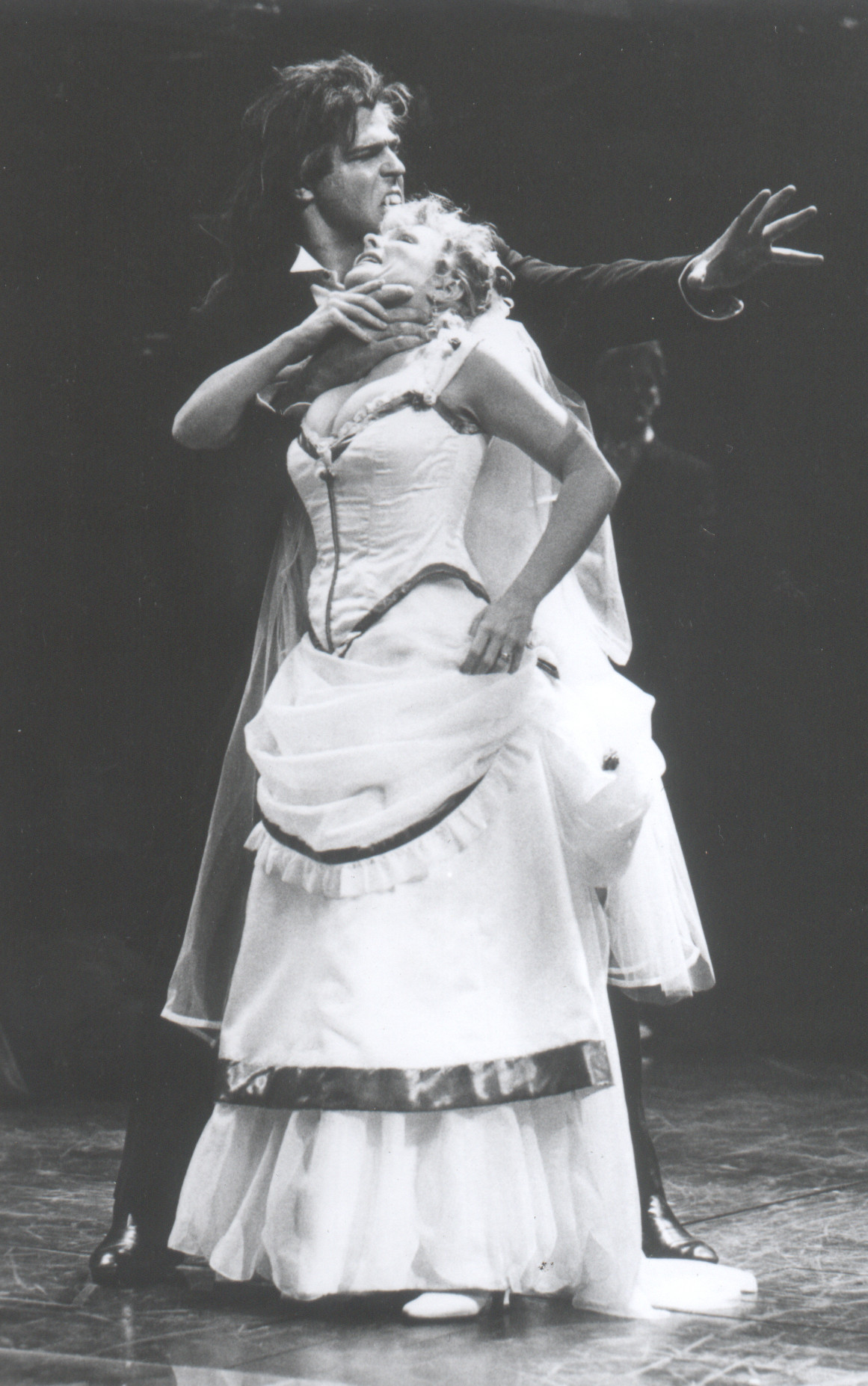
Rebecca Spencer as Lisa Carew in Jekyll and Hyde

In 1990, Spencer created the role of Lisa (Emma) Carew in the Alley Theatre world premiere of Frank Wildhorn's Jekyll and Hyde, opposite Chuck Wagner and Linda Eder, and appeared as Dorothy in The Wizard of Oz at Theatre Under the Stars in Houston, Texas, under the direction of Philip William McKinley. The early 1990s included roles as Marian Paroo in The Music Man at Theatre By The Sea in Matunuck, RI, opposite recent Tony Award winner Michael McGrath as Harold Hill, six months with the Hamburg, Germany company of Das Phantom der Oper as Carlotta (Harold Prince's company, performed in German), Christine in the Yeston Phantom at the TriArts in Pine Plains, New York and Theatre By The Sea in Matunuck, RI, Belle in A Christmas Carol at the Trinity Repertory Company in Providence, directed by Richard Jenkins, and Rosabella in the Jupiter Theatre's production of The Most Happy Fella.

In the mid and late 1990s, she returned to the Jupiter Theatre in Seven Brides for Seven Brothers and toured nationally as Antonia in Man of La Mancha (with John Cullum). In addition, she played Babe in the Virginia Musical Theatre's production of The Pajama Game, and was a member of the Toronto workshop of Ragtime, directed by Frank Galati.

On April 27, 1997, Spencer made her Broadway debut in Jekyll and Hyde, as the female swing. She performed numerous roles in the production, including as a replacement for Emma Carew, and eventually took over the principal role of Lady Beaconsfield.

In the early 200s, her roles included Buttercup in HMS Pinafore at the Arizona Theatre Company, Tessie Tura in Gypsy, at both the Cincinnati Playhouse and the Repertory Theatre of St. Louis, the Musicals Tonight! production of Irving Berlin's Watch Your Step, Mother Abbess in The Sound of Music at the Helen Hayes Theatre in Nyack, NY, Lady Beaconsfield in Jekyll and Hyde at the Pittsburgh Civic Light Opera, and Dolly Levi in Hello, Dolly! at the Weston Playhouse in Vermont.

In 2006 Spencer debuted Madame Giry in the premiere of Phantom-The Las Vegas Spectacular, under the direction of Harold Prince. While in Las Vegas, she appeared in a number of benefit concerts for various community groups, including the American premiere of Jerry Springer: The Opera performed at the MGM Grand in Las Vegas. and God Lives in Glass, by composer Keith Thompson. In 2009, Spencer returned to New York City in Heaven in Your Pocket at the New York Musical Theatre Festival.

In 2010 she relocated to Seattle, and subsequently appeared as Vicki in The Full Monty at the Village Theatre in Issaquah, WA, directed by Jerry Dixon, Solange La Fitte in the Showtunes presentation of Follies, at the Moore Theatre in Seattle, and Dorothy Brock in 42nd Street at the Merry-Go-Round Playhouse in Auburn, NY.

In 2012, Spencer returned to her role as Madame Giry for the World Tour of Phantom of the Opera, produced by the Asia/Pacific arm of the Really Useful Company. After performing in Manila from August through October 2012, Spencer continued on to Seoul, South Korea through early 2013.

Rebecca relocated in 2013 to Los Angeles, where she starred in productions of The Music Man, S'Wonderful, Catch Me If You Can, and Mary Poppins at Musical Theatre West, and The Heir Apparent at International City Theatre in Long Beach. In 2016 she was the standby for Betty Buckley in Grey Gardens at the Ahmanson Theatre, directed by Michael Wilson. In 2019 she starred as Jack's Mother in Into the Woods at the Hollywood Bowl.

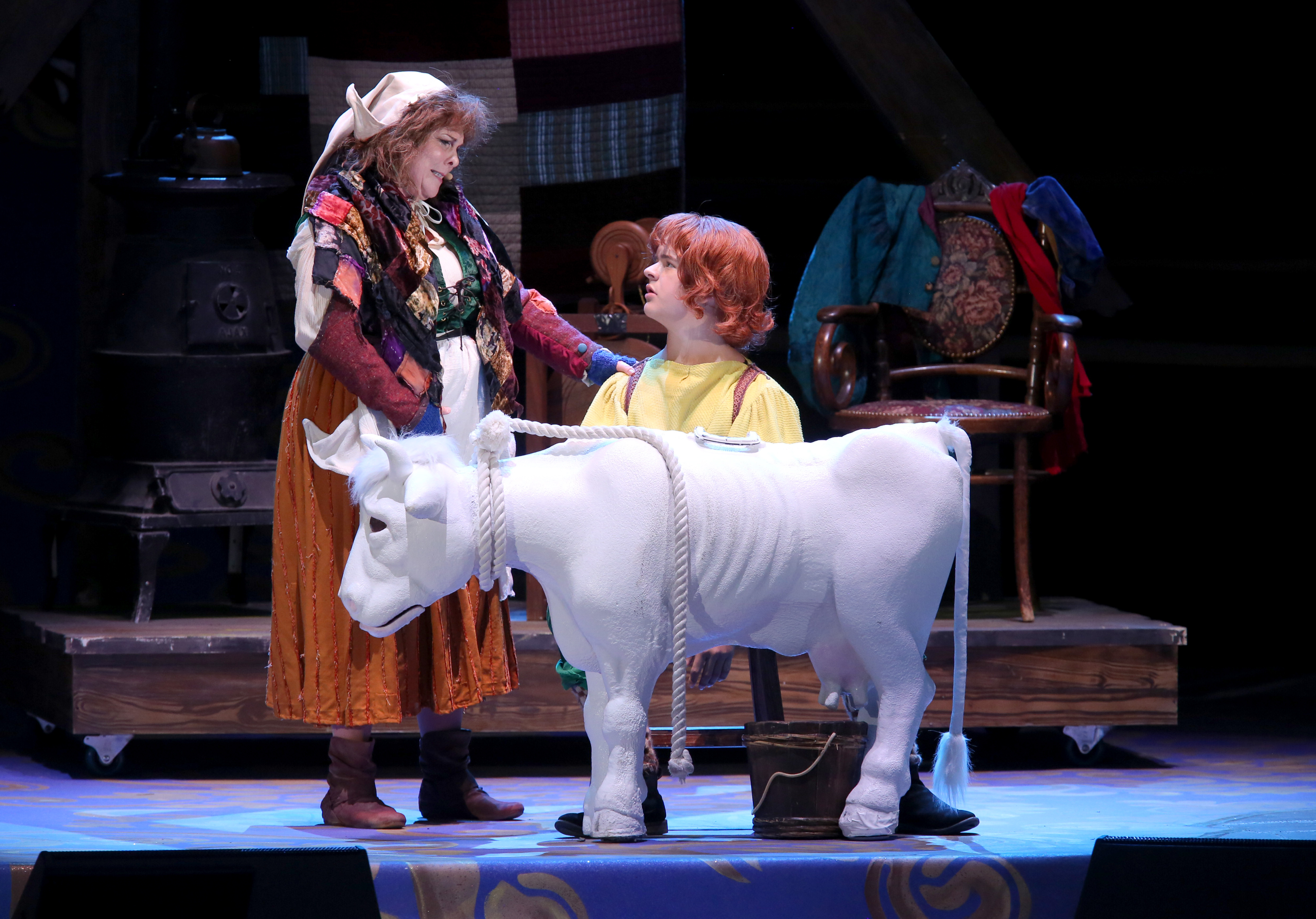
Rebecca Spencer as Jack's Mother in Into the Woods

Spencer's television credits include Third Watch and Law & Order: Special Victims Unit.

== Concerts and cabaret appearances ==
Spencer appeared in five ENCORES! Concerts at the City Center: Call Me Madame (1995), A Connecticut Yankee (2001), Carnival (2002), The New Moon (2003), and Pardon My English (2004). She was a guest soloist in The Songs of Jerry Herman as part of the 92nd Street Y's Lyrics and Lyricists program in New York City and in the ensemble for the Ira Gershwin Centennial at Carnegie Hall, recorded for PBS. She was also featured at the Mabel Mercer Foundation’s 2004 & 2005 NYC Cabaret Conventions and appeared in the VOX series at the New York City Opera in 2002 (Lovers and Friends) and 2003 (The Old Majestic).

Spencer has performed in concert as a guest soloist with the Syracuse, New Haven and Detroit Symphonies, and the Florida Orchestra, the Indianapolis and Naples Symphonies conducted by Keith Lockhart of the Boston Pops, and as the guest soloist for composer Marvin Hamlisch.

Her solo cabaret shows with her longtime musical director, Philip Fortenberry, have been performed in Las Vegas and around the country, including the Birdland Jazz Club in NYC, Castle on the Hudson in Tarrytown, NY, the Liberace Museum in Las Vegas, and the Blue Heron Arts Center on Vashon Island, WA. In Las Vegas, she conceived the script for the 2007 Liberace Piano Competitions and co-hosted the international competition. She was also a monthly performer in the Las Vegas Composer’s Showcase. In 2016 Rebecca headlined the inaugural season of The Sorting Room concert series at the Wallis Annenberg Center for the Performing Arts in Beverly Hills.

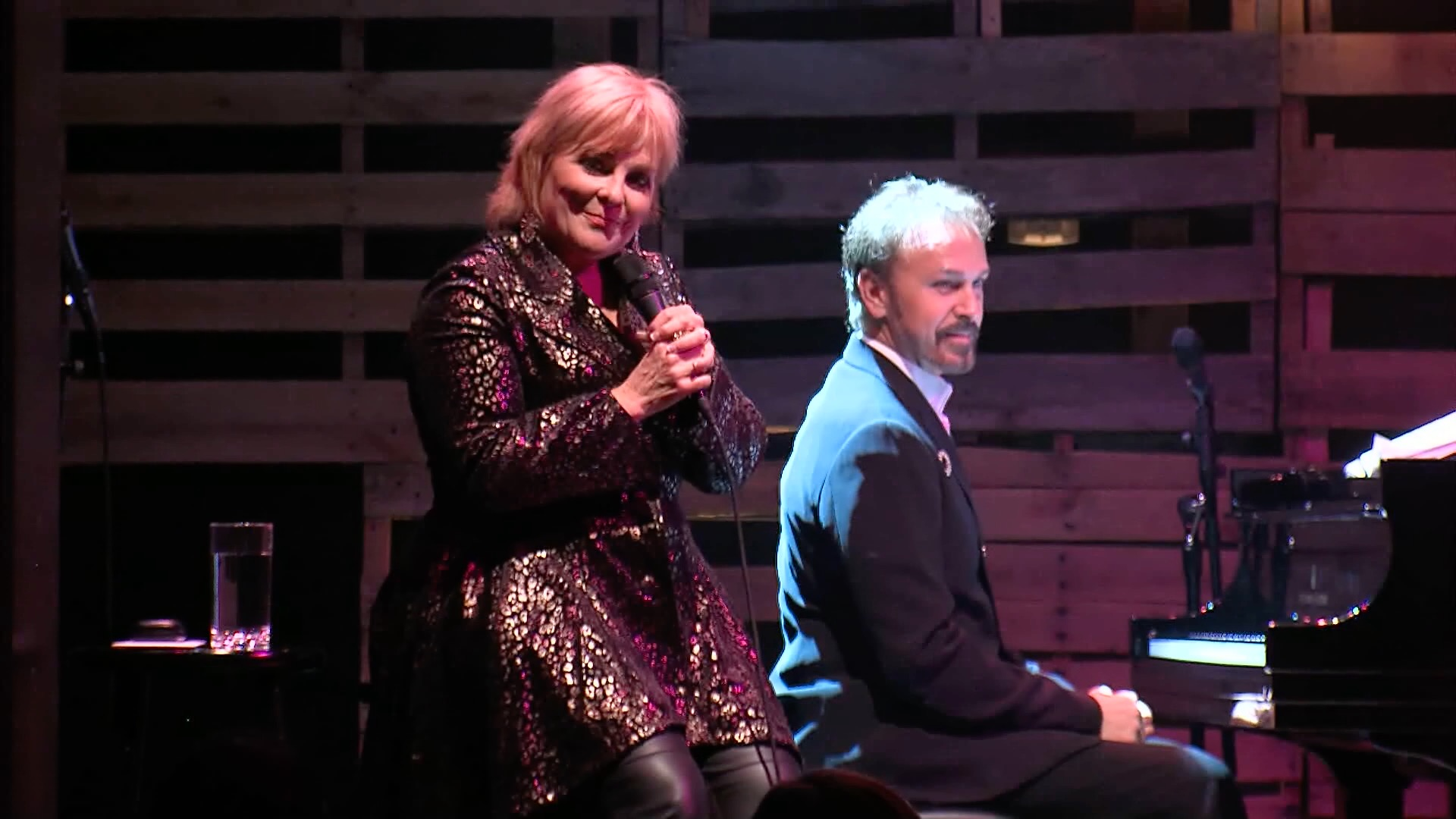
Rebecca Spencer with Philip Fortenberry at The Sorting Room at the Wallis Annenberg Center for the Performing Arts, Beverly Hills

== Discography ==
Spencer has appeared on several recordings, including theatrical cast recordings and compilations.

- Still Still Still (2018) LML Music - solo album
- Wide Awake and Dreaming (2004) LML Music - Awarded the 2004 Back Stage Bistro Award for Outstanding Achievement in a Recording - solo album
- Fair Warning (2006) LML Music - solo album
- Jekyll and Hyde, Original Broadway Cast Album, Atlantic
- Songs from Ragtime the Musical, BMG
- Watch Your Step, Off-Broadway Cast Recording
- Linda Eder: Christmas Stays the Same, Atlantic
- Rivertown Voices, Garagista Records
- Not Just Another Holiday CD, Garagista Records
- The New Moon, Encores! Cast Recording, Ghostlight Records
- Our Heart Sings, Jerome Records
- Drat! The Cat!, Varèse Sarabande

== Awards and nominations ==
Spencer was awarded the 2004 Backstage Bistro Award for her debut solo recording, Wide Awake and Dreaming. She was nominated for a Carbonell Award for her performance as Rosabella in The Most Happy Fella at the Jupiter Theatre in Florida.
