= Peggy Lee singles discography =

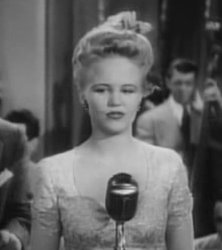
- Peggy Lee in the film Stage Door Canteen, 1943.
- Singles: 157
- Promotional singles: 18
- Other charted songs: 8

The singles discography of American singer-songwriter Peggy Lee contains 157 singles, 18 promotional singles and eight other charted songs. Lee's first singles were in collaboration with Benny Goodman and His Orchestra, beginning 1941's "Elmer's Tune". Its follow-up, "I Got It Bad (And That Ain't Good)", was Lee's first to make the US chart. She recorded 18 singles with Goodman between 1941 and 1944, including nine that made the US chart. Two of these releases made the top ten, including "Why Don't You Do Right?" (1942). Lee then embarked on a solo career in 1946 and reached the number four position with her debut release, "Waitin' for the Train to Come In". Twenty three of her singles made the US and Australian charts during the 1940s, including the top ten songs "I Don't Know Enough About You" (1946), "It's All Over Now" (1946), "Chi-Baba, Chi-Baba" (1947), "Golden Earrings" (1947), "Riders in the Sky (A Cowboy Legend)" (1949) and "The Old Master Painter" (1949). Additionally, "Mañana (Is Soon Enough for Me)" became Lee's first (and only) single to reach number one on the US chart.

The Capitol and Decca labels issued 19 singles between 1950 and 1951, but only two made the US and Australian charts. In collaboration with Gordon Jenkins's orchestra, Lee made the top five of the US chart with 1953's "Lover". Four more singles made the US chart through 1954. This included the US top 20 song, "Just One of Those Things" and a US top 30 collaboration with Bing Crosby called "Watermelon Weather". A majority of Lee's singles did not make any major chart positions until 1956's "Mr. Wonderful". It rose into the US top 20, the Australian top five and became her first single to chart in the UK, climbing to number five. Lee's 1958 single, "Fever", reached commercial success in several countries. It peaked at number eight in the US, number two in Australia, number 11 in Canada and number five in the UK.

Lee's singles continued making the music charts in multiple countries during the 1960s. This began with "Heart" (1960), which reached number 41 in Australia and "Till There Was You" (1961), which peaked at number 30 in the UK. The 1962 single, "I'm a Woman", rose to number 54 in the US and number 79 in Australia. Ten of her songs made the US Adult Contemporary chart during the decade, beginning with "Pass Me By" in 1964. Her 1965 single, "Big Spender", rose to number nine on the chart while 1967's "I Feel It" climbed to number eight. The 1969 release, "Is That All There Is?", became Lee's highest chart entry in more than ten years, peaking at number 11 in the US, number one on the US Adult Contemporary chart, number six in Canada and number one on Canada's Adult Contemporary chart. Singles by Lee continued being released through various labels into the 1970s. Her last to make the US charts was 1974's "Let's Love" and a re-release of "Fever" in 1992 was her last entry in the UK.

== Singles ==
=== 1940s ===
List of singles, with selected chart positions, showing other relevant details
Title	Year	Peak chart positions		Album
Title	Year	US	AUS	Album
"Elmer's Tune" (with Benny Goodman and His Orchestra)	1941	—	—	non-album singles
"I Got It Bad (and That Ain't Good)" (with Benny Goodman and His Orchestra)	1941	25	—	non-album singles
"Let's Do It (Let's Fall in Love)" (with Benny Goodman and His Orchestra)	1941	—	—	non-album singles
"Shady Lady Bird" (with Benny Goodman and His Orchestra)	1941	—	—	non-album singles
"Somebody Else Is Taking My Place" (with Benny Goodman and His Orchestra)	1941	5	—	non-album singles
"Winter Weather" (with Art Lund, Benny Goodman and His Orchestra)	1941	24	—	non-album singles
"How Long Has This Been Going On?" (with Benny Goodman and His Orchestra)	1942	—	—	non-album singles
"Blues in the Night" (with Lou McGarity, Benny Goodman and His Orchestra)	1942	20	—	non-album singles
"Somebody Nobody Loves" (with Benny Goodman and His Orchestra)	1942	—	—	non-album singles
"The Lamp of Memory" (with Benny Goodman and His Orchestra)	1942	—	—	non-album singles
"My Little Cousin" (with Benny Goodman and His Orchestra)	1942	14	—	non-album singles
"We'll Meet Again" (with Benny Goodman and His Orchestra)	1942	16	—	non-album singles
"Not Mine" (with Benny Goodman and His Orchestra)	1942	—	—	non-album singles
"Full Moon" (with Benny Goodman and His Orchestra)	1942	22	—	non-album singles
"The Way You Look Tonight" (with Benny Goodman and His Orchestra)	1942	21	—	non-album singles
"On the Sunny Side of the Street" (with the Benny Goodman Sextet)	1942	—	—	non-album singles
"Why Don't You Do Right" (with Benny Goodman and His Orchestra)	1942	4	12	non-album singles
"My Old Flame" (with Benny Goodman and His Orchestra)	1944	—	—	non-album singles
"Atchison, Topeka and the Santa Fe" (with Bob Crosby and His Orchestra)	1945	—	—	non-album singles
"What More Can a Woman Do?"	1945	—	—	non-album singles
"Waitin' for the Train to Come In"	1946	4	—	non-album singles
"I Don't Know Enough About You"	1946	7	—	non-album singles
"Linger in My Arms a Little Longer, Baby"	1946	16	—	non-album singles
"It's All Over Now"	1946	10	—	non-album singles
"It's a Good Day"	1946	16	—	non-album singles
"Everything's Movin' Too Fast"	1947	21	—	non-album singles
"Speaking of Angels"	1947	—	—	non-album singles
"Chi-Baba Chi-Baba (My Bambino Go to Sleep)"	1947	10	—	non-album singles
"It Takes a Long Long Train With a Red Caboose (To Carry My Blues Away)"	1947	—	—	non-album singles
"There'll Be Some Changes Made"	1947	—	—	non-album singles
"Golden Earrings"	1947	2	3	non-album singles
"Mañana (Is Soon Enough for Me)"	1947	1	2	non-album singles
"For Every Man There's a Woman" (with Benny Goodman and His Orchestra)	1948	25	—	non-album singles
"Laroo Laroo Lili Bolero"	1948	13	—	non-album singles
"Somebody Else Is Takin' My Place" (with Benny Goodman and His Orchestra)	1948	30 (Note: "Somebody Else Is Takin' My Place" was reissued as a single in April 1948. The reissue charted again in 1948, reaching a different peak position than in its first release in 1941.)	—	Benny Goodman Dance Parade
"Caramba! It's the Samba"	1948	13	—	non-album singles
"Bubble-Loo Bubble-Loo"	1948	23	—	non-album singles
"Don't Smoke in Bed"	1948	22	—	Rendezvous with Peggy Lee
"Don't Be So Mean to Baby"	1948	—	—	non-album singles
"So Dear to My Heart"	1948	—	—	non-album singles
"You Was Right, Baby"	1948	—	—	non-album singles
"Hold Me"	1948	—	—	non-album singles
"You Was" (with Dean Martin)	1949	—	—	non-album singles
"Blum Blum (I Wonder Who I Am)	1949	27	—	non-album singles
"Bali Ha'i"	1949	13	19	non-album singles
"Similau (See-Me-Lo)"	1949	17	—	non-album singles
"Riders in the Sky (A Cowboy Legend)"	1949	2	1	non-album singles
"You Can Have Him"	1949	—	—	non-album singles
"Neon Signs (I'm Gonna Shine Like Neon Too)"	1949	—	—	non-album singles
"A Man Wrote a Song"	1949	—	—	non-album singles
"The Christmas Spell"	1949	—	—	non-album singles
"The Old Master Painter" (with Mel Tormé and The Mellomen)	1949	9	9	non-album singles
"—" denotes a recording that did not chart or was not released in that territory.

=== 1950s ===
List of singles, with selected chart positions, showing other relevant details
Title	Year	Peak chart positions				Album
Title	Year	US	AUS	CAN	UK	Album
"She Didn't Say Yes"	1950	—	—	—	—	non-album singles
"My Small Senor"	1950	—	—	—	—	non-album singles
"Goodbye John"	1950	—	—	—	—	non-album singles
"Crazy He Calls Me"	1950	—	—	—	—	non-album singles
"Cry, Cry, Cry"	1950	—	—	—	—	non-album singles
"Show Me the Way to Get Out of This World"	1950	28	—	—	—	non-album singles
"Lover, Come Back to Me"	1950	—	—	—	—	non-album singles
"Once in a Lifetime"	1950	—	—	—	—	non-album singles
"Ay Ay Chug a Chug"	1950	—	—	—	—	non-album singles
"Climb Up the Mountain"	1951	—	—	—	—	non-album singles
"Yeah Yeah Yeah"	1951	—	—	—	—	non-album singles
"The Cannonball Express"	1951	—	—	—	—	non-album singles
"He's Only Wonderful"	1951	—	—	—	—	non-album singles
"If You Turn Me Down"	1951	—	—	—	—	non-album singles
"(When I Dance with You) I Get Ideas"	1951	14	2	—	—	non-album singles
"My Magic Heart"	1951	—	—	—	—	non-album singles
"Don't Fan the Flame"(with Mel Tormé)	1951	—	—	—	—	non-album singles
"Wandering Swallow"	1951	—	—	—	—	non-album singles
"While We're Young"	1951	—	—	—	—	non-album singles
"Shame on You"	1952	—	—	—	—	non-album singles
"Ev'ry Time"	1952	—	—	—	—	non-album singles
"Be Anything (But Be Mine)" (with Gordon Jenkins and His Orchestra)	1952	21	13	—	—	non-album singles
"Lover" (with Gordon Jenkins and His Orchestra)	1952	3	—	—	—	non-album singles
"Watermelon Weather" (with Bing Crosby)	1952	28	15	—	—	non-album singles
"Just One of Those Things" (with Gordon Jenkins and His Orchestra)	1952	14	—	—	—	non-album singles
"River River" (with Gordon Jenkins and His Orchestra)	1952	23	—	—	—	non-album singles
"Merry-Go-Run-Around" (with Bing Crosby and Bob Hope)	1952	—	—	—	—	non-album singles
"I Hear the Music Now" (with Gordon Jenkins and His Orchestra)	1953	—	—	—	—	non-album singles
"Sorry Baby, You Let My Love Get Cold"	1953	—	—	—	—	non-album singles
"My Heart Belongs to Daddy"	1953	—	—	—	—	Black Coffee
"The Night Holds No Fear (For a Lover)"	1953	—	—	—	—	non-album singles
"Baubles, Bangles and Beads"	1953	30	9	—	—	non-album singles
"Ring Those Christmas Bells"	1953	—	—	—	—	non-album singles
"Where Can I Go Without You"	1954	28	—	—	—	non-album singles
"Autumn in Rome"	1954	—	—	—	—	non-album singles
"Summer Vacation"	1954	—	—	—	—	non-album singles
"Love, You Didn't Do Right by Me"	1954	—	—	—	—	non-album singles
"Snow" (with Bing Crosby, Danny Kaye and Trudy Stevens)	1954	—	—	—	—	non-album singles
"Let Me Go, Lover"	1954	26	—	—	—	non-album singles
"Straight Ahead"	1955	—	—	—	—	non-album singles
"He's a Tramp"	1955	—	—	—	—	Lady and the Tramp
"I Belong to You"	1955	—	—	—	—	non-album single
"Bella Notte"	1955	—	—	—	—	Lady and the Tramp
"Ooh That Kiss"	1955	—	—	—	—	non-album single
"He Needs Me"	1955	—	—	—	—	Songs from Pete Kelly's Blues
"Sugar (That Sugar Baby of Mine)"	1955	—	—	—	—	Songs from Pete Kelly's Blues
"Pablo Pasablo"	1955	—	—	—	—	non-album singles
"Mr. Wonderful"	1956	14	10	—	5	non-album singles
"The Come Back"	1956	—	—	—	—	non-album singles
"Joey, Joey, Joey"	1956	76	—	—	—	non-album singles
"We Laughed at Love"	1956	—	—	—	—	non-album singles
"You Oughtta Be Mine"	1956	—	—	—	—	non-album singles
"Where Flamingos Fly"	1956	—	—	—	—	non-album singles
"Every Night"	1957	—	—	—	—	non-album singles
"Listen to the Rockin' Bird"	1957	—	—	—	—	non-album singles
"Johnny Guitar"	1958	—	—	—	—	non-album singles
"Never Mind"	1958	—	—	—	—	non-album singles
"Fever"	1958	8	2	11	5	non-album singles
"Light of Love"	1958	63	55	30	—	non-album singles
"Alright, Okay, You Win"	1958	68	—	28	—	Things Are Swingin'
"Hallelujah, I Love Him So"	1959	77	—	—	—	non-album single
"You Came a Long Way from St. Louis" (with George Shearing)	1959	—	—	—	—	Beauty and the Beat!
"You Deserve"	1959	—	—	—	—	non-album single
"The Tree"	1959	—	—	—	—	Christmas Carousel
"—" denotes a recording that did not chart or was not released in that territory.

=== 1960s ===
List of singles, with selected chart positions, showing other relevant details
Title	Year	Peak chart positions						Album
Title	Year	US	US AC	AUS	CAN	CAN AC	UK	Album
"Heart"	1960	—	—	41	—	—	—	Latin ala Lee!
"I'm Gonna Go Fishin'"	1960	—	—	—	—	—	—	non-album single
"I Like a Sleighride (Jingle Bells)"	1960	—	—	—	—	—	—	Christmas Carousel
"Bucket of Tears"	1960	—	—	—	—	—	—	non-album single
"Till There Was You"	1961	—	—	—	—	—	30	Latin ala Lee!
"Yes Indeed!"	1961	—	—	—	—	—	—	non-album singles
"Hey, Look Me Over"	1961	—	—	—	—	—	—	non-album singles
"The Sweetest Sounds"	1962	—	—	—	—	—	—	Sugar 'n' Spice
"Tell All the World About You"	1962	—	—	—	—	—	—	Sugar 'n' Spice
"I'm a Woman"	1962	54	—	79	—	—	—	I'm a Woman
"The Alley Cat Song"	1963	—	—	—	—	—	—	I'm a Woman
"A Doodlin' Song"	1963	—	—	88	—	—	—	non-album single
"A Lot of Livin' to Do"	1964	—	—	—	—	—	—	In Love Again!
"In the Name of Love"	1964	— (Note: "In the Name of Love" did not enter the Hot 100, but peaked at number 32 on Bubbling Under Hot 100 Singles, which acts as a 25-song extension of the Hot 100.)	—	—	—	—	—	In the Name of Love
"After You've Gone"	1964	—	—	—	—	—	—	In the Name of Love
"Pass Me By"	1964	93	20	—	—	—	—	Pass Me By
"Bewitched"	1965	—	—	—	—	—	—	Pass Me By
"The Shadow of Your Smile"	1965	—	—	—	—	—	—	Then Was Then – Now Is Now!
"I Go to Sleep"	1965	—	—	—	—	—	—	Then Was Then – Now Is Now!
"Free Spirits"	1965	—	29	—	—	—	—	Then Was Then – Now Is Now!
"Big Spender"	1965	—	9	—	—	—	—	Big $pender
"That Man"	1966	—	31	—	—	—	—	Big $pender
"You've Got Possibilities"	1966	—	36	—	—	—	—	Big $pender
"Happy Feet"	1966	—	—	—	—	—	—	non-album single
"So, What's New"	1966	—	20	—	—	—	—	Extra Special!
"I Feel It"	1967	—	8	—	—	—	—	non-album single
"Reason to Believe"	1968	—	—	—	—	—	—	2 Shows Nightly
"It'll Never Happen Again"	1968	—	—	—	—	—	—	non-album single
"Spinning Wheel"	1969	—	24	—	—	—	—	A Natural Woman
"Is That All There Is?"	1969	11	1	62	6	1	—	Is That All There Is?
"Whistle for Happiness"	1969	—	13	—	77	19	—	Is That All There Is?
"—" denotes a recording that did not chart or was not released in that territory.

=== 1970s–1990s ===
List of singles, with selected chart positions, showing other relevant details
Title	Year	Peak chart positions				Album
Title	Year	US Bubb	US AC	CAN AC	UK	Album
"Love Story"	1970	5	26	25	—	Is That All There Is?
"You'll Remember Me"	1970	—	16	—	—	Bridge over Troubled Water
"One More Ride on the Merry-Go-Round"	1970	—	21	—	—	Make It with You
"Where Did They Go"	1971	—	—	—	—	Where Did They Go
"Love Song"	1972	—	34	21	—	Norma Deloris Egstrom from Jamestown, North Dakota
"Let's Love"	1974	—	22	41	—	Let's Love
"Some Cats Know"	1975	—	—	—	—	Mirrors
"I've Got Them Feelin' Too-Good Today Blues"	1975	—	—	—	—	Mirrors
"Lover" (re-recording)	1977	—	—	—	—	Peggy
"Can't Think Straight" (with Gilbert O'Sullivan)	1992	—	—	—	—	non-album singles
"Fever" (reissued)	1992	—	—	—	75	non-album singles
"—" denotes a recording that did not chart or was not released in that territory.

== Promotional singles ==
List of promotional singles, showing all relevant details
Title	Year	Album	Ref.
"Baby (Is What She Calls Me)"	1948	non-album singles	
"Whee Baby"	1960	non-album singles	
"Hey There"	1960	Latin ala Lee!	
"Fantástico"	1960	Olé ala Lee!	
"Dance Only with Me"	1960	Latin ala Lee!	
"On the Street Where You Live"	1960	Latin ala Lee!	
"Goin' to Chicago Blues"	1962	Blues Cross Country	
"Mack the Knife"	1963	I'm a Woman	
"Mohair Sam"	1970	Guitars a là Lee	
"We Be Friends" (featuring The Carpenter Avenue Elementary School Chorus)	1990	—N/a	
"Everybody Needs a Santa Claus" (featuring Dom DeLuise and The Carpenter Avenue Elementary School Chorus)	1990	—N/a	
"Yes, Indeed (Live On The Ed Sullivan Show, November 7, 1965)" (with The Righteous Brothers)	2020	—N/a	
"(You Make Me Feel Like) A Natural Woman [Live On The Ed Sullivan Show, April 6, 1969]"	2020	—N/a	
"The Best Is Yet to Come (Live On The Ed Sullivan Show, December 9, 1962)"	2020	—N/a	
"Who's Gonna Pay the Check?"	2020	—N/a	
"The More I See You (Live On The Ed Sullivan Show, October 1, 1967)"	2021	—N/a	
"Something (Live On The Ed Sullivan Show, March 1, 1970)"	2021	—N/a	
"Big Spender (Alex Goose & Tyler Demorest Remix)"	2023	—N/a	

== Other charted songs ==
List of songs, with selected chart positions, showing other relevant details
Title	Year	Peak chart positions			Album	Notes
Title	Year	US	US AC	AUS	Album	Notes
"I'm Glad I Waited for You"	1946	24	—	—	non-album singles	(Note: Released as the B-side to the single "Waitin' for the Train to Come In".)
"All Dressed Up with a Broken Heart"	1947	21	—	—	non-album singles	(Note: Released as the B-side to the single "Mañana (Is Soon Enough for Me)".)
"Talking to Myself About You"	1948	23	—	—	non-album singles	(Note: Released as the B-side to the single "Laroo, Laroo, Lili Bolero".)
"Baby Don't Be Mad at Me"	1948	21	—	—	non-album singles	(Note: Released as the B-side to the single "Caramba! It's the Samba".)
"Forgive Me"	1952	—	—	12	non-album singles	(Note: Released as the B-side to the single "Be Anything (But Be Mine)".)
"Sweetheart"	1958	98	—	—	non-album singles	(Note: Released as the B-side to the single "Light of Love".)
"My Man"	1958	81	—	—	non-album singles	(Note: Released as the B-side to the single "Alright, Okay, You Win".)
"Walking Happy"	1966	—	14	—	Extra Special!	(Note: Released as the B-side to the single "So What's New".)
"—" denotes a recording that did not chart or was not released in that territory.
