= Benny Goodman discography =

The following is a discography of American jazz clarinetist and bandleader Benny Goodman (1909–1986).

== Selected albums ==
- 1928-31 The Young Benny Goodman (Timeless Historical, ?)
- 1931-35 Benny Goodman 1931-1935 (2CD) (Timeless Historical, ?)
- 1934 Bill Dodge All-star Recordings (Circle, 1999)
- 1935 Original Benny Goodman Trio and Quartet Sessions, Vol. 1: After You've Gone (RCA Bluebird, 1987 Lp-1998 CD)
- 1935 Stomping at the Savoy (RCA Bluebird, 1992)
- 1935-36 Sing, Sing, Sing (RCA Bluebird, 1987)
- 1936-38 Air Play (Doctor Jazz, 1985)
- 1937 Sing, Sing, Sing (With a Swing) (Columbia, )
- 1937 Roll 'Em, Vol. 1 (Columbia, 1987)
- 1937 Roll 'Em, Vol. 2 (Columbia, 1987)
- 1937/38 Jazz Concert No. 2 (Columbia, 1952)
- 1937-38 The Benny Goodman Treasure Chest (3xLp) (MGM, 1959) Orchestra, trio and quartet
- 1938 Don't Be That Way (Columbia 1938)
- 1938-39 From Spirituals to Swing (2xLp) (Vanguard, 1959)
- 1938 The Famous 1938 Carnegie Hall Jazz Concert Vols. 1–3 (Columbia, 1950) reissued as Carnegie Hall Jazz Concert '38 (1998), Live at Carnegie Hall (2xLp) (CBS, 1999) Carnegie Hall_The Complete Concert (Jasmine, 2006) and other times
- 1939 And The Angels Sing (VICTOR 26170-A)
- 1939-41 The Benny Goodman Sextet Featuring Charlie Christian: 1939–1941 (Columbia/Legacy, 1989)
- 1939-41 Benny Goodman's Sextet (Columbia, 1944)
- 1940 Presents Eddie Sauter Arrangements (Columbia, 1953)
- 1946 Benny Goodman Sextet Session (Columbia, 1947) (4×Shellac, 10", 78 RPM, Album)
- 1947 Undercurrent Blues (Capitol, 1995)
- 1947 Mostly Sextets (Capitol, 1950)
- 1947 Easy Does It (Capitol, 1952)
- 1948 Swedish Pastry (Dragon, 1978)
- 1949 B G Dance Parade (Columbia, 1949)
- 1950 B G Dance Parade vol II (Columbia, 1950) Reissued as B G at the Ballroom (Columbia, 1955)
- 1950 Session for Six (Capitol, 1950)
- 1951 The Benny Goodman Trio Plays Plays For F H (Columbia, 1951)
- 1954 BG in Hi-Fi (Capitol, 1955)
- ??? Peggy Lee Sings with Benny Goodman (Harmony, 1957)
- 1958 Benny Rides Again (Chess,1960) With Orchestra and Quintet
- 1958 Plays World Favorites In High Fidelity (Westinghouse Broadcasting Company,1958)
- 1958 Benny in Brussels Vols 1 and 2 (Columbia, 1958)
- 1959 In Stockholm 1959 (Phontastic, 1988)
- ???? The Hits of Benny Goodman (Capitol Records, 1961)
- 1962 Benny Goodman in Moscow (RCA Victor, 1962)
- 1969 London Date (Phillips, 1969)
- 1970 Benny Goodman Today (2xLp) (London, 1970)
- 1978 Benny Goodman Live at Carnegie Hall: 40th Anniversary Concert (1978)
- 1981 Live in Hamburg 1981 (Stockfisch, 2019)
- 1936-63 The Yale University Music Library, Vols. 1-12 (Musical Heritage Society, 1988-1995)
- 1935-38 The Complete RCA Victor Small Group Recordings (3xCD) (RCA Victor, 1997)
- 1950 Lausanne 1950_Swiss Radio Days Theatre De Beaulieu, May 13, 1950 (/TCB, 2005)

=== Anthologies ===
- 1937-39 The Great Benny Goodman (Columbia, 1956)
- 1939-5216 Most Requested Songs (Columbia/Legacy, 1993)
- 1935-39 This Is Benny Goodman (2xlp) (RCA Victor, 1971)
- 1935-39 Benny Goodman – A Legendary Performer (RCA, 1977)
- 1935–39 And His Orchestra 1935–1939 (Giants of Jazz, 1990)
- 1941–55 His Orchestra and His Combos 1941–1955 (Giants of Jazz, 1990)
- 1941-58 Swing into Spring (Columbia, 1958)

=== Classical music ===
- 1938 Mozart Clarinet Quintet, with the Budapest String Quartet (RCA Victor, 1938)
- 1956 Mozart Clarinet Concerto with the Boston Symphony Orchestra (1956)
- 1968 Weber Clarinet Concertos Nos. 1 and 2 with the Chicago Symphony (RCA, 1968)

== Selected singles ==
Title	Year	Peak positions		Notes	Album
Title	Year	US	AUS	Notes	Album
"Sing, Sing, Sing"	1938				A Symposium of Swing
"Elmer's Tune" c/w "The Birth of the Blues"	1941	—	—	and his orchestra; vocal chorus by Peggy Lee	non-album singles
"I Got It Bad (and That Ain't Good)"	1941	25	—	and his orchestra; vocal chorus by Peggy Lee	non-album singles
"Let's Do It (Let's Fall in Love)" c/w "The Earl"	1941	—	—	and his orchestra; vocal chorus by Peggy Lee	non-album singles
"Shady Lady Bird" c/w "Buckle Down Winsocki"	1941	—	—	and his orchestra; vocal chorus by Peggy Lee	non-album singles
"Somebody Else Is Taking My Place"	1941	5	—	and his orchestra; vocal chorus by Peggy Lee	non-album singles
"Winter Weather"	1941	24	—	and his orchestra; vocal chorus by Peggy Lee and Art London	non-album singles
"How Long Has This Been Going On?" c/w "Clarinet a La King"	1942	—	—	and his orchestra; vocal chorus by Peggy Lee	non-album singles
"Blues in the Night"	1942	20	—	and his sextet; vocal chorus by Peggy Lee and Lou McGarity	non-album singles
"Somebody Nobody Loves" c/w "Let's Give Love a Chance"	1942	—	—	and his orchestra; vocal chorus by Peggy Lee	non-album singles
"The Lamp of Memory" c/w "When the Roses Bloom Again"	1942	—	—	and his orchestra; vocal chorus by Peggy Lee	non-album singles
"Jersey Bounce" (c/w "A String of Pearls")	1942	1	—		non-album singles
"My Little Cousin"	1942	14	—	and his orchestra; vocal chorus by Peggy Lee	non-album singles
"We'll Meet Again"	1942	16	—	and his orchestra; vocal chorus by Peggy Lee	non-album singles
"Not Mine" c/w "If You Build a Better Mousetrap"	1942	—	—	and his orchestra; vocal chorus by Peggy Lee	non-album singles
"Full Moon"	1942	22	—	and his orchestra; vocal chorus by Peggy Lee	non-album singles
"The Way You Look Tonight"	1942	21	—	and his orchestra; vocal chorus by Peggy Lee	non-album singles
"On the Sunny Side of the Street" c/w "All I Need Is You"	1942	—	—	and his sextet with Peggy Lee	non-album singles
"Why Don't You Do Right?" c/w "Six Flats Unfurnished"	1942	4	12	and his orchestra; vocal chorus by Peggy Lee	non-album singles
"Taking a Chance on Love" (re-issue) c/w "Cabin in the Sky"	1943	1		and his orchestra; vocal chorus by Helen Forrest	non-album singles
"How Deep Is the Ocean" c/w "My Old Flame"	1944	—	—	and his orchestra; vocal chorus by Peggy Lee	non-album singles
"Symphony" c/w "My Guy's Come Back"	1945	5		and his orchestra; vocal chorus by Liza Morrow	non-album singles
"For Every Man There's a Woman"	1948	25	—	and his orchestra with Peggy Lee	non-album singles
"Somebody Else Is Takin' My Place" (re-issue) c/w "Why Don't You Do Right"	1948	30	—	and his orchestra with Peggy Lee	Benny Goodman Dance Parade
