= The Complete RCA Victor Small Group Recordings =

Compilation album by Benny Goodman
- Released: September 5, 1997
- Recorded: July 11, 1935 – April 6, 1939
- Genre: Jazz, Swing
- Length: 207:38
- Label: RCA Victor; 68764

The Complete RCA Victor Small Group Recordings is a 1997 compilation 3-CD set of sessions led by jazz clarinetist Benny Goodman, and recorded for the RCA Victor label between 1935 and 1939.

== Reception ==
Professional ratings
Review scores
Source	Rating
Allmusic	4.5/5 stars
Penguin Guide to Jazz	4/4 stars

Writing for Allmusic, reviewer Scott Yanow described this set: "Classic music with many exciting moments from the King of Swing and his famous sidemen". JazzTimes writer Jack Sohmer stated: "From a strictly musical point of view, the importance of these recordings cannot be overestimated. Goodman was then, as he is still now remembered, the prevailing master of swinging, inventive, hot clarinet and he had found ideal partners from the beginning". The Penguin Guide to Jazz identified the compilation as part of its suggested "Core Collection" of essential jazz albums.

== Track listing ==
Disc One:

1. "After You've Gone" (Henry Creamer, Turner Layton) – 2:45
2. "After You've Gone" [Alternate Take] (Creamer, Layton) – 2:45
3. "Body and Soul" (Frank Eyton, Johnny Green, Edward Heyman, Robert Sour) – 3:28
4. "Body and Soul" [Alternate Take] (Eyton, Green, Heyman, Sour) – 3:23
5. "Who?" (Otto Harbach, Oscar Hammerstein II, Jerome Kern) – 3:12
6. "Someday, Sweetheart" (Reb Spikes, John Spikes) – 2:47
7. "China Boy" (Phil Boutelje, Dick Winfree) – 2:31
8. "More Than You Know" (Edward Eliscu, Billy Rose, Vincent Youmans) – 3:13
9. "All My Life" (Sidney D. Mitchell, Sam H. Stept) – 3:12
10. "Oh, Lady Be Good" (George Gershwin, Ira Gershwin) – 3:00
11. "Nobody's Sweetheart" (Ernie Erdman, Gus Kahn, Billy Meyers, Elmer Schoebel) – 2:45
12. "Too Good to Be True" (Clay Boland) – 3:28
13. "Moonglow" (Eddie DeLange, Will Hudson, Irving Mills) – 3:23
14. "Moonglow" [Alternate Take] (DeLange, Hudson, Mills) – 3:11
15. "Dinah" (Harry Akst, Sam M. Lewis, Joe Young) – 2:39
16. "Exactly Like You" (Dorothy Fields, Jimmy McHugh) – 3:16
17. "Vibraphone Blues" (Lionel Hampton) – 3:20
18. "Sweet Sue, Just You" (Will J. Harris, Victor Young) – 3:16
19. "Sweet Sue, Just You" [Alternate Take] (Harris, Young) – 3:24
20. "My Melancholy Baby" (Ernie Burnett, George Norton) – 3:24
21. "Tiger Rag" (Original Dixieland Jass Band) – 2:59

Disc Two:

1. "Stompin' at the Savoy" (Benny Goodman, Andy Razaf, Edgar Sampson, Chick Webb) – 3:17
2. "Stompin' at the Savoy" [Alternate Take] (Goodman, Razaf, Sampson, Webb) – 2:47
3. "Whispering" (Richard Coburn, Vincent Rose, John Schoenberger) – 3:21
4. "Tiger Rag" [Alternate Take] (Original Dixieland Jass Band) – 3:21
5. "Tiger Rag" [Alternate Take 2] (Original Dixieland Jass Band) – 3:18
6. "Ida! Sweet as Apple Cider" (Eddie Leonard, Eddie Munson) – 3:45
7. "Tea for Two" (Irving Caesar, Vincent Youmans) – 3:05
8. "Runnin' Wild" (Arthur Harrington Gibbs, Joe Grey, Leo Wood) – 2:37
9. "Avalon" (Buddy DeSylva, Al Jolson, Vincent Rose) – 2:50
10. "Avalon" [Alternate Take] (DeSylva, Jolson, Rose) – 2:44
11. "Handful of Keys" (Fats Waller) – 2:21
12. "Handful of Keys" [Alternate Take] (Waller) – 2:26
13. "The Man I Love" (George Gershwin, Ira Gershwin) – 3:26
14. "Smiles" (J. Will Callahan, Lee S. Roberts) – 2:59
15. "Liza (All the Clouds'll Roll Away)" (George Gershwin, Ira Gershwin, Gus Kahn) – 3:23
16. "Where or When" (Lorenz Hart, Richard Rodgers) – 3:22
17. "Silhouetted in the Moonlight" (Johnny Mercer, Richard A. Whiting) – 2:56
18. "Vieni, Vieni, Vieni" (Vincent Scotto) – 2:51
19. "Vieni, Vieni, Vieni" [Alternate Take] (Scotto) – 2:49
20. "I'm a Ding Dong Daddy (From Dumas)" (Phil Baxter) – 2:43
21. "I'm a Ding Dong Daddy (From Dumas)" [Alternate Take] (Baxter) – 2:40
22. "Bei Mir Bist Du Schön, Part 1" (Sammy Cahn, Saul Chaplin, Jacob Jacobs, Sholom Secunda) – 3:21
23. "Bei Mir Bist Du Schön, Part 1" [Alternate Take] (Cahn, Chaplin, Jacobs, Secunda) – 3:25
24. "Bei Mir Bist Du Schön, Part 2" (Cahn, Chaplin, Jacobs, Secunda) – 3:23

Disc Three:

1. "Sweet Lorraine" (Cliff Burwell, Mitchell Parish) – 3:49
2. "The Blues in Your Flat" (Hampton) – 2:32
3. "The Blues in Your Flat" [Alternate Take] (Hampton) – 2:31
4. "The Blues in My Flat" [Alternate Take 2] (Hampton) – 3:23
5. "Sugar" (Edna Alexander, Sidney D. Mitchell, Maceo Pinkard) – 3:48
6. "Sugar" [Alternate Take] (Alexander, Mitchell, Pinkard) – 3:48
7. "Dizzy Spells" (Benny Goodman, Lionel Hampton, Teddy Wilson) – 3:16
8. "Opus 1/2" (Goodman, Hampton) – 3:22
9. "I Must Have That Man!" (Fields, McHugh) – 3:23
10. "Sweet Georgia Brown" (Ben Bernie, Kenneth Casey, Pinkard) – 3:04
11. "'S Wonderful" (George Gershwin, Ira Gershwin) – 3:23
12. "'S Wonderful" [Alternate Take] (Gershwin, Gershwin) – 3:26
13. "Pick-A-Rib, Part 1" (Goodman, Hampton) – 2:53
14. "Pick-A-Rib, Part 2" (Goodman, Hampton) – 2:55
15. "Pick-A-Rib, Part 1" [Alternate Take] (Goodman, Hampton) – 2:56
16. "Pick-A-Rib, Part 2" [Alternate Take] (Goodman, Hampton) – 2:06
17. "I Cried for You" (Gus Arnheim, Arthur Freed, Abe Lyman) – 3:17
18. "I Cried for You" [Alternate Take] (Arnheim, Freed, Lyman) – 3:21
19. "I Know That You Know" (Anne Caldwell, Vincent Youmans) – 3:01
20. "I Know That You Know" [Alternate Take] (Caldwell, Youmans) – 3:02
21. "Opus 3/4" (Goodman, Hampton) – 2:53
22. "Opus 3/4" [Alternate Take] (Goodman, Hampton) – 2:58

== Personnel ==
- Benny Goodman – clarinet
- Teddy Wilson, Jess Stacy – piano
- Gene Krupa, Dave Tough, Buddy Schutz – drums
- Lionel Hampton – vibraphone
- John Kirby – bass
- Ziggy Elman – trumpet
- Helen Ward, Martha Tilton – vocals

== See also ==
- Original Benny Goodman Trio and Quartet Sessions, Vol. 1: After You've Gone - earlier 1987 reissue of some of these recordings
