= The Benny Goodman Treasure Chest =

Box set by Benny Goodman
- Released: 1959
- Recorded: 1937–1938
- Genre: Jazz
- Label: MGM

The Benny Goodman Treasure Chest is a jazz album by Benny Goodman, released in 1959. This three-LP Record Box Set was released by MGM Records These are Performance Recordings 1937–1938 by the original orchestra, trio, and quartet featuring Benny Goodman (clarinet) with Harry James/Ziggy Elman/Chris Griffin (trumpet), Murray McEachern/Red Ballard/Vernon Brown (trombone), Lionel Hampton (vibes), Teddy Wilson/Jess Stacy (piano), Hymie Shertzer/Vido Musso/Jerry Jerome/George Koenig/Dave Matthews/Arthur Rollini/Babe Russin (sax), Harry Goodman/Artie Bernstein (bass), Charlie Christian/Allan Reuss (guitar) and Gene Krupa/Dave Tough/Nick Fatool (drums).

== Track listing ==
- "Camel Hop"
- "Handful of Keys"
- "AC/DC Current"
- "Smiles"
- "So Rare"
- "Alexander's Ragtime Band"
- "I've Got My Love to Keep Me Warm"
- "Twilight in Turkey"
- "Remember"
- "Some of These Days"
- "Sleepy Time Down South"
- "Chloe"
- "Hallelujah"
- "Marie"
- "Avalon
- "If Dreams Come True"
- "Nobody's Sweetheart Now"
- "I Got Rhythm"
- "Big John's Special"
- "Remember Me"
- "Bach Goes to Town"
- "Limehouse Blues"
- "Space Man"
- "Honeysuckle Rose"
- "Swing Low, Sweet Chariot"
- "Dear Old Southland"
- "When Buddha Smiles"
- "Diga Diga Do"
- "Whispers in the Dark"
- "Madhouse"
- "Three Little Words"
- "I Surrender, Dear"
- "Chicago"
- "Tea for Two"
- "Can't We Be Friends"
- "I Know That You Know"
