= When My Baby Smiles at Me =

When My Baby Smiles at Me may refer to:

- When My Baby Smiles at Me (film), a 1948 musical film by 20th Century Fox
- "When My Baby Smiles at Me" (song), a 1920 song by Bill Munro
