= Pass Me By =

Pass Me By may refer to:

- Pass Me By (album), by Peggy Lee, 1965
- "Pass Me By" (R5 song), 2013
- "Pass Me By (If You're Only Passing Through)", a song by Johnny Rodriguez, 1972; covered by Janie Fricke, 1980
- "Pass Me By" (song from Father Goose), a song written by Cy Coleman and Carolyn Leigh for the film Father Goose, 1964
- "Pass Me By", a song by Insane Clown Posse from The Great Milenko, 1997
- "Pass Me By", a song by Dinah Jane from Dinah Jane 1, 2019

== See also ==
- "Don't Pass Me By", a 1968 song by the Beatles
