= Peggy Lee Sings with Benny Goodman =

Compilation album by Peggy Lee and Benny Goodman
- Released: 1957
- Genre: Jazz
- Length: 30:00
- Label: Harmony

Professional ratings
Review scores
Source	Rating
AllMusic	3/5 stars

Peggy Lee Sings with Benny Goodman is a jazz album by Peggy Lee backed by Benny Goodman, released in 1957.

== History ==
The album contains Peggy Lee's early recordings with the Benny Goodman orchestra, made in 1941 through 1943. The "Harmony" LP, released in 1957, was a reissue of the 1952 Columbia EP, which had contained four songs: That Did It Marie, My Old Flame, Elmer's Tune, and We'll Meet Again. Neither the EP nor the LP contains Peggy Lee's first hit with the Goodman orchestra, "Somebody Else Is Taking My Place".

== CD release ==
A CD version of the album was released on CBS Records in 1988. It includes the following songs:

1. "How Long Has This Been Going On?" (George Gershwin, Ira Gershwin)
2. "That Did It, Marie" (Irene Higginbotham, Fred Meadows)
3. "Elmer's Tune" (Elmer Albrecht, Dick Jurgens, Sammy Gallop)
4. "I Threw a Kiss in the Ocean" (Irving Berlin)
5. "We'll Meet Again" (Ross Parker, Hughie Charles}
6. "My Old Flame" (Sam Coslow, Arthur Johnston)
7. "That’s the Way It Goes" (Morris Levy, Don Parker, credited on the disc to “S. Robin, Wilder”)
8. "All I Need Is You" (Benny Davis, Peter De Rose, Mitchell Parish)
9. "Not a Care in the World" (Vernon Duke, John Latouche)
10. "Full Moon (Noche de luna)" (Gonzalo Curiel, Marcelene Odette, Bob Russell)
