= It's All Over Now (disambiguation) =

"It's All Over Now" can refer to:

- "It's All Over Now", a 1964 song by Bobby Womack and Shirley Womack
- "It's All Over Now" (Peggy Lee song), 1946
- "It's All Over Now, Baby Blue", a 1965 song by Bob Dylan
- "It's All Over Now", a song by Blackfoot from the album After the Reign
