= Airplay (disambiguation) =

Airplay is how frequently a song is played on the radio.

Airplay may also refer to:

- AirPlay, a protocol developed by Apple Inc. that allows wireless streaming of media
- Airplay (band), a short-lived American band, formed by David Foster and Jay Graydon
- Airplay SDK, now Marmalade, a cross-platform game framework for mobile devices
- Airplay, a special edition of the Citroën C1
- Air Play, a jazz compilation album by Benny Goodman
- Play (airline), a defunct Icelandic airline
