= Eddie Edwards (musician) =

American jazz trombonist (1891–1963)

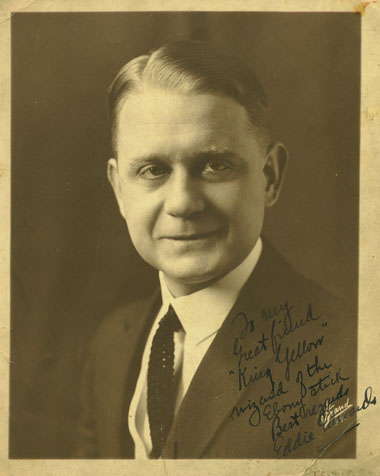
- Edwin B. Edwards, c. 1921

Background information
- Born: Edwin Branford Edwards; May 22, 1891; New Orleans, Louisiana, U.S.
- Died: April 9, 1963 (aged 71) New Orleans
- Genre: Jazz
- Occupation: Musician
- Instrument: Trombone
- Formerly of: Original Dixieland Jass Band

Edwin Branford Edwards (May 22, 1891 – April 9, 1963) was an early jazz trombonist who was a member of the Original Dixieland Jass Band.

== Life and career ==
A native of New Orleans, Louisiana, Edwards started on violin at age 10 and moved to trombone five years later. He played both instruments professionally with the bands of Papa Jack Laine and Ernest Giardina. In addition to music, Edwards played minor-league baseball and worked as an electrician.

In 1916, he was picked by Alcide Nunez to go to Chicago, Illinois, to play trombone with Johnny Stein's Jazz Band. With a few changes of personnel, this band became the Original Dixieland Jazz Band, which made the first jazz records in 1917. He played on one of the first commercially released jazz recordings, "Livery Stable Blues", later released as "Barnyard Blues".

He left the band after being drafted into the United States Army. The band replaced him with Emile Christian. Edwards served in the Army from July 1918 to March 1919. After being discharged, he led a band of his own and worked in the band of Jimmie Durante before returning to the Original Dixieland Jazz Band. After that band broke up, he again led a band in New York City for most of the 1920s. In the early 1930s, he retired from music and ran a newspaper stand and worked as a sports coach.

He returned to music in 1936 when Nick LaRocca reformed the Original Dixieland Jazz Band, playing with them until 1938. He played in other bands with Larry Shields, Tony Sbarbaro, and J. Russel Robinson in New York into the 1940s. He continued playing professionally intermittently until shortly before his death in New York City in 1963.

His composition "Sensation Rag", or "Sensation", was performed at the 1938 Benny Goodman jazz concert at Carnegie Hall and was included on the album The Famous 1938 Carnegie Hall Jazz Concert.

Jazz musician Johnny Wiggs said that, while he'd heard more sophisticated trombone players, he'd "never heard another tromboner[sic] who could give a band the rhythmic punch that Edwards could."

== Grammy Hall of Fame ==
"Darktown Strutters' Ball" (1917) by the Original Dixieland Jazz Band was inducted into the Grammy Hall of Fame in 2006.

== Sources ==
- Tim Gracyk's Phonographs and Old Records
- RedHotJazz.com Contains audio files of their vintage recordings
- Brunn, H.O. The Story of the Original Dixieland Jazz Band. Baton Rouge: Louisiana State University Press, 1960. Reprinted by Da Capo Press, 1977. ISBN 0-306-70892-2
- Gracyk, Tim, Frank Hoffmann, and B. Lee Cooper. Popular American Recording Pioneers: 1895-1925. (Haworth Popular Culture). Routledge, 2000.
- Lange, Horst H. Wie der Jazz begann: 1916-1923, von der "Original Dixieland Jazz Band" bis zu King Olivers "Creole Jazz Band". Berlin: Colloquium Verlag, 1991. ISBN 3-7678-0779-3
- Stewart, Jack. "The Original Dixieland Jazz Band's Place in the Development of Jazz." New Orleans International Music Colloquium, 2005.
