= Light of Love (disambiguation) =

Light of Love is a 1974 album by T. Rex.

Light of Love may also refer to:

- "Light of Love" (Peggy Lee song), 1958
- "Light of Love" (T. Rex song), 1974
- "Light of Love", a 2020 single by Florence and the Machine
