= Sensation Rag =

1918 song by the Original Dixieland Jazz Band

- Victor 78, 18483-B

Single by Original Dixieland Jazz Band
- A-side: "Bluin' the Blues"
- Published: 1918
- Released: September 1918
- Recorded: June 25, 1918
- Genre: Jazz
- Length: 2:59
- Label: Victor
- Songwriter: Eddie Edwards

"Sensation Rag" or "Sensation" is a 1918 jazz instrumental by the Original Dixieland Jazz Band. It is one of the earliest jazz recordings. It is not related to Joseph Lamb's 1908 "Sensation Rag", which is a ragtime piano piece.

== Background ==
The instrumental was recorded on June 25, 1918, in New York as a one-step and was released as a single on RCA Victor as Victor 18483 with "Bluin' the Blues" as the flip side. It was composed by Eddie Edwards, the trombonist in the Original Dixieland Jazz Band.

== Other recordings ==
Bix Beiderbecke recorded the instrumental "Sensation" on September 16, 1924, and released as Gennett 78 single 5542 with "Lazy Daddy" as the flip side. "Sensation" was recorded by Fletcher Henderson and His Orchestra in 1927 and released on Vocalion, and by Joe Venuti's Big Four featuring Eddie Lang in 1928. "Sensation Rag" or "Sensation" was performed at the 1938 landmark Benny Goodman jazz concert at Carnegie Hall released on the album The Famous 1938 Carnegie Hall Jazz Concert. Paul Whiteman and His Orchestra released the song as a 78 single under the title "Sensation Stomp". Miff Mole, Red Nichols, Jimmy Dorsey, Fred Morrow, Arthur Schutt, Vic Berton, and The Arkansas Travelers also recorded the song. "Sensation" was also released on V Disc by the ODJB as No. 214B, VP 435, Hot Jazz, June, 1944, with Eddie Edwards and Tony Sbarbaro. Yank Lawson and His Orchestra released the song as a single as Signature 15004. Pete Fountain and Freddy Randall and His Band also recorded the song.

The song is featured in the biopic The Benny Goodman Story.

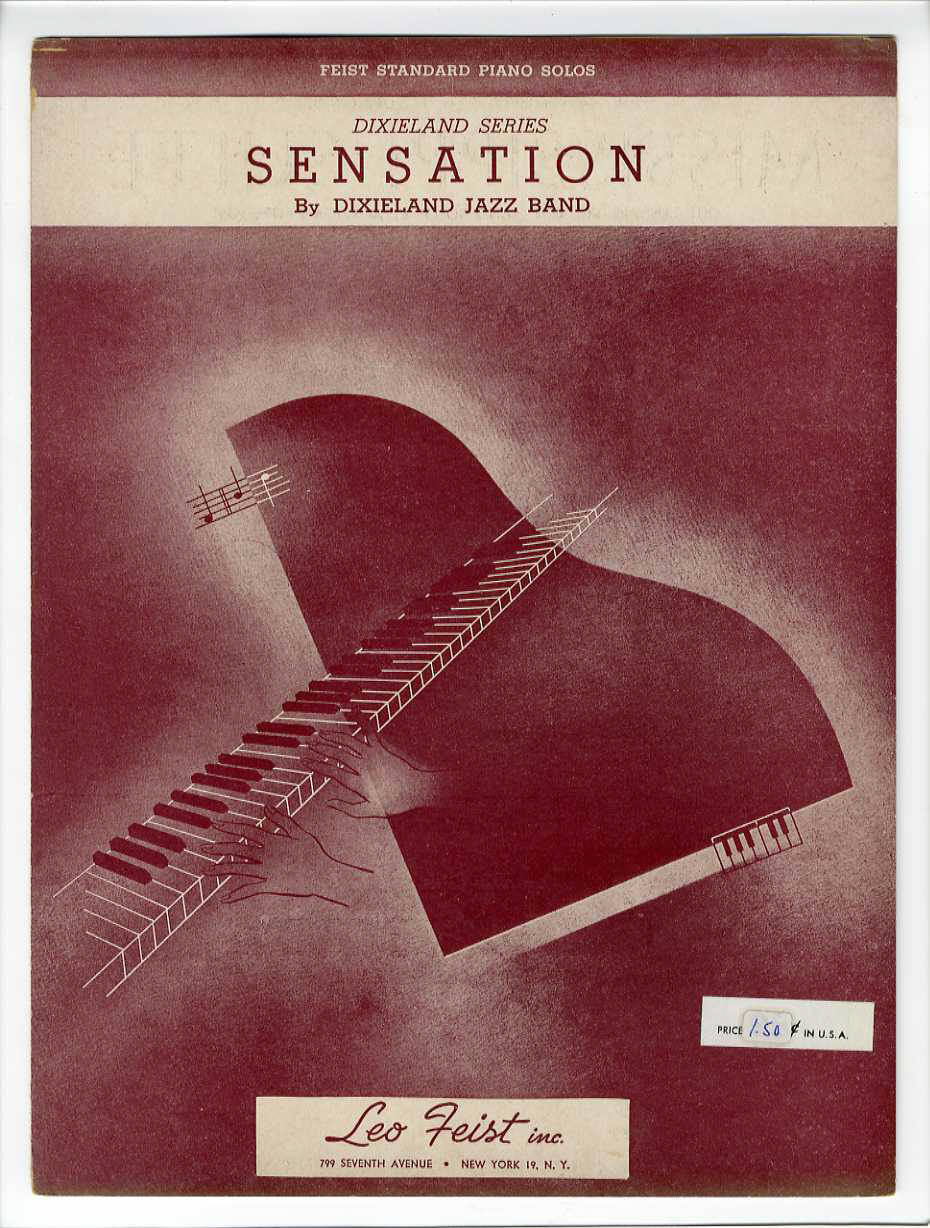
"Sensation" by Dixieland Jazz Band, sheet music cover, Leo Feist, Inc., New York.
