= Waitin' for the Train to Come In =

Single by Peggy Lee
- A-side: "Waitin' for the Train to Come In" "I'm Glad I Waited for You"
- Released: 1945
- Genre: Jazz, pop
- Label: Capitol
- Songwriters: Block; Skylar

"Waitin' for the Train to Come In" is a song written by Martin Block and Sunny Skylar that was a hit for Peggy Lee in 1945.

== Critical reception ==
Professional ratings
Review scores
| Source | Rating |
|---|---|
| Billboard | favorable |

Billboard favorably reviewed Peggy Lee's recording (Capitol 218, coupled with "I'm Glad I Waited for You") in its issue from October 20, 1945.

== Track listing ==
78 rpm (Capitol 218)

739-3A
| No. | Title | Writer(s) | Note(s) | Length |
|---|---|---|---|---|
| 1. | "Waitin' for the Train to Come In" | Block; Skylar | Peggy Lee with orchestra Guitar solo by Dave Barbour |

740-3A
| No. | Title | Writer(s) | Note(s) | Length |
|---|---|---|---|---|
| 1. | "I'm Glad I Waited for You" | Styne; Cahn | From Columbia picture Tars and Spars; Peggy Lee with orchestra Guitar solo by Dave Barbour |

== Charts ==
| Chart (1945) | Peak position |
|---|---|
| US Billboard | 5 |

== Other notable versions ==
Since its release, it has been recorded by singers such as Kitty Kallen, Helen Grayco, Louis Prima, and Monica Lewis.

- Kitty Kallen (with Harry James and his orchestra)
- Louis Prima
- Johnny Long and his orchestra (vocal by Dick Robertson)
- Monica Lewis (with Ray Bloch and his orchestra)
- Pat Kay and her Jive Bombers
- Buddy Johnson (vocal by Ella Johnson)
