= Laroo Laroo Lili Bolero =

Single by Peggy Lee with Dave Barbour and the Brazilians
- A-side: "Laroo Laroo Lili Bolero" "Talking to Myself About You"
- Released: 1948
- Label: Capitol
- Songwriters: Lippman; Dee; Moore

"Laroo Laroo Lili Bolero" is a song written by Sidney Lippman, Sylvia Dee, and Elizabeth Moore that was a hit for Peggy Lee with Dave Barbour and the Brazilians in 1948.

== Critical reception ==
Professional ratings
Review scores
| Source | Rating |
|---|---|
| Billboard | favorable |
| Billboard | 90/100 |
| Record Research | favorable |

Billboard favorably reviewed Peggy Lee's recording (Capitol 15048, coupled with "Talking to Myself About You") in its issues from March 20 and March 27, 1948, rating it 90 on a scale of 100.

== Track listing ==
78 rpm (Capitol 15048)

(2608) Y
| No. | Title | Writer(s) | Note(s) | Length |
|---|---|---|---|---|
| 1. | "Laroo Laroo Lili Bolero" | Lippman; Dee; Moore | Peggy Lee with Dave Barbour and the Brazilians; Vocal with rhumba orchestra |

(2457) Z
| No. | Title | Writer(s) | Note(s) | Length |
|---|---|---|---|---|
| 1. | "Talking to Myself About You" | Stordahl; Weston; Taylor | Peggy Lee with Dave Barbour and his orchestra Vocal with orchestra |

== Charts ==
| Chart (1948) | Peak position |
|---|---|
| US Billboard | 13 |
