= Similau (See-Me-Lo) =

Single by Peggy Lee with Dave Barbour's Afro-Cubans
- A-side: "Similau (See-Me-Lo)" "While We're Young"
- Released: 1949
- Genre: Jazz
- Label: Capitol
- Songwriters: Harry Coleman; Arden Clar

"Similau (See-Me-Lo)" is a song written by Harry Coleman and Arden Clar that was a hit for Peggy Lee with Dave Barbour's orchestra in 1949.

The song was almost simultaneously cut by many record labels and many artists.

Lee's recording was later used in Samsung's Galaxy Note 8 television advertisement.

== Critical reception ==
Professional ratings
Review scores
Source	Rating
Billboard	85/100

Billboard reviewed Peggy Lee's recording (Capitol 15416, coupled with "While We're Young") in its issue from April 9, 1949, rating it 85 on a scale of 100 and writing: "Thrush does a provocative job with this most melodic jungle chant."

== Track listing ==
78 rpm (Capitol 15416)

(3953) Y
No.	Title	Writer(s)	Note(s)	Length
1.	"Similau (See-Me-Lo)"	Harry Coleman; Arden Clar	Peggy Lee with Dave Barbour's Afro-Cubans; Vocal with orchestra

(2624) Z
No.	Title	Writer(s)	Note(s)	Length
1.	"While We're Young"	Wilder; Palitz; Engvick	Peggy Lee with instrumental accompaniment directed by Dave Barbour; Vocal with instrumental accompaniment
