= I Don't Know Enough About You (song) =

Single by Peggy Lee with Dave Barbour and his orchestra
- A-side: "I Can See It Your Way" "I Don't Know Enough About You"
- Released: 1946
- Genre: Jazz, pop
- Label: Capitol
- Songwriters: Lee; Barbour

"I Don't Know Enough About You" is a song written by Peggy Lee and Dave Barbour that was a hit for Peggy Lee with Dave Barbour and his orchestra in 1946.

== Track listing ==
78 rpm (Capitol 236)

886
| No. | Title | Writer(s) | Note(s) | Length |
|---|---|---|---|---|
| 1. | "I Can See It Your Way" | James; Miller | Peggy Lee with Dave Barbour and his orchestra |

887
| No. | Title | Writer(s) | Note(s) | Length |
|---|---|---|---|---|
| 1. | "I Don't Know Enough About You" | Lee; Barbour | Peggy Lee with Dave Barbour and his orchestra |

== Charts ==
| Chart (1946) | Peak position |
|---|---|
| US Billboard | 7 |
