= Swedish Pastry =

Live album by Benny Goodman
- Released: 1978
- Recorded: 1948
- Genre: Jazz

Professional ratings
Review scores
Source	Rating
AllMusic	4.5/5 stars

For the Bud Powell album, see At the Golden Circle.

Swedish Pastry is a live jazz album by Benny Goodman featuring recordings of Goodman and his then-newly formed septet recorded in 1948 during a two-week set at the Frank Palumbo's Click Club in Philadelphia, Pennsylvania. The septet included a young Swedish clarinetist Stan Hasselgård, tenor-saxophonist Wardell Gray, and pianist Teddy Wilson. The septet was short-lived as Hasselgård died later that year. The LP was released in 1978.

== Track listing ==
Side One
No.	Title	Writer(s)	Length
1.	"Cookin' On Up"	Mel Powell	4:01
2.	"Swedish Pastry"	Barney Kessel	3:28
3.	"All The Things You Are"	Jerome Kern	2:47
4.	"Mary's Idea"	Mary Lou Williams	4:25
5.	"Swedish Pastry"		3:30
6.	"Bye Bye, Pretty Baby"	Jack Gardner	3:50
7.	"Mary's Idea"		3:07

Side Two
No.	Title	Writer(s)	Length
1.	"Mel's Idea"	Mel Powell	5:46
2.	"Mel's Idea"		5:45
3.	"Bye Bye Blues"	Bert Lown, Chauncey Gray, Fred Hamm	4:09
4.	"Indiana"	J.F. Hanley	2:11
5.	"Swedish Pastry"		4:25
6.	"Lullaby In Rhythm"	Benny Goodman, Clarence Profit, Edgar Sampson	4:04
