= Benny Goodman Sextet Session =

Studio album by the Benny Goodman Sextet
- Released: 1946
- Label: Columbia

The Benny Goodman Sextet chronology
Benny Goodman's Sextet (1944)	Benny Goodman Sextet Session (1946)

Benny Goodman Sextet Session is a studio album by the Benny Goodman Sextet released by Columbia Records in 1946.

The album was released as a set of four 10-inch 78-rpm phonograph records (cat. no. C-113).

== Reception ==
The New Yorker wrote upon the album's release: "The Benny Goodman Sextet turns up in a Columbia album (C-113) with eight brilliantly done pieces".

The album spent three weeks at number one on Billboard's Best-Selling Popular Record Albums chart.

== Track listing ==
Set of four 10-inch 78-rpm records (Columbia set C-113)

All the tracks are marked as "fox trot".

Side 1
No.	Title	Writer(s)	Length
1.	"Tiger Rag"	Original Dixieland Jazz Band

Side 2
No.	Title	Writer(s)	Length
1.	"Ain't Misbehavin'"	Razaf–Waller–Harper

Side 3
No.	Title	Writer(s)	Note(s)	Length
1.	"She's Funny That Way"	Moret–Whiting	Vocal chorus by Jane Harvey

Side 4
No.	Title	Writer(s)	Length
1.	"I Got Rhythm" (from Girl Crazy)	I. Gershwin—G. Gershwin

Side 5
No.	Title	Writer(s)	Length
1.	"Just One of Those Things"	Cole Porter

Side 6
No.	Title	Writer(s)	Length
1.	"China Boy"	Boutelja–Winfree

Side 7
No.	Title	Writer(s)	Length
1.	"Shine"	Mack—L. Brown—Dabney

Side 8
No.	Title	Writer(s)	Length
1.	"Rachel's Dream"	Goodman

== Charts ==
Chart (1946)	Peak position
US Billboard Best-Selling Popular Record Albums	1

== See also ==
- List of Billboard Best-Selling Popular Record Albums number ones of 1946
