= The Famous 1938 Carnegie Hall Jazz Concert =

Carnegie Hall Jazz Concert

Live album by Benny Goodman
- Released: 1950
- Recorded: January 16, 1938
- Genres: Jazz; swing
- Length: Disc One 48:59; Disc Two 53:05
- Labels: Columbia; Legacy
- Producer: George Avakian (Note: "Following military service during World War II, Avakian became the head of Columbia's Popular Music division, which at the time included jazz. When the long-playing record format was introduced in 1948 Avakian seized the initiative, creating a reissue series that put the first 100 pop recordings onto a series of the new 12-inch, 33 1/3-rpm discs. In 1950, Avakian produced a record of Benny Goodman's 1938 Carnegie Hall concert—the first time a jazz orchestra played the hallowed venue—beginning a new trend of recorded live performances on which Columbia led the industry.") (Note: "In the 1950s, Avakian supervised two historic live recordings: Benny Goodman Live at Carnegie Hall 1938 and Ellington at Newport. The Goodman concert, released in 1950, was among jazz's first double albums, first live albums and first to sell a million copies.")

Benny Goodman chronology
Benny Goodman Sextet (1950)	Carnegie Hall Jazz Concert (1950)	1937/38 Jazz Concert No. 2 (1952)

The Famous 1938 Carnegie Hall Jazz Concert by Benny Goodman, Columbia Records catalogue item SL-160, is a two-disc LP of swing and jazz music recorded at Carnegie Hall in New York City on January 16, 1938. First issued in 1950, the recording captured the premiere performance given by a big band in the famed concert venue. The event has been described as "the single most important jazz or popular music concert in history: jazz's 'coming out' party to the world of 'respectable' music."

The title, mastered from preserved acetates, (Note: "The album made from the recovered acetates became one of the first 33 1/3 LPs to sell over a million copies.") was among jazz's first double albums, first live recordings, and first to sell over a million copies. One of the earliest records of Benny Goodman music issued on the then new long-playing format, the concert recording was also sold in a set of nine 45 rpm records in 1950 by Columbia. The subsequent discovery of the aluminum studio masters made from the original recording resulted in several high-quality CD reissues beginning in 1998. (Note: "The eventual discovery of the aluminum studio master recordings led to high-quality CD reissues in 1998, 2002 and 2006 of the legendary Carnegie Hall Jazz Concert.")

== The concert ==
In late 1937, Benny Goodman's publicist, Wynn Nathanson, suggested that Goodman and his band should play at the Carnegie Hall in New York City. If such a concert were to take place, then Goodman would be the first jazz bandleader to perform there. According to music historian Mike Joyce, "Benny Goodman was initially hesitant about the concert, fearing that Hot Jazz would fall flat before audiences accustomed to classical music. Hollywood Hotel, Benny's most recent film, opened to rave reviews. The giant lines of teenagers waiting outside the Paramount gave Benny the confidence to actively pursue the Carnegie Hall concert with all his faculties. He cancelled recording dates and insisted on holding rehearsals inside Carnegie Hall to familiarize the band with its acoustics."

The concert was held on the evening of January 16, 1938. It began with three contemporary numbers from the Goodman band—"Don't Be That Way", "Sometimes I'm Happy", and "One O'Clock Jump". They then played a history of jazz, starting with a Dixieland quartet performing "Sensation Rag", originally recorded by the Original Dixieland Jazz Band in 1918. The reaction of the audience, though polite, was tepid at the start but built steadily with each song. Then came a jam session on "Honeysuckle Rose" featuring members of the Count Basie and Duke Ellington bands as guests. (The surprise of the session: Goodman handing a solo to Basie's guitarist Freddie Green, who was never a featured soloist but earned his reputation as the best rhythm guitarist in the genre—he responded with a striking round of chord improvisations.) As the concert went on, things livened up. The Goodman band and quartet took over the stage and performed the numbers that had made them famous. Some later trio and quartet numbers were particularly well received, and the vocal by Martha Tilton on "Loch Lomond" provoked five curtain calls and cries for an encore. The encore forced Goodman to make his only audience announcement for the night, stating that they had no encore prepared but that Martha would return shortly with another number.

By the time the band reached the climactic piece "Sing, Sing, Sing (With a Swing)", success was assured. This performance featured playing by the tenor saxophonist Babe Russin, the trumpeter Harry James, and Goodman, backed by the drummer Gene Krupa. When Goodman finished his solo, he unexpectedly gave a solo to the pianist, Jess Stacy. "At the Carnegie Hall concert, after the usual theatrics, Jess Stacy was allowed to solo and, given the venue, what followed was appropriate," wrote David Rickert. "Used to just playing rhythm on the tune, he was unprepared for a turn in the spotlight, but what came out of his fingers was a graceful, impressionistic marvel with classical flourishes, yet still managed to swing. It was the best thing he ever did, and it's ironic that such a layered, nuanced performance came at the end of such a chaotic, bombastic tune."

The concert sold out weeks in advance, with the capacity 2,760 seats going for a top price of US$2.75 a seat (equivalent to $63 in 2025).

=== Recording ===
There is much confusion about how the live concert was recorded for posterity. At least three studios were involved in making a synchronized pair of acetates (at two, working together) and a set of aluminum masters (at the third). Although it had long been believed the sound was captured by a single overhead mic at the hall, the notes to the 1998 release by Phil Schaap claim it was not working that evening and "at least three other mics were used." The acetates became the basis for the original 1950 double-LP album release. The higher quality metal masters were used for subsequent remasters. CD reissues based on the metal masters were released in 1998, 2002 and 2006.

== Reception ==
Professional ratings
Review scores
Source	Rating
AllMusic	5/5 stars
Penguin Guide to Jazz Recordings	4/4 stars
The Rolling Stone Jazz Record Guide	5/5 stars

The original 1950 long-playing double-album was very well received. As technology improved the material was re-released in digital format, with new versions produced both in the 1980s and 1990s.

The 1999 acetate-based reissue received critical acclaim. Bruce Eder, writing for AllMusic, generally praised it, while noting the compromise between clear reproduction of sonic detail and retaining surface noise from the source material. The Penguin Guide to Jazz Recordings includes the release in its "Core Collection", in addition to giving it a perfect four-star rating. Penguin authors Richard Cook and Brian Morton describe the release as "a model effort, masterminded by Phil Schaap, whose indomitable detective work finally tracked down the original acetates and gave us the music in the best sound we'll ever get; with powerful, even thrilling, ambience."

== Track listings ==
=== Original release ===
Side one
No.	Title	Writer(s)	Length
1.	"Don't Be That Way"	Edgar Sampson, Benny Goodman, Mitchell Parish	4:23
2.	"One O'Clock Jump"	Count Basie	6:38
3.	"Sensation Rag"	Edwin "Eddie" Edwards	1:19
4.	"I'm Coming Virginia"	Will Marion Cook, Donald Heywood	2:07
5.	"When My Baby Smiles at Me"	Bill Munro, Andrew Sterling, Ted Lewis, Harry Von Tilzer	0:50
6.	"Shine"	Cecil Mack, Ford Dabney, Lew Brown	1:03
7.	"Blue Reverie"	Duke Ellington, Harry Carney	3:18
8.	"Life Goes to a Party"	Harry James, Benny Goodman	4:15

Side two
No.	Title	Writer(s)	Length
1.	"Honeysuckle Rose"	Thomas "Fats" Waller, Andy Razaf	13:55
2.	"Body and Soul"	Johnny Green, Edward Heyman, Robert Sour, Frank Eyton	3:23
3.	"Avalon"	Vincent Rose, B.G. DeSylva, Al Jolson	4:16
4.	"The Man I Love"	George Gershwin, Ira Gershwin	3:26
Total length:			48:59

Side three
No.	Title	Writer(s)	Length
1.	"I Got Rhythm"	George Gershwin, Ira Gershwin	5:09
2.	"Blue Skies"	Irving Berlin	3:18
3.	"Loch Lomond"	Traditional	2:58
4.	"Blue Room"	Richard Rodgers, Lorenz Hart	2:42
5.	"Swingtime in the Rockies"	Jimmy Mundy, Benny Goodman	2:30
6.	"Bei mir bist du schoen"	Scholom Secunda (music), Jacob Jacobs (lyrics) adapted by Sammy Cahn, Saul Chaplin	4:00
7.	"China Boy"	Dick Winfree, Phil Boutelje	4:53

Side four
No.	Title	Writer(s)	Length
1.	"Stompin' at the Savoy"	Edgar Sampson, Benny Goodman, Chick Webb	5:51
2.	"Dizzy Spells"	Benny Goodman, Lionel Hampton, Teddy Wilson	5:44
3.	"Sing Sing Sing (with a Swing)"	Louis Prima	12:08
4.	"Big John's Special"	Horace Henderson	3:48
Total length:			53:05

=== 1999 reissue ===
Disc one
No.	Title	Writer(s)	Length
1.	"Benny Goodman 1950 Introduction" (recorded 1950)		0:52
2.	"Don't Be That Way"	Edgar Sampson, Benny Goodman, Mitchell Parish	4:12
3.	"Sometimes I'm Happy"	Vincent Youmans, Irving Caesar, Clifford Grey	4:13
4.	"One O'Clock Jump"	Eddie Durham, Buster Smith	6:47
5.	"Applause; transition to Twenty Years of Jazz"		0:41
6.	"Sensation Rag"	Edwin "Eddie" Edwards	1:12
7.	"I'm Coming Virginia"	Will Marion Cook, Donald Heywood	2:15
8.	"When My Baby Smiles at Me"	Bill Munro, Andres Sterling, Ted Lewis, Harry Von Tilzer	0:52
9.	"Shine"	Cecil Mack, Ford Dabney, Lew Brown	0:55
10.	"Blue Reverie"	Duke Ellington, Harry Carney	3:32
11.	"Applause; transition back to Goodman Orchestra"		0:22
12.	"Life Goes to a Party"	Harry James, Benny Goodman	4:05
13.	"Setting up for Jam Session"		0:40
14.	"Honeysuckle Rose" (solos: Lester Young, Count Basie, Buck Clayton, Johnny Hodges, rhythm section (Basie, Freddie Green, Walter Page, Gene Krupa), Carney, Goodman, Green, James, Young, Clayton)	Thomas "Fats" Waller, Andy Razaf	16:42
15.	"Applause; setting-up & tuning-up for BG Small Groups"		1:00
16.	"Body and Soul"	Johnny Green, Edward Heyman, Robert Sour, Frank Eyton	3:10
17.	"Applause as Lionel Hampton enters"		0:27
18.	"Avalon"	Vincent Rose, B.G. DeSylva, Al Jolson	4:04
19.	"The Man I Love"	George Gershwin, Ira Gershwin	3:35
20.	"I Got Rhythm"	George Gershwin, Ira Gershwin	4:51
21.	"pause track"		0:06
Total length:			64:43

Disc two
No.	Title	Writer(s)	Length
1.	"Blue Skies"	Irving Berlin	3:14
2.	"Loch Lomond"	Traditional	3:04
3.	"Applause; Benny Goodman's 'No Encore' announcement"		1:14
4.	"Blue Room"	Richard Rodgers, Lorenz Hart	2:36
5.	"Swingtime in the Rockies"	Jimmy Mundy, Benny Goodman	2:38
6.	"Applause; Martha Tilton returns to stage"		0:21
7.	"Bei mir bist du schoen"	Scholom Secunda (music), Jacob Jacobs (lyrics) adapted by Sammy Cahn, Saul Chaplin	3:54
8.	"Applause; setting-up for BG small groups"		0:32
9.	"China Boy"	Dick Winfree, Phil Boutelje	4:45
10.	"Stompin' at the Savoy"	Edgar Sampson, Benny Goodman, Chick Webb	5:55
11.	"Applause; BG Quartet continues but changes program"		0:24
12.	"Dizzy Spells"	Benny Goodman, Lionel Hampton, Teddy Wilson	5:37
13.	"Applause; transition back to Goodman orchestra for finale"		0:41
14.	"Sing Sing Sing (with a Swing)"	Louis Prima	12:02
15.	"Applause until encores"		1:03
16.	"If Dreams Come True"	Edgar Sampson, Benny Goodman, Irving Mills	2:34
17.	"Applause for second encore"		0:21
18.	"Big John's Special"	Horace Henderson	3:41
19.	"pause track"		0:06
Total length:			54:42

Benny Goodman 1950 Tune-By-Tune Introductions
No.	Title	Length
20.	"Introduction"	0:26
21.	"Don't Be That Way"	0:18
22.	"Twenty Years of Jazz"	0:15
23.	"Blue Reverie"	0:24
24.	"Life Goes to a Party"	0:27
25.	"Body and Soul"	0:45
26.	"Avalon"	0:23
27.	"Swingtime in the Rockies"	0:17
28.	"Conclusion"	0:15
Total length:		58:12

Disc one, track 1 and disc two, tracks 20–28 are edited from comments recorded by Benny Goodman in 1950 and pressed onto a 12-inch 78 rpm record that was sent to radio station DJs at the time of the original double-album release. It was accompanied by a script suggesting ways to use it.

== Personnel ==
=== The Benny Goodman Orchestra ===
- Benny Goodman – clarinet, vocal, and leader
- Chris Griffin, Ziggy Elman, Harry James – trumpets
- Red Ballard, Vernon Brown – trombones
- George Koenig, Hymie Schertzer – alto saxophones
- Art Rollini, Babe Russin – tenor saxophones
- Jess Stacy – piano
- Allan Reuss – guitar
- Harry Goodman – bass
- Gene Krupa – drums
- Martha Tilton – vocal
- Teddy Wilson – piano (BG trio and quartet only)
- Lionel Hampton – vibraphone (BG quartet only)

=== Additional performers ===
- Buck Clayton – trumpet
- Bobby Hackett – cornet
- Cootie Williams – trumpet
- Harry Carney – baritone saxophone
- Johnny Hodges – soprano and alto saxophones
- Lester Young – tenor saxophone
- Count Basie – piano
- Freddie Green – guitar
- Walter Page – bass
