= Everything's Movin' Too Fast =

Single by Peggy Lee with Dave Barbour and his orchestra
- A-side: "It's Lovin' Time" "Everything's Movin' Too Fast"
- Released: 1947
- Label: Capitol
- Songwriters: Peggy Lee; Dave Barbour

"Everything's Movin' Too Fast" is a song written by Peggy Lee and Dave Barbour that was a hit for Peggy Lee with Dave Barbour and his orchestra in 1947.

== Critical reception ==
Professional ratings
Review scores
Source	Rating
Billboard	favorable

Billboard favorably reviewed Peggy Lee's recording (Capitol 343, coupled with "It's Lovin' Time") in its issue from January 18, 1947.

== Track listing ==
78 rpm (Capitol 343)

1530
No.	Title	Writer(s)	Note(s)	Length
1.	"It's Lovin' Time"	Chummy McGregor; Harry Harris	Peggy Lee with Dave Barbour and his orchestra

1531
No.	Title	Writer(s)	Note(s)	Length
1.	"Everything's Movin' Too Fast"	Peggy Lee; Dave Barbour	Peggy Lee with Dave Barbour and his orchestra
