= When My Baby Smiles at Me (song) =

Song
- Published: 1920
- Songwriters: Andrew B. Sterling, Ted Lewis
- Composer: Bill Munro

"When My Baby Smiles at Me" is a popular song with music by Bill Munro and words by Andrew B. Sterling and Ted Lewis, that was published by Harry Von Tilzer Music Publishing in 1920. It was interpolated into the Broadway show The Greenwich Village Follies (1919) and was the first big hit for clarinettist, vocalist and comedian Ted Lewis (1892–1971). Lewis's jazz band recording in 1920 for Columbia Records, became his signature tune, and spent 18 weeks on the charts (seven weeks at No. 1). Lewis re-recorded it several times over the years and his 1938 version for Decca also charted briefly. The tune was also covered by other artists of the time.

Benny Goodman and His Orchestra played a brief (43-second) honky-tonk version of "When My Baby Smiles at Me" during their 1938 Carnegie Hall concert.

== Appearances in films ==
- 1936 Sing, Baby Sing
- 1941 Hold That Ghost - Played during the opening credits and played by Ted Lewis and His Orchestra (as Ted Lewis' Orchestra) and sung by Lewis at the nightclub.
- 1942 Behind the Eight Ball
- 1948 When My Baby Smiles at Me

== Other notable recordings ==
- 1920 Billy Murray and Gladys Rice
- 1920 Henry Burr
- 1931 Sunny Clapp and His Band O' Sunshine
- 1956 Bing Crosby recorded it for his album Songs I Wish I Had Sung the First Time Around.
- 1959 Max Bygraves with Ted Heath for the album Max and Ted The Hits of the Twenties.
- 1960 Louis Prima and Keely Smith - included in their album Together.
- 1963 Bobby Darin recorded the song, which was released on the album The Unreleased Capitol Sides (1999).
