= Linger in My Arms a Little Longer, Baby =

Single by Peggy Lee with Dave Barbour and his orchestra
- A-side: "Linger in My Arms a Little Longer, Baby" "Baby You Can Count on Me"
- Released: 1946
- Genre: Jazz, pop
- Label: Capitol
- Songwriter: Herb Magidson

"Linger in My Arms a Little Longer, Baby" is a song written by Herb Magidson that was a hit for Peggy Lee with Dave Barbour and his orchestra in 1946.

== Critical reception ==
Professional ratings
Review scores
Source	Rating
Billboard	favorable

Billboard favorably reviewed Peggy Lee's recording (Capitol 263, coupled with "Baby You Can Count on Me") in its issue from July 6, 1946.

== Track listing ==
78 rpm (Capitol 263)

1077
No.	Title	Writer(s)	Note(s)	Length
1.	"Linger in My Arms a Little Longer, Baby"	Herb Magidson	Peggy Lee with Dave Barbour and his orchestra Guitar solo — Dave Barbour

1078
No.	Title	Writer(s)	Note(s)	Length
1.	"Baby You Can Count on Me"	Freddy Stewart	Peggy Lee with Dave Barbour and his orchestra
