= The Benny Goodman Sextet Featuring Charlie Christian: 1939–1941 =

Compilation album by Benny Goodman and Charlie Christian
- Released: 1989
- Recorded: 1939–1941
- Genre: Jazz
- Label: Columbia

Professional ratings
Review scores
Source	Rating
AllMusic	4/5 stars
The Penguin Guide to Jazz Recordings	4/4 stars

The Benny Goodman Sextet Featuring Charlie Christian: 1939–1941 is a jazz album by Benny Goodman and Charlie Christian. It was released in 1989.
