= Show Me the Way to Get Out of This World =

"Show Me the Way to Get Out of This World ('Cause That's Where Everything Is)"

Single by Peggy Lee with Dave Barbour and his orchestra
- A-side: "Show Me the Way to Get Out of This World ('Cause That's Where Everything Is)" "Happy Music"
- Released: 1950
- Label: Capitol
- Songwriters: Matt Dennis; Les Clark

"Show Me the Way to Get Out of This World ('Cause That's Where Everything Is)" is a song written by Matt Dennis and Les Clark that was a hit for Peggy Lee with Dave Barbour and his orchestra in 1950.

== Critical reception ==
Professional ratings
Review scores
Source	Rating
Billboard	83/100

Billboard favorably reviewed Peggy Lee's recording (Capitol 1105, coupled with "Happy Music") in its issue from July 29, 1950, rating it 83 on a scale of 100.

== Track listing ==
78 rpm (Capitol 1105)

6140-Y
No.	Title	Writer(s)	Note(s)	Length
1.	"Show Me the Way to Get Out of This World ('Cause That's Where Everything Is)"	Matt Dennis; Les Clark	Peggy Lee with Dave Barbour and his orchestra Vocal with orchestra	2:05

6141-Z
No.	Title	Writer(s)	Note(s)	Length
1.	"Happy Music"	Peggy Lee; Dave Barbour	Peggy Lee with Dave Barbour and his orchestra Vocal with orchestra	2:30

== Charts ==
Chart (1950)	Peak position
US Billboard Records Most Played by Disk Jockeys	28
