= Benny Goodman's Sextet =

Studio album by Benny Goodman
- Released: 1944
- Label: Columbia

Benny Goodman chronology
Benny Goodman's Sextet (1944)	Benny Goodman Sextet Session (1946)

Benny Goodman's Sextet is a studio album by Benny Goodman released by Columbia Records in 1944.

== Release ==
The album was released as a set of four 10-inch 78-rpm phonograph records (cat. no. C-102), with eight tracks across eight sides.

== Background ==
According to The Nation, the "eight performances [were] chosen by Goodman himself from all that he recorded with various six-man combinations".

== Reception ==
Coin Machine Journal wrote upon the album's release: "It's full of the kind of hot music that really draws today's crowds".

== Track listing ==
Set of four 10-inch 78-rpm records (Columbia set C-102)

All the tracks are marked as "fox trot".

Side 1
No.	Title	Writer(s)	Artist(s)	Length
1.	"Rose Room (In Sunny Roseland)"	Williams–Hickman	Benny Goodman Sextet

Side 2
No.	Title	Writer(s)	Artist(s)	Length
1.	"Air Mail Special"	Benny Goodman	Benny Goodman and his Sextet

Side 3
No.	Title	Writer(s)	Artist(s)	Length
1.	"Flying Home"	De Lange–Goodman–Hampton	Benny Goodman Sextet

Side 4
No.	Title	Writer(s)	Artist(s)	Length
1.	"I Found a New Baby"	S. Williams–Palmer	Benny Goodman and his Sextet

Side 5
No.	Title	Writer(s)	Artist(s)	Length
1.	"Poor Butterfly"	Golden Hubbell	Benny Goodman Sextet

Side 6
No.	Title	Writer(s)	Artist(s)	Length
1.	"Grand Slam"	Goodman	Benny Goodman Sextet

Side 7
No.	Title	Writer(s)	Artist(s)	Length
1.	"The Wang Wang Blues"	Busse–Johnson–Mueller	Benny Goodman Sextet

Side 8
No.	Title	Writer(s)	Artist(s)	Length
1.	"As Long As I Live"	Koehler–Arlen	Benny Goodman and his Sextet
