= Watermelon Weather =

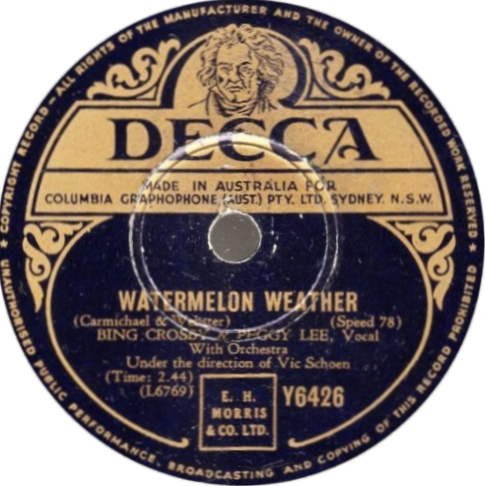
- 1953 78 RPM Australian record

Single by Bing Crosby and Peggy Lee
- A-side: "Watermelon Weather" "The Moon Came Up with a Great Idea Last Night"
- Released: 1952
- Label: Decca
- Songwriters: Hoagy Carmichael; Paul Francis Webster

"Watermelon Weather" is a song written by Hoagy Carmichael and Paul Francis Webster that was a hit for Bing Crosby and Peggy Lee in 1952.

Another version was recorded by Perry Como and Eddie Fisher with Mitchell Ayres and his orchestra. Their version made it to the 28 position on the Billboard pop chart.

== Critical reception ==
Professional ratings
Review scores
Source	Rating
Billboard	81/100

Billboard favorably reviewed Bing Crosby and Peggy Lee's recording (Decca 28238, coupled with "The Moon Came Up with a Great Idea Last Night") in its issue from June 14, 1952, rating it 81 on a scale of 100.

== Track listing ==
78 rpm (Decca 28238)

(L 6769)
No.	Title	Writer(s)	Note(s)	Length
1.	"Watermelon Weather"	Hoagy Carmichael; Paul Francis Webster	Bing Crosby and Peggy Lee; Vocal with orchestra directed by Vic Schoen	2:44

(L 6787)
No.	Title	Writer(s)	Note(s)	Length
1.	"The Moon Came Up with a Great Idea Last Night"	Jimmy Van Heusen; Johnny Burke	Bing Crosby and Peggy Lee; Vocal with orchestra directed by Vic Schoen	2:49
