= Original Benny Goodman Trio and Quartet Sessions, Vol. 1: After You've Gone =

Compilation album by Benny Goodman
- Released: 1987
- Recorded: July 11, 1935 – February 3, 1937
- Genre: Jazz
- Length: 68:19
- Label: Bluebird

Professional ratings
Review scores
Source	Rating
AllMusic	4/5 stars

Original Benny Goodman Trio and Quartet Sessions, Vol. 1: After You've Gone is a jazz compilation album by Benny Goodman. Released in 1987, it consists of selections recorded and originally released by Victor during 1935 and 1936. The personnel included Goodman on clarinet, Teddy Wilson on piano, and Gene Krupa on drums. When the trio became a quartet in August 1936, the fourth member was Lionel Hampton on vibraphone. Helen Ward is featured as vocalist on two recordings: "All My Life" and "Too Good to Be True".
