= Benny Goodman in Moscow =

Live album by Benny Goodman
- Released: 1962
- Recorded: 1962
- Genre: Jazz
- Label: RCA Victor

Professional ratings
Review scores
| Source | Rating |
|---|---|
| Down Beat | 3.5/5 stars |
| AllMusic | 4/5 stars |

Benny Goodman in Moscow is a jazz album by clarinetist Benny Goodman, recorded live in Moscow during his tour of the Soviet Union. It was released in December 1962 by RCA Victor and topped out at No. 80 on the Billboard Top LPs chart. It was re-released in 2007 on Giants of Jazz Recordings.
