= Harry Goodman (musician) =

20th century American jazz bassist

- Born: June 21, 1906; Chicago, Illinois, US
- Died: October 22, 1997 (aged 91) Gstaad, Switzerland
- Genres: Jazz, Swing, Big Band
- Occupation: Musician
- Instruments: Double Bass, Tuba
- Years active: 1926-1939
- Formerly of: Benny Goodman Orchestra

Harry Goodman (born June 21, 1906, in Chicago, Illinois, US; died October 22, 1997, in Gstaad, Switzerland) was an American jazz musician (double bass and tuba) who later became a music publisher. He was an active professional musician from the mid-1920s through 1939, participating in 208 recording sessions.

His first recording (“’Deed I Do”) was made in late 1926 with Ben Pollack and His Californians, which also included Glenn Miller, his brother Benny Goodman, Gil Rodin, Fud Livingston, and vocalist Frank Sylvano. In the following years, he played on recordings with the studio bands of Benny Goodman, Jimmy McHugh, Jack Pettis, and producer Irving Mills. In the 1930s, he also participated in recordings by Hoagy Carmichael (“Rockin’ Chair”), Jack Teagarden, Red Nichols, Gil Rodin, The Charleston Chasers, Wingy Manone, Harry Rosenthal, Red McKenzie’s Mound City Blue Blowers, Teddy Wilson, and Lionel Hampton, among others. He was a member of the Benny Goodman Orchestra from 1934 to 1939, including the 1938 concert that was the first jazz performance at Carnegie Hall. He also appeared in the television series American Masters.

After he left his brother’s band in the spring of 1939, he never performed as a bassist again. He ran various businesses, including a restaurant in Manhattan. He and his younger brother Gene (Eugene) Goodman founded a music publishing company, Regent Music. They later started Jewel Music and, in 1953, ARC Music, with Leonard and Phil Chess.

Goodman spent much of later years in France and died in Switzerland at age 91.

Although Harry Goodman played with many of the great swing music ensembles, he was not considered one of the great bassists. John Goldsby called him “a good journeyman player with the right family name.” Gunther Schuller wrote "Harry Goodman was at best competent but, more often than not, weak."
