= Air Play =

Compilation album by Benny Goodman
- Released: 1985
- Genre: Jazz

Professional ratings
Review scores
Source	Rating
AllMusic	4.5/5 stars

Air Play is a jazz compilation album by Benny Goodman consisting of performances from radio broadcasts dating between December 1936 and 1938. It was released in 1985.

== Track listing ==
1. "I Want to Be Happy" – 2:29
2. "Swing Low, Sweet Chariot" – 2:20
3. "Medly: Body & Soul, Dinah" – 5:55
4. "Stompin' at the Savoy" – 3:17
5. "Shine" – 2:42
6. "Japanese Sandman" – 2:59
7. "Body and Soul" – 2:49
8. "Dinah" – 2:47
9. "An Apple a Day" – 2:14
10. "Some of These Days" – 2:25
11. "Goodbye" – 1:57
12. "Chicago" – 2:30
13. "Moten Swing" – 2:49
14. "You're Blase'" – 2:19
15. "I've Got a Pocket Full of Dreams" – 2:16
16. "Stardust" – 2:41
17. "Russian Lullaby" – 2:17
18. "In a Mist" – 3:01
19. "Margie" – 2:13
20. "You Go to My Head" – 2:46
21. "You're Driving Me Crazy" – 1:48
22. "Lullaby in Rhythm" – 3:32
23. "Bumble Stomp" – 3:02
