= It's All Over Now (Peggy Lee song) =

Single by Peggy Lee with Dave Barbour and his orchestra
- A-side: "It's All Over Now" "Aren't You Kind of Glad We Did?"
- Released: 1946
- Genre: Jazz, pop
- Label: Capitol
- Songwriters: Marcotte; Skylar

"It's All Over Now" is a song written by Don Marcotte and Sunny Skylar that was a hit for Peggy Lee with Dave Barbour and his orchestra in 1946.

== Critical reception ==
Professional ratings
Review scores
Source	Rating
Billboard	favorable

Billboard favorably reviewed Peggy Lee's recording (Capitol 292, coupled with "Aren't You Kind of Glad We Did?") in its issue from November 23, 1946.

== Track listing ==
78 rpm (Capitol 292)

1211
No.	Title	Writer(s)	Note(s)	Length
1.	"It's All Over Now"	Marcotte; Skylar	Peggy Lee with Dave Barbour and his orchestra Guitar solo — Dave Barbour

1212
No.	Title	Writer(s)	Note(s)	Length
1.	"Aren't You Kind of Glad We Did?"	Gershwin; Gershwin	From the Twentieth Century-Fox picture The Shocking Miss Pilgrim; Peggy Lee with Dave Barbour and his orchestra

== Charts ==
Chart (1946)	Peak position
US Billboard Records Most-Played on the Air	10
