= Phil Boutelje =

American pianist, songwriter, composer, author and conductor

Phil Boutelje (August 6, 1895, in Philadelphia – July 29, 1979, in Woodland Hills, Los Angeles) was an American pianist, songwriter, composer, author and conductor.

== Biography ==
Boutelje received specialized music training at the Philadelphia Music Academy. He was a military bandmaster during World War I. Returning to civilian life, he played piano for several jazz groups, including Nick Lucas in 1922 and Paul Whiteman. He later arranged music for the Whiteman orchestra. By the early 1930s he had been lured to Hollywood, becoming music director for Paramount Pictures and United Artists.

== Musical contributions ==
Boutelje composed considerable music for film soundtracks, not always receiving credit for his contributions. However, during his career he received two Academy Award nominations for his film contributions (in 1939 for The Great Victor Herbert, with Arthur Lange, and in 1943 for Hi Diddle Diddle).

Boutelje became a member of ASCAP in 1930. His chief musical collaborators included Ned Washington, Dick Winfree, Harry Tobias, Rubey Cowan, Foster Carling and Al Dubin. His song compositions include "China Boy", "Blue Dawn", "Star of Hope", "Little Doll", "The Man With the Big Sombrero", "Teton Mountain Stomp", "I Loved You Too Little", "I Love You, Believe Me I Love You", "Hippy Happy Henny", "Monna Vanna", and "Lonesome".

== Later life ==
In 1975 Boutelje married actress Babe London, whom he met after both retired to the Motion Picture Country Home at Woodland Hills, California. The Bouteljes lived their final years at the home, and he died there in 1979.
