= Where Can I Go Without You =

Single by Peggy Lee with Gordon Jenkins and his orchestra
- A-side: "Where Can I Go Without You" "Go You Where You Go"
- Released: 1954
- Label: Decca
- Songwriters: Victor Young; Peggy Lee

"Where Can I Go Without You" is a song written by Victor Young and Peggy Lee that was a hit for Peggy Lee with Victor Young and His Singing Strings in 1954.

== Critical reception ==
Professional ratings
Review scores
Source	Rating
Billboard	76/100

Billboard reviewed Peggy Lee's recording (Decca 29003, coupled with "Go You Where You Go") in its issue from January 23, 1954, rating it 76 on a scale of 100.

== Track listing ==
45 rpm (Decca 9-29003)

(45-L 7053)
No.	Title	Writer(s)	Note(s)	Length
1.	"Where Can I Go Without You"	Victor Young; Peggy Lee	Peggy Lee with Victor Young and Victor Young and His Singing Strings; Vocal with orchestra	3:12

(45-L 6850)
No.	Title	Writer(s)	Note(s)	Length
1.	"Go You Where You Go"	Al Frisch; Ralph Care	Peggy Lee with Gordon Jenkins and his orchestra Vocal with orchestra	3:17
