= For Every Man There's a Woman =

Single by Benny Goodman and his orchestra with Peggy Lee
- A-side: "For Every Man There's a Woman" "Beyond the Sea"
- Released: 1948
- Genre: Jazz, pop
- Label: Capitol
- Songwriters: Harold Arlen; Leo Robin

Audio
- "For Every Man There's a Woman" on YouTube

"For Every Man There's a Woman" is a song written by Harold Arlen and Leo Robin that was a hit for Benny Goodman and his orchestra with Peggy Lee in 1948.

== Critical reception ==
Professional ratings
Review scores
Source	Rating
Billboard	89/100

Billboard favorably reviewed Peggy Lee's recording (Capitol 15030, coupled with "Beyond the Sea") in its issue from January 31, 1948, rating it 89 on a scale of 100.

== Track listing ==
78 rpm (Capitol 15030)

(2723) Y
No.	Title	Writer(s)	Note(s)	Length
1.	"For Every Man There's a Woman"	Harold Arlen; Leo Robin	From the Universal-International picture Casbah; Benny Goodman and his orchestra with Peggy Lee; Vocal with orchestra

(3147) Z
No.	Title	Writer(s)	Note(s)	Length
1.	"Beyond the Sea" ("La Mer")	Charles Trenet; Jack Lawrence	Benny Goodman and his orchestra Instrumental
