= Winter Weather (song) =

Single by Benny Goodman and his orchestra
- A-side: "Winter Weather" "Ev'rything I Love"
- Released: 1941
- Genre: Jazz
- Label: Okeh
- Songwriter: Ted Shapiro

Audio
- "Winter Weather" on YouTube

"Winter Weather" is a song written by Ted Shapiro that was a hit for Benny Goodman and his orchestra, with a vocal chorus by Peggy Lee and Art London, in 1942.

== Critical reception ==
Benny Goodman and his orchestra version
Review scores
Source	Rating
Billboard	favorable

Billboard favorably reviewed Benny Goodman's recording (Okeh 6516, coupled with "Ev'rything I Love") in its issue from 3 January 1942.

== Track listing ==
78 rpm (Okeh 6516)

31811
No.	Title	Writer(s)	Note(s)	Length
1.	"Winter Weather"	Shapiro	Fox trot Vocal chorus by Peggy Lee and Art London

31812
No.	Title	Writer(s)	Note(s)	Length
1.	"Ev'rything I Love"	Cole Porter	Fox trot From Let's Face It; Vocal chorus by Peggy Lee

== Charts ==
Chart (1942)	Peak position
US Billboard	24
