= Noche de luna =

"Full Moon"

Single by Benny Goodman and his orchestra
- A-side: "I Threw a Kiss in the Ocean" "Full Moon"
- Released: 1942
- Genre: Jazz
- Label: Columbia
- Songwriters: Russell; Curiel; Odette

Audio
- "Full Moon" on YouTube

"Noche de luna" is a song written by Gonzalo Curiel. Adapted into English as "Full Moon" by Bob Russell and Marcelene Odette, it was a hit for Benny Goodman and his orchestra, with a vocal chorus by Peggy Lee, in 1942.

== Critical reception ==
Professional ratings
Review scores
Source	Rating
Billboard	favorable

Billboard positively reviewed the song in its issue from May 23, 1942.

== Track listing ==
78 rpm (Columbia 36590)

32601
No.	Title	Writer(s)	Note(s)	Length
1.	"I Threw a Kiss in the Ocean"	Berlin	Fox trot Vocal chorus by Peggy Lee

32603
No.	Title	Writer(s)	Note(s)	Length
1.	"Full Moon" (Noche de luna)	Russell; Curiel; Odette	Fox trot Vocal chorus by Peggy Lee
