= China Boy =

1922 song by Phil Boutelje and Dick Winfree

Song
- Written: Phil Boutelje; Dick Winfree
- Genre: Jazz

"China Boy" is a 1922 popular song written by Phil Boutelje and Dick Winfree.

== Background ==
The song was introduced in vaudeville by Henry E. Murtagh, and popularized by Paul Whiteman's 1929 Columbia recording featuring Bix Beiderbecke. It has become a jazz standard and has been recorded by artists including Louis Armstrong, Mildred Bailey, Sidney Bechet, Gene Kardos, Benny Goodman, Lionel Hampton, Isham Jones, Red Nichols, Charlie Parker, Oscar Peterson, Django Reinhardt and Fats Waller.

== Movie appearances ==
The song has appeared in numerous films, both credited and uncredited, from 1929 to 1998, including Hold That Kiss (1938), Strike Up the Band (1940), The Benny Goodman Story (1956), The Last Emperor (1987), The Impostors (1998), "Mirrors" (1934), and "Red Nichols and his Five Pennies" (1929).

== See also ==
- Steely Dan, "Rikki Don't Lose that Number" (opening track of 'Pretzel Logic')
- List of 1920s jazz standards
