= Pass Me By (song from Father Goose) =

Single by Peggy Lee

from the album Pass Me By
- A-side: "Pass Me By" "That's What It Takes"
- Released: 1965
- Label: Capitol
- Songwriters: Cy Coleman; Carolyn Leigh

"Pass Me By" is a song from the motion picture Father Goose, written by Cy Coleman and Carolyn Leigh, that was a hit for Peggy Lee in 1965.

== Track listing ==
45 rpm (Capitol 5346)

45-53142
No.	Title	Writer(s)	Note(s)	Length
1.	"Pass Me By"	Cy Coleman; Carolyn Leigh	Main theme from the motion picture Father Goose; Peggy Lee; Musical direction Lou Levy; Produced by Dave Cavanaugh	2:23

45-53143
No.	Title	Writer(s)	Note(s)	Length
1.	"That's What It Takes"	Coleman; Lee; Schluger	Peggy Lee; Musical direction Lou Levy; Produced by Dave Cavanaugh	2:17

== Charts ==
Chart (1965)	Peak position
US Billboard Hot 100	93
