= Light of Love (Peggy Lee song) =

Single by Peggy Lee with Jack Marshall's Music
- A-side: "Light of Love" "Sweetheart"
- Released: 1958
- Genre: Jazz, pop
- Label: Capitol
- Songwriter: Charles Singleton

"Light of Love" is a song written by Charles Singleton that was a hit for Peggy Lee in 1958.

== Critical reception ==
Peggy Lee version
Review scores
| Source | Rating |
|---|---|
| Billboard | favorable (Spotlight winner) |

Martha Carson version
Review scores
| Source | Rating |
|---|---|
| Billboard | 2/4 stars |

Billboard favorably reviewed Peggy Lee's recording (Capitol 4071, coupled with "Sweetheart") in its issue from October 13, 1958.

== Track listing ==
45 rpm (Capitol F4071)

45-30107
| No. | Title | Writer(s) | Note(s) | Length |
|---|---|---|---|---|
| 1. | "Light of Love" | Charles Singleton | Peggy Lee with Jack Marshall's Music; With the Ev. Freeman Singers | 1:30 |

45-30107
| No. | Title | Writer(s) | Note(s) | Length |
|---|---|---|---|---|
| 1. | "Sweetheart" | Winfield Scott | Peggy Lee with Jack Marshall's Music; Vocal with instrumental accompaniment | 2:22 |

== Charts ==
| Chart (1958) | Peak position |
|---|---|
| US Billboard Hot 100 | 63 |
