= Dave Barbour =

American jazz guitarist (1912–1965)

- Born: David Michael Barbour; May 28, 1912; Long Island, New York, U.S.
- Died: December 11, 1965 (aged 53) Malibu, California, U.S.
- Genres: Jazz
- Occupation: Musician
- Instruments: Guitar, banjo
- Years active: 1930–1962

David Michael Barbour (May 28, 1912 – December 11, 1965) was an American jazz guitarist. He was married to singer Peggy Lee and was her co-writer, accompanist, and bandleader.

== Biography ==
Barbour was born on Long Island, New York, United States. When Barbour was twelve, he played banjo at Carnegie Hall. He started his career as a banjoist with Adrian Rollini in 1933 and then Wingy Manone in 1934. He switched to guitar in the middle of the decade and played with Red Norvo from 1935 to 1936. He found much work as a studio musician and in ensembles with Teddy Wilson and Billie Holiday (1937), Artie Shaw (1939), Lennie Hayton, Charlie Barnet (1945), Raymond Scott, Glenn Miller, Lou Holden, and Woody Herman (1949). He also recorded with André Previn in 1945.

While a member of Benny Goodman's orchestra in 1942, Barbour fell in love with lead singer Peggy Lee. They got married and moved to Los Angeles, but they divorced in 1951. Lee married three more times. He then married Marian Collier from 1960 to 1963. Barbour left music and acted in the movies Mr. Music and The Secret Fury in 1950. He performed sporadically, recording once with Benny Carter in 1962.

Barbour died in 1965 of a hemorrhaged ulcer in Malibu Beach, California, at the age of 53.

== Discography ==
- Mildred Bailey, Her Greatest Performances 1929–1946 (Columbia, 1962)
- Benny Carter, BBB & Co. (Prestige Swingville, 1962)
- Benny Goodman, Volume 3: All the Cats Joined In (CBS, 1988)
- Billie Holiday, The Quintessential Billie Holiday Volume 1 1933–1935 (CBS, 1987)
- Lena Horne, The Young Star (2002)
- Peggy Lee, Peggy Lee With The Dave Barbour Band (LaserLight, 1991)
- Red McKenzie, Red McKenzie 1935–1937 (Timeless, 1994)
- Robert Mitchum, Tall Dark Stranger (Bear Family 1997)
- Mound City Blue Blowers, 1935–1936 (Timeless, 1994)
- Red Norvo, Jivin' the Jeep (Hep, 1993)
- Andre Previn, Andre Previn at Sunset (Black Lion, 1993)
- Boyd Raeburn, Boyd Meets Stravinsky (Savoy 1955)
- Artie Shaw, 1946–1950 (Classics, 2004)
- Frank Sinatra, Christmas Dreaming (CBS, 1987)
- Jeri Southern, Warm Intimate Songs In The Jeri Southern Style (Decca, 1954)
- Teddy Wilson, Teddy Wilson with Billie Holiday (ASV/Living Era 1988)
- Lester Young, The Complete Aladddin Recordings of Lester Young (Blue Note, 1995)
