= Benny Goodman =

American jazz clarinetist and bandleader (1909–1986)

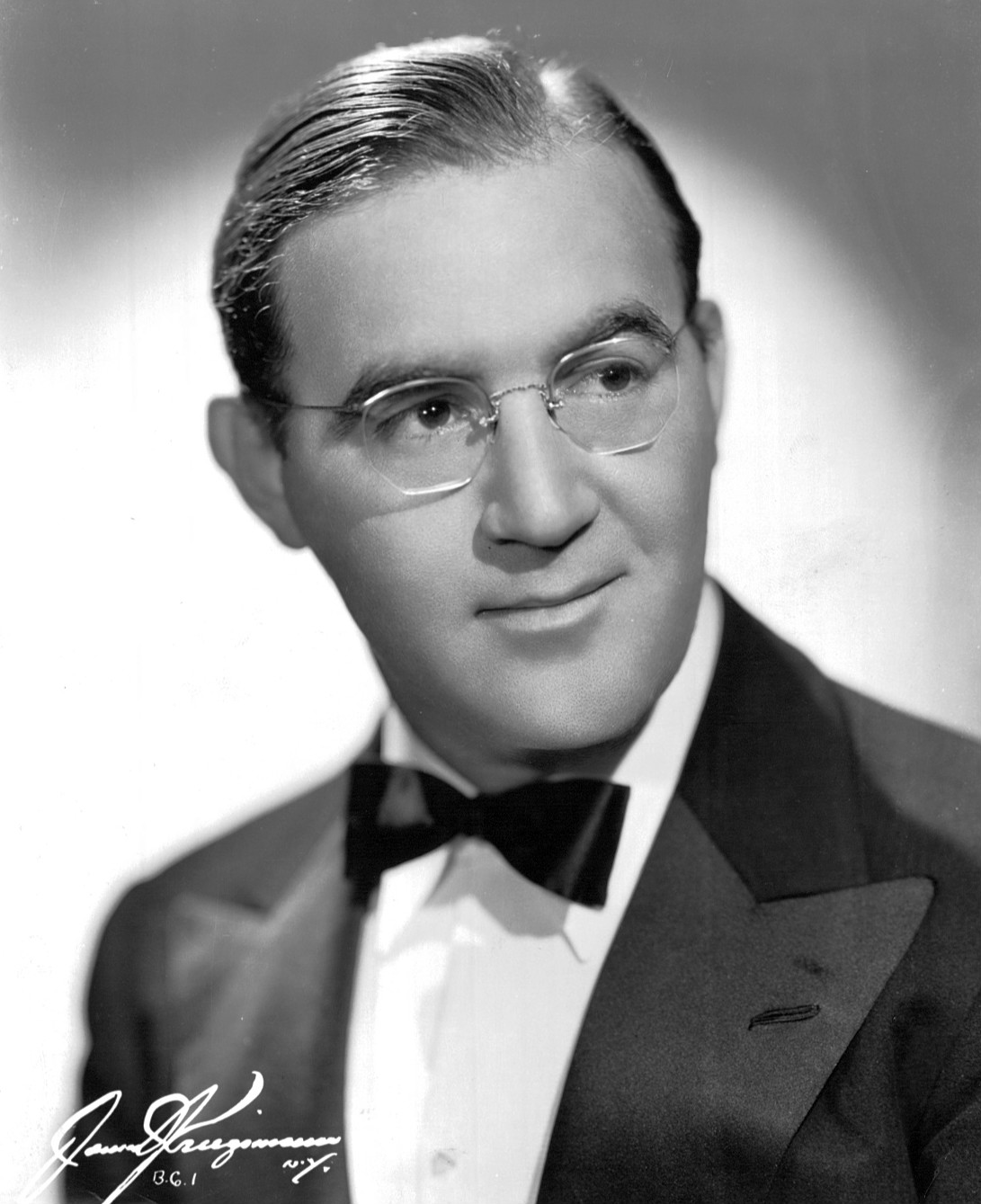
- Goodman in 1942

Background information
- Born: May 30, 1909; Chicago, Illinois, U.S.
- Died: June 13, 1986 (aged 77) New York City, U.S.
- Genres: Jazz; swing; big band; classical
- Occupations: Musician; bandleader
- Instrument: Clarinet
- Years active: 1926–1986
- Labels: Columbia; RCA Victor; V-Disc
- Website: bennygoodman.com

Benjamin David Goodman (May 30, 1909 – June 13, 1986) was an American jazz clarinetist and bandleader, known as the "King of Swing".

From 1935 until the mid-1940s, Goodman led one of the most popular swing big bands in the United States. His concert at Carnegie Hall in New York City on January 16, 1938, is described by critic Bruce Eder as "the single most important jazz or popular music concert in history: jazz's 'coming out' party to the world of 'respectable' music."

Goodman's bands started the careers of many jazz musicians. During an era of racial segregation, he led one of the first integrated jazz groups, his trio and quartet. He continued performing until the end of his life while pursuing an interest in classical music.

== Early years ==
Goodman was the ninth of twelve children born to poor Jewish emigrants from the Russian Empire. His father, David Goodman, came to the United States in 1892 from Warsaw in partitioned Poland and became a tailor. His mother, Dora Grisinsky, came from Kaunas. They met in Baltimore, Maryland and moved to Chicago before Goodman's birth. With little income and a large family, they moved to the Maxwell Street neighborhood, an overcrowded slum near railroad yards and factories that was populated by German, Irish, Italian, Polish, Scandinavian, and Jewish immigrants.

Goodman grew up in poverty, where money was a constant problem for his family. On Sundays, his father took the children to free band concerts in Douglas Park; this was the first time Goodman experienced live professional performances. Hoping that music would offer his sons an escape from poverty and help keep them out of trouble, David Goodman enrolled ten-year-old Benny and two of his brothers in free music classes at the Kehelah Jacob Synagogue, starting in 1919. His older brothers were given a tuba and a trumpet, while Benny, the youngest, received a clarinet. Additionally, Benny took two years of clarinet lessons from Franz Schoepp, a classically trained clarinetist and member of the Chicago Symphony Orchestra. The following year, Goodman joined the boys' club band at Hull House, where he received instruction from the band director, James Sylvester. By joining the band, he had the chance to spend two weeks at a summer camp near Chicago, which was his only opportunity to escape his tough neighborhood. At the age of 13, he obtained his first union card and performed on excursion boats on Lake Michigan. In 1923, he played at Guyon's Paradise, a local dance hall.

In the summer of 1923, he met the cornetist and composer Bix Beiderbecke. He attended the Lewis Institute (now the Illinois Institute of Technology) in 1924 as a high school sophomore and played clarinet in a dance hall band. When he was 17, his father was killed by a passing car after stepping off a streetcar, which Goodman called "the saddest thing that ever happened in our family".

== Career ==
=== Early career ===
His early influences were New Orleans jazz clarinetists who worked in Chicago, such as Jimmie Noone, Johnny Dodds, and Leon Roppolo. He learned quickly, becoming a strong player at an early age, and was soon playing in bands. He made his professional debut in 1921 at the Central Park Theater on the West Side of Chicago. He entered Harrison Technical High School in Chicago in 1922. At fourteen he became a member of the musicians' union and worked in a band featuring Bix Beiderbecke. Two years later, in 1926, he joined the Ben Pollack Orchestra and made his first recordings.

=== From sideman to bandleader ===
Goodman moved to New York City and became a session musician for radio, Broadway musicals, and in studios. In addition to clarinet, he sometimes played alto saxophone and baritone saxophone. His first recording pressed to disc (Victor 20394) occurred on December 9, 1926, in Chicago. The session resulted in the song "When I First Met Mary", which also included Glenn Miller, Harry Goodman, and Ben Pollack. In a Victor recording session on March 21, 1928, he played alongside Miller, Tommy Dorsey, and Joe Venuti in the All-Star Orchestra directed by Nathaniel Shilkret. He played with the bands of Red Nichols, Ben Selvin, Ted Lewis, and Isham Jones and recorded for Brunswick under the name Benny Goodman's Boys, a band that featured Glenn Miller. In 1928, Goodman and Miller wrote "Room 1411", Miller's first known composition, which was released as a Brunswick 78.

He reached the charts for the first time in January 1931 with "He's Not Worth Your Tears", featuring a vocal by Scrappy Lambert for Melotone. After signing with Columbia in 1934, he had top ten hits with "Ain't Cha Glad?" and "I Ain't Lazy, I'm Just Dreamin'" sung by Jack Teagarden, "Ol' Pappy" sung by Mildred Bailey, and "Riffin' the Scotch" sung by Billie Holiday. An invitation to play at the Billy Rose Music Hall led to his creation of an orchestra for the four-month engagement. The orchestra recorded "Moonglow", which became a number one hit and was followed by the Top Ten hits "Take My Word" and "Bugle Call Rag".

NBC hired Goodman for the radio program Let's Dance. John Hammond asked Fletcher Henderson if he wanted to write arrangements for Goodman, and Henderson agreed. During the Depression, Henderson disbanded his orchestra because he was in debt. Goodman hired Henderson's band members to teach his musicians how to play the music.

Goodman's band was one of three to perform on Let's Dance, playing arrangements by Henderson along with hits such as "Get Happy" and "Limehouse Blues" by Spud Murphy.

Goodman's portion of the program was broadcast too late at night to attract a large audience on the east coast. He and his band remained on Let's Dance until May of that year when a strike by employees of the series' sponsor, Nabisco, forced the cancellation of the radio show. An engagement was booked at Manhattan's Roosevelt Grill filling in for Guy Lombardo, but the audience expected "sweet" music and Goodman's band was unsuccessful.

Goodman spent six months performing on Let's Dance, and during that time he recorded six more Top Ten hits for Columbia.

=== Catalyst for the swing era ===
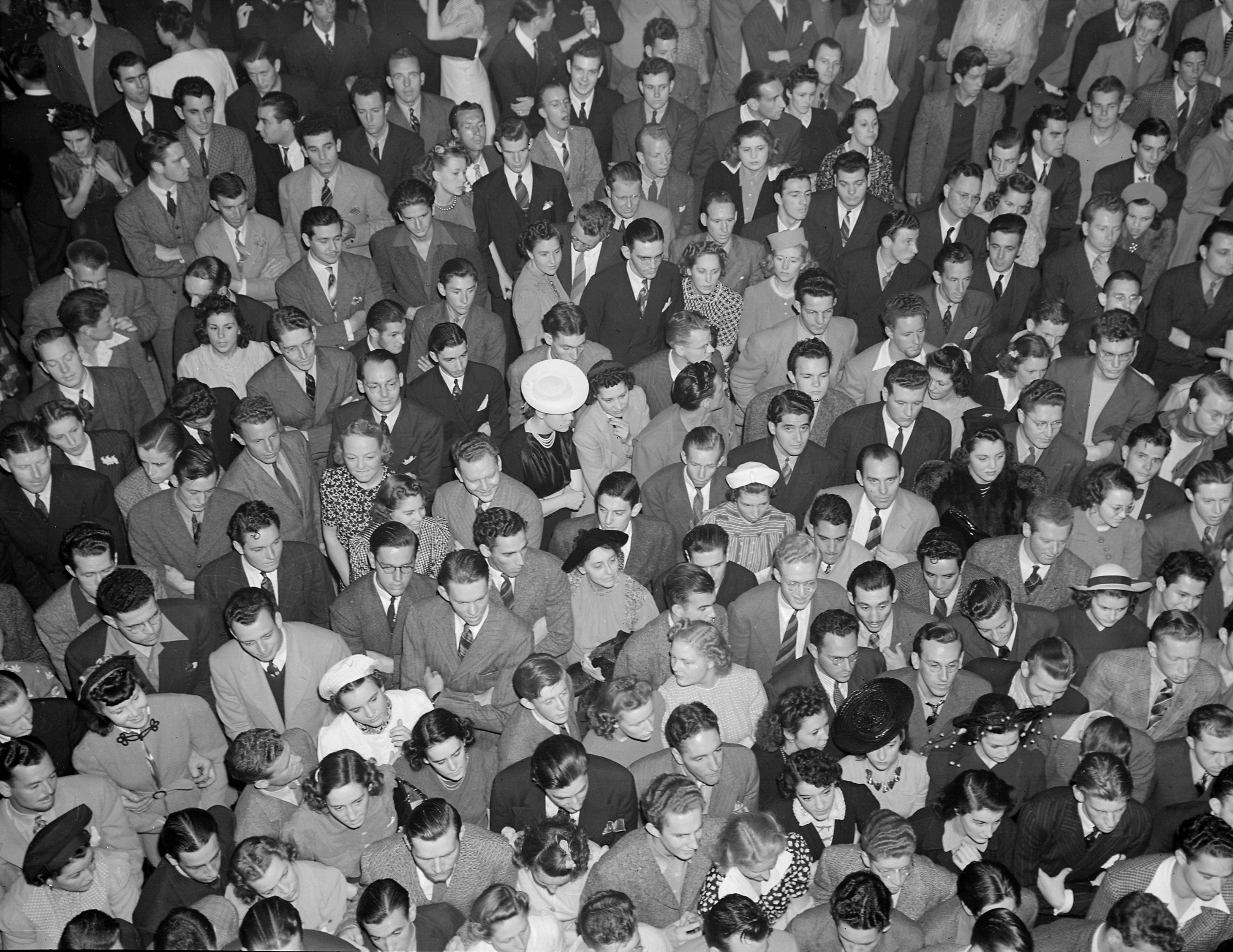
Goodman's swing fans in Oakland, California, in 1940

On July 31, 1935, "King Porter Stomp" was released with "Sometimes I'm Happy" on the B-side, both arranged by Henderson and recorded on July 1. In Pittsburgh at the Stanley Theater some members of the audience danced in the aisles. But these arrangements had little impact on the tour until August 19 at McFadden's Ballroom in Oakland, California. Goodman and his band, which included trumpeter Bunny Berigan, drummer Gene Krupa, and singer Helen Ward were met by a large crowd of young dancers who cheered the music they had heard on Let's Dance. Newspaper columnist Herb Caen wrote, "from the first note, the place was in an uproar." One night later, at Pismo Beach, the show was a flop, and the band thought the overwhelming reception in Oakland had been a fluke. (Note: Collier, in his book Benny Goodman and the Swing Era (page 164), listed both a "McFadden's Ballroom in San Francisco" and "Sweet's in Oakland" as separate engagements for Goodman, with Pismo Beach in between. However, there was never a McFadden's or a Sweet's Ballroom in San Francisco, and the trip from there to Pismo Beach was inconveniently long. Oakland and San Francisco are about 15 miles (24 km) apart, but Pismo Beach is more than 235 miles (378 km) south of both of them. Pismo Beach is only 175 miles (282 km) from Los Angeles and would have been a more convenient place for Goodman to have played while traveling from Oakland to L.A.)

The next night, August 21, 1935, at the Palomar Ballroom in Los Angeles, Goodman and his band began a three-week engagement. On top of the Let's Dance airplay, Al Jarvis had been playing Goodman's records on KFWB radio. Goodman started the evening with stock arrangements, but after an indifferent response, he began the second set with arrangements by Fletcher Henderson and Spud Murphy. According to Willard Alexander, the band's booking agent, Krupa said, "If we're gonna die, Benny, let's die playing our own thing." The crowd broke into cheers and applause. News reports spread word of the exciting music and enthusiastic dancing. The Palomar engagement was such a marked success that it is often described as the beginning of the swing era. According to Donald Clarke, "It is clear in retrospect that the Swing Era had been waiting to happen, but it was Goodman and his band that touched it off."

The reception of American swing was less enthusiastic in Europe. British author J. C. Squire filed a complaint with BBC Radio to demand it stop playing Goodman's music, which he called "an awful series of jungle noises which can hearten no man." Germany's Nazi party barred jazz from the radio, claiming it was part of a Jewish conspiracy to destroy the culture. Italy's fascist government banned the broadcast of any music composed or played by Jews which they said threatened "the flower of our race, the youth."

In November 1935, Goodman accepted an invitation to play in Chicago at the Joseph Urban Room at the Congress Hotel. His stay there was extended to six months, and his popularity was cemented by nationwide radio broadcasts over NBC affiliate stations. While in Chicago, the band recorded "If I Could Be with You (One Hour Tonight)", "Stompin' at the Savoy", and "Goody Goody". Goodman also played three concerts produced by Chicago socialite and jazz aficionado Helen Oakley. These "Rhythm Club" concerts at the Congress Hotel included sets in which Goodman and Krupa sat in with Fletcher Henderson's band, perhaps the first racially integrated big band appearing before a paying audience in the United States. Goodman and Krupa played in a trio with Teddy Wilson on piano. Both combinations were well received, and Wilson remained.

In his 1935–1936 radio broadcasts from Chicago, Goodman was introduced as the "Rajah of Rhythm". Slingerland Drum Company had been calling Krupa the "King of Swing" as part of a sales campaign, but shortly after Goodman and his crew left Chicago in May 1936 to spend the summer filming The Big Broadcast of 1937 in Hollywood, the title "King of Swing" was applied to Goodman by the media.

At the end of June 1936, Goodman went to Hollywood, where, on June 30, 1936, his band began CBS's Camel Caravan, its third and (according to Connor and Hicks) its greatest sponsored radio show, co-starring Goodman and his former boss Nathaniel Shilkret. By spring 1936, Fletcher Henderson was writing arrangements for Goodman's band.

=== Carnegie Hall concert ===
In late 1937, Goodman's publicist Wynn Nathanson suggested that Goodman and his band play Carnegie Hall in New York City. The sold-out concert was held on the evening of January 16, 1938. It is regarded as one of the most significant concerts in jazz history. After years of work by musicians from all over the country, jazz had finally been accepted by mainstream audiences—according to Stan Ayeroff, "the concert helped jazz evolve from being strictly dance music to music worthy of a discerning listening audience. It was the start of jazz being recognized as an art form on a par with classical music."

Recordings of the concert were made, but even by the technology of the day the equipment used was not of the finest quality. These recordings were made on acetate, and aluminum studio masters were cut. The idea of recording the concert came from Albert Marx, a friend of Goodman's, for the purposes of a gift for his wife Helen Ward, as well as gifting a second set to Goodman. Sometime in or before 1950, Goodman recovered the acetates from his sister-in-law's closet, who had informed him about them, and took them to the audio engineer William Savory. The pair took them to Columbia, with Goodman realising the recordings could be used as leverage to make a recording contract with Columbia (having been eager to end his contract with Capitol). A selection was then released as an LP entitled The Famous 1938 Carnegie Hall Jazz Concert.

=== Charlie Christian ===
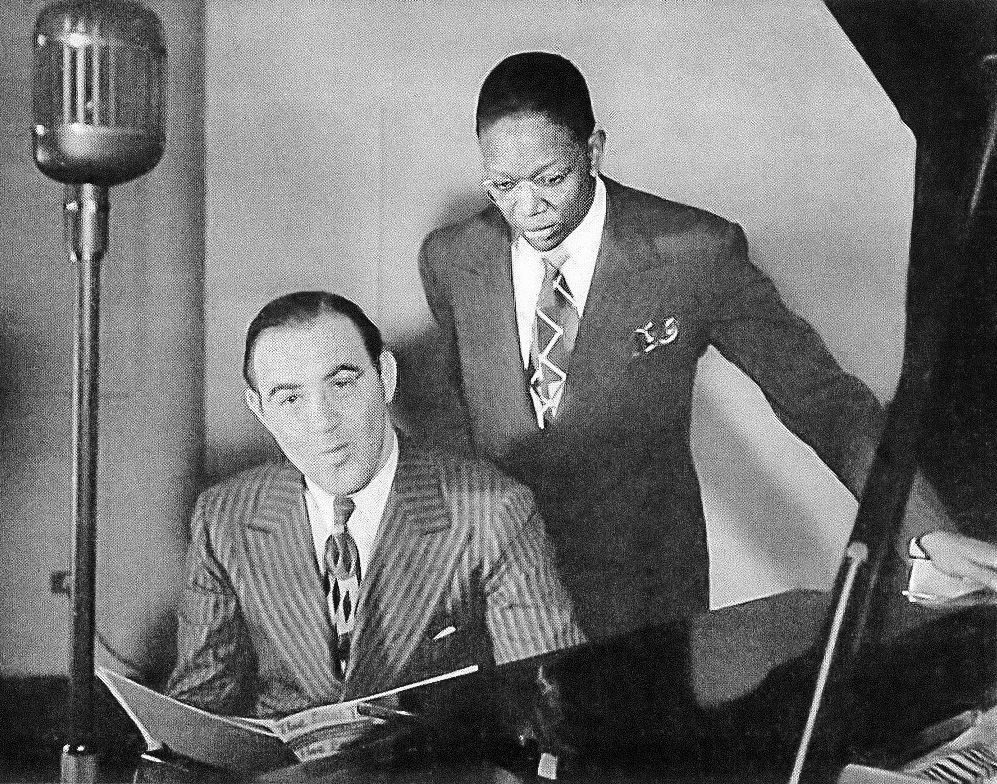
Goodman with Christian in a recording studio, April 1941

In 1939, pianist and arranger Mary Lou Williams suggested to John Hammond, who was responsible for finding new talent for Goodman, that he see guitarist Charlie Christian. Hammond had seen Christian perform in Oklahoma City on July 10, 1939, and recommended him to Goodman, but Goodman was uninterested in electric guitar and was put off by Christian's taste in gaudy clothing. Unbeknownst to Goodman, at an August 16 concert at the Victor Hugo Restaurant in Beverly Hills, Hammond inserted Christian onto the stage. Goodman started playing "Rose Room" on the assumption that Christian didn't know it, but his performance impressed the audience immensely. According to Hammond, "before long the crowd was screaming with amazement. 'Rose Room' continued for more than three quarters of an hour and Goodman received an ovation unlike any even he had before. No one present will ever forget it, least of all Benny."

Christian was a member of the Benny Goodman Sextet from 1939 to 1941, and during these two years he turned the electric guitar into a popular jazz instrument.

=== Decline of swing ===
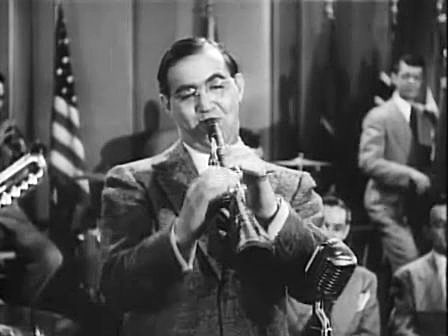
Goodman in Stage Door Canteen (1943)

Goodman continued his success throughout the late 1930s with his big band, his trio and quartet, and the sextet formed in August 1939, the same month Goodman returned to Columbia Records after four years with RCA Victor. At Columbia, John Hammond, his future brother-in-law, produced most of his sessions. By the mid-1940s, however, big bands had lost much of their popularity. In 1941, ASCAP had a licensing war with music publishers. From 1942 to 1944, and again in 1948, the musicians' union went on strike against the major record labels in the United States, and singers acquired the popularity that the big bands had once enjoyed. During the 1942–44 strike, the War Department approached the union and requested the production of V-Discs, a set of records containing new recordings for soldiers, thereby boosting the rise of new artists. Also, by the late 1940s, swing was no longer the dominant style of jazz musicians.

=== Exploring bebop ===
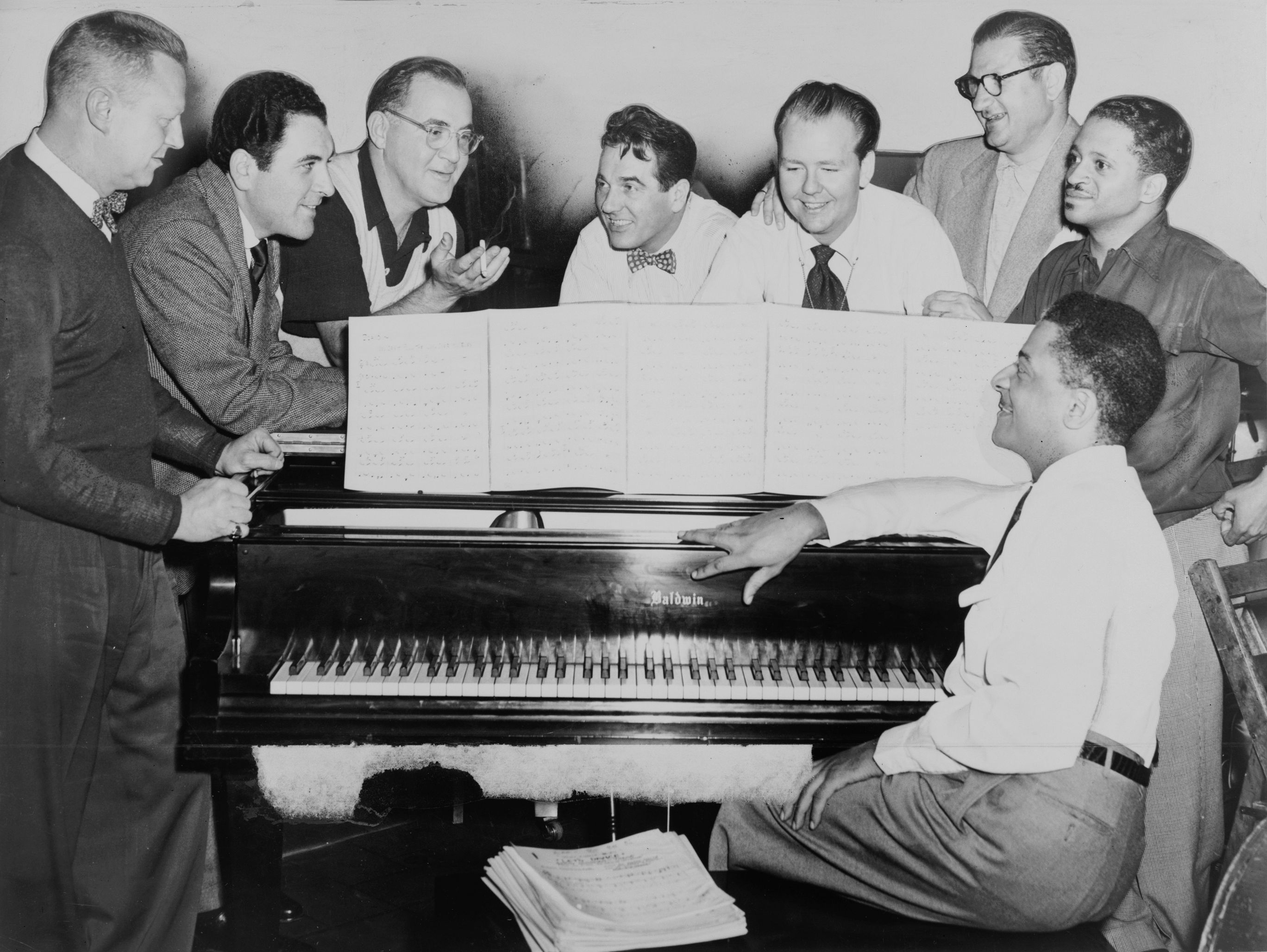
Goodman (third from left) with some of his former musicians, seated around piano left to right: Vernon Brown, George Auld, Gene Krupa, Clint Neagley, Ziggy Elman, Israel Crosby and Teddy Wilson (at piano); 1952

By the 1940s, some jazz musicians were borrowing from classical music, while others, such as Charlie Parker, were broadening the rhythmic, harmonic, and melodic vocabulary of swing to create bebop (or bop). The bebop recordings Goodman made for Capitol were praised by critics. For his bebop band he hired Buddy Greco, Zoot Sims, and Wardell Gray. He consulted his friend Mary Lou Williams for advice on how to approach the music of Dizzy Gillespie and Charlie Parker. Pianist Mel Powell was also an adviser in 1945. Goodman enjoyed bebop. When he heard Thelonious Monk, he said, "I like it, I like that very much. I like the piece and I like the way he played it ... I think he's got a sense of humor and he's got some good things there." He also admired Swedish clarinetist Stan Hasselgård. But after playing with a bebop band for over a year, he returned to his swing band because he concluded that was what he knew best. In 1953, he said, "Maybe bop has done more to set music back for years than anything ... Basically it's all wrong. It's not even knowing the scales ... Bop was mostly publicity and people figuring angles."

=== Classical repertoire ===
In 1949 he studied with clarinetist Reginald Kell, requiring a change in technique: "instead of holding the mouthpiece between his front teeth and lower lip, as he had done since he first took a clarinet in hand 30 years earlier, Goodman learned to adjust his embouchure to the use of both lips and even to use new fingering techniques. He had his old finger calluses removed and started to learn how to play his clarinet again—almost from scratch."

Goodman commissioned compositions for clarinet and chamber ensembles or orchestra that have become standard pieces of classical repertoire. He premiered works by composers, such as Contrasts by Béla Bartók; Clarinet Concerto No. 2, Op. 115 by Malcolm Arnold; Derivations for Clarinet and Band by Morton Gould; Sonata for Clarinet and Piano by Francis Poulenc, and Clarinet Concerto by Aaron Copland. Prelude, Fugue, and Riffs by Leonard Bernstein was commissioned for Woody Herman's big band, but it was premiered by Goodman. Herman was the dedicatee (1945) and first performer (1946) of Igor Stravinsky's Ebony Concerto; many years later, Stravinsky made another recording with Goodman as the soloist.

External audio
- Benny Goodman in Mozart's Clarinet Concerto, K. 622; Here on Archive.org
- Benny Goodman & the Columbia Symphony Orchestra in Aaron Copland's Clarinet Concerto; Here on Archive.org

He made a recording of Mozart's Clarinet Quintet in July 1956 with the Boston Symphony String Quartet at the Berkshire Festival; on the same occasion he recorded Mozart's Clarinet Concerto in A major, K. 622, with the Boston Symphony Orchestra conducted by Charles Munch. He also recorded the clarinet concertos of Weber. In 1972, he was a soloist with the Naumburg Orchestral Concerts, in the Naumburg Bandshell, Central Park, in the summer series.

After forays outside swing, Goodman started a new band in 1953. According to Donald Clarke, this was not a happy time for Goodman. He reunited the band to tour with Louis Armstrong. But he insulted Armstrong and "was appalled at the vaudeville aspects of Louis's act...a contradiction of everything Goodman stood for". Armstrong left Goodman hanging during a joint performance where Goodman called Armstrong back onstage to wrap up the show. Armstrong refused to perform alongside Goodman, which led essentially to the end of their friendship.

Goodman's band appeared as a specialty act in the films The Big Broadcast of 1937; Hollywood Hotel (1938); Syncopation (1942); The Powers Girl (1942); Stage Door Canteen (1943); The Gang's All Here (1943); Sweet and Low-Down (1944), Goodman's only starring feature; Make Mine Music (1946) and A Song Is Born (1948).

== Later years ==
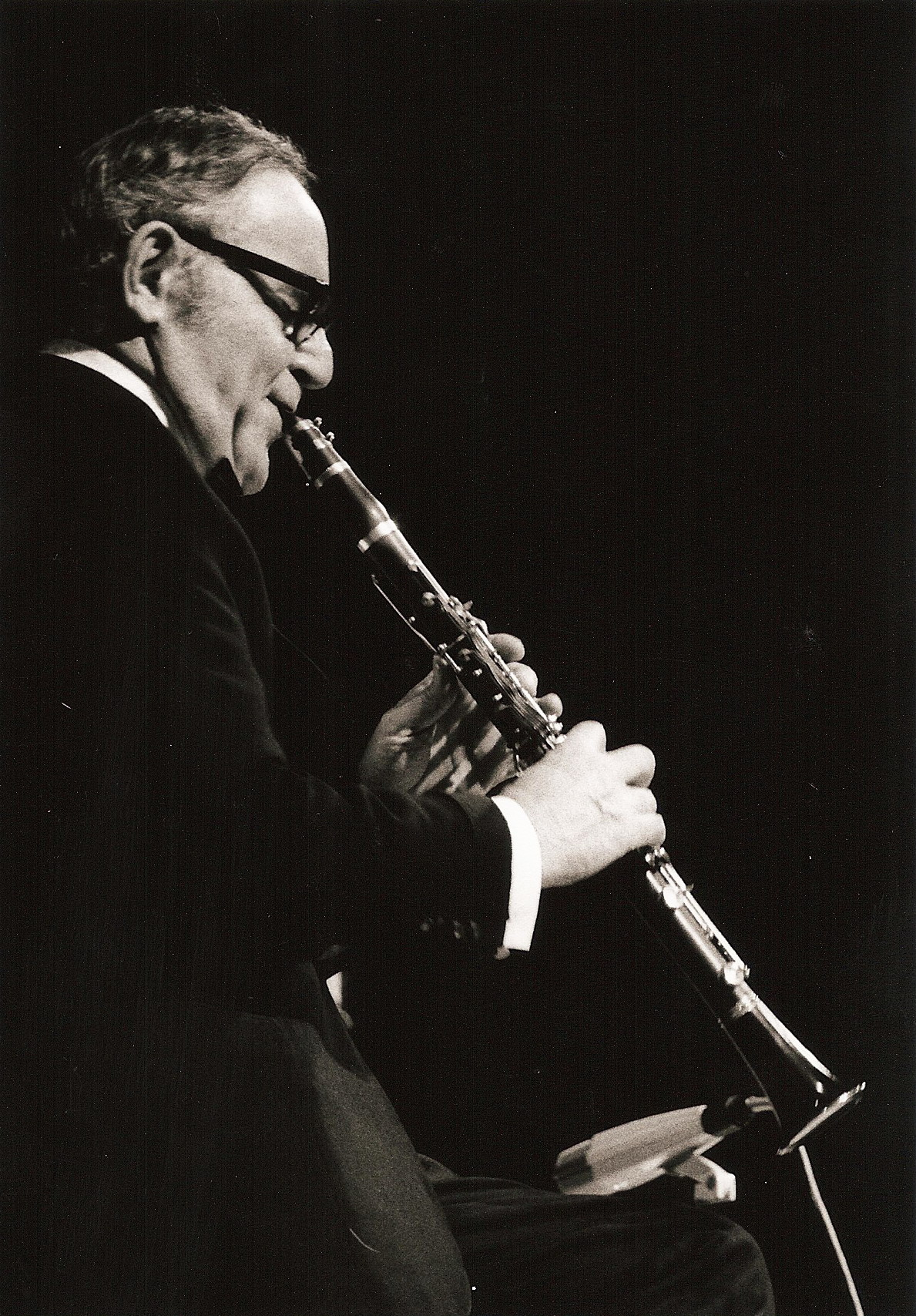
Goodman in concert in Nuremberg, West Germany (1971)

He continued to play on records and in small groups. In the early 1970s he collaborated with George Benson after the two met taping a PBS tribute to John Hammond, recreating some of Goodman's duets with Charlie Christian. Benson appeared on Goodman's album Seven Come Eleven. Goodman continued to play swing, but he practiced and performed classical pieces and commissioned them for clarinet. In 1960 he performed Mozart's Clarinet Concerto with conductor Alfredo Antonini at the Lewisohn Stadium in New York City.

=== Death and Legacy ===
Despite recurring health problems and heart trouble in his later years, Goodman continued to tour and perform, giving his final concert just six days before his death at the DuPage County Fairgrounds in Wheaton, Illinois. On the afternoon of June 13, 1986, Goodman died of a heart attack while taking a nap at his Manhattan House apartment on New York's East 66th Street. He was 77.

His passing prompted tributes across the jazz and cultural worlds. President Ronald Reagan released a statement praising Goodman as an American master whose "brilliance as a clarinetist and bandleader revolutionized popular music," while contemporaries celebrated his role in breaking the racial barrier in mid-1930s swing by integrating his small combos. Longtime collaborator Lionel Hampton remembered Goodman as "the greatest clarinet player of all time" and credited him with changing the social landscape of American music.

In accordance with his wishes, Goodman was honored with a small, private graveside service on June 16, 1986, attended only by immediate family and close friends. A eulogy was delivered by his close friend and personal attorney, William Hyland. Goodman was interred next to his wife, Alice Hammond Goodman (who had predeceased him in 1978), at Long Ridge Cemetery in Stamford, Connecticut, near his longtime country estate. Later that year, Goodman was posthumously awarded the Grammy Lifetime Achievement Award. Following his death, his massive personal musical estate—including unpublished arrangements, manuscripts, private concert recordings, and correspondence—was bequeathed to the Yale University Music Library, where it established the Benny Goodman Papers collection.

== Personal life ==
One of Goodman's closest friends was Columbia producer John Hammond, who influenced Goodman's move from Victor to Columbia. Goodman married Hammond's sister, Alice Frances Hammond Duckworth (1905–1978), on March 20, 1942. The couple had two daughters: Rachel, a concert pianist, and Benji, a cellist; Goodman also raised Alice's three daughters from her first marriage to British politician Arthur Duckworth. Rachel Goodman performed piano concerts with her father, starting when she was sixteen.

Goodman and Hammond had disagreements from the 1930s onwards. For the 1939 Spirituals to Swing concert Hammond had placed Charlie Christian into the Kansas City Six to play before Goodman's band, which had angered Goodman. They disagreed over the band's music until Goodman refused to listen to Hammond. Their arguments escalated, and in 1941 Hammond left Columbia. Goodman appeared on a 1975 PBS tribute to Hammond but remained at a distance. In the 1980s, after the death of Alice Goodman, Hammond and Goodman reconciled. On June 25, 1985, Goodman appeared at Avery Fisher Hall in New York City for "A Tribute to John Hammond".

Goodman was regarded by some as a demanding taskmaster, by others as an arrogant and eccentric martinet. Many musicians spoke of "The Ray", the glare that Goodman directed at a musician who failed to perform to his standards. After guitarist Allan Reuss incurred Goodman's displeasure, Goodman relegated him to the rear of the bandstand where his contribution would be drowned out by the other musicians. Vocalists Anita O'Day and Helen Forrest spoke bitterly of their experiences singing with Goodman: "The twenty or so months I spent with Benny felt like twenty years," said Forrest. "When I look back, they seem like a life sentence." He was generous and funded several college educations, though always secretly. When a friend asked him why, he said, "Well, if they knew about it, everyone would come to me with their hand out."

"As far as I'm concerned, what he did in those days—and they were hard days, in 1937—made it possible for Negroes to have their chance in baseball and other fields."

— Lionel Hampton on Benny Goodman

Goodman helped racial integration in America. In the early 1930s, black and white musicians could not play together in most clubs and concerts. In the Southern states, racial segregation was enforced by Jim Crow laws. Goodman hired Teddy Wilson for his trio and added vibraphonist Lionel Hampton for his quartet. In 1939 he hired guitarist Charlie Christian. This integration in music happened ten years before Jackie Robinson broke Major League Baseball's six-decade-long color line. According to Jazz (Episode 5) by Ken Burns, Lionel Hampton states that when someone asked Goodman why he "played with that nigger" (referring to Teddy Wilson), Goodman replied, "If you say that again to me, I'll take a clarinet and bust you across your head with it".

In 1962, the Benny Goodman Orchestra toured the Soviet Union as part of a cultural exchange program between the two nations after the Cuban Missile Crisis and the end of that phase of the Cold War; both visits were part of efforts to normalize relations between the United States and the USSR. Members of the band included Jimmy Knepper, Jerry Dodgion, and Turk Van Lake (Vanig Hovsepian). Bassist Bill Crow published a very colorful view of the tour and Goodman's conduct during it under the title "To Russia Without Love".

== Awards and honors ==
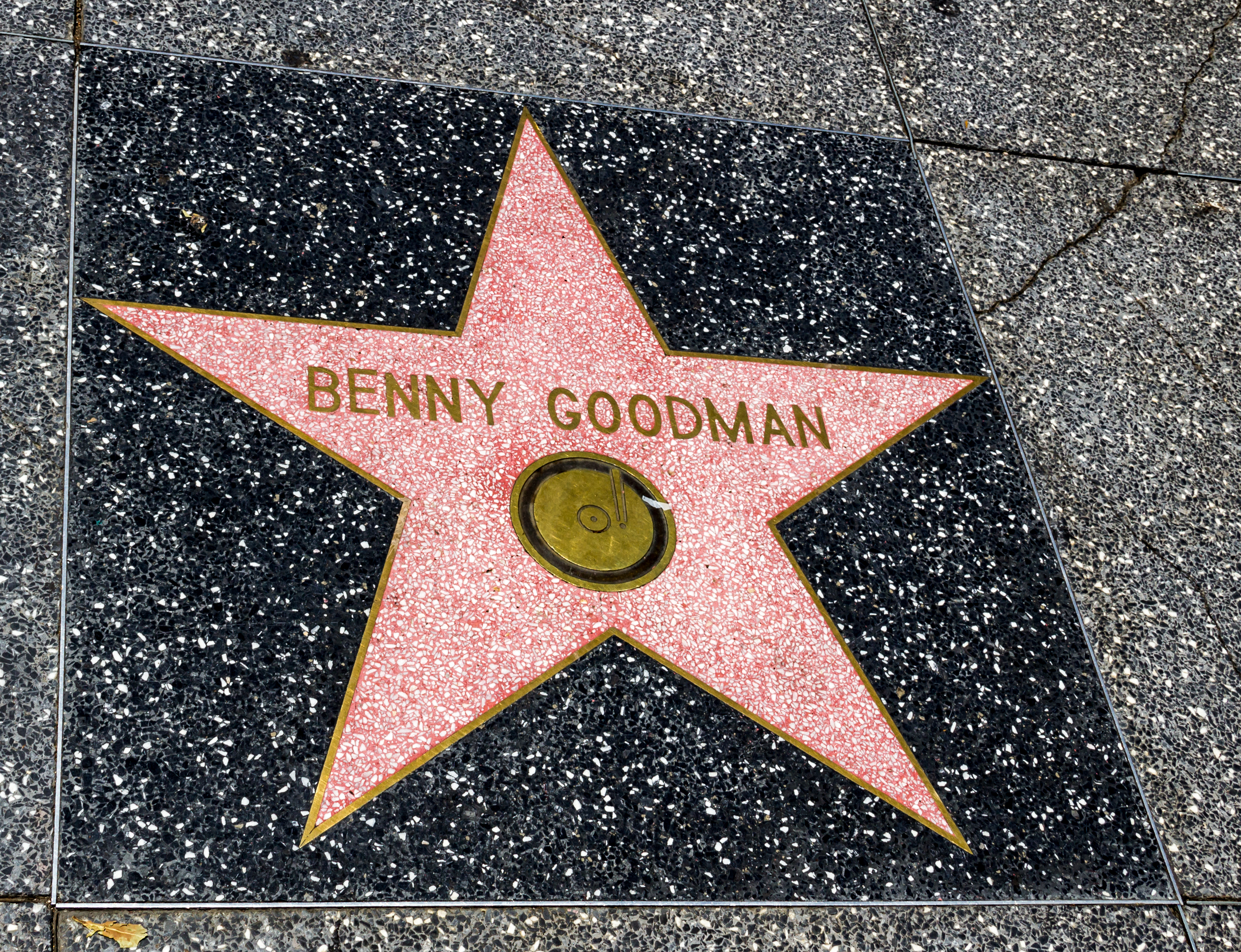
Goodman's star on Hollywood Walk of Fame

Goodman was honored with the Grammy Lifetime Achievement Award.

After winning polls as best jazz clarinetist, Goodman was inducted into the DownBeat Jazz Hall of Fame in 1957.

He was a member of the radio division of the National Association of Broadcasters Hall of Fame.

His papers were donated to Yale University after his death. He received honorary doctorates from Union College, the University of Illinois, Southern Illinois University Edwardsville, Bard College, Brandeis University, Columbia University, Harvard University, and Yale University.

== Discography ==
=== Selected albums ===
- Benny Goodman's Sextet (1944)
- Benny Goodman Sextet Session (1947)
- The Famous 1938 Carnegie Hall Jazz Concert (1950)
- 1937/38 Jazz Concert No. 2 (1952)
- Benny Goodman in Moscow (1962)

=== Selected singles ===
- "Sing, Sing, Sing" (1938)
- "I Got It Bad (and That Ain't Good)" (1941) – vocal chorus by Peggy Lee; US No. 25
- "Somebody Else Is Taking My Place" (1941) – vocal chorus by Peggy Lee; US No. 5
- "Winter Weather" (1941) – vocal chorus by Peggy Lee and Art London; US No. 24
- "Jersey Bounce" (1942) – US No. 1
- "My Little Cousin" (1942) – vocal chorus by Peggy Lee; US No. 14
- "We'll Meet Again" (1942) – vocal chorus by Peggy Lee; US No. 16
- "Why Don't You Do Right" (1942) – vocal chorus by Peggy Lee; US No. 4
- "Taking a Chance on Love" (1943, re-issue) – vocal chorus by Helen Forrest; US No. 1
- "Symphony" (1945) – vocal chorus by Liza Morrow; US No. 5
- "For Every Man There's a Woman" (1948) – with Peggy Lee; US No. 25

== See also ==
- The Benny Goodman Story

== Bibliography ==
- Firestone, Ross (1993). Swing, Swing, Swing: The Life & Times of Benny Goodman. New York: Norton. ISBN 0-393-03371-6.
