= The Complete Commodore & Decca Masters =

Box set by Billie Holiday
- Released: 2009
- Recorded: April 20, 1939 – March 8, 1950
- Genre: Vocal jazz
- Label: Hip-O
- Producer: Milt Gabler

Professional ratings
Review scores
| Source | Rating |
|---|---|
| AllMusic | 5/5 stars |
| All About Jazz | (favorable) |

The Complete Commodore & Decca Masters is a 3CD box set of recordings by Billie Holiday, released by Hip-O Records in 2009, compiling all the master takes released as 78 rpm singles by Commodore and Decca Records. It includes an essay by Ashley Kahn.

== Background ==
In 1939, Columbia Records refused to let Billie Holiday record the anti-lynching protest song "Strange Fruit". Milt Gabler invited her to record it for his small specialty label Commodore Records, and Columbia granted her a one-time exemption from her contract to do so, in which she recorded four songs (material for two 78 rpm records). "Strange Fruit", backed with "Fine and Mellow", turned out to be the biggest selling record of her career. Although she continued to record for Columbia, in 1944, following the 1942–44 musicians' strike, Holiday permanently left Columbia for Commodore. Small labels like Commodore had been quicker to settle with the musician's union than large labels like Columbia, thus Holiday was able to return to recording quicker by switching to the smaller label. The Commodore tracks were more dominated by torch songs and dramatic ballads than her swing oriented Columbia material had been, although her later Columbia sides (e.g. "God Bless the Child") show she had already been evolving in this direction.

Later the same year, Holiday then followed Gabler to Decca Records, to record "Lover Man". Decca had allowed Gabler to keep his own label, while also being employed by them, so long as he directed all potential hits to Decca. Both Holiday and Gabler suspected "Lover Man" had the potential to be a hit, thus it became her first Decca single, and indeed another of her biggest hits. "Lover Man" was notable for featuring a string section, and all her Decca tracks typically featured string arrangements and even choral backing, rather than jazz combos. This was Holiday's choice, as strings were often used in the white pop records of the day, and when she recorded "Lover Man" she wanted the same sound offered to artists like Bing Crosby, and specifically her friend Frank Sinatra. During this same period, Holiday began performing in concert halls rather than nightclubs, and her live performances became more theatrical than jazz, with many of these dramatic songs becoming centrepieces of her set. Holiday continued to record for Decca throughout the 1940s, before again switching to Norman Granz's Clef label (later Verve) in the next decade.

The orchestras Holiday recorded with while at Commodore and Decca were variously led by Toots Camarata, Bob Haggart, Bill Stegmeyer, John Simmons, Buster Harding, Sy Oliver, and Gordon Jenkins.

"Big Stuff" was a Leonard Bernstein single, with Billie doing a new vocal to a song Bernstein had written as the prologue to his 1944 ballet Fancy Free. The B-side was another Bernstein song from the ballet, without Holiday – "Fancy Free (Galop Variation and Finale)" performed by the Ballet Theatre Orchestra Under Direction of Leonard Bernstein.

"You Can't Lose a Broken Heart" and "My Sweet Hunk o' Trash" were collaborations with Louis Armstrong.

"Guilty" was the only track not originally released as a 78 rpm record, first appearing on the much later compilation LP The Blues Are Brewin' (Decca – DL 8701) in 1958.

== Track listing ==
=== Disc one: The Commodore Recordings ===
| Track | Title | Writer(s) | Date recorded | Catalog number | Release date | Length |
|---|---|---|---|---|---|---|
| 1. | "Strange Fruit" | Abel Meeropol | April 20, 1939 | Commodore 526-a | 1939 | 3:12 |
| 2. | "Yesterdays" | Jerome Kern, Otto Harbach | April 20, 1939 | Commodore 527-a | 1939 | 3:24 |
| 3. | "Fine and Mellow" | Billie Holiday | April 20, 1939 | Commodore 526-b | 1939 | 3:16 |
| 4. | "I Gotta Right to Sing the Blues" | Harold Arlen and Ted Koehler | April 20, 1939 | Commodore 527-b | 1939 | 2:49 |
| 5. | "How Am I to Know" | Jack King, Dorothy Parker | March 25, 1944 | Commodore 569-b | 1944 | 2:43 |
| 6. | "My Old Flame" | Sam Coslow, Arthur Johnston | March 25, 1944 | Commodore 585-b | 1944 | 3:01 |
| 7. | "I'll Get By" | Fred E. Ahlert and Roy Turk | March 25, 1944 | Commodore 553-b | 1944 | 2:58 |
| 8. | "I Cover the Waterfront" | Johnny Green, Edward Heyman | March 25, 1944 | Commodore 559-a | 1944 | 3:29 |
| 9. | "I'll Be Seeing You" | Sammy Fain and Irving Kahal | April 1, 1944 | Commodore 553-a | 1944 | 3:30 |
| 10. | "I'm Yours" | Johnny Green and Yip Harburg | April 1, 1944 | Commodore 585-a | 1944 | 3:16 |
| 11. | "Embraceable You" | George Gershwin and Ira Gershwin | April 1, 1944 | Commodore 7520-a | 1944 | 3:15 |
| 12. | "As Time Goes By" | Herman Hupfeld | April 1, 1944 | Commodore 7520-b | 1944 | 3:10 |
| 13. | "He's Funny That Way" | Richard Whiting, Neil Moret | April 8, 1944 | Commodore 569-a | 1944 | 3:15 |
| 14. | "Lover Come Back To Me" | Sigmund Romberg, Oscar Hammerstein II | April 8, 1944 | Commodore 559-b | 1944 | 3:19 |
| 15. | "I Love My Man (Billie's Blues)" | Billie Holiday | April 8, 1944 | Commodore 7519-a | 1944 | 3:07 |
| 16. | "On The Sunny Side Of The Street" | Jimmy McHugh and Dorothy Fields | April 8, 1944 | Commodore 7519-b | 1944 | 3:01 |

=== Disc two: The Decca Recordings ===
| Track | Title | Writer(s) | Date recorded | Catalog number | Release date | Length |
|---|---|---|---|---|---|---|
| 1. | "Lover Man" | Jimmy Davis, Roger ("Ram") Ramirez, and James Sherman | October 4, 1944 | Decca – 23391a | 1945 | 3:15 |
| 2. | "No More" | Toots Camarata and Bob Russell | October 4, 1944 | Decca – 23483a | 1946 | 2:45 |
| 3. | "That Ole Devil Called Love" | Allan Roberts and Doris Fisher | November 8, 1944 | Decca – 23391b | 1945 | 2:52 |
| 4. | "Don't Explain" | Billie Holiday and Arthur Herzog Jr. | August 14, 1945 | Decca – 23565a | 1946 | 3:20 |
| 5. | "You Better Go Now" | Bickley Reichner and Robert Graham | August 14, 1945 | Decca – 23483b | 1946 | 2:29 |
| 6. | "What Is This Thing Called Love?" | Cole Porter | August 14, 1945 | Decca – 23565b | 1946 | 3:09 |
| 7. | "Good Morning Heartache" | Irene Higginbotham, Ervin Drake, and Dan Fisher | January 22, 1946 | Decca – 23673a | 1946 | 3:05 |
| 8. | "No Good Man" | Irene Higginbotham, Dan Fisher, Sammy Gallop | January 22, 1946 | Decca – 23673b | 1946 | 3:04 |
| 9. | "Big Stuff" | Leonard Bernstein | March 13, 1946 | Decca – 23463a | 1946 | 2:29 |
| 10. | "Baby, I Don't Cry Over You" | Morton Krouse | April 9, 1946 | Decca – 23957a | 1946 | 3:09 |
| 11. | "I'll Look Around" | George Cory and Douglass Cross | April 9, 1946 | Decca – 23957b | 1946 | 3:12 |
| 12. | "The Blues Are Brewin'" | Eddie DeLange and Louis Alter | December 27, 1946 | Decca – 48259a | 1951 | 3:02 |
| 13. | "Guilty" | Richard Whiting, Harry Akst, and Gus Kahn | December 27, 1946 | (unreleased on 78?) | 1958 | 3:11 |
| 14. | "Deep Song" | George Cory and Douglass Cross | February 13, 1947 | Decca – 24138a | 1947 | 3:10 |
| 15. | "There Is No Greater Love" | Isham Jones, Marty Symes | February 13, 1947 | Decca – 23853a | 1947 | 2:56 |
| 16. | "Easy Living" | Ralph Rainger and Leo Robin | February 13, 1947 | Decca – 24138b | 1947 | 3:10 |
| 17. | "Solitude" | Duke Ellington, Eddie DeLange and Irving Mills | February 13, 1947 | Decca – 23853b | 1947 | 3:07 |
| 18. | "Weep No More" | Gordon Jenkins and Tom Adair | December 10, 1948 | Decca – 24551a | 1949 | 3:19 |
| 19. | "Girls Were Made to Take Care of Boys" | Ralph Blane | December 10, 1948 | Decca – 24551b | 1949 | 3:11 |

=== Disc three: The Decca Recordings Continued ===
| Track | Title | Writer(s) | Date recorded | Catalog number | Release date | Length |
|---|---|---|---|---|---|---|
| 1. | "Porgy (I Love You)" | George Gershwin and Ira Gershwin | December 10, 1948 | Decca – 24638a | 1949 | 2:54 |
| 2. | "My Man" | Jacques Charles, Channing Pollock, Albert Willemetz, and Maurice Yvain | December 10, 1948 | Decca – 24638b | 1949 | 2:55 |
| 3. | "Ain't Nobody's Business If I Do" | Porter Grainger and Everett Robbins | August 17, 1949 | Decca – 24726a | 1949 | 3:19 |
| 4. | "Baby Get Lost" | Leonard Feather and Billy Moore, Jr | August 17, 1949 | Decca – 24726b | 1949 | 3:13 |
| 5. | "Keeps On A-Rainin'" | Spencer Williams and Max Kortlander | August 29, 1949 | Decca – 27145a | 1950 | 3:14 |
| 6. | "Them There Eyes" | Maceo Pinkard, Doris Tauber and William Tracey | August 29, 1949 | Decca – 27145b | 1950 | 2:49 |
| 7. | "Do Your Duty" | Wesley 'Sox' Wilson | September 8, 1949 | Decca – 48259b | 1951 | 3:14 |
| 8. | "Gimme a Pigfoot (and a Bottle of Beer)" | Wesley 'Sox' Wilson | September 8, 1949 | Decca – 24947a | 1950 | 2:43 |
| 9. | "You Can't Lose a Broken Heart" | James P. Johnson and Flournoy E. Miller | September 30, 1949 | Decca – 24758a | 1949 | 3:13 |
| 10. | "My Sweet Hunk o' Trash" | James P. Johnson and Flournoy E. Miller | September 30, 1949 | Decca – 24758b | 1949 | 3:18 |
| 11. | "Now or Never" | Billie Holiday and Curtis Reginald Lewis | September 30, 1949 | Decca – 24947b | 1950 | 3:15 |
| 12. | "You're My Thrill" | Jay Gorney and Sidney Clare | October 19, 1949 | Decca – 24796a | 1949 | 3:22 |
| 13. | "Crazy He Calls Me" | Carl Sigman and Bob Russell | October 19, 1949 | Decca – 24796b | 1949 | 3:02 |
| 14. | "Please Tell Me Now" | Arnold Clawson and Toussaint Pope | October 19, 1949 | Decca – 24857a | 1950 | 3:12 |
| 15. | "Somebody's on My Mind" | Billie Holiday and Arthur Herzog Jr. | October 19, 1949 | Decca – 24857b | 1950 | 2:55 |
| 16. | "God Bless the Child" | Billie Holiday | March 8, 1950 | Decca – 24972a | 1950 | 3:08 |
| 17. | "This Is Heaven to Me" | Ernest Schweikert and Frank Reardon | March 8, 1950 | Decca – 24972b | 1950 | 2:51 |

Billie Holiday's Commodore and Decca recordings have been compiled many times, beginning with 78rpm albums in the 1940s and then 10 inch vinyl LPs. Some compilations also include many alternate takes of the songs, but only the master takes originally released as 78 rpm singles are included in this set.

== Personnel ==
=== April 20, 1939 (tracks 1-1 to 1-4) ===
- Billie Holiday – vocals
- Frank Newton – trumpet
- Tab Smith – soprano saxophone, alto saxophone
- Kenneth Hollon, Stanley Payne – tenor saxophone
- Jimmy McLin – guitar
- Sonny White – piano
- John Williams – bass
- Eddie Dougherty – drums

=== March 25, 1944 (tracks 1-5 to 1-8), April 1, 1944 (tracks 1-9 to 1-12) & April 8, 1944 (tracks 1-13 to 1-16) ===
- Billie Holiday – vocals
- Doc Cheatham – trumpet (except April 8, 1944)
- Vic Dickenson – trombone (except April 8, 1944)
- Lem Davis – alto saxophone (except April 8, 1944)
- Teddy Walters – guitar (March 25, 1944)
- Eddie Heywood – piano, arranger
- John Simmons – bass
- Sid Catlett – drums

=== October 4, 1944 (tracks 2-1 & 2-2) & November 8, 1944 (track 2-3) ===
- Billie Holiday – vocals
- Toots Camarata – conductor
  - Russ Case – trumpet
  - Jack Cressey, Hymie Schertzer
  - Paul Ricci (October 4, 1944), Dave Harris (November 8, 1944), Larry Binyon – tenor saxophone
  - Carl Kress – guitar
  - Dave Bowman – piano
  - Haig Stephens – bass
  - Johnny Blowers (October 4, 1944), George Wettling (November 8, 1944) – drums

=== August 14, 1945 (tracks 2-4 to 2-6) ===
- Billie Holiday – vocals
- Bob Haggart – conductor, bass
  - Joe Guy – trumpet
  - Bill Stegmeyer – alto saxophone
  - Armand Camgros, Hank Ross – tenor saxophone
  - Stan Webb – baritone saxophone
  - Tiny Grimes – guitar
  - Sammy Benskin – piano
  - Specs Powell – drums

=== January 22, 1946 (tracks 2-7 & 2-8) ===
- Billie Holiday – vocals
- Bill Stegmeyer – conductor, alto saxophone
  - Joe Guy, Chris Griffin – trumpet
  - Armand Camgros, Hank Ross, Bernard Kaufman – tenor saxophone
  - Tiny Grimes – guitar
  - Joe Springer – piano
  - John Simmons – bass
  - Sid Catlett – drums

=== March 13, 1946 (track 2-9) ===
- Billie Holiday – vocals
- Joe Guy – trumpet
- Tiny Grimes – guitar
- Joe Springer – piano
- Billy Taylor – bass
- Kelly Martin – drums

=== April 9, 1946 (tracks 2-10 & 2-11) ===
- Billie Holiday – vocals
- Joe Guy – trumpet
- Jimmy Shirley – guitar
- Billy Kyle – piano
- Thomas Barney – bass
- Kenny Clarke – drums

=== December 27, 1946 (tracks 2-12 & 2-13) ===
- Billie Holiday – vocals
- John Simmons – conductor, bass
  - Rostelle Reese – trumpet
  - Lem Davis – alto saxophone
  - Bob Dorsey – tenor saxophone
  - Bobby Tucker – piano
  - Denzil Best – drums

=== February 13, 1947 (tracks 2-14 to 2-17) ===
- Billie Holiday – vocals
- Bob Haggart – conductor, bass
  - Billy Butterfield – trumpet
  - Bill Stegmeyer – alto saxophone, clarinet
  - Al Klink, Toots Mondello – alto saxophone
  - Hank Ross, Art Drellinger – tenor saxophone
  - Dan Perry – guitar
  - Bobby Tucker – piano
  - Bunny Shawker – drums

=== December 10, 1948 (tracks 2-18 & 2-19) & December 10, 1948 (tracks 3-1 & 3-2) ===
- Billie Holiday – vocals
- Mundell Lowe – guitar (December 10, 1948)
- Bobby Tucker – piano
- John Levy – bass
- Denzil Best – drums

=== August 17, 1949 (tracks 3-3 & 3-4) ===
- Billie Holiday – vocals
- Buster Harding – conductor
  - Emmett Berry, Buck Clayton, Jimmy Nottingham – trumpet
  - George Matthews, Dicky Wells – trombone
  - Rudy Powell, George Dorsey – alto saxophone
  - Lester Young, Joe Thomas – tenor saxophone
  - Sol Moore – baritone saxophone
  - Mundell Lowe – guitar
  - Horace Henderson – piano
  - George Duvivier – bass
  - Shadow Wilson – drums

=== August 29, 1949 (tracks 3-5 & 3-6) ===
- Billie Holiday – vocals
- Sy Oliver – conductor
  - Bernie Privin, Dick Vance, Tony Faso – trumpet
  - Henderson Chambers, Mort Bullman – trombone
  - Johnny Mince, George Dorsey – alto saxophone
  - Budd Johnson, Freddie Williams – tenor saxophone
  - Eddie Barefield – baritone saxophone, clarinet
  - Everett Barksdale – guitar
  - Horace Henderson – piano
  - George Duvivier – bass
  - Cozy Cole – drums

=== September 8, 1949 (tracks 3-7 & 3-8) ===
- Billie Holiday – vocals
- Sy Oliver – conductor
  - Lester "Shad" Collins, Bobby Williams, Buck Clayton – trumpet
  - Henderson Chambers, George Stevenson – trombone
  - Pete Clark, George Dorsey – alto saxophone
  - Budd Johnson, Freddie Williams – tenor saxophone
  - Dave McRae – baritone saxophone
  - Everett Barksdale – guitar
  - Horace Henderson – piano
  - Joe Benjamin – bass
  - Wallace Bishop – drums

=== September 30, 1949 (tracks 3-9 to 3-11) ===
- Billie Holiday – vocals
- Louis Armstrong – vocals (except "Now or Never")
- Sy Oliver – conductor
  - Bernie Privin – trumpet
  - Sid Cooper, Johnny Mince – alto saxophone
  - Art Drellinger, Pat Nizza – tenor saxophone
  - Everett Barksdale – guitar
  - Billy Kyle – piano
  - Joe Benjamin – bass
  - Jimmy Crawford – drums

=== October 19, 1949 (tracks 3-12 to 3-15) ===
- Billie Holiday – vocals
- Gordon Jenkins & His Orchestra – strings
  - Bobby Hackett – trumpet
  - Milt Yaner – clarinet, alto saxophone
  - John Fulton – clarinet, flute, tenor saxophone
  - Tony Mottola – guitar
  - Bernie Leighton – piano
  - Jack Lesberg – bass
  - Bunny Shawker – drums

=== March 8, 1950 (tracks 3-16 & 3-17) ===
- Billie Holiday – vocals
- Gordon Jenkins & His Orchestra – strings
  - Gordon Jenkins Singers – background vocals
  - Dick "Dent" Eckles – flute, tenor saxophone
  - Bob Bain – guitar
  - Charlie LaVere – piano
  - Lou Butterman – bass
  - Nick Fatool – drums
