= Tommy Dorsey (1937–1941) =

Studio album by Tommy Dorsey & His Orchestra
- Released: 1976
- Genre: Jazz, big band, swing
- Label: Amiga

Tommy Dorsey (1937–1941) is an album released in Germany by Amiga featuring works by Tommy Dorsey & His Orchestra.

== Track listing ==
=== Side A ===
Track	Song Title	Length of Recording
1.	"Stop, Look and Listen"; Arranged by G. Van Eps	5:15
2.	"Boogie Woogie"; Arranged by Deane Kincaide, Composed by P. Smith	3:08
3.	"Well, Alright"; Composed by Faye, Howell, Raye	3:15
4.	"Tea for Two"; Composed by Caesar, V. Youmans	2:00
5.	"East of the Sun"; Arranged by Sy Oliver, Composed by Bowman	3:04
6.	"Swanee River"; Arranged by Sy Oliver, Composed by S. Foster	3:12
7.	"Swing High"; Arranged by Sy Oliver Composed by Sy Oliver	2:45
8.	"Swanee River"; Arranged by Sy Oliver, Composed by Dublin, Burke	4:36

=== Side B ===
Track	Song Title	Length of Recording
1.	"Stomp It Off"; Arranged by Sy Oliver Composed by Jimmy Lunceford, Sy Oliver	3:50
2.	"Stop, It's Wonderful"; Arranged by Sy Oliver Composed by Reichner, Boland	2:46
3.	"Easy Does It"; Arranged by Sy Oliver Composed by Oliver Young	3:32
4.	"Deep River"; Arranged by Sy Oliver Composed by Hammerstein	3:58
5.	"Yes, Indeed!"; Arranged by Sy Oliver Composed by Sy Oliver	3:29
6.	"Swing Low, Sweet Chariot"; Arranged by Deane Kincaide	3:59
7.	"Swingin' On Nothin'"; Arranged and Composed by Sy Oliver	3:15
8.	"Loose Lid Special"; Arranged and Composed by Sy Oliver	2:46

== Personnel ==
- Arranger - Sy Oliver
- Bass - Gene Traxler, Sid Weiss
- Clarinet - Johnny Mince
- Drums - Buddy Rich, Cliff Leeman, Dave Tough, Maurice Purtill
- Guitar - Carmen Mastren, Clark Yocum
- Liner Notes [1976] - Karlheinz Drechsel
- Piano - Howard Smith, Joe Bushkin
- Saxophone - Babe Russin, Bruce Snyder, Bud Freeman, Deane Kincaide, Don Lodice, Fred Stulce, Heinie Beau, Johnny Mince, Mannie Gershman, Mike Doty, Paul Mason, Skeets Herfurt
- Alto Saxophone - Hymie Schertzer
- Trombone - Dave Jacobs, Elmer Smithers, George Arus, Les Jenkins, Lowell Martin, Moe Zudekoff, Red Bone (2), Tommy Dorsey, Ward Silloway
- Trumpet - Al Steams, Andy Ferretti, Bunny Berigan, Charles Peterson, Charlie Spivak, Chuck Peterson, Clyde Hurley, Jimmy Blake, Joe Bauer, Lee Castaldo, Mickey Bloom, Pee Wee Erwin, Ray Linn, Tommy Dorsey, Yank Lawson, Ziggy Elman
