= Stop, Look and Listen (Tommy Dorsey album) =

Stop, Look & Listen

Compilation album by Tommy Dorsey
- Released: 1994
- Recorded: September 26, 1935 – July 1, 1942
- Genre: Jazz, swing, big band
- Length: 76:06
- Label: ASV/Living Era

Professional ratings
Review scores
Source	Rating
AllMusic	4/5 stars

Stop, Look & Listen is a 1994 release, featuring Tommy Dorsey and His Orchestra's work prior to their collaborations with Frank Sinatra, featuring songs from the late 1930s through the early 1940s.

== Track listing ==
Track	Song Title	Length
1.	Weary Blues; Composed by George Cates, Bud Green, Artie Matthews	3:17
2.	Royal Garden Blues; Composed by Clarence and Spencer Williams	2:52
3.	After You've Gone; Composed by Henry Creamer, Turner Layton	2:57
4.	Maple Leaf Rag; Composed by Scott Joplin	2:31
5.	Marie; Composed by Irving Berlin	3:17
6.	Song of India; Composed by Nikolai Rimsky-Korsakov	3:07
7.	Liebestraum; Composed by Franz Liszt	3:35
8.	Stop, Look and Listen; Composed by Ralph Freed, George Van Eps	5:18
9.	Beale Street Blues; Composed by W.C. Handy	3:17
10.	Night and Day; Composed by Cole Porter	2:33
11.	Symphony Riffs; Composed by Benny Carter	3:18
12.	Boogie Woogie; Composed by Pinetop Smith	3:05
13.	Tin Roof Blues; Composed by Walter Melrose	3:26
14.	Davenport Blues; Composed by Bix Beiderbecke	3:17
15.	Lonesome Road, Pt. 1&2; Composed by Gene Austin, Nat Shilkret	4:55
16.	Stomp It Off; Composed by Jimmie Lunceford, Sy Oliver	3:49
17.	Easy Does It; Composed by Sy Oliver, Trummy Young	3:34
18.	Swanee River; Composed by Stephen Foster	3:16
19.	Mandy, Make Up Your Minds; Composed by Grant Clarke, Arther Johnston, George C. Meyer, Roy Turk	3:00
20.	Twilight in Turkey; Composed by Raymond Scott	3:21
21.	He's a Gypsy from Poughkeepsie; Composed by Emery Deutsch, Bud Green	3:07
22.	Chinatown, My Chinatown; Composed by William Jerome, Jean Schwartz	3:06
23.	The Sheik of Araby; Composed by Harry Beasley Smith, Ted Snyder, Francis Wheeler	2:23

== Credits ==
=== Personnel ===
- Alto sax: Clyde Rounds, Hymie Schertzer, Fred Stulce, Harry Schuchman, Sid Stonebum, Slats Long, Joe Dixon, Noni Bernardi, Mike Doty, Skeets Herfurt, Johnny Mince
- Bass: Phil Stevens, Gene Traxler, Sid Weiss
- Clarinet: Fred Stulce, Sid Stonebum, Joe Dixon, Mike Doty, Don Lodice, Johnny Mince, Bud Freeman
- Drums: Moe Purtill, Dave Tough, Sam Rosen, Cliff Leeman, Buddy Rich
- Guitar: Carmen Mastren, William Schaffer, Clark Yocum, Mac Cheikes
- Piano: Milt Raskin, Howard Smith, Joe Bushkin, Dick Jones, Paul Mitchell
- Tenor Sax: Clyde Rounds, John Van Eps, Sid Block, Bob Bunch, Heine Beau, Skeets Herfurt, Don Lodice, Deane Kincaide, Bud Freeman
- Trombone: Lowell Martin, David Jacob, Elmer Smithers, Ward Silloway, Cliff Weston, Walter Mercurio, Ben pickering, Earle H. Hagen, George Arus, Red Bone, Tommy Dorsey, Les Jenkins
- Trumpet: Jimmy Welch, Jimmy Blake, Mickey Bloom, Sammy Shapiro, Jimmy Zito, Joe Bauer, Charlie Peterson, Pee Wee Erwin, Ziggy Elman, Lee Castle, Charlie Spivak, Yank Lawson, Max Kaminsky, Bunny Berigan, Steve Lipkins, Bill Graham, Bob Cusmano, Joe Bauer, Andy Ferrati, Sam Skolnick
