= Yes Indeed! (Tommy Dorsey album) =

Yes, Indeed!

Compilation album by Tommy Dorsey
- Released: 1990
- Recorded: Jun 15, 1939 – Sep 20, 1945
- Genre: Jazz, swing, big band
- Length: 67:30
- Label: RCA/Bluebird

Professional ratings
Review scores
Source	Rating
AllMusic	5/5 stars

Yes, Indeed! is an album by Tommy Dorsey and his Orchestra, released in 1990 by RCA/Bluebird. The album contains recordings of Tommy Dorsey from 1939 to 1945.

== Track listing ==
Track	Song Title	Length of Recording
1.	"Lonesome Road, Pt. 1"; Composed by Gene Austin, Nat Shilkret	2:35
2.	"Lonesome Road, Pt. 2"; Composed by Gene Austin, Nat Shilkret	2:17
3.	"Well All Right (Tonight's the Night)"; Composed by Frances Faye, Dan Howell, Don Raye	3:11
4.	"Night in Sudan"; Composed by Tommy Dorsey	3:12
5.	"Stomp It Off"; Composed by Jimmie Lunceford, Sy Oliver	3:43
6.	"Easy Does It"; Composed by Sy Oliver, Trummy Young	3:32
7.	"Quiet Please (It's the Drummer in Me)"; Composed by Sy Oliver	2:45
8.	"So What"; Composed by Sy Oliver	2:41
9.	"Swing High"; Composed by Sy Oliver	2:48
10.	"Swanee River"; Composed by Stephen Foster	3:13
11.	"Deep River"; Composed by Traditional	3:56
12.	"Yes, Indeed!"; Composed by Sy Oliver	3:28
13.	"Loose Lid Special"; Composed by Sy Oliver	2:46
14.	"Swingin' on Nothin'"; Composed by Billy Moore, Sy Oliver	3:15
15.	"Hallelujah!"; Composed by Clifford Grey, Leo Robin, Vincent Youmans	3:01
16.	"Moonlight on the Ganges"; Composed by Sherman Myers, Chester Wallace	2:53
17.	"Well, Git It!"; Composed by Sy Oliver	3:01
18.	"Mandy"; Composed by Irving Berlin	2:57
19.	"Opus One"; Composed by Sy Oliver	2:54
20.	"Chloe"; Composed by Gus Kahn, Neil Moret	3:12
21.	"At the Fat Man's"; Composed by Sy Oliver	3:09
22.	"The Minor Goes Muggin'"; Composed by Sy Oliver	3:01

== Personnel ==
- Arranger: Sy Oliver
- Clarinetist: Johnny Mince
- Composers: Gene Austin, Nat Shilkret, Frances Faye, Dan Howell, Don Raye, Jimmie Lunceford, Sy Oliver, Stephen Foster, Billy Moore, Sherman Myers, Chester Wallace, Irving Berlin, Gus Kahn, Neil Moret
- Drums: Buddy Rich
- Tenor Saxophonist: Don Lodice
- Trombone: Tommy Dorsey
- Trumpeter: Ziggy Elman
