= Yes Indeed =

Yes Indeed may refer to:

== Music ==
=== Albums ===
- Yes Indeed! (Pat Boone album), a 1958 album by Pat Boone
- Yes Indeed! (Ray Charles album), a 1958 album by Ray Charles
- Dinah, Yes Indeed!, a 1958 album by Dinah Shore
- Yes Indeed! (Claude Hopkins album), a 1960 album by jazz pianist Claude Hopkins
- Yes Indeed! (Tommy Dorsey album), a 1990 compilation album by Tommy Dorsey and His Orchestra
- Yes Indeed! (Jo Stafford album), 2002

=== Songs ===
- "Yes, Indeed!" (1941 song), a song written by Sy Oliver and covered by Bing Crosby, Pat Boone and many others
- "Yes, Indeed", a song written and recorded by Teena Marie from her 1981 album It Must Be Magic
- "Yes Indeed" (Lil Baby and Drake song), a song by Lil Baby from his 2018 album Harder Than Ever

== See also ==
- Dinah, Yes Indeed!, a 1959 album by Dinah Shore
