= Walt Yoder =

American jazz double-bassist (1914–1978)

- Born: Walter Yoder; April 21, 1914
- Died: December 2, 1978 (aged 64)
- Genres: Jazz
- Occupation: Musician
- Instrument: Double bass

Walt Yoder (April 21, 1914 – December 2, 1978) was an American jazz double-bassist, best known for his association with Woody Herman.

A piano player from age ten, Yoder switched to bass as a teenager. He worked in the bands of Joe Haymes, Tommy Dorsey, and Jimmy Dorsey early in the 1930s. Yoder played with Herman in Isham Jones's band in the middle of the 1930s. After this ensemble dissolved in 1936, Herman formed a new group with five of Jones's former sidemen, including Yoder. He remained with Herman through 1942 and played with him again in 1947-48.

Following his tenure with Herman, Yoder played with Ben Pollack, Russ Morgan, Bob Crosby, and Red Nichols. He did some works as a bandleader and in the studios near Los Angeles later in his life, playing into the 1970s.
