= MSSM =

MSSM may refer to:

- Maine School of Science and Mathematics
- Martin-Smith School of Music
- Minimal Supersymmetric Standard Model
- Mount Sinai School of Medicine
