= The One and Only Tommy Dorsey =

- CD reissue cover

Studio album by Tommy Dorsey
- Released: 1961
- Genre: Jazz
- Label: RCA Camden

The One and Only Tommy Dorsey is an album released in 1961 featuring Tommy Dorsey and his band playing, accompanied by a number of singers such as Frank Sinatra, Jack Leonard, Jo Stafford, Edythe Wright, and the Pied Pipers.

== Track listing ==
=== Side one ===
Track	Song Title	Length
1.	Whatcha Know Joe? Composed by Victor Young	3:24
2.	The Lonesome Road; Composed by Nathaniel Shilkret	4:55
3.	The Call of the Canon; Composed by Billy Hill	3:08
4.	Way Down Yonder In New Orleans; Composed by Henry Creamer	2:49
5.	Too Romantic; Composed by Johnny Burke, Jimmy Monaco	3:11

=== Side two ===
Track	Song title	Length
1.	The Lady Is A Tramp; Composed by Lorenz Hart, Richard Rodgers	2:54
2.	A Sinner Kissed An Angel; Composed by Mac David, Ray Joseph, Larry Shanye	2:56
3.	Night in Sudan; Composed by Tommy Dorsey	3:15
4.	Turn Off The Moon	2:43
5.	Be Careful, It's My Heart; Composed by Irving Berlin	2:49

== Credits ==
=== Composers ===
- Billy Hill
- Jimmy Monaco
- Nathaniel Shilkret
- Henry Creamer
- Turner Layton
- Victor Young
- Richard Rodgers
- Lorenz Hart
- Irving Berlin
- Mac David
- Ray Joseph
- Larry Shayne

=== Performers ===
- Tommy Dorsey & His Orchestra
- Frank Sinatra
- Edythe Wright
- Jack Leonard
- The Pied Pipers
- Jo Stafford
