= Stop, Look and Listen =

Stop, Look and Listen or Stop, Look, Listen may refer to:

- "Stop, Look, Listen, Think" (and similar), a procedure promoted by the Green Cross Code, a UK pedestrian safety campaign
- "Stop, Look, and Listen", a railroad crossing safety phrase, often seen on crossing signs

== Film and television ==
- Stop, Look and Listen (film), a 1926 film featuring Oliver Hardy
- Stop Look and Listen (film) (note lack of comma), a comedy short by Chuck Menville and Len Janson
- Stop, Look and Listen (game show) or Celebrity Time, a 1948-52 American TV quiz show
- Stop, Look, Listen, a British children's programme broadcast by ITV Schools
- Stop, Look and Listen!, a Blue's Clues episode compilation video
- Stop, Look and Listen, a Hi-5 compilation video

== Music ==
- Stop! Look! Listen!, a 1915 Broadway musical revue
- Stop, Look & Listen (Patsy Cline album), 1986
  - "Stop, Look and Listen" (song), 1956
- Stop, Look and Listen (Tommy Dorsey album), or the title song, 1994
- "Stop, Look and Listen", a song by Donna Summer from the album She Works Hard for the Money
- "Stop, Look, Listen (To Your Heart)", a song by The Stylistics, also covered by Marvin Gaye and Diana Ross
- "Stop Look and Listen", a song by Devo from Hardcore Devo: Volume One
- "Stop, Look, Listen", a song by Ricky Nelson covered as "Stop, Look and Listen" by Bill Haley & His Comets and Elvis Presley.
- "Stop, Look and Listen", a song by Josie and the Pussycats from Josie and the Pussycats
- "Stop, Look, Listen", a song by MC Lyte from Eyes on This
- "Stop! Look! Listen!", a song by Da Buzz, for Melodifestivalen 2003
- Look Stop Listen, a 1983 album by Philly Joe Jones Dameronia
- "Rubberneckin'", a song by Elvis Presley, often misidentified as "Stop, Look and Listen" due to having the other song's title in its lyrics.

== See also ==
- Stop! Look! And Hasten!, a 1954 Merrie Melodies cartoon
- Stop, Look and Laugh, a 1960 Three Stooges film
- "Stop, Look and Be Safe", an episode of Barney & Friends
- Stop! Luke! Listen!, a 1917 short comedy film featuring Harold Lloyd
