= It's D'Lovely 1947–1950 =

Compilation album by Tommy Dorsey
- Released: 2004
- Recorded: Feb 25, 1947–Jun 13, 1950
- Genre: Jazz, swing, big band
- Label: Hep

It's D'Lovely 1947–1950 is a 2004 album consisting of a series of recordings by Tommy Dorsey from the late 1940s. It displays Dorsey's focus on the swing jazz big band style, despite the growing popularity of bop at the time.

Professional ratings
Review scores
Source	Rating
Allmusic	4/5 stars

== Track listing ==
Track	Song Title	Length
1.	But I Do Mind if You Don't; Composed by Nemo	3:05
2.	That's Life I Guess; Composed by Cole, George	3:30
3.	Kate; Composed by Irving Berlin	2:43
4.	Baby, Baby All the Time; Composed by Bobby Troup	3:13
5.	TD's Boogie Woogie; Composed by Deane Kincaide	6:30
6.	Let Me Call You Sweetheart; Composed by Leo Friedman, Beth Slater Whitson	3:37
7.	You Know What the Trouble Is Baby; Composed by Sy Oliver	3:19
8.	Puddlewump; Composed by Charlie Shavers	3:20
9.	The Continental; Composed by Con Conrad, Herbert Magidson	3:28
10.	Ain'tcha Glad I Love You; Composed by Bartley/MacRae/White	3:24
11.	The Knock Song; Composed by Austin	3:14
12.	Why Shouldn't I Composed by Cole Porter	3:11
13.	Just One of Those Things; Composed by Cole Porter	3:02
14.	I Get a Kick Out of You; Composed by Cole Porter	2:55
15.	It's D'Lovely; Composed by Cole Porter	2:38
16.	You Do Something to Me; Composed by Cole Porter	2:16
17.	Love for Sale; Composed by Cole Porter	2:25
18.	Lullaby in Boogie; Composed by Cohen	3:29
19.	I Ought to Know More About You; Composed by Edward Heyman, Victor Young	3:03
20.	Comin' Through the Rye; Composed by Traditional	3:19
21.	I Hadn't Anyone Till You; Composed by Ray Noble	3:21
22.	Happy Feet; Composed by Roy Ross, Al Stillman	3:12
23.	Way Down Yonder in New Orleans; Composed by Henry Creamer, Turner Layton	2:50
24.	Original Dixieland One Step; Composed by D.J. LaRocca	2:33

== Credits ==
- Clarinets: Johnny Mince, Peanuts Hucko, Buddy DeFranco
- Cornets: Bobby Hackett
- Pianist: Teddy Wilson
- Tenor Sax: Corky Corcoran
- Trombone: Tommy Dorsey
- Trumpets: Charlie Shavers, Ziggy Elman
- Vocals: Hannah Williams
