= Everybody's Doing It =

Everybody's Doing It may refer to:

== Film and television ==
- Everybody's Doing It (1916 film)
- Everybody's Doing It (1938 film)
- Everybody's Doing It, a 2002 MTV television film starring Lizzy Caplan
- Everybody's Doing It, a 1919 short comedy film from featuring Mutt and Jeff

== Music ==
- "Everybody's Doin' It", a 1911 ragtime song by Irving Berlin (see "That Mysterious Rag")
- "Everybody's Doing It", a recording by Tommy Dorsey from 1935–1947, released in 1991 on Music Goes Round and Round
- "Everybody's Doing It", a song recorded by June Richmond in 1951 with the Quincy Jones Orchestra
- "Everybody's Doing It", a track by Mike Nichols & Elaine May from the 1958 comedy album Improvisations to Music
- "Everybody's Doin' It", a track by Commander Cody and His Lost Planet Airmen from the 1973 album Country Casanova
- "Everybody's Doing It", a track by Black Lips from the 2005 album Let It Bloom
- "Everybody's Doing It", a track by The Howling Hex from the 2007 album The Howling Hex XI
- "Everybody's Doing It", a track by Bob Schneider from the 2009 album Lovely Creatures
- "Everybody's Doing It", a track by Evermore from their 2010 self-titled album

== See also ==
- "Spin (Everybody's Doin' It)", a 2002 single by Vanessa Amorosi from the album Change
