= The Sentimentalists =

American close harmony singing group

- Also known as: The Clark Sisters
- Origin: North Dakota, United States
- Years active: 1935–1977
- Past members: Mary Clark; Peggy Clark Schwartz; Ann Clark; Jean Clark

The Sentimentalists, also known as the "Clark Sisters" and also as the "Original" Clark Sisters; so-called to distinguish them from the later gospel music group of the same name, were an American close harmony singing group, consisting of sisters Mary Clark Branson, Peggy Clark Schwartz, Ann Clark Terry, and Jean Clark Friley. Hailing from Grand Forks, North Dakota, they were a mere 17 to 23 years of age when they signed with the Tommy Dorsey Band in 1944 to replace the popular Pied Pipers, after the Pipers had quit Dorsey's band to go out on their own.

Although they never achieved the fame and fortune of some of their contemporaries, like The Andrews Sisters and The McGuire Sisters, the Clark Sisters' recordings are highly prized by jazz aficionados for their unique vocal stylings in which they often emulate instrumental sections.

== Early history ==
The Clark Sisters were born and raised in Grand Forks, North Dakota. They began singing as young children, and by the late 1930s were performing together in civic events and church services. After achieving some local fame, the sisters traveled by train to New York City, where they appeared several times on the Major Bowes Amateur Hour. Although they did not win, they did receive a contract to appear for several months in a USO show.

Following their USO tour, they returned to New York. Tommy Dorsey was looking for a vocal quartet to replace one of his band's most popular features, the Pied Pipers: He had become angry at one of the Pipers for sending him in the wrong direction at the train station in Portland, Oregon, and fired him. The Pipers, out of "team loyalty", resigned en masse. At that moment, the #1 record on the charts was "There Are Such Things" sung by Frank Sinatra and the Pied Pipers; it was the last RCA record they did with Dorsey.

The sisters auditioned for Dorsey in their West 45th Street apartment, where he offered them a job on the spot.

== Emerging popularity ==
Following their initial few appearances on Dorsey's radio program, for which they were not credited) he began to receive mail from listeners wondering about the identities of the new vocalists. Realizing he had a potential threat to the vocal domination of The Andrews Sisters, he made plans to build them into regular and featured appearances on his show.

However, rather than allowing the Sisters to be billed under their own names, he recast them as "The Sentimentalists", a name which he had previously utilized for a small instrumental combo. Since he "owned" the name, he was confident that he could avoid a repeat of the incident with the Pied Pipers.

Although the Sisters had to begin by learning all of the Pipers' songs with the band, they were soon able to grow into their own artistic voice as well. This was helped along by the willingness of Dorsey's band members, particularly lead alto saxophonist and arranger Sid Cooper, as well as Nelson Riddle, guitarist Bob Bain, Sy Oliver and Buddy Defranco, to write and arrange musical numbers that featured the Sisters' talents to their fullest. The Sisters' "wholesome" good looks and extrovert personalities had endeared them to the members of Dorsey's band, who became their friends, and acted protectively towards them.

Peggy Clark Schwartz, the widow of clarinetist Willie Schwartz of the Glenn Miller Orchestra, later recalled, in the Tommy Dorsey biography, authored by Peter Levinson, that she and her sisters may have been a little naïve when they originally went to work for Dorsey: "In those days, you had to be young and stupid. You also had to be pretty needy ... it was almost comical when you look at it; it was part of the growing-up process!"

While with Dorsey's Band, the Sisters had several hit records, including "I Should Care", "On the Atchison, Topeka and the Santa Fe", "On the Sunny Side of the Street", a version of "Chicago" (with Sy Oliver) and "Why Do I Love You?", from the musical Show Boat.

== Later years ==
In 1953, the Clark Sisters made the decision to leave the Dorsey organization, primarily due to Dorsey's failure to pay them what they felt they were worth, as well as their desires to quit touring and devote themselves to family and to recording. True to his original intentions, Dorsey refused to allow them to continue to use the "Sentimentalists" name, and would not allow them to reference in their publicity information that they had ever been known under that name.

Despite this setback, the Sisters persisted and, in addition to continuing to perform well into the 1960s, they recorded three albums under the "Clark Sisters" name, and under the Coral Records label. In 1990 however, Jasmine Dream Records acquired the rights to the master tapes, and re-released the three albums, compiled into a single CD, titled, The Clark Sisters Swing Again.

The Clark Sisters also sang the original soundtrack to "Walt Disney's Enchanted Tiki Room" at Disneyland. Peggy Clark Schwartz and Ann Clark Terry sang in the choruses of many television shows, including Judy Garland, Andy Williams, Carol Burnett and Sonny and Cher.

Ann Clark Terry died on January 10, 2026, at the age of 103.

== Sources ==
- Tommy Dorsey: Livin' In A Great Big Way by Peter J. Levinson (Da Capo Press)
