= Tommy Dorsey: The Early Jazz Sides: 1932 – 1937 =

Tommy Dorsey: The Early Jazz Sides: 1932 - 1937

Compilation album by Tommy Dorsey
- Released: 2004
- Genre: Jazz, swing
- Label: Jazz Legends

Professional ratings
Review scores
Source	Rating
Allmusic	4/5 stars

Tommy Dorsey: The Early Jazz Sides: 1932 – 1937 is a compilation album assembled by Jazz Legends mainly featuring Tommy Dorsey's works from the 1930s during his association with RCA Victor.

== Track listing ==
Track	Song Title	Length
1.	"Three Moods"; Composed by Tommy Dorsey	3:06
2.	"Weary Blues"; Composed by Artie Matthews	3:18
3.	"I've Got a Note"; Composed by Edward Pola	2:47
4.	"I'm Getting Sentimental Over You"; Composed by George Bassman/Ned Washington	3:38
5.	"The Music Goes 'Round and Around"; Composed by Eddie Farley/Red Hodgson/Mike Riley	3:23
6.	"Rhythm saved the World"; Composed by Sammy Cahn/Saul Chaplin	3:16
7.	"Royal Garden Blues"; Composed by Clarence Williams/Spencer Williams	2:51
8.	"Ja-Da"; Composed by Bob Carlton	2:22
9.	"At the Codfish Ball"; Composed by Sidney Mitchell/Lew Pollack	3:11
10.	"That's A-Plenty"; Composed by Ray Gilbert/Lew Pollack/Bert Williams	3:01
11.	"After You've Gone (song)" Composed by Henry Creamer/Turner Layton	2:55
12.	"Maple Leaf Rag"; Composed by Scott Joplin	2:31
13.	"Keepin' Out of Mischief Now"; Composed by Andy Razaf/Fats Waller	2:47
14.	"Mr. Ghost Goes to Town"; Composed by Will Hudson/Irving Mills/Mitchell Parish	3:17
15.	"Who'll Buy My Violets?"; Composed by James Weldon Johnson/José Padilla	3:15
16.	"Melody in F"; Composed by Anton Rubinstein	2:56
17.	"Marie"; Composed by Irving Berlin	3:18
18.	"Mendelssohn's Spring Song"; Composed by Felix Mendelssohn	2:35
19.	"They All Laughed"; Composed by Ira Gershwin/George Gershwin	2:57
20.	"Dark Eyes"; Composed by Traditional	3:30
21.	"Jammin'"; Composed by Sam Coslow	2:20

== Credits ==
- Arranger: Paul Weston
- Liner Notes: Scott Yanow
- Tenor Sax: Bud Freeman
- Trombone: Tommy Dorsey
- Trumpeter: Bunny Berigan
