= Edythe Wright =

American singer

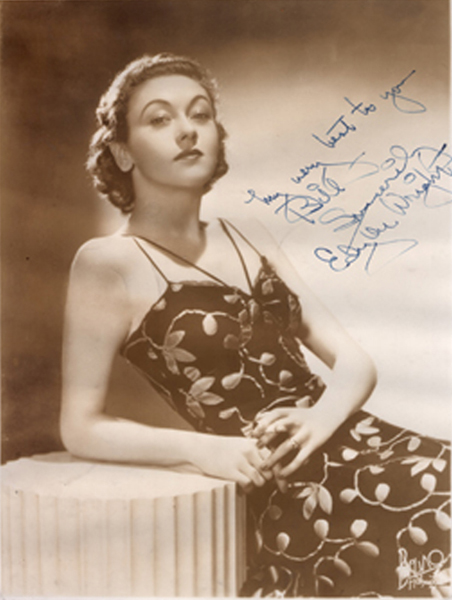

Background information
- Born: August 16, 1916
- Died: October 27, 1965 (aged 49) Point Pleasant, New Jersey
- Genres: Jazz, swing
- Occupation: Singer
- Years active: 1935–1943

Edythe Wright (August 16, 1916 – October 27, 1965) was an American singer who performed from 1935 to 1939 with the band led by Tommy Dorsey.

== Early life ==
Wright grew up in Highland Park, New Jersey.

== Early career ==
Wright debuted on radio in March 1935, singing with Paul Whiteman's Rhythm Trio. That performance led to her becoming the singer in the Sunset Room of the Robert Treat Hotel in Newark, New Jersey. By the end of that month, she was also singing "7 to 10 presentations a week" on WOR radio. She sang with Frank Crum's orchestra in the Sunset Room and later performed with Lennie Hayton's orchestra. In May 1935, while singing with Crum's orchestra, she made six recordings for Brunswick Records.

Wright's early exposure on network radio came via appearances with the orchestras of Frank Dailey and Joe Haymes. She won the job with Dailey out of 500 women who auditioned, enabling her to be heard six nights a week on CBS. Her network debut came on August 31, 1935, when she sang with Dailey's orchestra from the Meadowbrook Ballroom in Cedar Grove, New Jersey.

== Big Band era ==
Wright became the first female singer with Dorsey's band after he left the Dorsey Brothers Orchestra to start his own group. Her career spanned from September 1935 through August 1939.

Wright's acquaintance with an executive at Brown & Williamson tobacco company helped to secure a radio program for the Dorsey band. She was a fixture on radio (Jack Pearl Show).

== Post-Dorsey era ==
After Wright left Dorsey's group, she had a solo singing act. In September 1940, she was joined by Ruth Lowe, forming a new act that debuted in Boston, Massachusetts. In 1943, she starred on Victory Caravan, a variety show on radio station WIP in Philadelphia, Pennsylvania.

== Personal life ==
She married John T. Smith. They had a son, Patrick.

== Death ==
Wright died of pancreatic cancer at the Point Pleasant Hospital on October 27, 1965.
