= Tommy Dorsey's Dance Party =

Studio album by Tommy Dorsey
- Released: 1966
- Genres: Jazz; swing
- Label: Vocalion

Tommy Dorsey's Dance Party is a 1966 jazz album featuring Tommy Dorsey and various other artists.

== Track listing ==
=== Side one ===
Track	Song Title	Length of Recording
1.	Cheek to Cheek; Composed by Irving Berlin	3:02
2.	Louisiana Hayride; Composed by Arthur Schwartz, Howard Dietz	
3.	I'll Know; Composed by Frank Loesser	2:46
4.	Grieg's Gotto; Composed by Edvard Grieg	2:00
5.	Solitaire; Composed by King Guion, Rene Gorek, Carl Nutter	3:04
6.	Ain't She Sweet; Composed by Milton Ager, Jeck Yellen	2:44

=== Side two ===
Track	Song Title	Length of Recording
1.	Oh! Look At Me Now; Composed by Joe Bushkin, John De Vries	2:56
2.	(I'm In Heaven When I See You Smile) Diane; Composed by Erno Rapee, Lew Pollack	
3.	Ritual Fire Dance; Composed by Manuel De Falla	2:11
4.	You're Not In My Arms Tonight; Composed by Victor Young, Ned Washington	2:57
5.	It's A Lovely Day Today; Composed by Irving Berlin	3:06
6.	Goin' Home; Composed by Ben Homer, Danny Homer	2:48
