= Pee Wee Erwin =

American jazz trumpeter (1913–1981)

Background information
- Born: George Erwin; May 30, 1913; Falls City, Nebraska, U.S.
- Died: June 20, 1981 (aged 68) Teaneck, New Jersey, U.S.
- Genres: Swing, big band
- Occupation: Musician
- Instrument: Trumpet

George "Pee Wee" Erwin (May 30, 1913 – June 20, 1981) was an American jazz trumpeter.

== Biography ==
He was born in Falls City, Nebraska, United States. Erwin started on trumpet at age four. He played in several territory bands before joining the groups of Joe Haymes (1931–33) and Isham Jones (1933–34). He then moved to New York City, where he was prolific as a studio musician, performing on radio and in recording sessions. He played with Benny Goodman in 1934-35, then with Ray Noble in 1935; the next year he rejoined Goodman, taking Bunny Berigan's empty chair. In 1937, he again followed Berigan, this time in Tommy Dorsey's orchestra, where he remained until 1939.

Erwin led his own big band in 1941-42 and 1946. In the 1950s, he settled in New Milford, New Jersey, and played Dixieland jazz in New Orleans, and in the 1960s formed his own trumpet school with Chris Griffin; among its graduates was Warren Vaché. Erwin played up until the year of his death, recording as a leader for United Artists in the 1950s and issuing six albums in 1980 and 1981, the last two years of his life.

In May 1981, Erwin performed at the Breda Jazz Festival in the Netherlands, weeks before his death in Teaneck, New Jersey, at the age of 68.

== Discography ==
- 1953: The Land of Dixie (Brunswick)
- 1955: Accent on Dixieland (Urania)
- 1956: Dixieland at Grandview Inn (Cadence)
- 1958: Oh, Play That Thing! (United Artists)
- 1959: Down by the Riverside (United Artists)
- 1980: In New York (Qualtro)
- 1980: Swingin' That Music (Jazzology)
- 1980: Pee Wee in Hollywood (Qualtro)
- 1990: Dixieland Ramble (Broadway Intermission) – contains radio transcriptions probably from the 1950s and a 1965 live session)
- 2000: Dr. Jazz (Storyville) – with Vic Dickenson, all tracks recorded in 1952
