= Sol Moore =

American jazz musician

1949 image of Sol Moore.

Sol Moore, also known as "Pee Wee Moore", (8 April 1919 – 7 November 1999) was an American jazz saxophonist and clarinetist active from the 1930s into the 1950s. He should not be confused with saxophonist Pee Wee Moore (1928–2009). He made recordings with Floyd Ray, Dizzy Gillespie, Les Hite, and Billie Holiday.

== Life and career ==
Sol Moore graduated from the Martin-Smith School of Music in Harlem. In the late 1930s he was a member of the Jeter-Pillars Orchestra; playing both alto and baritone saxophone. In 1939 he was a member of Floyd Ray's band with whom he toured and recorded. He played with Dizzy Gillespie in the Les Hite big band in 1939–42 before recording with Gilliespie's ensemble in 1946-47.

Moore was drafted into the United States Army in 1942, and served in the military during World War II from 1942 to 1945. After the war he formed his own band whose members included Bujie Ward (drums), Ivan "Red" Milton (alto sax), John Brown (tenor sax), George Smith (trumpet), William "Muscles" Swanson (bass), and Billy Hutchins (piano and vocals). The group performed often in Harlem in the mid-20th century; most often at the Celebrity Club where the band was a fixture beginning in the latter half of the 1940s and extending into the early 1950s. Other places in New York they performed included the Audubon Ballroom and City College of New York.

In 1949 Moore recorded with Billie Holiday music which is included on The Complete Commodore & Decca Masters. In the 1950s he was active in New York as a jazz arranger and composer for other artists.
