= Joe Haymes =

American jazz bandleader & arranger (1907–1964)

- Born: Joseph Lawrence Haymes; February 10, 1907; Marshfield, Missouri, U.S.
- Died: July 10, 1964 (aged 57) Dallas, Texas, U.S.
- Genres: Jazz
- Occupations: Bandleader; arranger; musician
- Instrument: Piano
- Years active: 1928–1950s
- Labels: RCA Victor; ARC; Decca
- Formerly of: Ted Weems band; The Lawrence Welk Show

Joseph Lawrence Haymes (February 10, 1907 – July 10, 1964) was an American jazz bandleader and arranger.

== Life and career ==
Born in Marshfield, Missouri, United States, Haymes relocated with his family to Springfield, Missouri, after his railroader father was killed in an accident. Haymes attended Greenwood Laboratory School in Springfield and was a drummer in the local Boy Scout Band; as a youth, he also learned the piano. Attending Drury College from 1926, he played locally with his own dance band, before being hired as arranger by Ted Weems in 1928 and leaving school. Haymes arranged the hit "Piccolo Pete", among many others, for Weems, setting a new, highly jazz-informed style for the orchestra.

Haymes struck out on his own again in 1930, leading a band in Tulsa, Oklahoma. Billed as "a Ted Weems unit", Haymes continued to write Weems's arrangements. During 1931, the vocal trio The Merry Macs toured with the band. Relocating to New York City by 1932, the Haymes orchestra was briefly one of the country's hottest dance bands, with a particular knack for jazz novelties and recording on all three major labels, but in late 1933, he sold the band to actor-leader Buddy Rogers, beginning a habit of selling orchestras to others.

Among the players in Haymes's orchestras were Johnny Mince, Pee Wee Erwin, Toots Mondello, Chris Griffin, Sterling Bose, Bud Freeman, Walt Yoder, and Lee Castle.

Early in 1934, Haymes put together a swing group with assistance from arranger Spud Murphy, but after Tommy and Jimmy Dorsey split in 1935, Tommy arranged a deal with Haymes to take over the latter's group. Haymes himself hired several of Charlie Barnet's musicians for a new band, which recorded for ARC from 1935 until 1937, but was only modestly successful.

Haymes toured as an arranger with Les Brown in 1938, re-formed in 1939, and then found work writing and arranging anonymously for radio. He was briefly inducted into the U.S. Army in 1942, where he served as a medical orderly. On his return, he continued arranging for Hollywood studios from the 1940s into the late 1950s, interrupted by spells with Phil Harris and Johnnie Lee Wills. Haymes's chief employer during the 1950s was Lawrence Welk's television show, although he sometimes performed solo in the Los Angeles area playing at piano bars.

== Death ==
Around 1960, Haymes relocated to Dallas, Texas, then home to several semi-retired bandleaders (Ted Weems chief among them) who occasionally employed his scoring skills. Never married, Haymes died of heart failure at age 57. He is buried in his native Marshfield, Missouri.
