= Helen Elise Smith Dett =

American pianist and music educator

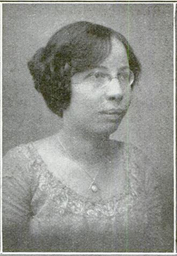
Helen Elise Smith Dett, in a 1917 publication.

Helen Elise Smith Dett (April 1888 – 2 October 1950) was an American pianist and music educator, the wife of composer Robert Nathaniel Dett. She was the first black graduate of the Damrosch Institute of Musical Art (now Juilliard School) and co-founder of the Martin-Smith School of Music in New York.

== Early life ==
Helen Elise Smith was born in New York City, daughter of Charles Smith, a butler from Maryland, and his wife, Josephine, from Louisiana. She graduated from the Damrosch Institute of Musical Art in 1907, becoming the school's first black graduate.

== Career ==
Beginning in 1912, Smith was co-founder and co-director of the Martin-Smith Music School in New York City, with violinist David I. Martin, which aimed to "give all deserving children an opportunity regardless of their ability to pay for instruction, to train professional musicians as missionaries to work in conjunction with other educational institutions, and to make special provision for pupils of unusual aptitude and talent to continue their work in more advanced schools". After marrying in 1916, she moved to the Hampton Institute (now Hampton University) in Virginia, where she taught piano and was frequently featured as an accompanist at concerts and recitals. She moved with her husband to Rochester, NY, and gave solo performances there while raising their two children. She also served as Secretary of the Rochester chapter of the NAACP. When her husband took a job at Bennett College in North Carolina she also taught piano there, but the family continued residing in Rochester. She sold the family home in Rochester by 1948 and relocated to the New York City area with her daughters.

== Personal life ==
Helen Elise Smith married composer and educator R. Nathaniel Dett in 1916. They had two daughters, Helen Dett Noyes Hopkins and Josephine Dett Gregory Breelove. She was widowed when Dett died in 1943.
