= Hymie Shertzer =

American jazz alto saxophonist (1909–1977)

Herman "Hymie" Shertzer or Schertzer (April 22, 1909 – March 22, 1977) was an American jazz alto saxophonist, best known for his long-term association with Benny Goodman.

Shertzer was born in New York City, United States, began playing violin when he was nine years old and picked up the saxophone when he was a teenager. He worked as a sideman for Gene Kardos at the club Birdland, then joined Benny Goodman's band, where he was the lead saxophonist until 1938, though he recorded with Goodman intermittently until the mid-1940s. He was in Tommy Dorsey's band from 1938-1940, and also recorded in the late 1930s with Bunny Berigan and Lionel Hampton. He worked with Billie Holiday in 1941 and again in 1944, then became a house musician for NBC radio and television. He worked as a session player for studio recordings of Ella Fitzgerald, Frank Sinatra, Sarah Vaughan, Sy Oliver, Louis Armstrong, and Artie Shaw in the period 1947-1953, and continued working with Goodman live, on television, and on record from 1951 until 1969. He was a member of the Tonight Show Band during its Johnny Carson era and was active in recording sessions until the mid-1970s.

He died in New York City, in March 1977, aged 67.
