= Sid Weiss =

American jazz musician

Sid Weiss (April 30, 1914 – March 30, 1994) was an American jazz double-bassist, active principally as a sideman for white jazz musicians in the 1930s and 1940s.

== Early life ==
Weiss was born in Schenectady, New York, on April 30, 1914. "He played violin, clarinet, and tuba before changing to double bass in his teens."

== Later life and career ==
Weiss started playing in New York around 1931, working that decade with Louis Prima, Bunny Berigan, Wingy Manone, Artie Shaw, Tommy Dorsey, Charlie Barnet, and Adrian Rollini. He was with Benny Goodman from 1941 to 1945, then played in the second half of the 1940s and the early 1950s with Muggsy Spanier, Pee Wee Russell, Cozy Cole, Bud Freeman, Duke Ellington, and Eddie Condon. He quit full-time performing after moving to Los Angeles in 1954. He died in San Bernardino County, California, on March 29, 1994.
