= Chris Griffin (musician) =

American jazz trumpeter (1915–2005)

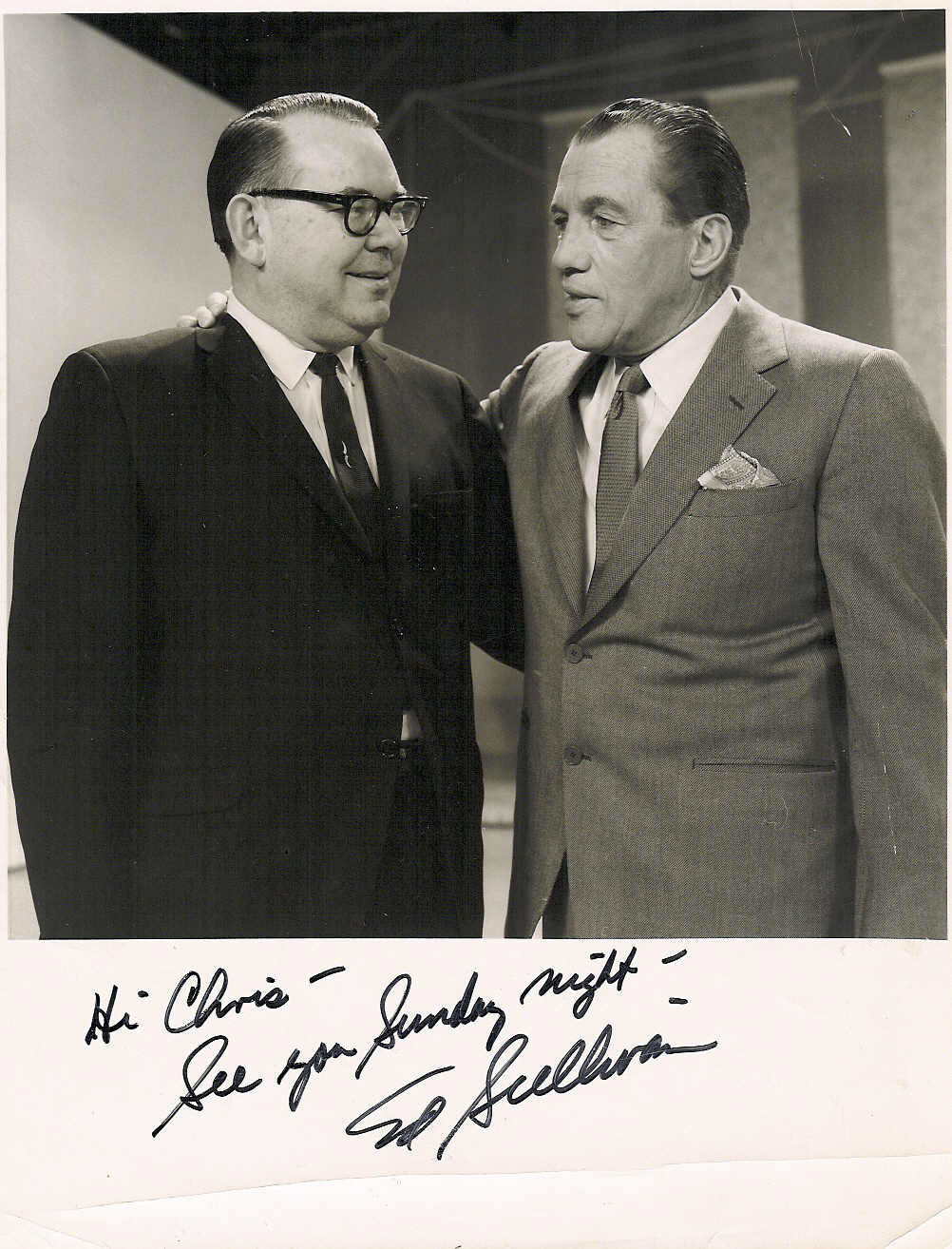
- Griffin (left) on The Ed Sullivan Show (1963)

Background information
- Born: Gordon Claude Griffin; October 31, 1915; Binghamton, New York, U.S.
- Died: June 18, 2005 (aged 89) Danbury, Connecticut, U.S.
- Genres: Jazz
- Occupation: Musician
- Instrument: Trumpet
- Spouse: Helen O'Brien (m. 1940–2000)

Gordon Claude "Chris" Griffin (October 31, 1915 – June 18, 2005) was an American jazz trumpeter.

== Biography ==
Griffin was born in Binghamton, New York, United States, but moved to White Plains at age ten; he began playing the trumpet at age 12 and played in dance bands as a teenager. In the mid-1930s, he worked with Charlie Barnet, Rudy Vallée, Miff Mole, Mildred Bailey, Teddy Wilson, and Joe Haymes, also working as a studio musician for CBS Radio broadcasting. In 1936, he joined Benny Goodman's big band, remaining with him until 1939. He appeared in several movies as a member of Goodman's ensemble, such as The Big Broadcast of 1937 and Hollywood Hotel, and was the last surviving member of Goodman's band to perform in the first major jazz event at Carnegie Hall, which was recorded and later released as The Famous 1938 Carnegie Hall Jazz Concert. In 1940, he performed with Jimmy Dorsey and occasionally returned to Goodman's band in the 1940s and 1950s, but primarily worked on staff at CBS from the late 1930s onward. He played trumpet for radio television soundtracks into the 1980s, including for The Ed Sullivan Show, The Jackie Gleason Show, Lucky Strike Hit Parade, Philip Morris Playhouse, and Camel Caravan.

Griffin and Pee Wee Erwin co-founded a trumpet education school, which operated from 1966 to 1970, and toured with Warren Covington in Europe in 1974. He worked with Tex Beneke, Bud Freeman, and Warren Vaché Sr. later in his career. In the 1980s, he led an ensemble of his own which included sidemen such as Marty Napoleon, Sonny Igoe, Jane Jarvis, and Major Holley.

Griffin was married to vocalist Helen O'Brien for 60 years until her death in 2000. The couple had four sons, one of whom also died in 2000, and two daughters. He died aged 89 in 2005 of melanoma at Danbury Hospital in Danbury, Connecticut.
