= Martin-Smith School of Music =

Music school in New York City, U.S.

The Martin-Smith School of Music (MSSM) was a music school at 139 W. 136th St in the Harlem neighborhood of Upper Manhattan, New York City, United States. Founded in 1912 by David I. Martin and Helen Elise Smith, the school was a significant music conservatory for African-Americans during the first half of the 20th century. The school was still active as late as 1953, but by 1969 its building was demolished.

== History ==
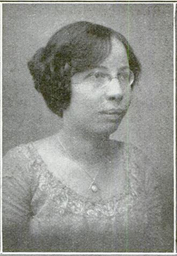
Helen Elise Smith, who co-founded the Martin-Smith School of Music with David I. Martin

The Martin-Smith School of Music was founded to serve black students at a time when many institutions of learning were racially segregated and denied admittance to African Americans. It was co-founded in 1912 by violinist David I. Martin and pianist Helen Elise Smith (later the wife of Robert Nathaniel Dett). According to musicologist Eileen Southern, it was "one of the most important black musical institutions in the country", an assessment echoed by historian Reid Badger. In its early years the peak enrollment at the school reached more than 300 students. It was an influential school during the era of the Harlem Renaissance.

The MSSM had both youth and adult orchestras conducted by Martin. The school also had a Ladies' Staff Orchestra founded c. 1915, an all-women ensemble that was directed by Mildred Gassaway Franklin. Walter F. Craig was an early supporter of the school, and many of its students and graduates were featured in concerts that he organized in the 1910s. On May 5, 1915, Scott Joplin's Frolic of the Bears was given its world premiere at the MSSM's annual recital concert. That same year the school hosted a recital given by Daisy Tapley. Later, the school sponsored one of Marian Anderson's earliest recitals.

In 1919 the Colored Music Settlement School was subsumed into the MSSM after its primary teacher, J. Rosamond Johnson, resigned. After Martin's death in 1923, his wife Gertrude took over the business management of the school and his son, violinist and MSSM graduate Eugene Mars Martin, was appointed director. When Eugene Mars died in 1926 he was succeeded as director by David I. Martin Jr. By 1929 the school enrollment had declined to 150 students with 12 music faculty teaching courses in harmony, music theory, strings, woodwinds, brass, voice, and piano. Enrollment increased in the 1930s, and in 1934 approximately 500 students were attending the school.

Gertrude succeeded David Jr. as director, and was still leading the school as late as 1953 when she was honored in a special tribute event by the National Association of Negro Musicians. She died in June 1954. By 1969 the school's building had been demolished and an article in New York Amsterdam News advocated for the placement of a memorial plaque to honor the MSSM.

== Faculty ==
Vocal music faculty at the school included sopranos Marie Selika Williams and Minnie G. Brown; concert tenor Sidney Woodward; and baritone Frank Goodall Harrison. The multi-instrumentalist, composer, and conductor Francis Eugene Mikell was another influential teacher at the school. Other faculty members included Irving Frederick Barnwell (violin), Andrew Fletcher Rosemond (violin), Tourgee DeBose (piano), Lou Hooper (piano), H. Leonard Jeter (cello), James R. C. Pinn (piano), Sonoma Talley (piano), Edwin Coates (piano / music theory), Jessie Ernestine Covington (piano), and Will Marion Cook.

== Alumni ==
Jazz trombonist George Matthews was a student at the school from 1927 to 1931. Other graduates of the school included cellists Clarissa Burton Cumbo and David Irwin Martin Jr.; violinists Winston Collymore, and Gertrude Martin (daughter of David and Gertrude); pianist Hugo Bornn; jazz bassists Chocolate Williams and Olivia Sophie L'Ange Shipp, jazz trumpeter Arthur Briggs; jazz saxophonist and clarinetist Sol Moore; and jazz keyboardist and arranger Skip Hall.
