= Bill Stegmeyer =

American jazz musician

Bill Stegmeyer (October 8, 1916 – August 19, 1968) was an American jazz clarinetist and arranger.

Stegmeyer attended Transylvania College from 1934 to 1936, and following his studies played with Austin Wylie (1937), Glenn Miller (1938), and Bob Crosby (1939–40). In the 1940s, he did arrangement work and played clarinet (and occasionally, saxophone) with Billy Butterfield, Yank Lawson, Bobby Hackett, Will Bradley, and Billie Holiday (1945–47). He arranged for WXYZ, a Detroit radio station, from 1948 to 1950, and following this arranged for Your Hit Parade (1950–58) and CBS (early 1960s). In the 1950s he also continued to play jazz, with Lawson, Butterfield, Bob Haggart, Jimmy McPartland, and Ruby Braff.

He died of cancer at age 51 in 1968. His only recordings as a leader were five tunes for Signature Records in 1945 and some V-Discs.
