= Music Goes Round and Round =

Compilation album by Tommy Dorsey & His Orchestra
- Released: June 1991
- Recorded: December 9, 1935 – February 25, 1947
- Genre: Jazz, swing, big band
- Label: Bluebird RCA

Professional ratings
Review scores
Source	Rating
AllMusic	4.5/5 stars

Music Goes Round and Round is a Tommy Dorsey album of Dixieland recordings from 1935 to 1947, that predated the New Orleans revival in 1940.

== Track listing ==
Track	Song title	Length
1.	"Tiger Rag"	2:48
2.	"The Music Goes Round and Round"	3:24
3.	"The Day I Let You Get Away"	2:50
4.	"Rhythm Saved The World"	3:18
5.	"At The Codfish Ball"	3:09
6.	"The Milkman's Matinee"	9:37
7.	"Twilight in Turkey"	2:52
8.	"He's a Gypsy from Poughkeepsie"	3:01
9.	"Is This Gonna Be My Lucky Summer?"	2:29
10.	"You're My Desire"	2:38
11.	"Am I Dreaming?"	2:33
12.	"After You"	3:26
13.	"The Lady Is a Tramp"	2:57
14.	"If the Man in the Moon Were a C**n"	3:12
15.	"Nice Work If You Can Get It"	2:23
16.	"When the Midnight Choo-Choo Leaves for Alabam'"	3:16
17.	"Everybody's Doing It"	2:57
18.	"Chinatown, My Chinatown"	3:04
19.	"The Sheik of Araby"	2:29
20.	"As Long as You Live (You'll Be Dead When You Die)"	2:58
21.	"Sailing at Midnight"	3:07
22.	"You Must Have Been a Beautiful Baby"	2:50
23.	"Alla en el Rancho Grande"	3:09

== Personnel ==
- Clarinet: Johnny Mince, Joe Dixon
- Tenor Sax: Bud Freeman
- Trombone: Tommy Dorsey
- Trumpeters: Yank Lawson, Max Kaminsky, Pee Wee Erwin
- Vocals: Edythe Wright
