= Yes, Indeed! (1941 song) =

1941 song by Sy Oliver

Song
- Released: 1941
- Genre: Swing
- Songwriter: Sy Oliver

"Yes, Indeed!" is a 1941 swing style song in the spiritual style, written by Sy Oliver. Originally, Oliver had written the song for his previous boss Jimmie Lunceford, who turned it down, believing it to be sacrilegious.

A recording by the Tommy Dorsey Orchestra charted in Billboard in the United States in the summer of 1941, peaking at No. 4.
