= Isham Jones =

American bandleader, saxophonist, bassist, and songwriter (1894–1956)

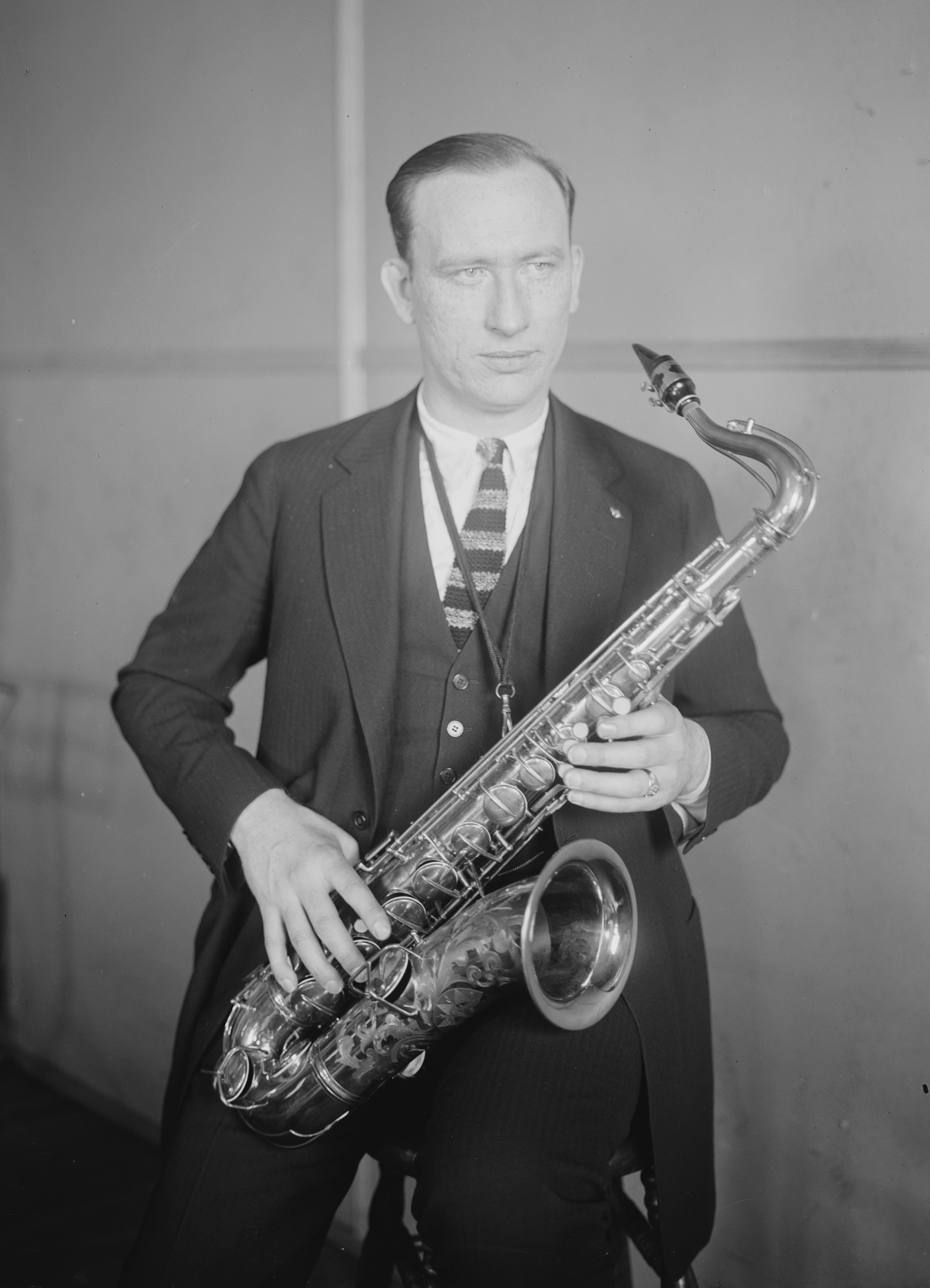
- Jones in the 1920s

Background information
- Born: Isham Edgar Jones; January 31, 1894; Coalton, Ohio, U.S.
- Origin: Saginaw, Michigan, U.S.
- Died: October 19, 1956 (aged 62) Hollywood, Florida, U.S.
- Genres: Traditional pop; early jazz
- Occupations: Musician; bandleader; songwriter
- Instruments: Saxophone; double bass; piano
- Years active: 1911–1938
- Labels: Brunswick; Victor; Decca; ARC
- Past members: Louis Panico; Benny Goodman; Woody Herman; Walt Yoder; Roy Bargy; Al Gallodoro

Isham Edgar Jones (January 31, 1894 – October 19, 1956) was an American bandleader, saxophonist, bassist, and songwriter.

== Career ==
Jones was born in Coalton, Ohio, United States, to a musical and mining family. His father, Richard Isham Jones (1865–1945), was a violinist. The family moved to Saginaw, Michigan, where Jones grew up and started his first ensemble for church concerts. In 1911, one of Jones's earliest compositions, "On the Alamo", was published by Tell Taylor Inc.

In 1915, Jones moved to Chicago, Illinois. He performed at the Green Mill Gardens, then began playing at Fred Mann's Rainbo Gardens. Chicago remained his home until 1932, when he settled in New York City. He also toured England with his orchestra in 1925.

In 1917, he composed the tune "We're in the Army Now" (also known as "You're in the Army Now") when the U.S. entered World War I; it was later popular during World War II and is played by the U.S. Army Band.

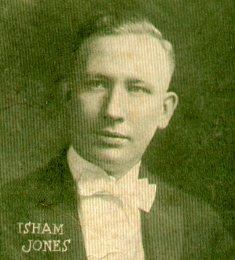
Jones in 1922

The Isham Jones band made a series of popular gramophone records for Brunswick throughout the 1920s. His first 26 sides, made at Rainbo Gardens, were credited to "Isham Jones' Rainbo Orchestra". By the end of 1920, the name was simply "Isham Jones' Orchestra".

He led one of the most popular dance bands in the 1920s and 1930s. His first successful recording, "Wabash Blues", written by Dave Ringle and Fred Meinken, was recorded in 1921. This million-seller stayed for twelve weeks in the U.S. charts, six at No. 1. It was awarded a gold disc by the RIAA. Noted musicians who played in Jones's band included Louis Panico, Benny Goodman (although no records were made during the short time he was with him), Woody Herman, Walt Yoder, and Roy Bargy. The reed virtuoso Al Gallodoro appeared briefly with Jones in 1933, taking part in a record date October 3.

From the start, Jones's Brunswick records were popular. There was a gap from October 1927 to June 1929 where Jones did not record due to disbanding and reorganization.

From 1929 to 1932, his Brunswick recordings became even more sophisticated with offbeat arrangements by Gordon Jenkins and others; Jones was his own arranger early on, but cultivated others. During this period, Jones started featuring violinist Eddie Stone as one of his regular vocalists. Stone had an unusual, almost humorous tone to his voice. His other vocalists included Frank Sylvano, Billy Scott, and Arthur Jarrett. In 1932, he added Joe Martin, another of the band's violinists, as a frequent vocalist. In April that year, young Bing Crosby recorded two sessions with Jones's group which included "Sweet Georgia Brown". Crosby at this point in his career was still singing in a jazz idiom, transitioning to his better known "crooner" style.

Isham Jones and His Orchestra in 1922

In August 1932, Jones signed with Victor, and these records are considered among the best arranged and performed commercial dance band records of the Depression era. Victor's recording technique was suited to Jones' band. In October 1932, he teamed up with the Three X Sisters in New York who had just departed from CBS radio. They recorded "experimental" songs for RCA Victor in which Jones began to fuse jazz and early swing music. They recorded "Where? (I Wonder Where?)" and "What Would Happen to Me If Something Happened to You." His Victor releases had an almost symphonic sound, often with a strong use of tuba. During his Victor period, he recorded two long playing "Program Transcription" records as part of Victor's unsuccessful 33 1/3 RPM series. He stayed with Victor until July 1934, when he signed with Decca. Jones's recordings during this period rivaled Paul Whiteman, Waring's Pennsylvanians, Leo Reisman and other dance orchestras as examples of the most popular dance music of the era.

Jones' Decca recordings are often unfavorably compared to his Victor recordings, due to Decca's recording techniques, Decca's insisting that Jones re-record many of his Victor recordings, and the apparent smaller size of his orchestra. After he left Decca in 1936, he again retired and his orchestra was taken over by band member Woody Herman. Jones started a new band in 1937–38 and recorded a handful of sessions under the ARC labels: Melotone, Perfect and Banner.

In 1931, Jones performed at the Elitch Gardens Trocadero ballroom.

In the 1940s, Jones resided on his poultry farm in Colorado, which he occasionally left for short tours with pickup bands. He later resided in Los Angeles. He moved to Hollywood, Florida in 1955, and died there of cancer in 1956.

His great-nephew was jazz drummer Rusty Jones.

== Compositions ==
"Swingin' Down the Lane"
"Swingin' Down the Lane", performed by Jones's Orchestra, which was No. 1 for six weeks, and the overall No. 2 single, for 1923

Jones was the leader of one of America's most popular dance bands in the first half of the 20th century, between the two World Wars. His remarkable string of chart-topping compositions between 1922 and 1925, in collaboration with the lyricist Gus Kahn, and later with Charles Newman, included eight No. 1 records, an unequaled body of work for a full-time bandleader. Each of the following selections peaked in the top ten, according to Joel Whitburn's Pop Memories 1890–1954.

The following songs were composed by Jones:

- "Broken Hearted Melody" (1922) – lyrics by Gus Kahn
- "Feeling That Way" (1930)
- "I Can't Believe It's True" (1932) – lyrics by Charles Newman and Ben Bernie
- "I'll Never Have to Dream Again" (1932) – lyrics by Charles Newman
- "I'll See You in My Dreams" – lyrics by Gus Kahn; No. 1 for seven weeks, No. 2 single for 1925
- "I'm Tired of Everything but You" (1925)
- "It Had to Be You" – lyrics by Gus Kahn; No. 1 for five weeks, number four single for 1924
- "My Castle In Spain" (1926)
- "Never Again" (1924) – lyrics by Gus Kahn
- "On the Alamo" – lyrics by Gus Kahn; No. 1 for four weeks, number seven single for 1922
- "The One I Love (Belongs to Somebody Else)" 1924; lyrics, Gus Kahn
- "Some Other Day, Some Other Girl"; lyrics, Gus Kahn; published October 10, 1924 by Milton Weil Music Co., Chicago.
- "Spain" 1930; lyrics, Gus Kahn; number one for two weeks, 1924
- "Swingin' Down the Lane"; lyrics, Gus Kahn – number one for six weeks, number two single for year 1923
- Al Jolson w Isham Jones Orchestra - "The One I Love (Belongs to Somebody Else)" 1924
- "There Is No Greater Love" 1936; lyrics, Marty Symes
- "What's the Use?" 1930; lyrics, Charles Newman
- "Why Can't This Night Go On Forever?" (another theme song) 1932; lyrics, Charles Newman
- "We're in the Army Now" (August 27, 1917) lyrics by Tell Taylor & Ole Olsen
- "You're Just a Dream Come True" (1931) – lyrics by Charles Newman; served as Jones's theme song
- "You've Got Me Crying Again" (1933) – lyrics by Charles Newman

== Other chart-topping recordings ==
This group were hits, but written by other composers:

- "Kismet" Isham Jones Rainbo Orchestra March 17, 1920 Composer Herschel Henlere
- "Make Believe" Isham Jones Orchestra 1920 w. Benny Davis m. Jack Shilkret
- "Wabash Blues" Composer Fred Meinken - number one for six weeks, number two single for year 1921
- "My Honey's Lovin' Arms" 1922 Herman Ruby-Joseph Meyer
- "The World Is Waiting for the Sunrise" 1922 - composed by Raymond Roberts (psued. of Ernest Seitz) and lyrics by Gene Lockhart
- "Who's Sorry Now?" 1923 - composed by Ted Snyder, lyrics by Bert Kalmar and Harry Ruby.
- "Someone Else Walked Right In" 1923 Irving Berlin
- Al Jolson w Isham Jones Orchestra - "Steppin' Out" John S. Howard, Con Conrad
- Al Jolson w Isham Jones Orchestra - "California Here I Come" Al Jolson, Bud DeSylva, Joseph Meyer number one for six weeks, number two single for year 1924
- "Nobody's Sweetheart" February 4, 1924 ©Jack Mills, Inc., New York. Music, Billy Meyers & Elmer Schoebel, lyrics, Gus Kahn & Ernie Erdman
- Al Jolson w Isham Jones Orchestra - "I'm Goin' South" Abner Silver, Harry M. Woods
- "My Best Girl" 1925 Walter Donaldson
- "Riverboat Shuffle 1925 Dick Voynow-Hoagy Carmichael-Irving Mills
- "Sweet Georgia Brown" 1925 Ben Bernie-Maceo Pinkard-Kenneth Casey
- "Remember" Irving Berlin number one for one week, 1925
- "Original Charleston" (1925) Cecil Mack-James P. Johnson
- "At Peace with the World" 1926 Irving Berlin
- "It Made You Happy When You Made Me Cry" 1926 Walter Donaldson
- "I Lost My Heart In Monterey (When I Found You)" 1926 Raymond Egan-Buddy Rose-Richard Whiting
- "Together We Two" Isham Jones Orchestra with the Keller Sisters 1928 Irving Berlin
- "Stardust" (1930) Hoagy Carmichael - one of the bestselling versions. Jones commissioned Victor Young to write a ballad instrumental of the mid-tempo tune and it was this arrangement (with Victor Young's violin solo) which became such a hit. Mitchell Parish wrote lyrics for the song at this time.
- "Lonesome Lover" 1931 Alfred Bryan, James V. Monaco
- "Snuggled on Your Shoulder (Cuddled in Your Arms)" 1932 Joe Young, Carmen Lombardo
- "My Silent Love" 1932 Edward Heyman and Dana Suesse
- "Everyone Says I Love You" 1932 Harry Ruby, Bert Kalmar
- "A Little Street Where Old Friends Meet" 1932 Gus Kahn, Harry Woods
- "It Isn't Fair" 1933 Richard Himber, Frank Warshauer, Sylvester Sprigato
- "Shadows on the Swanee" 1933 Johnny Burke, Harold Spina, Joe Young
- "Over Somebody Else's Shoulder" 1934 Al Sherman, Al Lewis
- "Neighbors" 1934 Charles O'Flynn, James Cavanaugh, Frank Weldon
- "For All We Know" 1934 Sam M. Lewis, J. Fred Coots

== Discography ==
- Happy: The 1920 Rainbo Orchestra Sides (Archeophone, 2014)
- Song of the Blues (1923-1932) (Rivermont Records, 2008)
- Shadows on the Swanee (1932-1934) (Rivermont Records, 2013)

== Honors ==
- 1989 – Big Band and Jazz Hall of Fame, Songwriters Hall of Fame
- 2007 – "It Had to Be You" inducted into the Grammy Hall of Fame

== Bibliography ==
- The Complete Encyclopedia of Popular Music and Jazz 1900–1950. Roger D. Kinkle: Arlington House Publishers, 1974, ISBN 978-0870002298
