= On the Sunny Side of the Street =

1930 song by Jimmy McHugh and Dorothy Fields

Composition
- Published: 1930
- Composer: Jimmy McHugh
- Lyricist: Dorothy Fields

"On the Sunny Side of the Street" is a 1930 song composed by Jimmy McHugh with lyrics by Dorothy Fields. Some authors say Fats Waller was the composer, but that he sold the rights to the song. It was introduced in the Broadway musical Lew Leslie's International Revue, starring Harry Richman and Gertrude Lawrence.

Ted Lewis made the first recording of the song in 1930 (Catalog #2144-D), followed by Harry Richman (Catalog #4747), and both enjoyed hit records with the song.

== Other notable recordings ==
Having become a jazz standard, it has been played by Louis Armstrong, the Nat King Cole Trio, Dave Brubeck, Earl Hines, Benny Goodman, Lionel Hampton, Erroll Garner, Dizzy Gillespie, Art Tatum, James Booker, Count Basie, Nat Gonella, and Lester Young. The Louis Armstrong version was recorded in the key of C major, but it has been recorded in a range of keys; Ted Lewis recorded it in D major and Ella Fitzgerald, in G major.

In 2003, Dave Brubeck received the Library of Congress Living Legend award and performed a concert, including "On the Sunny Side of the Street".

Cover versions date as far back as 1930, when Layton & Johnstone released their version of the song for Columbia. "On the Sunny Side of the Street" was recorded by Billie Holiday, Bing Crosby (January 21, 1946, with Lionel Hampton), Dinah Washington, Ella Fitzgerald, Judy Garland, Doris Day, Brenda Lee (1961), Frankie Laine, Keely Smith, Nat King Cole, Jo Stafford with the Pied Pipers (a No. 17 hit in 1945), Frank Sinatra, Willie Nelson, Jon Batiste, and Rod Stewart. Arguably the most popular arrangement was by Tommy Dorsey and the Sentimentalists, which achieved chart success in 1945, reaching the No. 16 spot.

Recorded by the trumpeter Dizzy Gillespie with tenor saxophonists Sonny Stitt and Sonny Rollins, the composition featured on the 1959 Verve Records album Sonny Side Up, which has been described by AllMusic as "one of the most exciting 'jam session' records in the jazz catalog".

In 1975, the rock band Trapeze covered the song on their self-titled album, Trapeze, and it was also released as a 7″ single, but it did not chart.

== In popular culture ==
The song was featured in the films JFK (1991) and Father of the Bride Part II (1995), in an episode of the sitcom Frasier, and in the comedy drama Northern Exposure (season 4, episode 4), in 1992. It was also used in Cheers (season 3, episode 14), in 1985, where several characters each sing part of the song one after the other, as if by contagion, after walking past each other. The song was also used on the series finale of Perry Mason (2023), as the protagonist begins a short jail term for withholding evidence.

== See also ==
- List of 1930s jazz standards
