= Johnny Mince =

American jazz clarinetist (1912–1994)

- Born: John Muenzenberger; July 8, 1912; Chicago Heights, Illinois, U.S.
- Died: December 23, 1994 (aged 82) Boca Raton, Florida, U.S.
- Genres: Jazz, swing jazz
- Instruments: Clarinet

Johnny Mince (born John Henry Muenzenberger; July 8, 1912 – December 23, 1994) was an American swing jazz clarinetist.

== Career ==
Mince played with Joe Haymes from 1929 to 1934, and recorded with Red Norvo and Glenn Miller in 1935. He then worked with Ray Noble from 1935 to 1937 and Bob Crosby in 1936 before joining Tommy Dorsey in 1937. Mince played with Dorsey through 1941 and was one of the participants in his Clambake Seven recordings.

After an extended stint in the U.S. military (1941–45), Mince worked as a studio musician for several decades. He taught locally in New York City and played in small-time ensembles in the 1950s and 1960s.

In 1974, he returned to play with the Dorsey Orchestra after Tommy's death. Following this he worked with the New Paul Whiteman Orchestra (1976), Yank Lawson, Bob Haggart, and the World's Greatest Jazz Band. As a member of the Great Eight, he toured Europe in 1983. He continued to play at jazz revival festivals until his retirement due to ill health. He recorded as a leader only late in his life, for Monmouth Evergreen in 1979, Jazzology Records in 1980, and Fat Cat Jazz in 1982.

Mince never received much recognition beyond that of his fellow musicians because he did not lead his own band. When unknown, Tommy Dorsey invited Johnny to become Tommy's partner in starting his first band. Mince's father, Otto Muenzenberger, talked him out of it due to risk.

Mince appeared in two movies during his career: The Big Broadcast of 1936 (1935) as part of the Ray Noble Orchestra and in Las Vegas Nights (1941) as a clarinetist in the Tommy Dorsey Orchestra.
