= Sy Oliver =

American trumpeter, composer, singer and bandleader (1910–1988)

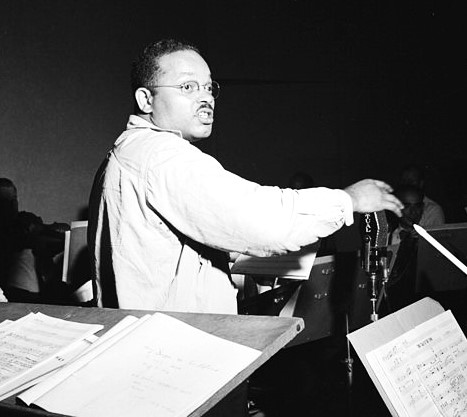
- Sy Oliver from September 1946

Background information
- Born: Melvin James Oliver; December 17, 1910; Battle Creek, Michigan, United States
- Died: May 28, 1988 (aged 77) New York City
- Genre: Jazz
- Occupations: Bandleader, conductor, arranger
- Years active: 1930s–1980s
- Labels: Decca, Columbia, Capitol

Melvin James "Sy" Oliver (December 17, 1910 – May 28, 1988) was an American jazz arranger, trumpeter, composer, singer and bandleader.

== Life ==
Sy Oliver was born in Battle Creek, Michigan, United States. His mother was a piano teacher, and his father was a multi-instrumentalist, who demonstrated saxophones at a time when instrument was seldom played other than by marching bands.

Oliver left home at 17 to play with Zack Whyte and his Chocolate Beau Brummels and later with Alphonse Trent. He sang and played trumpet with these bands, becoming known for his "growling" horn playing. He also began arranging with them.

He continued singing for the next 17 years, making many recordings when he was with Jimmie Lunceford and with his own band. With Lunceford, from 1933 to 1939, he recorded more than two dozen vocals. From 1949 to 1951, he recorded more than a dozen with his band. With Tommy Dorsey, he recorded very few vocals. In 1941, he sang with Jo Stafford, on his own compositions "Yes Indeed" and "Swingin' on Nothin'". He also sang with The Sentimentalists on the 1944 recording of his arrangement of "Chicago".

Oliver arranged and conducted many songs for Ella Fitzgerald from her Decca years. As a composer, one of his most famous songs was "T'ain't What You Do (It's the Way That You Do It)", which he co-wrote with Trummy Young in 1939.

In 1933, Oliver joined Jimmie Lunceford's band as a trumpet player, arranger and songwriter. He contributed many hit arrangements for the band, including "My Blue Heaven" and "Ain't She Sweet", as well as his original composition "For Dancers Only", which eventually became the band's theme song. He was co-arranger with pianist Ed Wilcox; Oliver primarily taking the up-tempo numbers, Wilcox the ballads. Oliver's arrangements "were a dashing parade of innovation that rivaled Ellington's for consistency and originality."

In 1939, when band leader Tommy Dorsey decided he wanted a swing band, his first step was to hire Oliver as an arranger away from Lunceford for $5,000 more a year. Oliver then became one of the first African Americans with a prominent role in a white band when he joined Tommy Dorsey. (Fletcher Henderson, another African American composer/arranger, had joined the Benny Goodman orchestra as the arranger a few years earlier.) He led the transition of the Dorsey band from Dixieland to modern big band. His joining was instrumental in Dorsey luring several jazz players, including Buddy Rich, to his band.

With Dorsey, Oliver continued sharing arranging duties with other arrangers, primarily Axel Stordahl, Oliver doing up-tempo tunes, Stordahl ballads. As James Kaplan put it, "Tommy Dorsey's band got a rocket boost in 1939 when Dorsey stole Lunceford's great arranger Sy Oliver."

His arrangement of "On the Sunny Side of the Street" was a big hit for Dorsey in 1946, as were his compositions "Yes, Indeed!" (a gospel-jazz tune that was later recorded by Ray Charles), "Opus One" (originally titled as "Opus No. 1", but changed to suit the lyric that was added later), "The Minor Is Muggin'", and "Well, Git It".

Oliver left Dorsey after seven years, in 1946, and began working as a freelance arranger and as music director for Decca.

On June 26, 1950, Sy Oliver and his Orchestra recorded the first American version of "C'est si bon" (Henri Betti, André Hornez, Jerry Seelen) and "La Vie en rose" (Louiguy, Édith Piaf, Mack David) for Louis Armstrong. One of his more successful efforts as an arranger was the 1961 Frank Sinatra album, I Remember Tommy, a combined tribute to their former boss.

In 1974, he began a nightly gig with a small band at the Rainbow Room in New York. He continued that gig until 1984, with occasionally time off to make festival or other dates, including at the Roseland Ballroom in New York. He retired in 1984.

Oliver died in New York City at the age of 77.

== Discography ==
- Sway It with Flowers (Brunswick, 1956)
- Sentimental Sy (Dot, 1958)
- 77 Sunset Strip and Other Selections with Frankie Ortega (Jubilee, 1959)
- Back Stage (Dot, 1959)
- Dance Music for People Who Don't Dance Any More (Riverside, 1961)
- What Can I Say? with Val Anthony (L.I.M.S., 1966)
- Yes Indeed (Black and Blue, 1973)
- Annie Laurie (Jazz Legacy, 1978)
- Easy Walker (Jazz Legacy, 1979)

=== As sideman ===
With Jimmie Lunceford

- Lunceford Special (Columbia, 1967)
- Stomp it Off (Decca, 1992)
- Rhythm is Our Business (Decca, 1996)
- Swingsation (GRP, 1998)

With others

- Louis Armstrong, Satchmo Serenades (Decca, 1952)
- Tommy Dorsey, What Is This Thing Called Love? (Victor, 1942)
- Ella Fitzgerald, Ella: The Legendary Decca Recordings (GRP, 1995)
- Frank Sinatra, The Popular Frank Sinatra (Megaforce, 2015)
- Caterina Valente, Plenty Valente (Decca, 1957)
- Peggy Lee, Miss Wonderful (Decca, 1959) — arranger, conductor
- Peggy Lee, Dream Street (Capitol Records, 1957) — arranger, conductor
- Peggy Lee with the Sy Oliver Orchestra, "The Siamese Cat Song" (Lady and the Tramp soundtrack, Walt Disney Records, 1955) — bandleader

== See also ==
- Swing music
