= Tommy Dorsey =

American jazz trombonist and bandleader (1905–1956)

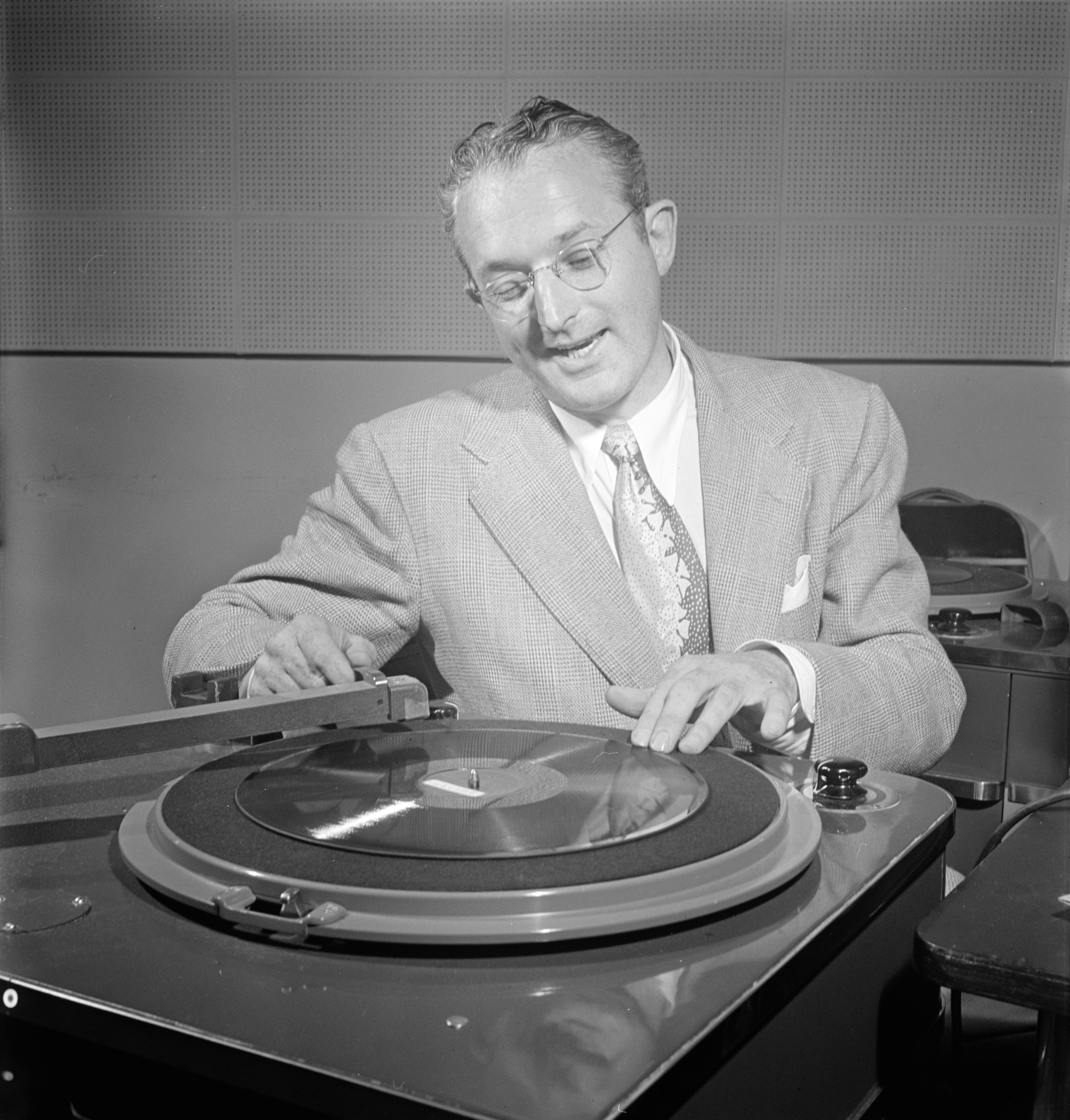
- Dorsey in 1947

Background information
- Born: Thomas Francis Dorsey Jr. November 19, 1905; Shenandoah, Pennsylvania, U.S.
- Died: November 26, 1956 (aged 51) Greenwich, Connecticut, U.S.
- Genres: Big band; swing; jazz
- Occupations: Bandleader; trombonist; conductor
- Instruments: Trombone; trumpet; cornet
- Years active: 1921–1956
- Labels: RCA Victor; Brunswick; Decca; OKeh; Columbia
- Formerly of: The California Ramblers; Jimmy Dorsey; Jean Goldkette; Paul Whiteman; Frank Sinatra; The Pied Pipers; Buddy DeFranco; Buddy Rich; Jo Stafford; Connie Haines; Glenn Miller; The Boswell Sisters; Dick Haymes; Gene Krupa; Sy Oliver; Nelson Riddle

Thomas Francis Dorsey Jr. (November 19, 1905 – November 26, 1956) was an American jazz trombonist, composer, conductor and bandleader of the big band era. He was known as the "Sentimental Gentleman of Swing" because of his smooth-toned trombone playing. His theme song was "I'm Getting Sentimental Over You". His technical skill on the trombone gave him renown among other musicians. He was the younger brother of bandleader Jimmy Dorsey. After Dorsey broke with his brother in the mid-1930s, he led an extremely successful band from the late 1930s into the 1950s. He is best remembered for standards such as "Opus One", "This Love of Mine" (no. 3 in 1941) featuring Frank Sinatra on vocals, "Song of India", "Marie", "On Treasure Island", and his biggest hit single, "I'll Never Smile Again" (no. 1 for 12 weeks in 1940).

== Early life ==
Born in Mahanoy Plane, Pennsylvania, Thomas Francis Dorsey Jr. was the second of four children born to Thomas Francis Dorsey Sr., a bandleader, and Theresa (née Langton) Dorsey. He and Jimmy, his older brother by slightly less than two years, became known as the Dorsey Brothers. The two younger siblings were Mary and Edward, who died young. Tommy Dorsey studied the trumpet with his father but later switched to trombone.

At age 15, Jimmy recommended Tommy to replace Russ Morgan in the Scranton Sirens, a territory band in the 1920s. Tommy and Jimmy worked in bands led by Tal Henry, Rudy Vallee, Vincent Lopez, and Nathaniel Shilkret. In 1923, Dorsey followed Jimmy to Detroit to play in Jean Goldkette's band and returned to New York in 1925 to play with the California Ramblers. In 1927, he joined Paul Whiteman. In 1929, the Dorsey Brothers had their first hit with "Coquette" for OKeh Records.

In 1934, the Dorsey Brothers band signed with Decca, having a hit with "I Believe in Miracles". Glenn Miller was a member of the Dorsey Brothers Orchestra in 1934 and 1935, composing "Annie's Cousin Fanny", "Tomorrow's Another Day", "Harlem Chapel Chimes", and "Dese Dem Dose", all recorded for Decca, for the band. Acrimony between the brothers led to Tommy Dorsey walking out to form his own band in 1935 as the orchestra was having a hit with "Every Little Moment". Dorsey's orchestra was known primarily for its renderings of ballads at dance tempos, frequently with singers such as Jack Leonard and Frank Sinatra.

On August 21, 1949, Tommy, along with trumpeter Charlie Shavers and singer Red Wooten, survived a plane crash uninjured. The aircraft, departing from Windsor, Ontario, Canada, crash-landed in a cornfield after the engine failed shortly after takeoff, according to the pilot.

== Band ==
In 2009, Buddy De Franco recalled recording "Opus One" with Dorsey in the 1940s, commenting on Dorsey's desire to be precise and exact. Expanding on De Franco's opinions about Dorsey, writer Peter Levinson said, "He wanted things to be done his way."

The band was popular almost from the moment it signed with RCA Victor for "On Treasure Island", the first of four hits in 1935. After his 1935 recording, however, Dorsey's manager dropped the "hot jazz" that Dorsey had mixed with his own lyrical style, and instead had Dorsey play pop and vocal tunes. Dorsey kept his Clambake Seven as a Dixieland group that played during performances. Dorsey became the co-host of The Raleigh-Kool Program on the radio with comedian Jack Pearl, then became the host.

By 1939, Dorsey was aware of criticism that his band lacked a jazz feeling. He hired arranger Sy Oliver away from the Jimmie Lunceford band. Sy Oliver's arrangements include "On the Sunny Side of the Street" and "T.D.'s Boogie Woogie"; Oliver also composed two of the new band's signature instrumentals, "Well, Git It" and "Opus One". In 1940, Dorsey hired singer Frank Sinatra from bandleader Harry James. Sinatra made eighty recordings from 1940 to 1942 with the Dorsey band. Two of those eighty songs are "In the Blue of Evening" and "This Love of Mine". Sinatra achieved his first great success as a vocalist in the Dorsey band and claimed he learned breath control from watching Dorsey play trombone. Sy Oliver and Sinatra did a posthumous tribute album to Dorsey on Sinatra's Reprise records. I Remember Tommy appeared in 1961. Dorsey said his trombone style was heavily influenced by Jack Teagarden.

Among Dorsey's staff of arrangers was Axel Stordahl who arranged for Sinatra in his Columbia and Capitol years. Another member of the Dorsey band was trombonist Nelson Riddle, who later had a partnership as one of Sinatra's arrangers and conductors in the 1950s and afterwards. Another noted Dorsey arranger, who, in the 1950s, married and was professionally associated with Dorsey veteran Jo Stafford, was Paul Weston. Bill Finegan, an arranger who left Glenn Miller's civilian band, arranged for the Tommy Dorsey band from 1942 to 1950.

The band featured a number of instrumentalists, singers, and arrangers in the 1930s and '40s, including trumpeters Zeke Zarchy, Bunny Berigan, Ziggy Elman, Doc Severinsen, and Charlie Shavers, pianists Milt Raskin, Jess Stacy, clarinetists Buddy DeFranco, Johnny Mince, and Peanuts Hucko. Others who played with Dorsey were drummers Buddy Rich, Louie Bellson, Dave Tough saxophonist Tommy Reed, and singers Sinatra, Ken Curtis, Jack Leonard, Edythe Wright, Jo Stafford with the Pied Pipers, Dick Haymes, and Connie Haines.

In 1944, Dorsey hired the Sentimentalists, name with which he renamed the already known vocal band The Clark Sisters asking them not to reveal their identity. They replaced the Pied Pipers. Dorsey also performed with singer Connee Boswell He hired ex-bandleader and drummer Gene Krupa after Krupa's arrest for marijuana possession in 1943. In 1942, Artie Shaw broke up his band, and Dorsey hired the Shaw string section. As George T. Simon in Metronome magazine observed at the time: "They're used in the foreground and background (note some of the lovely obbligatos) for vocal effects and for Tommy's trombone."

Dorsey made further business decisions in the music industry. He loaned money to Glenn Miller enabling him to launch his band of 1938, but Dorsey saw the loan as an investment, entitling him to a percentage of Miller's income. When Miller balked at this, the angry Dorsey got even by sponsoring a new band led by Bob Chester, and hiring arrangers who deliberately copied Miller's style and sound. Dorsey branched out in the mid-1940s and owned two music publishing companies, Sun and Embassy. After opening at the Los Angeles ballroom, the Hollywood Palladium on the Palladium's first night, Dorsey's relations with the ballroom soured and he opened a competing ballroom, the Casino Gardens circa 1944. Dorsey also owned for a short time a trade magazine called The Bandstand.

Tommy Dorsey disbanded his own orchestra at the end of 1946. Dorsey might have broken up his own band permanently following World War II, as many big bands did due to the shift in music economics following the war, but Tommy Dorsey's album for RCA Victor, "All Time Hits" placed in the top ten records in February 1947. In addition, "How Are Things in Glocca Morra?", a single recorded by Dorsey, became a top-ten hit in March 1947. As a result, Dorsey was able to re-organize a big band in early 1947. The Dorsey brothers were also reconciling. The biographical film The Fabulous Dorseys (1947) describes sketchy details of how the brothers got their start from-the-bottom-up into the jazz era of one-nighters, the early days of radio in its infancy stages, and the onward march when both brothers ended up with Paul Whiteman before 1935 when The Dorsey Brothers' Orchestra split into two.

In the early 1950s, Tommy Dorsey moved from RCA Victor back to Decca. He was promised $2,000 if he switched to their label. However, he was reported to have collected $2,500 instead.

Jimmy Dorsey broke up his big band in 1953. Tommy invited him to join as a feature attraction. In 1953, the Dorseys focused their attention on television. On December 26, 1953, the brothers appeared with their orchestra on Jackie Gleason's CBS television show, which was preserved on kinescope and later released on home video by Gleason. The brothers took the unit on tour and onto their own television show, Stage Show, from 1954 to 1956. In January 1956, The Dorseys made rock music history introducing Elvis Presley on his national television debut. Presley, then a regional country singer, made six guest appearances on Stage Show promoting his first releases for RCA Victor several months before his more familiar visits to the Milton Berle, Steve Allen, and Ed Sullivan variety programs.

== Personal life ==
Dorsey was married three times. His first wife was 16-year-old Mildred "Toots" Kraft, with whom he eloped in 1922, when he was 17. The couple had two children, Patricia and Thomas F. Dorsey III (nicknamed "Skipper"). In 1935, they moved to "Tall Oaks", a 21-acre (8.5 ha) estate in Bernardsville, New Jersey, that he used for entertaining celebrities. They divorced in 1943 after Dorsey's affair with his former singer Edythe Wright.

Dorsey's second wife was film actress Patricia Dane in 1943, and they were divorced in 1947, but not before he gained headlines for striking actor Jon Hall when Hall embraced her. Finally, Dorsey married Jane Carl New on March 27, 1948, in Atlanta, Georgia. She had been a dancer at the Copacabana nightclub in New York City. Tommy and Jane Dorsey had two children, Catherine Susan and Steve.

=== Death and aftermath ===
Dorsey died on November 26, 1956, at his home in Greenwich, Connecticut, a week after his 51st birthday. He had begun taking sleeping pills regularly at this time, causing him to become heavily sedated; he choked to death in his sleep after eating a large meal. Jimmy Dorsey led his brother's band until his own death from throat cancer the following year. At that point, trombonist Warren Covington became leader of the band with Jane Dorsey's blessing as she owned the rights to her late husband's band and name. Billed as the Tommy Dorsey Orchestra Starring Warren Covington, they reached number seven on the Billboard chart and earned a gold record in the fall of 1958 with the hit single "Tea for Two Cha-Cha". The band was also fronted by Urbie Green after Dorsey's death in 1956.

After Covington left the band, tenor saxophonist Sam Donahue led it from 1961, continuing until 1966. Frank Sinatra Jr. made his professional singing debut with the band at Dallas Memorial Theater in Texas in 1963. Later, trombonist and bandleader Buddy Morrow led the Tommy Dorsey Orchestra from 1977 until his death on September 27, 2010. Jane Dorsey died of natural causes at the age of 79, in Miami, Florida, in 2003. Tommy and Jane Dorsey are interred together in Kensico Cemetery in Valhalla, New York.

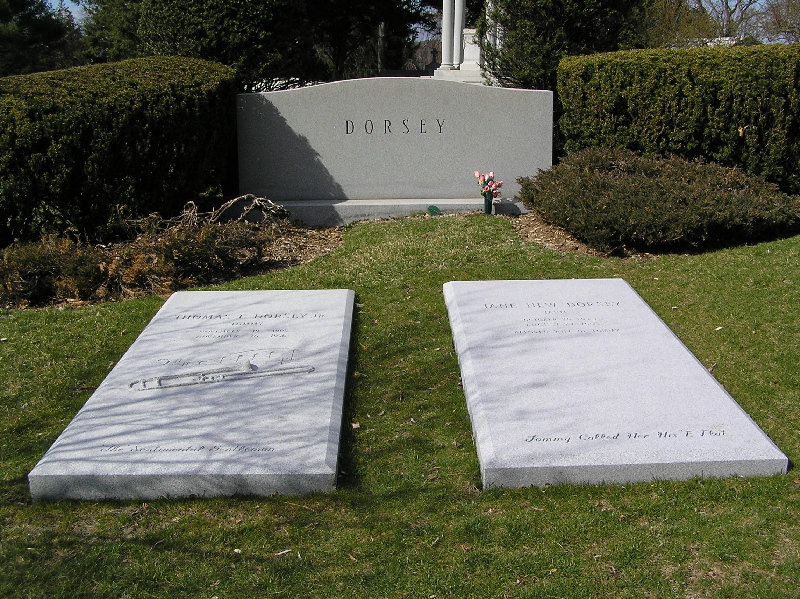
The grave of Tommy and Jane Dorsey in Kensico Cemetery

== Number-one hits ==
Tommy Dorsey had a run of 286 Billboard chart hits. The Dorsey band had seventeen number-one hits with his orchestra in the 1930s and 1940s including: "On Treasure Island", "The Music Goes 'Round and Around", "You", "Marie" (written by Irving Berlin), "Satan Takes a Holiday", "The Big Apple", "Once in a While", "The Dipsy Doodle", "Our Love", "All the Things You Are", "Indian Summer", and "Dolores". He had two more number one hits in 1935 when he was a member of the Dorsey Brothers Orchestra: "Lullaby of Broadway" (written by Harry Warren), number one for two weeks, and "Chasing Shadows", number one for three weeks. His biggest hit was "I'll Never Smile Again", featuring Frank Sinatra on vocals, which was number one for twelve weeks on the Billboard pop singles chart in 1940. "RCA Victor ... scored with 'There Are Such Things', which had a Sinatra vocal; it hit number one in January 1943, as did 'In the Blue of the Evening', another Dorsey record featuring Sinatra, in August, while a third Dorsey/Sinatra release, 'It's Always You,' hit the Top Five later in the year, and a fourth, 'I'll Be Seeing You', reached the Top Ten in 1944." The website "Tommy Dorsey A Songwriter's Friend" says, "the orchestra had over 200 top twenty recordings including the No. 1 hits 'The Music Goes Round and Round' (1935), 'Alone' (1936) 'You' (1936), 'Marie' (1937), 'Satan Takes a Holiday' (1937), 'The Big Apple' (1937), 'Once in a While' (1937), 'The Dipsy Doodle' (1937), 'Music, Maestro, Please' (1938), 'Our Love' (1939), 'Indian Summer' (1939), 'All the Things You Are' (1939), 'I'll Never Smile Again' (1940), 'Dolores' (1941), 'There are Such Things' (1942), and 'In the Blue of the Evening' (1943)."

== Songs written by Tommy Dorsey ==
- 1929: "You Can't Cheat a Cheater" with Phil Napoleon and Frank Signorelli
- 1932: "Three Moods"; NB. Dorsey recorded two takes of this song for OKeh Records, on August 6, 1932, in New York City.
- 1937: "The Morning After"
- 1938: "Chris and His Gang" with Fletcher and Horace Henderson
- 1938: Tommy Dorsey wrote the song "Peckin' With Penguins" for a 1938 Frank Tashlin-directed Porky Pig cartoon, "Porky's Spring Planting" for the studio Warner Bros.
- 1939: "To You"
- 1939: "This Is No Dream"
- 1939: "You Taught Me to Love Again"
- 1939: "In the Middle of a Dream"
- 1939: "Night in Sudan"
- 1939: "Dark Laughter" with Juan Tizol
- 1945: "Fluid Jive"
- 1946: "Nip and Tuck"
- 1947: "Trombonology"

Written with Fred Norman

- "Bunch of Beats"
- "Mid Riff"
- "Candied Yams"

== Awards and honors ==
In 1982, the 1940 Victor recording "I'll Never Smile Again" was the first of a trio of Tommy Dorsey recordings to be inducted into the Grammy Hall of Fame. His theme song, "I'm Getting Sentimental Over You" was inducted in 1998, along with his recording of "Marie" written by Irving Berlin in 1928. In 1996, the U.S. Postal Service issued a Tommy Dorsey and Jimmy Dorsey commemorative postage stamp.

Tommy Dorsey was posthumously inducted into the Grammy Hall of Fame, which is a special Grammy award established in 1973 to honor recordings that are at least 25 years old and that have "qualitative or historical significance".

Tommy Dorsey: Grammy Hall of Fame Awards
Year recorded	Title	Genre	Label	Year inducted	Notes
1940	"I'll Never Smile Again"	Jazz (single)	Victor	1982	
1936	"I'm Getting Sentimental Over You"	Jazz (single)	Victor	1998	
1937	"Marie"	Jazz (single)	Victor	1998	

== Movie appearances ==
Tommy Dorsey appeared in the following movies and film shorts:

- Universal Name Band Musical 7301: Tommy Dorsey and His Orchestra, 1951, film short
- Disc Jockey, 1951
- A Song Is Born, 1948
- The Fabulous Dorseys, 1947
- Thrill of a Romance, 1945
- Broadway Rhythm, 1944
- Girl Crazy, 1943
- Swing Fever, 1943
- I Dood It, 1943
- Du Berry Was a Lady, 1943
- Presenting Lily Mars, 1943
- Ship Ahoy, 1942
- Birth of the Blues, 1941
- Las Vegas Nights, 1941
- A Night in a Dormitory, 1930, film short

== Discography ==
- Up Swing (RCA Victor, 1944)
- Getting Sentimental (RCA Victor, 1945, No. 4 US)
- Showboat (RCA Victor, 1946, No. 2 US)
- All-Time Hits (RCA Victor, 1947, No. 2 US)
- Tommy Dorsey Plays Tchaikovsky Melodies for Dancing (RCA Victor, 1947)
- Clambake Seven (RCA Victor, 1948, No. 3 US)
- Tommy Dorsey (RCA Victor, 1949)
- Tommy Dorsey Plays Cole Porter for Dancing (RCA Victor, 1950, No. 7 US)
- Tommy Dorsey's Dixieland for Dancing (RCA Victor, 1950)
- The Later Tommy Dorsey Volume 2 (Ajaz, 1950)
- Ecstasy (Decca, 1951)
- Tommy and Jimmy Dorsey with the California Ramblers (Riverside, 1955)
- That Sentimental Gentleman (RCA Victor, 1957)
- The Golden Age of the Dance Bands (Somerset, 1957)
- The Dorsey Touch (Riviera, 1959)
- Tribute to Tommy Dorsey (Broadway, 1959)
- The One And Only Tommy Dorsey (RCA Camden, 1961)
- Tommy Dorsey's Dance Party (Ace of Hearts, 1961)
- Dedicated to You (RCA Camden, 1964)
- A Man and His Trombone (Colpix, 1966)
- Here are Tommy and Jimmy Dorsey at Their Rare of All Rarest Performance Vol. 1 (Kings of Jazz, 1975)
- Tommy Dorsey On Radio/Eddie Condon's Jazz Concert (Radiola, 1975)
- Tommy Dorsey (1937 – 1941) (AMIGA, 1976)
- One Night Stand (Sandy Hook, 1976)
- Frank Sinatra & Tommy Dorsey (Durium, 1976)
- The Dorsey/Sinatra Sessions (RCA, 1982)
- The Tommy Dorsey/Frank Sinatra Radio Years and the Historic Stordahl Session (RCA, 1983)
- The End of the Big Band Era! (Sandy Hook, 1983)
- Ship Ahoy/Las Vegas Nights (Hollywood Soundstage, 1983)
- A Tribute (Star Line Productions, 1987)
- All-Time Greatest Dorsey/Sinatra Hits, Vol. 1-4 (RCA, 1988)
- Plays Sweet & Hot (Tax, 1989)
- Tommy Dorsey and His Orchestra/And His Clambake Seven (LaserLight, 1990)
- Tea for Two (Jazz Collection, 1990)
- Yes Indeed! (Bluebird/RCA, 1990)
- Music Goes Round and Round (Bluebird/RCA, 1991)
- Stop, Look and Listen (ASV/Living Era, 1994)
- Kings of Trombone (Hallmark, 1995)
- Dorsey-itis (Drive Archive, 1996)
- Saturday Afternoon at the Meadowbrook 1940 (Jazz Band, 2000)
- This Is Tommy Dorsey & His Orchestra, Vol. 1 (Collectables, 2001)
- The Early Jazz Sides 1932–1937 (Jazz Legends, 2004)
- It's D'Lovely 1947–1950 (Hep, 2004)

== Filmography ==
- Segar Ellis and His Embassy Club Orchestra (1929)
- Alice Bolden and Her Orchestra (1929)

Tommy Dorsey and his Orchestra appear in the following films for Paramount, MGM, Samuel Goldwyn, Allied Artists, and United Artists:

- Las Vegas Nights (1941)
- Ship Ahoy (1942)
- Presenting Lily Mars(1943)
- Girl Crazy (1943)
- Du Barry Was a Lady (1943)
- Broadway Rhythm (1944)
- Thrill of a Romance (1945)
- The Great Morgan (1946)
- The Fabulous Dorseys (1947)
- A Song Is Born (1948)
- Disk Jockey (1951)

== See also ==
- A Jam Session at Victor (1937 jam session in which Dorsey participated)
