= Carmen McRae discography =

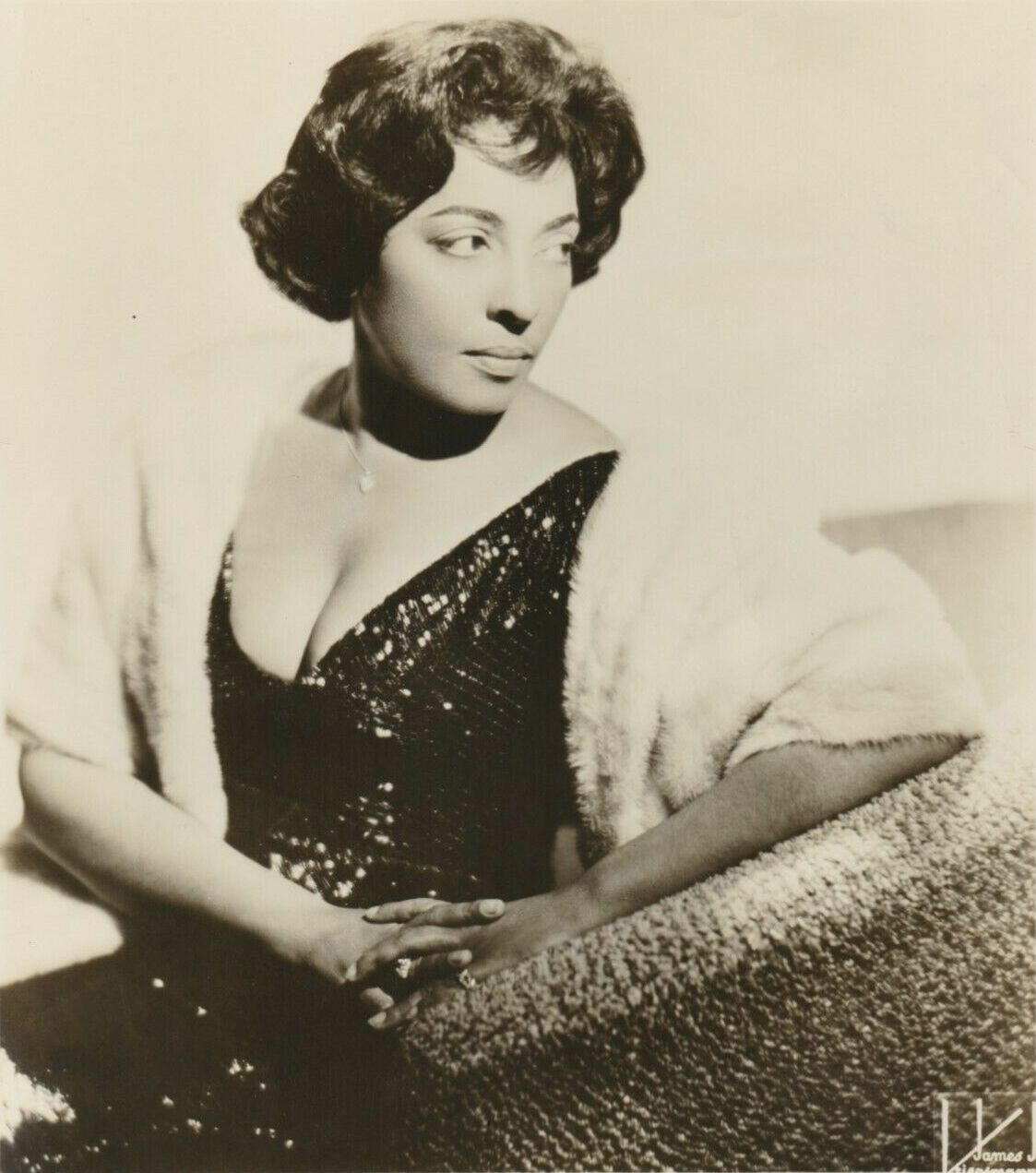
- Carmen McRae in a press photo dated to 1960
- Studio albums: 39
- Live albums: 26
- Compilation albums: 25

The discography of American singer and pianist Carmen McRae includes twenty-nine studio albums, twenty-six live albums and twenty-five compilations.

== Albums ==
=== Studio albums ===
Title	Details	Peak chart positions		
Title	Details	US Pop	US Jazz	US R&B
A Foggy Day with Carmen McRae (with Ivie Anderson)	Released: 1953; Label: Stardust	—	—	—
Carmen McRae	Released: 1955; Label: Bethlehem Records	—	—	—
By Special Request	Released: 1955; Label: Decca Records	—	—	—
Torchy!	Released: 1956; Label: Decca Records	—	—	—
Blue Moon	Released: 1956; Label: Decca Records	—	—	—
Boy Meets Girl (with Sammy Davis Jr.)	Released: 1957; Label: Decca Records	—	—	—
After Glow	Released: 1957; Label: Decca Records	—	—	—
Mad About the Man	Released: 1958; Label: Decca Records	—	—	—
Carmen for Cool Ones	Released: 1958; Label: Decca Records	—	—	—
Birds of a Feather	Released: 1958; Label: Decca Records	—	—	—
Porgy and Bess (with Sammy Davis Jr.)	Released: 1959; Label: Decca Records	—	—	—
Book of Ballads	Released: 1959; Label: Kapp Records	—	—	—
When You're Away	Released: 1959; Label: Kapp Records	—	—	—
Something to Swing About	Released: 1960; Label: Kapp Records	—	—	—
Tonight Only! (with Dave Brubeck)	Released: 1961; Label: Columbia Records	—	—	—
Carmen McRae Sings Lover Man and Other Billie Holiday Classics	Released: 1962; Label: Columbia Records	—	—	—
Something Wonderful	Released: 1963; Label: Columbia Records	—	—	—
Bittersweet	Released: 1964; Label: Focus Records	—	—	—
Second to None	Released: November 1964; Label: Mainstream Records	—	—	—
Haven't We Met?	Released: March 1965; Label: Mainstream Records	—	—	—
Alfie	Released: August 1966; Label: Mainstream Records	150	—	—
For Once in My Life	Released: July 1967; Label: Atlantic Records	—	—	—
Portrait of Carmen	Released: January 1968; Label: Atlantic Records	—	—	—
The Sound of Silence	Released: 1968; Label: Atlantic Records	—	17	—
Just a Little Lovin'	Released: 1970; Label: Atlantic Records	—	—	—
Carmen	Released: 1972; Label: Temponic Records	—	—	—
It Takes a Whole Lot of Human Feeling	Released: 1973; Label: Groove Merchant	—	—	—
Ms. Jazz	Released: 1974; Label: Groove Merchant	—	—	—
I Am Music	Released: 1975; Label: Blue Note Records	—	22	56
November Girl	Released: 1975 (UK); Label: Black Lion Records	—	—	—
Can't Hide Love	Released: 1976; Label: Blue Note Records	—	—	—
I'm Coming Home Again	Released: 1980; Label: Buddah Records	—	29	—
Two for the Road (with George Shearing)	Released: 1980; Label: Concord Records	—	45	—
Heat Wave (with Cal Tjader)	Released: 1982; Label: Concord Jazz	—	25	—
You're Lookin' at Me (A Collection of Nat King Cole Songs)	Released: 1984; Label: Concord Records	—	—	—
Any Old Time	Released: 1986; Label: Denon Records	—	—	—
Carmen Sings Monk	Released: 1990; Label: Novus Records	—	5	—
Sarah: Dedicated to You	Released: 1991; Label: Novus Records	—	3	—
Dream of Life	Released: 29 September 1998; Label: Qwest Records	—	—	—
"—" denotes items which did not chart in that country.

=== Live albums ===
Title	Details	Peak chart positions
Title	Details	US Jazz
Carmen McRae in London	Released: October 1961; Label: Ember Records	—
Take Five Live (with Dave Brubeck)	Released: 1962; Label: Columbia Records	—
Live at Sugar Hill	Released: 1963; Label: Time Records	—
Woman Talk	Released: 1966; Label: Mainstream Records	—
"Live" & Wailing	Released: 1968; Label: Mainstream Records	—
Carmen McRae	Released: 1971; Label: Mainstream Records	—
The Great American Songbook	Released: 1972; Label: Atlantic Records	—
Alive!	Released: 1973; Label: Mainstream Records	—
As Time Goes By: Live at the Dug	Released: May 10, 1974 (Japan); Label: Victor	—
Live and Doin' It	Released: 1974; Label: Mainstream Records	—
Live at Century Plaza	Released: 1975 (Japan); Label: Atlantic Records	—
At the Great American Music Hall	Released: 1977; Label: Blue Note Records	—
Ronnie Scott's Presents Carmen McRae 'Live'	Released: 1977 (UK); Label: Pye Records	—
Jazz Gala 79	Released: 1979 (France); Label: America Records	—
Recorded Live at Bubba's	Released: 1981; Label: Who's Who in Jazz	—
The Carmen McRae – Betty Carter Duets (with Betty Carter)	Released: 1987; Label: American Music Hall Records	15
Fine and Mellow: Live at Birdland West	Released: 1988; Label: Concord Records	—
New York State of Mind	Released: May 21, 1992 (Japan); Label: Victor	—
Everything Happens to Me	Released: 1994; Label: Jazz Hour	—
Carmen McRae & Her Trio Live	Released: 1995; Label: Jazz Door	—
For Lady Day	Released: 1995; Label: Novus Records	17
Jazz Masters	Released: 1997; Label: e.f.s.a. collection	—
Live in Tokyo	Released: 1999; Label: Absord Music Japan	—
Live at Umbria Jazz	Released: 2001; Label: EGEA	—
At Ratso's	Released: 2002; Label: Hitchcock Media Records	—
Marian McPartland's Piano Jazz with Guest Carmen McRae	Released: 2002; Label: The Jazz Alliance	—
"—" denotes items which did not chart in that country.

=== Compilation albums ===
Title	Details
Bethlehem's Girl Friends (with Chris Connor and Julie London)	Released: 1956; Label: Bethlehem Records
My Foolish Heart	Released: 1958; Label: Vocalion
Nina Simone and Her Friends an Intimate Variety of Vocal Charm (with Nina Simone and Chris Connor)	Released: 1959; Label: Bethlehem Records
This Is Carmen McRae	Released: 1967; Label: Kapp Records
Carmen's Gold	Released: 1971; Label: Mainstream Records
The Best of Carmen McRae	Released: 1971 (Japan); Label: Mainstream Records
I Want You	Released: 1972; Label: Mainstream Records
Here to Stay	Released: 1973; Label: MCA Coral
Velvet Soul	Released: 1975; Label: Groove Merchant
The Greatest of Carmen McRae	Released: 1977; Label: MCA Records
The Ultimate Carmen McRae	Released: 1991; Label: Mainstream Records
Black Magic 'Live'	Released: 1992; Label: Jazz Hour
Here to Stay	Released: 1992; Label: Decca Jazz
Song Time	Released: 1993; Label: Hindsight Jazz
Carmen McRae Sings Great American Songwriters	Released: 1993; Label: GRP, MCA Records
The Best of Carmen McRae	Released: 1995; Label: Blue Note Records
I'll Be Seeing You	Released: June 20, 1995; Label: GRP, MCA Records
Priceless Jazz Collection	Released: 1998; Label: GRP
Ballad Essentials	Released: October 26, 1999; Label: Concord Jazz
Carmen McRae's Finest Hour	Released: September 12, 2000; Label: Verve Records
Ralph Gleason's Jazz Casual: Mel Tormé & Carmen McRae (with Mel Tormé)	Released: 2001; Label: Koch Jazz
Diva	Released: 20 мая 2003; Label: Verve Records
20th Century Masters – The Millennium Collection: The Best of Carmen McRae	Released: 2004; Label: Verve Records
Carmen McRae for Lovers	Released: 2006; Label: Verve Records
Standards	Released: 2010; Label: Verve Records

== Bibliography ==
- Friedwald, Will (2010). "Carmen McRae". A Biographical Guide to the Great Jazz and Pop Singers. Knopf Doubleday Publishing Group. pp. 320–324. ISBN 9780307379894.
- Gourse, Leslie (2001). Carmen McRae: Miss Jazz. New York: Billboard Books. ISBN 978-0-8230-7904-9.
