= Ronnie Scott's Presents Carmen McRae 'Live' =

Live album by Carmen McRae
- Released: 1977
- Recorded: July 8–9, 1977
- Venues: Ronnie Scott's Jazz Club, Soho, London
- Genre: Vocal jazz
- Length: 37:41
- Label: Pye
- Producer: Peter King

Carmen McRae chronology
At the Great American Music Hall (1977)	Ronnie Scott's Presents Carmen McRae 'Live' (1977)	Jazz Gala 79 (1979)

Ronnie Scott's Presents Carmen McRae 'Live' is a live album by American singer Carmen McRae, recorded during the singer's July concerts at Ronnie Scott's Jazz Club in 1977. The recording also featured pianist Marshall Otwell, bassist John Gianelli and drummer Joey Baron. The album was released the same year in the United Kingdom by Pye Records.

== Overview ==
MacRae first performed at Ronnie Scott's in 1975, but with British musicians. According to her, she felt uncomfortable without her trio. In addition, she admitted that British musicians are more clamped down compared to Americans. Also she caught a cold during two weeks of performances, and the applause from the audience seemed to her more respectful than sincere. In 1977, the singer returned to the club stage with her band and successfully held a series of concerts.

== Critical reception ==
Professional ratings
Review scores
Source	Rating
The Encyclopedia of Popular Music	3/5 stars
The Rolling Stone Jazz & Blues Album Guide	3.5/5 stars

Mike Hennessey, music critic and editor of Jazz Journal International, noted that MacRae was in great shape, singing with that effortless grace and authority that stems from years of hard work, and talking between songs with that easy, outrageous frankness that characterizes a born performer who feels at home in an intimate club the atmosphere.

== Track listing ==
1. "Introduction By Ronnie Scott"
2. "If You Could See Me Now" (Tadd Dameron, Carl Sigman) – 3:18
3. "Sometimes I'm Happy" (Irving Caesar, Vincent Youmans) – 2:45
4. "I'm Gonna Lock Away My Heart and Throw Away the Key" (Jim Eaton, Terry Shand) – 3:10
5. "Baby Won't You Please Come Home" (Charles Warfield, Clarence Williams) – 3:52
6. "Poor Butterfly" (John Golden, Raymond Hubbell) – 3:45
7. "Evergreen" (Barbra Streisand, Paul Williams) – 2:55
8. "Sunday" (Chester Conn, Benny Krueger, Ned Miller, Jule Styne) – 5:23
9. "Weaver of Dreams" (Jack Elliott, Victor Young) – 3:07
10. "Get Out of Town" (Cole Porter) – 2:26
11. "With One More Look at You" (Kenny Ascher, Paul Williams) – 4:42
12. "Miss Brown" (Richard A. Whiting, Ralph Rainger, Leo Robin) – 2:18

== Personnel ==
- Carmen McRae – vocals
- John Gianelli – bass
- Joey Baron – drums
- Howard Kilgour – engineer
- Marshall Otwell – piano
- Peter King – producer
- Howard Kilgour – recording, mixing
