= Live at Sugar Hill (Carmen McRae album) =

Live album by Carmen McRae
- Released: October 1963
- Recorded: September 27 and October 13, 1962
- Venue: Sugar Hill, San Francisco
- Genre: Vocal jazz
- Length: 34:56
- Label: Time Records
- Producer: Bob Shad

Carmen McRae chronology
Something Wonderful (1963)	Live at Sugar Hill (1963)	Bittersweet (1964)

Live at Sugar Hill is a live album by American singer Carmen McRae, recorded in the fall of 1962 during a series of concerts at the Sugar Hill Nightclub in San Francisco with the participation of pianist Norman Simmons, bassist Victor Sproles and drummer Stu Martin. The album was released in 1963 on the Time Records label, and in 1972 it was reissued by Mainstream Records under the title In Person and with a new cover.

== Critical reception ==
Professional ratings
Review scores
Source	Rating
AllMusic	2/5 stars 3/5 stars
Billboard	4/4 stars

A review by Billboard magazine said that Ms. McRae sings, demonstrating not only her impeccable and impressive style, but also a lot of warmth, humor and something else that makes the performance inspiring.

== Track listing ==
1. "Sunday" (Chester Conn, Benny Krueger, Ned Miller, Jule Styne) – 3:18
2. "What Kind of Fool Am I" (Leslie Bricusse, Anthony Newley) – 3:55
3. "A Foggy Day" (George Gershwin, Ira Gershwin) – 1:07
4. "I Left My Heart in San Francisco" (George Cory, Douglass Cross) – 6:03
5. "I Didn't Know What Time It Was" (Lorenz Hart, Richard Rodgers) – 4:12
6. "Let There Be Love" (Ian Grant) – 3:28
7. "This Is All I Ask" (Gordon Jenkins) – 4:03
8. "Thou Swell" (Lorenz Hart, Richard Rodgers) – 1:04
9. "It Never Entered My Mind" (Lorenz Hart, Richard Rodgers) – 4:28
10. "Make Someone Happy" (Betty Comden, Adolph Green, Jule Styne) – 3:18

== Personnel ==
- Carmen McRae – vocals
- Victor Sproles – bass
- Stu Martin – drums
- Norman Simmons – piano
- Wally Hader – sound engineer
