= Dream of Life (Carmen McRae album) =

Studio album by Carmen McRae
- Released: September 29, 1998
- Recorded: June 21–24, 1989
- Studio: WDR Studios, Cologne
- Genre: Vocal jazz
- Length: 45:30
- Label: Qwest

Carmen McRae chronology
The Best of Carmen McRae (1995)	Dream of Life (1998)	Ballad Essentials (1999)

Dream of Life is a studio album by American singer Carmen McRae, released in 1998 by Qwest Records after her death. This was one of MacRae's last sessions, made in June 1989 at the WDR Studio in Cologne, Germany, with the participation of the WDR Big Band. It was named after a song written by McRae at the age of seventeen and recorded by her friend and mentor Billie Holiday in 1937.

For recording the album, McRae received a nomination for the NAACP Image Awards as the best jazz artist.

== Critical reception ==
Professional ratings
Review scores
Source	Rating
AllMusic	4/5 stars
The Encyclopedia of Popular Music	4/5 stars

Scott Yanow of AllMusic wrote that McRae is in fine form on a wide-ranging program, and also that it is a rare opportunity to hear her accompanied by such a large orchestra.

== Track listing ==
1. "In Walked Bud" (Jon Hendricks, Thelonious Monk) – 2:44
2. "Sunday" (Chester Conn, Benny Krueger, Ned Miller, Jule Styne) – 7:03
3. "For All We Know" (J. Fred Coots, Sam M. Lewis) – 3:25
4. "I Have the Feeling I've Been Here Before" (Alan Bergman, Marilyn Bergman, Roger Kellaway) – 5:18
5. "I Didn't Know What Time It Was" (Lorenz Hart, Richard Rodgers) – 3:51
6. "A Song for You" (Leon Russell) – 3:26
7. "Miss Brown to You" (Ralph Rainger, Leo Robin, Richard A. Whiting) – 4:02
8. "Dream of Life" (Luther Henderson, Carmen McRae) – 5:04
9. "What Can I Say After I Say I'm Sorry?" (Walter Donaldson, Abe Lyman) – 4:08
10. "If the Moon Turns Green" (Paul Coates, Bernie Hanighen) – 3:30
11. "You're a Weaver of Dreams" (Jack Elliott, Victor Young) – 2:59

== Personnel ==
- Carmen McRae – vocals
- John Clayton – arrangement, conductor (1–10)
- WDR Big Band – band
- John Von Ohlen – drums
- Eric Gunnison – piano
- Harald Rosenstein, Heiner Wiberny, Olivier Peters, Rolf Römer – saxophone
- Bernt Laukamp, Dave Horler, Henning Berg, Roy Deuvall – trombone
- Klaus Osterloh, Rick Kiefer – trumpet
