= Carmen's Gold =

Compilation album by Carmen McRae
- Released: August 1971
- Recorded: 1964–1966
- Genre: Vocal jazz
- Length: 36:00
- Label: Mainstream
- Producer: Bob Shad

Carmen McRae chronology
Carmen McRae (1971)	Carmen's Gold (1971)	Carmen (1972)

Carmen's Gold is a compilation album by American singer Carmen McRae, released in 1971. The album features songs from the singer's period of work with the Mainstream Records label in the 1960s, mainly from the albums Second to None (1964), Haven't We Met? (1965) and Alfie (1966).

In 1994, it was reissued by the Jazz Heritage label with a new cover and two bonus tracks.

== Critical reception ==
Professional ratings
Review scores
Source	Rating
AllMusic	4/5 stars
The Rolling Stone Jazz Record Guide	3/5 stars

Billboard magazine wrote that this is "a collection of some of the most appreciate material in the stylist's repertoire and is the most welcome in one package." A reviewer of Record Mirror quoted one of the critics who once said that Carmen McRae is an excellent interpreter and one of the best jazz singers, and agreed, stating that this praise is confirmed, at least in part, by this collection.

== Track listing ==
1. "Alfie" (Burt Bacharach, Hal David) — 2:44
2. "Who Can I Turn To?" (Leslie Bricusse, Anthony Newley) — 3:09
3. "The Music That Makes Me Dance" (The Music That Makes Me Dance, Jule Styne) — 3:40
4. "Gentlemen Friend" (Arnold Horwitt, Richard Lewine) — 2:20
5. "It Shouldn't Happen to a Dream" (Don George, Duke Ellington, Johnny Hodges) — 2:58
6. "Love Is a Night-Time Thing" (Bob Haymes) — 2:37
7. "Because You're Mine" (Nicholas Brodszky, Sammy Cahn) — 2:32
8. "Cloudy Morning" (Marvin Fisher, Joseph McCarthy) — 2:59
9. "Limehouse Blues" (Douglas Furber, Phillip Braham) — 3:01
10. "Blame It on My Youth" (Edward Heyman, Oscar Levant) — 3:28

1994 reissue bonus tracks

1. "Life Is Just a Bowl of Cherries" (Lew Brown, Ray Henderson) — 2:50
2. "Where Did It Go (Manhã de Carnaval) (Theme from Black Orpheus)" (Ruth Batchelor, Luiz Bonfá) — 2:32
