= The Greatest of Carmen McRae =

Compilation album by Carmen McRae
- Released: 1977
- Recorded: 1955–1959
- Genre: Vocal jazz
- Label: MCA
- Compiler: Leonard Feather

Carmen McRae chronology
Can't Hide Love (1976)	The Greatest of Carmen McRae (1977)	At the Great American Music Hall (1977)

The Greatest of Carmen McRae is a compilation album by American singer Carmen McRae, released in 1977 by MCA Records. This album is a compilation of Carmen's songs from her works previously released on Decca and Kapp Records. All tracks were selected by jazz musician and journalist Leonard Feather and approved by MacRae.

== Critical reception ==
Professional ratings
Review scores
Source	Rating
AllMusic	4.5/5 stars
The Encyclopedia of Popular Music	3/5 stars
The Rolling Stone Jazz Record Guide	3/5 stars

Scott Yanow of AllMusic stated that it is "an excellent sampler that features McRae in 19 different settings, this was a pretty definitive set before the CD era." Among the most striking songs he noted: "Good Morning Heartache", "Something to Live For", "Yardbird Suite", "Isn't It Romantic", "I Was Doing All Right", "Perdido" and "Baltimore Oriole."

Cash Box magazine wrote the following: "The title of this album may be open to question since one would need much more than these 32 tracks to constitute the greatest of Carmen McRae, but much of this would certainly warrant inclusion. Ms. McRae sings excellent material with a natural feel for proper tempo and is an excellent interpreter of lyrics as well. Varied accompaniment, with everything from big band to solo guitar represented. Fans of the best in jazz oriented popular singing could hardly do better than this."

== Track listing ==
Side A

1. "Love Is a Simple Thing" – 2:04
2. "Yesterdays" – 2:33
3. "Good Morning, Heartache" – 3:15
4. "I'm Putting All My Eggs in One Basket" – 2:22
5. "I Remember Clifford" – 2:56
6. "Lush Life" – 3:33
7. "Something to Live For" – 3:10
8. "Yardbird Suite" – 1:55

Side B

1. "Falling in Love with Love" – 2:10
2. "The Night We Called It a Day" – 4:23
3. "Guess Who I Saw Today" – 3:32
4. "Summertime" – 2:55
5. "Suppertime" – 2:57
6. "The Little Things that Mean So Much" – 3:10
7. "Exactly Like You" – 2:07
8. "Perdido (Lost)" – 2:15

Side C

1. "Nice Work If You Can Get It" – 2:27
2. "Bob White (Whatcha Gonna Swing Tonight)" – 2:53
3. "Baltimore Oriole" – 3:49
4. "Skylark" – 2:59
5. "Love Is Here to Stay" – 2:37
6. "He Was Too Good to Me" – 2:40
7. "All This Could Lead to Love" – 3:08
8. "Nowhere" – 2:39

Side D

1. "All the Things You Are" – 2:23
2. "Dream of Life" – 3:59
3. "You Took Advantage of Me" – 2:34
4. "Isn't It Romantic" – 2:58
5. "I Was Doing All Right" – 2:46
6. "Last Night When We Were Young" – 2:35
7. "If You'd Stay the Way I Dream About You" – 2:44
8. "His Eye Is on the Sparrow" – 3:20
