= Alive! (Carmen McRae album) =

Live album / compilation by Carmen McRae
- Released: 1973 (Double LP); 1994 (CD)
- Recorded: December 1965
- Studio: The Village Gate, New York City
- Genre: Vocal jazz
- Length: 1:15:21
- Label: Mainstream Records MRL 800, Columbia/Legacy; JK 57887 (US), COL 477738 2 (Europe)
- Producer: Bob Shad (original), Lawrence Cohn (CD reissue)

Alive! is a 1973 live album by the American jazz singer Carmen McRae recorded at The Village Gate in New York City in 1965. This is a compilation album of two albums already released on Mainstream Records, Woman Talk (1966), and "Live" and Wailing (1968), with Woman Talk covering the first twelve songs, the latter the last nine. The double LP was digitally mastered and released on CD by Sony Music in 1994 on their Columbia/Legacy labels in the "Columbia Jazz Masterpieces" series.

== Reception ==
Professional ratings
Review scores
Source	Rating
Allmusic	3/5 stars

Writing for AllMusic, Scott Yanow stated that "The flute and bongos make the music seem a bit dated, as does the inclusion of some forgettable show tunes from the era...McRae is in prime voice and sounds best on some Billie Holiday-associated tunes, but the set is mostly for her fans rather than general collectors."

== Track listing ==
1. "Sometimes I'm Happy" (Irving Caesar, Clifford Grey, Vincent Youmans) – 3:27
2. "Don't Explain" (Billie Holiday, Arthur Herzog, Jr.) – 4:15
3. "Woman Talk" (Johannes Brahms, Tony Scott) – 4:51
4. "Kick Off Your Shoes" (Cy Coleman, Murray Grand) – 2:16
5. "The Shadow of Your Smile" (Johnny Mandel, Paul Francis Webster) – 3:53
6. "The Sweetest Sounds" (Richard Rodgers) – 2:03
7. "Where Would You Be Without Me?" (Leslie Bricusse, Anthony Newley) – 2:34
8. "Feeling Good" (Bricusse, Newley) – 4:33
9. "Run Run Run" (L.E. Freeman) – 2:30
10. "No More" (Tutti Camarata, Bob Russell) – 3:19
11. "Look at That Face" (Bricusse, Newley) – 5:02
12. "I Wish I Were in Love Again" (Lorenz Hart, Rodgers) – 1:33
13. "You Better Go Now" (Irvin Graham, Bickley Reichner) – 2:51
14. "Love for Sale" (Cole Porter) – 7:17
15. "If I Could Be With You (One Hour Tonight)" (Henry Creamer, James P. Johnson) – 4:31
16. "Miss Brown to You" (Ralph Rainger, Leo Robin, Richard A. Whiting) – 2:58
17. "Perdido" (Ervin Drake, Hans Lengsfelder, Juan Tizol) – 2:59
18. "Too Close for Comfort" (Martyn Barker, Jerry Bock, Larry Holofcener, George David Weiss) – 3:57
19. "Midnight Sun" (Sonny Burke, Lionel Hampton, Johnny Mercer) – 4:23
20. "Trav'lin' Light" (Mercer, Jimmy Mundy, Trummy Young) – 2:49
21. "Love Is Here to Stay" (George Gershwin, Ira Gershwin) – 3:20

== Personnel ==
Performance

- Carmen McRae – vocal
- Ray Beckenstein – flute
- Joe Puma – guitar
- Paul Breslin – double bass
- Jose Mangual – bongos
- Frank Severino – drums
