= Woman Talk =

Live album by Carmen McRae
- Released: 1966
- Recorded: November 3–21, 1965
- Venue: The Village Gate, NYC
- Genre: Jazz
- Length: 38:20
- Label: Mainstream 56065/S6065
- Producer: Harry Ringler

Carmen McRae chronology
Haven't We Met? (1965)	Woman Talk (1966)	Alfie (1966)

Woman Talk is a live album by jazz vocalist Carmen McRae featuring tracks recorded at the Village Gate in New York in November 1965 and originally released on the Mainstream label the following year. The second half of the concert came out in 1968 as "Live" & Wailing. The whole recording was compiled on a double LP in 1973 under the title Alive!.

== Reception ==
Professional ratings
Review scores
Source	Rating
Allmusic	3/5 stars

Allmusic awarded the album 3 stars and states "All in all, a very satisfying set from a singer who may not be quite up to the level of Billie Holiday, Ella Fitzgerald, and Sarah Vaughan, but who is certainly close enough to be numbered among the vocal jazz elite".

== Track listing ==
1. "Sometimes I'm Happy" (Vincent Youmans, Irving Caesar, Clifford Grey) – 3:27
2. "Don't Explain" (Arthur Herzog, Jr., Billie Holiday) – 4:15
3. "Woman Talk" (John Scott, Caryl Brahms) – 4:51
4. "Kick Off Your Shoes" (Cy Coleman, Murray Grand) – 2:16
5. "The Shadow of Your Smile" (Johnny Mandel, Paul Francis Webster) – 3:53
6. "The Sweetest Sounds" (Richard Rodgers) – 2:03
7. "Where Would You Be Without Me?" (Anthony Newley, Leslie Bricusse) – 2:34
8. "Feeling Good" (Newley, Bricusse) – 4:33
9. "Run, Run, Run" (Russ Freeman, J. Reisner) – 2:30
10. "No More" (Tutti Camarata, Bob Russell) – 3:19
11. "Look at That Face" (Bricusse, Newley) – 5:02
12. "I Wish I Were in Love Again" (Rodgers, Lorenz Hart) – 1:33

== Personnel ==
- Carmen McRae – vocal
- Ray Beckenstein – flute
- Norman Simmons – piano
- Jo Puma – guitar
- Paul Breslin – double bass
- Frank Severino – drums
- Jose Mangual – bongos
