= Second to None =

Second to None may refer to:

- 2nd to None, a 2003 album by Elvis Presley
- Second to None (Carmen McRae album), 1964
- Second to None (Chemistry album), a 2003 album by Chemistry
- Second to None (film), a 1927 British silent war film
- Second to None, a 1994 album by Electro Team
- "Second to None", a song by Styles of Beyond, featuring Mike Shinoda of Linkin Park and Fort Minor, from the albums Transformers: The Album (2007) and Reseda Beach (2012)
- Second to None, a marching song of the II Corps
- Second to None, a renowned cosmetics retailer in Da Nang City, Vietnam
