= I Concentrate on You =

1940 song written and composed by Cole Porter

"I Concentrate on You" is a song written by Cole Porter for the 1940 film Broadway Melody of 1940, where it was introduced by Douglas McPhail.

== Notable recordings ==
- Frank Sinatra – Songs by Sinatra, Vol. 1 (1950), Sinatra's Swingin' Session!!! (1961), Francis Albert Sinatra & Antonio Carlos Jobim (1967)
- Fred Astaire – The Astaire Story (1952)
- Perry Como - TV Favorites (1952), Easy Listening (1970)
- Dinah Washington – released as a single in 1955, peaking at No. 11 on the Best Sellers in Stores chart and included on her 1960 album I Concentrate on You
- Ella Fitzgerald – Ella Fitzgerald Sings the Cole Porter Songbook (1956), Ella Loves Cole (1972)
- Judy Garland – Judy in Love (1958)
- Stan Kenton – Back to Balboa (1958)
- Mel Tormé – Mel Tormé Sings About Love (1958), A Day in the Life of Bonnie and Clyde (1968)
- Carmen McRae – When You're Away (1959), Recorded Live at Bubba's (1981)
- Oscar Peterson – Oscar Peterson Plays the Cole Porter Songbook (1959)
- Tito Puente – Revolving Bandstand (1960)
- Lena Horne – Lena...Lovely and Alive (1962)
- Rosemary Clooney – Rosemary Clooney Sings the Music of Cole Porter (1982)
- Tony Bennett and Lady Gaga recorded a version of the song for their 2021 collaborative album Love for Sale.
