= Any Old Time =

Any Old Time may refer to:

- "Any Old Time (You're Lonely and Sad)", a 1968 song by The Foundations
- Any Old Time (album), a 1986 album by Carmen McRae
- Any Old Time, a song on the 1988 album Back of My Mind
- "Any Old Time" (Artie Shaw song), a 1938/9 song by Artie Shaw, featuring Billie Holiday
- Any Old Time, a song on the 1973 self-titled album Maria Muldaur
