= Old Folks (1938 song) =

1938 popular song and jazz standard composed by Willard Robison

"Old Folks" is a 1938 popular song and jazz standard composed by Willard Robison with lyrics by Dedette Lee Hill, the wife and occasional colleague of Billy Hill. The lyrics tell of an old man nicknamed "Old Folks" and reference his service in the American Civil War, his habit of smoking with a "yellow cob pipe", and the prospect of his death.

A 1938 version by Larry Clinton and His Orchestra and vocalist Bea Wain charted at No. 4; around this time it was also recorded by Mildred Bailey and Bing Crosby and performed on radio by Benny Goodman and Fats Waller. It was recorded on saxophone by Don Byas in 1946 and saxophonist Ben Webster, who made more than a dozen recordings of the song and often performed it in concert as a ballad, first recorded it in 1951. Its most famous jazz version is by trumpeter Miles Davis on Someday My Prince Will Come (1961).

== Other notable recordings ==
- Charlie Parker – Big Band (1953)
- Wes Montgomery – Far Wes (1958)
- Max Roach – Award-Winning Drummer (1959)
- Kenny Dorham – Quiet Kenny (1960)
- Jack Teagarden, with Don Goldie – Think Well of Me (1962)
- Jimmy Smith – Open House (1968)
- Carmen McRae – At the Great American Music Hall (1976)
- Clare Fischer – Duality (1980); reissued on Memento (1992)
- Ernestine Anderson – Never Make Your Move Too Soon (1981)
- Keith Jarrett – Standards in Norway (1989)
- Pat Metheny – Question and Answer (1990)
- Oscar Peterson – Saturday Night at the Blue Note (1992)
- Chris Botti – Vol. 1. (2023)
- Christian McBride – Without Further Ado, Vol 1 (2025)

== See also ==
- List of 1930s jazz standards
