= Velvet Soul =

Velvet Soul may refer to:

- Velvet Soul (Gene Ammons album), 1964
- Velvet Soul (Carmen McRae album), 1975
