= John Collins (jazz guitarist) =

American jazz guitarist

- Born: John Elbert Collins; September 20, 1913; Montgomery, Alabama, U.S.
- Died: October 4, 2001 (aged 88) Los Angeles, California, U.S.
- Genres: Jazz
- Occupation: Musician
- Instrument: Guitar
- Formerly of: Nat King Cole trio

John Elbert Collins (September 20, 1913 – October 4, 2001) was an American jazz guitarist who was a member of the Nat King Cole trio.

== Career ==
A native of Alabama, Collins grew up in Chicago. When he was fourteen, he performed with his mother, Georgia Gorham, who was a jazz pianist. At twenty-one, he played with Art Tatum in the 1930s, followed by Roy Eldridge, Billie Holiday, Lester Young, Fletcher Henderson, and Benny Carter. At the end of the 1930s, he started playing electric guitar.

Collins served in the U.S. Army during the 1940s, then returned to his musical career, working with Slam Stewart, Kenny Clarke, Ike Quebec, Eddie "Lockjaw" Davis, Erroll Garner, Billy Taylor, Tadd Dameron, Coleman Hawkins, Artie Shaw, and Vic Dickenson.

Collins replaced Irving Ashby as the guitarist for the Nat King Cole trio. He was a member of the trio until Cole died in 1965. Collins then worked with vocalist Patti Page, followed by several years with Bobby Troup. In the early 1970s, he worked with Ray Brown, Carmen McRae, and Snooky Young. Then he spent time teaching in Los Angeles. He appears on the 1983 album Jackson, Johnson, Brown & Company with Milt Jackson on vibes, J. J. Johnson on trombone, Ray Brown on bass, Tom Ranier on piano, and Roy McCurdy on drums.

He recorded The Incredible John Collins, his only album as a leader, with Jimmy Woode and Alvin Queen.

Collins was inducted into the Alabama Jazz Hall of Fame in 1993. He died of cancer on October 4, 2001, at the age of 88.

== Discography ==
=== As leader ===
- The Incredible John Collins (Nilva)

=== As sideman ===
With Hoyt Axton

- Hoyt Axton Sings Bessie Smith (Exodus, 1965)

With Ruth Brown

- Ruth Brown (Atlantic, 1957)

With Natalie Cole

- Unforgettable... with Love (Elektra, 1991)

With Nat King Cole

- After Midnight (Capitol, 1957)

With Harry Edison

- Sweets for the Sweet Taste of Love (Vee-Jay, 1964)

With Ted Gärdestad

- Blue Virgin Isles (Polar, 1978)

With Illinois Jacquet

- Groovin' with Jacquet (Clef, 1956)

With Peggy Lee

- Then Was Then – Now Is Now! (Capitol Records, 1965)
- Guitars a là Lee (Capitol Records, 1966)

With Carmen McRae

- You're Lookin' at Me (A Collection of Nat King Cole Songs) (Concord, 1983)
- Any Old Time (Denon, 1986)

With Maria Muldaur

- Waitress in a Donut Shop (Reprise, 1974)

With Frankie Randall

- Going The Frankie Randall Way! (RCA Victor, 1966)

With Della Reese

- Della on Strings of Blue (ABC, 1967)

With Billy Taylor

- Piano Panorama (Atlantic, 1952)

With Joe Williams

- I Just Want to Sing (Delos, 1985)
