= I Am Music =

I Am Music may refer to:

== Albums ==
- I Am Music (Carmen McRae album), 1975
- I Am Music (Lil Wayne album), 2023
- I Am Music, an album by Prince Kaybee, 2017
- Music, a 2025 album by Playboi Carti which was tentatively known as I Am Music

== Songs ==
- "I Am Music", a song by Common from the album Electric Circus, 2002
- "I Am Music", a song by Timbaland & Magoo from the album Indecent Proposal, 2001

== Other uses ==
- I Am Music Tour, a 2008 concert tour by Lil Wayne
- I Am Music II Tour, a 2011 concert tour by Lil Wayne
