= This Is Carmen McRae =

Compilation album by Carmen McRae
- Released: 1967
- Recorded: 1958–1959
- Genre: Vocal jazz
- Length: 34:56
- Label: Kapp

Carmen McRae chronology
For Once in My Life (1966)	This Is Carmen McRae (1967)	Portrait of Carmen (1968)

This Is Carmen McRae is a compilation album by American singer Carmen McRae, released in 1967 by Kapp Records after she left there. The album features compositions from three series of recordings made in 1958 and 1959.

== Critical reception ==
Professional ratings
Review scores
Source	Rating
AllMusic	3/5 stars
The Encyclopedia of Popular Music	4/5 stars

The review of Cash Box magazine emphasized that MacRae interprets the songs, demonstrating impeccable style, and sings with feeling and drama, and the album itself, in their opinion, should become a big hit among MacRae fans. Record World noted that this is "a great group of standards done to just the right turn by Carmen."

Ken Dryden in a retrospective review for AllMusic stated that the singer is as eloquent as possible, conveying the emotions of each song in a sweeping manner. He also noted the touching performance of the song "Angel Eyes", where McRae accompanies herself on the piano, and "The More I See You", where she restores an often missed verse, supported by a delicate arrangement by Luther Henderson.

== Track listing ==
1. "Comes Love" (Lew Brown, Sam H. Stept, Charles Tobias) – 2:43
2. "Angel Eyes" (Earl K. Brent, Matt Dennis) – 2:40
3. "Ain't Misbehavin'" (Harry Brooks, Andy Razaf, Fats Waller) – 3:16
4. "The More I See You" (Mack Gordon, Harry Warren) – 4:00
5. "By Myself" (Howard Dietz, Arthur Schwartz) – 3:14
6. "How Little We Know" (Carolyn Leigh, Philip Springer) – 2:27
7. "I Only Have Eyes for You" (Al Dubin, Harry Warren) – 3:47
8. "How Long Has This Been Going On" (George Gershwin, Ira Gershwin) – 4:04
9. "If Love Is Good to Me" (Redd Evans, Fred Spielman) – 3:28
10. "Falling in Love with Love" (Lorenz Hart, Richard Rodgers) – 2:10
11. "I'm Glad There Is You" (Jimmy Dorsey, Paul Mertz) – 3:53

== Personnel ==
- Carmen McRae — vocals
- Ernie Wilkins — arrangement (1, 6)
- Luther Henderson — arrangement (3, 4, 8–10)
- Frank Hunter — arrangement (2, 5, 7, 11)
