= Alfie (Carmen McRae album) =

Studio album by Carmen McRae
- Released: August 1966
- Recorded: August 4 and September 1964; February 2 and 3, 1965
- Genre: Vocal jazz
- Length: 28:43
- Label: Mainstream

Carmen McRae chronology
Woman Talk (1966)	Alfie (1966)	For Once in My Life (1967)

Alfie is a 1966 studio album by jazz singer Carmen McRae, arranged and conducted by Don Sebesky and Peter Matz. It was released on Mainstream Records on vinyl LP.

== Overview ==
Some of the songs had previously been released on the album Second to None (1964) and Haven't We Met? (1965). The new song on the album was "Alfie", it was recorded in 1965. It was also released as a single with the non-album song "Modesty" (written by Benny Green and John Dankworth) from the movie Modesty Blaise on the b-side. The single was able to enter the Billboard magazine Top 40 Easy Listening chart at the 29th position.

== Critical reception ==
Professional ratings
Review scores
Source	Rating
AllMusic	3/5 stars
Billboard	4/4 stars
The Encyclopedia of Popular Music	3/5 stars

The review of Cash Box magazine noted that "the warm, tender highly pleasing song stylings of sweet voiced Carmen McRae make this set of top recent tunes an apt item for inclusion in a good music collection." A reviewer for Record World magazine stated that When Carmen does sing something, "it becomes the definitive version more likely than not."

== Track listing ==
1. "Alfie" (Burt Bacharach, Hal David) – 2:43
2. "Who Can I Turn To?" (Leslie Bricusse, Anthony Newley) – 3:00
3. "The Shadow of Your Smile" (Johnny Mandel, Paul Francis Webster) — 2:50
4. "The Music That Makes Me Dance" (The Music That Makes Me Dance, Jule Styne) – 2:37
5. "Don't Ever Leave Me" (Oscar Hammerstein II, Jerome Kern) – 2:37
6. "The Night Has a Thousand Eyes" (Buddy Bernier, Jerry Brainin) – 3:09
7. "Once Upon a Summertime" (Michel Legrand, Eddie Barclay, Eddy Marnay, Johnny Mercer) – 3:20
8. "And I Love Him" (John Lennon, Paul McCartney) – 2:12
9. "He Loves Me" (Jerry Bock, Sheldon Harnick) – 2:07
10. "The Sweetest Sounds" (Richard Rodgers) — 2:01

== Charts ==
Chart performance for Alfie
Chart (1966–1967)	Peak position
US Billboard 200	150
US Cash Box Top 100 Albums	105
US Record World Top 100 LP's	89
