= Ralph Gleason's Jazz Casual: Mel Tormé & Carmen McRae =

Live album (compilation) by Mel Tormé and Carmen McRae
- Released: August 14, 2001
- Recorded: 1962; 1964
- Genre: Jazz; interview
- Label: Koch Jazz

Mel Tormé chronology
Mel Tormé's Finest Hour (2001)	Ralph Gleason's Jazz Casual: Mel Tormé & Carmen McRae (2001)	Again (2001)

Carmen McRae chronology
Carmen McRae's Finest Hour (2000)	Ralph Gleason's Jazz Casual: Mel Tormé & Carmen McRae (2001)	At Ratso's (2002)

Ralph Gleason's Jazz Casual: Mel Tormé & Carmen McRae is a live split album by American artists Mel Tormé and Carmen McRae, released on August 14, 2001, by Koch Jazz. The album features recordings of performances and interviews of artists on the Jazz Casual music program by Ralph J. Gleason, made in 1962 and 1964. A little earlier, the recordings were released on VHS.

== Critical reception ==
Professional ratings
Review scores
Source	Rating
AllMusic	4.5/5 stars

Ken Dryden of AllMusic stated that both vocalists are in great form. He noted that Mel Tormé can be heard for the first time with a trio of little-known musicians who provide excellent support, but the songs performed in the first half of the show do not match the last part, including a cheerful excerpt of "Dat Dere," a dreamy "When Sunny Gets Blue" and a rare opportunity to hear the singer playing the ukulele in "Quiet Nights (Corcavado)," and also on piano. In his opinion, Carmen McRae has no weaknesses either, as she confidently performs excellent material with a strong rhythm section; Starting with a jerky rendition of "I'm Gonna Lock My Heart And Throw Away The Key," McRae holds the audience in the palm of her hand, while her touching rendition of "Trouble Is a Man" makes a strong impression. The only disappointment for him was the rapid termination of the performance of "Exactly Like You" by the end of the broadcast (due to lack of time in the series), since MacRae was an experienced pianist who rarely recorded on an instrument.

Doug Ramsey of JazzTimes singled out McRae's "I'm Gonna Lock My Heart" with a funny tempo and "Round Midnight," as heartfelt as anything she's ever sung. According to him, anyone who has only heard and never seen Carmen will be amazed by her beauty, strength of character and ability to find contact with the audience, even when the audience is a digital camera in a box on wheels.

== Track listing ==
Mel Tormé

1. "We've Got a World That Swing" – 2:09
2. "Interview" – 7:24
3. "Comin' Home Baby" – 2:31
4. "Mel Speaks" – 1:20
5. "Sidney's Soliloquy" – 2:26
6. "Mel Speaks" – 0:34
7. "Dat Dere" – 2:36
8. "Mel Speaks" – 1:00
9. "When Sunny Get Blue" – 3:01
10. "Mel Speaks" – 1:08
11. "Quiet Nights" – 2:21
12. "Route 66" – 1:51

Carmen McRae

13. "I'm Gonna Lock My Heart And Throw Away The Key" – 2:42
14. "Interview" – 6:09
15. "Trouble Is a Man" – 3:44
16. "Carmen with Norman Simmons" – 1:04
17. "If You Never Fall in Love with Me" – 3:36
18. "Carmen with Norman Simmons" – 0:49
19. "'Round Midnight" – 4:31
20. "Carmen with Norman Simmons" – 0:41
21. "Love for Sale" – 4:30
22. "Closing Remarks by Ralph Gleason" – 0:13
23. "Exactly Like You" – 0:26

== Personnel ==
Credits are adapted from the album's liner notes.

- Mel Tormé (1–12) – vocals, piano, ukulele
- Carmen McRae (13–23) – vocals, piano
- Perry Lind (1–12), Victor Sproles (13–23) – bass
- Benny Barth (1–12), Walter Perkins (13–23) – drums
- Gary Long (1–12), Norman Simmons (13–23) – piano
