= Velvet Soul (Carmen McRae album) =

Compilation album by Carmen McRae
- Released: 1975
- Recorded: 1972–1973
- Genre: Vocal jazz
- Length: 1:12:40
- Label: Groove Merchant
- Producer: Sonny Lester

Carmen McRae chronology
I Am Music (1975)	Velvet Soul (1975)	November Girl (1975)

Velvet Soul is a double compilation album by American singer Carmen McRae, released in 1975 by Groove Merchant.

== Critical reception ==
Professional ratings
Review scores
Source	Rating
AllMusic	3/5 stars
The Encyclopedia of Popular Music	3/5 stars
The Rolling Stone Jazz & Blues Album Guide	3.5/5 stars

Ron Wynn of AllMusic noted that while working with Groove Merchant, McRae recorded a mix of standards, ballads, blues and some original songs, as well as experimenting with soul jazz. In his opinion, they are not made as well as her material on some other labels, but they are interesting in order to show the mood of the label during the transition period of the 70s. Stereo Review reviewer Chris Albertson noted the pleasant variety, seasoned with velvety notes and sometimes thought-provoking contributions from artists such as Zoot Sims.

== Track listing ==
Side A

1. "You Are the Sunshine of My Life" (Stevie Wonder) – 3:07
2. "You and I" (Stevie Wonder) – 4:44
3. "You're Mine, You" (Johnny Green, Edward Heyman) – 3:06
4. "Exactly Like You" (Jimmy McHugh, Dorothy Fields) – 3:34
5. "This Masquerade" (Leon Russell) – 3:45

Side B

1. "The Good Life" (Sacha Distel, Jack Reardon) – 2:48
2. "How Could I Settle for Less" (Sacha Distel, Jean Broussolle, Robert I. Allen) – 2:32
3. "There'll Come a Time" (Shelton Brooks) – 4:14
4. "Livin'" (Tom Garvin) – 4:27
5. "Hey John" (Blossom Dearie, Jim Council) – 3:20

Side C

1. "It Takes a Whole Lot of Human Feeling" (Micki Grant) – 3:45
2. "I Fall in Love Too Easily" (Jule Styne, Sammy Cahn) – 3:44
3. "Hey John" (Blossom Dearie, Jim Council) – 3:21
4. "Where Are the Words" (Frank Severino) – 3:14
5. "Nice Work If You Can Get It" (George Gershwin, Ira Gershwin) – 2:45

Side D

1. "Straighten Up and Fly Right" (Nat King Cole, Irving Mills) – 2:57
2. "Inside a Silent Tear" (Blossom Dearie, Peter King) – 5:48
3. "Imagination" (Jimmy Van Heusen. Johnny Burke) – 4:17
4. "The Right to Love" (Lalo Schifrin, Gene Lees) – 4:11
5. "All the Things You Are" (Jerome Kern, Oscar Hammerstein II) – 3:57

== Personnel ==
- Carmen McRae – vocals
- Paul West, Ray Brown – bass guitar
- Frank Severino, Jimmy Madison – drums
- Bucky Pizzarelli, Joe Pass – guitar
- Dick Shreve, Tom Garvin – piano
- Zoot Sims – tenor saxophone
- Larry Bunker – vibraphone, percussion
