= For Lady Day (Carmen McRae album) =

- The cover of the first volume; the cover of the second is the same, only in blue

Live album by Carmen McRae
- Released: March 14, 1995 (Vol.1); October 24, 1995 (Vol.2)
- Recorded: December 31, 1983
- Venues: Blue Note Club, New York
- Genre: Vocal jazz
- Length: 51:12 (Vol. 1); 56:15 (Vol. 2)
- Label: Novus
- Producer: Larry Clothier

Carmen McRae chronology
Song Time (1993)	For Lady Day (1995)	I'll Be Seeing You (1998)

For Lady Day is a live album by American singer Carmen McRae, released in two volumes in 1995 by Novus Records. The album is a tribute to singer Billie Holiday, who was McRae's mentor and friend. The set was recorded on New Year's Eve 1984 at the Blue Note nightclub in New York, live broadcast by the jazz radio station WBGO-FM (Jazz 88).

== Critical reception ==
Professional ratings
Review scores
Source	Rating
AllMusic	4.5/5 stars
The Encyclopedia of Popular Music	4/5 stars
The Rolling Stone Jazz & Blues Album Guide	4/5 stars

AllMusic reviewer Scott Yanow, commenting on the first part of the album, stated that the singer is in great shape, combining the power and range of her previous years with the emotional depth and familiar phrasing of her later period, and really delves into the material, interpreting the songs in her own style, but with an understanding bias towards Holiday. In his opinion, this wonderful set far surpasses most Billie Holiday tribute albums and reminds us how much we miss Carmen McRae. Speaking about the second part, Ken Dryden stated that MacRae is not trying to sing Holiday's material in the same way, but uses her own powerful, emotional approach, often lagging behind the rhythm. Stereo Review magazine stated that the album does not represent the late Carmen McRae at her best. "There's far too much chit-chat; someone should have told her to stop talking and stick to singing," the reviewer wrote.

== Track listing ==
=== Volume 1 ===
1. "Intro" – 3:31
2. "Miss Brown to You" – 2:34
3. "Good Morning Heartache" – 4:22
4. "I'm Gonna Lock My Heart (And Throw Away the Key)" – 4:24
5. "Fine and Mellow" – 6:24
6. "Them There Eyes" – 1:26
7. "Lover Man" – 6:29
8. "I Cried for You" – 2:19
9. "God Bless the Child" – 6:42
10. "I Hear Music" – 2:58
11. "I'm Pulling Through" – 3:12
12. "Don't Explain" – 4:06
13. "What a Little Moonlight Can Do" – 2:50

=== Volume 2 ===
1. "Intro" – 3:27
2. "Laughing at Life" – 2:06
3. "You Ain't Gonna Bother Me No More" – 3:48
4. "Easy Livin'" – 2:53
5. "Yesterdays" – 6:18
6. "My Old Flame" – 1:26
7. "Nice Work If You Can Get It" – 2:50
8. "Billie's Blues" – 4:48
9. "Travelin' Light" – 3:26
10. "Medley: If You Were Mine / It's Like Reaching for the Moon" – 5:46
11. "I'm Painting the Town Red" – 1:36
12. "You've Changed" – 5:31
13. "Mean to Me" – 3:12

== Personnel ==
- Carmen McRae – vocals, piano
- John Leftwich – bass
- Donald Bailey – drums
- Rhonda Hamilton – intro
- Marshall Otwell – piano
- Zoot Sims – tenor saxophone

Credits are adapted from the album's liner notes.

== Charts ==
Chart performance for For Lady Day
Chart (1995)	Peak position
US Top Jazz Albums (Billboard)	17
