= Portrait of Carmen =

Studio album by Carmen McRae
- Released: 1968
- Recorded: November 27–29, 1967
- Studio: United Recording Studio, Los Angeles
- Genre: Vocal jazz
- Length: 34:24
- Label: Atlantic SD 8165
- Producer: Nesuhi Ertegun

Carmen McRae chronology
For Once in My Life (1967)	Portrait of Carmen (1968)	The Sound of Silence (1968)

Portrait of Carmen is a 1968 studio album by Carmen McRae, arranged and conducted by Oliver Nelson, Shorty Rogers, Benny Carter and Gene Di Novi and produced by Nesuhi Ertegun. It was released on vinyl LP on Atlantic Records.

== Reception ==
Professional ratings
Review scores
Source	Rating
Allmusic	4/5 stars

The Allmusic review by Jason Ankeny awarded the album four stars and said that "Portrait of Carmen doesn't so much update the great Carmen McRae's sound and sensibility as it reflects a world that's finally caught up to her way of thinking, capitalizing on the irony and sophistication so long essential to her music to create a record that is both fiercely individual and universally accessible. The title's no afterthought...Portrait of Carmen captures her brilliance for posterity".

== Track listing ==
1. "I'm Always Drunk in San Francisco" (Tommy Wolf) - 3:04
2. "Elusive Butterfly" (Bob Lind) - 3:03
3. "Day by Day" (Sammy Cahn, Axel Stordahl, Paul Weston) - 2:28
4. "When You Get Around Me" (Fred E. Ahlert) - 2:57
5. "Walking Happy" (Cahn, Jimmy Van Heusen) - 2:40
6. "My Very Own Person" (Gene Di Novi) - 2:59
7. "Ask Any Woman" (Gerald Langley, J. Stewart) - 3:01
8. "Boy, Do I Have a Surprise for You" (Novi) - 3:26
9. "Loads of Love" (Richard Rodgers) - 3:58
10. "I Haven't Got Anything Better to Do" (Lee Pockriss, Paul Vance) - 4:34
11. "Wonder Why" (Nicholas Brodszky, Cahn) - 2:14

== Personnel ==
- Carmen McRae - vocals
- Oliver Nelson - arranger: 3, 5, 9, 11
- Shorty Rogers - arranger: 2, 4, 7
- Benny Carter - arranger: 1, 10
- Gene Di Novi - arranger: 6, 8
