= Bittersweet (Carmen McRae album) =

Studio album by Carmen McRae
- Released: 1964
- Recorded: May 20, 1964
- Genre: Vocal jazz
- Length: 43:10
- Label: Focus
- Producer: Mort Fega

Carmen McRae chronology
Live at Sugar Hill (1963)	Bittersweet (1964)	Second to None (1964)

Professional ratings
Review scores
Source	Rating
AllMusic	4/5 stars
The Encyclopedia of Popular Music	3/5 stars

Bittersweet is a studio album by American singer Carmen McRae, released in 1964 on producer Mort Feghi's independent label Focus Records and distributed by Atlantic Records. The album received critical acclaim.

== Track listing ==
1. "When Sunny Gets Blue" (Marvin Fisher, Jack Segal) – 3:50
2. "How Did He Look?" (Gladys Shelley, Abner Silver) – 3:08
3. "Guess I'll Hang My Tears Out to Dry" (Sammy Cahn, Jule Styne) – 3:36
4. "The Meaning of the Blues" (Bobby Troup, Leah Worth) – 2:49
5. "If You Could Love Me" (Norman Simmons) – 2:08
6. "Spring Can Really Hang You Up the Most" (Fran Landesman, Tommy Wolf) – 6:21
7. "Second Chance" (Dory Langdon, André Previn) – 3:37
8. "If You Could See Me Now" (Tadd Dameron, Carl Sigman) – 2:52
9. "Here's That Rainy Day" (Johnny Burke, James Van Heusen) – 2:44
10. "I'm Gonna Laugh You Right out of My Life" (Cy Coleman, Joseph McCarthy) – 3:23
11. "Ghost of Yesterday" (Arthur Herzog Jr., Irene Kitchings) – 3:09
12. "I'm Lost" (Otis René) – 2:53
13. "Come Sunday" (Duke Ellington) – 2:40

== Personnel ==
- Carmen McRae – vocals, piano (10)
- Victor Sproles – bass
- Curtis Boyd – drums
- Tom Dowd – engineer
- Mundell Lowe – guitar
- Norman Simmons – piano
- Mort Fega – producer

Credits are adapted from the album's liner notes.
