= As Time Goes By: Live at the Dug =

Live album by Carmen McRae
- Released: May 10, 1974
- Recorded: November 21, 1973
- Venue: Jazz club Dug, Tokyo
- Genre: Vocal jazz
- Length: 50:39
- Label: Victor

Carmen McRae chronology
Ms. Jazz (1974)	As Time Goes By: Live at the Dug (1974)	Live and Doin' It (1974)

As Time Goes By: Carmen McRae Alone Live at the Dug is a live album by American singer Carmen McRae. The album was recorded at the Tokyo jazz club Dug and originally released in Japan in 1974 by the Victor label. Two years later, the album was released in the United States by the independent label Catalyst Records. The peculiarity of the album is that it was the only time when McRae accompanied herself on the piano, and other musicians did not take part in the recording.

== Critical reception ==
Professional ratings
Review scores
Source	Rating
AllMusic	4/5 stars
The Rolling Stone Jazz Record Guide	4/5 stars

AllMusic reviewer Stephen Cook found it impressive that MacRae accompanies herself, noting that if someone is not quite sure whether to put her in the same company as Sarah Vaughan or Dinah Washington, then this collection of numbers should definitely tip the scales. Paul Kresh of Stereo Review stated that the album culminated in a delightful and dramatic rendition of "Supper Time", which focuses more on smoldering humility, as opposed to the bitter despair in Ethel Waters' version–but it still has an original poignancy.

== Track listing ==
1. "As Time Goes By" (Herman Hupfeld) – 5:49
2. "I Could Have Told You So" (Carl Sigman, Jimmy Van Heusen) — 4:21
3. "More Than You Know" (Edward Eliscu, Billy Rose, Vincent Youmans) – 5:27
4. "I Can't Escape from You" (Leo Robin, Richard A. Whiting) — 3:50
5. "Try a Little Tenderness" (Jimmy Campbell, Reginald Connelly, Harry Woods) – 4:00
6. "The Last Time for Love" (Carmen McRae) – 6:26
7. "Supper Time" (Irving Berlin) – 3:33
8. "Do You Know Why?" (Johnny Burke, Van Heusen) – 4:51
9. "But Not for Me" (George Gershwin, Ira Gershwin) – 6:01
10. "Please Be Kind" (Sammy Cahn, Saul Chaplin) – 6:21
