= Recorded Live at Bubba's =

Live album by Carmen McRae
- Released: 1981
- Recorded: 17 January 1981
- Venue: Bubba's Jazz Club, Fort Lauderdale, Florida
- Genre: Vocal jazz
- Length: 45:25
- Label: Who's Who in Jazz
- Producer: Robert Shelley, Robert W. Schachner

Carmen McRae chronology
Two for the Road (1980)	Recorded Live at Bubba's (1981)	Heat Wave (1982)

Live at Bubba's is a 1981 live album by jazz singer Carmen McRae.

== Reception ==
Professional ratings
Review scores
Source	Rating
AllMusic	3/5 stars
The Rolling Stone Jazz Record Guide	3/5 stars

AllMusic awarded the album three stars and reviewer Ken Dryden wrote that McRae's "...vocals are confident and seem effortless...The sound is excellent, with a respectfully quiet audience...fans of McRae will want to pick this up." The continuity of the tracks on the album led Dryden to wonder if the album had been recorded over several performances rather than a single one.

== Track listing ==
1. "That Old Black Magic" (Harold Arlen, Johnny Mercer) – 3:47
2. "Superwoman" (Stevie Wonder) – 4:11
3. "I Concentrate on You" (Cole Porter) – 4:44
4. "New York State of Mind" (Billy Joel) – 5:24
5. "Underneath the Apple Tree" (Michael Franks) – 4:16
6. "Thou Swell" (Richard Rodgers, Lorenz Hart) – 1:17
7. "Send in the Clowns" (Stephen Sondheim) – 4:43
8. "I Just Can't Wait to See You" (Mark Franklin) – 5:17
9. "How Long Has This Been Going On?" (George Gershwin, Ira Gershwin) – 4:45
10. "If I Were a Bell" (Frank Loesser) – 1:45
11. "My Foolish Heart" (Ned Washington, Victor Young) – 7:14
12. "Secret Love" (Sammy Fain, Paul Francis Webster) – 4:10

== Personnel ==
- Carmen McRae – vocals
- Marshall Otwell – piano
- Jay Anderson – double bass
- Mark Pulice – drums
