= I'm Coming Home Again =

Studio album by Carmen McRae
- Released: March 1980
- Recorded: November–December 1979
- Studio: Columbia Recording Studios, New York City
- Genre: Vocal jazz
- Length: 1:15:26
- Label: Buddah
- Producer: Vic Chirumbolo

Carmen McRae chronology
Jazz Gala 79 (1979)	I'm Coming Home Again (1980)	Two for the Road (1980)

I'm Coming Home Again is a double studio album by American singer Carmen McRae, released in March 1980 by Buddah Records. It was produced by Vic Cirumbolo and arranged by Mario Sprouse and Terri Gonzalez. The album was also re-released under the name Ms. Magic with selected tracks and a different cover.

== Critical reception ==
Professional ratings
Review scores
Source	Rating
AllMusic	3/5 stars
The Encyclopedia of Popular Music	3/5 stars

Cash Box magazine noted that "McRae is one of the most unique song stylists in jazz, with a gruff yet satin voice, expressive phrasing and great story-telling depth. I'm Coming Home Again finds McRae in lush, sympathetic settings that recall the halycon days of Creed Taylor's CTI productions, several of these highly-arranged songs have great black contemporary and adult contemporary potential." A Record World magazine reviewer stated that MacRae "is in excellent form here. Backed by an all-star gathering of talent, such as Freddie Hubbard, Buster Williams and Hubert Laws, she effortlessly glides through this varied material. This double LP package is a must for jazz airplay and should have a place on all R&B stations that play just good music." Ron Wynn of AllMusic, commenting on the "stripped-down" reissue, stated that it is "a good compilation of obscure cuts from McRae in different contexts."

== Track listing ==
Side A

1. "I'm Coming Home Again" (Bruce Roberts, Carole Bayer Sager) – 4:18
2. "Burst in With the Dawn" (Al Jarreau) – 4:34
3. "I Need You in My Life" (Arthur and Charlotte Schlosser) – 3:58
4. "Come in from the Rain" (Melissa Manchester, Carole Bayer Sager) – 4:18

Side B

1. "I Won't Last a Day Without You" (Roger Nichols, Paul Williams) – 7:06
2. "Won'tcha Stay With Me" (Henry E. Davis) – 6:10
3. "Mr. Magic I" (Ralph MacDonald, William Salter) – 4:54

Side C

1. "Everything Must Change" (Benard Ighner) – 9:10
2. "Sweet Alibis" (Marvin Hamlisch, Carole Bayer Sager) – 4:50
3. "The Masquerade Is Over" (Herbert Magidson, Allie Wrubel) – 4:41
4. "I'd Rather Leave While I'm in Love" (Peter Allen, Carole Bayer Sager) – 4:35

Side D

1. "Mr. Magic II" (Ralph MacDonald, William Salter) – 14:09
2. "New York State of Mind" (Billy Joel) – 7:40

== Personnel ==
- Carmen McRae – vocals
- George Dalto – acoustic piano
- Mario Sprouse – arrangement, conductor, electric piano
- Terri Gonzalez – arrangement, conductor, backing vocals
- Buster Williams – bass guitar
- Chris Parker – drums
- Cornell Dupree – electric guitar
- Hubert Laws – flute, piccolo flute
- Hank Crawford – saxophone-viola
- Grover Washington, Alex Foster – soprano saxophone
- Akua Dixon, Bernard Zeller, Edith Wint, Garfield Moore, Gayle Dixon, Jenny Koo, John Blake, Johnson Ning, Nina Simon, Tom Suarez, Valerie Collymore, Winterton Garvey – strings
- Errol 'Crusher' Bennett – percussion
- Janice Robinson – trombone
- Freddie Hubbard, Lew Soloff, Virgil Jones – trumpet, flugelhorn

== Charts ==
Chart performance for I'm Coming Home Again
Chart (1980)	Peak position
US Best Selling Jazz LPs (Billboard)	20
