= Jazz Gala 79 =

1979 live album by Carmen McRae

Live album by Carmen McRae featuring Joe Williams, Claude Bolling, Thad Jones and Cat Anderson
- Released: 1979
- Recorded: January 22, 1979
- Venue: Palais des Festivals et des Congrès, Cannes
- Genre: Jazz
- Length: 1:05:15
- Label: America; Personal Choice

Carmen McRae chronology
Ronnie Scott's Presents Carmen McRae 'Live' (1977)	Jazz Gala 79 (1979)	I'm Coming Home Again (1980)

Jazz Gala 79 is a double live album recorded by American singer and pianist Carmen McRae with the participation of singer Joe Williams, trumpeters Thad Jones and Cat Anderson, as well as French pianist Claude Bolling at the Marché International du Disque et de l'Édition Musicale Festival in Cannes on January 22, 1979. The album was released the same year in France by America Records and Personal Choice Records in the United States.

== Critical reception ==
Professional ratings
Review scores
Source	Rating
AllMusic	3.5/5 stars 3/5 stars

Ken Dryden of AllMusic gave the album three and a half stars and wrote that McRae effectively performs ballads such as "Body and Soul" and "Tis Autumn", along with the perky "Bye Bye Blackbird", although her vocals suffer from reverberation caused by poor engineering. He also noticed that she also takes the rare opportunity to accompany herself on the piano for a restrained, conversational performance of "A Beautiful Friendship", where the problem with reverb magically disappears. Another AllMusic reviewer, Jason Birchmeier, gave the album three stars and stated that if you like the music of these musicians or other performances by the Thad Jones band, there is a high probability that you will like this performance, even if there is nothing special or new in it. Billboard magazine called the album a "wonderful record", where the rich baritone Joe Williams sang along with Carmen McRae.

== Track listing ==
1. "Bowling Green" (Holmes Daley, Terrence Callier) – 4:30
2. "Suivez le chef" (Claude Bolling) – 3:00
3. "Body and Soul" (Frank Eyton, Johnny Green, Edward Heyman, Robert Sour) – 3:30
4. "This Autumn" (Henry Nemo) – 4:20
5. "Bye-Bye Blackbird" (Mort Dixon, Ray Henderson) – 2:16
6. "End of a Beautiful Friendship" (Donald Kahn, Stanley Styne) – 2:50
7. "61st & Richard" (Thad Jones) – 8:00
8. "Back Bone" (Thad Jones) – 6:45
9. "Work Song" (Nat Adderley, Oscar Brown Jr.)– 2:50
10. "Blues in My Heart" (Benny Carter, Irving Mills) – 3:00
11. "Just the Way You Are" (Billy Joel) – 6:15
12. "It Don't Mean a Thing" (Duke Ellington, Irving Mills) – 3:12
13. "Jungle Trap" (Claude Bolling) – 5:12
14. "Rock Rhythm" (Duke Ellington) – 4:45
15. "Them There Eyes" (Maceo Pinkard, Doris Tauber, William Tracey) – 3:40
16. "Far Jammers" (Claude Bolling) – 1:10

== Personnel ==
- Carmen McRae – vocals, Joe Williams
- Guy Pedersen – bass
- Emile Vilain – bass Trombone
- Maurice Bouchon – drums
- John J. Cevetello – engineering, mixing
- Barthelemy Raffo – guitar
- Claude Bolling – piano
- Andre Villeger, Claude Tissendier – saxophone
- Pierre Gossez – saxophone, bass clarinet
- Jean Aldegon, Marcel Canillar – saxophone, flute
- Benny Vasseur, Bill Tamper, Michel Camicas – trombone
- Cat Anderson, Fernand Verstraete, Louis Vezant, Maurice Thomas, Patrick Artero, Thad Jones – trumpet
