= Memories of Duke =

Studio album by The Clark Terry Five
- Released: 1980
- Recorded: March 11, 1980
- Studio: Group IV Recording Studios, Hollywood, CA
- Genre: Jazz
- Length: 42:37
- Label: Pablo Today; 2312-118
- Producer: Norman Granz

Clark Terry chronology
Ain't Misbehavin (1979)	Memories of Duke (1980)	Yes, the Blues (1981)

Memories of Duke is an album by trumpeter Clark Terry, performing compositions by, or associated with, Duke Ellington, released on the Pablo Today label in 1980.

== Reception ==
Professional ratings
Review scores
Source	Rating
AllMusic	4/5 stars
The Penguin Guide to Jazz	4/4 stars

AllMusic's Scott Yanow noted: "Terry knows these songs, which include 'Cottontail', 'Come Sunday' and 'Sophisticated Lady', backwards, but he infuses each of his renditions with enthusiasm and melodic creativity. Recommended". The Penguin Guide to Jazz selected the album as part of its suggested Core Collection.

== Track listing ==
All compositions by Duke Ellington, except where indicated.

1. "Passion Flower" (Billy Strayhorn) - 4:27
2. "Happy Go Lucky Local" - 4:28
3. "Echoes of Harlem" - 4:01
4. "Sophisticated Lady" (Ellington, Mitchell Parish, Irving Mills) - 8:27
5. "Things Ain't What They Used to Be" (Mercer Ellington, Ted Persons) - 5:05
6. "I Let a Song Go Out of My Heart" (Ellington, Mills, Henry Nemo, John Redmond) - 3:28
7. "Cotton Tail" - 2:16
8. "Everything but You" (Ellington, Don George, Harry James) - 7:51
9. "Come Sunday" - 2:34

== Personnel ==
- Clark Terry - trumpet
- Jack Wilson - piano
- Joe Pass - guitar
- Ray Brown - bass
- Frank Severino - drums
