= Carmen McRae in London =

Live album by Carmen McRae
- Released: October 1961
- Recorded: May 1961
- Venue: Flamingo Jazz Club, London
- Genre: Vocal jazz
- Length: 37:56
- Label: Ember

Carmen McRae chronology
Tonight Only! (1961)	Carmen McRae in London (1961)	Carmen McRae Sings Lover Man and Other Billie Holiday Classics (1962)

Professional ratings
Review scores
Source	Rating
AllMusic	4/5 stars

Carmen McRae in London, also known as Carmen McRae at the Flamingo Jazz Club, is a live album by American singer Carmen McRae, recorded in 1961 at the Flamingo Jazz Club in London, accompanied by a trio consisting of her regular pianist Don Abney and the British Phil Seamen (drums) and Kenny Napper (bass). The album was released in 1961 only in the UK by Ember Records.

== Track listing ==
1. "I Could Write a Book" (Lorenz Hart, Richard Rodgers) – 2:56
2. "Body and Soul" (Frank Eyton, Johnny Green, Edward Heyman, Robert Sour) – 4:25
3. "Thou Swell" (Lorenz Hart, Richard Rodgers) – 1:29
4. "'Round Midnight" (Bernie Hanighen, Thelonious Monk, Cootie Williams) – 4:59
5. "A Foggy Day" (George Gershwin, Ira Gershwin) – 1:37
6. "Don't Ever Leave Me" (Oscar Hammerstein II, Jerome Kern) – 3:09
7. "Moonlight in Vermont" (Jerome Kern, Karl Suessdorf) – 3:56
8. "Day In – Day Out" (Rube Bloom, Johnny Mercer) – 1:58
9. "Lover Man" (Jimmy Davis, Roger "Ram" Ramirez, Jimmy Sherman) – 4:34
10. "Stardust" (Hoagy Carmichael, Mitchell Parish) – 4:11
11. "They Can't Take That Away from Me" (George Gershwin, Ira Gershwin) – 3:36

== Personnel ==
- Carmen McRae – vocals
- Kenny Napper – bass guitar
- Phil Seamen – drums
- Don Abney – piano
