= Carmen McRae (1971 album) =

Live album by Carmen McRae
- Released: July 1971
- Recorded: January 1, 1966; November 2, 1965
- Genre: Vocal jazz
- Label: Mainstream
- Producer: Bob Shad

Carmen McRae chronology
Just a Little Lovin' (1970)	Carmen McRae (1971)	Carmen's Gold (1971)

Professional ratings
Review scores
Source	Rating
Billboard	4/4 stars

Carmen McRae is a live album by American singer Carmen McRae, released in 1971 by Mainstream Records. All tracks were recorded during the concert on January 1, 1966, in San Francisco, the only exception was the song "My Ship Is Coming In", recorded on November 2, 1965.

For this album, McRae was nominated for the Grammy Award for Best Jazz Performance for the first time.

== Track listing ==
1. "Spring Can Really Hang You up the Most" (Fran Landesman, Tommy Wolf) – 6:15
2. "Bye Bye Blackbird" (Mort Dixon, Ray Henderson) – 4:46
3. "In My Solitude" (Duke Ellington, Ed DeLange, Irving Mills) – 3:19
4. "I'm Gonna Laugh You Right out of My Life" (Cy Coleman, Joe McCarthy) – 3:02
5. "Long Before I Knew You / Just in Time" (Adolph Green, Betty Comden, Jule Styne) – 6:02
6. "Round Midnight" (Bernie Hanighen, Cootie Williams, Thelonious Monk) – 4:42
7. "I Got It Bad and that Ain't Good" (Duke Ellington, Paul Francis Webster) – 3:16
8. "My Ship Is Coming In" (Ira Gershwin, Kurt Weill) – 3:14

== Personnel ==
- Carmen McRae — vocals
- Victor Sproles – bass
- Stuart Martin – drums
- Norman Simmons – piano

Credits are adapted from the album's liner notes.
