= Ned Miller (composer) =

British-American songwriter, composer, and actor (1899–1990)

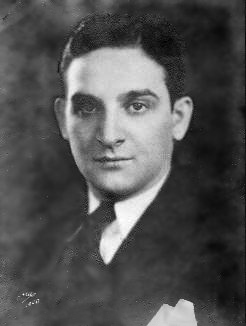

Background information
- Born: Nathan Miller; August 2, 1899; London, United Kingdom
- Died: January 26, 1990 (aged 90) Los Angeles, California, U.S.
- Genres: Blues, jazz, waltz
- Occupation(s): Composer, singer, actor, music publisher
- Years active: 1922–1990

Nathan "Ned" Miller (August 2, 1899 – January 26, 1990) was a British-born American songwriter, composer, music publisher, and actor who wrote the hit songs, "Why Should I Cry Over You", (a waltz ballad) in 1922, "Sunday" (a jazz standard) in 1926, and "Little Joe" (a jazz standard) in 1931. His music has been recorded by Frank Sinatra, Nat King Cole, Louis Armstrong, Al Jolson, Carmen McRae, Stan Getz, Peggy Lee, the Ink Spots, Johnny Mercer, Benny Goodman, Andy Williams, and many others. His music has also been featured in weekly TV programs and films. In 1982, Ned Miller was inducted into the American Society of Composers, Authors and Publishers (ASCAP) Golden Circle after having been a member for fifty years.

== Early life and career ==
Miller was born in London and emigrated to the United States with his family when he was a small child. At the age of seven, he quit school to support his brothers and sisters by singing on the street corner for pennies a day. In 1922, Ned Miller moved to Chicago and joined with Jack Benny on the vaudeville circuit where Benny included him in his acts. From that time on, they became lifelong friends often collaborating on television shows, TV specials, and even musical compositions.

== Career ==
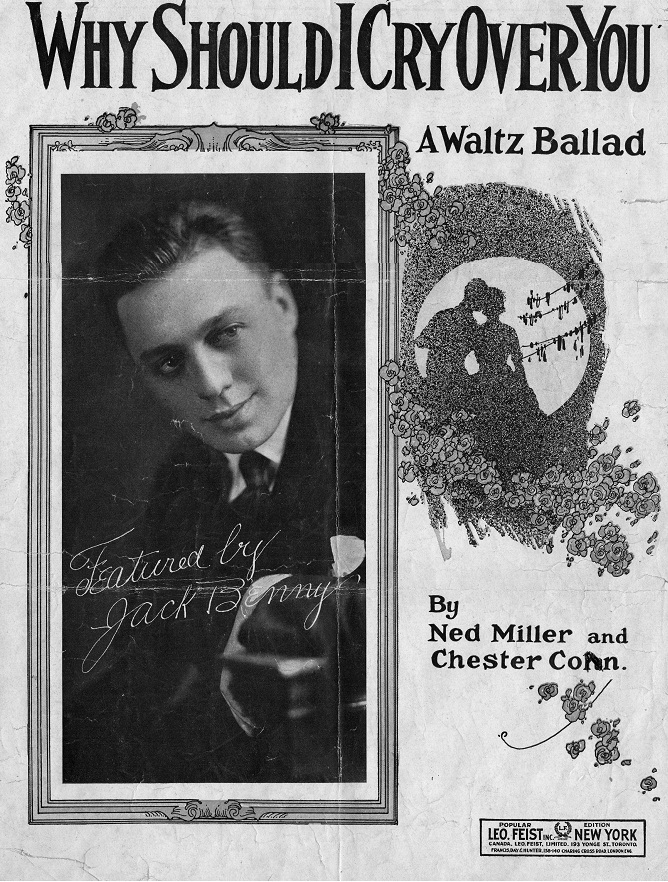
Ned Miller Sheet Music Featuring Jack Benny

=== Composer ===
Based on his success in vaudeville, Miller began writing and publishing his music in the 1920s and became part of the Chicago jazz sounds and Tin Pan Alley. Before long, his songs were recorded by Victor Records (acquired by RCA Victor), the Virginians' "Why Should I Cry Over You?" in 1922, the Paul Whiteman Orchestra in 1923, and the Jean Goldkette Orchestra in 1926. In 1926, when Jule Styne was only 17 years old and beginning his career, Styne collaborated with Ned Miller, Chester Conn, and Benny Krueger on "Sunday" which became an instant hit and the first best-selling song for Styne. "Sunday" also became a parlor song, popularly sung by friends and family gathering around the piano for entertainment. Art Tatum included the song in a collection of his Parlor Songs. Al Jolson liked the song so much that he helped promote it. "Sunday" later became the theme song for the 1940s radio show of husband and wife team Alice Faye and Phil Harris.The song charted three times in 1927. Cliff Edwards (Ukulele Ike) took it to number three: Gene Austin (the "Voice of the Southland") took it to number 11 accompanied by pianist Abel Baer; and the vaudeville singing trio, the Keller Sisters and Lynch, recorded "Sunday" with the Jean Goldkette Orchestra where their version rose to number 11. "Sunday," has been performed regularly by a wide variety of noted jazz musicians. Many saxophonists have recorded it: Lester Young, Lee Konitz, and John Coltrane; Ben Webster on two occasions with fellow saxists Gerry Mulligan and Don Byas; Harry Allen with the John Pizzarelli Trio; and Stan Getz with the Oscar Peterson Trio. Other recordings include vibraphonist Red Norvo; trumpeter Sweets Edison; pianists Fats Waller and Hank Jones; and vocalists Maxine Sullivan, Johnny Hartman, Carmen McRae, June Christy, Nat King Cole, Carol Sloane and the Buddy Rich Ensemble. The multi-Grammy winning vocal quartet, The Manhattan Transfer, closed each episode of their weekly television variety show with the song, "Sunday."

In addition to "Sunday" and "Why Should I Cry Over You", Mr. Miller wrote hundreds of songs during his lifetime, including "Heartbreaker" (©1933), "Kentucky Lullaby", "Don't Mind The Rain", "What Will You Do", "You Don't Like It—Not Much", "Sicilian Tarantella", and many others.

Jack Benny also collaborated with Ned Miller on several compositions and recordings. For example, in 1922, Jack Benny recorded "Why Should I Cry Over You" in 1922 and co-wrote the song, "You're Sweet That Way", in 1962. In 1976, Irving Fein, Jack Benny's manager and producer, interviewed Mr. Miller for the book Jack Benny: an Intimate Portrait, where he described their lifelong friendship and artistic collaborations.

=== Actor ===
In addition to his music, Miller also worked for years with Jack Benny on The Jack Benny Program, television appearances, commercials, and NBC specials. He appeared in 22 episodes of The Jack Benny Program between 1961–1965 and often served as a stand-in for blocking shots due to a similarity in appearance. The show earned 20 Emmy nominations during its run and won seven, including two for Benny himself and one for Best Comedy Series.

Episode	Role	Release date
Death Row Sketch	Stage Manager	12 February 1961
Jack Goes to Las Vegas	Bellboy	19 March 1961
Jack Takes the Stewarts to a Play	Ned Miller	12 November 1961
The Golf Show	Ned Miller	26 November 1961
Jack Goes to Cafeteria	Ned Miller	10 December 1961
Jack Writes Song	Locksmith's Assistant	17 December 1961
The Phil Silvers Show	Ned Miller	9 October 1962
Jack Is Kidnapped	Policeman	12 March 1963
Robinson Crusoe Sketch	Ned Miller	19 November 1963
The Nat King Cole Show	Autograph Hound	21 January 1964
The Bobby Darin Show	Ned Miller	28 January 1964
Jack Is Boxing Manager	Ned Miller	17 March 1964
The Lucille Ball Show	Town Crier	2 October 1964
Jungle Sketch	Ned Miller	6 November 1964
Jack Loses a Raffle	Pete	13 November 1964
The Wayne Newton Show	Orchestra Leader	4 December 1964
Jack Goes to the Monkey's House	Ned Miller	5 February 1965
The Stradivarius Story	Ned Miller	12 February 1965
Jack Joins Acrobats	Villager	19 February 1965
Jack Finds a Double	Janitor	12 March 1965
Dennis Opens a Bank Account	Guard	26 March 1965
Jack Has Dog Trouble	Customer	9 April 1965

== Legacy ==
Long after retirement, Miller continued to write music for his family, friends, and neighbors. Since Miller's death (at 90 years of age), his music catalog has been actively maintained by a granddaughter, Jennifer Gerhold, Ph.D., and his songs continue to be played all over the world.
