= Frank Severino =

American jazz drummer (1936–1987)

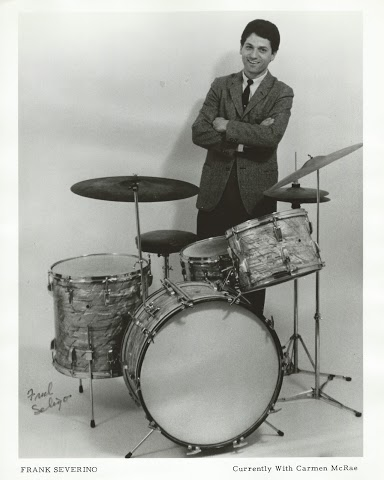
Frank Severino

Frank Severino (born Frank J. Severino June 2, 1936 – October 5, 1987) was an American jazz drummer.

He played with Warne Marsh during 1975. In the 1970s he was also part of guitarist Joe Pass's trio. He was based in Los Angeles at this time; critic Ted Panken described him and Donald Bailey as "first-call drummers" of the area. Severino appeared on Clark Terry's Memories of Duke album.

Taking after his father, Severino and Shelly Manne invented a drum with quick changeable batter heads.

== Discography ==
- 1965 Woman Talk, Carmen McRae
- 1965 "Live" and Wailing, Carmen McRae
- 1965 Billie Holiday Revisited, Billie Holiday
- 1965 Red Soul, Red Holloway
- 1967 Les Is More, Les McCann
- 1973 It Takes a Whole Lot of Human Feeling, Carmen McRae
- 1974 Live at Donte's Joe Pass
- 1978 Soul Believer, Milt Jackson
- 1979 Bags' Bag, Milt Jackson
- 1980 Memories of Duke, Clark Terry
- 1980 Mello' as a Cello, Al Viola
- 1981 My Desiree, Tommy Tedesco
- 1983 Coming Out, Johnny O'Neal
- 1985 The River, Monty Alexander
- 1992 Fine Fretted Friend, Tommy Tedesco
- 1992 My Flame, Jim Nichols
- 1992 Velvet Soul, Carmen McRae
- 1994 Maybeck Recital Hall Series Vol. 40, Monty Alexander
- 1995 I Was Born in Love with You, Denise Jannah
- 1997 Guitar Virtuoso, Joe Pass
- 1998 How's Your Mother?, Les McCann
- 2000 Ballad Essentials, Monty Alexander
- 2000 Les Incontournables, Clark Terry
- 2000 Live in Las Vegas 1962, Warne Marsh
- 2000 Ms. Jazz, Carmen McRae
- 2000 Resonance, Joe Pass
- 2003 I'll Never Be the Same, Marilena Paradisi
- 2005 Live at the Iridium, Monty Alexander
- 2006 Look at Me Now!, Laika Fatien
- 2010 Second Chance, Irene Kral
