= Two for the Road (Carmen McRae and George Shearing album) =

Studio album by Carmen McRae, George Shearing
- Released: 1980
- Recorded: June 1980
- Genre: Vocal jazz
- Length: 39:07
- Label: Concord
- Producer: Carl Jefferson

George Shearing chronology
Blues Alley Jazz (1979)	Two for the Road (1980)	In Concert at the Pavilion (1980)

Carmen McRae chronology
I'm Coming Home Again (1980)	Two for the Road (1980)	Recorded Live at Bubba's (1981)

Professional ratings
Review scores
Source	Rating
AllMusic	4/5 stars
The Penguin Guide to Jazz Recordings	3/4 stars
The Rolling Stone Jazz Record Guide	5/5 stars

Two for the Road is a 1980 album by the jazz singer Carmen McRae and the jazz pianist George Shearing.

== Track listing ==
1. "I Don't Stand a Ghost of a Chance with You" (Bing Crosby, Ned Washington, Victor Young) – 3:41
2. "You're All I Need" (Walter Jurmann, Gus Kahn, Bronislaw Kaper) – 3:15
3. "Gentleman Friend" (Arnold B. Horwitt, Richard Lewine) – 4:11
4. "More Than You Know" (Edward Eliscu, Billy Rose, Vincent Youmans) – 4:33
5. "Cloudy Morning" (Marvin Fisher, Joseph McCarthy) – 2:55
6. "Too Late Now" (Burton Lane, Alan Jay Lerner) – 5:02
7. "If I Should Lose You" (Ralph Rainger, Leo Robin) – 2:16
8. "Ghost of Yesterday" (Arthur Herzog, Jr., Irene Kitchings) – 4:51
9. "What Is There to Say?" (Vernon Duke, Yip Harburg) – 4:54
10. "Two for the Road" (Leslie Bricusse, Henry Mancini) – 3:29

== Personnel ==
=== Performance ===
- Carmen McRae – vocals
- George Shearing – piano, vocals on "Two for the Road"
