= You're Lookin' at Me (A Collection of Nat King Cole Songs) =

Studio album by Carmen McRae
- Released: 1983
- Recorded: November 1983
- Studio: Coast Recorders, San Francisco, California, US
- Genre: Vocal jazz
- Length: 36 minutes
- Label: Concord
- Producer: Donald Bailey

Carmen McRae chronology
Heat Wave (1982)	You're Lookin' at Me (A Collection of Nat King Cole Songs) (1983)	Any Old Time (1986)

You're Lookin' at Me (A Collection of Nat King Cole Songs) is a 1983 studio album by Carmen McRae, recorded in tribute to Nat King Cole.

The album features guitarist John Collins, a former member of Nat King Coles' trio.

== Reception ==
Professional ratings
Review scores
Source	Rating
AllMusic	4/5 stars

Allmusic awarded the album four stars and reviewer Scott Yanow said that "Carmen McRae's tribute to Nat King Cole (which predated the late-'80s revival of Cole's music) has its strong and weak points. She wisely adds Cole's former guitarist John Collins to her regular trio and picked some fine material...However McRae's phrasing is much different than Cole's and why did she sing "Sweet Lorraine" without changing any of the words? Despite those reservations, this set has enough strong moments to justify its purchase".

== Track listing ==
1. "I'm an Errand Girl for Rhythm" (Nat King Cole) – 3:33
2. "Beautiful Moons Ago" (Cole, Oscar Moore) – 3:1
3. "The Frim Fram Sauce" (Redd Evans, Joe Ricardel) – 3:58
4. "Come in Out of the Rain" (Bob Russell, Carl Sigman, Rupert Wates) – 3:12
5. "How Does It Feel?" (Marvin Fisher, Roy Alfred) – 4:04
6. "If I Had You" (Jimmy Campbell, Irving King) – 3:49
7. "I Can't See for Looking" (Nadine Robinson, Dok Stanford) – 3:29
8. "Sweet Lorraine" (Cliff Burwell, Mitchell Parish) – 3:34
9. "You're Looking at Me" (Bobby Troup) – 4:12
10. "Just You, Just Me" (Jesse Greer, Raymond Klages) – 3:57

== Personnel ==
- Carmen McRae – vocals
- Marshall Otwell – piano
- John Collins – guitar
- John Leftwich – double bass
- Donald Bailey – drums

Production

- Donald Bailey – producer
- Phil Edwards – engineer
- John S. Wilson – liner notes
