= I Am Music (Carmen McRae album) =

Studio album by Carmen McRae
- Released: July 1975
- Recorded: April 1975
- Studio: United Western Recorders, Los Angeles
- Genre: Jazz; soul; pop
- Length: 43:39
- Label: Blue Note
- Producer: Roger Kellaway

Carmen McRae chronology
Live and Doin' It (1974)	I Am Music (1975)	Velvet Soul (1975)

I Am Music is a studio album by American singer Carmen McRae, released in 1975. It was her first release on the new Blue Note Records label. The album was produced by Roger Kellaway.

== Critical reception ==
Professional ratings
Review scores
Source	Rating
AllMusic	1.5/5 stars
The Encyclopedia of Popular Music	3/5 stars

In a review by Billboard magazine, they wrote that producer Roger Kellaway paid tribute to McRae's ability to handle words with warmth and radiance, as well as Carmen touches nerve endings and sparkles in a program of songs that people need. The Cash Box reviewer noted: "Carmen McRae s voice is the voice of a dozen musical worlds. Her vocals flow as the tide, in and out of music of ease and simple thoughts. On I Am Music it is these vocals, when combined with a lilting instrumental backing, that add up to an all together enjoyable listen." A retrospective review by Music Week magazine called the album a "rare gem" and also stated that "the exquisite phrasing and timing provided the perfect backdrop for a collection of original songs."

== Track listing ==
1. "A Letter for Anna-Lee" (Bernard Ighner) – 5:01
2. "The Trouble with Hello Is Goodbye" (Alan Bergman, Marilyn Bergman, Dave Grusin) – 3:45
3. "Faraway Forever" (Alan Bergman, Marilyn Bergman, Quincy Jones) – 3:21
4. "I Ain't Here" (Jerry Leiber, Mike Stoller) – 3:28
5. "You Know Who You Are" (Bernard Ighner) – 5:19
6. "I Have the Feeling I've Been Here Before" (Alan Bergman, Marilyn Bergman, Roger Kellaway) – 5:56
7. "Who Gave You Permission" (Alan Bergman, Marilyn Bergman, Billy Goldenberg) – 3:14
8. "Like a Lover" (Alan Bergman, Marilyn Bergman, Dori Caymmi, Nelson Motta) – 5:57
9. "I Never Lied to You" (Gelsa Palao) – 3:19
10. "I Am Music" (Gelsa Palao) – 4:19

== Personnel ==
- Carmen McRae – vocals
- Dave Grusin – arrangement, orchestration, conductor (1), electric piano (1, 8), synthesizer (1, 8)
- Roger Kellaway – arrangement, orchestration, conductor (2–6, 9, 10), piano (4, 5), producer
- Byron Olson – arrangement, orchestration, conductor (7)
- The Morgan Ames Singers – backing vocals
- John Gianelli – bass guitar
- Ed Lustgarten – cello
- Spider Webb – drums (1, 8)
- John Guerin – drums (2–7, 9, 10)
- George Butler – executive producer
- Dennis Budimir – guitar
- Frank Collett – keyboards
- Wally Traugott – mastering
- Emil Richards – percussion
- Ian Underwood – programming
- Matt Hyde – recording, mixing
- Alan Harshman – viola
- Erno Neufeld – violin
- Gerri Vinci – violin

Credits are adapted from the album's liner notes.

== Charts ==
Chart performance for I Am Music
Chart (1975)	Peak position
US Best Selling Jazz LP's (Billboard)	22
US Soul LP's (Billboard)	56
