= Live and Doin' It =

Live album by Carmen McRae
- Released: 1974
- Recorded: 1965
- Genre: Vocal jazz
- Length: 30:13
- Label: Mainstream
- Producer: Bob Shad

Carmen McRae chronology
As Time Goes By: Live at the Dug (1974)	Live and Doin' It (1974)	I Am Music (1975)

Live and Doin' It is a live album by American singer Carmen McRae, recorded in 1965 in San Francisco with the participation of her trio, which included pianist Norman Simmons, drummer Stu Martin and bassist Victor Sproles. The album was released only nine years later, in 1974, by Mainstream Records.

== Critical reception ==
Professional ratings
Review scores
Source	Rating
AllMusic	3/5 stars

Music critic Will Friedwald noted that this is first-class concert material.

== Track listing ==
1. "Guess Who I Saw Today" (Elisse Boyd, Murray Grand) – 3:33
2. "That's Why the Lady Is a Tramp" (Lorenz Hart, Richard Rodgers) – 1:42
3. "My Ship Has Sailed" (Ira Gershwin, Kurt Weill) – 3:30
4. "No Where" (Joe Mooney) – 3:07
5. "Guess I'll Hang My Tears out to Dry" (Jule Styne, Sammy Cahn) – 4:51
6. "Sleeping Bee" (Harold Arlen, Truman Capote) – 1:50
7. "Meaning of the Blues" (Bobby Troup, Leah Worth) – 3:13
8. "I Only Have Eyes for You" (Al Dubin, Harry Warren) – 3:07
9. "Trouble Is a Man" (Alec Wilder) – 3:34
10. "Quiet Nights" (Antônio Carlos Jobim, Gene Lees) – 2:21

== Personnel ==
- Carmen McRae – vocals
- Victor Sproles – bass
- Stu Martin – drums
- Norman Simmons – piano

Credits are adapted from the album's liner notes.
