= Any Old Time (album) =

Studio album by Carmen McRae
- Released: 1986
- Recorded: June 23, 1986
- Venue: New York
- Studio: Clinton Studio
- Genre: Vocal jazz
- Length: 1:00:59
- Label: Denon
- Producer: Tom Ueno

Carmen McRae chronology
You're Lookin' at Me (A Collection of Nat King Cole Songs) (1984)	Any Old Time (1986)	The Carmen McRae-Betty Carter Duets (1988)

Any Old Time is a 1986 studio album by Carmen McRae, featuring the tenor saxophonist Clifford Jordan. McRae was nominated for the Grammy Award for Best Jazz Vocal Performance, Female at the 30th Annual Grammy Awards for her performance on this album.

== Reception ==
Professional ratings
Review scores
Source	Rating
Allmusic	4/5 stars

Reviewing the album for AllMusic, Scott Yanow wrote that "McRae is heard in prime form performing a variety of top standards...Although recorded in the studio, this excellent outing gives listeners a good idea of how Carmen McRae sounded live. Well worth searching for".

== Track listing ==
1. "Tulip or Turnip" (Duke Ellington, Don George) – 4:37
2. "Old Devil Moon" (E.Y. "Yip" Harburg, Burton Lane) – 4:20
3. "Have You Met Miss Jones?" (Lorenz Hart, Richard Rodgers) – 5:21
4. "Love Me Tender" (Vera Matson, Elvis Presley) – 5:57
5. "I Hear Music" (Burton Lane, Frank Loesser) – 4:49
6. "This is Always" (Mack Gordon, Harry Warren) – 5:05
7. "Body and Soul" (Frank Eyton, Johnny Green, Edward Heyman, Robert Sour) – 6:31
8. "Prelude to a Kiss" (Ellington, Irving Gordon, Irving Mills) – 5:25
9. "Mean to Me" (Fred E. Ahlert, Roy Turk) – 4:23
10. "Any Old Time" (Artie Shaw) – 3:02
11. "It Could Happen to You" (Johnny Burke, Jimmy Van Heusen) – 2:23
12. "I'm Glad There Is You" (Jimmy Dorsey, Paul Mertz) – 3:52
13. "Billie's Blues" (Billie Holiday) – 5:14

== Personnel ==
- Carmen McRae – vocals, piano
- Clifford Jordan – tenor saxophone
- John Collins – guitar
- Eric Gunnison – piano
- Scott Colley – double bass
- Mark Pulice – drums

Performance

- Haruo Koguchi – art direction
- Joe Martin, Ed Rak – engineer
- Sonny Lester – executive producer
- Hiraku Aoki – liner notes
- Hiroshi Gotoh – mixing
- Shigeru Uchiyama – photography
- Tom Ueno – producer
