= Heat Wave (Cal Tjader and Carmen McRae album) =

Studio album by Cal Tjader and Carmen McRae
- Released: January 1982
- Recorded: Coast Recorders, San Francisco, California, US
- Genre: Latin jazz, vocal jazz
- Length: 40:50
- Label: Concord Jazz; CJ-189 (12" LP); CCD-4189-2 (CD)
- Producer: Carl Jefferson

Cal Tjader chronology
A fuego vivo (1981)	Heat Wave (1982)	Good Vibes (1984)

Carmen McRae chronology
Recorded Live at Bubba's (1981)	Heat Wave (1982)	You're Looking at Me (1984)

Heat Wave is a 1982 studio album by vibraphonist Cal Tjader and jazz singer Carmen McRae. Tjader died four months after the completion of Heat Wave, it was his final recording.

The album was arranged by pianists Mark Levine and Marshall Otwell. McRae and Tjader did not get on well during the recording, and Tjader later overdubbed his parts without McRae present. McRae chose to sing "Besame Mucho" in its original Spanish language lyrics, and Willie Bobo helped her with the pronunciation.

Heat Wave peaked at 25 on Billboard's Jazz Albums chart.

== Reception ==
Professional ratings
Review scores
Source	Rating
AllMusic	2.5/5 stars
The Penguin Guide to Jazz Recordings	2.5/4 stars
The Rolling Stone Jazz Record Guide	3/5 stars

AllMusic awarded the album two and a half stars and reviewer Scott Yanow said that "the potentially exciting combination does not really come off that well...The musicians had little to do. McRae sounds OK in the Latin setting, but does not uplift the diverse material...and the effort overall is somewhat forgettable and disappointing".

== Track listing ==
1. "Heat Wave" (Irving Berlin) – 3:07
2. "All in Love Is Fair" (Stevie Wonder) – 4:27
3. "Besame Mucho" (Sunny Skylar, Consuelo Velázquez) – 5:26
4. "Evil Ways" (Sonny Henry) – 5:15
5. "Do Nothin' Till You Hear from Me" (Duke Ellington, Bob Russell) – 3:12
6. "Love" (Ralph Blane, Hugh Martin) – 3:06
7. "Upside Down (Flor de Lis)" (Djavan, Regina Wernech) – 4:33
8. "The Visit" (Ivan Lins, Vítor Martins, Wernech) – 4:13
9. "Speak Low" (Ogden Nash, Kurt Weill) – 4:51
10. "Don't You Worry 'Bout a Thing" (Wonder) – 3:42

== Personnel ==
Performance

- Cal Tjader – vibraphone
- Carmen McRae – vocals
- Marshall Otwell – piano, arranger
- Mark Levine – piano, arranger
- Rob Fisher – bass
- Vince Lateano – drums
- Poncho Sanchez – congas, percussion
- Ramon Banda – percussion, timbales
- Al Bent – trombone
- Mike Heathman – trombone

Production

- Phil Edwards – engineer
- Leonard Feather – liner notes
- Carl Jefferson – producer
