= Can't Hide Love (album) =

Studio album by Carmen McRae
- Released: 1976
- Recorded: May 3–12, 1976
- Genre: Vocal jazz
- Length: 40:46
- Label: Blue Note
- Producer: Dale Oehler

Carmen McRae chronology
November Girl (1975)	Can't Hide Love (1976)	At the Great American Music Hall (1977)

Can't Hide Love is a 1976 album by Carmen McRae, this was her third and last album to be released on Blue Note Records.

== Reception ==
Professional ratings
Review scores
Source	Rating
Allmusic	2/5 stars

In his review of the album for Allmusic, Scott Yanow described it as "...the type of session that killed Blue Note the first time around." adding that McRae "gamely tries to interpret unsuitable and inferior pop tunes ("The Man I Love" and "A Child Is Born" are the only exceptions) and is backed by an all-star but faceless orchestra that is given nothing to do. ...The trumpet section...is not given a single solo. The title cut is quite ludicrous and songs such as "Only Women Bleed" and "I Wish You Well" do not fit McRae's style at all."

== Track listing ==
1. "Can't Hide Love" (Skip Scarborough) – 3:53
2. "The Man I Love" (George Gershwin, Ira Gershwin) – 4:14
3. "Only Women Bleed" (Alice Cooper, Dick Wagner) – 4:58
4. "I Wish You Well" (Bill Withers) – 3:16
5. "All by Myself" (Eric Carmen) – 6:00
6. "Music" (James Taylor) – 3:29
7. "Lost Up in Loving You" (Kenny Rankin, Yvonne Rankin, William "Smitty" Smith) – 4:37
8. "You're Everything" (Chick Corea, Neville Potter) – 2:48
9. "Would You Believe?" (Randy California, Cy Coleman, James Lipton) – 4:07
10. "A Child Is Born" (Thad Jones) – 3:24

== Personnel ==
- Carmen McRae – vocals
- Don Menza, Jerome Richardson – saxophone
- Blue Mitchell, Bobby Shew – trumpet
- David Frisina, Gerald Vinci – violin
- Artie Kane – piano
- Marshall Otwell – keyboards, piano, electric piano
- Dave Grusin, Joe Sample – keyboards
- Ian Underwood – synthesizer
- Dennis Budimir, Larry Carlton – guitar
- Chuck Berghofer, Joe Mondragon – double bass
- Wilton Felder – bass guitar
- Harvey Mason – drums
- Larry Bunker, Victor Feldman – percussion
- Lanny Morgan, Bill Green, Harry Klee, Abe Most, Bill Perkins, Pete Christlieb, Jack Nimitz, Ernie Watts – saxophone
- Al Aarons, Oscar Brashear, Buddy Childers, Snooky Young – trumpet
- George Bohanon, Lew McCreary, Grover Mitchell, Kenny Shroyer, Maurice Spears, Ernie Tack – trombone
- Guildhall String Ensemble – strings

Production

- Dale Oehler – producer
- Hank Cicalo – engineer
