= Chester Conn =

American composer and music publisher

Chester Conn (né Master Chester Cohn; April 14, 1894 – April 4, 1973) was an American composer of popular music, as well as a music publisher.

== Early life and career ==
Chester was born in San Francisco, California to David Cohn and Minnie (née Newman; 1871–1946). At an early age, Chester was raised by his mother, who had become a widow sometime before 1900. In 1918, Cohn was working for Broadway Music Corp (Note: Broadway Music Corporation is a privately held American publisher of popular music that was founded in 1913 by Will Von Tilzer (né William U. Gumbinsky; surname later changed to Gumm; 1882–1952) (Albert's brother), and headed by him for thirty-nine years until his death in 1952. Around 1960, after some shuffling among new owners, the corporation was restructured and became the imprint of the London firm Kassner Music for North America, which endures today. Kassner Music, founded by Edward Kassner (1920–1996), maintains the Broadway Music Corporation as a New York entity and a subsidiary.) in New York. In 1922, Cohn was working for Leo Feist, Inc., in its Chicago office. In 1937, Conn co-founded the New York music publishing of Bregman, Vocco & Conn, Inc. ("BVC"). The other name partners were Jack Bregman (né Joseph Bregman; 1901–1967) and Rocco Vocco (1887–1960). Chester Conn's only child, a son, Jack D. Conn (1926–1966), had been an executive at BVC. Given that Bregman, Vocco, and Jack Conn all predeceased Chester, Chester sold the firm in May 1967 to 20th Century Fox for 4.5 million dollars in cash.

He died in Flushing, Queens.

== Selected works ==
Conn's best-known song is the jazz standard "Sunday" (Jule Styne, Ned Miller, Benny Krueger, lyrics; ©1926). (Note: Part 3, New Series, Vol. 21, Part 2, Last Half of 1926, Nos. 7–12 (1927), pg. 1028 "Sunday" Jule Styne Ned Miller Benny Krueger © 20 October 1926; E651091) The Jazz Discography Online, as of June 2017, lists 497 recording sessions for "Sunday" – from 1926 to 2015. Other songs include "My Suppressed Desire" (Ned Miller, lyrics; ©1928), "Outside of Heaven" (Sammy Gallop, lyrics; ©1952), "Just Like Before" (co-composed with Bill Huston and Sammy Gallop; ©1953), (Note: Third Series, Vol. 7, Part 5B, July–December 1953, No. 2 (1954), pg. 657 "Just Like Before" William D. Huston (w&m) Bregman, Vocco & Conn, Inc. © 17 July 1953; EU323884) (Note: Third Series, Vol. 8, Part 5B, July–December 1954, No. 2 (1955), pg. 532 "Just Like Before" Bill Huston (w&m) Sammy Gallop (w&m) Chester Conn (w&m) Bregman, Vocco & Conn, Inc. © 23 July 1954; EU365574) "I Don't Think You Love Me Anymore" (Sammy Gallop, lyrics; ©1953), (Note: Third Series, Vol. 7, Part 5B, July–December 1953, No. 2 (1954), pg. 611 "I Don't Think You Love Me Any More" Sammy Gallop (words) Chester Conn (music) Bregman, Vocco & Conn, Inc. © 4 December 1953; EU340162) "Make Her Mine" (Sammy Gallop, lyrics; ©1954), (Note: Third Series, Vol. 8, Part 5A, January–June 1954, No. 1 (1954), pg. 52 "Make Her Mine" Sammy Gallop (words) Chester Conn (music) Bregman, Vocco & Conn, Inc. © 1 June 1954; EP80952) "Forgive My Heart" (Sammy Gallop, lyrics; ©1955), "Night Lights" (Sammy Gallop, co-composer; ©1956), "It's None of My Affair" (Sam Gallop, lyrics; ©1957), "Time To Go Home" (Sam Gallop, lyrics; ©1958), (Note: Third Series, Vol. 12, Part 5, No. 1, January–June 1958 (1959), pg. 551 "Time To Go Home" Sammy Gallop (words) Chester Conn (music) Bregman, Vocco & Conn, Inc. © 26 February 1958; EU513614) "Blue Waltz (La Valse Bleue)" (1960), "Anything I Do" (co-composed with George Douglas; ©1965), (Note: Third Series, Vol. 19, Part 5, No. 1, January–June 1965 (1967), pg. 551 "Anything I Do" George Douglas (w&m) Chester Conn (w&m) Bregman, Vocco, & Conn, Inc. © 8 March 1965; EU870580) "Oh Well", and "Because You Lied."

=== Other works ===
- "What'll You Do?"

Chester Cohn (words)
Ernie Erdman (music)
Broadway Music Corp., New York
© 22 November 1921; E523162

- "You Don't Like It, Not Much"

Ned Miller
Art Kahn
Chester Cohn
Leo Feist, Inc., New York
© 25 June 1927; E665996
(band arrangement by Onofrio Sciacca)

- "Why Should I Cry Over You"

Chester Conn (w&m)
Ned Miller (w&m)
Leo Feist, Inc.
© 14 April 1922; E534774
© 19 May 1922; 538621
© 7 July 1922; E542251
(arrangement by Frank Edward Barry; 1883–1937 – staff arranger for Leo Feist)
© 11 September 1922; E543788
(arrangement by Frank Edward Barry)
© 15 November 1922; E552081
(arrangement for ukulele by William J. Smith)
© 18 December 1922; E554461
(arrangement for male voices by Alfred John Doyle, Sr.; 1874–1929)
OCLC 11272996, 20597698, 703630663
Sheet music, in pdf (public domain), courtesy University of Mississippi

- "Crying for You"

Chester Cohn (music)
Ned Miller (words)
Leo Feist, Inc., New York
© 22 November 1922; E549890
© 9 July 1923; E563681 (Alt. link)
© 24 November 1923; 555430
OCLC 861306193, 221554714

- "Don't Mind the Rain"

Ned Miller (w&m)
Chester Cohn (w&m)'
Leo Feist, Inc., New York
© 3 December 1923; E577690
OCLC 463913624, 61191541, 20597920
Sheet music, in pdf (public domain), courtesy York University

- "The Talk of the Town"

Gus Kahn (words)
Chester Conn (music)
Leo Feist, Inc., New York
© 17 December 1929; EU14672
© 31 December 1929; EP12355
OCLC 499085501

- "So Close to Me"

Wayne King (w&m)
Jerry Castillo (w&m)
Chester Cohn (w&m)
Leo Feist, Inc., New York
© 15 September 1931; EP25135

- "Sicilian Tarantella" (American song title)

"Fischiettando" (Italian song title)
G. Balsamo (Italian composer)
Ned Miller (words)
Chester Conn (words)
Triangle Music Corp., New York
© 16 May 1949; EP36995
OCLC 6608838

- "I'll Never Know Why"

Sammy Gallop (words)
Chester Conn (music)
Bregman, Vocco & Conn, Inc.
© 9 February 1951; EP52754
OCLC 279281654

- "Will o' the Wisp Romance"

Sammy Gallop (words)
Chester Conn (music)
Triangle Music Corp., New York
© 25 February 1953; EP69771

- "That's You"

Nelson Riddle (w&m)
Sammy Gallop (w&m)
Chester Conn (w&m)
Bregman, Vocco & Conn, Inc.
3 March 1960; EU616719

- "The Right Thing To Say"

Sammy Gallop (words)
Chester Conn (music)
Bregman, Vocco & Conn, Inc.
© 15 February 1962; EU706926
OCLC 499059338

== Performers of Conn's work ==
The performers who have recorded Conn's songs include Nat King Cole, John Coltrane, Eddie Fisher, Coleman Hawkins, Milt Jackson, Carmen McRae, Gerry Mulligan, Buddy Rich, Frank Sinatra, Clark Terry, and Ben Webster, Lester Young.

== Death ==
Chester Conn died of a heart attack on April 4, 1973 while at the Aqueduct Racetrack. Conn was survived by his wife, Grace (née Grace Belle Goodman; 1885–1978), whom he married on May 1, 1921, in Chicago. He was also survived by his daughter-in-law, Ella Conn (née Raffaella Nardino; 1928–2010), and a grandson, Brian Conn (born 1961). Ella Conn (Chester's daughter-in-law) was an aunt to Gary Nardino (1935-1998), a notable Hollywood TV and film director, producer, and industry executive.
