= For Once in My Life (Carmen McRae album) =

Studio album by Carmen McRae
- Released: July 1967
- Recorded: April 10–12, 1967
- Studio: Olympic Studios, London
- Genre: Vocal jazz; pop
- Label: Atlantic
- Producer: Joel Dorn; Nesuhi Ertegun

Carmen McRae chronology
Alfie (1966)	For Once in My Life (1967)	This Is Carmen McRae (1967)

For Once in My Life is a 1967 studio album by jazz singer Carmen McRae, arranged and conducted by Johnny Keating and recorded in London at Olympic Studios. It was released on vinyl LP on Atlantic Records. The album consists of covers of modern popular songs by artists such as Burt Bacharach, Brian Wilson, the Beatles and Buffy Sainte-Marie.

== Critical reception ==
Professional ratings
Review scores
Source	Rating
AllMusic	4/5 stars
The Encyclopedia of Popular Music	3/5 stars
The Penguin Guide to Jazz	3/4 stars

The Billboard magazine review noted that McRae is following a new path, choosing a repertoire from the current pop catalog, and it works effectively, as well as that her performance skills are better than ever and this gives the first album for Atlantic a good chance to take off. From a review by Cash Box magazine: "Carmen McRae sings a selection of pop melodies which her fans are bound to take to their hearts. The artist’s tone is mellow and true, and she gives meaningful interpretation to the lyrics. A quality package indeed." Stereo Review reviewer Rex Reed stated that it was a wonderful listening experience, showcasing Carmen's voice in a better, more relaxed, more controlled way than he had ever heard.

Tim Sendra from AllMusic noted in a retrospective review that it may seem like it's just an attempt to jump on the pop scene, but McRae, with her not so pleasant voice, but a great interpretation of the songs, creates great tracks. Although, in his opinion, there is not much jazz here, McRae fans should not be put off by the songs or the era, because this is one of the best albums of the second half of her career.

== Track listing ==
1. "For Once in My Life" (Ron Miller, Orlando Murden) – 3:08
2. "Don't Talk" (Tony Asher, Brian Wilson) – 2:10
3. "Until It's Time for You to Go" (Buffy Sainte-Marie) – 3:03
4. "Got to Get You into My Life" (John Lennon, Paul McCartney) – 2:35
5. "Our Song" (Tony Clarke, Umberto Bindi, Nisa Califano) – 2:37
6. "Come Live with Me" (Johnny Keating, Leah Worth) – 3:11
7. "The Look of Love" (Burt Bacharach, Hal David) – 2:56
8. "It's Not Going That Way" (Johnny Keating, Leah Worth) – 2:37
9. "I Just Wasn't Made for These Times" (Tony Asher, Brian Wilson) – 2:57
10. "Worlds of Time" (George David Weiss) – 3:00
11. "Flying" (Carolyn Leigh, Mike Stoller) – 2:46

== Personnel ==
- Carmen McRae – vocals
- Joel Dorn – producer
- Nesuhi Ertegun – supervision
- Johnny Keating – arranger, conductor
- Loring Eutemey – cover design
- Fred Seligo – cover photography
