= Don't Explain (song) =

1946 single by Billie Holiday

Single by Billie Holiday
- B-side: "What Is This Thing Called Love?"
- Released: 1946
- Recorded: November 8, 1944
- Genre: Jazz
- Length: 2:53
- Label: Decca
- Songwriters: Billie Holiday, Arthur Herzog Jr.

Billie Holiday singles chronology
"Lover Man" (1945)	"Don't Explain" (1946)

"Don't Explain" is a song written by jazz singer Billie Holiday and Arthur Herzog Jr. It was Holiday's final song.

== Overview ==
In her 1956 autobiography, Holiday cites the infidelity of her first husband, Jimmy Monroe, as the inspiration for this song—specifically, an instance in which Monroe's woeful attempt to explain away lipstick on his collar elicits Holiday's response.

"I saw the lipstick. He saw I saw it and he started explaining and explaining. I could stand anything but that. Lying to me was worse than anything he could have done with any bitch. I cut him off, just like that. ‘Take a bath, man,’ I said, ‘don’t explain.’

That should have been the end of it. But that night stuck in my crop. I couldn’t forget it. The words ‘don’t explain, don’t explain’ kept going through my damn head. I had to get it out of my system some way, I guess. The more I thought about it, it changed from an ugly scene to a sad song. Soon I was singing phrases to myself. Suddenly I had a whole song.

I went downtown one night and sat down with Arthur Herzog; he played the tune over on the piano, wrote down the words, changing two or three phrases, softening it up just a little."

== Recording session ==
Session #52: New York City, November 8, 1944, Decca, Toots Camarata and His Orchestra, with Russ Case (trumpet), Hymie Schertzer, Jack Cressey (alto saxophone), Larry Binyon and Dave Harris (tenor saxophone), Dave Bowman (piano), Carl Kress (guitar), Haig Stephens (bass), George Wettling (drums), Billie Holiday (vocals), and six strings.

== Cover versions ==
- Helen Merrill – on her album Helen Merrill (1954)
- John Coltrane (1957)
- Abbey Lincoln – on her album That's Him! (1957)
- Charlie Byrd – on the album Byrd's Word! (1958)
- Wes Montgomery (1959)
- Anita O'Day – for her album Trav'lin' Light (1961)
- Dinah Washington – I Wanna Be Loved (1962)
- Dexter Gordon - on his A Swingin' Affair (1962)
- Nina Simone – in her album Let It All Out (1966)
- Carmen McRae – included in her album Woman Talk (1966)
- Lou Rawls – on his album Soulin' (1966)
- Diana Ross – for the album Lady Sings the Blues (1972)
- Natalie Cole – for her album Take a Look (1993)
- Gabrielle Goodman with Kevin Eubanks – on Travelin' Light (1993)
- Beth Hart and Joe Bonamassa - on their album Don't Explain (2011)
- Malia (2012)
- Xiu Xiu – Nina (2013)
- Nancy Kelly (2014)
- Cassandra Wilson - Coming Forth by Day (2015)

== Trivia ==
Lyrics from "Don't Explain" were sung by Carlo Marx (portrayed by actor Tom Sturridge) in the 2012 film adaptation by Walter Salles of the 1957 novel by Jack Kerouac, On the Road, which premiered at the Cannes Film Festival.
