= Sunday (Chester Conn song) =

Single by Jean Goldkette and His Orchestra
- A-side: "I'd Rather Be the Girl in Your Arms (Than the Girl in Your Dreams)"
- Published: October 20, 1926
- Released: December 3, 1926
- Recorded: October 15, 1926
- Genre: Jazz
- Length: 2:39
- Label: Victor
- Composer: Chester Conn
- Lyricists: Jule Styne, Bennie Krueger, Ned Miller

"Sunday" is a 1926 song written by Chester Conn, with lyrics by Jule Styne, Bennie Krueger, and Ned Miller, which has become a jazz standard recorded by many artists. The tune has been fitted out to various lyrics, but best known in the original version of British-American songwriter Jule Styne: "I'm blue every Monday, thinking over Sunday, that one day that I'm with you"

Early successful recordings in 1927 were made by Jean Goldkette and His Orchestra; Cliff Edwards; and Gene Austin.

The tune was the theme for The Phil Harris-Alice Faye Show, a comedy radio program which aired on Sundays on NBC for most of its run from 1948 to 1954.

== Other notable recordings ==
- Frank Sinatra - included in his album Swing Easy! (1954)
- Bing Crosby recorded the song in 1955 for use on his radio show and it was subsequently included in the box set The Bing Crosby CBS Radio Recordings (1954-56) issued by Mosaic Records (catalog MD7-245) in 2009.
- Pat Boone - for his album Howdy! (1956).
- Johnny Hartman - included in his album And I Thought About You (1959).
- Kay Starr (1956) and later for her album Kay Starr: Jazz Singer (1960)
- Al Martino - included in his album Swing Along with Al Martino (1959).
- Carmen McRae - included in the album The Great American Songbook (1972)
- Michael Feinstein and Jule Styne - for the album Michael Feinstein Sings the Jule Styne Songbook (1991).
