= The Carmen McRae – Betty Carter Duets =

1987 live album by Carmen McRae and Betty Carter

The Carmen McRae-Betty Carter Duets

Live album by Carmen McRae and Betty Carter
- Released: 1987
- Recorded: January 30–February 1, 1987, at the Great American Music Hall, San Francisco, CA
- Genre: Vocal jazz
- Length: 61:33 (re-issue)
- Label: American Music Hall Records
- Producer: Tom Bradshaw

Alternative cover
- Cover of the 1996 Verve reissue

Professional ratings
Review scores
Source	Rating
Allmusic	3.5/5 stars
Allmusic	(Re-issue)

The Carmen McRae-Betty Carter Duets is a 1987 live album of duets by the American jazz singers Betty Carter and Carmen McRae. Originally released on American Music Hall Records, it was reissued in 1996 by Verve under the title Duets: Live at the Great American Music Hall with three previously unreleased tracks by McRae alone.

== Track listing ==
1. "What's New?" (Johnny Burke, Bob Haggart) – 4:20
2. "Stolen Moments" (Oliver Nelson/Gail Fisher) – 3:36
3. "But Beautiful" (Burke, Jimmy Van Heusen) – 5:55
4. "Am I Blue?" (Harry Akst, Grant Clarke) – 6:45
5. "Glad to Be Unhappy"/"Where or When" (Richard Rodgers, Lorenz Hart)/(Rodgers, Hart) – 5:33
6. "Sometimes I'm Happy" (Irving Caesar, Clifford Grey, Vincent Youmans) – 7:54
7. "Isn't It Romantic?" (Rodgers, Hart) – 2:57
8. "Sophisticated Lady" (Duke Ellington, Irving Mills, Mitchell Parish) – 3:34
9. "It Don't Mean a Thing (If It Ain't Got That Swing)" (Ellington, Mills) – 6:10
10. "I Hear Music" (Burton Lane, Frank Loesser) – 2:52
11. "Love Dance" (Ivan Lins, Vitor Martins, Paul Williams) – 8:09
12. "Old Devil Moon" (Yip Harburg, Lane) – 3:48

Tracks 10–12 not included on original LP release.

== Personnel ==
- Betty Carter - vocals
- Carmen McRae - vocals, piano
- Eric Gunnison - piano
- Jim Hughart - double bass
- Winard Harper - drums
