= At the Great American Music Hall =

Live album by Carmen McRae
- Released: 1977
- Recorded: June 15–17, 1976
- Venue: The Great American Music Hall, San Francisco
- Genre: Vocal jazz
- Length: 1:20:54
- Label: Blue Note LA709H2
- Producer: George Butler

Carmen McRae chronology
Can't Hide Love (1976)	At the Great American Music Hall (1977)	I'm Coming Home Again (1980)

At the Great American Music Hall is a 1976 live album by Carmen McRae, recorded at the Great American Music Hall in San Francisco. McRae is joined on several tracks by the trumpeter Dizzy Gillespie, and backed by her jazz trio of pianist Marshall Otwell, bassist Ed Bennett, and drummer Joey Baron. McRae was nominated for the Grammy Award for Best Jazz Vocal Album at the 19th Annual Grammy Awards for her performance on this album.

== Reception ==
Professional ratings
Review scores
Source	Rating
Allmusic	4/5 stars

Reviewing the album for AllMusic, Stephen Cook wrote that McRae "Couched in that stellar Blue Note sound, McRae ranges far and wide on a set of standards...The whole recording is remarkable, for that matter...A must for McRae fans". Billboard described the album as an "Accompaniment is a bit skimpy with Diz Gillespie and three others but McRae's still-powerful pipes register effectively on standards.".

Joseph Vella interviewed McRae's trio for the Huffington Post on the occasion of the album's digital re-issue in 2014. Vella described the album as "...Carmen at her very best: singing jazz standards, ballads, the American songbook, popular songs of the day and some bossa nova to boot". Otwell said that "Working with Carmen I always felt like her choice of tunes was magical. I always felt that it was just so very special and I think the tunes on the album really do work. As I was listening to it, I loved it all." Baron said of Mcae's performance on "Old Folks" that "Carmen always sang it with such feeling. She gets to the essence of the song. Hearing her sing this makes me think of how she modeled respect across the age, race, gender, cultural and religious walls. That continues to inspire me.

== Track listing ==
1. "Them There Eyes" (Maceo Pinkard) – 2:03
2. "Paint Your Pretty Picture" (Bill Withers) – 6:27
3. "On Green Dolphin Street" (Bronisław Kaper, Ned Washington) – 3:24
4. "A Song for You" (Leon Russell) – 4:48
5. "On a Clear Day (You Can See Forever)" (Burton Lane, Alan Jay Lerner) – 4:27
6. "Miss Otis Regrets (She's Unable to Lunch Today)" (Cole Porter) – 6:02
7. "Too Close for Comfort" (Jerry Bock, Larry Holofcener, George David Weiss) – 4:07
8. "Old Folks" (Dedette Lee Hill, Willard Robison) – 4:47
9. "Time After Time" (Sammy Cahn, Jule Styne) – 3:04
10. "I'm Always Drunk in San Francisco" (Tommy Wolf) – 3:48
11. "Don't Misunderstand" (Gordon Parks) – 3:41
12. "A Beautiful Friendship" (Donald Kahn, Stanley Styne) – 4:04
13. "Star Eyes" (Gene Paul, Don Raye) – 3:02
14. "Dindi" (Antônio Carlos Jobim, Vinícius de Moraes, Norman Gimbel) – 4:36
15. "Never Let Me Go" (Ray Evans, Jay Livingston) – 3:14
16. "'Tain't Nobody's Bizness If I Do" (Porter Grainger, Everett Robbins) – 5:15
17. "Only Women Bleed" (Vincent Furnier, Dick Wagner) – 4:47
18. "No More Blues (Chega de Saudade)" (Jobim, de Moraes, Jesse Cavanaugh, Jon Hendricks) – 4:14
19. "The Folks Who Live on the Hill" (Oscar Hammerstein II, Jerome Kern) – 3:52

== Personnel ==
- Carmen McRae – vocals, piano
- Dizzy Gillespie – trumpet
- Marshall Otwell – piano
- Ed Bennett – double bass
- Joey Baron – drums, percussion
