= Haven't We Met? =

Studio album by Carmen McRae
- Released: 1965
- Recorded: February 2 & 3, 1965
- Genre: Vocal jazz
- Label: Mainstream

Carmen McRae chronology
Second to None (1964)	Haven't We Met? (1965)	Woman Talk (1966)

Professional ratings
Review scores
Source	Rating
AllMusic	3/5 stars
Billboard	4/4 stars
The Encyclopedia of Popular Music	3/5 stars

Haven't We Met? is a 1965 studio album by jazz singer Carmen McRae, arranged and conducted by Don Sebesky. It was recorded on February 2 & 3, 1965, and released on the Mainstream Records label.

== Track listing ==
1. "Life Is Just a Bowl of Cherries" (Lew Brown, Ray Henderson) – 2:50
2. "Who Can I Turn To?" (Leslie Bricusse, Anthony Newley) – 3:00
3. "He Loves Me" (Jerry Bock, Sheldon Harnick) – 2:07
4. "Sweet Georgia Brown" (Ben Bernie, Kenneth Casey, Maceo Pinkard) – 3:15
5. "Don't Ever Leave Me" (Oscar Hammerstein II, Jerome Kern) – 2:37
6. "Gentlemen Friend" (Arnold Horwitt, Richard Lewine) – 2:18
7. "Haven't We Met?" (Kenny Rankin, Ruth Batchelor) – 2:24
8. "It Shouldn't Happen to a Dream" (Don George, Duke Ellington, Johnny Hodges) – 2:59
9. "Limehouse Blues" (Douglas Furber, Phillip Braham) – 2:59
10. "I'm Foolin' Myself" (Jack Lawrence, Peter Tinturin) – 3:00
11. "Love Is a Night-Time Thing" (Bob Haymes) – 2:37
12. "Fools and Lovers" (Cliff Adams, Veronica Barnes) – 2:25

== Personnel ==
Credits are adapted from the album's liner notes.

- Carmen McRae – vocals
- Don Sebesky – arrangement
- Jack Lonshein – artwork
- Arthur Davis, Richard Davis – bass
- Paul Faulise, Tony Studd – bass trombone
- Anthony Sophos, Charles McCracken, George Ricci, Harvey Shapiro – cello
- Ed Shaughnessy, Mel Lewis – drums
- Barry Galbraith – electric guitar, classical guitar
- Bob Arnold – engineering
- Earl Chapin, Jimmy Buffington, Ray Alonge, Dick Berg – French horn
- Margaret Ross – harp
- Hal Diepold – mastering
- Doug Allan, Phil Kraus – percussion
- Norman Simmons – piano
- Charles Mariano, Leon Cohen, Phil Bodner, Stan Webb – tenor saxophone, alto saxophone, clarinet, oboe, flute, alto flute, piccolo flute
- William Watrous, Wayne Andre – trombone
- Bernie Glow, Burt Collins, James Maxwell, Jimmy Nottingham, Mel Davis – trumpet
- Don Butterfield – tuba
- Aaron Rosand, Arnold Eidus, Bernard Eichen, Charles Libove, David Nadien, Gene Orloff, George Ockner, Jack Zayde, Leo Kruczek, Michael Spivakowsky, Raoul Poliakin, Tosha Samaroff – violin
