= Arthur Herzog Jr. =

American songwriter and composer (1900–1983)

Arthur Herzog Jr. (December 13, 1900 in New York City – September 1, 1983 in Detroit, Michigan) was a songwriter and composer.

== Career ==
Herzog was most known for work with Billie Holiday. He co-wrote several jazz songs she popularized, including "Don't Explain", "God Bless the Child" and "Some Other Spring". He was the father of novelist Arthur Herzog and grandfather to Amy Herzog.
