= Second to None (Carmen McRae album) =

Studio album by Carmen McRae
- Released: November 1964
- Recorded: August 4 and September 26, 1964
- Genre: Vocal jazz
- Label: Mainstream
- Producer: Bob Shad

Carmen McRae chronology
Bittersweet (1964)	Second to None (1964)	Haven't We Met? (1965)

Second to None is a 1963 studio album by jazz singer Carmen McRae, arranged and conducted by Peter Matz and produced by Bob Shad. It was released on vinyl LP on Mainstream Records.

== Critical reception ==
Professional ratings
Review scores
Source	Rating
AllMusic	3/5 stars
The Encyclopedia of Popular Music	3/5 stars

A reviewer of Billboard magazine wrote that Ms. McRae is incomparable with today's "legit" vocalists, because she is invariably inventive, and invariably talented in everything she sings, and with the support of first-class musicians Peter Matz and the full orchestra, she performs a wonderful collection of songs with impeccable timbre and phrasing. The Cash Box review said that Carmen McRae has earned many laurels in the past thanks to her brilliant, distinctive blues-jazz vocals, but this new set of sketches with the support of a big band is considered one of her most memorable to date. The reviewer of Record World noted that "Carmen has dipped into the little-done but great catalog of standards for her new package" and that "her readings are mellow and pure".

== Track listing ==
1. "In Love in Vain" (Jerome Kern) – 2:45
2. "Where Did It Go (Manhã de Carnaval) (Theme from Black Orpheus)" (Ruth Batchelor, Luiz Bonfá) – 2:32
3. "The Music That Makes Me Dance" (The Music That Makes Me Dance, Jule Styne) – 2:37
4. "Because You're Mine" (Nicholas Brodszky, Sammy Cahn) – 2:20
5. "Too Good" (Too Good, Norman Gimbel) – 2:52
6. "Once Upon a Summertime" (Michel Legrand, Eddie Barclay, Eddy Marnay, Johnny Mercer) – 3:20
7. "The Night Has a Thousand Eyes" (Buddy Bernier, Jerry Brainin) – 3:09
8. "Cloudy Morning" (Marvin Fisher, Joseph McCarthy) – 2:59
9. "Blame It on My Youth" (Edward Heyman, Oscar Levant) – 3:01
10. "Winter in May" (Artie Shaw, Ruth Batchelor) – 2:58
11. "My Reverie" (Larry Clinton) – 2:40
12. "And I Love Him" (John Lennon, Paul McCartney) – 2:12

== Charts ==
Chart performance for Second to None
Chart (1964)	Peak position
US Cash Box Looking Ahead Albums	20
