= Bennie Krueger =

American jazz saxophonist (1898–1967)

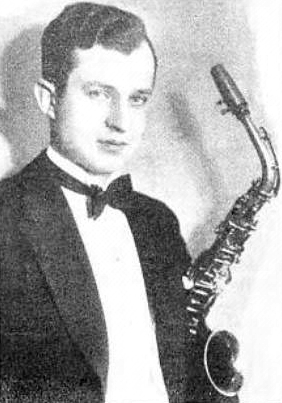

Background information
- Born: Benjamin Krueger; July 17, 1898; Newark, New Jersey, US
- Died: April 29, 1967 Jersey City, New Jersey, US
- Genres: Jazz
- Occupation: Musician
- Instrument: Saxophone
- Formerly of: Rudy Vallee, Bob Crosby

Bennie Krueger (July 17, 1898 – April 29, 1967) was an American jazz saxophonist.

After a short stint with Ross Gorman's band, Krueger's joined the Acme Sextette in New York, which included Miff Mole on trombone, Ernie Holst on violin, and Edwin Taylor Williams on banjo. He had the distinction of being one of the first jazz saxophonists on record. In 1920, the Original Dixieland Jazz Band, following a successful tour of England, cut a number of sides for the Victor Talking Machine Company. One of Victor's managers insisted, against the ODJB members' wishes, that a saxophonist be included on their early recordings. Krueger was chosen by Victor as the saxophonist, and he recorded with the ODJB in 1920 to 1921, according to Rust's Jazz Records 1897-1942.

Following the ODJB recording date, Krueger recorded numerous sides for Brunswick and Vocalion under his own name, as well as under several pseudonyms. His final recording session was for Columbia Records in May 1934, recording songs from the 1934 Carole Lombard-Bing Crosby film We're Not Dressing.

In the 1930s he worked in radio and served as musical director and orchestra conductor for Rudy Vallee and Bob Crosby. He was also a songwriter; "Sunday" was covered by Pat Boone, Lester Young and Louis Jordan). Among his outstanding recordings with his orchestra was "I Don't Know Why" (1931).
