= Carmen McRae =

American jazz singer (1920–1994)

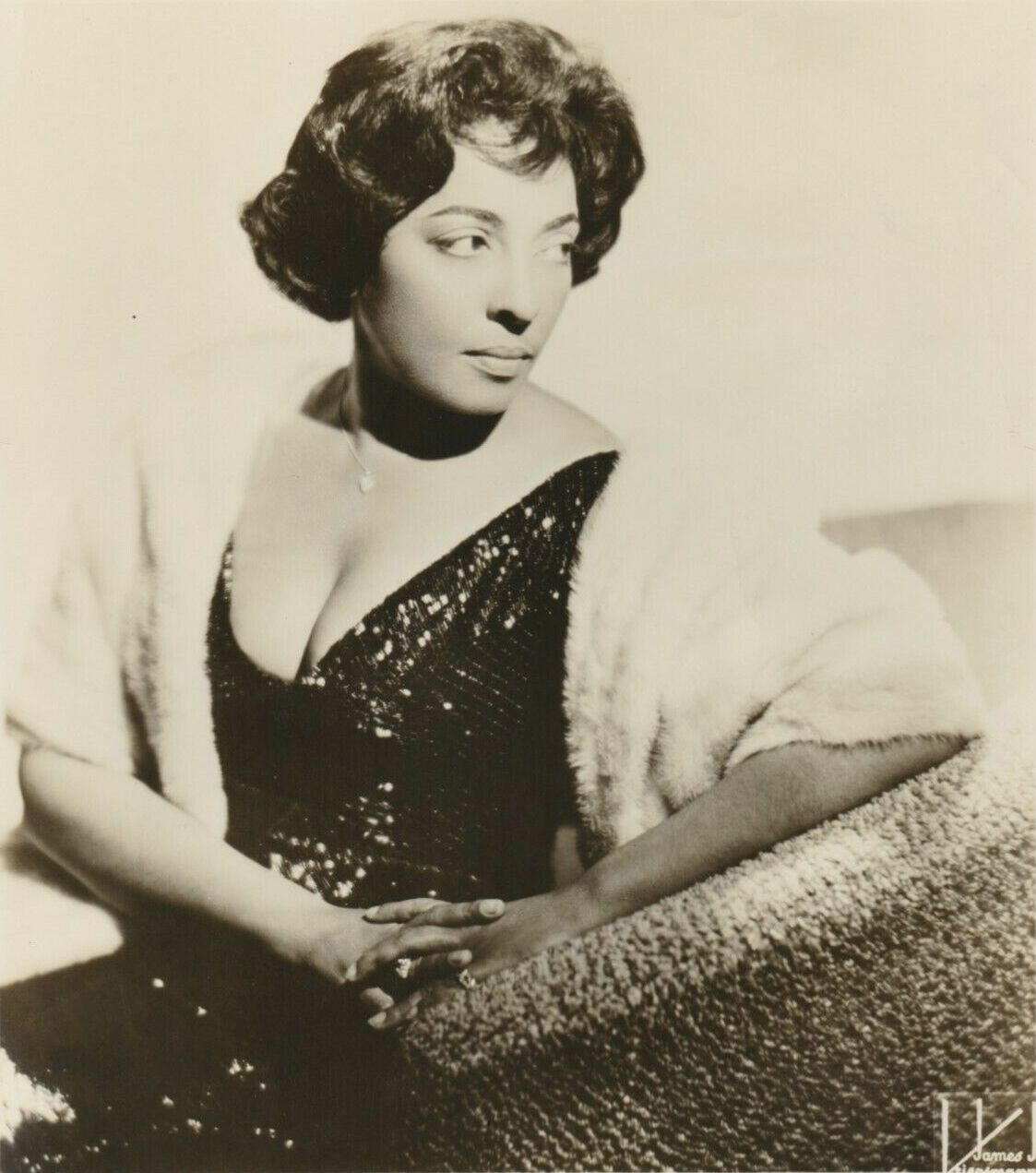
- McRae, c. 1960

Background information
- Born: Carmen Mercedes McRae; April 8, 1920; Harlem, New York, U.S.
- Died: November 10, 1994 (aged 74) Beverly Hills, California, U.S.
- Genres: Jazz; vocal jazz; traditional pop
- Occupation: Musician
- Instruments: Vocals; piano
- Works: Discography
- Years active: 1939–1991
- Labels: Decca; Kapp; Columbia; Mainstream; Atlantic; Blue Note; Concord; Novus
- Formerly of: Jack Pleis; Sammy Davis Jr.; Billie Holiday; Norman Simmons; Cal Tjader; George Shearing; Dave Brubeck
- Spouses: Kenny Clarke (m. 1944; div. 1956) Ike Isaacs (m. 1956; div. 1967)

Carmen Mercedes McRae (April 8, 1920 – November 10, 1994) was an American jazz singer. She is considered one of the most influential jazz vocalists of the 20th century and is remembered for her behind-the-beat phrasing and ironic interpretation of lyrics.

== Early life and education ==
McRae was born in Harlem, New York City, United States. Her father, Osmond, and mother, Evadne (née Gale) McRae, were immigrants from Jamaica. She began studying the piano when at the age of eight, and the music of jazz greats, such as Louis Armstrong and Duke Ellington, filled her home. When she was 17 years old, she met the singer Billie Holiday. As a teenager, McRae came to the attention of Teddy Wilson and his wife, the composer Irene Kitchings. One of McRae's early songs, "Dream of Life", was, through its influence, recorded in 1939 by Wilson's long-time collaborator Billie Holiday. McRae considered Holiday to be her primary influence.

== Early career ==
In her late teens and early twenties, McRae played piano at Minton's Playhouse, sang as a chorus girl, and worked as a secretary. It was at Minton's where she met the trumpeter Dizzy Gillespie, bassist Oscar Pettiford, and drummer Kenny Clarke; had her first important job as a pianist with Benny Carter's big band (1944); worked with Count Basie (1944); and under the name "Carmen Clarke" (having married Clarke), made her first recording as pianist with the Mercer Ellington Band (1946–47). But it was while working in Brooklyn that she came to the attention of Decca's Milt Gabler. Her five-year association with Decca yielded 12 LPs.

== Chicago interlude ==
In 1948, she moved to Chicago with the comedian and impressionist George Kirby, with whom she had fallen in love. At the end of their relationship, she worked as a pianist and singer at the Archway Lounge. She played piano steadily for almost four years at a number of clubs in Chicago before returning to New York in 1952. In Chicago, she developed her own specific style. Those years in Chicago, McRae told Jazz Forum, "gave me whatever it is that I have now. That's the most prominent schooling I ever had."

== Return to New York ==
Back in New York in the early 1950s, McRae got the record contract that launched her career. She was voted best new female vocalist of 1954 by DownBeat magazine.

Among her most notable recording projects were Mad About the Man (1957) with the composer Noël Coward; Boy Meets Girl (1957) with Sammy Davis Jr.; participating in Dave Brubeck's musical The Real Ambassadors (1961) with Louis Armstrong; the tribute album You're Lookin' at Me (A Collection of Nat King Cole Songs) (1983); cutting an album of live duets with Betty Carter, The Carmen McRae – Betty Carter Duets (1987); being accompanied by Dave Brubeck and George Shearing; and closing her career with tributes to Thelonious Monk (Carmen Sings Monk, 1990), and Sarah Vaughan (Sarah: Dedicated to You, 1991).

As a result of her early friendship with Billie Holiday ("Lady Day"), she never performed without singing at least one song associated with her, and she recorded an album in 1983 in her honor, entitled For Lady Day, released in 1995; it including the Holiday features "Good Morning Heartache", "Them There Eyes", "Lover Man", "God Bless the Child", and "Don't Explain". McRae also recorded with some of the world's best jazz musicians in albums such as Take Five Live (1961) with Dave Brubeck, Two for the Road (1980) with George Shearing, and Heat Wave (1982) with Cal Tjader. The latter two albums were part of a notable eight-year relationship with Concord Jazz.

== Performances ==
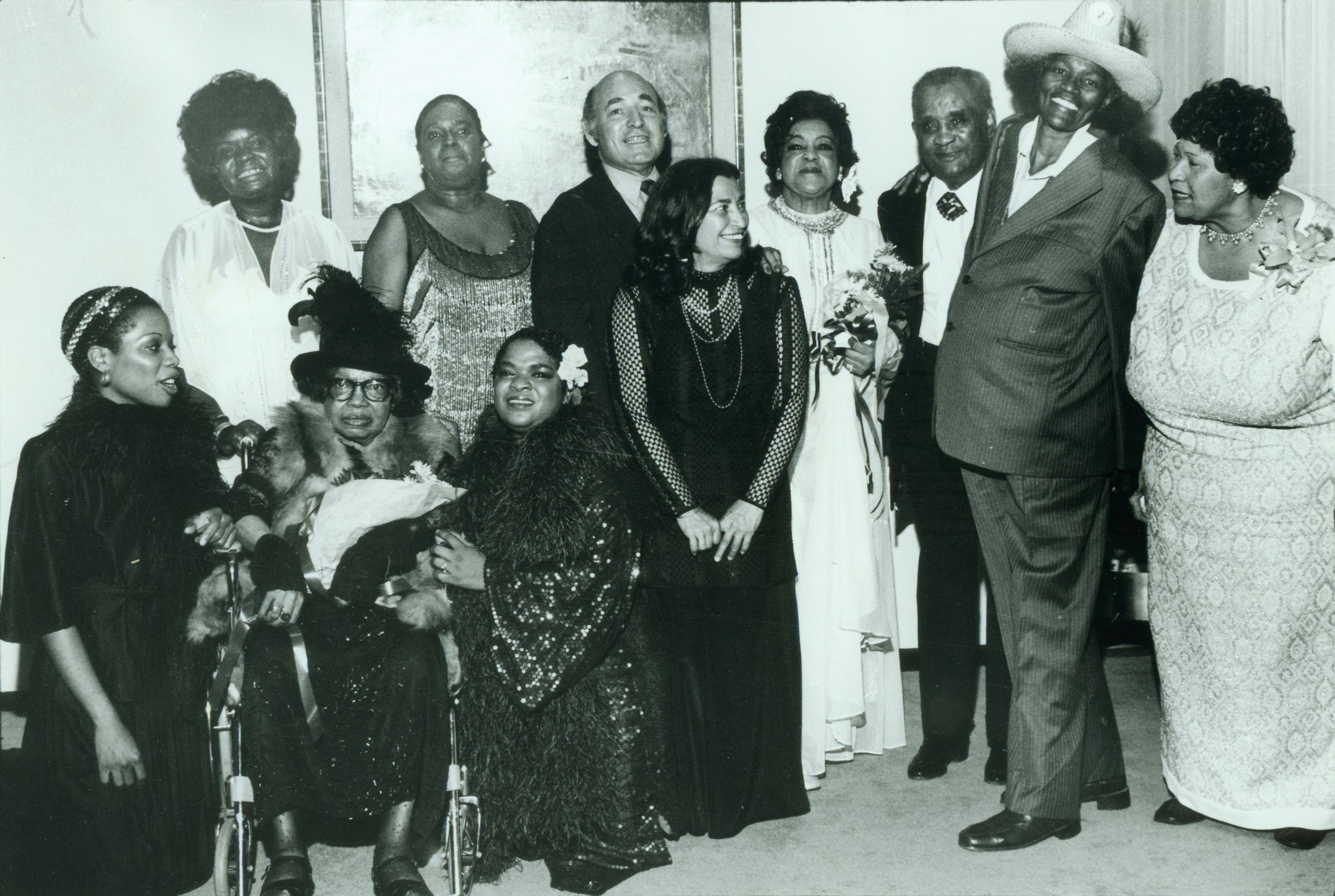
McRae (fourth from left) at the Blues Is a Woman concert for the Newport Jazz Festival, Avery Fisher Hall, 1980

McRae sang in jazz clubs throughout the United States – and across the world – for over fifty years. She was a popular performer at the Monterey Jazz Festival (1961–63, 1966, 1971, 1973, 1982), performing with Duke Ellington's orchestra at the North Sea Jazz Festival in 1980, singing "Don't Get Around Much Anymore", and at the Montreux Jazz Festival in 1989. She left New York for Southern California in the late 1960s, but appeared in New York regularly, usually at the Blue Note, where she performed two engagements a year through most of the 1980s. In May–June 1988, she collaborated with Harry Connick Jr. on the song "Please Don't Talk About Me When I'm Gone", at RCA Studios New York, for Connick's debut album, 20. She withdrew from public performance in May 1991 after an episode of respiratory failure only hours after she completed an engagement at the Blue Note Jazz Club in New York.

== Personal life and death ==
McRae married twice: to drummer Kenny Clarke from 1944 to 1956, though they separated in 1948, and to bassist Ike Isaacs from 1956 to 1967. Both marriages ended in divorce.

On November 10, 1994, McRae died at her home in Beverly Hills, California, at the age of 74. She had fallen into a semi-coma four days earlier, a month after being hospitalized due to a stroke.

== Awards ==
Grammy Award recognitions
| Year | Category | Title | Label | Result |
|---|---|---|---|---|
| 1972 | Best Jazz Performance by a Soloist | "Carmen McRae" (single) | Atlantic | Nominee |
| 1978 | Best Jazz Vocal Performance | At the Great American Music Hall | Blue Note | Nominee |
| 1985 | Best Jazz Vocal | You're Lookin' at Me (A Collection of Nat King Cole Songs) | Concord Jazz | Nominee |
| 1988 | Best Jazz Vocal Performance, Female | Any Old Time | Denon | Nominee |
| 1989 | Best Jazz Vocal Performance, Duo or Group | The Carmen McRae – Betty Carter Duets | Great American Music Hall | Nominee |
| 1989 | Best Jazz Vocal Performance, Female | Fine and Mellow: Live at Birdland West | Concord Jazz | Nominee |
| 1991 | Best Jazz Vocal Performance, Female | Carmen Sings Monk | Novus | Nominee |

Awards
| Year | Organization | Category | Result |
|---|---|---|---|
| 1993 | NAACP | NAACP Image Awards | Winner |
| 1994 | National Endowment for the Arts | NEA Jazz Masters | Winner |

== Discography ==
=== Studio albums ===
- A Foggy Day with Carmen McRae (1953)
- Carmen McRae (1955)
- By Special Request (1955)
- Torchy! (1956)
- Blue Moon (1956)
- Boy Meets Girl (1957) – with Sammy Davis Jr.
- After Glow (1957)
- Mad About the Man (1958)
- Carmen for Cool Ones (1958)
- Birds of a Feather (1958)
- Porgy and Bess (1959) – with Sammy Davis Jr.
- Book of Ballads (1959)
- When You're Away (1959)
- Something to Swing About (1960)
- Tonight Only! (1961) – with Dave Brubeck
- Carmen McRae Sings Lover Man and Other Billie Holiday Classics (1962)
- Something Wonderful (1963)
- Bittersweet (1964)
- Second to None (1964)
- Haven't We Met? (1965)
- Alfie (1966)
- For Once in My Life (1967)
- Portrait of Carmen (1968)
- The Sound of Silence (1968)
- Just a Little Lovin' (1970)
- Carmen (1972)
- It Takes a Whole Lot of Human Feeling (1973)
- Ms. Jazz (1974)
- I Am Music (1975)
- November Girl (1975)
- Can't Hide Love (1976)
- I'm Coming Home Again (1980)
- Two for the Road (1980) – with George Shearing
- Heat Wave (1982) – with Cal Tjader
- You're Lookin' at Me (A Collection of Nat King Cole Songs) (1984)
- Any Old Time (1986)
- Carmen Sings Monk (1990)
- Sarah: Dedicated to You (1991)
- Dream of Life (1998)

== Filmography ==
=== Films ===
- 1955: The Square Jungle – herself
- 1960: The Subterraneans – herself
- 1967: Hotel
- 1985: Real Genius – McRae's rendition of "You Took Advantage of Me" backs the title credit sequence
- 1986: Jo Jo Dancer, Your Life Is Calling

=== Television ===
- 1976: Soul
- 1976: Sammy and Company
- 1979: Carmen McRae in Concert
- 1979: Roots: The Next Generations
- 1980: From Jumpstreet
- 1981: At the Palace
- 1981: Billie Holiday: A Tribute
- 1982: L. A. Jazz
