= Lady Day: The Complete Billie Holiday on Columbia 1933–1944 =

Box set by Billie Holiday
- Released: October 2, 2001
- Recorded: November 1933 – January 1944
- Genre: Jazz
- Length: 11:21:57
- Label: Legacy
- Compilers: Michael Brooks; Michael Cuscuna

Billie Holiday chronology
Lady Day: The Best of Billie Holiday (2001)	Lady Day: The Complete Billie Holiday on Columbia 1933–1944 (2001)	A Musical Romance (2002)

Professional ratings
Review scores
Source	Rating
AllMusic	5/5 stars
The Rolling Stone Album Guide	5/5 stars
Encyclopedia of Popular Music	4/5 stars

Lady Day: The Complete Billie Holiday on Columbia 1933–1944 is a 10-CD box set compiling the complete known studio master recordings, plus alternate takes, of Billie Holiday during the time period indicated, released in 2001 on Columbia/Legacy, CXK 85470. Designed like an album of 78s, the medium in which these recordings initially appeared, the 10.5" × 12" box includes 230 tracks, a 116-page booklet with extensive photos, a song list, discography, essays by Michael Brooks, Gary Giddins, and Farah Jasmine Griffin, and an insert of appreciations for Holiday from a diversity of figures including Tony Bennett, Elvis Costello, Marianne Faithfull, B. B. King, Abbey Lincoln, Jill Scott, and Lucinda Williams. At the 44th Grammy Awards on February 27, 2002, the box set won the Grammy Award for Best Historical Album of the previous year.

== History ==
These recordings were made in a time before the LP album, introduced by Columbia Records in 1948. Recorded music had arrived a few decades earlier in the form of a 10-inch gramophone record playing at 78 revolutions per minute, two songs of around three-and-a-half minute duration per side. During the Great Depression, record sales for domestic use dramatically decreased, but a viable market remained for the playing of records in jukeboxes. Initially, these records featuring Billie Holiday were made with that market in mind.

John Hammond, who had discovered Holiday singing in a Harlem jazz club in 1933, arranged for her first recording session that same year on November 27. In the company of Jack Teagarden, Gene Krupa, and Hammond's future brother-in-law Benny Goodman, the two sides with Holiday would be released under Goodman's name. A little more than 19 months later, Holiday would be in another New York studio for her second session in association with Goodman again, as well as Ben Webster and Cozy Cole, under the leadership of Teddy Wilson. From July 2, 1935, through August 7, 1941, Holiday would regularly record, for commercial issue, 78s credited to herself or to Wilson.

With a few exceptions, these records were originally released on labels other than Columbia which catered to an African American market, then referred to as race records. The labels Brunswick Records and Vocalion Records became fellow companies to Columbia when it was purchased in 1934 by the American Record Corporation, which had owned Brunswick and Vocalion since late 1931. Records credited to Wilson were released on Brunswick; those to Holiday on Vocalion. With the purchase of ARC in 1939 by CBS, the corporation re-organized its record labels under the aegis of Columbia as the parent company. Starting in 1940, the Holiday releases were issued on the Okeh Records imprint, reactivated by CBS to handle its product for the "race record" market.

== Content ==
Discs one through six, and disc seven tracks one through fourteen present the master takes in chronological recorded order. The remainder of disc seven, and discs eight through ten, present the alternate takes and other items, also in chronological recorded order. The other items consist of eight tracks not part of the general body of Wilson/Holiday recordings from 1935 to 1941. The first, track 15 of disc seven "Saddest Tale" with the Duke Ellington Orchestra, was taken from the soundtrack to the short film Symphony in Black released by Paramount in 1935. Disc eight, tracks three through five, contain airchecks with the Count Basie Orchestra from 1937, the only documentation of Holiday's year-long tenure as Basie's band singer. Disc nine, tracks seven and eight, feature recordings broadcast on the Camel Caravan radio variety program of January 17, 1939; with backing by the Benny Goodman Orchestra, Billie sings alongside Johnny Mercer, Martha Tilton, and Leo Watson on the second song, Mercer's "Jeepers Creepers".

The final two tracks of the set, numbers 22 and 23 of disc ten, are from the Esquire Award Winners Concert at the Metropolitan Opera, broadcast and recorded on V-Discs for distribution to servicemen overseas during World War II. Holiday had won top female jazz vocalist for 1943, and became the first African American woman to sing at the Met. "Do Nothing 'Til You Hear From Me" and "Billie's Blues", under a different title, are performed accompanied by other Esquire poll winners, Roy Eldridge, Barney Bigard, Art Tatum, Al Casey, Oscar Pettiford, and Sidney Catlett. This recording took place more than two years after the final studio session in 1941, and during the Petrillo recording ban; the American Federation of Musicians waived the strike terms for the recording of V-discs.

Original recording sessions took place at the following locations in New York City: at the 55 Fifth Avenue Studio on November 27, 1933; at the 1776 Broadway Studio from 1935 through January 1939; at the 711 Fifth Avenue Studio from March 1939 through June 1940; at Liederkranz Hall on East 58th Street in September and October 1940; and at Columbia Studios in their new headquarters at 799 Seventh Avenue in 1941. The producers for the original recordings included John Hammond and Bernie Hanighen, others are not known.

== Significance ==
In terms of a collected body of work combining both influence and quality of achievement, these recordings are some of the most important in jazz history. Ranking jazz records always presents an exercise in both controversy and consternation, but certainly the Wilson/Holiday sides belong in the company of the Hot Five and Hot Sevens of Louis Armstrong, the collated set by Fletcher Henderson later called A Study In Frustration, the early Basie band on Decca, Duke Ellington's records with Ben Webster and Jimmy Blanton for RCA Victor, the Charlie Parker bebop sides for Savoy and Dial, and the Atlantic LPs by Ornette Coleman, not to mention the expanse of albums by Miles Davis and John Coltrane, together and separately.

The sessions coincide with the rise of the swing era on its way to becoming the popular music of the United States during the late Depression and war years. Chosen by Hammond, Hanighen, Holiday, or Wilson, many of the musicians present were members of the leading swing bands of the day, such as those by Ellington, Basie, Goodman, Artie Shaw, Jimmie Lunceford, and Cab Calloway, among others. Of special note are the records cut with members of the Basie band, Holiday herself hired by Basie in 1937, including his rhythm section of Freddie Green, Walter Page, and Jo Jones, along with key soloists Buck Clayton and Holiday's musical soul-mate, Lester Young. The roster of Holiday and Wilson sidemen reads like a who's who of jazz soloists from the 1930s.

As a singer, Holiday had influence on defining the style of a big band vocalist after that of Bing Crosby and her role model, Louis Armstrong. Her records appeared just as the swing era was getting underway; subsequently, singers such as Ella Fitzgerald, Frank Sinatra, Anita O'Day, and Peggy Lee, for instance, starting out respectively with the bands of Chick Webb, Tommy Dorsey, Gene Krupa, and Benny Goodman, all found inspiration in the Holiday records on Brunswick and Vocalion. Her manipulation of rhythm and length of musical phrases, allied to her ability to find emotional resonance in songs, was acknowledged publicly as a template by singers from her own era, Sinatra, Lee, Bennett, and others, and by myriad singers in later eras. As stated by Gary Giddins in the liner notes to the box set:

When I first got to know ["A Sailboat in the Moonlight"], I thought it a fine melody with pretty chord changes and words that might be corny but didn't seem to be so bad when Lady Day delivered them. Then I chanced to find the sheet music at a Midwestern bazaar; at home, I picked out the melody with one finger and was astonished at how different it was from what Holiday sang. Until that moment, I had not fully gauged how freely imaginative her embellishments could be. By ironing out a phrase here, retarding another there, raising this note, slurring that, she transformed a hopelessly banal and predictable melody into something personal, real, meaningful.

Sony released a boxed set for recordings originally produced for jukeboxes six to seven decades prior.

== Select collective personnel ==
- Billie Holiday – vocal
- Teddy Wilson – piano
- Bobby Hackett — cornet
- Henry "Red" Allen, Bunny Berigan, Buck Clayton, Harry "Sweets" Edison, Roy Eldridge, Chris Griffin, Harry James, Jonah Jones, Hot Lips Page, Charlie Shavers, Cootie Williams — trumpet
- Benny Morton, Dicky Wells, Trummy Young — trombone
- Buster Bailey, Benny Goodman, Vido Musso, Artie Shaw — clarinet
- Edgar Sampson — clarinet, alto saxophone
- Tab Smith — soprano saxophone, alto saxophone
- Johnny Hodges, Don Redman — alto saxophone
- Benny Carter — alto saxophone, tenor saxophone
- Chu Berry, Don Byas, Herschel Evans, Babe Russin, Ben Webster — tenor saxophone
- Lester Young — tenor saxophone, clarinet
- Harry Carney — baritone saxophone, clarinet
- Margaret "Countess" Johnson, Billy Kyle, Joe Sullivan, Claude Thornhill, Sonny White — piano
- Dave Barbour, Al Casey, Freddie Green, Carmen Mastren, Dick McDonough, Allan Reuss — guitar
- Milt Hinton, John Kirby, Grachan Moncur, Walter Page – bass
- Kenny Clarke, Cozy Cole, J.C. Heard, Jo Jones, Gene Krupa — drums

== Reissue personnel ==
- Michael Brooks – compiler
- Michael Cuscuna – compiler
- Steve Berkowitz – co-compiler
- Seth Rothstein – co-compiler
- Mark Wilder – digital remastering
- Seth Foster – digital remastering
- Phil Schaap – consultant
- Ron Jaramillo – art direction, design
- Adam Owett – art direction

== Track listing ==
In the writer(s) column the lyricists are named first.

=== Disc one ===
Track	Recorded	Catalogue	Released	Song Title	Writer(s)	Time
1.	12/18/33	Columbia 2856D	1934	Your Mother's Son-In-Law	Alberta Nichols and Mann Holiner	2:45
2.	12/18/33	Columbia 2867D	1934	Riffin' the Scotch	Johnny Mercer, Dick McDonough, Benny Goodman, Fordlee Buck	2:31
3.	7/2/35	Brunswick 7501	1935	I Wished on the Moon	Dorothy Parker and Ralph Rainger	3:01
4.	7/2/35	Brunswick 7498	1935	What a Little Moonlight Can Do	Harry M. Woods	2:56
5.	7/2/35	Brunswick 7501	1935	Miss Brown to You	Leo Robin, Richard Whiting, Ralph Rainger	2:58
6.	7/2/35	Brunswick 7498	1935	A Sunbonnet Blue (and a Yellow Straw Hat)	Irving Kahal and Sammy Fain	2:50
7.	7/31/35	Brunswick 7511	1935	What a Night, What a Moon, What a Girl	John Jacob Loeb	2:55
8.	7/31/35	Brunswick 7520	1935	I'm Painting the Town Red	Charles Tobias, Charles Newman, Sam H. Stept	2:57
9.	7/31/35	Brunswick 7511	1935	It's Too Hot for Words	Walter Samuels, Leonard Whitcup, Teddy Powell	2:45
10.	10/25/35	Brunswick 7550	1935	Twenty-Four Hours a Day	Arthur Swanstrom and James Hanley	3:00
11.	10/25/35	Brunswick 7550	1935	Yankee Doodle Never Went to Town	Ralph Freed and Bernie Hanighen	2:42
12.	10/25/35	Brunswick 7554	1935	Eeny Meeny Meiny Mo	Johnny Mercer and Matty Malneck	3:10
13.	10/25/35	Brunswick 7554	1935	If You Were Mine	Johnny Mercer and Matty Malneck	3:09
14.	12/3/35	Brunswick 7577	1936	These 'n' That 'n' Those	Milton Pascal and Edward Fairchild	3:12
15.	12/3/35	Brunswick 7581	1935	You Let Me Down	Al Dubin and Harry Warren	2:52
16.	12/3/35	Brunswick 7581	1935	Spreadin' Rhythm Around	Ted Koehler and Jimmy McHugh	2:53
17.	1/30/36	Brunswick 7612	1936	Life Begins When You're in Love	Lew Brown and Victor Schertzinger	3:02
18.	6/30/36	Brunswick 7702	1936	It's Like Reaching for the Moon	Al Lewis, Al Sherman, Gerald Marqusee	3:20
19.	6/30/36	Brunswick 7699	1936	These Foolish Things	Holt Marvell and Jack Strachey	3:17
20.	6/30/36	Brunswick 7729	1936	I Cried for You	Gus Arnheim, Arthur Freed, Abe Lyman	3:10
21.	6/30/36	Brunswick 7702	1936	Guess Who	Ralph Freed and Burton Lane	3:08
22.	7/10/36	Vocalion 3276	1936	Did I Remember?	Harold Adamson and Walter Donaldson	2:49
23.	7/10/36	Vocalion 3276	1936	No Regrets	Harry Tobias and Roy Ingraham	2:35
24.	7/10/36	Vocalion 3288	1936	Summertime	DuBose Heyward, Ira Gershwin, George Gershwin	2:53
25.	7/10/36	Vocalion 3288	1936	Billie's Blues	Billie Holiday	2:38

=== Disc two ===
Track	Recorded	Catalogue	Released	Song Title	Writer(s)	Time
1.	9/29/36	Vocalion 3333	1936	A Fine Romance	Dorothy Fields and Jerome Kern	2:51
2.	9/29/36	Vocalion 3333	1936	I Can't Pretend	Charles Tobias, Paul Rusincky, W. Edward Breuder	3:03
3.	9/29/36	Vocalion 3334	1936	One, Two, Button Your Shoe	Arthur Johnston and Johnny Burke	2:47
4.	9/29/36	Vocalion 3334	1936	Let's Call a Heart a Heart	Arthur Johnston and Johnny Burke	2:59
5.	10/21/36	Brunswick 7762	1936	Easy to Love	Cole Porter	3:10
6.	10/21/36	Brunswick 7768	1936	With Thee I Swing	Basil Adam, Alex Hyde, Al Stillman	3:16
7.	10/21/36	Brunswick 7762	1936	The Way You Look Tonight	Dorothy Fields and Jerome Kern	3:00
8.	10/21/36	Brunswick 7768	1936	Who Loves You?	Benny Davis and J. Fred Coots	3:13
9.	11/19/36	Brunswick 7789	1936	Pennies from Heaven	Arthur Johnston and Johnny Burke	3:15
10.	11/19/36	Brunswick 7789	1936	That's Life I Guess	Peter DeRose and Sam M. Lewis	3:08
11.	11/19/36	Brunswick 7781	1936	I Can't Give You Anything but Love	Dorothy Fields and Jimmy McHugh	3:26
12.	1/12/37	Vocalion 3431	1937	One Never Knows, Does One?	Mack Gordon and Harry Revel	3:02
13.	1/12/37	Vocalion 3431	1937	I've Got My Love to Keep Me Warm	Irving Berlin	2:55
14.	1/12/37	Vocalion 3440	1937	If My Heart Could Only Talk	Walter Samuels, Leonard Whitcup, Teddy Powell	3:03
15.	1/12/37	Vocalion 3440	1937	Please Keep Me in Your Dreams	Tot Seymour and Vee Lawnhurst	2:16
16.	1/25/37	Brunswick 7824	1937	He Ain't Got Rhythm	Irving Berlin	2:49
17.	1/25/37	Brunswick 7824	1937	This Year's Kisses	Irving Berlin	3:08
18.	1/25/37	Brunswick 7859	1937	Why Was I Born?	Oscar Hammerstein II and Jerome Kern	2:50
19.	1/25/37	Brunswick 7859	1937	I Must Have That Man	Dorothy Fields and Jimmy McHugh	2:54
20.	2/18/37	Brunswick 7844	1937	The Mood That I'm In	Abner Silver and Al Sherman	2:59
21.	2/18/37	Brunswick 7840	1937	You Showed Me the Way	Ella Fitzgerald, Teddy McRae, Chick Webb, Bud Green	2:58
22.	2/18/37	Brunswick 7844	1937	Sentimental and Melancholy	Johnny Mercer and Richard Whiting	2:37
23.	2/18/37	Brunswick 7840	1937	My Last Affair	Haven A. Johnson	3:08

=== Disc three ===
Track	Recorded	Catalogue	Released	Song Title	Writer(s)	Time
1.	3/31/37	Brunswick 7867	1937	Carelessly	Nick Kenny, Charles Kenny, Norman Ellis	3:05
2.	3/31/37	Brunswick 7867	1937	How Could You?	Al Dubin and Harry Warren	2:29
3.	3/31/37	Brunswick 7877	1937	Moanin' Low	Howard Dietz and Ralph Rainger	3:03
4.	4/1/37	Vocalion 3543	1937	Where Is the Sun?	John Redmond and Lee David	2:45
5.	4/1/37	Vocalion 3520	1937	Let's Call the Whole Thing Off	Ira Gershwin and George Gershwin	2:36
6.	4/1/37	Vocalion 3520	1937	They Can't Take That Away from Me	Ira Gershwin and George Gershwin	3:02
7.	4/1/37	Vocalion 3543	1937	Don't Know If I'm Comin' or Goin'	Lee Wainer and Lupin Fien	2:45
8.	5/11/37	Brunswick 7917	1937	Sun Showers	Arthur Freed and Nacio Herb Brown	3:06
9.	5/11/37	Brunswick 7917	1937	Yours and Mine	Arthur Freed and Nacio Herb Brown	3:15
10.	5/11/37	Brunswick 7903	1937	I'll Get By	Roy Turk and Fred E. Ahlert	3:07
11.	5/11/37	Brunswick 7903	1937	Mean to Me	Roy Turk and Fred E. Ahlert	3:06
12.	6/1/37	Brunswick 7911	1937	Foolin' Myself	Peter Tinturin and Jack Lawrence	3:00
13.	6/1/37	Brunswick 7911	1937	Easy Living	Leo Robin and Ralph Rainger	3:02
14.	6/1/37	Brunswick 7926	1937	I'll Never Be The Same	Gus Kahn, Frank Signorelli, Matty Malneck	3:01
15.	6/15/37	Vocalion 3593	1937	Me, Myself, and I	Irving Gordon, Allen Roberts, Alvin Kaufman	2:35
16.	6/15/37	Vocalion 3605	1937	A Sailboat in the Moonlight	Carmen Lombardo and John Jacob Loeb	2:49
17.	6/15/37	Vocalion 3605	1937	Born to Love	Jack Scholl and M.K. Jerome	2:38
18.	6/15/37	Vocalion 3593	1937	Without Your Love	Johnny Lange and Fred Stryker	2:51
19.	9/13/37	Vocalion 3701	1937	Getting Some Fun Out of Life	Edgar Leslie and Joseph A. Burke	3:00
20.	9/13/37	Vocalion 3701	1937	Who Wants Love?	Gus Kahn and Franz Waxman	2:32
21.	9/13/37	Vocalion 3748	1937	Travelin' All Alone	J. C. Johnson	2:12
22.	9/13/37	Vocalion 3748	1937	He's Funny That Way	Neil Moret and Richard Whiting	2:39

=== Disc four ===
Track	Recorded	Catalogue	Released	Song Title	Writer(s)	Time
1.	11/1/37	Brunswick 8015	1937	Nice Work If You Can Get It	Ira Gershwin and George Gershwin	3:07
2.	11/1/37	Brunswick 8015	1937	Things Are Looking Up	Ira Gershwin and George Gershwin	3:19
3.	11/1/37	Brunswick 8008	1937	My Man	Jacques Charles, Channing Pollock, Albert Willemetz, Maurice Yvain	3:01
4.	11/1/37	Brunswick 8008	1937	Can't Help Lovin' Dat Man	Oscar Hammerstein II and Jerome Kern	3:14
5.	1/6/38	Brunswick 8053	1938	My First Impression of You	Charles Tobias and Sam H. Stept	2:47
6.	1/6/38	Brunswick 8070	1938	When You're Smiling	Mark Fisher, Joe Goodwin, Larry Shay	2:50
7.	1/6/38	Brunswick 8070	1938	I Can't Believe That You're in Love with Me	Clarence Gaskill and Jimmy McHugh	2:49
8.	1/6/38	Brunswick 8053	1938	If Dreams Come True	Edgar Sampson, Benny Goodman, Irving Mills	3:03
9.	1/12/38	Vocalion 3947	1938	Now They Call It Swing	Walter Hirsch, Vaughn De Leath, Norman Cloutier, Lou Handman	2:58
10.	1/12/38	Vocalion 3947	1938	On the Sentimental Side	Johnny Burke and Jimmy Monaco	3:03
11.	1/12/38	Vocalion 4029	1938	Back in Your Own Backyard	Al Jolson, Billy Rose, Dave Dreyer	2:40
12.	1/12/38	Vocalion 4029	1938	When a Woman Loves a Man	Johnny Mercer, Bernie Hanighen, Gordon Jenkins	2:23
13.	5/11/38	Vocalion 4126	1938	You Go to My Head	J. Fred Coots and Haven Gillespie	2:52
14.	5/11/38	Vocalion 4126	1938	The Moon Looks Down and Laughs	Bert Kalmar, Sid Silvers, Harry Ruby	2:55
15.	5/11/38	Vocalion 4151	1938	If I Were You	Bob Emmerich and Buddy Bernier	2:24
16.	5/11/38	Vocalion 4151	1938	Forget If You Can	Jack Manus, Ken Upham, Leonard Joy	2:48
17.	6/23/38	Vocalion 4208	1938	Having Myself a Time	Leo Robin and Ralph Rainger	2:28
18.	6/23/38	Vocalion 4208	1938	Says My Heart	Frank Loesser and Burton Lane	2:48
19.	6/23/38	Vocalion 4238	1938	I Wish I Had You	Bud Green, Al Stillman, Claude Thornhill	2:49
20.	6/23/38	Vocalion 4238	1938	I'm Gonna Lock My Heart (and Throw Away the Key)	Jimmy Eaton and Terry Shand	2:06
21.	9/15/38	Vocalion 4457	1938	The Very Thought of You	Ray Noble	2:45
22.	9/15/38	Vocalion 4457	1938	I Can't Get Started	Ira Gershwin and Vernon Duke	2:46
23.	9/15/38	Vocalion 4396	1938	I've Got a Date with a Dream	Mack Gordon and Harry Revel	2:42
24.	9/15/38	Vocalion 4396	1938	You Can't Be Mine	J. C. Johnson and Chick Webb	2:21

=== Disc five ===
Track	Recorded	Catalogue	Released	Song Title	Writer(s)	Time
1.	10/31/38	Brunswick 8259	1938	Everybody's Laughing	Sammy Lerner and Ben Oakland	3:00
2.	10/31/38	Brunswick 8259	1938	Here It Is Tomorrow Again	Patrick Gibbons and Roy Ringwald	2:44
3.	10/31/38	Brunswick 8270	1938	Say It with a Kiss	Harry Warren and Johnny Mercer	2:34
4.	10/31/38	Brunswick 8265	1938	April in My Heart	Helen Meinardi and Hoagy Carmichael	3:06
5.	10/31/38	Brunswick 8265	1938	I'll Never Fail You	Irving Taylor and Vic Mizzy	2:58
6.	10/31/38	Brunswick 8270	1938	They Say	Paul Mann, Stephan Weiss, Edward Heyman	3:10
7.	11/28/38	Brunswick 8283	1938	You're So Desirable	Ray Noble	2:51
8.	11/28/38	Brunswick 8281	1938	You're Gonna See a Lot of Me	Al Goodhart, Manny Kurtz, Al Hoffman	2:57
9.	11/28/38	Brunswick 8281	1938	Hello, My Darling	Frank Loesser and Friedrich Hollaender	2:43
10.	11/28/38	Brunswick 8283	1938	Let's Dream in the Moonlight	Raoul Walsh and Matty Malneck	2:53
11.	1/20/39	Vocalion 4631	1939	That's All I Ask of You	Robert E. Pope	2:56
12.	1/20/39	Vocalion 4631	1939	Dream of Life	Carmen McRae	2:43
13.	1/30/39	Brunswick 8314	1939	What Shall I Say?	Peter Tinturin	3:04
14.	1/30/39	Brunswick 8314	1939	It's Easy to Blame the Weather	Sammy Cahn and Saul Chaplin	2:58
15.	1/30/39	Brunswick 8319	1939	More Than You Know	Vincent Youmans, Billy Rose, Edward Eliscu	3:05
16.	1/30/39	Brunswick 8319	1939	Sugar	Maceo Pinkard, Sidney Mitchell, Edna Alexander	2:45
17.	3/21/39	Vocalion 4834	1939	You're Too Lovely to Last	Teddy McRae, Charlie Beal, Earl Fraser	2:48
18.	3/21/39	Vocalion 4786	1939	Under a Blue Jungle Moon	R. Conway and N. Brisben	2:55
19.	3/21/39	Vocalion 4786	1939	Everything Happens for the Best	Billie Holiday and Tab Smith	2:48
20.	3/21/39	Vocalion 4834	1939	Why Did I Always Depend on You?	Teddy McRae	2:31
21.	3/21/39	Columbia 37586	1941	Long Gone Blues	Billie Holiday	3:05

=== Disc six ===
Track	Recorded	Catalogue	Released	Song Title	Writer(s)	Time
1.	7/5/39	Vocalion 5021	1939	Some Other Spring	Arthur Herzog Jr. and Irene Kitchings	3:01
2.	7/5/39	Vocalion 5129	1939	Our Love Is Different	Billie Holiday, R. Conway, Basil Alba, Sonny White	3:13
3.	7/5/39	Vocalion 5021	1939	Them There Eyes	Maceo Pinkard, William Tracey, Doris Tauber	2:48
4.	7/5/39	Vocalion 5129	1939	Swing Brother Swing	Clarence Williams, Lewis Raymond, Walter Bishop Sr.	2:54
5.	12/13/39	Vocalion 5377	1940	Night and Day	Cole Porter	2:58
6.	12/13/39	Vocalion 5377	1940	The Man I Love	Ira Gershwin and George Gershwin	3:04
7.	12/13/39	Vocalion 5302	1939	You're Just a No Account	Sammy Cahn and Saul Chaplin	2:58
8.	12/13/39	Vocalion 5302	1939	You're a Lucky Guy	Sammy Cahn and Saul Chaplin	2:43
9.	2/29/40	Vocalion 5609	1940	Ghost of Yesterday	Arthur Herzog Jr. and Irene Kitchings	2:37
10.	2/29/40	Vocalion 5481	1940	Body and Soul	Johnny Green, Edward Heyman, Robert Sour, Frank Eyton	2:57
11.	2/29/40	Vocalion 5481	1940	What Is This Going to Get Us?	Arthur Herzog Jr. and Irene Kitchings	2:39
12.	2/29/40	Vocalion 5609	1940	Falling in Love Again	Sammy Lerner and Friedrich Hollaender	2:49
13.	6/7/40	Okeh 5991	1941	I'm Pulling Through	Arthur Herzog Jr. and Irene Kitchings	3:09
14.	6/7/40	Vocalion 5719	1940	Tell Me More-More-Then Some	Billie Holiday	3:07
15.	6/7/40	Vocalion 5719	1940	Laughing at Life	Nick Kenny, Charles Kenny, Bob Todd, Cornell Todd	2:54
16.	6/7/40	Okeh 5991	1941	Time on My Hands (You in My Arms)	Vincent Youmans, Harold Adamson, Mack Gordon	3:04
17.	9/12/40	Okeh 5831	1940	I'm All for You	Jerry Bresler and Larry Wynn	3:08
18.	9/12/40	Okeh 5831	1940	I Hear Music	Frank Loesser and Burton Lane	2:39
19.	9/12/40	Okeh 5806	1940	The Same Old Story	Michael Field, Newt Oliphant	3:10
20.	9/12/40	Okeh 5806	1940	Practice Makes Perfect	Don Roberts and Ernest Gold	2:34
21.	10/15/40	Okeh 6064	1941	St. Louis Blues	W.C. Handy	2:53
22.	10/15/40	Okeh 6064	1941	Loveless Love	W.C. Handy	3:15
23.	3/21/41	Okeh 6134	1941	Let's Do It	Cole Porter	2:55
24.	3/21/41	Okeh 6134	1941	Georgia on My Mind	Stuart Gorrell and Hoagy Carmichael	3:17

=== Disc seven ===
Track	Recorded	Catalogue	Released	Song Title	Writer(s)	Time
1.	3/21/41	Okeh 6214	1941	Romance in the Dark	Sam Coslow and Gertrude Niesen	2:15
2.	3/21/41	Okeh 6214	1941	All of Me	Seymour Simons and Gerald Marks	3:01
3.	5/9/41	Okeh 6451	1941	I'm in a Low Down Groove	Roy Jacobs	3:08
4.	5/9/41	Okeh 6270	1941	God Bless the Child	Billie Holiday and Arthur Herzog	2:58
5.	5/9/41	Columbia 37586	1941	Am I Blue?	Harry Akst and Grant Clarke	2:50
6.	5/9/41	Okeh 6270	1941	Solitude	Duke Ellington, Eddie DeLange, and Irving Mills	3:13
7.	8/7/41	Okeh 6369	1941	Jim	Nelson Shawn, Caesar Petrillo, Edward Ross	3:08
8.	8/7/41	Columbia 37493	1945	I Cover the Waterfront	Johnny Green and Edward Heyman	2:55
9.	8/7/41	Okeh 6369	1941	Love Me or Leave Me	Walter Donaldson and Gus Kahn	3:20
10.	8/7/41	Okeh 6451	1941	Gloomy Sunday	Rezső Seress, László Jávor, Sam M. Lewis	3:11
11.	2/10/42	Harmony 1075	1947	Wherever You Are	Cliff Friend and Charles Tobias	2:59
12.	2/10/42	Columbia CL6163	1950	Mandy Is Two	Johnny Mercer and Fulton McGrath	2:59
13.	2/10/42	Harmony 1075	1947	It's a Sin to Tell a Lie	Billy Mayhew	3:02
14.	2/10/42	Columbia 37493	1945	Until the Real Thing Comes Along	Sammy Cahn, Saul Chaplin, L.E. Freeman, Alberta Nichols, Mann Holiner	3:08
15.	3/12/35	Legacy C3K 47724	1991	Saddest Tale	Irving Mills and Duke Ellington	2:53
16.	7/10/36	previously unreleased		No Regrets (Take 2)	Harry Tobias and Roy Ingraham	2:35
17.	10/21/36	previously unreleased		The Way You Look Tonight (Take 1)	Dorothy Fields and Jerome Kern	3:07
18.	10/21/36	previously unreleased		Who Loves You? (Take 3)	Benny Davis and J. Fred Coots	3:14
19.	11/19/36	previously unreleased		Pennies from Heaven (Take 2)	Arthur Johnston and Johnny Burke	3:13
20.	11/19/36	previously unreleased		That's Life I Guess (Take 2)	Peter DeRose and Sam M. Lewis	3:18
21.	4/1/37	previously unreleased		They Can't Take That Away from Me (Take 2)	Ira Gershwin and George Gershwin	2:54
22.	4/1/37	previously unreleased		Don't Know If I'm Comin' or Goin' (Take 2)	Lee Wainer and Lupin Fien	2:45
23.	5/11/37	Columbia C3L40	1964	I'll Get By (Take 2)	Roy Turk and Fred E. Ahlert	3:06
24.	5/11/37	Columbia C3L40	1964	Mean to Me (Take 2)	Roy Turk and Fred E. Ahlert	3:05

=== Disc eight ===
Track	Recorded	Catalogue	Released	Song Title	Writer(s)	Time
1.	6/15/37	Columbia CL6129	1951	Me, Myself, and I (Take 1)	Irving Gordon, Allan Roberts, Alvin Kaufman	2:35
2.	6/15/37	Columbia CL6163	1951	Without Your Love (Take 2)	Johnny Lange and Fred Stryker	2:52
3.	6/30/37*	Columbia C3L21	1964	They Can't Take That Away from Me	Ira Gershwin and George Gershwin	3:23
4.	6/30/37*	Columbia C3L21	1964	Swing Brother Swing	Clarence Williams, Lewis Raymond, Walter Bishop Sr.	1:50
5.	11/3/37*	Columbia C3L21	1964	I Can't Get Started	Ira Gershwin and Vernon Duke	2:45
6.	1/6/38	Columbia C3L40	1964	My First Impression of You (Take 3)	Charles Tobias and Sam H. Stept	2:50
7.	1/6/38	Columbia 36208	1945	When You're Smiling (Take 4)	Mark Fisher, Joe Goodwin, Larry Shay	3:00
8.	1/6/38	Columbia 36335	1945	I Can't Believe That You're in Love with Me (Alternate take)	Clarence Gaskill and Jimmy McHugh	2:48
9.	1/6/38	Columbia JG34837	1976	If Dreams Come True (Take 2)	Edgar Sampson and Benny Goodman	3:03
10.	1/12/38	Columbia C3L40	1964	Now They Call It Swing (Take 1)	Walter Hirsch, Vaughan DeLeath, Norman Cloutier, Lou Handman	3:04
11.	1/12/38	Columbia C3L21	1964	On the Sentimental Side (Take 1)	Johnny Burke and Jimmy Monaco	3:04
12.	1/12/38	Columbia JG34837	1976	Back in Your Own Backyard (Take 2)	Al Jolson, Billy Rose, Dave Dreyer	3:14
13.	5/11/38	previously unreleased		You Go to My Head (Take 2)	J. Fred Coots and Haven Gillespie	2:52
14.	5/11/38	previously unreleased		The Moon Looks Down and Laughs (Take 2)	Bert Kalmar, Sid Silvers, Harry Ruby	2:54
15.	5/11/38	previously unreleased		If I Were You (Take 1)	Bob Emmerich and Buddy Bernier	2:27
16.	5/11/38	previously unreleased		Forget If You Can (Take 1)	Jack Manus, Ken Upham, Leonard Joy	2:49
17.	6/23/38	Legacy C3K 47724	1991	Having Myself a Time (Take 2)	Leo Robin and Ralph Rainger	2:29
18.	6/23/38	Legacy C3K 47724	1991	Says My Heart (Take 2)	Frank Loesser and Burton Lane	2:43
19.	6/23/38	previously unreleased		I Wish I Had You (Take 1)	Bud Green, Al Stillman, Claude Thornhill	2:59
20.	6/23/38	Columbia C3L40	1964	I'm Gonna Lock My Heart (and Throw Away the Key) (Take 2)	Jimmy Eaton and Terry Shand	2:06
21.	9/15/38	Columbia JG34837	1976	I Can't Get Started (Take 2)	Ira Gershwin and Vernon Duke	2:46
22.	9/15/38	Columbia JG34837	1976	I've Got a Date with a Dream (Take 2)	Mack Gordon and Harry Revel	2:41

=== Disc nine ===
Track	Recorded	Catalogue	Released	Song Title	Writer(s)	Time
1.	10/31/38	previously unreleased		April in My Heart (Take 2)	Helen Meinardi and Hoagy Carmichael	3:12
2.	10/31/38	Columbia C3L40	1964	They Say (Take 2)	Paul Mann, Stephan Weiss, Edward Heyman	3:03
3.	11/28/38	previously unreleased		You're So Desirable (Take 2)	Ray Noble	2:53
4.	11/28/38	previously unreleased		You're Gonna See a Lot of Me (Take 2)	Al Goodhart, Manny Kurtz, Al Hoffman	2:58
5.	11/28/38	previously unreleased		Hello, My Darling (Take 2)	Frank Loesser and Friedrich Hollaender	2:42
6.	11/28/38	previously unreleased		Let's Dream in the Moonlight (Take 1)	Raoul Walsh and Matt Malneck	2:54
7.	1/17/39*	Legacy C3K 47724	1991	I Cried for You	Gus Arnheim, Arthur Freed, Abe Lyman	2:29
8.	1/17/39*	Legacy C3K 47724	1991	Jeepers Creepers	Harry Warren and Johnny Mercer	3:01
9.	1/20/39	previously unreleased		That's All I Ask of You (Alternate take)	R.E. Pope	2:58
10.	1/30/39	Columbia C3L40	1964	More Than You Know (Take 2)	Vincent Youmans, Billy Rose, Edward Eliscu	3:04
11.	3/21/39	previously unreleased		You're Too Lovely to Last (Take 2)	Teddy McRae, C. Beal, E. Frazer	3:01
12.	3/21/39	previously unreleased		Under a Blue Jungle Moon (Take 2)	R. Conway and N. Brisben	3:03
13.	12/13/39	Legacy C3K 47724	1991	Night and Day (Take 2)	Cole Porter	3:02
14.	2/29/40	Columbia C3L40	1964	Falling in Love Again (Take 2)	Sammy Lerner and Friedrich Hollaender	2:46
15.	6/7/40	Columbia C234849	1977	Laughing at Life (Take 2)	Nick Kenny, Charles Kenny, Bob Todd, Cornell Todd	2:54
16.	9/12/40	Columbia C3L40	1964	I'm All for You (Take 2)	Jerry Bresler and Larry Wynn	3:27
17.	9/12/40	Columbia C3L40	1964	I Hear Music (Take 2)	Frank Loesser and Burton Lane	2:39
18.	9/12/40	Columbia C3L40	1964	The Same Old Story (Take 2)	Michael Field, Newt Oliphant	3:10
19.	9/12/40	previously unreleased		The Same Old Story (Take 3)	Michael Field, Newt Oliphant	3:09
20.	9/12/40	Epic SN6042	1964	Practice Makes Perfect (Take 2)	Don Roberts and Ernest Gold	2:35
21.	9/12/40	Columbia C3L40	1964	Practice Makes Perfect (Take 3)	Don Roberts and Ernest Gold	2:42
22.	9/12/40	previously unreleased		Practice Makes Perfect (Take 4)	Don Roberts and Ernest Gold	2:43

=== Disc ten ===
Track	Recorded	Catalogue	Released	Song Title	Writer(s)	Time
1.	10/15/40	previously unreleased		St. Louis Blues (Take 2)	W.C. Handy	2:50
2.	10/15/40	previously unreleased		Loveless Love (Take 2)	W.C. Handy	3:15
3.	3/21/41	Columbia C234849	1977	Let's Do It (Take 2)	Cole Porter	2:56
4.	3/21/41	previously unreleased		Georgia on My Mind (Take 2)	Stuart Gorrell and Hoagy Carmichael	2:59
5.	3/21/41	previously unreleased		Georgia on My Mind (Take 3)	Stuart Gorrell and Hoagy Carmichael	3:05
6.	3/21/41	previously unreleased		Romance in the Dark (Take 2)	Sam Coslow and Gertrude Niesen	2:18
7.	3/21/41	previously unreleased		Romance in the Dark (Take 3)	Sam Coslow and Gertrude Niesen	2:14
8.	3/21/41	previously unreleased		Romance in the Dark (Take 4)	Sam Coslow and Gertrude Niesen	2:26
9.	3/21/41	Columbia C234849	1977	All of Me (Take 2)	Seymour Simons and Gerald Marks	2:59
10.	3/21/41	Columbia C234849	1977	All of Me (Take 3)	Seymour Simons and Gerald Marks	3:57
11.	5/9/41	Time-Life STL3	1978	God Bless the Child (Take 2)	Billie Holiday and Arthur Herzog	2:58
12.	5/9/41	Legacy C3K 47724	1991	God Bless the Child (Take 3)	Billie Holiday and Arthur Herzog	2:32
13.	5/9/41	previously unreleased		Am I Blue? (Take 2)	Harry Akst and Grant Clarke	2:45
14.	5/9/41	previously unreleased		Am I Blue? (Take 3)	Harry Akst and Grant Clarke	2:45
15.	8/7/41	previously unreleased		Jim (Take 2)	Nelson Shawn, Caesar Petrillo, Edward Ross	3:04
16.	8/7/41	previously unreleased		Gloomy Sunday (Take 2)	Rezső Seress, László Jávor, Sam M. Lewis	3:12
17.	8/7/41	previously unreleased		Wherever You Are (Take 2)	Cliff Friend and Charles Tobias	2:59
18.	8/7/41	previously unreleased		Mandy Is Two (Take 2)	Johnny Mercer and Fulton McGrath	2:59
19.	8/7/41	previously unreleased		It's a Sin to Tell a Lie (Take 2)	Billy Mayhew	3:08
20.	8/7/41	previously unreleased		It's a Sin to Tell a Lie (Take 3)	Billy Mayhew	3:07
21.	8/7/41	Legacy C3K 47724	1991	Until the Real Thing Comes Along (Take 2)	Sammy Cahn, Saul Chaplin, Alberta Nichols, Mann Holiner	3:18
22.	1/26/44*	V-Disc 672	1948	Do Nothing 'Til You Hear from Me	Bob Russell and Duke Ellington	4:58
23.	1/26/44*	V-Disc 28	1948	I Love My Man	Billie Holiday	4:05

* live recordings
