= Pure Ella =

Compilation album by Ella Fitzgerald
- Released: 1994
- Label: MCA Records

Pure Ella is a 1994 Ella Fitzgerald CD released by MCA Records that combines Fitzgerald's 1950 album Ella Sings Gershwin with her 1954 album Songs in a Mellow Mood, both of which featured accompaniment by Ellis Larkins.

It was given a four-star rating by AllMusic.

== Track listing ==
1. "Someone to Watch Over Me" - 3:13
2. "My One and Only" - 3:13
3. "But Not for Me" - 3:12
4. "Looking For a Boy" - 3:06
5. "I've Got a Crush on You" - 3:13
6. "How Long Has This Been Going On?" - 3:14
7. "Maybe" - 3:21
8. "Soon" - 2:44
9. "I'm Glad There Is You" (Jimmy Dorsey, Paul Mertz) – 3:10
10. "What Is There to Say?" (Vernon Duke, Yip Harburg) – 3:22
11. "People Will Say We're in Love" (Oscar Hammerstein II, Richard Rodgers) – 3:12
12. "Please Be Kind" (Sammy Cahn, Saul Chaplin) – 3:36
13. "Until the Real Thing Comes Along" (Cahn, Chaplin, L.E. Freeman, Mann Holiner, Alberta Nichols) – 2:58
14. "Makin' Whoopee" (Walter Donaldson, Gus Kahn) – 3:07
15. "Imagination" (Johnny Burke, Jimmy Van Heusen) – 2:38
16. "Stardust" (Hoagy Carmichael, Mitchell Parish) – 4:03
17. "My Heart Belongs to Daddy" (Cole Porter) – 2:39
18. "You Leave Me Breathless" (Ralph Freed, Frederick Hollander) – 3:07
19. "Baby, What Else Can I Do?" (Walter Hirsch, Ralph Marks) – 3:50
20. "Nice Work If You Can Get It" (George Gershwin, Ira Gershwin) – 2:38
