= Songs in a Mellow Mood =

Studio album by Ella Fitzgerald
- Released: 1954
- Recorded: March 29–30, 1954
- Genre: Jazz
- Length: 38:20
- Label: Decca
- Producer: Milt Gabler

Ella Fitzgerald chronology
Ella Sings Gershwin (1950)	Songs in a Mellow Mood (1954)	Lullabies of Birdland (1955)

Professional ratings
Review scores
Source	Rating
AllMusic	4/5 stars
The Encyclopedia of Popular Music	4/5 stars

Songs in a Mellow Mood is a 1954 studio album by Ella Fitzgerald, accompanied by the pianist Ellis Larkins. The complete album was re-issued as part of the 1994 MCA Records CD, Pure Ella.

== Track listing ==
Side one

1. "I'm Glad There Is You" (Jimmy Dorsey, Paul Mertz) – 3:10
2. "What Is There to Say?" (Vernon Duke, Yip Harburg) – 3:22
3. "People Will Say We're in Love" (Oscar Hammerstein II, Richard Rodgers) – 3:12
4. "Please Be Kind" (Sammy Cahn, Saul Chaplin) – 3:36
5. "Until the Real Thing Comes Along" (Cahn, Chaplin, Alberta Nichols, Mann Holiner, L.E. Freeman) – 2:58
6. "Makin' Whoopee" (Walter Donaldson, Gus Kahn) – 3:07

Side two

1. "Imagination" (Johnny Burke, Jimmy Van Heusen) – 2:38
2. "Stardust" (Hoagy Carmichael, Mitchell Parish) – 4:03
3. "My Heart Belongs to Daddy" (Cole Porter) – 2:39
4. "You Leave Me Breathless" (Ralph Freed, Frederick Hollander) – 3:07
5. "Baby, What Else Can I Do?" (Gerald Marks, Walter Hirsch) – 3:50
6. "Nice Work If You Can Get It" (George Gershwin, Ira Gershwin) – 2:38

== Personnel ==
- Ella Fitzgerald - vocals
- Ellis Larkins - piano
