= Blue Moon (Carmen McRae album) =

Studio album by Carmen McRae
- Released: 1956
- Genre: Jazz
- Length: 35:52
- Label: Decca
- Producer: Ken Druker

Carmen McRae chronology
Torchy (1956)	Blue Moon (1956)	Boy Meets Girl (1957)

Professional ratings
Review scores
Source	Rating
Allmusic	4/5 stars
The Penguin Guide to Jazz Recordings	3/4 stars

Blue Moon is an album by jazz singer Carmen McRae, released on Decca Records in 1956.

== Content ==
Allmusic critic Scott Yanow gave the album four out of five stars, stating:

Much of the music on this excellent (but obscure) Carmen McRae LP has not been reissued, and certainly not in complete form. Accompanied by an orchestra arranged and conducted by either Tadd Dameron or Jimmy Mundy, McRae performs both standards and obscurities, ballads and medium-tempo tunes. The big band is pretty anonymous but fine in ensemble work; the main focus is on the singer's voice anyway. Highlights include "Blue Moon", "My Foolish Heart", "I'm Putting All My Eggs In One Basket" and Mundell Lowe's "All This Could Lead to Love".

== Track listing ==
Side 1

1. "Blue Moon" (Richard Rodgers, Lorenz Hart) - 2:35
2. "My Foolish Heart" (Victor Young, Ned Washington) - 3:12
3. "I Was Doing All Right" (George Gershwin, Ira Gershwin) - 2:49
4. "Summer Is Gone" (Don Costa) - 3:27
5. "I'm Putting All My Eggs in One Basket" (Irving Berlin) - 2:24
6. "Nowhere" (Joe Mooney) - 2:45

Side 2

1. "Until the Real Thing Comes Along (Mann Holiner, Alberta Nichols, Saul Chaplin, Sammy Cahn, L.E. Freeman) - 3:23
2. "Lush Life (Billy Strayhorn) - 3:37
3. "Even If It Breaks My Heart" (Dick Carter, C. Henry Woods) - 2:35
4. "Laughing Boy" (Jack Segal) - 3:01
5. "Lilacs in the Rain" (Peter DeRose, Mitchell Parish) - 2:52
6. "All This Could Lead to Love" (Mundell Lowe, Walter Bishop, Sr.) - 3:12
