= Riffin' the Scotch =

1934 song

Single by Billie Holiday with the Benny Goodman Orchestra
- Released: 1934
- Recorded: 18 December 1933
- Genre: Jazz
- Label: Columbia; COL 2867-D
- Songwriter(s): Benny Goodman, Dick McDonough, Buck Washington, Johnny Mercer
- Producer(s): John Hammond

"Riffin' the Scotch" is a song written by Benny Goodman, Dick McDonough and Buck Washington with lyrics by Johnny Mercer that was recorded by Billie Holiday with a band led by Goodman on 14 December 1933. It was produced by John Hammond.

The song is credited to Benny Goodman, Dick McDonough and Buck Washington. The lyrics were written by Johnny Mercer. Mercer later recalled being approached by McDonough who had written a composition called "Riffin the Scotch" for which he needed words. Mercer gave him the lyrics to a song he had written called "I jumped out of the frying pan and into the fire", McDonough's title was subsequently kept, which bears no relation to Mercer's lyrics.

This was Holiday's second recording, recorded on 13 December 1933 in New York City, a month after her first, "Your Mother's Son-In-Law", also with Goodman and his band. It is a novelty song, based around the pun of scotch whiskey and featuring sound effects reminiscent of Scottish bagpipes at the beginning and a popping cork sound at the end. The lyrics of the song concern "the tale of a woman who has gotten rid of one bad man only to wind up with another", according to Holiday's biographer John Szwed. Szwed felt the song was "thrown together" but recognised it as a song that she had to make the most of to develop her recording career. He felt that Holiday was able to use her unique sense rhythm to "find her way around the rigidity of the band" despite being aged only 18. Following this recording, it was to be another year and a half before Holiday recorded again.

Gunter Schuller describes the song as an "inconsequential number". Schuller praises trumpeter Shirley Clay and trombonist Jack Teagarden's solos. Schuller felt Holiday's rhythmic energy distinguished the song from the "otherwise pervasive limpid crooning styles" and that the song represented her unique way with "words and pitches" and how she could twist and bend them to her purposes. Schuller felt her performance gave the song a "a bouncy devil-may-care joviality" and it was the first of many songs she would sing about unrequited love and failed expectations.

== Personnel ==
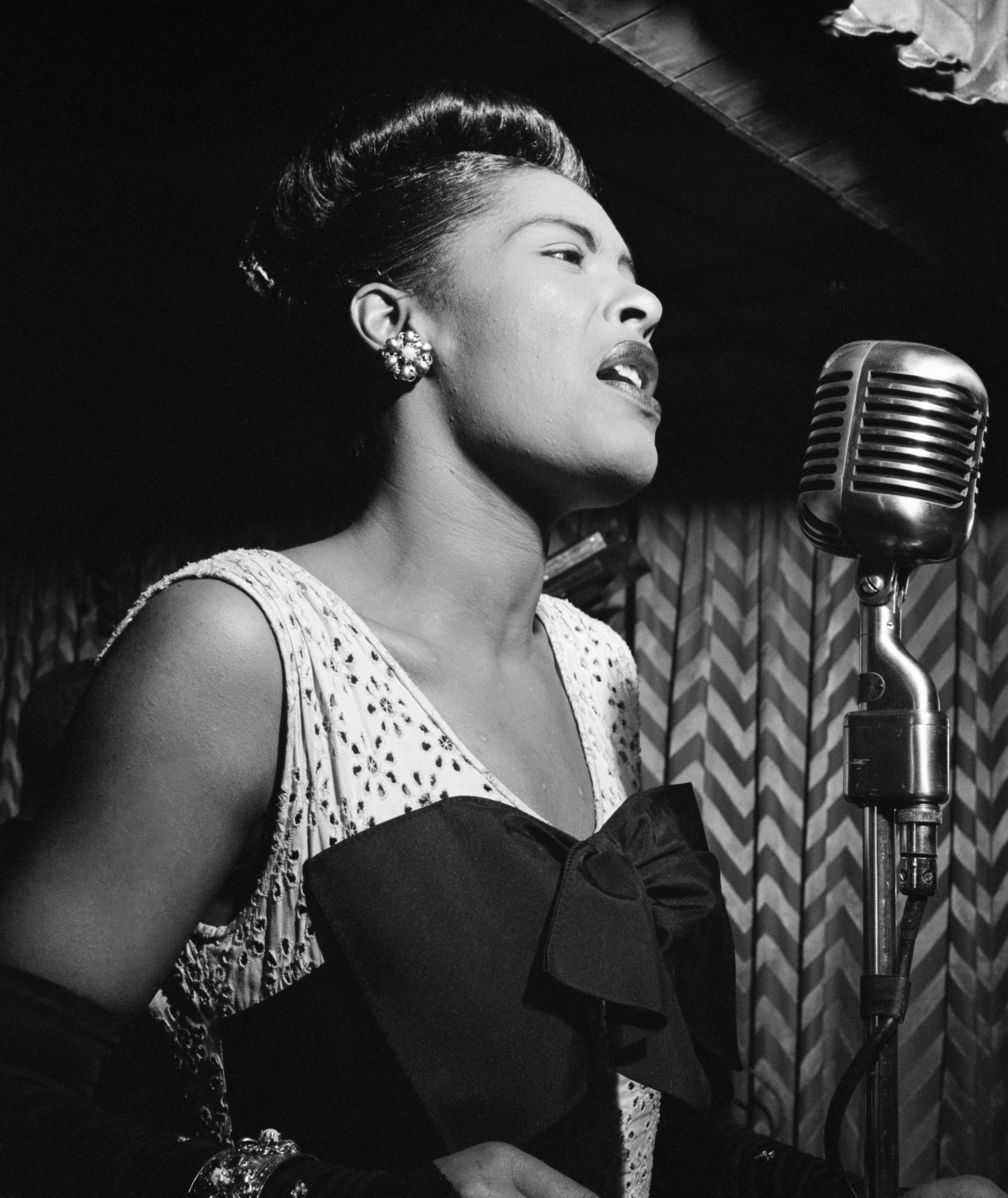
Billie Holiday in 1947

- Billie Holiday – vocals
- Charlie Teagarden, Shirley Clay – trumpet
- Jack Teagarden – trombone
- Benny Goodman – clarinet
- Art Karle – tenor saxophone
- Buck Washington or Joe Sullivan – piano
- Dick McDonough – guitar
- Artie Bernstein – double bass
- Gene Krupa – drums
- Deane Kincaide – arranger
