= Until the Real Thing Comes Along =

"(It Will Have to Do) Until the Real Thing Comes Along"

Song
- Published: 1936 by Chappell & Co.
- Songwriters: Mann Holiner, Alberta Nichols, Sammy Cahn, Saul Chaplin and L.E. Freeman

"(It Will Have to Do) Until the Real Thing Comes Along" is a popular song first published in 1936.

== Background ==
In 1931, Alberta Nichols wrote the music and Mann Holiner wrote the words for a song titled "Till the Real Thing Comes Along" which was featured in a Broadway revue titled Rhapsody in Black. The review, produced by Lew Leslie, was similar to the famous Blackbirds reviews of the late 1920s and 1930s, and featured Ethel Waters, who introduced "Till the Real Thing Comes Along". The song was not a hit in its original incarnation, though a sheet music edition was published by Shapiro, Bernstein & Co. in 1931.

In 1936, the song was substantially rewritten by composer Saul Chaplin, lyricist Sammy Cahn, and saxophonist L.E. Freeman. A completely new verse replaced the original verse, a new melody replaced the original melody of the refrain, and a mostly new set of lyrics replaced the original lyric of the refrain. What was retained from the 1931 composition was the recurring lyric motif of the song's title. In its original form, this motif was "If that isn't love, I guess it'll do / Till the real thing comes along". In the 1936 song, it was revised slightly to "If that isn't love, it will have to do / Until the real thing comes along." Additionally, part of one line in the refrain ("I'd sigh for you, cry for you") was retained, though the conclusion of that line was rewritten from "I'd lay myself down and die for you" to "I'd tear the stars down from the sky for you".

The re-written song was published by Chappell & Co. and quickly became a hit, with recordings in 1936 by Andy Kirk and His 12 Clouds of Joy, Fats Waller, Jan Garber & His Orchestra (vocal by Russell Brown) and by Erskine Hawkins & His Orchestra (vocal by Billy Daniels). While at least one early sheet music edition of the 1936 song omitted Nichols and Holiner from the credits, ASCAP and most sheet music editions list five writers (Nichols, Holiner, Chaplin, Cahn, and Freeman).

== Notable recordings ==
- Fats Waller, (8/1/1936) Victor matrix BS-102402, per DAHR website.
- The Ink Spots feat. Bill Kenny, this reached No. 24 in the Billboard charts in 1941.
- Billie Holiday (1942) Columbia Record 78 rpm; re-issued on the Columbia release Lady Day: the Best of Billie Holiday (2001)
- The Ravens (1947)
- Ella Fitzgerald and Ellis Larkins on the Decca album release Songs in a Mellow Mood (1954), re-released as part of the album, Pure Ella (1994).
- Frankie Laine and Buck Clayton - on their album Jazz Spectacular (1956)
- Carmen McRae - Blue Moon (1956)
- June Christy - included in the album This Is June Christy (1956).
- Nat King Cole - on his album Tell Me All About Yourself (1960)
- Dean Martin - on his album This Time I'm Swingin'! (1960)
- Dexter Gordon - on his album A Swingin' Affair (1962).
- Aretha Franklin for her album Laughing on the Outside (1962).
- Sandy Denny - Like an Old Fashioned Waltz (1974)
- James Booker - Junco Partner (1976)
- Frank Sinatra - L.A. Is My Lady (1984)
- Rod Stewart - As Time Goes By: The Great American Songbook, Volume II (2003)
- Natalie Cole – Still Unforgettable (2008)
- Noah Preminger - Before The Rain (2011)
