= Your Mother's Son-In-Law =

1933 song

Single by Billie Holiday with the Benny Goodman Orchestra
- B-side: "Tappin' the Barrel"
- Released: 1933
- Recorded: 27 November 1933
- Genre: Jazz
- Label: Columbia; COL 2856-D
- Songwriter(s): Alberta Nichols and Mann Holiner
- Producer(s): John Hammond

Billie Holiday with the Benny Goodman Orchestra singles chronology
"Your Mother's Son-In-Law" (1933)	"Riffin' the Scotch" (1934)

"Your Mother's Son-In-Law" is a song written by Alberta Nichols and Mann Holiner that was recorded by Billie Holiday with a band led by Benny Goodman on 27 November 1933. It was Holiday's first recording. It was produced by John Hammond. The song was recorded in three takes, and Holiday was paid $35 (equivalent to $850 in 2024) for her performance.

Holiday was initially nervous as she prepared to make her first recording. The singer Ethel Waters was present in the studio, which further increased her anxiousness. Waters had recorded in the same studio earlier in the day with the same band. Holiday was also intimidated by the presence of the famous vaudevillian Buck Washington who played the piano on the recording. Buck encouraged her to sing, telling her that she wouldn't want "all these people" to think that she was a 'square'. The song was recorded in a key that Holiday was uncomfortable with and at a faster pace than she wanted at Goodman's behest. Holiday's biographer John Szwed describes the arrangement as "busy" and "too fast". Szwed wrote that the arrangement "pitched her voice so high that it forced her to virtually shout over the band".

In his book Texan Jazz, Dave Oliphant noted that on the song Holiday was already using her noted "quavering drop" at the end of words which was possibly adapted from the trumpet stylings of Louis Armstrong and began words with a "gruffness" to lend her vocal lines forcefulness and personality. Oliphant highlights Jack Teagarden's trombone solo on the song, noting that it shares with Holiday's vocal "some of the same exuberance in the face of the wistful and (even inappropriate lyrics)". Oliphant praises Benny Goodman's clarinet solo as that of a "consummate swing artist".

The song later appeared in Lew Leslie's revue Blackbirds of 1934.

In a 1956 interview with Willis Conover for Voice of America's Jazz Hour, Holiday claimed that she was 14 years old at the time of the recording (she was actually eighteen) and that the song "sounds like I was doing comedy" as "my voice sounds so funny and high".

The lyrics of the song reference the opera singer Jules Bledsoe and the actor and singer George Jessel, popular musical artists at the time of the recording.

== Personnel ==
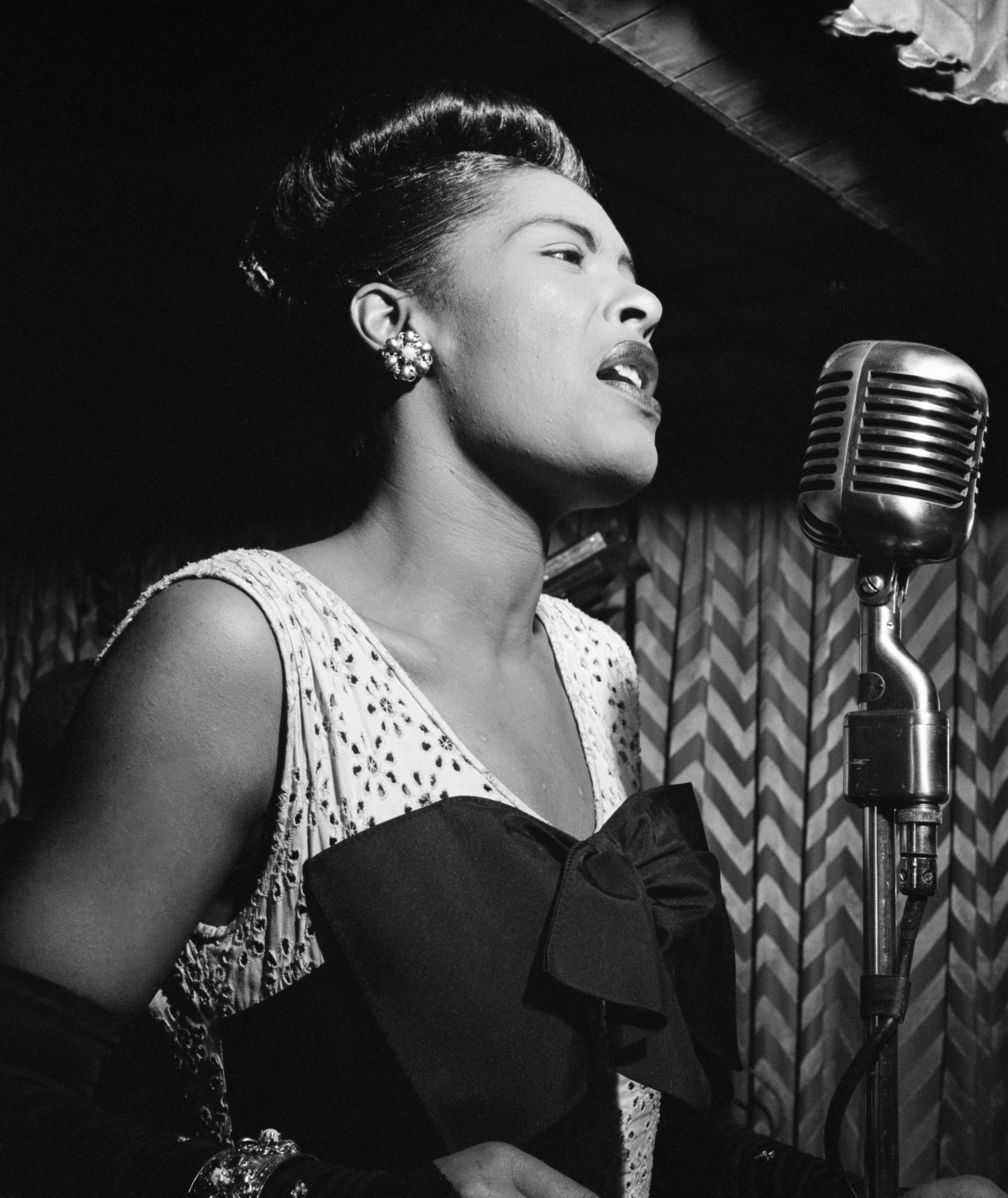
Billie Holiday in 1947

- Billie Holiday – vocals
- Charlie Teagarden, Shirley Clay – trumpet
- Jack Teagarden – trombone
- Benny Goodman – clarinet
- Art Karle – tenor saxophone
- Buck Washington or Joe Sullivan – piano
- Dick McDonough – guitar
- Artie Bernstein – double bass
- Gene Krupa – drums
- Deane Kincaide – arranger
