= Newport Jazz Festival: Live at Carnegie Hall =

Ella Fitzgerald at the Newport Jazz Festival: Live at Carnegie Hall

Live album by Ella Fitzgerald
- Released: 1973
- Recorded: July 5, 1973
- Genre: Jazz
- Length: 134:06
- Label: Columbia
- Producer: Norman Granz

Ella Fitzgerald chronology
Jazz at Santa Monica Civic '72 (1972)	Ella Fitzgerald at the Newport Jazz Festival: Live at Carnegie Hall (1973)	Take Love Easy (1973)

Professional ratings
Review scores
Source	Rating
AllMusic	4.5/5 stars
Encyclopedia of Popular Music	4/5 stars

Ella Fitzgerald at the Newport Jazz Festival: Live at Carnegie Hall is a 1973 live album by the American jazz singer Ella Fitzgerald, accompanied by a reconstructed Chick Webb Band, the pianist Ellis Larkins, and for the second half of the album, the Tommy Flanagan Quartet (featuring Joe Pass).

This was a historic night for Fitzgerald, reuniting her with many members that had worked with her when she performed with the drummer and Bandleader Chick Webb in the mid-1930s. Fitzgerald is also reunited with the pianist Ellis Larkins, who accompanied on her 1950 album Ella Sings Gershwin. The second half of the record sees Fitzgerald perform a typical set from this stage in her career.

Fitzgerald is introduced by the great jazz singer Carmen McRae on the second disc. McRae also appeared on the 2001 remastered edition of Fitzgerald's only other recorded appearance at the Newport Jazz Festival, 1958's Ella Fitzgerald and Billie Holiday at Newport.

== Track listing ==
Disc one

1. Opening Announcement by Eddie Barefield, "Let's Get Together" (Chick Webb) – 1:04
2. "Stompin' at the Savoy" (Benny Goodman, Andy Razaf, Edgar Sampson, Webb) – 3:46
3. "A-Tisket, A-Tasket" (Van Alexander, Ella Fitzgerald) – 3:16
4. "Indian Summer" (Al Dubin, Victor Herbert) – 5:08
5. "Smooth Sailing" (Jimmy Cobb) – 3:38
6. Eddie Barefield Original (Eddie Barefield) – 3:30
7. Band Introductions/"Let's Get Together" – 2:01
8. Announcement by George Wein – 1:04
9. "You Turned the Tables on Me" (Louis Alter, Sidney D. Mitchell) – 5:01
10. "Nice Work If You Can Get It" (George Gershwin, Ira Gershwin) – 2:57
11. "I've Got a Crush on You" (G. Gershwin, I. Gershwin) – 2:48
12. Introduction of the 'Jazz at Carnegie All-Stars' by George Wein – 1:46
13. "Somebody Loves Me" (Buddy DeSylva, G. Gershwin, Ballard MacDonald) – 9:19
14. Medley: "I Can't Get Started"/"The Young Man with the Horn"/"Round Midnight" (I. Gershwin, Vernon Duke)/(Bernie Hanighen, Thelonious Monk, Cootie Williams) – 9:03
15. "Stardust" (Hoagy Carmichael, Mitchell Parish) – 3:58
16. "Avalon" (Buddy DeSylva, Al Jolson, Vincent Rose) – 13:10

Disc Two

1. "C Jam Blues" (Barney Bigard, Duke Ellington) – 12:33
2. Introductions of Ella Fitzgerald by George Wein and Carmen McRae – 2:26
3. "I've Gotta Be Me" (Walter Marks) – 3:04
4. "Down in the Depths (On the Ninetieth Floor)" (Cole Porter) – 4:55
5. "Good Morning Heartache" (Ervin Drake, Dan Fisher, Irene Higginbotham) – 5:42
6. "What's Going On" (Renaldo Benson, Al Cleveland, Marvin Gaye) – 4:17
7. "Miss Otis Regrets" (Porter) – 4:55
8. "Don't Worry 'bout Me" (Rube Bloom, Ted Koehler) – 3:10
9. "These Foolish Things (Remind Me of You)" (Harry Link, Holt Marvell, Jack Strachey) – 3:28
10. "Any Old Blues" (Fitzgerald) – 4:44
11. "Taking a Chance on Love" (Duke, Ted Fetter, John La Touche) – 2:09
12. "I'm in the Mood for Love" (Dorothy Fields, Jimmy McHugh) – 1:19
13. "Lemon Drop" (George Wallington) – 4:49
14. "A-Tisket, A-Tasket" (excerpt) – 2:13
15. "Some of These Days" (Shelton Brooks) – 6:29
16. "People" (Bob Merrill, Jule Styne) – 4:45
17. "A-Tisket, A-Tasket" (excerpt) – 0:42

== Personnel ==
Recorded July 5, 1973, by Record Plant Remote in Carnegie Hall, New York City.

- Ella Fitzgerald - vocals
- Roy Eldridge, Taft Jordan - trumpet
- Al Grey - trombone
- Eddie "Lockjaw" Davis - tenor saxophone
- Ellis Larkins, Tommy Flanagan - piano
- Joe Pass - guitar
- Panama Francis - drums
