= By Special Request =

By Special Request may refer to:

- By Special Request (Guy Lombardo album), 1962
- By Special Request (Carmen McRae album), 1956
- By Special Request, 2018 album by Toronto Mass Choir
