= Lady Day (disambiguation) =

Lady Day is the traditional name of the Feast of the Annunciation of the Blessed Virgin.

Lady Day may also refer to:

- Billie Holiday (1915–1959), American jazz singer
- Lady Day: The Complete Billie Holiday on Columbia 1933–1944
- Lady Day (Amii Stewart album), 2004
- "Lady Day", a song by Lou Reed from the album Berlin (1973)
- "Lady Day", a song by Lifehouse from the album Almería
- "Lady Day", a song by Rod Stewart on Gasoline Alley (album) (1970)
