= A Foggy Day with Carmen McRae =

Studio album by Carmen McRae
- Released: October 1953
- Recorded: 1953
- Genre: Jazz
- Length: 28:00
- Label: Stardust

Carmen McRae chronology
A Foggy Day with Carmen McRae (1953)	Carmen McRae (1955)

A Foggy Day with Carmen McRae is the debut studio album by American singer Carmen McRae, released in 1953 through Stardust Records. The second side of the record features songs performed by Ivie Anderson, who had already died by the time of release.

== Overview ==
Carmen McRae was already quite well known in jazz circles by the time of recording, she performed in various jazz bars as a vocalist or pianist, but she did not receive commercial offers. The recording of MacRae's new material in the studio happened because her singing attracted businessman Len Frank, who was going to start his own small label Stardust. He organized several sessions for her, which resulted in eight songs. All eight of them were released on singles, and five were eventually re-released on this album. Thanks to these recordings, in 1954, McRae was recognized as the best new singer by DownBeat magazine.

== Critical reception ==
Commenting on the performance of the title song, Cash Box magazine noted that "Gershwin's famous oldie gets a smooth interpretation from Carmen McRae in a muted romantic manner, gradually turning into swing."

== Track listing ==
Side A (Carmen McRae)
No.	Title	Length
1.	"A Foggy Day"	2:05
2.	"Go Slow"	3:15
3.	"Are You Happy?"	3:20
4.	"Pavane"	2:37
5.	"Oh, My Darling!"	2:41

Side B (Ivie Anderson)
No.	Title	Length
1.	"Charlie is My Darling"	2:44
2.	"Evening Blues"	2:47
3.	"Empty Bed Blues"	3:03
4.	"I Don't Know His Name"	2:46
5.	"Drive Me Daddy"	3:02
