= Miss Brown to You =

1935 song recorded by Billie Holiday

"Miss Brown to You" is a song with music composed by Richard A. Whiting and Ralph Rainger, and lyrics written by Leo Robin.

It was first recorded on July 25, 1935, by Billie Holiday accompanied by Teddy Wilson and his orchestra. This version is featured on Lady Day: The Complete Billie Holiday on Columbia 1933–1944.

A live favorite, Holiday recorded the song many times:

- in June 1949 for the FRS radio broadcast, Just Jazz in Los Angeles with Neal Hefti on trumpet, Herbie Harper on trombone, Herbie Steward on clarinet and tenor saxophone, Jimmy Rowles on piano, Robert "Iggy" Shevak on bass, and Blinkie Garner on drums;
- on October 31, 1951, at the Storyville Club in Boston with Buster Harding on piano, John Field on bass, and Marquis Foster on drums;
- on November 10, 1956, at Carnegie Hall, New York City, with Her Orchestra formed by Roy Eldridge on trumpet, Coleman Hawkins on tenor saxophone, Carl Drinkard on piano, Kenny Burrell on guitar, Carson Smith on bass, and Chico Hamilton on drums.
