= Torchy (album) =

Torchy!

Studio album by Carmen McRae
- Released: 1956
- Recorded: December 16, 29 and 30, 1955
- Genre: Vocal jazz; traditional pop
- Length: 36:25
- Label: Decca

Carmen McRae chronology
| By Special Request (1955) | Torchy! (1956) | Blue Moon (1957) |

Torchy! is a 1956 album by jazz singer Carmen McRae arranged by Jack Pleis and Ralph Burns.

== Critical reception ==
Professional ratings
Review scores
| Source | Rating |
|---|---|
| Allmusic | 4/5 stars |
| Billboard | 77/100 |
| The Encyclopedia of Popular Music | 3/5 stars |
| The Penguin Guide to Jazz | 4/4 stars |

Jason Ankeny described the album as "a lush, potently atmospheric collection of romantic ballads rendered for maximum impact" and that the "...sheer intensity of McRae's vocals render orchestration virtually moot. Few singers have equaled her conviction or her fierce intelligence, and her interpretations of songs like "But Beautiful," "My Future Just Passed," and "We'll Be Together Again" pack a devastating emotional punch." A reviewer of Billboard magazine noted that this album looks more like a pop release than others, but does not lose its appeal to the jazz crowd, as well as that MacRae sings with his usual warmth and good taste.

== Track listing ==
1. "Last Night When We Were Young" (Harold Arlen, Yip Harburg) – 2:38
2. "Speak Low" (Kurt Weill, Ogden Nash) – 3:07
3. "But Beautiful" (Jimmy Van Heusen, Johnny Burke) – 2:55
4. "If You'd Stay the Way I Dream About You" (Arthur Herzog, Jr., Irene Kitchings) – 2:47
5. "Midnight Sun" (Lionel Hampton, Burke, Johnny Mercer) – 3:45
6. "My Future Just Passed" (Richard A. Whiting, George Marion, Jr) – 3:18
7. "Yesterdays" (Jerome Kern, Otto Harbach) – 2:33
8. "We'll Be Together Again" (Carl T. Fischer, Frankie Laine) – 3:04
9. "I'm a Dreamer, Aren't We All" (Ray Henderson, Buddy DeSylva, Lew Brown) – 2:40
10. "Good Morning Heartache" (Ervin Drake, Irene Higginbotham, Dan Fisher) – 3:20
11. "Star Eyes" (Don Raye, Gene DePaul) – 3:08
12. "I Don't Stand a Ghost of a Chance with You" (Victor Young, Bing Crosby, Ned Washington) – 3:10

== Personnel ==
- Carmen McRae – vocals
- Ralph Burns, Jack Pleis – arranger
