= Carmen McRae (1955 album) =

Studio album by Carmen McRae
- Released: 1955
- Recorded: October–December 1954
- Genre: Jazz
- Length: 36:11
- Label: Bethlehem

Carmen McRae chronology
A Foggy Day with Carmen McRae (1953)	Carmen McRae (1955)	By Special Request (1955)

Carmen McRae is a 1955 album by jazz singer Carmen McRae. It was McRae's second album and was released on the Bethlehem label exclusively as a 10-inch monoaural LP. The album was reissued on LP in 1976 as The Finest of Carmen McRae: You'd Be So Easy to Love, with an additional track, "Too Much in Love to Care". In 1994 Bethlehem had digitally remastered the recordings and released a CD with six additional tracks, alternate takes of songs from the original sessions.

== Reception ==
Professional ratings
Review scores
Source	Rating
Allmusic	3.5/5 stars
The Encyclopedia of Popular Music	3/5 stars
The Rolling Stone Jazz & Blues Album Guide	3.5/5 stars

Scott Yanow reviewed the album for Allmusic and wrote of it, "Overall the music is pleasing but not too memorable and one wishes there were more variety."

== Track listing ==
1. "You'd Be So Easy to Love" (Cole Porter) – 2:26
2. "If I'm Lucky (I'll Be the One)" (Chuck Darwin, Paulette Girard) – 3:17
3. "Old Devil Moon" (E.Y. "Yip" Harburg, Burton Lane) – 2:40
4. "Tip Toe Gently" (Mat Mathews, Girard) – 2:40
5. "You Made Me Care" (Darwin, Girard) – 2:09
6. "Last Time for Love" (Carmen McRae) – 3:05
7. "Misery" (Tony Scott) – 3:53
8. "Too Much in Love to Care" (Carroll Coates, James J. Kriegsmann) – 2:33

=== Alternate takes released on 1994 CD reissue ===
9. "Too Much in Love to Care" (alternate take) – 3:19
10. "Old Devil Moon" (alternate stereo) – 2:37
11. "You Made Me Care" (alternate stereo) – 2:09
12. "Too Much in Love to Care" (alternate stereo) – 2:20
13. "Last Time for Love" (alternate stereo) – 3:03

== Personnel ==
- Carmen McRae – vocals

=== Tracks 1–4 ===
- Herbie Mann – flute, tenor saxophone
- Mat Mathews – accordion
- Mundell Lowe – guitar
- Wendell Marshall – double bass
- Kenny Clarke – drums

=== Tracks 5–8 ===
- Tony Scott – clarinet, piano (on "Misery")
- Dick Katz – piano
- Skip Fawcett – double bass
- Osie Johnson – drums
