= Ellis Larkins at Maybeck =

Live album by Ellis Larkins
- Recorded: March 1992
- Venue: Maybeck Recital Hall, Berkeley, California
- Genre: Jazz
- Label: Concord

Ellis Larkins at Maybeck: Maybeck Recital Hall Series Volume Twenty-Two is an album of solo performances by jazz pianist Ellis Larkins.

== Music and recording ==
The album was recorded at the Maybeck Recital Hall in Berkeley, California in March 1992. The material, chosen by Larkins, is "a rarefied selection of songs [...] as well as some Ellington and a tune of his own".

== Release and reception ==
Professional ratings
Review scores
Source	Rating
AllMusic	4.5/5 stars
The Penguin Guide to Jazz	3.5/4 stars
The Encyclopedia of Popular Music	4/5 stars

The AllMusic review described Larkins as "A tasteful and subtle player whose chord voicings are unique". The Penguin Guide to Jazz wrote that Larkins's "proper technique, off-kilter humour and very slow, stately swing make up a kind of jazz that has almost vanished".

== Track listing ==
1. "Introductory Announcement"
2. "How'dja Like to Love Me?"
3. "Perfume and Rain"
4. "Oh, Lady Be Good"
5. "I Don't Want to Cry Anymore"
6. "Blue Skies"
7. "No More/God Bless the Child"
8. "I Let a Song Go Out of My Heart"
9. "Spring Will Be a Little Late This Year"
10. "Leave Me Alone"
11. "Things Ain't What They Used to Be"
12. "When a Woman Loves a Man/I'm Through with Love"

== Personnel ==
- Ellis Larkins – piano
