= Sonny White =

American jazz musician

Ellerton Oswald White (November 11, 1917, in Panama City, Panama – April 28, 1971, in New York City), better known as Sonny White, was a jazz pianist.

White took on the nickname Sonny while a member of Jesse Stone's band in the middle of the 1930s. Later in the decade he played with Willie Bryant, Sidney Bechet, Teddy Hill (whose band at the time also included Dizzy Gillespie and Kenny Clarke), and Frankie Newton. White recorded several sessions with Billie Holiday, with whom he had a yearlong affair in 1939, and their engagement was announced in Melody Maker that May. White was a member of different line-ups backing Holiday in New York between January 1939 and October 1940, including the classic recording of "Strange Fruit"; in her autobiography, Lady Sings the Blues, Holiday mistakenly credits White with having co-written the music, to a poem by Lewis Allan.

In the 1940s he spent time in the bands of Artie Shaw, Benny Carter, with whom he played both directly before and directly after military service during World War II, and in whose band he would again play with Dizzy Gillespie, Big Joe Turner, Lena Horne, Dexter Gordon (1944–46), and Hot Lips Page (1947). In the 1950s White played with Harvey Davis and then with Wilbur De Paris, remaining with the latter until 1964. In the 1960s he freelanced with Eddie Barefield (1968), among others, and was working with Jonah Jones at the time of his death in 1971.

== Bibliography ==
- Eugene Chadbourne, Sonny White at Allmusic
