= Please Be Kind =

1938 song by Saul Chaplin and Sammy Cahn

"Please Be Kind" is a 1938 American song composed by Saul Chaplin with lyrics by Sammy Cahn. Popular recordings that year were by Mildred Bailey and the Red Norvo Orchestra; Bob Crosby & His Orchestra (vocal by Kay Weber); and by Benny Goodman & His Orchestra (vocal by Martha Tilton).

== Notable recordings ==
- Ann-Margret on her 1961 debut album, And Here She Is ... Ann-Margret
- Mildred Bailey - recorded February 10, 1938 for Brunswick Records (catalog No. 8088).
- June Christy - Cool Christy (2002).
- Ella Fitzgerald - Songs in a Mellow Mood (1954) and the MCA release Ella & Ellis (1983).
- The Four Freshmen - Golden Anniversary Celebrations (2001), First Affair/Voices In Fun (2002)
- Benny Goodman & His Orchestra (vocal by Martha Tilton - recorded March 9, 1938 for Victor Records (catalog No. 25814).
- Peggy Lee - for her album The Man I Love (1957)
- Johnny Mathis - included in his album Open Fire, Two Guitars (1959)
- Art Tatum - (1955) included in The Complete Pablo Group Masterpieces (1990)
- Jimmy Scott - - recorded on October 3, 1956 for Savoy Records (catalog No.1507).
- Carmen McRae - Book of Ballads (1958)
- Django Reinhardt and the Quintet of the Hot Club of France with Stéphane Grappelli - recorded in London on September 1, 1938 for Decca Records.
- Frank Sinatra - Sinatra-Basie: An Historic Musical First (1962)
- Jeri Southern - A Prelude to a Kiss (1958).
- Rosemary Squires - a single release in 1958.
- Maxine Sullivan - recorded on March 1, 1938 for Victor Records (catalog No. 25802).
- Sarah Vaughan - Vaughan and Violins (1958)
