= Margaret Johnson (pianist) =

American jazz musician

Margaret Johnson (1918–1939) was an American jazz pianist who accompanied many famous jazz musicians of the 1930s.

According to the Kansas City Call, she was born Margaret Lucille Johnson on September 28, 1918 in Chanute, Kansas. She was a child prodigy on piano. She moved to Kansas City, Kansas in the early 1930s. Johnson attended Northeast Junior High School and graduated from Sumner High School in 1935. As a young teenager her style was compared to Mary Lou Williams. As a teenager, she played in the bands of Harlan Leonard on tour. At the age of 15, she had already formed her own group. In 1936 she took over for Count Basie when he left his Orchestra for an engagement in Chicago. She also substituted for Mary Lou Williams in Andy Kirk's band in New York. Later, she worked with Clarence Williams, Bubber Miley, Thomas Morris, Louis Armstrong and Sidney Bechet. She can also be heard on four tracks that Billie Holiday's orchestra recorded in September 1938 with Lester Young.

According to The Rough Guide to Jazz, Johnson was one of the pioneering female figures in jazz. Her piano style was tasteful and described as "effortless" by those who heard her live. She was nicknamed "Countess" and "Queenie". She was a powerful musician whose style recalls both Basie, Earl Hines, and Mary Lou Williams. She died of tuberculosis on July 6, 1939.
