= Alberta Nichols =

- Born: Alberta Nichols; December 3, 1898; Lincoln, Illinois, U.S.
- Died: February 4, 1957 (aged 58) Hollywood, California, U.S.
- Occupation: Composer

Alberta Nichols (December 3, 1898 – February 4, 1957) was a popular songwriter of the 1930s and 1940s. Together with her husband, lyricist Mann Holiner, they composed over 100 songs, of which their most famous were "Until the Real Thing Comes Along" and "A Love Like Ours".

== Biography ==
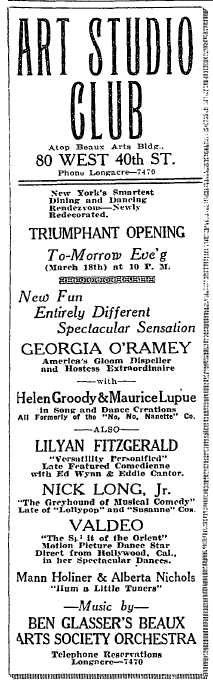
Advertisement in New York Times, March 17, 1926

Nichols was born in Lincoln, Illinois, on December 3, 1898 and studied piano at the Louisville Conservatory with George Copeland and Alfred Calzin. Her career spanned writing for vaudeville, radio, musical theater and the movies. In 1931, Nichols and Holiner wrote songs for the Broadway revue Rhapsody in Black, including "Till the Real Thing Comes Along", an early version of the 1936 song "Until the Real Thing Comes Along". Alec Wilder, in American Popular Song, speculated that Nichols was the composer of the melody. In 1936, the song was substantially rewritten by composer Saul Chaplin, lyricist Sammy Cahn, and saxophonist L.E. Freeman, and the song received a notable recording by Billie Holiday in 1942. Holiday was a close friend of the Nichols-Holiners.

Nichols and Holiner also wrote the music for other Broadway shows including Blackbirds of 1933 and Angela, which starred Jeanette MacDonald.

The song "A Love Like Ours", considered by Virginia Grattan to be one of the best songs of the duo, was in the film Two Girls and a Sailor starring Van Johnson and June Allyson.

Other songs from the Nichols-Holiner team inlcuded "There Never Was a Town like Paris," "Sing a Little Tune," "You Can't Stop Me from Loving You," and "Why Shouldn't It Happen to Us?" (the latter published in 1945, and recorded by Frank Sinatra).

Alberta Nichols died in Hollywood on February 4, 1957, at the age of 58.

== Music ==
Songs

- "A Love Like Ours" (Two Girls and a Sailor)
- "Until the Real Thing Comes Along"
- "There Never Was a Town like Paris"
- "Sing a Little Tune"
- "You Can't Stop Me from Loving You"
- "Why Shouldn't It Happen to Us?"
- "I'm Walkin' The Chalk Line"
- "Your Mother's Son-In-Law"
- "I Just Couldn't Take it Baby"
- "Sing a Little Tune"
- "I Can't Believe its True" (Angela)
- "Maybe So" (Angela)
- "The Regal Romp" (Angela)

Broadway shows that featured Nichols' music

- Gay Paree (1926)
- Angela
- Luckee Girl
- Rhapsody in Black (1931)

Movies that featured Nichols' music

- Blackbirds of 1934 (1934)
- Two Girls and a Sailor (1944)

== Bibliography ==
- American Society of Composers, Authors and Publishers (1981). The ASCAP Biographical Dictionary of Composers, Authors and Publishers. RR Bowker, Lic. ISBN 0-8352-1283-1.
- Cohen, Aaron (1987). International Encyclopedia of Women Composers, 2nd Ed. Books & Music USA. ISBN 0-9617485-2-4.
- Laurence, Anya (1979). Women of Notes: 1,000 Women Composers Born Before 1900. Rosen Publishing Group. ISBN 0-8239-0463-6.
