= By Special Request (Carmen McRae album) =

Studio album by Carmen McRae
- Released: 1955
- Recorded: June 14 and 16, 1955
- Genre: Vocal jazz
- Length: 33:05
- Label: Decca

Carmen McRae chronology
Carmen McRae (1955)	By Special Request (1955)	Torchy! (1956)

By Special Request is a 1955 studio album by American jazz singer Carmen McRae, her first release on Decca Records. In some songs, McRae is joined by the Matt Matthews quintet, while others feature pianist Dick Katz, guitarist Mundell Lowe, bassist Wendell Marshall, and her ex-husband Kenny Clarke on drums. McRae plays piano on "Supper Time", and Billy Strayhorn plays piano on his own composition, "Something to Live For".

== Critical reception ==
Professional ratings
Review scores
Source	Rating
Allmusic	4/5 stars
The Encyclopedia of Popular Music	3/5 stars

Scott Yanow of AllMusic wrote in his review that "although MacRae's voice is higher than it would be and her style is not as recognizable, she was already a top-notch singer at this early stage." Music critic Gary Giddins also noted that when he first heard the album in the 1970s, he could hardly believe it: "a whole other Carmen, from the supper-club era, singing in a lilting, oddly sweet, even buttery voice."

== Track listing ==
1. "Give Me the Simple Life" (Rube Bloom, Harry Ruby) – 2:20
2. "Sometimes I'm Happy" (Irving Caesar, Vincent Youmans) – 2:30
3. "Love Is Here to Stay" (George Gershwin, Ira Gershwin) – 2:38
4. "Something to Live For" (Duke Ellington, Billy Strayhorn) – 3:11
5. "I Can't Get Started" (Vernon Duke, Ira Gershwin) – 3:16
6. "Yardbird Suite" (Charlie Parker) – 1:56
7. "Just One of Those Things" (Cole Porter) – 2:38
8. "This Will Make You Laugh" (Irene Higginbotham) – 3:21
9. "My One and Only Love" (Robert Mellin, Guy Wood) – 3:08
10. "I'll Remember April" (Gene de Paul, Patricia Johnston, Don Raye) – 2:36
11. "Supper Time" (Irving Berlin) – 2:57
12. "You Took Advantage of Me" (Lorenz Hart, Richard Rodgers) – 2:34

== Personnel ==
- Carmen McRae – vocals, piano (11)
- Matt Matthews – accordion (1, 6, 9, 10, 12)
- Wendell Marshall – double bass (except 11)
- Kenny Clarke – drums (1, 6, 9, 10, 12)
- Herbie Mann – flute (1, 6, 9, 10, 12)
- Mundell Lowe – guitar (except 4)
- Dick Katz – piano (2, 3, 5, 7, 8)
- Billy Strayhorn – piano (4)
