= Sugar: That Sugar Baby O'Mine =

"Sugar", also known as "That Sugar Baby o' Mine", is a popular song by Maceo Pinkard, his wife Edna Alexander and Sidney D. Mitchell. Recorded by Ethel Waters on February 20, 1926, it soon achieved chart success.

The song is not to be confused with a 1927 song titled "Sugar", written by Jack Yellen, Milton Ager, Frank Crum and Red Nichols.

The song has been recorded by numerous artists, and is considered a jazz standard. Artists that have recorded the song include Adrian Rollini, Louis Armstrong, Earl Hines, Fats Waller, Bing Crosby, Benny Goodman, Count Basie, Fletcher Henderson, Billie Holiday, Teddy Wilson, Gene Krupa, Kenny Davern, Ralph Sutton, The Manhattan Transfer, Linnzi Zaorski, and Lee Wiley.

Vic Damone enjoyed chart success with the song in 1953 reaching the No 13 spot.

== Film appearances ==
The song has been included in numerous films:

- Second Chorus (1940), as an instrumental
- Pete Kelly's Blues (1955), performed by Peggy Lee and Matty Matlock's Dixielanders
- Stardust Memories (1980)
- Gorillas in the Mist (1988)
- Capote (2005)
- Sophie Scholl: Die Letzten Tage (2005)

== See also ==
- List of 1920s jazz standards
