= Ella Sings Gershwin =

Studio album by Ella Fitzgerald
- Released: 1950
- Recorded: September 11–12, 1950
- Venue: New York
- Genre: Jazz
- Length: 25:16
- Label: Decca
- Producer: Milt Gabler

Ella Fitzgerald chronology
Ella Sings Gershwin (1950)	Songs in a Mellow Mood (1954)

Professional ratings
Review scores
Source	Rating
AllMusic	4/5 stars
Encyclopedia of Popular Music	4/5 stars

Ella Sings Gershwin is a 1950 studio album by Ella Fitzgerald, accompanied by the pianist Ellis Larkins. Issued on DL5300 on the Decca label, Originally on 10" vinyl, which preceded album releases on 12" vinyl, it featured eight tracks.

The complete album was combined with Fitzgerald's 1954 album Songs in a Mellow Mood and re-issued on CD in 1994 by MCA Records on the GRP Jazz label under the title Pure Ella.

Fitzgerald released two other albums of all Gershwin material, Ella Fitzgerald Sings the George and Ira Gershwin Songbook (1959) and Nice Work If You Can Get It (1983).

== Track listing ==
For the 1950 Decca Records 10" LP; Decca DL 5300

Side one

1. "Someone to Watch Over Me" - 3:13
2. "My One and Only" - 3:13
3. "But Not for Me" - 3:12
4. "Looking for a Boy" - 3:06

Side two

1. "I've Got a Crush on You" - 3:13
2. "How Long Has This Been Going On?" - 3:14
3. "Maybe" - 3:21
4. "Soon" - 2:44

All music composed by George Gershwin and all lyrics written by Ira Gershwin.

Bonus Tracks; Issued on 1956 Decca DL 8378

5. "Nice Work If You Can Get It" – 2:33
6. "Oh, Lady Be Good" – 3:04
11. "I'm Just A Lucky So And So" (Duke Ellington, Mack David) – 2:52
12. "I Didn't Mean A Word I Said" (Harold Adamson, Jimmy McHugh) – 3:15

== Personnel ==
- Ella Fitzgerald - vocals
- Ellis Larkins - piano

== In popular culture ==
- This album was referenced by Dr. Frasier Crane in the episode "Something about Dr Mary" of the popular NBC sitcom.
