= Edna Alexander (composer) =

American singer and music composer

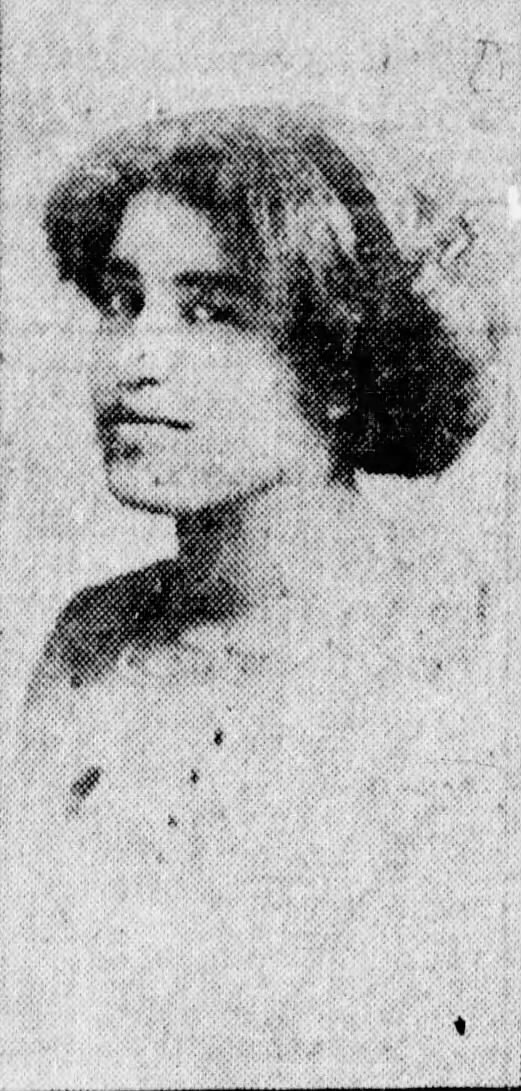
- Alexander in 1911
- Born: Edna Belle Alexander; March 19, 1892; Ottumwa, Iowa, U.S.
- Died: 1972 (aged 79–80)
- Other name: Alex Belledna

Edna Belle Alexander (1892–1972) was an American soprano singer and music composer. In addition to performing, she became a songwriter and published music under the name Alex Belledna.

== Biography ==
Alexander was born in Ottumwa, Iowa on March 19, 1892 to parents Mary Ann (née Hamilton) (1868–1916) and Price Alexander. Edna had eight siblings, including four sisters and four brothers, named James Leonard, Archie A., Mary Colleen Jones, Harriet Louise, Leland Russell, Harold Creighton, Ida Helen, and Doris Elaine. Her brother, Archie Alexander, later became governor of the Virgin Islands. She attended North Des Moines High School, graduating in 1911.

While living in Des Moines, Iowa, she was a member of the Des Moines Negro Lyceum and sang at various local events. In November 1911, she married William Beach at her parents' home in Highland Park, Iowa. Two years later, she filed for divorce from William on the grounds of "cruel and inhumane treatment, and adultery".

Alexander later married fellow musician and songwriter Maceo Pinkard in 1917. She used the pseudonym Alex Belledna for songwriting credit work, including on pieces she composed together with her husband. Under the name "Alex Belledna", she composed the song "It's Right Here for You (If You Don't Get It—Tain't No Fault of Mine)", which was included on the 1920 record Crazy Blues, recorded by Okeh Records and sung by Mamie Smith. A rarity for the early 1900s, the song was created by a team of black women, as Alexander co-wrote the song with lyricist Marion Dickerson.

Alexander and her husband collaborated on the 1929 musical novelty show Pansy which had an unfavorable reception upon its debut and quickly closed, despite a well received song performed by Bessie Smith. The play opened on Broadway on May 14, 1929, at the Belmont Theatre and ran for three performances, closing on May 16, 1929. Alexander and her husband also owned a music publishing company under their names.

Alexander died in 1972. Her music was later included in the musical retrospective, One Mo' Time, which ran from 1979 to 1987, and the 2002 show Blues in the Night.

== Discography ==
- "Sugar: That Sugar Baby O'Mine" (1926), co-wrote. Became a hit on an Ethel Waters recording.
- "Granny" (1919) - composer, recorded by numerous artists
- "It's Right Here for You" (1920) - composer; debuted in vaudeville with Sophie Tucker, recorded by Mamie Smith and others
- "Tain't Nothing But Jazz" (1921) - co-wrote with Maceo Pinkard and William Tracey
- "Make Those Naughty Eyes Behave" (1925)
- "Does My Sweetie Do—And How" (1925) - co-wrote with Sidney Holden and Maceo Pinkard
- "Kitchen Man" (1929) - co-wrote with Andy Razaf, recorded by Bessie Smith
- "Squealin' Pig Blues"
