= Irene Kitchings =

American pianist, bandleader, and songwriter (1908–1975)

- Born: Violet Irene Armstrong; 1908
- Died: March 4, 1975 (aged 66–67)
- Other name: Irene Wilson
- Occupations: Jazz pianist, band leader, songwriter

Irene Armstrong Wilson Kitchings (c. 1908 - March 4, 1975) was an African-American jazz pianist, band leader, and songwriter. She performed as both a solo act and with bands. Kitchings co-wrote the songs "Some Other Spring", "Ghost of Yesterday", and "I'm Pulling Through", all of which were recorded by Billie Holiday.

== Life and career ==
Irene Kitchings was born Violet Irene Armstrong in Marietta, Ohio. Her birth year is either 1903 or 1908. As a child, she lived in Muncie, Indiana, with her parents and sister, Grace. She moved to Detroit at age 13 to live with an aunt. Her mother taught her to play piano as a child.

By age 18, Kitchings was living in Chicago and performing in jazz clubs as both a solo jazz pianist and a member of various bands. She sometimes used the stage name Irene Armstrong Edie. One band led by Kitchings included musicians Budd Johnson, Walter Fuller, and Dolly Jones.

Kitchings married jazz pianist Teddy Wilson around 1931. The couple moved to New York in 1934 where Wilson joined the Benny Goodman Trio. Kitchings ceased performing after moving to New York.

Kitchings met and became friends with Billie Holiday after the two women were introduced by Wilson. After Kitchings divorced Wilson, Holiday introduced her to songwriter and composer, Arthur Herzog, Jr.. Together, Herzog and Kitchings wrote "Some Other Spring", a song that was first recorded by Holiday. Two of their other songs, "Ghost of Yesterday," and "I'm Pulling Through", were also recorded by Holiday.

Kitchings, who suffered from Eale's Disease, fell ill and moved to Cleveland to stay with an aunt. While in Cleveland, she met and married Elden Kitchings, learned to play the organ, and became active in her church.

== Death and legacy ==
Kitchings died in 1975.

Writers and historians often confuse Kitchings with Irene Higgenbotham, an African-American songwriter and pianist who also wrote songs that were performed by Billie Holiday.

Jazz vocalist Carmen McRae credited Kitchings as a mentor.
