= Billie's Blues =

Single by Billie Holiday
- A-side: "Summertime"
- Released: 1936
- Recorded: July 10, 1936
- Genre: Blues
- Length: 2:37
- Label: Vocalion
- Songwriter(s): Billie Holiday
- Producer(s): Bernie Hanighen

"Billie's Blues" is a blues song written by jazz singer Billie Holiday, composing it just before being recorded in a session on July 10, 1936. According to the article in Melody Maker, on August 1, 1936:

"Billie Holiday has her first solo recording at Brunswick last week...Bernie Hanighen,...suggested making a blues, so the blues it was". This blues was Billie's Blues.

== Recording session ==
- "Did I Remember?"
- "Summertime"
- "No Regrets"
- "Billie's Blues"

Billie Holiday and Her Orchestra, (Bunny Berigan, trumpet; Artie Shaw, clarinet; Joe Bushkin, piano; Dick McDonough, guitar; Arthur "Pete" Peterson, bass; Cozy Cole, drums)

== Notable cover versions ==
- Blossom Dearie (1957)
- Carmen McRae (1986)
- Mary Coughlan (2000)
- Jazz at the Philharmonic (2004)

== Resource ==
Vladimir, Bogdanov. All Music Guide to the Blues: The Definitive Guide to the Blues, Backbeat Books (2003), p. 240, ISBN 0-87930-736-6
