= Buck Washington =

American musician and pianist

- Born: Ford Lee Washington; October 16, 1903; Louisville, Kentucky
- Died: January 31, 1955 (aged 51); New York City, U.S.
- Years active: 1910s–1954
- Known for: Half of Buck and Bubbles duo
- Spouse: Flash Amber Vincson (m. 1927–1955)

Ford Lee "Buck" Washington (October 16, 1903 – January 31, 1955) was an American vaudeville performer, pianist, and singer. He was best known as half of the duo Buck and Bubbles, who were the first black artists to appear on television, with John W. Bubbles, his performance partner for 40 years.

== Career ==
Washington was born in Louisville, Kentucky. He and Bubbles (born John W. Sublett) first began working together in the 1910s, while Washington was in his teens. Their duo was known as "Buck and Bubbles." Bubbles was primarily a tap dancer while Washington sang and played stride piano. They were so popular that the duo moved to Manhattan, New York City in September 1919. By the late 1920s they were on Broadway. They played together in the Columbia Theater and the Palace, performing with Eddie Cantor, Al Jolson, and Danny Kaye. They were on the Ziegfeld Follies of 1931. They also became the first black artists to perform at the Radio City Music Hall. They toured Europe in the 1930s and appeared on television and in films, including Calling All Stars (1937) and Cabin in the Sky (1942). The Buck and Bubbles act was represented by Nat Nazarro. "Buck and Bubbles" performed live in the first scheduled 'high definition' (240-line) television program on November 2, 1936, at Alexandra Palace, London, for the BBC, becoming the first black artists on television anywhere in the world. In 1927, when Buck and Bubbles were performing at the Sunset Café, Buck developed a working relationship and friendship with Louis Armstrong.

As a pianist, Washington also did sessions with jazz musicians such as Louis Armstrong (1930), Bessie Smith (1933), and Coleman Hawkins (1934). In November 1933 Washington played the piano on "Your Mother's Son-In-Law", Billie Holiday's first recording. He also played trumpet, though he only made home recordings on the instrument. He continued working with Bubbles until 1953, and in 1953-1954 worked with Timmie Rogers and Jonah Jones. He died on January 31, 1955, in New York City.

== Family ==
On August 23, 1927, in Chicago, Washington married Flash Amber Vincson (1902–1975). One of her younger sisters, Bobbie Vincent (née Bobbye Vincson; 1906–1978), was a singer and dancer who performed in the 1925 production of Chocolate Kiddies during its inaugural European tour.
