= Deane Kincaide =

American jazz musician (1911–1992)

Robert Deane Kincaide (March 18, 1911 – August 14, 1992) was an American jazz reedman.

Kincaide was born in Houston, Texas and raised in Decatur, Illinois. He began playing professionally and working as an arranger in the early 1930s. He worked with Wingy Manone in 1932, then took a job with Ben Pollack from 1933 to 1935, also arranging for Benny Goodman on the side. He joined Bob Crosby's group in 1935, and worked with Woody Herman and Manone again; at the end of the decade he worked briefly with Tommy Dorsey. In the first half of the 1940s he worked with Joe Marsala, Glenn Miller, Ray Noble, and Muggsy Spanier. He served in the United States Navy during World War II, playing in a ship's band on the USS Franklin (CV-13). He joined Ray McKinley's band in 1946, working with him until 1950. From the 1950s until the early 1980s, Kincaide worked primarily as an arranger for television.

He died, aged 81, in St. Cloud, Florida.

== Other sources ==
- "Deane Kincaide". The New Grove Dictionary of Jazz. Second edition, ed. Barry Kernfeld.
