= Ellis Larkins =

American jazz pianist

- Born: May 15, 1923
- Origin: Baltimore, Maryland, U.S.
- Died: September 29, 2002 (aged 79)
- Genres: Jazz
- Occupation: Musician
- Instrument: Piano

Ellis Larkins (May 15, 1923 – September 29, 2002) was an American jazz pianist born in Baltimore, Maryland, known for his two recordings with Ella Fitzgerald: the albums Ella Sings Gershwin (1950) and Songs in a Mellow Mood (1954). He was also the pianist on the first solo sides by singer Chris Connor on her album Chris (1954).

Larkins was the first African American to attend the Peabody Conservatory of Music, an institute in Baltimore. He began his professional playing career in New York City after moving there to attend the Juilliard School. While still at Juilliard, Larkins performed jazz piano with guitarist Billy Moore at Café Society Uptown and over the next ten years in his own groups, or in support of, clarinetist Edmond Hall and singers Helen Humes and Mildred Bailey. He recorded with Coleman Hawkins, and Dicky Wells in the 1940s. In the 1950s, he recorded with Ella Fitzgerald, Ruby Braff, and Beverly Kenney. His 1960s work included recordings or performances with Eartha Kitt, Joe Williams, Georgia Gibbs and Harry Belafonte.

Though he was best known as an accompanist, Larkins recorded several solo albums in the 1950s. In the 1970s, he performed regularly at several New York venues, including Gregory's, a small bar on the Upper East Side.

== Discography ==
=== As leader ===
Year recorded	Title	Label	Notes
1952	Blues in the Night	Decca	Solo piano; DL 5391, subtitled The Melodies of Harold Arlen
1954	Perfume and Rain	Storyville	Solo piano
1956	Do Nothin’ ‘Til You Hear From Me	Storyville	Duo with Beverly Peer (bass)
1956	Manhattan at Midnight	Decca	Trio, with Art Ryerson (guitar), Beverly Peer (bass)
1958	Blue and Sentimental	Decca	Some tracks duo, with Joe Benjamin (bass); some tracks quartet
1970	Lost in the Wood	Stanyan	Trio, with Al McKibbon (bass), Panama Francis (drums)
1977	A Smooth One	Black & Blue	Trio, with George Duvivier (bass), J. C. Heard (drums)
1990	Ellis Larkins	DGTL	Some tracks solo piano; some tracks trio, with Bill Popp (bass), Jackie Williams (drums)
1992	Ellis Larkins at Maybeck	Concord Jazz	Solo piano; in concert

=== As sideman ===
With Ruby Braff

- Ellis Larkins & Ruby Braff: Duets Volume 1, (Vanguard, 1955 [1991])
- Ellis Larkins & Ruby Braff: Duets Volume 2, (Vanguard, 1955 [2000])
- Ruby Braff and Ellis Larkins: 2 Part Inventions in Jazz, (Vanguard, 10-inch LP, 1955) – reissued as Ruby Braff/Ellis Larkins: Pocket Full of Dreams, (Vanguard, 1957) & on the Duets CDs
- Ruby Braff and Ellis Larkins: The Grand Reunion, (Chiaroscuro, 1972) – CD reissue, 1999
- Ruby Braff and Ellis Larkins: Calling Berlin, Vol. 1 (Arbors, 1994 [1995])
- Ruby Braff and Ellis Larkins: Calling Berlin, Vol. 2 (Arbors, 1994 [1996])

With Anita Kert Ellis

- A Legend Sings (Red Onion, 1979)

With Ella Fitzgerald

- Ella Sings Gershwin (Decca, 1950)
- Songs in a Mellow Mood (Decca, 1954)
- "You Turned the Tables on Me", "Nice Work If You Can Get It", "I've Got a Crush on You" on Newport Jazz Festival: Live at Carnegie Hall (Pablo, 1973)

With Beverly Kenney

- Sings for Playboys (Decca, 1958)

With Sonny Stitt

- What's New!!! (Roulette, 1966)
- I Keep Comin' Back! (Roulette, 1966)

With Joe Williams

- That Holiday Feelin (Verve, 1990)
