= Shirley Clay =

American jazz trumpeter (born 1951)

Shirley Clay (died February 7, 1951) was an American jazz trumpeter.

Clay, who was of African American heritage, gained his early start in St. Louis, Missouri while a teenager, about 1920. He toured with John Williams's Synco Jazzers early in the decade and then moved to Chicago, where he recorded with Louis Armstrong in 1927 and worked with Carroll Dickerson and Clifford King.

In the late 1920s and 1930s, he worked as a studio musician, playing with Earl Hines, Ma Rainey, Billie Holiday, and the Boswell Sisters. He played with Don Redman in the middle of the 1930s and spent time with Benny Goodman, Ben Pollack, and Claude Hopkins in the latter half of the decade. In the 1940s, he spent time with Hines again, Horace Henderson, Leon Abbey, Cootie Williams, and Cab Calloway. He also recorded with The Mills Brothers. From 1944 to 1951 he led his own band which included Edgar Battle among its sidemen; he also played as a sideman in his own right with Manzie Johnson and Harry Dial.
