= Sammy Cahn =

American lyricist, songwriter, musician (1913–1993)

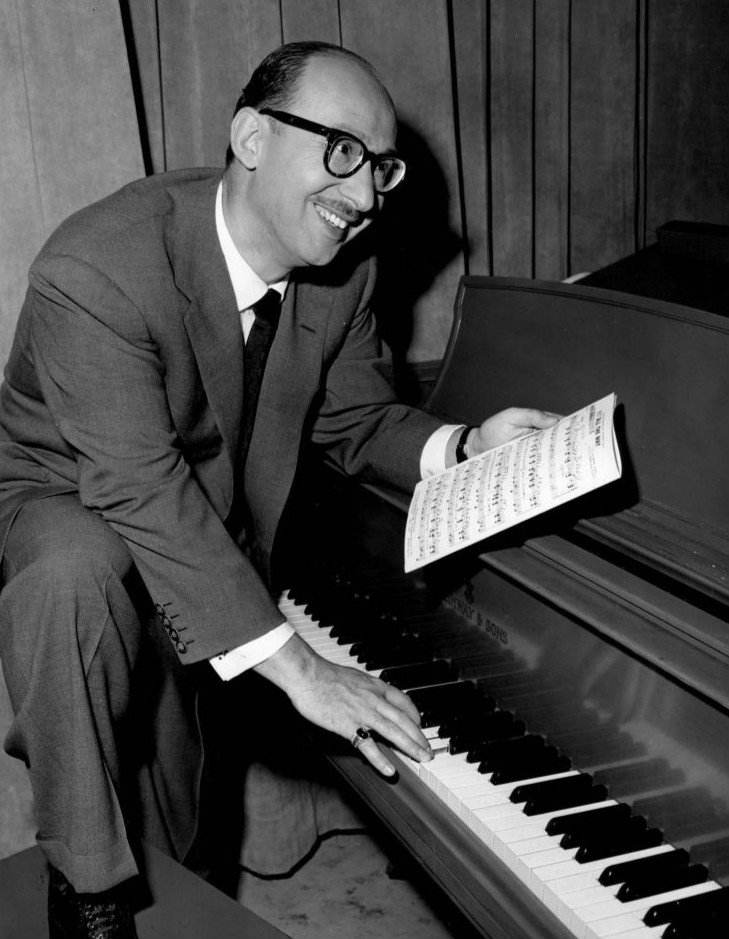
- Cahn circa 1958

Background information
- Born: Samuel Cohen; June 18, 1913; Manhattan, New York City, U.S.
- Died: January 15, 1993 (aged 79) Los Angeles, California, U.S.
- Occupations: Lyricist, musician
- Instruments: Piano, Violin

Samuel Cohen (June 18, 1913 – January 15, 1993), known professionally as Sammy Cahn, was an American lyricist, songwriter, and musician. He is best known for his romantic lyrics to films and Broadway songs, as well as stand-alone songs premiered by recording companies in the Greater Los Angeles area. He and his collaborators had a series of hit recordings with Frank Sinatra during the singer's tenure at Capitol Records, but also enjoyed hits with Dean Martin, Doris Day and many others. He played the piano and violin, and won an Oscar four times for his songs, including the popular hit "Three Coins in the Fountain".

Among his most enduring songs is "Let It Snow! Let It Snow! Let It Snow!", co-written with Jule Styne in 1945.

== Life and career ==
Cahn was born Samuel Cohen on the Lower East Side of Manhattan in New York City, the only son (he had four sisters) of Abraham and Elka Reiss Cohen, who were Jewish immigrants from Galicia, then ruled by Austria-Hungary. His sisters, Sadye, Pearl, Florence, and Evelyn, all studied the piano. His mother did not approve of Sammy studying it though, feeling that the piano was a woman's instrument, so he took violin lessons. After three lessons and following his bar mitzvah, he joined a small dixieland band called Pals of Harmony, which toured the Catskill Mountains in the summer and also played at private parties. This new dream of Cahn's destroyed any hopes his parents had for him to be a professional man.

Some of the side jobs he had were playing violin in a theater-pit orchestra, working at a meat-packing plant, serving as a movie-house usher, tinsmith, freight-elevator operator, restaurant cashier, and porter at a bindery. At age 16, he was watching vaudeville, of which he had been a fan since the age of 10, and he witnessed Jack Osterman singing a ballad Osterman had written. Cahn was inspired and, on his way home from the theater, wrote his first lyric, which was titled "Like Niagara Falls, I'm Falling for You – Baby." Years later he would say "I think a sense of vaudeville is very strong in anything I do, anything I write. They even call it 'a vaudeville finish,' and it comes through in many of my songs. Just sing the end of 'All the Way' or 'Three Coins in the Fountain'—'Make it mine, make it mine, MAKE IT MINE!' If you let people know they should applaud, they will applaud."

Much of Cahn's early work was written in partnership with Saul Chaplin. They first met when Cahn invited Chaplin to audition for him at the Henry Street Settlement. Cahn said, "I'd learned a few chords on the piano, maybe two, so I'd already tried to write a song. Something I called 'Shake Your Head from Side to Side'." Billed simply as "Cahn and Chaplin" (in the manner of "Rodgers and Hart"), they composed witty special material for Warner Brothers' musical short subjects, filmed at Warners' Vitaphone studio in Brooklyn, New York.

"There was a legendary outfit on West 46th Street, Beckman and Pransky ... they were the MCA, the William Morris of the Borscht Belt. I got a room in their offices, and we started writing special material. For anybody who'd have us—at whatever price." They did not make much money, but they did work with up-and-comers Milton Berle, Danny Kaye, Phil Silvers, and Bob Hope.

One of his childhood friends was Lou Levy, who had gone from neighborhood bum to blackface dancer with the Jimmie Lunceford Orchestra.

Lyric writing has always been a thrilling adventure for me, and something I've done with the kind of ease that only comes with joy! From the beginning the fates have conspired to help my career. Lou Levy, the eminent music publisher, lived around the corner and we met the day I was leaving my first music publisher's office. This led to a partnership that has lasted many years. Lou and I wrote "Rhythm is Our Business," material for Jimmie Lunceford's orchestra, which became my first ASCAP copyright. I'd been churning out "special lyrics" for special occasions for years and this helped facilitate my tremendous speed with lyric writing. Many might have written these lyrics better—but none faster! Glen Gray and Tommy Dorsey became regular customers and through Tommy came the enduring and perhaps most satisfying relationship of my lyric writing career – Frank Sinatra.

The song became the Orchestra's signature song. The duo then worked for Glen Gray's Casa Loma Orchestra and their premiere at Paramount Theatre. They also worked for Andy Kirk and his Clouds of Joy and they wrote "Until the Real Thing Comes Along".

Cahn wrote the lyrics to "Love and Marriage," later used as the ironic theme song for the FOX TV show Married... with Children. The song originally debuted in a 1955 television production of Our Town, and won an Emmy Award in 1956. This was only one of many songs that Cahn and Jimmy Van Heusen wrote for Frank Sinatra. They were "almost considered to be his personal songwriters."

Cahn contributed lyrics for two otherwise unrelated films about the Land of Oz, Journey Back to Oz (1971) and The Wizard of Oz (1982). The former were composed with Van Heusen, the latter with Allen Byrns, Joe Hisaishi, and Yuichiro Oda.

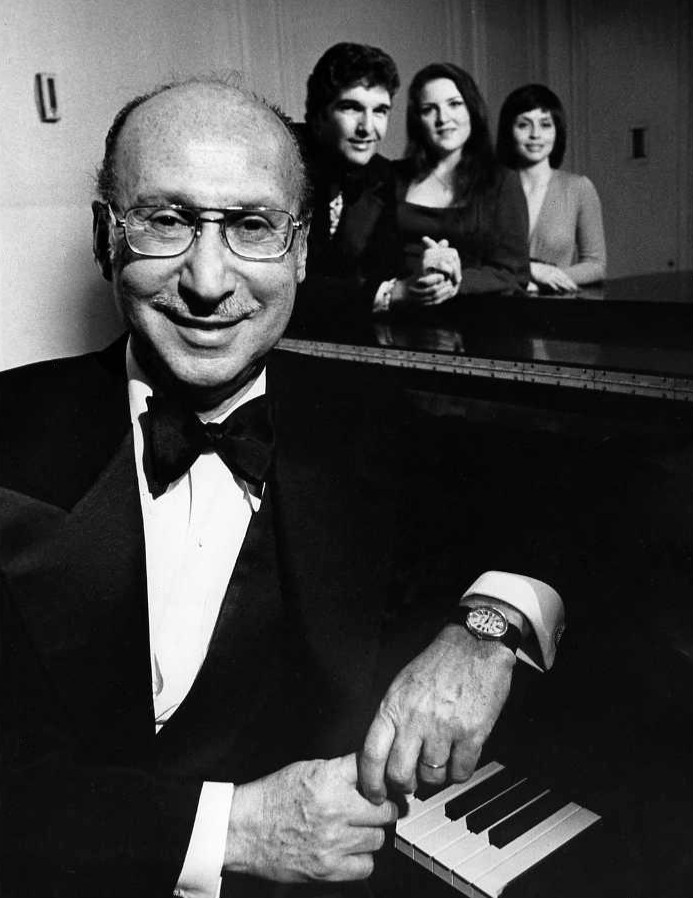
Cahn (far left) in 1974

Cahn became a member of the Songwriters Hall of Fame in 1972. He later took over the presidency of that organization from his friend Johnny Mercer when Mercer became ill. While not possessing a great voice, Cahn sang concerts of his own music with pianist and composer Harper MacKay serving as his musical director and accompanist.

=== Personal life ===
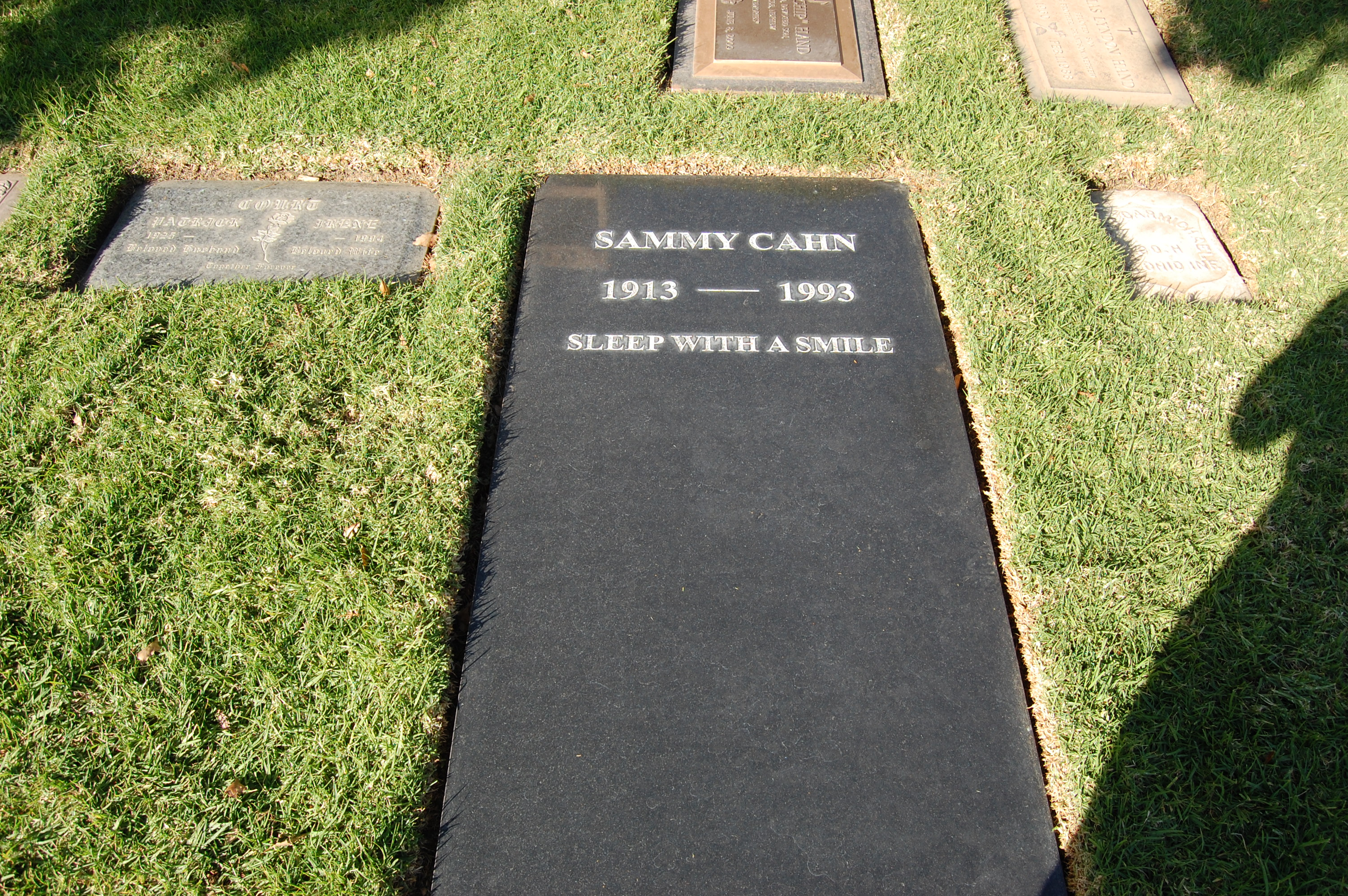
Cahn's grave

He changed his last name from Cohen to Kahn to avoid confusion with comic and MGM actor Sammy Cohen and again from Kahn to Cahn to avoid confusion with lyricist Gus Kahn.

He was married twice: first in 1945 to vocalist and former Goldwyn girl Gloria Delson, with whom he had two children. They divorced after 18 years of marriage. Gloria went on to marry world-class tennis player Mike Franks in 1965. In 1970, Cahn married Virginia (Tita) Curtis, a former fashion coordinator for the clothes designer Donald Brooks. The couple divorced around 1982, then remarried and the marriage lasted until his death.

He was the father of Laurie Cahn and jazz/fusion guitarist Steve Khan who, early in his career, changed the spelling of his last name to Khan in order to "create a separate identity from [his] famous father" and because he was "so hurt and angry with him for so many childhood things."

Cahn died on January 15, 1993, at the age of 79 in Los Angeles, California from heart failure. His remains were interred in the Westwood Village Memorial Park Cemetery.

== Honors, awards and legacy ==
Over the course of his career, he was nominated for 31 Academy Awards, five Golden Globe Awards, and an Emmy Award. He also received a Grammy Award nomination, with Van Heusen, for Best Original Score Written for a Motion Picture or Television Show for the film Robin and the 7 Hoods. He has won the Christopher Award, the Outer Critics Circle Award, and the Theatre World Award (for Best Newcomer to Broadway).

In 1988, the Sammy Film Music Awards (the "Sammy"), an annual award for movie songs and scores, was started in his honor. When notified by Roger Lee Hall, Cahn said he was "flattered and honored" that these awards were named after him. He was chosen because he had received more Academy Award nominations than any other songwriter, and also because he received four Oscars for his song lyrics.

In 1993, taking up the sentiments expressed in the song, "High Hopes," the Cahn estate established the "High Hopes Fund" at the Joslin Diabetes Center in Boston. The former Joslin patient and songwriter's goal was to provide hope and encouragement to kids with diabetes while supporting research into the causes of the disease.

The lyrics he wrote for Sinatra are the subject of a chapter in Gilbert Gigliotti's A Storied Singer: Frank Sinatra as Literary Conceit, "Come [Fly, Dance, and Waltz with] Us on Equal Terms: The Whitmanesque Sinatra of Sammy Cahn," published by Greenwood Press in 2002.

== Music ==
Cahn wrote lyrics for many songs, including:

Academy Award winners

- 1954 – "Three Coins in the Fountain" (music by Jule Styne) introduced by Frank Sinatra in the film Three Coins in the Fountain.
- 1957 – "All the Way" (music by Jimmy Van Heusen) introduced by Frank Sinatra in the film The Joker Is Wild.
- 1959 – "High Hopes" (music by Van Heusen) introduced by Frank Sinatra and Eddie Hodges in the film A Hole in the Head.
- 1963 – "Call Me Irresponsible" (music by Van Heusen) introduced by Jackie Gleason in the film Papa's Delicate Condition.

Academy Award nominees

- 1942 – "I've Heard That Song Before" (music by Styne) from the film Youth on Parade.
- 1944 – "I'll Walk Alone" (music by Styne) from the film Follow the Boys.
- 1945 – "Anywhere" (music by Styne) from the film Tonight and Every Night.
- 1945 – "I Fall in Love Too Easily" (music by Styne) introduced by Frank Sinatra in the film Anchors Aweigh.
- 1948 – "It's Magic" (music by Styne) introduced by Doris Day in the film Romance on the High Seas.
- 1949 – "It's a Great Feeling" (music by Styne) introduced by Doris Day in the film It's a Great Feeling.
- 1950 – "Be My Love" (music by Nicholas Brodszky) introduced by Mario Lanza and Kathryn Grayson in the film The Toast of New Orleans.
- 1951 – "Wonder Why" (music by Brodszky) introduced by Jane Powell and Vic Damone in the film Rich, Young and Pretty.
- 1952 – "Because You're Mine" (music by Brodszky) introduced by Mario Lanza in the film Because You're Mine.
- 1955 – "I'll Never Stop Loving You" (music by Brodszky) introduced by Doris Day in the film Love Me or Leave Me.
- 1955 – "(Love Is) The Tender Trap" (music by Van Heusen) introduced by Frank Sinatra in the film The Tender Trap.
- 1956 – "Written on the Wind" (music by Victor Young) for the film Written on the Wind.
- 1958 – "To Love and Be Loved" (music by Van Heusen) for the film Some Came Running.
- 1959 – "The Best of Everything" (music by Alfred Newman) for the film The Best of Everything.
- 1960 – "The Second Time Around" (music by Van Heusen) for the film High Time.
- 1961 – "Pocketful of Miracles" (music by Van Heusen) for the film Pocketful of Miracles.
- 1964 – "Where Love Has Gone" (music by Van Heusen) for the film Where Love Has Gone. (Also Golden Globe nominee)
- 1964 – "My Kind of Town" (music by Van Heusen) for the film Robin and the 7 Hoods.
- 1967 – "Thoroughly Modern Millie" (music by Van Heusen) for the film Thoroughly Modern Millie. (Also Golden Globe nominee)
- 1968 – "Star" (music by Van Heusen) for the film Star!. (Also Golden Globe nominee)
- 1973 – "All That Love Went to Waste" (music by George Barrie) for the film A Touch of Class. (Also Golden Globe nominee)
- 1974 – "Now That We're In Love" (music by Barrie) for the film Whiffs. (Also Golden Globe nominee)

Other well-known songs

- "Ain't That a Kick in the Head?" (music by Van Heusen) for the film Ocean's 11
- "All My Tomorrows" (with Jimmy Van Heusen)
- "Bay mir bistu sheyn" (English version, with Saul Chaplin) (music by Sholom Secunda)
- "Christmas Is For Children" (with Gary Bruce)
- "The Christmas Waltz" (with Jule Styne)
- "Come Dance with Me" (with Van Heusen)
- "Come Fly with Me" (with Van Heusen)
- "Day by Day" (with Paul Weston and Axel Stordahl)
- "Five Minutes More" (with Styne)
- "Home in the Meadow", lyrics to the tune of Greensleeves for the movie How the West Was Won (1962)
- "I Guess I'll Hang My Tears Out to Dry" (with Styne)
- "I'll Never Stop Loving You" (with Nicholas Brodzsky)
- "I Should Care" (with Paul Weston and Axel Stordahl)
- "I Still Get Jealous" (with Styne)
- "It's Been a Long, Long Time" (with Styne)
- "I Want My Share of Love" (with Chaplin)
- "Let It Snow, Let It Snow, Let It Snow" (with Styne)
- "Let Me Try Again" (with Paul Anka and Caravelli)
- "Look to Your Heart" (with Van Heusen)
- "Love and Marriage" (with Van Heusen)
- "Mr. Booze" (with Van Heusen)
- "Only Trust Your Heart" (1957, with Nicholas Brodszky from movie Ten Thousand Bedrooms)
- "Only Trust Your Heart" (1964, a bossa nova with Benny Carter)
- "Papa, Won't You Dance with Me" (with Styne)
- "Please Be Kind" (with Saul Chaplin)
- "Rhythm Is Our Business" (with Chaplin)
- "Saturday Night (Is the Loneliest Night of the Week)" (with Styne)
- "Second Star to the Right" from Peter Pan (1953 film) (with Sammy Fain)
- "Swing for Sale" (with Chaplin)
- "Teach Me Tonight" (with Gene de Paul)
- "The Things We Did Last Summer" (with Styne)
- "The Secret of Christmas" (with Van Heusen)
- "Time After Time" (with Styne)
- "Until the Real Thing Comes Along" (with Saul Chaplin, Alberta Nichols, Mann Holiner, E.F. Freeman)
- "You're a Lucky Guy" (with Chaplin)
- "You Can Fly! You Can Fly! You Can Fly!" from Peter Pan (1953 film) (with Fain)
- "Your Mother and Mine" from Peter Pan (1953 film) (with Fain)

Lyrics for film musicals include Journey Back to Oz (1971) (music by Van Heusen) and The Wizard of Oz (1982) (music by Joe Hisaishi).

== Stage ==
Cahn wrote the lyrics for the following Broadway musicals:

- 1944 – Glad to See You music by Jule Styne
- 1947 – High Button Shoes music by Styne
- 1965 – Skyscraper music by Jimmy Van Heusen
- 1966 – Walking Happy music by Van Heusen
- 1970 – Look to the Lilies music by Jule Styne
