= Saul Chaplin =

American composer and musical director (1912–1997)

- Born: Saul Kaplan; February 19, 1912; Brooklyn, New York, U.S.
- Died: November 15, 1997 (aged 85); Los Angeles, California, U.S.
- Occupations: Composer, musical director
- Years active: 1931–1997
- Spouses: Ethel Schwartz; Betty Levin
- Children: Judith

Saul Chaplin (February 19, 1912 – November 15, 1997) was an American composer and musical director.

He was born Saul Kaplan in Brooklyn, New York. He had worked on stage, screen and television since the days of Tin Pan Alley. In film, he won three Oscars for collaborating on the scores and orchestrations of An American in Paris (1951), Seven Brides for Seven Brothers (1954) and West Side Story (1961).

== Biography ==
Born to a Jewish family, Chaplin graduated with a B.A. in accounting from New York University's School of Commerce. After school, Chaplin joined the ASCAP and started out penning tunes for the theatre, vaudeville and for New York's famous songwriting district, Tin Pan Alley. While in New York, Chaplin teamed with Sammy Cahn to compose original songs for Vitaphone movie shorts, filmed in Brooklyn by Warner Brothers. During this period the team was sometimes billed only by surname ("Cahn and Chaplin"), in the manner of Rodgers and Hart or Gilbert and Sullivan.

Cahn and Chaplin relocated to Hollywood and scored two films for Universal Pictures. Chaplin then moved to Columbia Pictures to score Cover Girl and The Jolson Story. While on the latter film, Chaplin and Al Jolson penned the million-selling hit tune The Anniversary Song. In the late 1940s, Chaplin moved to MGM to work on a long string of films including On the Town (1949), Kiss Me Kate (1953), High Society (1956) and Merry Andrew (1958). For collaborating on such hits as Bei mir bist du schön and Please Be Kind, Chaplin was inducted into the Songwriters Hall of Fame in 1985. He won Academy Awards for his work on the scores of Seven Brides for Seven Brothers, An American in Paris and West Side Story as well as nominations for Kiss Me Kate and High Society.

While continuing as a film music supervisor, Chaplin became an associate producer in the early '60s and worked on such major features as Can-Can (1960), West Side Story (1961), I Could Go On Singing (1963), The Sound of Music (1965), STAR! (1968), Man of La Mancha (1972) and That's Entertainment, Part 2 (1976).

He published his autobiography, The Golden Age of Movie Musicals and Me, in 1994. He had worked with and was friends with most of the major songwriters and performers of his era, such as Cole Porter, Ira Gershwin, Al Jolson, Leonard Bernstein, Judy Garland, Gene Kelly, Phil Silvers, Julie Andrews, Frank Sinatra and others. His memoir focused on the behind the scenes aspect of moviemaking.

== Marriages ==
Chaplin married Ethel Schwartz and had one child, a daughter Judith (who married Harold Prince); the couple divorced in 1950. In 1968, Chaplin married Betty Levin, who had worked as script supervisor on The Sound of Music.

== Death ==
In late 1997, the 85-year-old Chaplin suffered a bad fall and on November 15 died in Cedars-Sinai Medical Center as a result of his injuries.

== Selected filmography ==
as Composer:

- Argentine Nights (1940)
- Rookies on Parade (1941)
- Go West, Young Lady (1941)
- Time Out for Rhythm (1941)
- Sing for Your Supper (1941)
- Blondie Goes to College (1942)
- Blondie's Blessed Event (1942)
- Honolulu Lu (1942)
- Redhead from Manhattan (1943)
- Crazy House (1943)
- Cowboy Canteen (1944)
- Ever Since Venus (1944)
- Kansas City Kitty (1944)
- She's a Sweetheart (1944)
- Louisiana Hayride (1944)
- Meet Me on Broadway (1946)
- Two Blondes and a Redhead (1947)
- The Jolson Story (1947)
- The Countess of Monte Cristo (1948)
- Everything I Have Is Yours (1952)

as Arranger:

- On the Town (1949)
- Summer Stock (1950)
- An American in Paris (1951)
- Lovely to Look At (1952)
- Give a Girl a Break (1953)
- Kiss Me Kate (1953)
- Jupiter's Darling (1953)
- Seven Brides for Seven Brothers (1954)
- Interrupted Melody (1955)
- High Society (1956)

as Associate Producer:

- Les Girls (1957)
- Merry Andrew (1958)
- Can-Can (1960)
- West Side Story (1961)
- I Could Go On Singing (1963)
- The Sound of Music (1965)
- Star! (1968)
- Man of La Mancha (1972)
- That's Entertainment, Part II (1976)
