= List of songs recorded by Morgana King =

The following is a detailed songlist for Morgana King, which includes composers, album date and title from the years 1956 to the present. Her albums Airs de Cour (Mainstream Records 1022), Bidin' My Time, Morgana King - 2 LPs (Roulette Records), Morgana King Sings Just For You and The Best of Morgana King* (Mainstream Records) are not included due to the lack of an available track listing.

== Note: Box sets and compilations*; Also appears on** ==
A
Song	Composer(s)	Album(s) Year – Title	Label / catalog #
"A Foggy Day"	Gershwin, Gershwin	1959 – The Greatest Songs Ever Swung	Camden Records 542
"A Sleepin' Bee"	Arlen, Truman Capote	1990 – I Just Can't Stop Loving You; 1997 – Every Once In A While*	Muse Records 5408; 32 Jazz 32042
"A Song For You"	Russell	1973 – New Beginnings; 1990 – I Just Can't Stop Loving You; 1997 – Every Once In A While*	Paramount Records 6067; Muse Records 5408; 32 Jazz 32042
"A Taste of Honey"	Scott, Marlow	1964 – With A Taste of Honey; 1964 – A Taste Of Honey	Mainstream Records 6015; Mainstream Records 707
"A Time For Love"	Scott, Marlow	1967 – Gemini Changes; 2000 – The Complete Reprise Recordings*	Reprise Records 6257; Label M 5704
"Ain't Misbehavin'"/"Honeysuckle Rose"	Brooks, Razaf, Waller	1978 – Everything Must Change	Muse Records 5190
"All Blues"	Davis	1964 – A Taste Of Honey; 1965 – Miss Morgana King; 1990 – Highstream: The Best of Mainstream Jazz**	Mainstream Records 707; Ascot Records 16020; Mainstream Records
"All in All"	Williams	1973 – New Beginnings	Paramount Records 6067
"All In Love Is Fair"/"Feelings"	Wonder, Albert	1977 – Stretchin' Out	Muse Records 5166
"All or Nothing at All"	Altman, Lawrence	1965 – The End of a Love Affair; 1960 – Let Me Love You; 196x – Velvet Voice (South America release only)	Ascot Records 16014; United Artists Records 6020; UA 10111 and MH 14097
"And the Angels Sing"	Elman, Mercer, Tilton	1959 – The Greatest Songs Ever Swung	Camden Records 542
"Anything Goes"	Porter	1966 – Wild Is Love; 2000 – The Complete Reprise Recordings*	Reprise Records 6205; Label M 5704
"April Age"	Wilder	1965 – Winter of My Discontent	Wing Records 16307
"As Long as He Will Stay"	Gosh, Gimbel	1973 – New Beginnings	Paramount Records 6067
"As Time Goes By"	Hupfeld	1980 – Tribute to Billie Holiday**	
"At Sundown"	Donaldson	1959 – The Greatest Songs Ever Swung	Camden Records 542
B
Song	Composer(s)	Album(s) Year – Title	Label / catalog #
"Bee-Bom"	Vandyke	1966 – Wild Is Love; 2000 – The Complete Reprise Recordings*	Reprise Records 6205; Label M 5704
"Bill"	Hammerstein, Kern, Wodehouse	1958 – Morgana King Sings The Blues; 1965 – More Morgana King; 1994 – A Fine Romance: Jerome Kern Songbook**; 1997 – The Complete Jerome Kerns Songbooks**; 2000 – A Jazz Romance a Night in With Verve**	Mercury Records 20231; Mainstream Records 56052; PolyGram; UMG Recordings Inc. UMVD Labels
"Bluesette"	Thielemans, Jean-Baptiste, Gimbel	1964 – A Taste Of Honey; 1965 – Miss Morgana King	Mainstream Records 707; Ascot Records 16020
"Body and Soul"	Eyton, Green, Heyman, Sour	1958 – Morgana King Sings The Blues; 1986 – Simply Eloquent; 1992 – Jazz Divas: Studio**; 2000 – Tender Moments*; 2007 – Gold – Jazz Divas**	Mercury Records 20231; Muse Records 5326; PolyGram; Savoy Jazz 17253; Verve Records
C
Song	Composer(s)	Album(s) Year – Title	Label / catalog #
"Can't Help Lovin' Dat Man"	Hammerstein, Kern	1958 – Morgana King Sings The Blues; 1965 – More Morgana King	Mercury Records 20231; Mainstream Records 56052
"Chilly Winds"	John Stewart, Phillip	1960 – Folk Songs a La King; 1965 – Everybody Loves Saturday Night	United Artists Records 6028; Ascot Records 16019
"Clear Out Of This World"	Dubin, McHugh	1992 – Another Time, Another Space	Muse Records 5339
"Corcovado" ("Quiet Nights of Quiet Stars")	Jobim	1964 – With A Taste of Honey; 1972 – Cuore Di Mama	Mainstream Records 6015; Mainstream Records 355
"Could It Be Magic"	Anderson, Manilow	1977 – Stretchin' Out; 2000 – Tender Moments*; 2003 – Jazz for Romantic Moments**	Muse Records 5166; Savoy Jazz 17253; Savoy Jazz
"Cuore Di Mama (Mamma)"	Morricone	1965 – Miss Morgana King; 1972 – Cuore Di Mama	Ascot Records 16020; Mainstream Records 355
D
Song	Composer(s)	Album(s) Year – Title	Label / catalog #
"Dearly Beloved"	Kern, Mercer	1998 – Looking Through The Eyes of Love; 2000 – Tender Moments*	Muse Records 5257; Savoy Jazz 17253
"Deep Song"	Cory, Cross	1965 – It's A Quiet Thing; 2000 – The Complete Reprise Recordings*	Reprise Records 6192; Label M 5704
"Desert Hush"/"I Am A Leaf"	Cook, Greenaway	1973 – New Beginnings	Paramount Records 6067
"Didn't We?"	Webb	1968 – I Know How It Feels To Be Lonely	Verve Records 9229
"Dindi"	DeOliveira, Gilbert, Jobim	1965 – It's A Quiet Thing; 2000 – The Complete Reprise Recordings*	Reprise Records 6192; Label M 5704
"Don't Explain"	Herzog, Holiday	1966 – Wild Is Love; 2000 – The Complete Reprise Recordings*	Reprise Records 6205; Label M 5704
"Don't Stop"		1965 – Winter Of My Discontent	Wing Records 16307
"Don't Worry 'bout Me"	Bloom, Koehler	1986 – Stardust (Japan release only)	CBS/Sony 32DP 686
"Down In The Depths"	Porter	1956 – For You, For Me, For Evermore; 1965 – More Morgana King; 1986 – Simply Eloquent; 2008 – New York For Lovers**; 2008 – Jazz And The City**	EmArcy Records 36079s Mainstream Records 56052; Muse Records 5326; Verve Records; Deluxe Holland
"Drive"	Ocasek	1990 – I Just Can't Stop Loving You; 1997 – Every Once In A While*	Muse Records 5408; 32 Jazz 32042
E
Song	Composer(s)	Album(s) Year – Title	Label / catalog #
"Easy Living"	Rainger, Robin	1964 – A Taste Of Honey; 1965 – Miss Morgana King; 1980 – Tribute to Billie Holiday**; 1991 – Billie Holiday Revisited**	Mainstream Records 707; Ascot Records 16020; Mainstream Records
"Easy to Love"	Porter	1964 – A Taste Of Honey; 1964 – With A Taste of Honey; 1991 – Billie Holiday Revisited**	Mainstream Records 707; Mainstream Records 6015; Mainstream Records
"Eleanor Rigby"	Lennon–McCartney	1968 – I Know How It Feels To Be Lonely	Verve Records 9229
"Everything Must Change"	Ighner	1978 – Everything Must Change; 2000 – Tender Moments*	Muse Records 5190; Savoy Jazz 17253
"Ev'ry Time We Say Goodbye"	Porter	1986 – Simply Eloquent; 2000 – Tender Moments*	Muse Records 5326; Savoy Jazz 17253
"Ev'rybody Loves Saturday Night"	Campbell	1965 – Everybody Loves Saturday Night	Ascot Records 16019
"Ev'rything I Love"	Porter	1956 – For You, For Me, For Evermore; 1991 – Night and Day, Vol. 2: Songbook**; 1991 – I Get A Kick Out Of You: Cole Porter Songbook Vol. 2**; 1993 – The Complete Cole Porter Songbooks**; 2005 – Very Best Of The Cole Porter Songbook**	EmArcy Records 36079; PolyGram; PolyGram; Greatest Hits Spain
"Ev'rything I've Got"	Rodgers, Hart	1956 – For You, For Me, For Evermore	EmArcy Records 36079
F
Song	Composer(s)	Album(s) Year – Title	Label / catalog #
"Fascinating Rhythm"	Gershwin, Gershwin	1964 – With A Taste of Honey; 1964 – A Taste Of Honey	Mainstream Records 6015; Mainstream Records 707
"Feel Like Flying"	Vannelli	1979 – Higher Ground	Muse Records 5224
"Feelin' Groovy"	Simon	1968 – I Know How It Feels To Be Lonely	Verve Records 9229
"For You, For Me, For Evermore"	Gershwin, Gershwin	1956 – For You, For Me, For Evermore; 1965 – More Morgana King; 1994 – Gershwin Songbook: 'S Marvelous**; 1995 – The Complete Gershwin Songbooks**; 1996 – Easy Listening Jazz Classics**; 1998 – The Ultimate Collection: George Gershwin**; 2006 – Włoska Mafia**	EmArcy Records 36079; Mainstream Records 56052; PolyGram; PolyGram; Reader's Digest Music; Decca Records; Universal Music Polska
"Frankie and Johnny"	Cannon	1956 – The Young Ones Of Jazz**; 1958 – Morgana King Sings The Blues; 2002 – Mercury Songbook**	Mercury/EmArcy MG306084M; Mercury Records 20231; Universal Music Group International
G
Song	Composer(s)	Album(s) Year – Title	Label / catalog #
"Gentleman Friend"	Horwitt, Lewine	1998 – Looking Through The Eyes of Love	Muse Records 5257
"Give Me the Simple Life"	Bloom, Ruby	1978 – Everything Must Change	Muse Records 5190
"God Bless The Child"	Holiday, Herzog	1977 – Stretchin' Out	Muse Records 5166
"Golden Slumbers"	Lennon–McCartney	1979 – Higher Ground	Muse Records 5224
"Gone With The Wind"	Magidson, Wrubel	1965 – It's A Quiet Thing; 1986 – Stardust (Japan release only); 2000 – The Complete Reprise Recordings*	Reprise Records 6192; CBS/Sony 32DP 686; Label M 5704
"Goodnight Irene"	Lead Belly	1965 – Everybody Loves Saturday Night	Ascot Records 16019
"Got To Get You Into My Life"	Lennon, McCartney	1968 – I Know How It Feels To Be Lonely	Verve Records 9229
"Greensleeves"	Traditional	1960 – Folk Songs a La King; 1965 – Everybody Loves Saturday Night	United Artists Records 6028; Ascot Records 16019
H
Song	Composer(s)	Album(s) Year – Title	Label / catalog #
"Here I'll Stay"	Lerner, Weill	1956 – For You, For Me, For Evermore; 1965 – More Morgana King	EmArcy Records 36079; Mainstream Records 56052
"Here's That Rainy Day"	Burke, Van Heusen	1965 – It's A Quiet Thing; 2000 – The Complete Reprise Recordings*	Reprise Records 6192; Label M 5704
"Higher Ground"	Wonder	1979 – Higher Ground	Muse Records 5224
"How About You?"	Ralph Freed, Lane	1990 – I Just Can't Stop Loving You; 1997 – Every Once In A While*	Muse Records 5408; 32 Jazz 32042
"How High The Moon"	Nancy Hamilton, Lewis	1959 – The Greatest Songs Ever Swung	Camden Records 542
"How Insensitive" ("Insensatez")	deMoraes, Gimbel, Jobim	1965 – It's A Quiet Thing; 2000 – The Complete Reprise Recordings*	Reprise Records 6192; Label M 5704
"Human Nature"	Bettis, Porcaro	1990 – I Just Can't Stop Loving You; 1997 – Every Once In A While*	Muse Records 5408; 32 Jazz 32042
"Hush Little Baby"	Traditional	1960 – Folk Songs a La King; 1965 – Everybody Loves Saturday Night	United Artists Records 6028; Ascot Records 16019
I
Song	Composer(s)	Album(s) Year – Title	Label / catalog #
"I Can Do a Trick"	Hamilton	1968 – I Know How It Feels To Be Lonely	Verve Records 9229
"I Can't Believe That You're in Love with Me"	Gaskill, McHugh	1992 – This Is Always; 1997 – Every Once In A While*	Muse Records 5493; 32 Jazz 32042
"I Can't Get Started"	Duke, Gershwin	1959 – The Greatest Songs Ever Swung; 1986 – Stardust (Japan release only)	Camden Records 542; CBS/Sony 32DP 686
"I Get a Kick out of You"	Porter	1986 – Simply Eloquent	Muse Records 5326
"I Have Loved Me A Man"	Weaver	1967 – Gemini Changes; 2000 – The Complete Reprise Recordings*; 2006 – 40th Anniversary: Australia’s Tour of Duty: Vietnam**	Reprise Records 6257; Label M 5704; Sony BMG
"I Just Can't Stop Loving You"	Jackson	1990 – I Just Can't Stop Loving You; 2000 – Every Once In A While*	Muse Records 5408; 32 Jazz 32042
"I Know How It Feels To Be Lonely"	Gilbert, Guardino	1968 – I Know How It Feels To Be Lonely; 1995 – Great Ladies Sing the Blues**; 2002 – Great Ladies Sing the Blues**	Verve Records 9229; Umvd Special Markets; Delta Music
"I Know Where I'm Going"	Traditional	1960 – Folk Songs a La King; 1965 – Everybody Loves Saturday Night	United Artists Records 6028; Ascot Records 16019
"I Love Paris"	Porter	1964 – With A Taste of Honey; 1972 – Cuore Di Mama	Mainstream Records 6015; Mainstream Records 355
"I Love You Much"	Towber, Olshey, Raye	1965 – The End Of A Love Affair; 1960 – Let Me Love You; 196x – Velvet Voice (South America release only)	Ascot Records 10614; United Artists Records 6020; UA 10111 and MH 14097
"I Only Have Eyes For You"	Warren, Dubin	1986 – Stardust (Japan release only)	CBS/Sony 32DP 686
"I Remember You"	Schertzinger, Mercer	1986 – Stardust (Japan release only)	CBS/Sony 32DP 686
"I See Two Lovers"	Dixon, Wrubel	1958 – Morgana King Sings The Blues	Mercury Records 20231
"I Thought Of You Last Night"	Freed	1966 – Wild Is Love; 2000 – The Complete Reprise Recordings*	Reprise Records 6205; Label M 5704
"I Wished on the Moon"	Parker, Rainger	1998 – Looking Through The Eyes of Love	Muse Records 5257
"I'd Do It All Again"		1965 – Winter Of My Discontent	Wing Records 16307
"I'd Stay With You"	Williams	1967 – Gemini Changes; 2000 – The Complete Reprise Recordings*	Reprise Records 6257; Label M 5704
"I'm Glad There Is You"	Dorsey, Mediera	1977 – Stretchin' Out	Muse Records 5166
"If You Could See Me Now"	Dameron, Sigman	1956 – For You, For Me, For Evermore; 1983 – Portraits; 2002 – Jazz Legends (UK)**	EmArcy Records 36079; Muse Records 5301; Spectrum Music – MCA
"If You Should Leave Me (E Se Domani)"	Altman, Calabrese, Rossi	1965 – It's A Quiet Thing; 2000 – The Complete Reprise Recordings*	Reprise Records 6192; Label M 5704
"I'll Follow You"		1964 – A Taste Of Honey; 1965 – Miss Morgana King; 1972 – Cuore Di Mama	Mainstream Records 707; Ascot Records 16020; Mainstream Records 355
"I'll Never Smile Again"	Lowe	1965 – The End Of A Love Affair; 1960 – Let Me Love You; 196x – Velvet Voice (South America release only)	Ascot Records 16014; United Artists Records 6020; UA 10111 and MH 14097
"I'll Remember April"	de Paul, Johnston, Raye	1960 – Let Me Love You; 196x – Velvet Voice (South America release only); 1965 – The End Of A Love Affair	United Artists Records 6020; UA 10111 and MH 14097; Ascot Records 16014
"I'll String Along With You"	Dubin, Warren	1956 – For You, For Me, For Evermore	EmArcy Records 36079
"I'm On My Way"		1965 – Everybody Loves Saturday Night	Ascot Records 16019
"Imagination"/"I'm Old Fashioned"	Van Heusen, Burke/Kern, Mercer	1998 – Looking Through The Eyes of Love; 2000 – Tender Moments*	Muse Records 5257; Savoy Jazz 17253
"In the Wee Small Hours of the Morning"	Hilliard, Mann	1956 – For You, For Me, For Evermore	EmArcy Records 36079
"It Never Entered My Mind"	Hart, Rodgers	1986 – Simply Eloquent	Muse Records 5326
"It Only Happens When I Dance with You"	Berlin	1990 – I Just Can't Stop Loving You; 1997 – Every Once In A While*	Muse Records 5408; 32 Jazz 32042
"It's A Fine Day for Walkin' Country Style"		1965 – Winter Of My Discontent	Wing Records 16307
"It's A Quiet Thing"	Kander, Ebb	1965 – It's A Quiet Thing; 2000 – The Complete Reprise Recordings*	Reprise Records 6192; Label M 5704
"It's De-Lovely"	Porter	1956 – For You, For Me, For Evermore; 2002 – Mercury Songbook**	EmArcy Records 36079; Universal Music Group International
"It's Only A Paper Moon"	Arlen, Harburg, Rose	1958 – Morgana King Sings The Blues; 1997 – That Old Black Magic: The Harold Arlen Songbook**; 2002 – Mercury Songbook**; 2005 – Get Happy: The Harold Arlen Centennial Celebration**	Mercury Records 20231; PolyGram; Universal Music Group International; Verve Records
"It's So Peaceful in the Valley"		1965 – Winter Of My Discontent	Wing Records 16307
"It's You or No One"	Cahn, Styne	1992 – This Is Always; 1997 – Every Once In A While*	Muse Records 5493; 32 Jazz 32042
"I've Found a New Baby" (Fast version)	Palmer, Williams	1960 – Let Me Love You; 196x – Velvet Voice (South America release only); 1965 – The End Of A Love Affair	United Artists Records 6020; UA 10111 and MH 14097; Ascot Records 16014
"I've Found a New Baby" (Slow version)	Palmer, Williams	1960 – Let Me Love You; 1965 – The End Of A Love Affair	United Artists Records 6020; Ascot Records 16014
J
Song	Composer(s)	Album(s) Year – Title	Label / catalog #
"Jennifer Had"	Farber	1973 – New Beginnings	Paramount Records 6067
"Just Friends"	Klenner, Lewis	1992 – This Is Always; 1997 – Every Once In A While*	Muse Records 5493; 32 Jazz 32042
"Just the Way You Are"	Joel	1978 – Everything Must Change; 2000 – Tender Moments*	Muse Records 5190; Savoy Jazz 17253
"Just You, Just Me"	Greer, Klages	1959 – The Greatest Songs Ever Swung	Camden Records 542
K
Song	Composer(s)	Album(s) Year – Title	Label / catalog #
"Kisses Sweeter Than Wine"	Newman, Campbell	1965 – Everybody Loves Saturday Night	Ascot Records 16019
L
Song	Composer(s)	Album Year – Title	Label / catalog #
"Lazy Afternoon"	La Touche, Moross	1964 – With A Taste of Honey; 1972 – Cuore Di Mama	Mainstream Records 6015; Mainstream Records 355
"Let Me Love You"	Howard	1965 – The End Of A Love Affair; 1960 – Let Me Love You; 196x – Velvet Voice (South America release only)	Ascot Records 10614; United Artists Records 6020; UA 10111 and MH 14097
"Let's Call the Whole Thing Off"	Gershwin, Gershwin	1986 – Simply Eloquent	Muse Records 5326
"Let's Get Away from It All"	Adair, Dennis	1992 - This Is Always; 1997 – Every Once In A While*	Muse Records 5493; 32 Jazz 32042
"Like A Seed"	Rankin, Rankin	1973 – New Beginnings; 2002 – Café Après-midi: Lilas**	Paramount Records 6067 -
"Like Someone in Love"	Burke, Van Heusen	1986 – Stardust (Japan release only); 1992 – Another Time, Another Space; 2000 – Tender Moments*	CBS/Sony 32DP 686; Muse Records 5339; Savoy Jazz 17253
"Lilac Wine"	Shelton	1998 – Looking Through The Eyes of Love; 2000 – Tender Moments*	Muse Records 5257; Savoy Jazz 17253
"Little Girl Blue"	Hart, Rodgers	1965 – It's A Quiet Thing; 2000 – The Complete Reprise Recordings*	Reprise Records 6192; Label M 5704
"Loch Lomand"	Traditional	1960 – Folk Songs a La King; 1965 – Everybody Loves Saturday Night	United Artists Records 6028; Ascot Records 16019
"Lonesome Road"	Shilkret, Austin	1959 – The Greatest Songs Ever Swung	Camden Records 542
"Love is Sweeping the Country"	Gershwin, Gershwin	1998 – Looking Through The Eyes of Love	Muse Records 5257
"Love Song"	Duncan	1978 – Everything Must Change	Muse Records 5190
"Lullaby of Birdland"	Shearing, Weiss	1959 - The Greatest Songs Ever Swung	Camden Records 542
"Lush Life"	Strayhorn	1983 – Portraits; 2000 – Tender Moments*	Muse Records 5301; Savoy Jazz 17253
M
Song	Composer(s)	Album(s) Year – Title	Label / catalog #
"Mad About Him, Sad Without Him, How; Can I Live Without Him, Blues"	Charles, Markes Jr.	1965 – The End Of A Love Affair; 1960 – Let Me Love You; 196x – Velvet Voice (South America release only)	Ascot Records 16014; United Artists Records 6020; UA 10111 and MH 14097
"Mad About the Boy"	Coward	1958 – Morgana King Sings The Blues; 1965 – More Morgana King	Mercury Records 20231; Mainstream Records 56052
"Makin' Whoopee"	Donaldson, Kahn	1977 – Stretchin' Out	Muse Records 5166
"Mean to Me"	Ahlert, Turk	1958 – Morgana King Sings The Blues; 1965 – More Morgana King	Mercury Records 20231; Mainstream Records 56052
"Meditation" ("Meditacao")	Jobim, Mendonca, Gimbel	1964 – A Taste Of Honey; 1965 – Miss Morgana King; 1972 – Cuore Di Mama	Mainstream Records 707; Ascot Records 16020; Mainstream Records 355
"More Than You Know"	Eliscu, Rose, Youmans	1958 – Morgana King Sings The Blues; 2002 – Jazz Singing**	Mercury Records 20231; UMVD Import
"Mountain Greenery"	Hart, Rodgers	1992 – Another Time, Another Space	Muse Records 5339
"Mountain High, Valley Low"	Hanighen, Scott	1965 – It's A Quiet Thing; 2000 – The Complete Reprise Recordings*	Reprise Records 6192 – Label M 5704
"My Funny Valentine"	Rodgers, Hart	2003 – Women of Substance**; 2004 – Classic Love Songs**; 2004 – Jazz Express Presents: The Jazz Singers**; 2004 – Original Divas**; 2007 – The Ultimate Most Relaxing Jazz in the Universe**	Savoy Jazz; BMG Special Products; Metro Music; Sony BMG Special Products; Danon Records
"My Funny Valentine"/"You Are So Beautiful"	Rodgers, Hart/Fisher, Preston	1978 – Everything Must Change; 2000 – Jazz for When You're in Love**; 2000 – Tender Moments*; 2003 – Jazz for Romantic Moments**	Muse Records 5190; 32 Jazz; Savoy Jazz 17253; Savoy Jazz
"My Love is a Wanderer"		1965 – Everybody Loves Saturday Night	Ascot Records 16019
N
Song	Composer(s)	Album(s) Year – Title	Label / catalog #
"Nobody Else But Me"	Hammerstein II, Kern	1966 – Wild Is Love; 2000 – The Complete Reprise Recordings*	Reprise Records 6205; Label M 5704
O
Song	Composer(s)	Album(s) Year – Title	Label / catalog #
"Oh Dear! What Can The Matter Be?"	Traditional	1960 – Folk Songs a La King; 1965 – Everybody Loves Saturday Night	United Artists Records 6028; Ascot Records 16019
"Oh, I Wish I Were In Love Again"	Rodgers, Hart	1965 – Everybody Loves Saturday Night	Ascot Records 16019
"On a Slow Boat to China"	Loesser	1992 – This Is Always; 1997 – Every Once In A While*	Muse Records 5493; 32 Jazz 32042
"On Green Dolphin Street"	Kaper, Washington	1986 – Stardust (Japan release only); 1992 – Another Time, Another Space	CBS/Sony 32DP 686; Muse Records 5339
"On The South Side of Chicago"	Zeller	1967 – Gemini Changes; 2000 – The Complete Reprise Recordings*	Reprise Records 6257; Label M 5704
"Once I Loved (O Amor en Paz)"	Jobim	1967 – Gemini Changes; 2000 – The Complete Reprise Recordings*	Reprise Records 6257; Label M 5704
"Only Know I Loved You"	Scibetta, Wallow	1968 – I Know How It Feels To Be Lonely	Verve Records 9229
"Out Of Nowhere"	Green, Heyman	1978 – Everything Must Change	Muse Records 5190
P
Song	Composer(s)	Album(s) Year – Title	Label / catalog #
"Perdido"	Tizol	1959 – The Greatest Songs Ever Swung	Camden Records 542
"Prelude to a Kiss"	Ellington, Mills, Gordon	1964 – With A Taste of Honey; 1964 – A Taste Of Honey	Mainstream Records 6015; Mainstream Records 707
Q
Song	Composer(s)	Album(s) Year – Title	Label / catalog #
R
Song	Composer(s)	Album(s) Year – Title	Label / catalog #
"Rain Rain (Don't Go Away)"		1965 – Winter Of My Discontent	Wing Records 16307
S
Song	Composer(s)	Album(s) Year – Title	Label / catalog #
"'S Wonderful"	Gershwin, Gershwin	1992 – Another Time, Another Space	Muse Records 5339
"Send in the Clowns"	Sondheim	1983 – Portraits	Muse Records 5301
"Simply Eloquent"	Morgana King, Monte Oliver	1986 – Simply Eloquent	Muse Records 5326
"Since I Fell for You"	Johnson	1968 – I Know How It Feels To Be Lonely	Verve Records 9229
"Softly Say Goodbye"	Wallawich, Scibetto	1967 – Gemini Changes; 2000 – The Complete Reprise Recordings*	Reprise Records 6257; Label M 5704
"Solitude"	DeLange, Ellington, Mills	1992 – Another Time, Another Space	Muse Records 5339
"Someone to Watch Over Me"	Gershwin, Gershwin	1986 – Stardust (Japan release only)	CBS/Sony 32DP 686
"Something To Remember You By"	Dietz, Schwartz	1958 – Morgana King Sings The Blues	Mercury Records 20231
"Sometimes I Feel Like a Motherless Child"	Traditional	1964 – A Taste Of Honey; 1965 – Miss Morgana King; 1972 – Cuore Di Mama; 1991 – Great Ladies of Jazz Vol. 2**	Mainstream Records 707; Ascot Records 16020; Mainstream Records 355; K-Tel
"Stardust"	Carmichael	1986 – Stardust (Japan release only)	CBS/Sony 32DP 686
"Summer Me, Winter Me"	Bergman, Bergman, Legrand	1990 – I Just Can't Stop Loving You; 1997 – Every Once In A While*	Muse Records 5408; 32 Jazz 32042
"Sunny"	Hebb	1967 – Gemini Changes; 2000 – The Complete Reprise Recordings*	Reprise Records 6257; Label M 5704
"Sunshine Superman"	Leitch	1968 – I Know How It Feels To Be Lonely	Verve Records 9229
T
Song	Composer(s)	Album(s) Year – Title	Label / catalog #
"Take the 'A' Train"	Strayhorn	1959 – The Greatest Songs Ever Swung; 2002 – We Love New York**	Camden Records 542; RCA Records
"That Ole Devil Called Love"	Fisher, Roberts	1960 – Let Me Love You; 196x – Velvet Voice (South America release only); 1965 – The End Of A Love Affair	United Artists Records 6020; UA 10111 and MH 14097; Ascot Records 16014
"The Best Is Yet to Come"	Coleman, Leigh	1966 – Wild Is Love; 2000 – The Complete Reprise Recordings*	Reprise Records 6205; Label M 5704
"The Best Things In Life Are Free"	Brown, DeSylva, Henderson	1992 – This Is Always; 1997 – Every Once In A While*	Muse Records 5493; 32 Jazz 32042
"The End Of A Love Affair"	Redding	1965 – The End Of A Love Affair; 1960 – Let Me Love You; 196x – Velvet Voice (South America release only)	Ascot Records 16014; United Artists Records 6020; UA 10111 and MH 14097
"The Gentleman Is A Dope"	Rodgers, Hammerstein	1992 – Another Time, Another Space	Muse Records 5339
"The Lady Is a Tramp"	Hart, Rodgers	1964 – With A Taste of Honey; 1964 – A Taste Of Honey; 1993 – Mainstream Records Jazz & Blues Sampler**	Mainstream Records 6015; Mainstream Records 707; Mainstream Records
"The Lady Sings the Blues"	Holiday, Nicols	1965 – Winter Of My Discontent	Wing Records 16307
"The Long and Winding Road"	Lennon, McCartney	1979 – Higher Ground	Muse Records 5224
"The Look Of Love"	Bacharach, David	1967 – Gemini Changes; 2000 – The Complete Reprise Recordings*	Reprise Records 6257; Label M 5704
"The Love of My Life (The Lady in My Life)"	Temperton	1990 – I Just Can't Stop Loving You; 1997 – Every Once In A While*	Muse Records 5408; 32 Jazz 32042
"The Moment Of Truth"	Satterwhite, Scott	1966 – Wild Is Love; 1983 – Portraits; 2000 – The Complete Reprise Recordings*	Reprise Records 6205; Muse Records 5301; Label M 5704
"The More I See You"	Warren, Gordon	1986 – Stardust (Japan release only)	CBS/Sony 32DP 686
"The Night Has A Thousand Eyes"	Brainer, Bernier	1964 – A Taste Of Honey; 1965 – Miss Morgana King	Mainstream Records 707; Ascot Records 16020
"The One I Love Belongs To Somebody Else"	Kahn, Jones	1979 – Higher Ground	Muse Records 5224
"The Sands of Time And Changes"	Hathaway, McKinnor	1973 – New Beginnings	Paramount Records 6067
"The Shadow Of Your Smile" (Love Theme from the film The Sandpiper)	Mandel, Webster	1966 – Wild Is Love; 2000 – The Complete Reprise Recordings*	Reprise Records 6205; Label M 5704
"The Song Is You"	Hammerstein, Kern	1956 – For You, For Me, For Evermore; 1965 – More Morgana King	EmArcy Records 36079; Mainstream Records 56052
"The Things We Did Last Summer"	Cahn, Styne	1992 – This Is Always; 1997 – Every Once In A While*	Muse Records 5493; 32 Jazz 32042
"Them There Eyes"	Pinkard, Tauber, Tracey	1977 – Stretchin' Out	Muse Records 5166
"There Will Never Be Another You"	Gordon, Warren	1992 – Another Time, Another Space	Muse Records 5339
"There's A Lull In My Life"	Gordon, Revel	1956 – For You, For Me, For Evermore; 1965 – More Morgana King	EmArcy Records 36079; Mainstream Records 56052
"They All Laughed"	Gershwin, Gershwin	1990 – I Just Can't Stop Loving You; 1997 – Every Once In A While*	Muse Records 5408; 32 Jazz 32042
"They Can't Take That Away from Me"	Gershwin, Gershwin	1992 – This Is Always; 1997 – Every Once In A While*	Muse Records 5493; 32 Jazz 32042
"This Can't Be Love"	Hart, Rodgers	1992 – This Is Always; 1997 – Every Once In A While*	Muse Records 5493; 32 Jazz 32042
"This Is Always"	Gordon, Warren	1992 – This Is Always; 1997 – Every Once In A While*	Muse Records 5493; 32 Jazz 32042
"This Is My Song"	Chaplin	1967 – Gemini Changes; 2000 – The Complete Reprise Recordings*	Reprise Records 6257; Label M 5704
"This Masquerade"	Russell	1978 – Everything Must Change	Muse Records 5190
"Through the Eyes of Love"	Hamlisch, Sager	1998 – Looking Through The Eyes of Love; 2000 – Tender Moments*	Muse Records 5257; Savoy Jazz 17253
"Time After Time"	Cahn, Styne	1998 – Looking Through The Eyes of Love; 2000 – Tender Moments*	Muse Records 5257; Savoy Jazz 17253
"Time For Sleeping"		1960 – Folk Songs a La King; 1965 – Everybody Loves Saturday Night	United Artists Records 6028; Ascot Records 16019
"Time Was" (Duermé)	Sosenko	1983 – Portraits; 2000 – Tender Moments*	Muse Records 5301; Savoy Jazz 17253
"Tomorrow Never Knows"	Lennon, McCartney	1968 – I Know How It Feels To Be Lonely	Verve Records 9229
"Try To Remember"	Jones, Schmidt	1964 – A Taste Of Honey; 1965 – Miss Morgana King; 1972 – Cuore Di Mama	Mainstream Records 707; Ascot Records 16020; Mainstream Records 355
"'Twas The Night Before Xmas"		1965 – Everybody Loves Saturday Night	Ascot Records 16019
U
Song	Composer(s)	Album(s) Year – Title	Label / catalog #
"Undecided"	Shavers, Robin	1960 – Let Me Love You; 196x – Velvet Voice (South America release only); 1965 – The End Of A Love Affair	United Artists Records 6020; UA10111 and MH 14097; Ascot Records 16014
"Useless Landscape" ("Inútil Paisagem") ("If You Never Come to Me")	DeOliveira, Gilbert, Jobim	1965 – It's A Quiet Thing; 2000 – The Complete Reprise Recordings*	Reprise Records 6192; Label M 5704
V
Song	Composer(s)	Album(s) Year – Title	Label / catalog #
"Visions"	Wonder	1977 – Stretchin' Out	Muse Records 5166
W
Song	Composer(s)	Album(s) Year – Title	Label / catalog #
"Walk On By"	Bacharach, David, Warwick	1967 – Gemini Changes; 2000 – The Complete Reprise Recordings*; 2006 – What the World Needs Now Is Burt & Hal**	Reprise Records 6257; Label M 5704; Rhino/Wea UK
"Warm Eyes And Bright"	William, Smollen	1968 – I Know How It Feels To Be Lonely	Verve Records 9229
"Watch What Happens"	Gimbel, Legrand	1967 – Gemini Changes; 2000 – The Complete Reprise Recordings*	Reprise Records 6257; Label M 5704
"We Could Be Flying"	Colombier, Williams	1973 – New Beginnings	Paramount Records 6067
"What a Diff'rence a Day Made"	Grever, Adams	1977 – Stretchin' Out	Muse Records 5166
"What Is This Thing Called Love?"	Porter	1979 – Higher Ground	Muse Records 5224
"What's Going On / Save The Children"	Benson, Cleveland, Gaye	1983 – Portraits	Muse Records 5301
"What's Wrong With Me?"	Wallawich, Scibetto	1967 – Gemini Changes; 2000 – The Complete Reprise Recordings*	Reprise Records 6257; Label M 5704
"When I Fall in Love"/"Teach Me Tonight"	Young, Heyman/DePaul, Kahn	1979 – Higher Ground	Muse Records 5224
"When The World Was Young"		1972 – Cuore Di Mama	Mainstream Records 355
"When Your Lover Has Gone"	Swan	1958 – Morgana King Sings The Blues	Mercury Records 20231
"Where Am I Going"	Fields, Coleman	1968 – I Know How It Feels To Be Lonely; 1996 – America Songbook Series: Cy Coleman**	Verve Records 9229; Smithsonian Collection
"While We're Young"	Aaron, Adelson, Adler	1965 – Winter Of My Discontent	Wing Records 16307
"Who Can I Turn To?"	Bricusse, Newley	1965 – Miss Morgana King; 1965 – Winter Of My Discontent; 1972 – Cuore Di Mama	Ascot Records 16020 Wing Records 16307; Mainstream Records 355
"Why Was I Born?"	Hammerstein, Kern	1958 – Morgana King Sings The Blues; 1965 – More Morgana King	Mercury Records 20231; Mainstream Records 56052
"Wild Is Love"	Rasch, Wayne	1966 – Wild Is Love; 2000 – The Complete Reprise Recordings*	Reprise Records 6205; Label M 5704
"Will You Still Be Mine?"	Adair, Dennis	1986 – Simply Eloquent	Muse Records 5326
"Winter of My Discontent"	Wilder, Berenberg	1965 – Winter Of My Discontent	Wing Records 16307
"Wish Me Well"	Engvick, Wilder	1965 – Winter Of My Discontent	Wing Records 16307
"With You I'm Born Again"	Connors, Shire	1998 – Looking Through The Eyes of Love	Muse Records 5257
X
Song	Composer(s)	Album(s) Year – Title	Label / catalog #
Y
Song	Composer(s)	Album(s) Year – Title	Label / catalog #
"You Always Hurt the One You Love"	Roberts, Fisher	1965 – The End Of A Love Affair; 1960 – Let Me Love You; 196x – Velvet Voice (South America release only)	Ascot Records 16014; United Artists Records 6020; UA 10111 and MH 14097
"You Are a Story"	Bertoncini, Mauro	1966 – Wild Is Love; 2000 – The Complete Reprise Recordings*	Reprise Records 6205; Label M 5704
"You Are the Sunshine of My Life"	Wonder	1973 – New Beginnings	Paramount Records 6067
"You Don't Know What Love Is"	DePaul, Raye	1965 – The End Of A Love Affair; 1960 – Let Me Love You; 196x – Velvet Voice (South America release only)	Ascot Records 10614; United Artists Records 6020; UA 10111 and MH 14097
"You Fascinate Me So"	Coleman, Leigh	1966 – Wild Is Love; 2000 – The Complete Reprise Recordings*	Reprise Records 6205; Label M 5704
"You Go to My Head"	Coots, Gillespie	1983 – Portraits; 2000 – Tender Moments*; 2003 – Jazz for an Elegant Rendezvous**	Muse Records 5301; Savoy Jazz 17253; Savoy Jazz
"You Stepped Out of a Dream"	Brown, Kahn	1979 – Higher Ground	Muse Records 5224
"Young and Foolish"		1972 – Cuore Di Mama	Mainstream Records 355
"Your House"		1965 – Winter Of My Discontent	Wing Records 16307
"You're Driving Me Crazy"	Donaldson	1979 – Higher Ground	Muse Records 5224
"You're Not So Easy To Forget"		1956 – For You, For Me, For Evermore	EmArcy Records 36079
"You're Not the Kind"	Hudson, Mills	1983 – Portraits	Muse Records 5301
Z
Song	Composer(s)	Album(s) Year – Title	Label / catalog #
