= Morgana King discography =

The following is a list of albums recorded by Morgana King from the years 1956 to the present.

== Albums ==
"… It is a parading of the different emotions that each composition contains." Joe Fields

Albums
Year	Title	Label / catalog #	Notes
1998	Looking Through the Eyes of Love	Muse Records 5257	
1992	This Is Always	Muse Records 5493	
1992	Another Time, Another Space	Muse Records 5339	Out of print
1991	I Just Can't Stop Loving You	Muse Records 5408	Out of print
1986	Simply Eloquent	Muse Records 5326	Out of print
1986	Stardust	CBS/Sony 32DP 686	Japan release only Out of print
1983	Portraits	Muse Records 5301	Never released as a commercial CD; Out of print
1979	Higher Ground	Muse Records 5224	Out of print
1978	Everything Must Change	Muse Records 5290	Out of print
1977	Stretchin' Out	Muse Records 5166	Out of print
1973	New Beginnings	Paramount Records 6067, Universal RecordsUICY 6935 (2007)	Out of print
1972	Cuore di Mama	Mainstream Records 355	Out of print
1968	I Know How It Feels to Be Lonely	Verve Records 9229	Out of print
1967	Gemini Changes	Reprise Records 6257	Out of print
1966	Wild Is Love	Reprise Records 6205, Collectors' Choice Music 704 (2006)	Out of print
1965	More Morgana King	Mainstream Records 56052	Out of print
1965	Miss Morgana King	Ascot Records 16020	Out of print
1965	Everybody Loves Saturday Night; Todos Aman el Sabado a la Noche (Argentina)	Ascot Records 16019, ALM 13020, UA 10099	Out of print
1965	The End of a Love Affair	Ascot Records AS-16014, ALM-13019	Out of print
1965	Winter of My Discontent	Wing Records 16307	Out of print
1965	Morgana King	Reprise Records 60081	Out of print
1965	It's a Quiet Thing	Reprise Records 6192, Collectors' Choice Music 703 (2006)	Out of print
1964	With a Taste of Honey	Mainstream Records 6015	Out of print
1964	A Taste of Honey	Mainstream Records 707, Sony 57121 (1993)	Out of print
196-	Airs de Cour	Mainstream Records 1022	Out of print
1960	Folk Songs à la King	United Artists Records UAS-6028 and UAL-3028	Out of print
196-	Velvet Voice	United Artists Records 10111, MH 14097	South America release only Out of print
1960	Let Me Love You	United Artists Records UAS-6020 and UAL-3020	Out of print
1959	The Greatest Songs Ever Swung	Camden Records 543, BMG BVCJ-2035 (1991)	Out of print
1958	Morgana King Sings the Blues	Mercury Records 20231, PolyGram International 9043 (2001)	Out of print
1956	For You, For Me, For Evermore	EmArcy Records 36079, PolyGram 514077 (1992)	Out of print
19--	Sings Just For You	N/A	Out of print
19--	Bidin' My Time	N/A	Out of print

=== Box sets and compilations ===
Box Sets and Compilations
Year	Title	Label / catalog #	Notes
2000	The Complete Reprise Recordings	Label M 5704	Includes It's a Quiet Thing, Wild Is Love and Gemini Changes
2000	Tender Moments	32 Jazz 32200, Savoy Jazz 17253 (2003)	
1997	Every Once In a While	32 Jazz 32042	Out of print Includes I Just Can't Stop Loving You and This Is Always
198-	The Best of Morgana King	Mainstream Records	Out of print
198-	Morgana King (2 LPs)	Roulette Records	Out of print

== Also appears on ==
Song also appears on
Song	Year	Album	Record label
"All Blues"	1990	Highstream: The Best of Mainstream Jazz	Mainstream Records
"As Time Goes By"	1980	Tribute to Billie Holiday	Mainstream Records
"Bill"	1997; 1994	The Complete Jerome Kerns Songbooks; A Fine Romance: Jerome Kern Songbook	Verve Records; PolyGram
"Body and Soul"	2007; 1992	Gold: Jazz Divas (Disc 1); Jazz Divas Studio	Verve Records; PolyGram
"Could It Be Magic"	2003	Jazz for Romantic Moments	Savoy Jazz
"Down in the Depths"	2008; 2005	Jazz and the City; New York for Lovers	Deluxe Holland; Verve Records
"Easy Living"	1991; 1980; 1974	Billie Holiday Revisited; Tribute to Billie Holiday; Billie Holiday Revisited	Mainstream Records; Mainstream Records; Mainstream Records
"Easy to Love"	1991; 1974	Billie Holiday Revisited; Billie Holiday Revisited	Mainstream Records; Mainstream Records
"Ev'rything I Love"	2005; 1993; 1991; 1991	Very Best of the Cole Porter Songbook (Disc 1); The Complete Cole Porter Songbooks (Disc 2); Night and Day, Volume 2: Songbook; I Get a Kick Out of You: Cole Porter Songbook Volume 2	Greatest Hits Spain; PolyGram; PolyGram; Verve Records
"For You, for Me, for Evermore"	2006; 2001; 1998; 1996; 1995; 1994	Włoska Mafia; The Ultimate Collection: George Gershwin; The Ultimate Collection: George Gershwin; Easy Listening Jazz Classics; The Complete Gershwin Songbooks (Disc 2); Gershwin Songbook: 'S Marvelous	Universal Music Group Polska; Decca Records; Decca Records; Reader's Digest Music; PolyGram; PolyGram
"Frankie and Johnny"	2002; 1956	Mercury Songbook (Disc 2); The Young Ones of Jazz	Universal Music Group International; Mercury Records
"I Have Loved Me a Man"	2006	40th Anniversary: Australia's Tour of Duty: Vietnam (Disc 1)	Sony BMG
"I Know How It Feels to Be Lonely"	2002; 1995	Great Ladies Sing the Blues; Great Ladies Sing the Blues	UMVD Special Markets (CD only); UMVD Special Markets
"If You Could See Me Now"	2002	Our Favourite Things	Universal/Spectrum
"It's De-Lovely"	2002	Mercury Songbook (Disc 1)	Universal Music Group International
"It's Only a Paper Moon"	2005; 2002; 1997	Get Happy: The Harold Arlen Centennial Celebration; Mercury Songbook (Disc 1); That Old Black Magic: The Harold Arlen Songbook	Verve Records; Universal Music Group International; Verve Records
"Like A Seed"	2002	Café Après-midi: Lilas	Universal Music Group
"More Than You Know"	2002	Jazz Singing (Disc 3)	Universal Music Group International
"My Funny Valentine"	2007; 2004; 2004; 2004; 2003	The Ultimate Most Relaxing Jazz Music in the Universe (Disc 1); Classic Love Songs; Jazz Express Presents: The Jazz Singers; Original Divas (Disc 1); Women of Substance	Denon Records; Sony BMG Special Products; Metro Music; Sony BMG Special Products; Savoy Jazz
"My Funny Valentine"/"You Are So Beautiful"	2003; 2000	Jazz for Romantic Moments; Jazz for When You're in Love	Savoy Jazz; 32 Jazz
"Sometimes I Feel Like a Motherless Child"	1991	Great Ladies of Jazz, Volume 2	K-Tel series
"Take the "A" Train"	2002	We Love New York	RCA Records
"The Lady Is a Tramp"	1993	Mainstream Records Jazz & Blues Sampler	Mainstream Records
"Walk On By"	2006	What the World Needs Now Is Burt & Hal	Rhino/Wea UK
"Where Am I Going"	1996	American Songbook Series: Cy Coleman	Smithsonian Collection
"You Go to My Head"	2003	Jazz for an Elegant Rendezvous	Savoy Jazz
