= Gene DiNovi =

American jazz pianist (born 1928)

Eugene Salvatore "Gene" DiNovi (born May 26, 1928) is an American jazz pianist.

== Biography ==
DiNovi was born in New York City. He worked with Joe Marsala and Chuck Wayne while a teenager. He was very active live and on record in the late 1940s, working with Buddy DeFranco, Benny Goodman, Chubby Jackson, Brew Moore, Boyd Raeburn, Buddy Rich, Artie Shaw, Lester Young. He worked extensively as an accompanist for vocalists, starting with Peggy Lee in 1949–1950; he also played behind Tony Bennett and Anita O'Day. He recorded with Lena Horne multiple times in the late 1950s and early 1960s and also accompanied her on tours of Europe. During this time, he also worked with his own small groups; his sidemen included Danny Bank, Johnny Carisi, Bill Crow, Tony Fruscella, and Dave Schildkraut. He began working more as a studio musician and film score composer in the 1960s. Toward the end of the decade he played with Carmen McRae, then moved to Canada to take a position as a house pianist with the CBC in Toronto. In the 1980s he worked with Ruby Braff and toured and recorded in Japan, and continued to be active as a performer into the 1990s, working with James Campbell, Don Thompson, Memo Acevedo, Dave Young, and Terry Clarke.

DiNovi's daughter is the film producer Denise Di Novi.

== Discography ==
- 1990 Precious Moment (Pony Canyon)
- 1992 Remembrance (Marshmallow)
- 1992 How Beautiful Is Night (Marshmallow)
- 1994 Renaissance of a Jazz Master (Candid)
- 1996 Live at the Montreal Bistro (Candid)
- 1997 At the Stables (Hep)
- 1999 Plays the Music of Benny Carter (Hep)
- 2001 So in Love (Pony Canyon)
- 2003 Golden Earrings (Pony Canyon)
- 2003 Plays Duke Ellington and Billy Strayhorn Live (Baldwin Street Music)
- 2007 Flower of the Night (Marshmallow)
- 2008 The Three Optimists at the Old Mill (Sackville)

=== As sideman ===
- 1955 Cloud 7, Tony Bennett (Columbia)
- 1957 Stormy Weather Lena Horne (RCA Victor)
- 1958 Sea Shells, Peggy Lee (Decca)
- 1972 Bebop Spoke Here, Benny Goodman and Charlie Barnet (Capitol)
- 1975 The Aladdin Sessions, Lester Young (Blue Note)
- 1984 Over the Rainbow, Aura Urziceanu (Electrecord)
- 1997 Songbook, Benny Carter (MusicMasters)
- 1999 The Canadian Sessions, Ruby Braff (Sackville)
