= George Wallington =

Italian-American jazz pianist and composer (1924–1993)

Background information
- Born: Giacinto Figlia; October 27, 1924; Palermo, Sicily
- Died: February 15, 1993 (aged 68) New York City, New York, U.S.
- Genre: Jazz
- Occupation: Musician
- Instrument: Piano
- Years active: 1943–1960, 1984–1993

George Wallington (October 27, 1924 – February 15, 1993) was an American jazz pianist and composer. Born in Sicily, his career as a pianist began in the early 1940s, when he played with Dizzy Gillespie and Charlie Parker and contributed to the development of bebop. Following several years as a sideman during the late 1940s, he formed his own group, experimenting with trios and a string ensemble before settling upon a permanent quintet.

During the 1950s, Wallington's quintet including rising stars Donald Byrd, Jackie McLean, and Phil Woods, but in 1960 he retired and moved to Florida to work for a family business. He returned to his previous career in the 1980s and made further recordings as a soloist before his death in 1993.

Noted for his technique and mastery of the developing styles of modern jazz, his contributions to the genre have been described as "underrated." His compositions, however, became known through recordings by Woody Herman's band and Miles Davis.

== Early life ==
Wallington was born Giacinto Figlia (some sources give Giorgio) in Sicily. His date of birth has been given as both 1923 and 1924, with his obituary in The New York Times identifying his date of birth as October 27, 1923 and other sources dating his birth to October 27, 1924.

Wallington moved to New York City with his family in 1925. His father sang opera and introduced his son to classical music, but after listening to saxophonist Lester Young and Count Basie's orchestra, he "was smitten with the expressive and emotional power of jazz."

He said that he acquired the name Wallington in high school because he liked "to wear flashy clothes [...] and the kids in the neighborhood would say, 'Hey, look at Wallington!'" According to his brother Peter, however, the nickname was given to him by tenor saxophonist Stan Getz.

During his teenage years, he studied at Juilliard, but left school at the age of 15 or 16 to play piano in New York. He began to use "Wallington" as his stage name at nightclub gigs in the city during the early 1940s.

== Career ==
=== 1943–1948: Bebop sideman ===
Dizzy Gillespie, a young trumpet player who was developing the style of jazz that came to be known as bebop, formed a band with bassist Oscar Pettiford, and drummer Max Roach to play regularly at the Onyx Club in 1943. An agreement with bandleader Cootie Williams to secure pianist Bud Powell for the gig fell apart, and after a short stint during which Billy Taylor used his intermissions from another club date to play with the group, Wallington was secured as the house pianist. He joined Gillespie and saxophonist Charlie Parker at the Three Deuces and became well known on 52nd Street. Jazz clarinetist Joe Marsala hired Wallington to join his band for about a year before the pianist secured a range of opportunities.

Starting in 1946, Wallington was hired by numerous soloists – including Gerry Mulligan, Al Cohn, and Kai Winding – as a sideman. Others with whom he played include Serge Chaloff, Allen Eager, Terry Gibbs, Zoot Sims, and Red Rodney. His best-known compositions from this era are "Lemon Drop," which was played by Woody Herman's band, and "Godchild," played for The Birth of the Cool recordings led by Miles Davis.

A recording session produced by Norman Granz included Charlie Parker and Wallington with strings but was not released. In fact, prior to 1949 Wallington had no records under his own name despite being one of the busiest musicians in New York. A recording of Wallington in Chaloff's band, one of the few from this period, indicated his playing style was "urgent and fiery...but with its own sense of time, touch and phrasing."

=== 1949–1960: Bandleader ===
His first opportunity to record as leader came in May 1949, when he recorded two trio tracks with bassist Curley Russell and drummer Charlie Perry for Savoy. The second half of this session included a septet with Jerry Lloyd, Kai Winding, Brew Moore, Mulligan, and the two members of his trio. Recording for his first trio album was completed two years later; Savoy's The George Wallington Trio paired four tracks from his 1949 session with several tracks from a trio session with Russell and Max Roach in November 1951. Critic Jim Todd praised Wallington's early work as "some of the finest piano that bebop has to offer," and in particular highlighted his trio work as showing his most confident playing from the period.

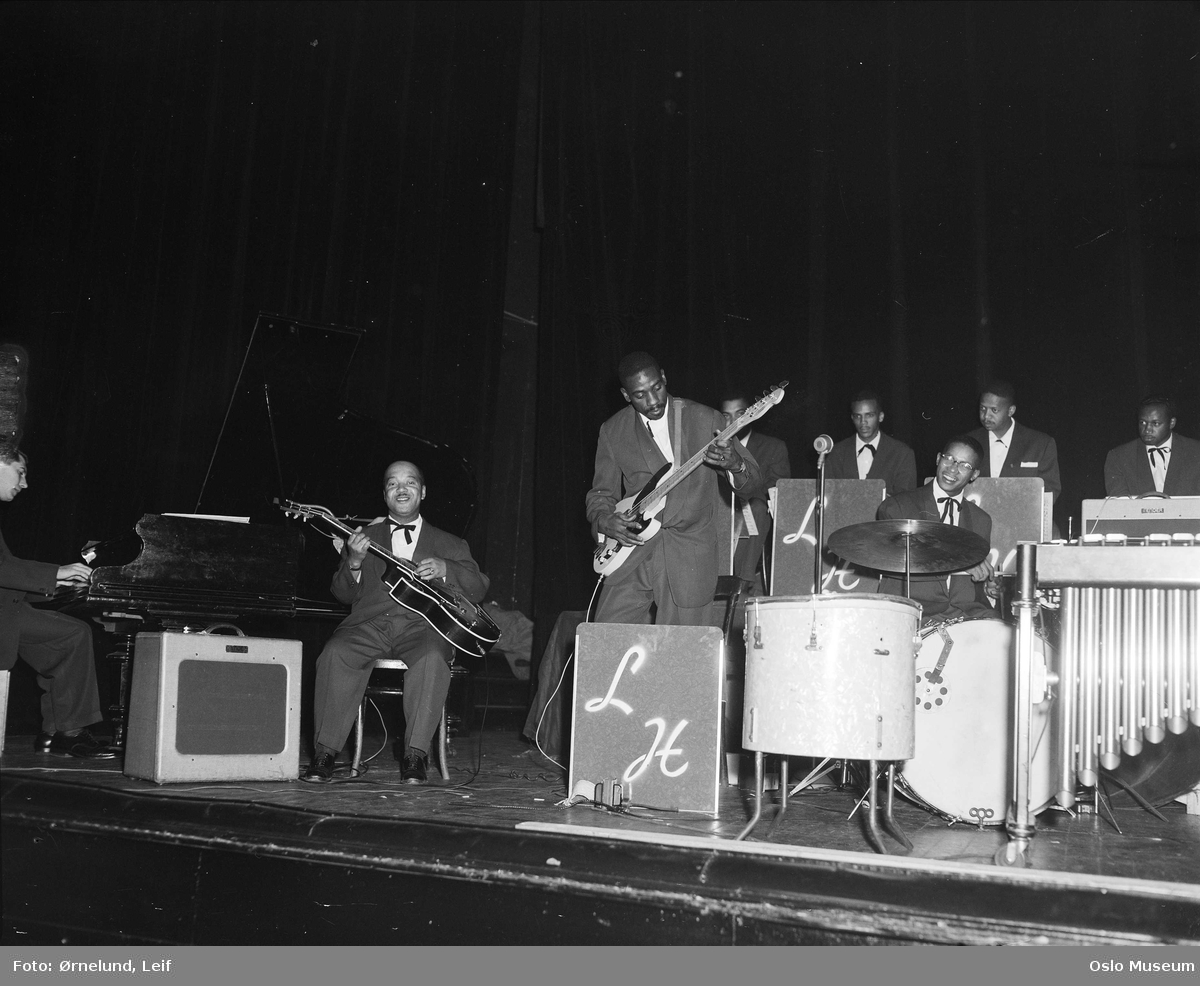
The Lionel Hampton Orchestra on tour in Europe, including Wallington (far left) at the piano

In 1952, baritone saxophonist Mulligan formed a jazz group in Los Angeles, California with young trumpet player Chet Baker. Mulligan invited Wallington to join the group as pianist, but he declined. The Mulligan-Baker Quartet as a result became one of the first piano-less jazz quartets and led to fame for both of the horn players.

Wallington continued to record with his trio in 1952, but switched to the Prestige label. A September session included Charles Mingus on bass as "Baron Fingus" and Roach on drums. Chuck Wayne joined the group for one track on mandola. In addition to continuing to record trio sessions for Prestige, Wallington in 1953 joined the Swedish All Stars under the arrangement of Quincy Jones and completed a recording session in late September in Paris with Pierre Michelot on bass and Jean-Louis Viale on drums. Wallington toured Europe with Lionel Hampton's big band in 1953. He and Annie Ross, however, left the band early following hecklers and boos at some of Hampton's concerts.

In 1954, Wallington formed his own ensemble in New York. Again working with arranger Quincy Jones, his ensemble's first recording session in May included trumpeter Dave Burns, trombonist Jimmy Cleveland, tenor saxophonist Frank Foster, and multi-instrumentalist Danny Bank on baritone saxophone and flute. The music from this session was released on the emerging Blue Note label. Two sessions later in the year for Norgran Records included a trio and strings, respectively, and presented another opportunity for Wallington to test the right instrumentation and stylistic approach for a permanent ensemble.

Wallington was given DownBeat's blindfold test for its February 23, 1955, issue. Presented with records by Jutta Hipp, Kenny Dorham, Ruby Braff, Art Tatum, and Mary Lou Williams, he singled out Bud Powell, Oscar Peterson, and Thelonious Monk for praise. He described Powell, after hearing a recording of the pianist playing "Glass Enclosure," as the most artistic of the pianists he heard during the test.

Wallington's live performance at the Café Bohemia in September 1955, Live! at Cafe Bohemia, saw the pianist settle on a quintet format as his permanent group. The first iteration of this group included Donald Byrd, Jackie McLean, Wallington, Paul Chambers, and Art Taylor. Byrd and McLean were "up-and-coming sidemen" at the time, and McLean, who was heavily influenced by Parker early in his career, was developing his own niche within the bop style. Wallington substituted McLean for Phil Woods and Chambers for Teddy Kotick and took his reformed quintet to the famous Van Gelder Studio to record Jazz for the Carriage Trade in January 1956.

1957 was the last year Wallington led a recording date before his semi-retirement in 1960. During several sessions that year, he was joined by Nick Stabulas, J. R. Monterose, Jerry Lloyd, and Knobby Totah. After some hard bop recordings during the mid-1950s, Wallington's last album from the period, Dance of the Infidels, returned to bebop.

=== 1960–1993: Retirement and comeback ===
In 1960, Wallington stopped playing music and moved to Florida to work in the family air conditioning business, citing the stress of endless touring. With more free time after ending his musical career, he took up skeet shooting and became an expert in the sport.

He returned to music in 1984 and recorded three albums, Virtuoso in 1984, Symphony of a Jazz Piano in 1986 and Pleasure of a Jazz Inspiration in 1992. He also performed at the 1985 Kool Jazz Festival in New York.

Wallington died on February 15, 1993, at Weill Cornell Medical Center, then known as New York Hospital, in New York City.

== Musical style ==
Described by Cook and Morton's Penguin Guide to Jazz as "the underrated master of bebop piano," his speed was called "breathtaking," and "his melodies unspooling in long, unbroken lines." His later quintet work has been classified as "somewhere amongst Art Blakey's early Jazz Messengers, Hank Mobley, Sonny Stitt, Johnny Griffin, and ... mid-'50s Mingus."

Wallington has been compared to fellow jazz pianists Al Haig, Bud Powell, and Dodo Marmarosa. His career has been noted as remarkably similar to that of Marmarosa, another Italian jazz pianist who was critical to bebop's development but who retired from public life in the relatively early stages of his career. Wallington himself cited Haig, Bud Powell, and Mel Powell as "his favorite contemporaries," and was particularly influenced by Earl Hines, Count Basie, and Art Tatum.

== Discography ==
=== As leader ===
Year recorded	Title	Label	Year released	Personnel/notes
1949, 1951	The George Wallington Trios and Septet	Savoy	1956	Trios, with Curly Russell (bass), Charlie Perry or Max Roach (drums); septet, with Jerry Lloyd (trumpet), Kai Winding (trombone), Brew Moore (tenor sax), Gerry Mulligan (baritone sax), Russell (bass), Perry (drums)
1952	George Wallington Trio	Progressive	1952	Trios, with Charles Mingus or Oscar Pettiford (bass), Max Roach (drums), Chuck Wayne (mandola, one track)
1953	George Wallington Trio	Prestige	1953	Trio, with Curly Russell (bass), Max Roach (drums)
1953	George Wallington Trio: Jazz Time Paris Vol. 9	Disques Vogue	1954	Trio, with Pierre Michelot (bass), Jean-Louis Viale (drums)
1953	Swingin' in Sweden	EmArcy	1958	Two sextet tracks, with Åke Persson (trombone), Arne Domnérus (alto sax), Lars Gullin (baritone sax), Simon Brehm (bass), Jack Noren (drums)
1954	The Workshop of the George Wallington Trio	Norgran	1954	Trio, with Curly Russell (bass), Art Taylor (drums)
1954	George Wallington Showcase	Blue Note	1954	Septet, with Dave Burns (trumpet), Jimmy Cleveland (trombone), Danny Bank (baritone sax), Frank Foster (tenor sax), Oscar Pettiford (bass), Kenny Clarke (drums)
1954	George Wallington with Strings	Norgran	1954	With Joseph Livoisi (violin), David Uchitel (viola), William Eder (cello), Clyde Lombardi (bass)
1955	George Wallington Quintet at the Bohemia (Featuring The Peck)	Progressive	1956	Quintet, with Donald Byrd (trumpet), Jackie McLean (alto sax), Paul Chambers (bass), Art Taylor (drums)
1956	Jazz for the Carriage Trade	Prestige	1956	One trio track, with Teddy Kotick (bass), Art Taylor (drums); five quintet tracks, with Donald Byrd (trumpet), Phil Woods (alto sax), Kotick (bass), Taylor (drums)
1956	Metronome All-Stars 1956	Clef	1956	One solo piano track ("Lady Fair")
1956	Knight Music: George Wallington Plays 5 Originals and 6 Standards	Atlantic	1957	Trio, with Teddy Kotick (bass), Nick Stabulas (drums)
1957	The New York Scene	Prestige	1957	One trio track, with Teddy Kotick (bass), Nick Stabulas (drums); five quintet tracks, with Donald Byrd (trumpet), Phil Woods (alto sax), Kotick (bass), Stabulas (drums)
1957	Jazz at Hotchkiss	Savoy	1958	One trio track, with Nabil Totah (bass), Nick Stabulas (drums); four quintet tracks, with Donald Byrd (trumpet), Phil Woods (alto sax), Totah (bass), Stabulas (drums)
1957	The Prestidigitator	East-West	1958	Quintet, with Jerry Lloyd (bass trumpet), J. R. Monterose (tenor sax), Teddy Kotick (bass), Nick Stabulas (drums); quartet, with Lloyd (bass trumpet) or Monterose (tenor sax), Kotick (bass), Stabulas (drums)
1957	Leonard Feather Presents Bop	Mode	1957	Quintets, with Phil Woods (alto sax), Idrees Sulieman or Thad Jones (trumpet), Curly Russell (bass), Art Taylor or Denzil Best (drums), Charles Parker Jr. (vocals, one track); Feather does not play
1984	Virtuoso	Interface	1984	Solo piano
1984	The Symphony of a Jazz Piano	Interface	1986	Solo piano
1985	The Pleasure of a Jazz Inspiration	VSOP	1992	Solo piano

=== As sideman ===
Year recorded	Leader	Title	Label	Year released	Notes
1946– 1949	Serge Chaloff	Memorial: We the People Bop	Cool & Blue	1992	Wallington appears on four tracks, recorded in 1947
1951	Gerry Mulligan	Mulligan Plays Mulligan	Prestige	1956	Reissue of two 10" LPs; aka Historically Speaking
1949– 1952	Stan Getz Zoot Sims	The Brothers	Prestige	1956	Wallington appears on four tracks recorded in 1952
1952	Gil Mellé	Gil Mellé Quintet/Sextet	Blue Note	1953	Four tracks; reissued on Mellé's The Complete Blue Note Fifties Sessions in 1998
1952	Annie Ross	Annie Ross Sings	Prestige	1953	Reissued on King Pleasure Sings/Annie Ross Sings, together with recordings by King Pleasure, in 1958
1949– 1953	Stan Getz	Early Stan	Prestige	1963	Wallington appears on five tracks recorded in 1949, with Terry Gibbs et al.
1950, 1954	Al Cohn	Al Cohn's Tones	Savoy	1956	Wallington appears on four tracks recorded in 1950
1957	Bobby Jaspar	Tenor and Flute	Riverside	1957	Aka Bobby Jaspar with George Wallington and Idrees Sulieman
