= The New York Scene =

Studio album by George Wallington
- Released: 1957
- Recorded: March 1, 1957
- Studio: Rudy Van Gelder Studio, Hackensack, New Jersey
- Genre: Hard bop
- Length: 38:45
- Label: Prestige

George Wallington chronology
Jazz for the Carriage Trade (1956)	The New York Scene (1957)	Live! at Cafe Bohemia (1992)

The New York Scene is an album by jazz pianist George Wallington, trumpet player Donald Byrd, alto saxophone player Phil Woods, bassist Teddy Kotick, and drummer Nick Stabulas recorded in 1957 and released the same year by Prestige Records.

== Reception ==
Jazz critic Scott Yanow noted, "The emphasis is on hard-swinging and this set should greatly please straightahead jazz fans." Richard Cook of The Penguin Guide to Jazz stated that Wallington's solos on the album, unlike those of his preceding albums, had "begun to skin bebop language back to something more elemental."

Professional ratings
Review scores
Source	Rating
Allmusic	4.5/5 stars
The Penguin Guide to Jazz	3.5/4 stars

== Track listing ==
All compositions by Phil Woods unless otherwise indicated

1. "In Salah" (Mose Allison) – 5:20
2. "Up Tohickon Creek" – 6:10
3. "Graduation Day" (Joe Sherman, Noel Sherman) – 4:50
4. "Indian Summer" (Al Dubin, Victor Herbert) – 7:05
5. "'Dis Mornin'" (Donald Byrd) – 8:00
6. "Sol's Ollie" – 7:20

== Personnel ==
- Donald Byrd – trumpet (except track 3)
- Phil Woods – alto saxophone (except track 3)
- George Wallington – piano
- Teddy Kotick – bass
- Nick Stabulas – drums
