= Brew Moore =

American jazz tenor saxophonist (1924–1973)

- Born: Milton Aubrey Moore; March 26, 1924; Indianola, Mississippi, U.S.
- Died: August 19, 1973 (aged 49)
- Genres: Jazz
- Occupation: Musician
- Instrument: Tenor saxophone

Milton Aubrey "Brew" Moore (March 26, 1924 – August 19, 1973) was an American jazz tenor saxophonist.

== Early life ==
He was born in Indianola, Mississippi, United States. Moore's formal musical training began at twelve, first on trombone, then clarinet before switching to tenor saxophone. Inspired by the style of Lester Young, he gained his first professional experience playing in a Texas territorial band the summer before entering college.

== Professional career ==
Moore left the University of Mississippi in his first year to pursue a performing career, with periods in New Orleans, Memphis and New York City (twice) between 1942 and 1947. In New York, he first heard the new music called bebop. As one who idolized Young (he even held his saxophone at the same unorthodox 120-degree angle), Moore was at first uncomfortable with it, but as he recalled for The New York Times critic John S. Wilson in 1968: "When I heard what Bird (Charlie Parker) had done for himself, I realized that Pres was not the complete messiah. So I combined Bird and Pres and my own thing."

Returning to New York in 1948, Moore became a fixture on the city's jazz scene, cutting his first sides as a leader ("Brew Moore and His Playboys," Savoy Records) and working with Machito's orchestra and Claude Thornhill's Big Band, the Kai Winding sextet, Stan Getz and George Wallington among others. In 1949, he joined three of the "four brothers" from Woody Herman's celebrated Second Herd (Getz, Zoot Sims, Al Cohn) plus Allen Eager in a session that resulted in the album The Brothers for the Prestige label. In the early 1950s, he gigged with Bird and other beboppers of note at venues like Birdland. Pianist Gene DiNovi described him as "a natural player. I remember him saying once that you should come to the saxophone as a child would—pick it up and blow. He had blond, straw-colored hair. Always with a farmer's cow-lick sticking up. He was a very simple, lovely person."

He left New York in 1954 for the West Coast, settling eventually in San Francisco where he found a congenial environment, fitting well into the Beat Generation culture personified by one of his acknowledged admirers, Jack Kerouac. In 1959, the heavy drinking that had early on given him his nickname took its toll, and he withdrew from the scene. He subsequently resurfaced in Europe. Based out of Copenhagen, Denmark, he would, with the exception of three years in New York (1967–1970), continue to perform there for the rest of his life, teaming with such fellow ex-pats as Kenny Drew and Sahib Shihab as well as European players Niels-Henning Ørsted Pedersen and Alex Riel. In August 1973, back in Copenhagen from a trip home to settle his late father's affairs (and, ironically, after years of economic uncertainty coming into a substantial inheritance), he fell down a flight of stairs in Tivoli Gardens and suffered the injuries that caused his death.

== Influence and legacy ==
In the liner notes for a Storyville Records issue, critic Alun Morgan suggests in liner notes for the CD reissue No More Brew that Moore's "total discography is small for a man of his musical stature" because of the saxophonist's unswerving adherence to his Lestorian roots. As critic Scott Yanow observed: "In the early '50s, [Moore] recorded . . . with fellow tenors Stan Getz, Al Cohn, Zoot Sims, and Alan Eager; at the time, they all sounded identical. Moore was the only one of the five who did not change his sound through the years."

Alternatively, Danish scholar Soren Schou has likened Moore's "epic melodist" playing to writing a novel and contrasted it with the concentrated "short story" approach practiced by post-Bird improvisers. Certainly Moore's expansive style of playing tested the attention span of post-bop era listeners. (In evidence of this, one is referred to his X-rated comments to an apparently less than fully engaged Stockholm audience while introducing "Manny's Tune" on "No More Brew," Storyville CD 8275, 1998.)

Moore himself told critic Ralph J. Gleason in 1954: "The idea of playing for me is to compose a different, not always better I'm afraid, melody on the tune and basis of the original song, rather than construct a series of chord progressions around the original chords." An idea the more pre-bop inclined Gleason clearly approved of, noting that Moore "has two absolutely golden gifts. He swings like mad and he has soul . . . he also has a priceless gift for phrasing. . . . When Brew says it, he says it simply, but it rings true."

== Discography ==
=== As leader ===
Year recorded	Title	Label	Year released	Personnel/Notes
1948–49	Brothers and Other Mothers: The Savoy Sessions	Savoy	1979	Quartet, with Gene DiNovi (piano), Jimmy Johnson (bass), Stan Levey (drums); septet, with Jerry Lloyd (trumpet), Kai Winding (trombone), Gerry Mulligan (baritone sax), George Wallington (piano), Curley Russell (bass), Roy Haynes (drums); six tracks previously released on 10" LP in 1953
1953	Fru'n Brew: Previously Unissued Recordings from the Open Door – with Tony Fruscella	Spotlite	1981	Quintet, with Fruscella (trumpet), Bill Triglia (piano), Teddy Kotick (bass), Art Mardigan (drums)
1954	The 1954 Unissued Atlantic Session – with Tony Fruscella	Fresh Sound	2011	Quintet, with Fruscella (trumpet), Bill Triglia (piano), Teddy Kotick (bass), Bill Heine (drums)
1955–56	The Brew Moore Quartet and Quintet	Fantasy	1956	Quartet, with John Marabuto (piano), Max Hartstein (bass), Gus Gustafson (drums); quintet, with Marabuto (piano), Hartstein (bass), Gustafson (drums), Dick Mills (trumpet)
1957–58	Brew Moore	Fantasy	1958	Quintets, with Harold Wylie (tenor sax), John Marabuto (piano), John Mosher (bass), John Markham (drums); Cal Tjader (vibes), Vince Guaraldi (piano), Dean Reilly (bass), Bobby White (drums)
1959; 1961	Danish Brew Featuring Brew Moore and Don Byas	Jazz Mark	1962	Moore appears on five tracks; quartets, with Bent Axen (piano), Niels-Henning Ørsted Pedersen (bass), William Schiøpffe (drums); Axen (piano), Ørsted Pedersen (bass), Alex Riel (drums)
1961	Live in Europe 1961	Sonorama	2015	Quartets, with Lars Bagge (piano), Lars Pettersson (bass), William Schiøpffe (drums); Poul Godske (piano), Niels-Henning Ørsted Pedersen (bass), Alex Riel (drums); Lou Bennett (organ), Jimmy Gourley (guitar), Kenny Clarke (drums)
1962	Brew Moore in Europe	Debut	1962	Quartet, with Bent Axen (piano), Niels-Henning Ørsted Pedersen (bass), William Schiøpffe (drums); quintets, with Axen (piano), Ørsted Pedersen (bass), Schiøpffe (drums), Sahib Shihab (alto sax, two tracks), Lars Gullin (baritone sax, two tracks), Louis Hjulmand (vibraharp, two tracks)
1965	If I Had You	SteepleChase	1981	Quartet, with Atli Bjørn (piano), Benny Nielsen (bass), William Schiøpffe (drums); reissued on Copenhagen Brew in 1998
1965	I Should Care	SteepleChase	1982	Quartet, with Atli Bjørn (piano), Benny Nielsen (bass), William Schiøpffe (drums); reissued on Copenhagen Brew in 1998
1966	Zonky	SteepleChase	2005	Quartet, with Kenny Drew (piano), Niels-Henning Ørsted Pedersen (bass), Makaya Ntshoko (drums)
1971	Brew's Stockholm Dew	Sonet	2005	Quartet, with Lars Sjösten (piano), Sture Nordin (bass), Fredrik Norén (drums); aka No More Brew (Storyville, 1981)
1971	No More Brew	Storyville	1998	Quartet, with Atli Bjørn (piano), Erik Mølbak (bass), Jual Curtis (drums); this session appears on a 1998 CD reissue of No More Brew

=== As sideman ===
- Slim Gaillard, At Birdland (Hep, 1979)
- Stan Getz, The Brothers (Prestige, 1956)
- Ray Nance, Body and Soul (Solid State, 1970)
- Cal Tjader, Tjader Plays Tjazz (Fantasy, 1956)
- Cal Tjader, Latin Kick (Fantasy, 1959)
- George Wallington, The George Wallington Trio (Savoy, 1956)
- Chuck Wayne, The Jazz Guitarist (Savoy, 1956)
