= Body and Soul (Ray Nance album) =

Studio album by Ray Nance
- Recorded: May 1969
- Genre: Jazz
- Label: Solid State

Professional ratings
Review scores
Source	Rating
AllMusic	4/5 stars
The Penguin Guide to Jazz	3/4 stars

Body and Soul is an album by Ray Nance, recorded in 1969.

== Recording and music ==
The album was recorded in May 1969. The tracks are an unusual combination, with originals, jazz standards such as the title track, and more contemporary compositions such as "A Hard Day's Night". Nance plays violin and has some vocals.

== Release ==
The album was released by Solid State Records.

== Reception ==
Both The Penguin Guide to Jazz and AllMusic commented on the moving performance of "Take the 'A' Train", which Nance had played at Billy Strayhorn's funeral.

== Track listing ==
1. "Take the 'A' Train"
2. "Get Happy"
3. "Sunny"
4. "Body and Soul"
5. "Mimi"
6. "A Hard Day's Night"
7. "Oh Happy Day"
8. "Stardust"
9. "She's Funny That Way"
10. "Jolie Janice"
11. "Guitar Amour"
12. "Tranquility"

== Personnel ==
- Ray Nance – violin, vocals
- Brew Moore – tenor sax
- Tiny Grimes – guitar
- Tommy Lucas – guitar
- Roland Hanna – piano, organ
- Jaki Byard – piano
- Carl Pruitt – bass
- Steve Little – drums
