= Morgana King =

American singer and actress (1930–2018)

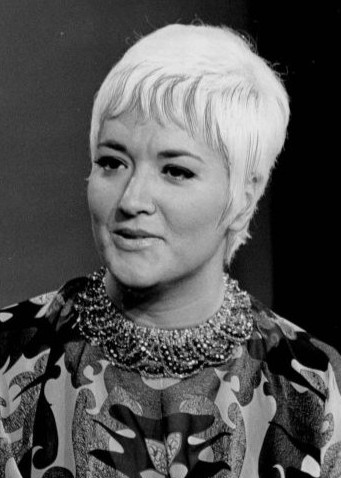
- King in 1968
- Born: Maria Grazia Morgana Messina; June 4, 1930; Pleasantville, New York, U.S.
- Died: March 22, 2018 (aged 87); Palm Springs, California, U.S.
- Occupations: Singer; actress
- Years active: 1946–1998
- Spouses: Tony Fruscella (m. 1947; div. 1956) Willie Dennis (m. 1961; died 1965)
- Children: 1
- Musical career
- Genres: Vocal jazz; cool jazz; jazz blues; bossa nova; bebop; traditional pop
- Instrument: Vocals
- Labels: Ascot; EmArcy; Mainstream; Mercury; Muse; Paramount; Reprise; Savoy; United Artists; Verve; Wing

Maria Grazia Morgana Messina (June 4, 1930 – March 22, 2018), better known as Morgana King, was an American jazz singer and actress. She began a professional singing career at sixteen years old. In her twenties, she was singing at a Greenwich Village nightclub when she was recognized for her unique phrasing and vocal range, described as a four-octave contralto range. She was signed to a label and began recording solo albums. She recorded dozens of albums well into the late 1990s.

King had her debut and breakout role in film as Mama Corleone in The Godfather (1972) and The Godfather Part II (1974). She had roles in three additional films including her last performance in A Brooklyn State of Mind in 1997.

She was twice married to fellow jazz musicians, first to Tony Fruscella and later to Willie Dennis. King died on March 22, 2018, in Palm Springs, California.

== Early life ==
King was born Maria Grazia Morgana Messina in Pleasantville, New York. Her parents were from Fiumefreddo di Sicilia, Province of Catania, Sicily, Italy. She grew up in New York City with five siblings. Her father, who owned a coal and ice business, played the piano and guitar by ear. Her family experienced a difficult financial period after her father died.

Around the age of thirteen her vocal gifts were recognized when she was overheard singing the aria "I'll See You Again" from Noël Coward's operetta Bitter Sweet. At age 16 she developed a love for big bands. A scholarship to the Manhattan School of Music soon followed.

== Singing debut ==
Her professional singing career began at age sixteen as Morgana King. When she sang in a Greenwich Village nightclub in 1953, a record label executive took an interest after being impressed with the unique phrasing and multi-octave range. Three years later in 1956, her first album, For You, For Me, For Evermore, was released.

== Film debut ==
In the first appearance of Leonard G. Feather's Encyclopedia of Jazz (1960), Morgana King stated that her ambition was "… to become a dramatic actress." She began her acting career in The Godfather, directed by Francis Ford Coppola, as Carmela Corleone, wife of Don Vito Corleone. In the film, she sang the song "Luna mezzo mare". She appeared in the television documentary The Godfather: Behind the Scenes (1971). She reprised the role in The Godfather Part II (1974), where her character dies aged 62, due to natural causes.

== Career ==
=== Singing ===
King headlined clubs, concert halls and hotels, and toured throughout the United States, Europe, Australia and South America; e.g.: Basin Street; bla-bla café; Blue Note; Blue Room at the Supper Club; Café Leon; Club Bali; Cotton Club; Fat Tuesday's; Jilly's; Joe Howard's Place; Kenny's Castaways; Lainie's Room; Les Mouches; Lush Life; Mr. Sam's; Rainbow Grill; Reno Sweeney; Scullers; Sniffen Court; Sweet Basil; The Metropole; Town Hall; the Waterbury Hotels; and Trude Heller's.

A few of the venue performances during her active career: the March 1956 Easter Jazz Festival at Town Hall in New York City; she opened Trude Heller's in July 1957 and returned throughout her career for anniversary performances; four months later, in November 1957, along with seven female jazz instrumentalists, she performed at the Jazz Female concert held at Carnegie Recital Hall; the Schaefer Music Festival in June 1976; A Tribute to Billie Holiday at the Hollywood Bowl in July 1979; the AIDS Research – Benefit Bash in 1983, the Benefit for the Theater Off Park in May 1988; the 2nd annual WPBX Jazz Festival at the Fine Arts Theater in August 1989. While performing in Lisbon, Portugal, she was interviewed by the television show host Henrique Mendes at the television station RTP (the sole television station at that time)."

=== Musicians ===
A limited list of artists who performed or recorded with King over the years of her career are Ben Aronov, Ronnie Bedford, Ed Caccavale (drums), Clifford Carter, Don Costa, Eddie Daniels, Sue Evans, Larry Fallon, Sammy Figueroa, John Kaye (percussion), Helen Keane, Art Koenig, Steve LaSpina, Scott Lee, Jay Leonhart, Ray Mantilla, Bill Mays, Charles McCracken, Ted Nash, Adam Nussbaum, Warren Odze, Joe Puma, Don Rebic, Jack Wilkins, Joe Williams (bass), and Torrie Zito.

=== Recording ===
Her repertoire contains more than two hundred songs on more than thirty albums. Most of her recordings and re-issues have not remained in the catalogs.

In 1964, she received a Grammy Award nomination for Best New Artist. The award went to the Beatles.

The UCLA Music Library's Jimmy Van Heusen papers include a letter dated September 5, 1965 pertaining to "songs… to be given to Morgana King." She recorded three songs by Van Heusen: "Here's That Rainy Day" (on It's a Quiet Thing, 1965), "Like Someone in Love" (on Stardust, 1986; and Another Time, Another Space, 1992) and "Imagination" (on Looking Through The Eyes Of Love, 1998). King's 1967 single "I Have Loved Me A Man" appeared in the US "Easy Listening" survey and the Australian Top 20, according to the Kent Music Report.

=== Television ===
Beginning with The Andy Williams Show and The Hollywood Palace in 1964, for more than a decade she performed on television talk and variety shows including The Mike Douglas Show, The Dean Martin Show and The David Frost Show.

=== Retirement ===
King announced her retirement from performing during an engagement at the Cotton Club in Chicago on Friday, December 10, 1993, and added that her recording would not be affected by the decision. She continued to perform after that date at the Ballroom, Maxim's, Mirage Night Club (a benefit jazz session), and Roosevelt Hotel's Cinegrill. Her last film appearance was in the film A Brooklyn State of Mind (1997).

== Personal life ==
=== Relationships and family ===
King married twice. Her first marriage (when she was 17 years old) was to jazz trumpeter Tony Fruscella (1927–1969), who was 20 at the time. The marriage ended in divorce after nine years; they had a daughter, Graysan (1950–2008). During their marriage, the couple frequently had Sunday dinner with Charlie Parker and his family.

Her second marriage, in 1961, was to jazz trombonist Willie Dennis (né William DeBerardinis; 1926–1965), whom she met during an off-night visit to the Birdland Jazz Club where she went to hear Sam Donahue's group. He had performed with both Gerry Mulligan and Charles Mingus and recorded the 1953 album release, Four Trombones on Mingus' record label, Debut Records. He had toured extensively with Benny Goodman, Woody Herman and Buddy Rich.

She traveled to Brazil with Dennis to experience this "new" music style when he toured with Rich in 1960. She said the experience was "an introduction to myself." Their close collaboration was suddenly shattered in 1965 with his death from an automobile accident in New York's Central Park. It's a Quiet Thing (Reprise, 1965) is a memorial to him.

After Dennis's death, King relocated and lived for more than two decades in Malibu, California. She accepted Frank Sinatra's offer to record three albums on his record label Reprise Records (It's a Quiet Thing (1965), Wild Is Love (1966) and Gemini Changes (1967)).

=== Death ===
King owned a condo in Palm Springs, California. She died, aged 87, of non-Hodgkin's lymphoma in Palm Springs on March 22, 2018.

=== Influence ===
There have been reports that, as a child, King lived near a synagogue and was intrigued by the singing of the cantor. Some have theorized that King's unique singing style was due, in part, to the singing of a cantor that she carried in her memories. King's voice is notable for its four-octave contralto range. She continued to pursue new forms of expression and presentation by exploring current music trends, which can be heard and read from the list of songs and composers on more than thirty albums. She ventured into new creative areas throughout her career, all the while keeping contact with her musical point of origin in jazz. Her distinctive sound has its criticism and detractors.

In literature, the Library of Jazz Standards by Ronny Schiff (2002) recognizes Morgana King as one of the performers who made famous the songs "Imagination" (Van Heusen, Burke), "Like Someone in Love" (Van Heusen, Burke) and "Will You Be Mine" (Adair, Dennis). Also, there is the occasional mention of her in fiction.

King has been credited with composing "Moe's Blues", a song recorded by Beverly Kenney on Beverly Kenney Sings for Johnny Smith (1955), and "Simply Eloquent", with Monte Oliver, which appears on an album of the same title, initially released in 1986 by Muse Records. In 1991, she produced a set of seminars called Morgana King Fine Arts Series. The seminars brought together small groups for recurring meetings every few months held at select venues including Lincoln Center. One of the functions of the series was to familiarize participants with performance methodologies. There was a panel available to critique the performances.

Her signature song is "A Taste Of Honey", originally released on the album With A Taste of Honey (Mainstream Records, 1964). Her most re-issued songs are "My Funny Valentine", from Everything Must Change (Muse, 1978), and the title track of For You, For Me, For Evermore (EmArcy Records, 1956).

== Filmography ==
Films
Year	Title	Role	Notes
1972	The Godfather	Mama Corleone	
1974	The Godfather Part II	Mama Corleone	
1978	Nunzio	Mrs. Sabatino	
1987	A Time to Remember, aka Miracle in a Manger	Mama Theresa	
1997	A Brooklyn State of Mind	Aunt Rose	(final film role)

Television
Year	Title	Role	Notes
1964	The Andy Williams Show	Variety show	Performed "Corcovado" with Andy Williams (sn 2, ep 4).
1964	The Hollywood Palace	Variety show	Performed "A Taste Of Honey (sn 3, ep 6)"
1965	The Mike Douglas Show	Talk show	Herself (sn 4, ep 28)
1966	The Hollywood Palace	Variety show	Herself (sn 4, ep 3)
1966	The Hollywood Palace	Variety show	Herself (sn 4, ep 7)
1966	The Dean Martin Show	Variety show	Performed "Mountain High, Valley Low". Also performed "Loch Lomond" and "Goodnight, Irene" with Dean Martin. (sn 1, ep 27)
1967	The Mike Douglas Show	Talk show	Herself (sn 5, ep 87)
1968	The Rosey Grier Show	Talk show	Herself
1968	The Pat Boone Show	Variety show	Herself
1968	The Woody Woodbury Show	Talk show	Herself
1968	The Dean Martin Show	Variety show	Performed "I Have Loved Me A Man". Also performed "So Long", "Now Is The Hour" and "Auld Lang Syne" with Dean Martin. (sn 3, ep 29)
1968	The Dean Martin Show	Variety show	Performed "When The World Was Young" (sn 4, ep 8)
1969	Playboy After Dark	Variety show	Herself (sn 1, eps 3 & 12)
1970	The David Frost Show	Talk show	Herself
1971	The Godfather: Behind the Scenes	Documentary	Herself
1971	The Mike Douglas Show	Talk show	Herself (sn 9, ep 114)
1971	The Virginia Graham Show	Talk show	Herself
1972	The David Frost Show	Talk show	Herself (sn 4, ep 130)
1972	The Virginia Graham Show	Talk show	Herself
1972	The Mike Douglas Show	Talk show	Herself (sn 10, ep 105)
1972	The Mike Douglas Show	Talk show	Herself (sn 10, ep 165)
1973	The Mike Douglas Show	Talk show	Herself (sn 10, ep 170)
1974	The Mike Douglas Show	Talk show	Herself
1976	Jigsaw John: Thicker Than Blood	Series	Zoe Pappas
1977	The Godfather Saga	Mini-series	Mama Corleone (ep numbers 1.1 through 1.4)
1985	Deadly Intentions	TV movie	Anna Livanos
1993	All My Children	Soap opera	Promotional title "The Summer of Seduction"; Mrs. Manganaro

== Videography ==
Year	Title	Format	Available
1992	The Godfather Trilogy: 1901–1980	Archive footage	No
2001	Gordon Willis on Cinematography (Uncredited: Carmela Corleone)	Archive footage	No
2004	The Godfather: Widescreen Edition	DVD	Yes
2004	The Godfather Part II (1974): Widescreen; Dubbed; Re-mastered	DVD	Yes
2005	A Tribute To Billie Holiday: Recorded Live At the Hollywood Bowl (1979)	DVD: Morgana King interview and performances: "Easy Living", As Time Goes By" and "God Bless The Child"	No
2005	A Brooklyn State of Mind	DVD	Yes
2005	A Brooklyn State of Mind	DVD	Yes
2006	The Godfather Part II: Restored	DVD	Yes
2008	The Godfather: The Coppola Restoration	DVD	Yes
2008	The Godfather: Restored Trilogy	BD, DVD	Yes

== Notes ==
- D'Acierno, Pellegrino. The Italian American Heritage, A Companion to Literature and Arts (1998), p. 434; ISBN 0-8153-0380-7
- Inman, David. Television Variety Shows, Histories and Episode Guides to 57 Programs (2005), pp. 250–51, 293; ISBN 0-7864-2198-3
- Meil, Eila. Casting Might-Have-Beens, A Film by Film Directory of Actors Considered For Roles Given To Others (2005) p. 102; ISBN 0-7864-2017-0
- Ross, Wallace A. Best TV & Radio Commercials, Volume 1 (1967), pp. 103, 153
- Shaw, Arnold. 52nd Street: The Street Of Jazz (1977), pp. 321, 338; ISBN 0-306-80068-3
- Shilts, Randy. And The Band Played On (2007); p. 331; ISBN 0-312-37463-1
- Thomas, Sam. Best American Screenplays 3, Complete Screenplays (1995), pp. 7, 62; ISBN 0-517-59104-9
- Review, The Godfather New York Times, March 16, 1972 by Vincent Canby.
- Rolling Stone January 3, 1974 Archived July 14, 2011, at the Wayback Machine, Issue 151
- Singing, 20th century. History.com Encyclopedia
- Westways Volume 69 (1967), p. 55
