= Jump for Joy (Peggy Lee album) =

Studio album by Peggy Lee
- Released: 1958 (mono); 1959 (stereo)
- Recorded: December 5, 20, 1957; January 3, 1958
- Genre: Vocal jazz
- Length: 34:37
- Label: Capitol
- Producer: Lee Gillette

Peggy Lee chronology
| Sea Shells (1959) | Jump for Joy (1958) | Things Are Swingin' (1959) |

Jump for Joy is an album by jazz singer Peggy Lee that was released in 1958 and arranged and conducted by Nelson Riddle.

== Track listing ==
1. "Jump for Joy" (Duke Ellington, Sid Kuller, Paul Francis Webster) - 2:07
2. "Back in Your Own Backyard" (Dave Dreyer, Al Jolson, Billy Rose) - 2:26
3. "When My Sugar Walks Down the Street" (Gene Austin, Jimmy McHugh, Irving Mills) - 1:58
4. "I Hear Music" (Burton Lane, Frank Loesser) - 2:07
5. "Just in Time" (Betty Comden, Adolph Green, Jule Styne) - 2:50
6. "Old Devil Moon" (Yip Harburg, Burton Lane) - 2:58
7. "What a Little Moonlight Can Do" (Harry M. Woods) - 2:41
8. "Four or Five Times" (Byron Gay, Marco H. Hellman) - 2:33
9. "Music! Music! Music!" (Bernie Baum, Stephen Weiss) - 2:30
10. "Cheek to Cheek" (Irving Berlin) - 2:37
11. "Glory of Love" (Billy Hill) - 2:37
12. "Ain't We Got Fun?" (Richard A. Whiting, Gus Kahn, Raymond B. Egan) - 2:12

== Personnel ==
- Peggy Lee – vocals
