= Little Girl Blue (song) =

Song
- Published: 1935
- Composer: Richard Rodgers
- Lyricist: Lorenz Hart

Audio example
- "Little Girl Blue" by Nina Simone (2013 – Remaster)" on YouTube

"Little Girl Blue" is a popular song with music by Richard Rodgers and lyrics by Lorenz Hart, published in 1935. The song was introduced by Gloria Grafton in the Broadway musical Jumbo.

== Film appearances ==
- 1950 The Jackpot
- 1962 Billy Rose's Jumbo – sung by Doris Day
- 1990 The Handmaid's Tale
- 2022 Saint Omer – sung by Nina Simone

== Recordings ==
Many popular and jazz artists have recorded the tune, including:

- The Afghan Whigs - Debonair (1994)
- Chet Baker - Chet Baker Meets Space Jazz Trio (1988)
- Polly Bergen – Little Girl Blue (1955)
- Donald Byrd – Byrd in Flight, as "Little Boy Blue": (Blue Note 1960)
- Ann Hampton Callaway – To Ella with Love (1996)
- Barbara Cook - From the Heart: The Best of Rodgers and Hart (1959)
- Sam Cooke – My Kind of Blues (1961)
- Doris Day – Billy Rose's Jumbo (1962)
- Ethel Ennis – Eyes for You (1964)
- Ella Fitzgerald – Ella Fitzgerald Sings the Rodgers & Hart Song Book (1956)
- Judy Garland – Alone (1957)
- Red Garland – A Garland of Red (Prestige 1956)
- The Four Freshmen – Love Lost (1959)
- Johnny Hartman – And I Thought About You (1959)
- The Hi-Lo's - Now Hear This.
- Milt Jackson – Reverence and Compassion (1993)
- Harry James
- Joni James – Little Girl Blue (1956)
- Keith Jarrett – Standards in Norway (1995)
- Janis Joplin – I Got Dem Ol' Kozmic Blues Again Mama! (1969, although the lyrics on this version were rearranged)
- Morgana King - It's a Quiet Thing (1965)
- Diana Krall – From This Moment On (2006)
- Stacey Kent – Dreamsville (2001)
- Brenda Lee – Reflections in Blue (1964)
- Grant Green – Oleo with Sonny Clark (1962)
- Eddie Harris – Exodus to Jazz (1961)
- John Lewis – The John Lewis Piano (1957)
- Hank Mobley – Mobley's Message (Prestige 1956)
- Gerry Mulligan with Jon Eardley – California Concerts (1954)
- Anita O'Day – Anita O'Day and Billy May Swing Rodgers and Hart (1960)
- Oscar Peterson – My Favorite Instrument (solo piano)
- The Postal Service (a remix of the Nina Simone version) - Verve Remixed 3 (2005)
- Sue Raney – Sue Raney, Volume II (2004)
- Linda Ronstadt – For Sentimental Reasons (1986)
- Diana Ross – Touch Me in the Morning (1973)
- Mathilde Santing Combo - Hand In Hand (1983)
- The Carpenters – Lovelines (1989)
- Rosemary Clooney – Rosemary Clooney Sings Rodgers, Hart & Hammerstein (1990)
- Carly Simon – My Romance (1990)
- Nina Simone (whose 1958 debut album Little Girl Blue was named after the song)
- Frank Sinatra – Songs for Young Lovers (1954)
- Sarah Vaughan – Sarah Vaughan Sings Broadway: Great Songs from Hit Shows (1958)
- Margaret Whiting – this charted briefly in 1947
- Nancy Wilson - Hello Young Lovers (1962)
- Pinky Winters – Pinky (1954)
- Louis Armstrong – Pops Is Tops-The Verve Studio Albums (2018)
- Laura Mvula – Music from and Inspired by 12 Years a Slave (2013)
