= John Mosher =

American jazz bassist and composer

John Mosher (1928–1998) was an American jazz bassist, classical bassist and composer who worked, recorded and toured with a wide range of primarily West Coast artists from the 1950s through the mid-1990s.

== Early years ==
A native of Sioux City, Iowa, John Mosher was raised on the city's west side, the son of a vaudeville-era bandleader. He studied piano and violin as a child. While attending Central High School he was befriended by veteran big band sideman Johnny Kopecky, under whom he studied both the double bass and violin. After military service in an Army band near the close of World War II, Mosher returned to Sioux City where he landed a steady job as bassist in the house band led by tenor sax player Don Couch at the Turin Inn, a venerable Sioux City jazz club that regularly featured big name touring jazz artists—including the Bud Powell Trio. He then moved to Boston for concentrated double bass studies at the Schillinger Institute, which later became the Berklee School of Music.

== Professional biography ==
In 1949, Mosher got his first major professional engagement when he joined the Les Brown Band, with whom he toured widely. While in Los Angeles with the Brown band, Mosher also performed some local LA club dates with both Zoot Sims and Chet Baker. Leaving the Brown band the following year, Mosher enrolled at the University of Iowa to continue his musical education.

He moved to California in 1955 where he immediately found work with both the Glenn Miller Orchestra—then under the direction of Jerry Gray—and with pianist Conley Graves. Mosher recorded with Graves on two sessions that became the LPs Genius at Work and VIP: Very Important Pianist, released on the Liberty label. Mosher's bowed solos on several tracks of these sessions was a bold departure from the jazz norm of the time and was only paralleled by a then-up-and-coming Paul Chambers. Relocating to San Francisco in 1957, Mosher quickly established himself as an in-demand bassist and worked in the house bands at both the Hungry I and Purple Onion clubs and also made regular appearances at the Hangar Club accompanying, at various times, both pianist Earl Hines and vibraphonist Cal Tjader. Tjader subsequently included Mosher's original composition, "SS Groove" on his Concert On Campus album.

Mosher worked often with Bay-Area pianist John Marabuto and drummer John Markham and the three musicians became known locally as the JM Trio. The tight team of Mosher, Marabuto and Markham became the nucleus for the Brew Moore Quintet and together backed Moore on most of his recording sessions in 1957 - 1958 that were subsequently released on LP under the eponymous title Brew Moore in 1958. This album, which contained some of Moore's finest work, and is one of his few recordings, became a rare commodity after Moore's untimely death in Europe, and copies of the LP became a collector's item for jazz aficionados for many years. It was re-released on CD in the early 2000s.

Mosher next joined the Red Norvo ensemble and again went on tour. In 1960, this ensemble recorded albums with singers Dinah Shore and Frank Sinatra, and Mosher appeared in a scene with Norvo's combo in the original 1960 version of the Sinatra film Ocean's 11. Returning to San Francisco, Mosher became staff bassist for ABC TV's daytime Tennessee Ernie Ford Show and backed Ford on two blues-oriented LPs in the early 1960s. Concurrently Mosher worked by night as house bassist at the San Francisco Playboy Club and frequently also appeared at Club Neve. Mosher also recorded an album with Art Van Damme for release in Germany on the BASF Label in 1971. Throughout the next decade Mosher continued to work regularly in the studios and occasionally appeared on dates with husband and wife artists Jackie Cain and Roy Kral, with whom Mosher also recorded in 1993.

An equally talented classical bassist, Mosher occasionally performed with the Griller Quartet string ensemble in appearances in the San Francisco area, including appearances on KQED. Mosher succumbed to cancer in 1998.

Of Mosher, the San Francisco Gate wrote, 'He was among the best, best known and most appealing of Bay Area bassists: friendly, witty, generous with his time.'
