= Jean-Louis Viale =

French jazz drummer (1933–1984)

Jean-Louis Viale (January 22, 1933, Neuilly-sur-Seine – May 10, 1984, Paris) was a French jazz drummer.

Viale played early in his career with Sacha Distel and Rene Urtreger, then took a gig at the club Le Tabou in Paris, playing with Jimmy Gourley, Bobby Jaspar, and Henri Renaud. He also played at the Club Saint-Germain in the early 1950s. He worked with Distel regularly through the 1950s and played with Clifford Brown, Frank Foster, Stan Getz, Stephane Grappelli, Gigi Gryce, Thelonious Monk, Jimmy Raney, Django Reinhardt, Zoot Sims, Martial Solal, René Thomas, George Wallington, Barney Wilen, and Lester Young. In the early and mid-1960s, Viale worked often as a sideman and session musician, with Raymond Fol, Johnny Griffin, Roger Guerin, Ivan Jullien, and Eddy Louiss, but in 1968 was involved in a car crash that temporarily sidelined his career. He returned in 1969 to work again with Rene Thomas and Stephane Grappelli, as well as with Jim Hall and Barney Kessel. In the 1970s, he worked with Benny Bailey, Jack Dieval, Johnny Hammond Smith, and Slide Hampton, as well as with Rene Urtreger on several occasions.
