= Jazz for the Carriage Trade =

Studio album by George Wallington
- Released: 1956
- Recorded: January 20, 1956
- Studio: Van Gelder Studio, Hackensack, New Jersey
- Genre: Jazz, hard bop
- Length: 36:06
- Label: Prestige

George Wallington chronology
| Live! at Cafe Bohemia (1956) | Jazz for the Carriage Trade (1956) | The New York Scene (1957) |

Jazz for the Carriage Trade (Note: The title refers to the colloquial term carrier trade", category of wealthy customers, those who can afford owning a carriage) is a 1956 album recorded by George Wallington's quintet with Donald Byrd on trumpet and Phil Woods on alto saxophone and released by Prestige Records the same year. The pianist and the front line were joined by Teddy Kotick on bass and Art Taylor on drums to make up the rhythm section.

== Reception ==
Jazz critic Scott Yanow noted, "The music falls between bebop and hard bop with Woods sounding quite strong while Byrd comes across as a promising (but not yet mature) youngster. A fine example of this somewhat forgotten but talented group, easily recommended to bop collectors." Richard Cook of The Penguin Guide to Jazz gave the album 3 of 4 stars, describing it as more straight-ahead than Wallington's album The New York Scene.

Professional ratings
Review scores
| Source | Rating |
|---|---|
| Allmusic | 4/5 stars |
| The Penguin Guide to Jazz | 3/4 stars |

== Track listing ==
All compositions by George Wallington unless otherwise indicated

1. "Our Delight" (Tadd Dameron) – 5:37
2. "Our Love is Here to Stay" (George Gershwin) – 5:31
3. "Foster Dulles" – 5:06
4. "Together We Wail" – 6:51
5. "What's New" (Bob Haggart) – 7:12
6. "But George" – 5:49

== Personnel ==
- Donald Byrd – trumpet
- Phil Woods – alto saxophone
- George Wallington – piano
- Teddy Kotick – bass
- Art Taylor – drums
