= Sea Shells =

Compilation album by Peggy Lee
- Released: 1958
- Recorded: February 7 & March 31, 1956
- Genre: Jazz poetry; folk
- Length: 40:20
- Label: Decca
- Producer: Milt Gabler

Peggy Lee chronology
The Man I Love (1957)	Sea Shells (1958)	Jump for Joy (1958)

Professional ratings
Review scores
Source	Rating
AllMusic	3/5 stars
Record Mirror	3/5 stars

Sea Shells is an album by jazz singer Peggy Lee that was released in 1958.

== Track listing ==
1. "Sea Fever" (Friedrich Silcher, Eleanor Chaffee) – 2:03
2. "Nine Thorny Thickets" (Rolfe Humphries, Johnny Mercer) – 4:59
3. "Little Old Car" (Henry Beau, Peggy Lee) – 1:11
4. "Greensleeves" (Traditional) – 1:58
5. Chinese Love Poems: "The Fisherman"/"Autumn Evening" (Li Po)/(Po) – 2:18
6. "The Happy Monks" (Lee) – 1:00
7. "The White Birch and the Sycamore" (Lee, Willard Robison, Hubert Wheeler) – 4:00
8. "Of Such Is the Kingdom of God" (Ernest Holmes, Irma Glenn) – 3:13
9. "A Brown Bird Singing" (Royden Barrie, Haydn Wood) – 2:59
10. "I Don't Want to Play in Your Yard" (Henry W. Petrie, Philip Wingate) – 2:32
11. "The Maid With the Flaxen Hair" (Claude Debussy) – 1:00
12. "The Wearing of the Green" (Traditional) – 2:32
13. "Chaconde (Le Bon Petit Roi d' Yvetot)" (Marcel Grandjany) – 1:38
14. Chinese Love Poems: "Going Rowing"/"Like the Moon"/"The Music" (Po)/(Po)/(Po) – 2:46
15. "The Riddle Song" (Traditional) – 3:55
16. "The Gold Wedding Ring" (Lee, Harry Sukman) – 2:16

== Personnel ==
- Peggy Lee – vocals
- Stella Castellucci – harp
- Gene DiNovi – harpsichord
