= The Brothers (album) =

Studio album by Stan Getz and Zoot Sims
- Released: 1956
- Recorded: April 8, 1949 & September 8, 1952
- Genre: Jazz
- Length: 43:23
- Label: Prestige PRLP 7022

Zoot Sims chronology
The Brothers (1956)	Zoot Sims All Stars (1953)

Stan Getz chronology
Early Stan (1948)	The Brothers (1949)	Stan Getz Quartets (1949)

Professional ratings
Review scores
Source	Rating
Allmusic	4/5 stars
The Penguin Guide to Jazz Recordings	2.5/4 stars

The Brothers is a studio compilation album by American saxophonists Stan Getz and Zoot Sims released in 1956 via Prestige label.

== Background ==
The four sides recorded on April 8, 1949, were released on the New Jazz and Prestige labels in 1949 and 1950 (New Jazz 802 and 818, and Prestige 724). The label listed the artist as the Stan Getz Tenor Sax Stars. Prestige compiled the songs into an album for the first time in 1956, at that time adding four additional songs by Zoot Sims and Al Cohn. a record that was later re-released many times. In its first form as an album, the eight-song record was labeled as PRLP-7022. When Fantasy/Prestige released the album in the Compact Disc format (c. 1992), they added three previously released alternate takes from the 1949 session that had been in the vaults.

== Reception ==
Stephen Cook of AllMusic stated "The music on this LP recalls the airy "Four Brothers" sound that tenor saxophonists Stan Getz, Zoot Sims and Herbie Steward, and baritone saxophonist Serge Charloff, plied in Woody Herman's band of 1947... A 1952 sextet date led by Sims and Cohn is also included, offering up another round of original and buoyantly swinging cuts, bolstered by lively contributions from trombonist Kai Winding and solid rhythmic support by pianist George Wallington, bassist Percy Heath, and drummer Art Blakey. A fine release that nicely showcases the cool, proto-West Coast bop forged by both these soloists and Miles Davis".

== Track listing ==
The Brothers track listing
No.	Title	Writer(s)	Length
1.	"Five Brothers"	Gerry Mulligan	3:10
2.	"Five Brothers" (Alternate take on selected reissues)	Gerry Mulligan	3:34
3.	"Battle of the Saxes"	Al Cohn	3:52
4.	"Battleground"	Al Cohn	3:46
5.	"Battleground" (Alternate take on selected reissues)	Al Cohn	3:31
6.	"Four and One Moore"	Gerry Mulligan	3:22
7.	"Four and One Moore" (Alternate take on selected reissues)	Gerry Mulligan	3:15
8.	"The Red Door"	Zoot Sims	4:34
9.	"Zootcase"	Zoot Sims	4:18
10.	"Tangerine"	Victor Schertzinger	4:24
11.	"Morning Fun"	Al Cohn	5:37
Total length:			43:23

== Personnel ==
- Zoot Sims – tenor saxophone
- Al Cohn – tenor saxophone
- Allen Eager – tenor saxophone (tracks:1–7)
- Brew Moore – tenor saxophone (tracks: 1–7)
- Stan Getz – tenor saxophone (tracks: 1–7)
- Kai Winding – trombone (tracks: 8–11)
- George Wallington – piano (tracks: 8–11)
- Walter Bishop – piano (tracks: 1–7)
- Gene Ramey – bass (tracks: 1–7)
- Percy Heath – bass(tracks: 8–11)
- Charlie Perry – drums (tracks: 1–7)
- Art Blakey – drums (tracks: 8–11)

(Tracks 8–11 released in 1953 on 10 inch Prestige LP Zoot Sims All-Stars)

=== Production ===
- Don Martin – artwork
- Bob Weinstock – supervisor
- Joe Tarantino – digital remastering
