= Tony Fruscella =

American jazz trumpeter

- Born: February 4, 1927; Orangeburg, New York, U.S.
- Died: August 14, 1969 (aged 42) New York City
- Genres: Jazz
- Occupation: Musician
- Instrument: Trumpet
- Years active: 1948–1960

Tony Fruscella (February 4, 1927 – August 14, 1969) was an American jazz trumpeter.

== Biography ==
Tony Fruscella and his sister Maria, grew up in Greenwich Village, Manhattan, New York. He played in an Army band early in his career. He worked as a sideman in the 1950s for Charlie Barnet, Lester Young, Gerry Mulligan (1954), and Stan Getz(1955). He played with Don Joseph later in the 1950s, but by the early 1960s his problems with drug abuse and alcoholism prevented him from performing. Fruscella released one album, I'll Be Seeing You (1955), as a leader during his lifetime. It was recorded with Allen Eager and Danny Bank) for Atlantic Records.

He was married to singer Morgana King. The marriage ended in divorce after nine years.

== Discography ==
- Tony Fruscella (Atlantic, 1955)
- Fru'n Brew with Brew Moore (Spotlite, 1981)
- Debut (Spotlite, 1981)
- The 1954 Unissued Atlantic Session (Fresh Sound, 2011)

== Notes ==
- Harrison, Max. Modern Jazz, The Essential Records, A Critical Selection (1975) pp. 61 – ISBN 0-904619-01-X
- Yanow, Scott. The Trumpet Kings, The Players Who Shaped the Sound of Jazz Trumpet (2001) pp. 162 – ISBN 0-87930-640-8
- Kerouac, Jack. Lonesome Traveler (fiction) 1989 – Page 115 – ISBN 0-8021-3074-7
- Stan Getz: Nobody Else But Me by Dave Gelly (2002) pp. 68 – ISBN 0-87930-729-3
- Fifties Jazz Talk: An Oral Retrospective by Jack Gordon (2004) pp. 71- ISBN 0-8108-4997-6
- The Biographical Encyclopedia of Jazz by Leonard Feather, Ira Gitler (2007) pp. 76 – ISBN 0-19-532000-X
- The Jazz Discography by Tom Lord (1993) ISBN 1-881993-18-3
- The Penguin Guide to Jazz by Richard Cook, Brian Morton (2002) pp. 536 – ISBN 0-14-101416-4
