= Johnny Bothwell =

American jazz musician

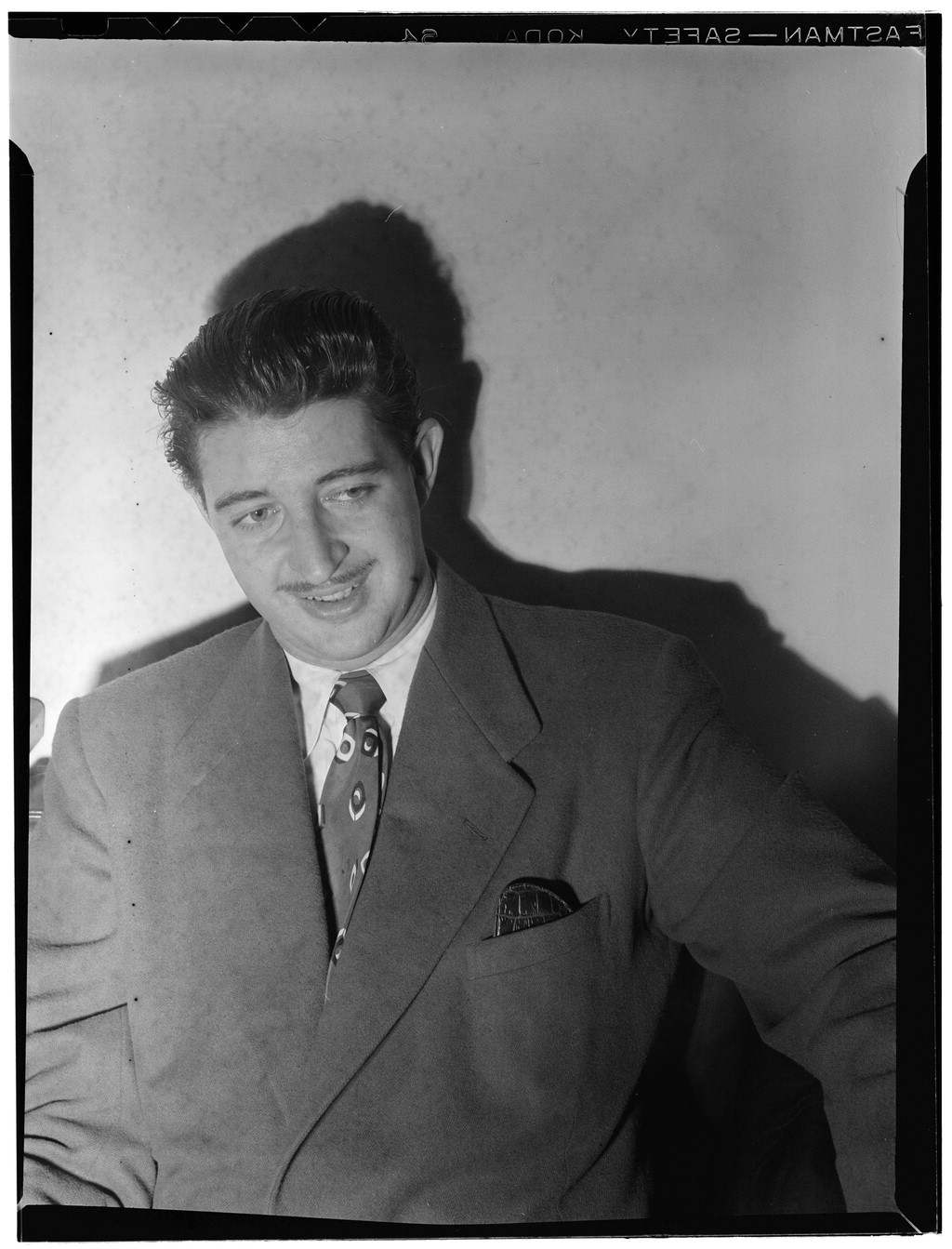

Background information
- Born: May 23, 1919; Ross Township, Lake County, Indiana, U.S.
- Died: September 12, 1995 (aged 76); Lakeland, Florida, U.S.
- Genres: Jazz
- Instruments: Alto saxophone

Johnny Bothwell (May 23, 1919 – September 12, 1995) was an American jazz alto saxophonist and bandleader.

== Career ==
Bothwell played in Chicago in 1940 and then moved to New York City, playing with Woody Herman (1943) and Sonny Dunham (1944–46). He was a key member and featured soloist of Boyd Raeburn's groups in 1944–1945, and played with Gene Krupa in 1945. He formed his own groups between 1945 and 1949, and held a residency at the Tin Pan Alley Club in Chicago as well as in New York and Boston.

Bothwell gave up music after 1949 and moved to Miami. He owned a number of bands but did not return to playing for the rest of his life.
