= It's a Quiet Thing =

Studio album by Morgana King
- Released: 1965
- Recorded: 1965
- Genre: Jazz
- Label: Reprise RS 6192

Morgana King chronology
With a Taste of Honey (1965)	It's a Quiet Thing (1965)	Morgana King (1966)

It's a Quiet Thing is a 1965 album by Morgana King with arrangements by Torrie Zito.

The AllMusic Review by Eugene Chadbourne felt that King's "brilliant presence" on the album's title track was "impossible to live up to" over the ten songs on the album. He praised Zito's "sophisticated and classy, indeed outright lush arrangements" but compared King's unique vocal style of "enunciation and pyrotechnics" to both Tiny Tim and Yma Sumac. Chadbourne concluded that "Any tendency to dismiss King outright would be a mistake, however. Like other somewhat eccentric vocalists, such as Al Hibbler and Betty Carter, aspects that seem inexplicable or tasteless at first listening are guaranteed to grow on the listener".

The initial Billboard magazine review from January 29, 1966 commented that King "proves the point that artistry and commercial appeal can blend as witnessed in this exceptional package" and praised her performances of Antonio Carlos Jobim's "Useless Landscape" and "Dindi" as "priceless".

It's a Quiet Thing was also reviewed in Sounds and Fury, Stereo Review and American Record Guide.

The song It's A Quiet Thing originates from the first musical of Kander and Ebb - Flora the Red Menace which premiered on Broadway in 1965.

== Track listing ==
1. "It's a Quiet Thing" (Fred Ebb, John Kander) – 3:02
2. "Dindi" (Ray Gilbert, Antonio Carlos Jobim, Aloysio de Oliveira) – 4:00
3. "Useless Landscape" (Gilbert, Jobim, de Oliveira) – 3:12
4. "Gone with the Wind" (Herbert Magidson, Allie Wrubel) – 2:58
5. "Little Girl Blue" (Lorenz Hart, Richard Rodgers) – 3:35
6. "Mountain High, Valley Low" (Bernie Hanighen, Raymond Scott) – 2:09
7. "How Insensitive" (Norman Gimbel, Jobim, Vinícius de Moraes) – 03:14
8. "Here's That Rainy Day" (Johnny Burke, Jimmy Van Heusen) – 02:38
9. "Deep Song" (George Cory, Douglass Cross) – 03:38
10. "If You Should Leave Me (E Se Domani)" (Arthur Altman, Giorgio Calabrese, Al Stillman) – 03:01

== Personnel ==
- Morgana King – vocals
- Torrie Zito – arranger
