= Allen Eager =

American jazz saxophonist (1927–2003)

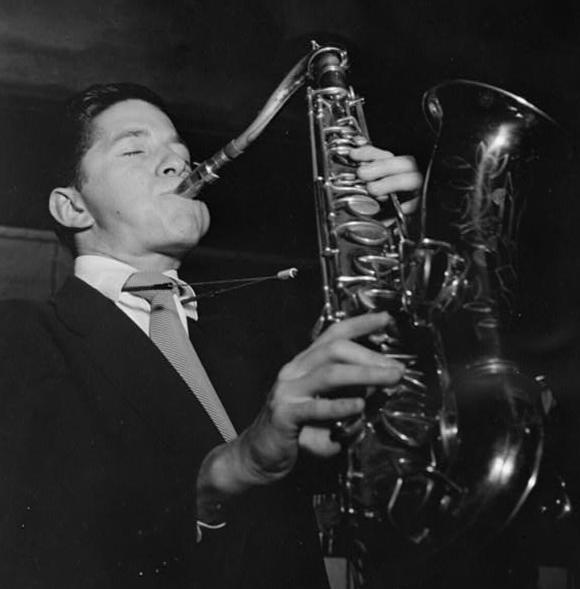
- Allen Eager at the Arcadia Ballroom, New York, c. May 1947; Photography by William P. Gottlieb

Background information
- Born: January 10, 1927; New York City
- Died: April 13, 2003 (aged 76) Daytona Beach, Florida
- Genre: Jazz
- Occupations: Musician, composer
- Instruments: Tenor saxophone Alto saxophone

Allen Eager (January 10, 1927 – April 13, 2003) was an American jazz tenor and alto saxophonist who also competed in auto racing and took part in LSD experiments.

== Early life ==
Allen Eager was born in New York City on January 10, 1927. He grew up in the Bronx. According to Denise McCluggage, Eager could read aged 3, and learned to drive at the age of 9 with the help of his mother, after she caught him driving a garbage truck near the hotels that his parents owned in the Catskill Mountains. He took clarinet lessons with David Weber of the New York Philharmonic at the age of 13.

== Early career in jazz ==
Eager briefly played with Woody Herman at the age of 15. At the same age, he took heroin for the first time. Aged 16, he played in the band of Bobby Sherwood, then went on to play with Sonny Dunham, Shorty Sherock, and Hal McIntyre. Eager was then with Herman again in 1943–44, Tommy Dorsey, and Johnny Bothwell in 1945. After World War II he became a regular on the scene around 52nd Street in New York; he led his own ensemble there from 1945 to 1947. His recording debut as leader was for Savoy Records in February 1946. His band consisted of Ed Finckel (piano), Bob Carter (bass), and Max Roach (drums); two of the tracks formed Eager's first release as leader. His playing style on tenor saxophone was, along with contemporary saxophonists Zoot Sims, Stan Getz, Al Cohn and others, strongly influenced by Lester Young; Eager appears to have been the first of this group to follow Young's light sound on tenor, and was the best known and most respected of them at that point. Young's assessment was that "Allen Eager is [...] the best of the grey boys [white players]". At the same time as following Young in sound, Eager also adopted the musical forms pioneered in bebop. He also adopted the drug dependency of a lot of the bebop players in the 1940s.

Unusually for a white saxophonist of the time, Eager was a member of several bands led by black musicians. These included Coleman Hawkins, with whom he recorded in 1946, and beboppers Fats Navarro and Charlie Parker in 1947. Eager recorded with trumpeter Red Rodney for Keynote Records in 1947. Also in the late 1940s, Eager recorded with saxophonist Stan Getz. Eager also played with Tadd Dameron at the Royal Roost in New York in 1948. Some of these concerts were broadcast on the radio. Critic Ira Gitler commented positively on the concerts: "Whatever he played swung with a happy, light-footed quality and pure-toned beauty".

From around this period, some rich women "sought out jazz musicians for a connection to a way of life otherwise denied them". One of these, heiress Peggy Mellon Hitchcock, became associated with Eager, and the pair often appeared in newspaper gossip columns. One instance was much later, when a court case that highlighted the fact that Eager had borrowed $48,500 from her attracted publicity.

Eager played with Gerry Mulligan in 1951, with Terry Gibbs in 1952, and shortly after with Buddy Rich. He then briefly abandoned music and became a ski and horse riding instructor. Eager's drug addiction could clearly be linked to his music career, as Ira Gitler noted: "when he was skiing or horseback riding and completely away from music, he was healthy, but every time he returned to his tenor, the demon that pursued Bird [Charlie Parker] found him again". From 1953 to 1955 he again led his own ensemble as a saxophonist. He frequently played with Howard McGhee, including in Chicago in early 1956. He lived in Paris from 1956 to 1957, and continued playing there. Back in the U.S. in 1957, Eager recorded The Gerry Mulligan Songbook under Mulligan's leadership, which was his last recording for 25 years. After this, he essentially retired from jazz. Eager mentioned the death of Charlie Parker (in 1955) and his own problems with drug addiction as reasons for his withdrawal from the scene. Eager appears in Jack Kerouac's 1958 book The Subterraneans as the character Roger Beloit.

== Later life ==
Eager went on to pursue other activities such as skiing, competitive auto racing, and LSD experiments with Timothy Leary. He became a ski patroller when the Hunter Mountain ski resort opened, and was there introduced to racing car driver Denise McCluggage. After some instruction from McCluggage, the pair raced in the 12 Hours of Sebring in 1961 in a Ferrari 250 GT, finishing tenth overall, first in GT and first in class. Encouraged by their success, they flew the car to Europe and took part in the 1000 km Nürburgring; Eager crashed. They entered an O.S.C.A. for the 1962 Sebring race, in which Eager and Ken Miles collided, and for a race at the Bridgehampton Race Circuit, at which McCluggage crashed. In July 1963 a serious crash left Eager with broken bones.

Eager occasionally dabbled in music again, playing alto saxophone with Charles Mingus at the rebel Newport Jazz Festival in 1960. Ira Gitler noted that "The years away from his horn had made him rusty; moreover, the old fire and fine timing were heard only in fleeting moments". In the late 1960s he settled in Florida with his family. He played with Frank Zappa in the 1970s. In 1982 Eager made a comeback with an album for Uptown Records, entitled Renaissance. The pianist for this quartet session, Hod O'Brien, remembers Eager making a very slow start: "it was as though he had never blown a sax before [... but] slowly and surely, the lines got clearer and longer. It was as though he learned to play again in the space of half an hour". O'Brien described Eager as "a temperamental guy" who, during a first-night concert around the time of their recording, fired the rhythm section that had been hired to play with him, because he wanted to change from playing straight-ahead jazz to free. Eager toured with Dizzy Gillespie in 1983. Eager played in England in May of the same year, playing jazz standards in his familiar 1940s style that included "terse, sidelong phrases". Some other tours in Europe were with Chet Baker.

He died from liver cancer on April 13, 2003, in Daytona Beach, Florida. He was survived by his ex-wife, Nancy, two daughters, a son, and two granddaughters.

== Discography ==
This section contains only albums, some of which were made up in part of tracks previously or simultaneously released as singles. Tracks and albums have often been reissued and repackaged; where possible, only an early release is listed.

An asterisk (*) indicates that the date is that of release.

=== As leader ===
Year recorded	Title	Label	Notes
1982*	Renaissance	Uptown Records	Quartet, with Hod O'Brien (piano), Teddy Kotick (bass), Jimmy Wormworth (drums)

=== As sideman ===
Year recorded	Leader	Title	Label	Notes
1946	Coleman Hawkins	New 52nd Street Jazz	RCA	Eager plays on four tracks; the others are by a Dizzy Gillespie group
1948	Tadd Dameron	Fats Navarro Featured with the Tadd Dameron Quintet	Jazzland	With Fats Navarro (trumpet), Rudy Williams (alto sax), Curly Russell (bass), Kenny Clarke (drums); radio broadcast
1948	Tadd Dameron	The Tadd Dameron Band 1948	Jazzland	With Fats Navarro (trumpet), Rudy Williams (alto sax), Curly Russell (bass), Kenny Clarke (drums); radio broadcast
1948	Fats Navarro	The Fabulous Fats Navarro, Vol. 2	Blue Note	With Wardell Gray (tenor sax), Tadd Dameron (piano), Curly Russell (bass), Kenny Clarke (drums), Chino Pozo (bongos)
1949	Stan Getz	Stan Getz, Vol. 1	New Jazz	With Al Cohn, Brew Moore, Zoot Sims (tenor saxes), Stan Getz (tenor sax, baritone sax), Walter Bishop Jr. (piano), Gene Ramey (bass), Charlie Perry (drums)
1949	Stan Getz	The Brothers	Original Jazz Classics	Personnel as on Stan Getz, Vol. 1
1951	Gerry Mulligan	Mulligan Plays Mulligan	Prestige	
1954	George Handy	Handyland USA	Label "X"	With Ernie Royal (trumpet), Dave Schildkraut (alto sax), Kai Winding (trombone), Vinnie Burke (bass), Art Mardigan (drums)
1955	Tony Fruscella	Tony Fruscella	Atlantic	
1957	Gerry Mulligan	The Gerry Mulligan Songbook	Prestige	With Lee Konitz (alto sax), Zoot Sims (tenor sax, alto sax), Al Cohn (tenor sax, baritone sax), Freddie Green (guitar), Henry Grimes (bass), Dave Bailey (drums)
1957	Gerry Mulligan	Mosaic Select 21	Mosaic	

=== Compilations that include previously unreleased recordings ===
Year recorded	Title	Label	Notes
1946–47	Brothers and Other Mothers	Savoy	Compiles singles and alternative takes from various leaders, plus tracks without Eager
1947	Brothers and Other Mothers, Vol. 2	Savoy	Compiles singles and alternative takes from various leaders, plus tracks without Eager
1947	Saturday Night Swing Session	Counterpoint	Led by Fats Navarro (trumpet), with Bill Harris (trombone), Charlie Ventura (tenor sax), Ralph Burns (piano), Al Valente (guitar), Chubby Jackson (bass), Buddy Rich (drums); radio broadcast, plus tracks without Eager
1947	Anthropology	Spotlite	With Fats Navarro (trumpet), John LaPorta (clarinet), Charlie Parker (alto sax), Lennie Tristano (piano), Billy Bauer, (guitar), Tommy Potter (bass), Buddy Rich (drums); radio broadcast, plus tracks without Eager
1947	The Complete Keynote Collection	Mercury	Compiles singles and alternative takes from various leaders, plus tracks without Eager. Tracks with him are led by Red Rodney (trumpet), with Serge Chaloff (baritone sax), Al Haig (piano), Chubby Jackson (bass), Tiny Kahn (drums)
1948	Al Haig Meets the Master Saxes, Vol. 2	Spotlite	Combines sessions led by Eager, Dave Lambert, all featuring Al Haig (piano)
1947–53	In the Land of Oo-Bla-Dee, 1947–1953	Uptown	Compiles 1947 private recording, 1949 television performance, 1953 concert broadcast
