= Live! at Cafe Bohemia =

Live album by George Wallington
- Released: 1956
- Recorded: September 9, 1955
- Venue: Cafe Bohemia
- Genre: Jazz, bebop, hard bop
- Length: 53:11
- Label: Progressive

George Wallington chronology
Live! at Cafe Bohemia (1956)	Jazz for the Carriage Trade (1956)

Live! at the Cafe Bohemia is a live album by George Wallington's quintet that was recorded in 1955 and released in 1956 by the Progressive label.

== Reception ==
Professional ratings
Review scores
Source	Rating
Allmusic	4.5/5 stars
The Penguin Guide to Jazz	3/4 stars

Jazz critic Scott Yanow praised the album and classified its content as both bebop and hard bop. He noted that the band's "brand of hard bop will be enjoyed by straightahead jazz fans." Allmusic's assigned rating for the album was 4.5 of 5 stars.

The Penguin Guide to Jazz described the album as "tough and darting" and assigned it three stars.

== Track listing ==
1. "Johnny One Note" (Lorenz Hart, Richard Rodgers) – 8:25
2. "Sweet Blanche" (Wallington) – 6:59
3. "Minor March" (Jackie McLean) – 6:45
4. "Snakes" – 5:55
5. "Jay Mac's Crib" (Kenny Clarke) – 8:38
6. "Bohemia After Dark" (Oscar Pettiford) – 8:22
7. "Minor March" (alternate take) (McLean) – 7:43

== Personnel ==
- Donald Byrd – trumpet
- Jackie McLean – alto saxophone
- George Wallington – piano
- Paul Chambers – bass
- Art Taylor – drums
