= For You, for Me, for Evermore =

Song composed by George Gershwin

"For You, for Me, for Evermore" is a song composed by George Gershwin, with lyrics by Ira Gershwin.

Written around 1936-7, it was rediscovered by Ira Gershwin when he was preparing music for The Shocking Miss Pilgrim (1946), where it was introduced by Dick Haymes and Betty Grable.

== Notable recordings ==
- Margaret Whiting - a single release for Capitol Records (catalog No. 294) (1946).
- Artie Shaw and His Orchestra (vocal by Mel Tormé) - recorded in July, 1946 for Musicraft Records (catalog No. 412).
- Dick Haymes and Judy Garland - a single release for Decca Records (catalog No. 23687). This briefly charted in 1947 in the No. 19 spot.
- 1959 Ella Fitzgerald on Ella Fitzgerald Sings the George and Ira Gershwin Song Book recorded on the Verve label.
- Clint Eastwood released a version as a single in 1962 on GNP Crescendo Records
