= The Best of Mose Allison =

Compilation album by Mose Allison
- Released: 1970
- Recorded: 1962–1972
- Genre: Jazz, blues
- Length: 53:39
- Label: Atlantic

Mose Allison chronology
I've Been Doin' Some Thinkin' (1968)	The Best of Mose Allison (1970)	Hello There, Universe (1970)

The Best of Mose Allison is a compilation album by Mose Allison. It includes some of the jazz pianist and singer's best-known recordings for Atlantic Records. The album was originally released in 1970 as an LP record with 12 songs. The album was re-issued on a CD in 1988 with an additional eight songs and new sequencing.

== Critical reception ==
Professional ratings
Retrospective reviews
Review scores
Source	Rating
AllMusic	4.5/5 stars

An AllMusic reviewer gave it four and a half out of five stars and called it "a pretty good capsule introduction to one of American music's most idiosyncratic individualists". However, he noted "For a more comprehensive – and well-packaged – overview of most of his career, turn to the double-CD box Allison Wonderland on Rhino/Atlantic."

== Track listing ==
All songs Written by Mose Allison except as noted. Original LP

Side one

1. "Your Mind Is on Vacation" – 2:35
2. "Swingin' Machine" – 2:31
3. "Stop This World" – 3:24
4. "Seventh Son" (Willie Dixon) – 3:36
5. "New Parchman" – 3:04
6. "Rollin' Stone" (McKinley Morganfield) – 2:58

Side two

1. "I'm the Wild Man" (Stanley Willis, Don Barksdale) – 1:58
2. "If You're Goin' to the City" – 3:49
3. "I Don't Worry About a Thing" – 2:17
4. "Your Molecular Structure" – 2:05
5. "Everybody Cryin' Mercy" – 2:39
6. "I Love the Life I Live" (Willie Dixon) – 2:26

1988 CD re-issue

1. "I Don't Worry About a Thing" – 2:41
2. "Your Mind Is on Vacation" – 2:35
3. "It Didn't Turn Out That Way" – 2:41 (bonus track)
4. "If You're Goin' to the City" – 3:49
5. "Swingin' Machine" – 2:31
6. "I Ain't Got Nothin' But the Blues" (Duke Ellington, Don George) – 3:56 (bonus track)
7. "Stop This World" – 3:24
8. "I'm the Wild Man" (Stanley Willis, Don Barksdale) – 1:58
9. "New Parchman" – 3:04
10. "Rollin' Stone" (McKinley Morganfield) – 2:58
11. "Don't Forget to Smile" – 2:48 (bonus track)
12. "Seventh Son" (Willie Dixon) – 2:26
13. "I Love the Life I Live" (Willie Dixon) – 2:21
14. "What's With You" – 2:55 (bonus track)
15. "That's the Stuff You Gotta Watch" (Buddy Johnson) – 2:10 (bonus track)
16. "Your Molecular Structure" – 2:05
17. "Just Like Livin'" – 1:44 (bonus track)
18. "Everybody Cryin' Mercy" – 2:39
19. "Night Club" – 2:36 (bonus track)
20. "One of These Days" – 4:29 (bonus track)

== Personnel ==
- Mose Allison – piano, vocals, producer (tracks 16–18)
- Addison Farmer – double bass (1–7)
- Osie Johnson – drums (1–3)
- Jimmy Knepper – trombone (4–7)
- Jimmy Reider – tenor sax (4–7)
- Frankie Dunlop – drums (4–7)
- Ben Tucker – bass (8–11)
- Ron Lundberg – drums (8–11)
- Stan Gilbert – bass (12–13)
- Mel Lee – drums (12–13)
- Earl May – bass (14–15)
- Paul Motian – drums (14–15)
- Red Mitchell – bass (16–18)
- Bill Goodwin – drums (16–18)
- Chuck Rainey – bass guitar (19)
- Billy Cobham – drums (19)
- Al Porcino – trumpet (20)
- David Sanborn – alto sax (20)
- Joe Farrell – tenor sax (20)
- Jack Hannah – bass (20)
- Jerry Granelli – drums (20)
- Nesuhi Ertegün – producer (1–15)
- Arif Mardin – producer (14–15)
- Joel Dorn – producer (19)
- Ilhan Mimaroglu – producer (20)
- Tom Dowd – engineer (1–7)
- Phil Iehle – engineer (1–3, 8–11, 14–15)
- Joe Atkinson – engineer (4–7)
- Wally Heider – engineer (12–13)
- Dave Weichman – engineer (16–18)
- Lewis Hahn – engineer (19)
- Carmen Rubino – engineer (20)
