= Just a Little Lovin' (disambiguation) =

Just a Little Lovin' is a 2008 Dusty Springfield tribute album by Shelby Lynne.

Just a Little Lovin' may also refer to:

- "Just a Little Lovin' (Will Go a Long Way)", a 1948 song by Eddy Arnold
- "Just a Little Lovin'", a 1968 song by Dusty Springfield from Dusty in Memphis, covered by several performers
- Just a Little Lovin' (Carmen McRae album), 1970
- "Just a Little Lovin'", a song by Carmen Electra from Carmen Electra
