= Look Here =

Look Here may refer to:

- "Look Here", a song by Mose Allison on the 1964 album The Word from Mose, covered by The Clash
- Look Here, an American television show of 1957–1958 hosted by Martin Agronsky
- Look Here (horse), a British Thoroughbred racehorse
