= Mose Alive! =

Live album by Mose Allison
- Released: 1966
- Recorded: October 22–31, 1965
- Venue: The Lighthouse, Hermosa Beach, CA
- Genre: Jazz
- Label: Atlantic
- Producer: Nesuhi Ertegun

Mose Allison chronology
Wild Man on the Loose (1965)	Mose Alive! (1966)	I've Been Doin' Some Thinkin' (1968)

Mose Alive! is a live album by American pianist, vocalist and composer Mose Allison recorded at the Lighthouse Café in California for the Atlantic label in 1965.

== Reception ==
Professional ratings
Review scores
Source	Rating
AllMusic	3/5 stars
Record Mirror	3/5 stars

Allmusic awarded the album 3 stars.

== Track listing ==
All compositions by Mose Allison except as indicated

1. "Smashed" – 2:20
2. "Seventh Son" (Willie Dixon) – 2:30
3. "Fool's Paradise" (Jesse Fuller) – 3:36
4. "I Love the Life I Live" (Dixon) – 2:26
5. "Since I Fell for You" (Buddy Johnson) – 2:47
6. "Love for Sale" (Cole Porter) – 5:17
7. "Baby, Please Don't Go" (Joe Williams) – 2:40
8. "That's Alright" (Jimmy Rogers) – 2:28
9. "Parchman Farm" – 3:11
10. "Tell Me Somethin'" – 2:30
11. "The Chaser" – 6:44

== Personnel ==
- Mose Allison – piano, vocals
- Stanley Gilbert – bass
- Mel Lee – drums
