= Creek Bank =

Studio album by Mose Allison
- Released: 1958
- Recorded: August 15, 1958
- Studio: Van Gelder Studio, Hackensack, New Jersey
- Genre: Blues, jazz
- Label: Prestige; PRLP 7152
- Producer: Bob Weinstock

Mose Allison chronology
Ramblin' with Mose (1958)	Creek Bank (1958)	Autumn Song (1959)

Creek Bank is the fourth album to be released (but fifth album recorded) by blues/jazz pianist and vocalist Mose Allison which was recorded in 1958 and released on the Prestige label. It was reissued on CD, coupled with Young Man Mose, by Original Jazz Classics.

== Reception ==
Professional ratings
Review scores
Source	Rating
Allmusic	4/5 stars
The Penguin Guide to Jazz	3.5/4 stars
The Rolling Stone Jazz Record Guide	3/5 stars

Scott Yanow, in his review for Allmusic, says it is his "typically ironic vocals that are most memorable, particularly Allison's classic "The Seventh Son" and "If You Live." His piano playing, even with the Bud Powell influence, was beginning to become original and he successfully performs both revived swing songs and moody originals".

== Track listing ==
All compositions by Mose Allison except where noted.

1. "The Seventh Son" (Willie Dixon) – 2:36
2. "If I Didn't Care" (Jack Lawrence) – 4:25
3. "Cabin in the Sky" (Vernon Duke, John La Touche) – 4:04
4. "If You Live" – 2:31
5. "Yardbird Suite" (Charlie Parker) – 3:21
6. "Creek Bank" – 4:34
7. "Moon and Cypress" – 4:00
8. "Mule" – 3:51
9. "Dinner on the Ground" – 3:14
10. "Prelude to a Kiss" (Duke Ellington, Irving Gordon, Irving Mills) – 4:12

== Personnel ==
- Mose Allison – piano, vocals
- Addison Farmer – bass
- Ronnie Free – drums
