= My Kinda Love =

1929 popular song by Louis Alter and Jo Trent

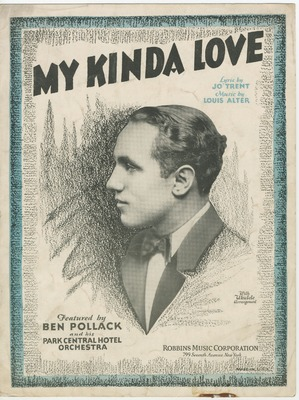
Sheet music cover, 1929

"My Kinda Love"
1929 recording by The Singing Boys & Their Novelty Orchestra

"My Kinda Love", also recorded as "My Kind of Love", is a popular song with music by Louis Alter and lyrics by Jo Trent, published in 1929. The song was used in the short lived Americana show in 1928.
Bing Crosby recorded the song on three occasions. The first was with the Dorsey Brothers Orchestra recorded on January 26, 1929 for Okeh Records. The writer, Gary Giddins commenting on the session said "Best of all is "My Kinda Love," a flimsy song that he projects stirringly without a trace of the frangible crooning style." Crosby re-recorded the song a few weeks later on March 14, 1929 with a trio for Columbia Records and this was the first occasion that he would be top-billed on a record. In 1954, Crosby recorded the song again for his album Bing: A Musical Autobiography.

== Lyrics ==
My kinda love,
your kinda love
Keeps me believing,
although you're deceiving
My kinda love,
one way to paradise

My kinda lips,
your kinda lips
When love comes stealing,
encourage that feeling
My kinda love,
one way to paradise

Although you're happy today
You may be gone tomorrow
Love comes but once,
don't be a dunce
When you need it,
steal it, beg or borrow

I'm fond of you,
you're fond of me
Tell me you love me
and hug me and squeeze me
My kinda love,
one way to paradise

== Other recorded versions ==
- Mose Allison (1958) - "Young Man Mose" (Prestige 7137)
- Ernestine Anderson for her album My Kinda Swing (1960)
- Nat King Cole recorded in 1960 and included in the album Nat King Cole at the Sands (1966).
- Doris Day - included in her album What Every Girl Should Know (1960).
- Ella Fitzgerald - included in her album Ella Swings Lightly (1958).
- Claude Hopkins and his orchestra (vocal: Beverly White) recorded April 21, 1937 for Decca Records (1316).
- Gerry Mulligan - Gerry Mulligan '63 The Concert Jazz Band
- Lurlean Hunter - from her album Blue and Sentimental (1960).
- Patti Page recorded as "My Kind of Love" and included in her album In the Land of Hi-Fi (1956).
- Ben Pollack and his Park Central Orchestra - recorded March 5, 1929 for Victor (21944)
- Ann Richards - on her album Two Much! (1961)
- Art Farmer - Mirage (1982)
- Kay Starr - included in her album I Cry By Night (1962)
- Sarah Vaughan - recorded for the Musicraft label (1946)
