= Takes to the Hills =

Studio album by Mose Allison
- Released: 1961
- Recorded: December 21, 1959 – January 11, 1960; June 28 – September 9, 1960; May 16, 1961
- Genre: Blues / Jazz
- Length: 37:31
- Label: Epic
- Producer: Teo Macero

Mose Allison chronology
I Love the Life I Live (1960)	Takes to the Hills (1961)	I Don't Worry About a Thing (1962)

This album was re-issued in 1966 as V-8 Ford Blues.

== Track listing ==
All compositions by Mose Allison except as indicated

1. "V-8 Ford Blues" (Willie Love) – 2:11
2. "Please Don't Talk About Me When I'm Gone" (Sidney Clare, Sam H. Stept) – 1:26
3. "Baby, Please Don't Go" (Big Joe Williams) – 2:32
4. "Hey, Good Lookin'" (Hank Williams) – 1:41
5. "I Love the Life I Live" (Willie Dixon) – 2:22
6. "I Ain't Got Nobody" (Roger Graham, Spencer Williams) – 1:51
7. "Back on the Corner" – 1:54
8. "Life Is Suicide" (Percy Mayfield) – 2:44
9. "'Deed I Do" (Walter Hirsch, Fred Rose) – 1:55
10. "Ask Me Nice" – 2:32
11. "You're a Sweetheart" (Harold Adamson, Jimmy McHugh) – 2:11
12. "Mad with You" (Lightnin' Hopkins) – 2:10

== Personnel ==
Tracks 3 and 9 previously released on Transfiguration of Hiram Brown (recorded December 21, 1959 – January 11, 1960):

- Mose Allison – piano, vocals
- Addison Farmer – bass
- Jerry Segal – drums

Tracks 5, 6, 11, and 12 previously released on I Love the Life I Live (recorded June 30, 1960):

- Mose Allison – piano, vocals
- Henry Grimes – bass
- Paul Motian – drums

Tracks 1, 2, 4, 7, 8, and 10 (recorded May 16, 1961):

- Mose Allison – piano, vocals
- Aaron Bell – bass
- Osie Johnson – drums
