= Ramblin' with Mose =

Studio album by Mose Allison
- Released: February 1962
- Recorded: April 18, 1958
- Studio: Van Gelder Studio, Hackensack, New Jersey
- Genre: Blues, jazz
- Label: Prestige; PRLP 7215
- Producer: Bob Weinstock

Mose Allison chronology
Young Man Mose (1958)	Ramblin' with Mose (1962)	Creek Bank (1958)

Ramblin' with Mose is the sixth album to be released (but fourth recorded) by blues/jazz pianist and vocalist Mose Allison which was recorded in 1958 and released on the Prestige label.

== Reception ==
Professional ratings
Review scores
Source	Rating
Allmusic	3/5 stars
The Penguin Guide to Jazz	4/4 stars

Thom Jurek of Allmusic states, "Allison displays absolutely brilliant instrumental prowess as both an arranger and as an improviser. His unique, often unorthodox interpretations of standards and pop songs set him apart from virtually every one of his peers". The Penguin Guide to Jazz described the recording as "curiously disarming".

== Track listing ==
All compositions by Mose Allison except as indicated

1. "I Got a Right to Cry" (Joe Liggins) – 2:48
2. "Old Devil Moon" (Burton Lane, Yip Harburg) – 5:08
3. "The Minstrels" – 3:27
4. "You Belong to Me" (Pee Wee King, Chilton Price, Redd Stewart) – 4:21
5. "Stranger in Paradise" (Robert Wright, George Forrest) – 5:26
6. "The Kissin' Bug" (Bill Eisenhauer, Diane Lampert, Horace Linsley) – 4:30
7. "Ramble" – 3:10
8. "Saritha" – 3:54
9. "Old Man John" – 2:17
10. "Ingenue" – 3:00
11. "Old Devil Moon" [Alternate Take] (Lane, Harburg) – 5:01 Bonus track on CD reissue
12. "Stranger in Paradise" [Alternate Take] (Wright, Forrest) – 5:49 Bonus track on CD reissue
13. "Ramble" [Alternate Take] – 3:24 Bonus track on CD reissue

== Personnel ==
- Mose Allison – piano, vocals
- Addison Farmer – bass
- Ronnie Free – drums
