= Ronnie Free =

American jazz drummer

- Birth name: Ronald Guy Free
- Born: January 15, 1936 (age 89)
- Origin: Charleston, South Carolina, U.S.
- Genres: Jazz
- Occupation(s): Musician, drummer
- Instrument: Drums
- Years active: 1950s–1990s

Ronnie Free (born Ronald Guy Free on January 15, 1936, in Charleston, South Carolina) is an American jazz drummer. His recording credits date back to the 1950s and he has collaborated with many notable jazz musicians including pianists Mose Allison, Oscar Pettiford, Sonny Clark, and bandleader Woody Herman.

The story of Ronnie Free's time in New York is told in an episode of NPR's The Jazz Loft Project. As a resident of the loft, Free functioned as the "house drummer" for many of the jam sessions that occurred there.

== Discography ==
With Mose Allison

- Ramblin' with Mose (Prestige, 1958)
- Creek Bank (Prestige, 1958)
- Autumn Song (Prestige, 1959)
- Mose Allison Sings (Prestige, 1963)
- Plays for Lovers (Prestige, 1966)
- Down Home Piano (Prestige, 1966)

With Lee Konitz and Jimmy Guiffre

- Lee Konitz Meets Jimmy Giuffre (Verve, 1959)
