= Tell Me Something: The Songs of Mose Allison =

Studio album by Van Morrison, Georgie Fame, Mose Allison, Ben Sidran
- Released: 8 October 1996
- Recorded: 1996
- Studio: The Wool Hall (Beckington, UK)
- Genre: Jazz
- Length: 36:48
- Label: Verve
- Producer: Van Morrison, Ben Sidran, Georgie Fame

Van Morrison chronology
How Long Has This Been Going On (1995)	Tell Me Something: The Songs of Mose Allison (1996)	The Healing Game (1997)

Mose Allison chronology
Allison Wonderland Anthology (1994)	Tell Me Something: The Songs of Mose Allison (1996)	Gimcracks and Gewgaws (1997)

Tell Me Something: The Songs of Mose Allison is a collaboration by Northern Irish singer-songwriter Van Morrison, Georgie Fame, Mose Allison and Ben Sidran, released in 1996. It is Van Morrison's 25th album. It charted at No. 1 on the Top Jazz Albums chart.

== Recording history ==
The entire recording for this album was done in a day and all of the performances were live first or second takes. Featuring the songs of Mose Allison, the performers were Allison himself, Georgie Fame, Ben Sidran, and Van Morrison, a longtime admirer of Allison's work. The horns were arranged by Pee Wee Ellis. Morrison said he had wanted to make the record for a long time. Liner notes are by Ben Sidran.

Ben Sidran had said this on working with Van Morrison in the studio for the album:

Heʼs exactly as he appears to be onstage. He never does anything the same way twice. Everything put down in the studio is done live, so whatever you play will likely end up on the finished record.

Professional ratings
Review scores
Source	Rating
Allmusic	link
All About Jazz	(not rated) link

== Track listing ==
All songs written by Mose Allison.

1. "One of These Days" – 3:18
2. "You Can Count on Me (To Do My Part)" – 3:22
3. "If You Live" – 3:47
4. "Was" – 3:28
5. "Look Here" – 2:09
6. "City Home" – 3:26
7. "No Trouble Livin'" – 2:15
8. "Benediction" – 3:01
9. "Back on the Corner" – 2:23
10. "Tell Me Something" – 2:40
11. "I Don't Want Much" – 2:03
12. "News Nightclub" – 2:43
13. "Perfect Moment" – 2:13

== Personnel ==
- Van Morrison – vocals, harmonica
- Georgie Fame – vocals, Hammond organ
- Ben Sidran – vocals, piano
- Mose Allison – vocals, piano on "I Don't Want Much" and "Perfect Moment"
- Alec Dankworth – bass
- Ralph Salmins – drums
- Guy Barker – trumpet
- Pee Wee Ellis – tenor saxophone
- Leo Green – tenor saxophone
- Robin Aspland – Wurlitzer piano

== Charts ==
Chart (1996)	Peak position
US Top Jazz Albums (Billboard)	1
