= Lee Konitz Meets Jimmy Giuffre =

Studio album by Lee Konitz and Jimmy Giuffre
- Released: 1959
- Recorded: May 12–13, 1959; New York City
- Genre: Jazz
- Label: Verve; MGV 8335

Jimmy Giuffre chronology
| Herb Ellis Meets Jimmy Giuffre (1959) | Lee Konitz Meets Jimmy Giuffre (1959) | The Easy Way (1959) |

Lee Konitz chronology
| Live at the Half Note (1959) | Lee Konitz Meets Jimmy Giuffre (1959) | You and Lee (1959) |

Lee Konitz Meets Jimmy Giuffre is an album by American jazz saxophonist Lee Konitz and saxophonist, composer and arranger Jimmy Giuffre, released on the Verve label in 1959.

== Critical reception ==
Professional ratings
Review scores
| Source | Rating |
|---|---|
| AllMusic | 4.5/5 stars |
| The Penguin Guide to Jazz Recordings | 3/4 stars |

Scott Yanow of AllMusic states that Giuffre's "arrangements for five saxes (including the great tenor Warne Marsh) and a trio led by pianist Bill Evans are sometimes equally influenced by classical music and bop".

== Track listing ==
1. "Palo Alto" (Lee Konitz) – 3:06
2. "Darn That Dream" (Jimmy Van Heusen, Eddie DeLange) – 1:53
3. "When Your Lover Has Gone" (Einar Aaron Swan) – 4:59
4. "Cork 'N Bib" (Konitz) – 9:42
5. "Somp'm Outa' Nothin'" (Jimmy Giuffre) – 4:20
6. "Someone to Watch over Me" (George Gershwin, Ira Gershwin) – 3:30
7. "Uncharted" (Giuffre) – 3:53
8. "Moonlight in Vermont" (Karl Suessdorf, John Blackburn) – 3:53
9. "The Song Is You" (Jerome Kern, Oscar Hammerstein II) – 5:01

== Personnel ==
- Lee Konitz – alto saxophone
- Jimmy Giuffre – baritone saxophone, arranger
- Hal McKusick – alto saxophone
- Ted Brown, Warne Marsh – tenor saxophone
- Bill Evans – piano
- Buddy Clark – bass
- Ronnie Free – drums
