= My Kinda Swing =

Studio album by Ernestine Anderson
- Released: November 1, 1961
- Recorded: Late 1960, New York City
- Genre: Vocal jazz
- Length: 37:24
- Label: Mercury

Ernestine Anderson chronology
The Toast of the Nation's Critics (1960)	My Kinda Swing (1961)	Hello Like Before (1977)

Professional ratings
Review scores
Source	Rating
Allmusic	3/5 stars
The Penguin Guide to Jazz Recordings	3/4 stars

My Kinda Swing is a 1961 studio album by Ernestine Anderson, arranged by Ernie Wilkins. This was the third and final album that Anderson recorded for Mercury Records, and the last album that she recorded for seventeen years.

== Track listing ==
1. "My Kinda Love" (Louis Alter, Jo Trent)
2. "Trouble is a Man" (Stanley Adams, Harold Adamson, eden ahbez)
3. "See See Rider" (Ma Rainey, Lena Arant)
4. "Moonlight in Vermont" (John Blackburn, Karl Suessdorf
5. "Land of Dreams"
6. "Black Moonlight"
7. "All My Life"
8. "Mound Bayou"
9. "I'll Never Be The Same" (Matty Malneck, Frank Signorelli, Gus Kahn)
10. "It Don't Mean a Thing (If It Ain't Got That Swing)" (Duke Ellington, Irving Mills)
11. "Lazy Afternoon"
12. "They Didn't Believe Me" (Jerome Kern, Herbert Reynolds)

== Personnel ==
- Ernestine Anderson – vocals
- Clark Terry – trumpet
- Hank Jones – piano
- Yusef Lateef – flute, saxophone, oboe
- Ernie Royal – trumpet
- Frank Rehak – trombone
- Kenny Burrell – guitar
- Tate Houston – baritone saxophone
- Mac Ceppos – violin
- Art Davis – double bass
- Willie Rodriguez – percussion
- Charlie Persip – drums
- Ernie Wilkins – arranger, conductor
