= Wild Man on the Loose =

Studio album by Mose Allison
- Released: 1965
- Recorded: January 26 & 28, 1965
- Studio: Atlantic Studios, New York City
- Genre: Jazz
- Length: 32:41
- Label: Atlantic
- Producer: Nesuhi Ertegun and Arif Mardin

Mose Allison chronology
The Word from Mose (1964)	Wild Man on the Loose (1965)	Mose Alive! (1965)

Wild Man on the Loose is an album by Mose Allison, recorded for the Atlantic label in 1965.

== Reception ==
Professional ratings
Review scores
Source	Rating
AllMusic	3/5 stars
The Encyclopedia of Popular Music	3/5 stars

AllMusic awarded the album 3 stars with its review by Eugene Chadbourne stating, "The lion's share of recordings by this artist are in a piano trio setting, and this mid-'60s session finds him working with one of the best combinations he ever had. ...Vocal performances are smooth as always, although the set does not contain any totally classic numbers".

== Track listing ==
All compositions by Mose Allison except as indicated

1. "Wild Man on the Loose" – 2:06
2. "No Trouble Livin'" – 2:17
3. "Night Watch" – 4:34
4. "What's with You" – 2:55
5. "Power House" – 5:00
6. "You Can Count on Me to Do My Part" – 2:11
7. "Never More" – 4:27
8. "That's the Stuff You Gotta Watch" (Buddy Johnson) – 2:12
9. "War Horse" – 6:59

== Personnel ==
- Mose Allison – piano, vocals
- Earl May – bass
- Paul Motian – drums
