= Your Mind Is on Vacation =

Studio album by Mose Allison
- Released: 1976
- Recorded: April 5, 7, 8 & 9, 1976
- Studios: Atlantic Recording Studios and Regent Sound Studio, New York City
- Genre: Jazz
- Length: 36:47
- Label: Atlantic
- Producer: Joel Dorn

Mose Allison chronology
Mose in Your Ear (1972)	Your Mind Is on Vacation (1976)	Pure Mose (1978)

Your Mind Is on Vacation is an album by American pianist, vocalist and composer Mose Allison recorded for the Atlantic label in 1976. The album cover was designed by Seymour Chwast.

== Reception ==
Professional ratings
Review scores
Source	Rating
AllMusic	4.5/5 stars

Allmusic awarded the album 4½ stars and its review by Scotty Yanow states, "It seems strange to realize that this was Mose Allison's only recording during the 1973–1981 period".

== Track listing ==
All compositions by Mose Allison except as indicated

1. "Your Mind Is on Vacation" – 2:34
2. "Foolin' Myself" (Jack Lawrence, Peter Tinturin) – 2:52
3. "No Matter" – 3:40
4. "One of These Days" – 4:29
5. "I Feel So Good" – 2:25
6. "Fires of Spring" – 2:57
7. "If You Only Knew" – 2:42
8. "I Can't See for Lookin'" (Arnold Stanford, Nadine Robinson) – 3:57
9. "What Do You Do After You Ruin Your Life" – 3:23
10. "Swingin' Machine" – 4:08
11. "Perfect Moment" – 3:30
12. "Your Molecular Structure" – 2:16

== Personnel ==
- Mose Allison – piano, vocals
- Jack Hannah – bass
- Jerry Granelli – drums
- Al Porcino – trumpet (tracks 1, 4, 6, 7 & 12)
- David Sanborn – alto saxophone (tracks 1, 4, 6, 7 & 12)
- Al Cohn (tracks 2 & 8), Joe Farrell (tracks 1, 4, 6, 7 & 12) – tenor saxophone
