= I Don't Worry About a Thing =

Studio album by Mose Allison
- Released: 1962
- Recorded: March 15, 1962
- Studio: Atlantic Studios, New York City
- Genre: Jazz
- Length: 33:36
- Label: Atlantic
- Producer: Nesuhi Ertegun

Mose Allison chronology
Takes to the Hills (1962)	I Don't Worry About a Thing (1962)	Swingin' Machine (1963)

I Don't Worry About a Thing is an album by American pianist, vocalist and composer Mose Allison recorded for the Atlantic label in 1962.

== Reception ==
Professional ratings
Review scores
Source	Rating
AllMusic	4/5 stars
The Penguin Guide to Jazz	4/4 stars

Allmusic awarded the album 4 stars with its review by Scott Yanow stating, "this was his breakthrough date. One of jazz's greatest lyricists, at the time, Allison was making the transition from being a pianist who occasionally sang to becoming a vocalist who also played his own unusual brand of piano. ...the set is one of Mose Allison's most significant recordings". The Penguin Guide to Jazz commented that, with its combination of material, "for some this is the classic Mose album".

== Track listing ==
All compositions by Mose Allison except as indicated

1. "I Don't Worry About a Thing" – 2:17
2. "It Didn't Turn Out That Way" – 2:41
3. "Your Mind Is on Vacation" – 2:35
4. "Let Me See" (Count Basie, Harry Edison) – 4:08
5. "Everything I Have Is Yours" (Burton Lane, Harold Adamson) – 4:07
6. "Stand By" – 4:56
7. "Idyll" – 4:15
8. "The Well" – 3:30
9. "Meet Me at No Special Place" (J. Russel Robinson, Arthur Terker, Harry Pyle) – 2:33
10. "The Song Is Ended" (Irving Berlin) – 2:34

== Personnel ==
- Mose Allison – piano, vocals
- Addison Farmer – bass
- Osie Johnson – drums
