= The Way of the World (album) =

Studio album by Mose Allison
- Released: 2010
- Recorded: July 27, 2009 – July 31, 2009
- Studios: The Garfield House (South Pasadena, CA)
- Genre: Blues / Jazz
- Length: 35:08
- Label: ANTI-
- Producer: Joe Henry

Mose Allison chronology
The Mose Chronicles: Live in London, vol. 2 (2002)	The Way of the World (2010)	Mose Allison American Legend Live in California (2015)

The Way of the World is an album by American jazz/blues singer Mose Allison, released in 2010 on ANTI-. It was his first studio album since 1997's Gimcracks and Gewgaws. He decided to record the album after producer Joe Henry approached him in 2008 and persuaded him to come out of retirement.

== Critical reception ==
According to Metacritic, The Way of the World has a score of 78 out of 100, indicating that it has received "generally favorable reviews" from critics.

Professional ratings
Aggregate scores
Source	Rating
Metacritic	78/100
Review scores
Source	Rating
AllMusic	4/5 stars
Robert Christgau	B+
The Daily Telegraph	4/5 stars
PopMatters	9/10 stars

== Track listing ==
All compositions by Mose Allison except as indicated.

1. "My Brain" – 2:59
2. "I Know You Didn't Mean It" – 3:28
3. "Everybody Thinks You're an Angel" (Amy Allison) – 2:58
4. "Let It Come Down" – 2:31
5. "Modest Proposal" – 2:29
6. "Crush" – 2:55
7. "Some Right, Some Wrong" (Roosevelt Sykes) – 2:48
8. "The Way of the World" (Mose Allison, Joe Henry) – 2:50
9. "Ask Me Nice" – 3:19
10. "Once in a While" (Michael Edwards/Bud Green) – 3:32
11. "I'm Alright" (Loudon Wainwright III) – 3:11
12. "This New Situation" (Buddy Johnson) – 2:08

== Personnel ==
- Mose Allison – piano, vocals
- Amy Allison – vocals on 12
- Jay Bellerose – drums, percussion
- Greg Leisz – acoustic guitar, electric guitar, Weissenborn, and mandola
- David Piltch – upright bass
- Walter Smith III – tenor saxophone
- Anthony Wilson – electric guitar
