= Just a Little Lovin' (Carmen McRae album) =

Studio album by Carmen McRae
- Released: 1970
- Recorded: February 16, 1970 & May 18, 1970
- Studio: Atlantic South-Criteria Studio, Miami, FL & Atlantic Studios, New York City
- Genre: Jazz, Pop
- Length: 35:26
- Label: Atlantic
- Producer: Arif Mardin

Carmen McRae chronology
Portrait of Carmen (1968)	Just a Little Lovin' (1970)	The Great American Songbook (1972)

Professional ratings
Review scores
Source	Rating
Allmusic	3.5/5 stars

Just a Little Lovin' is a 1970 studio album by Carmen McRae, directed and produced by Arif Mardin. The recording in a studio of Atlantic Records in Miami was set up with a horn section, an occasional string section and The Sweet Inspirations as backing vocals on some tracks. The studio's own Dixie Flyers, a rhythm section founded by Sammy Creason, provided the contemporary electrified sound for a repertoire that derived mainly from only recently written pop songs, three alone by the Beatles, two by the Muscle Shoal crew like "Breakfast in Bed", written in 1968 for Dusty Springfield, and a Laura Nyro original. The electrified orchestral sound is advanced twice, on "Something" with the use of a cimbalom (remotely similar sounding like a sitar), and with a Mellotron on "What'cha Gonna Do" that harmonizes with the strings. Slightly out of the pop vein are a straightforwardly played blues shuffle, "I Love the Life I Live" by Willie Dixon, and "Didn't We", an intimate duet with guitarist Al Gafa. There were several singles issued before and alongside the album's release, although the songs chosen for the most part didn't make it on the final album. They were reissued in 1991 as additional tracks on a Japanese digital re-release. "I Love You More Than You'll Ever Know" and "Just a Dream" were recorded already in September 1969 and Mardin had not thought of a horn section yet, instead the strings are emphasized.

== Track listing ==
1. "Just a Little Lovin'" (Barry Mann, Cynthia Weil) – 2:15
2. "Something" (George Harrison) – 3:07
3. "I Thought I Knew You Well" (Tony Joe White) – 3:42
4. "I Want You" (Tony Joe White) – 2:10
5. "More Today Than Yesterday" (Patrick Upton) – 2:59
6. "Here, There and Everywhere" (John Lennon, Paul McCartney) – 2:32
7. "Carry That Weight" (Lennon, McCartney) – 2:45
8. "Breakfast in Bed" (Donnie Fritts, Eddie Hinton) – 3:12
9. "I Love the Life I Live" (Willie Dixon) – 2:25
10. "What'cha Gonna Do" (Donnie Fritts, John Reid) – 3:35
11. "Didn't We" (Jim Webb) – 3:22
12. "Goodbye Joe" (Laura Nyro) – 2:30

Bonus tracks on 1991 Japan CD release

"I Love You More Than You'll Ever Know" (Al Kooper) – 3:37
1. "Just a Dream" (Bobby Worth) – 3:16
2. "Silent Spring" (Allan Paul Shatkin) – 3:05

All tracks were recorded February 2, 1970, at Atlantic South-Criteria Studio in Miami, Florida, except "Didn't We" recorded May 18, 1970, at Atlantic Studios in New York. The single tracks "I Love You More Than You'll Ever Know" and "Just a Dream" were recorded September 15, 1969, at Regent Sound Studio, NY, and "Silent Spring" in March 1970 at Atlantic Studios in New York.

== Personnel ==
- Carmen McRae – vocals
- Arif Mardin – arranger, musical director
- Horn section (on all tracks except 11, 13–15)
  - King Curtis – alto saxophone, tenor saxophone (soloist)
  - George Dorsey – alto saxophone
  - Pepper Adams – baritone saxophone
  - Joe Newman – trumpet (soloist)
  - Garnett Brown – trombone
  - Wally Kane, George Marge, Romeo Penque – woodwind
  - Joseph DeAngelis, Anthony Miranda, Brooks Tillotson – French horn
- The Dixie Flyers:
  - Mike Utley – electric piano, organ
  - Jim Dickinson – guitar, keyboards
  - Charlie Freeman – lead guitar
  - Tommy McClure – bass
  - Sammy Creason – drums, percussion
- The Sweet Inspirations – backing vocals (2, 3, 7, 12, 13)
- Unknown string section conducted by Gene Orloff (1, 2, 7, 10, 13–15)

"Didn't We" is a duo with

- Al Gafa – guitar
