= Autumn Song (Mose Allison album) =

Studio album by Mose Allison
- Released: 1959
- Recorded: February 13, 1959
- Studio: Van Gelder Studio, Hackensack, New Jersey
- Genre: Blues/Jazz
- Length: 34:27
- Label: Prestige; PRLP 7189
- Producer: Bob Weinstock

Mose Allison chronology
Creek Bank (1958)	Autumn Song (1959)	Transfiguration of Hiram Brown (1959)

Autumn Song is the fifth album released by blues/jazz pianist and vocalist Mose Allison which was recorded in 1959 and released on the Prestige label.

== Reception ==
Professional ratings
Review scores
Source	Rating
Allmusic	4/5 stars
The Penguin Guide to Jazz	3.5/4 stars

Scott Yanow of Allmusic states, "One realizes why Allison was soon emphasizing his vocals; he was a much more distinctive singer than pianist although his piano playing was actually pretty inventive. This is an excellent all-round set". The Penguin Guide to Jazz wrote that the album was "nicely balanced between vocal set-pieces [...] and his serious stuff".

== Track listing ==
All compositions by Mose Allison except where noted.

1. "Promenade" – 4:09
2. "Eyesight to the Blind" (Sonny Boy Williamson II) – 1:41
3. "It's Crazy" (Dorothy Fields, Richard Rodgers) – 3:37
4. "That's All Right", (Jimmy Rogers) – 2:27
5. "Devil in the Cane Field" – 4:02
6. "Strange" (Matthew Fisher, John La Touche) – 3:06
7. "Autumn Song" – 3:40
8. "Do Nothin' Till You Hear from Me" (Duke Ellington, Bob Russell) – 3:11
9. "Spires" – 3:03
10. "Groovin' High" (Dizzy Gillespie) – 5:39

== Personnel ==
- Mose Allison – piano, vocals
- Addison Farmer – bass
- Ronnie Free – drums
