= Allison Wonderland Anthology =

Allison Wonderland: The Mose Allison Anthology

Compilation album by Mose Allison
- Released: 1994
- Recorded: 1952–1989
- Length: 137:25
- Label: Rhino

Mose Allison chronology
The Earth Wants You [live] (1993)	Allison Wonderland: The Mose Allison Anthology (1994)	Tell Me Something: The Songs of Mose Allison (1996)

Professional ratings
Review scores
Source	Rating
AllMusic	5/5 stars

Allison Wonderland: The Mose Allison Anthology is a two disc compilation album by the jazz pianist and songwriter Mose Allison, released in 1994. Rhino sequenced the selected songs (which span over 40 years, from 1957 to 1989), and include all of his best-known songs chronologically.

== Track listing ==
=== Disc One ===
1. "Back Country Suite: Blues [A.K.A. 'Young Man's Blues']" (Mose Allison)
2. "Lost Mind"
3. "Parchman Farm" (Mose Allison)
4. "If You Live" (Mose Allison)
5. "The Seventh Son" (Willie Dixon)
6. "Eyesight to the Blind"
7. "Baby, Please Don't Go"
8. "Fool's Paradise"
9. "V-8 Ford Blues"
10. "Ask Me Nice" (Mose Allison)
11. "Hey, Good Lookin'"
12. "Back on the Corner" (Mose Allison)
13. "Your Mind Is on Vacation" (Mose Allison, Audre Mae)
14. "Meet Me at No Special Place"
15. "I Don't Worry About a Thing" (Mose Allison)
16. "I Ain't Got Nothing but the Blues"
17. "Swingin' Machine" (Mose Allison)
18. "Stop This World" (Mose Allison)
19. "I'm Not Talking" (Mose Allison)
20. "I'm the Wild Man" (Stanley Willis, Don Barksdale)
21. "Your Red Wagon"
22. "Fool Killer" (Mose Allison)
23. "Wild Man on the Loose" (Mose Allison)
24. "You Can Count on Me to Do My Part" (Mose Allison)
25. "Smashed" Live (Mose Allison)
26. "I Love the Life I Live, I Live the Life I Love" Live
27. "That's All Right" Live
28. "Fool's Paradise" Live

=== Disc Two ===
1. "If You're Goin' to the City" (Mose Allison)
2. "Everybody's Cryin' Mercy" (Mose Allison)
3. "Feel So Good" (Mose Allison)
4. "Molecular Structure" (Mose Allison)
5. "Monsters of the Id" (Mose Allison)
6. "Hello There, Universe" (Mose Allison)
7. "I Don't Want Much" (Mose Allison)
8. "How Much Truth" (Mose Allison)
9. "Western Man" (Mose Allison)
10. "I'm Just a Lucky So-and-So" (Duke Ellington, lyrics-Mack David)
11. "Tennessee Waltz"
12. "Ever Since the World Ended" (Mose Allison)
13. "Top Forty" (Mose Allison)
14. "Josephine"
15. "Gettin' There" (Mose Allison)
16. "Ever Since I Stole the Blues" (Mose Allison)
17. "You Call It Joggin'"
18. "Big Brother" (Mose Allison)
19. "The Gettin' Paid Waltz" (Mose Allison)
