= Mojo Triangle =

The Mojo Triangle, a geographical and cultural area located within a triangular connection between New Orleans, Nashville and Memphis, is the birthplace of country, blues, jazz, and rock and roll. The Mojo Triangle has creative artists, not just in music, but also in literature and films.

== Origins of the Mojo Triangle ==
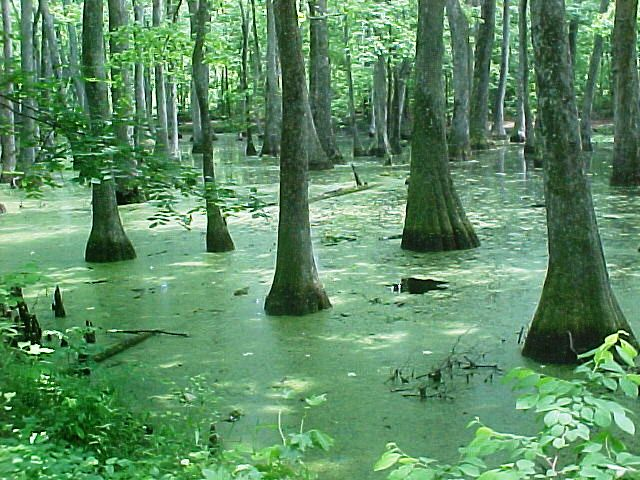
Blues, rock 'n' roll, jazz and country—all potent brews of the swamp. This alligator-bearing cypress swamp bumps against the Natchez Trace just outside Jackson, Mississippi, in the heart of Mojoland.

The phrase "Mojo Triangle" was first coined by author James L. Dickerson in his award-winning 2005 book, Mojo Triangle: Birthplace of Country, Blues, Jazz and Rock 'n' Roll.

A fiddle tune named "Natchez Under the Hill", which originated in the joints along the docks in Natchez, was one of the first original songs ever published in America, according to Dickerson. Published in 1834, it was re-titled "Old Zip Coon", only to later morph into "Turkey in the Straw". With that song began a tradition that inspired the creation of a musical dynasty.

Natchez remained a musical cauldron throughout the 1800s, blending traditional folk music from Europe with the exotic rhythms and harmonies of the Choctaw and Chickasaw, and the unique phrasing vocalized by slaves from Africa. But it was not until the late 1920s, when Jimmie Rodgers began recording what would later be recognized as America's first country music that the first blend of European/Native American/African music took hold.

Ten years later, Robert Johnson took the music recorded by Rodgers and moved it a step further by recording what we today call blues music. Both Rodgers and Johnson owe an enormous debt to the Choctaw. "Both use 6/4, 5/4, and 4/4 time signatures, and both use short 6/4 introductions that quickly change to 5/4 or 4/4 after one or two bars. For example Johnson's 'Little Queen of Spades' has a one bar introduction in 6/4 that changes to 4/4, an identical time signature to the Choctaw's 'Wedding Dance,' which also goes 6/4 to 4/4."

Musicians in New Orleans incorporated the music of Natchez and added Caribbean influences to produce jazz, a free-flowing instrumental interpretation of the same influences that birthed blues and country. In the mid-1950s, Elvis Presley, Scotty Moore and Bill Black took the work of Rodgers and Johnson and gave shape to rock and roll, creating an unbroken circle of creativity that continues to this day.

== Talent from the Mojo Triangle ==
=== Music ===
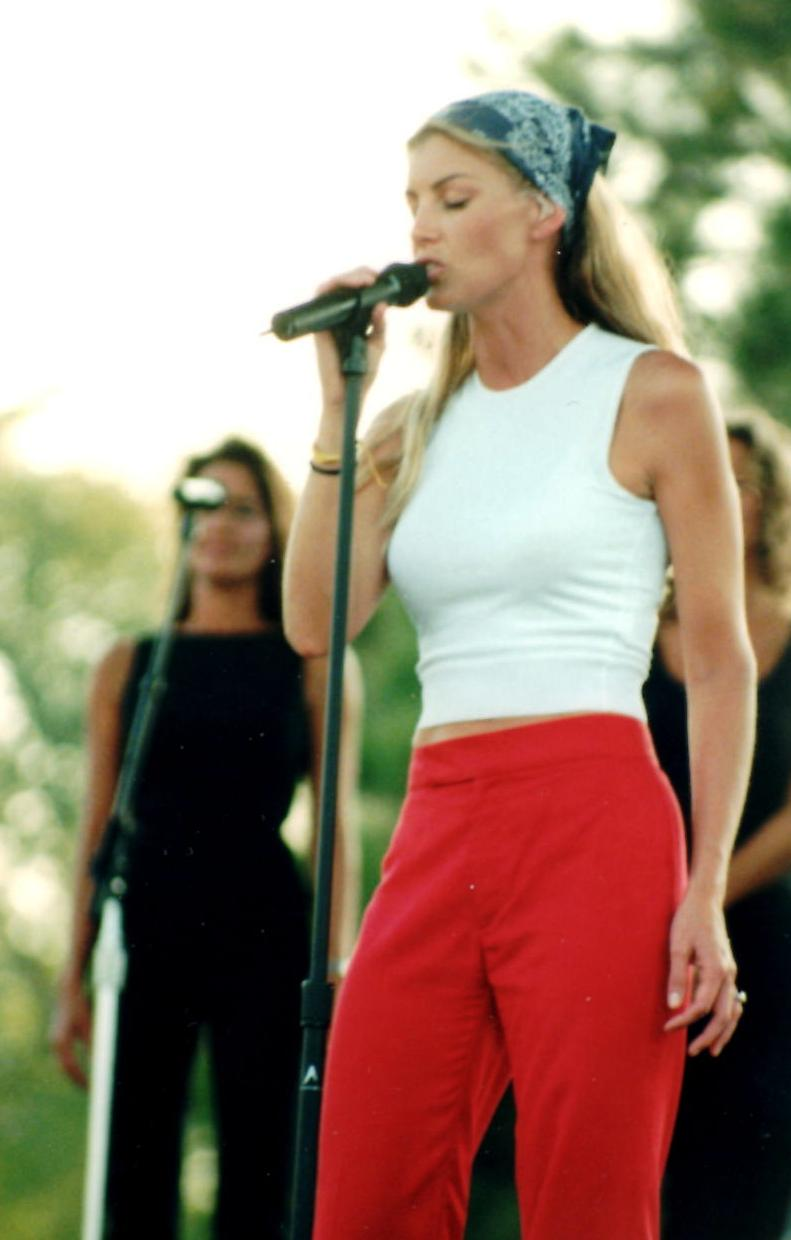
Faith Hill performing in Jackson, Mississippi

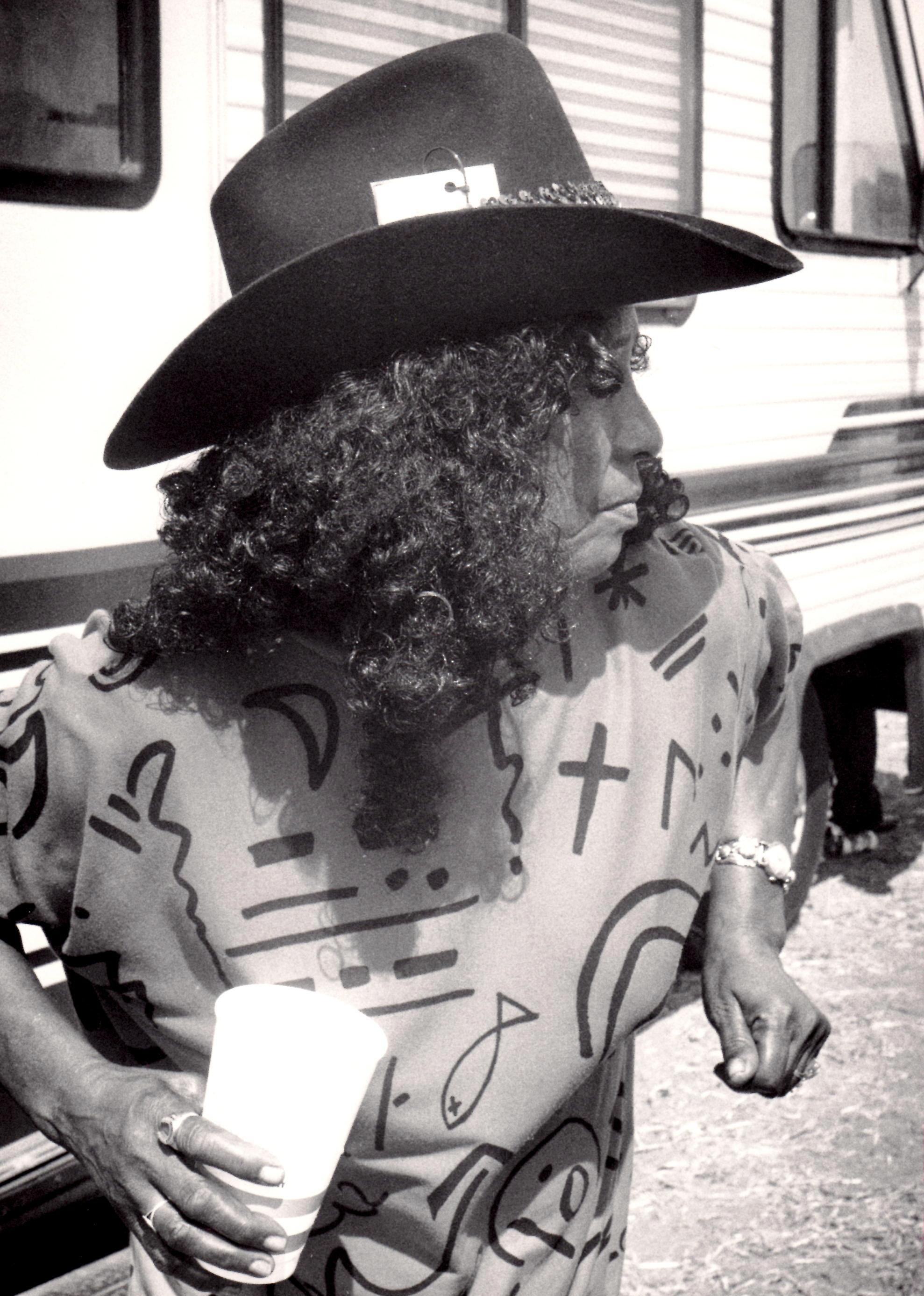
Jessie Mae Hemphill backstage at a blues concert

Deborah Allen, Mose Allison, Lisa Angelle, Lil Hardin Armstrong (1898–1971), Louis Armstrong (1901–1971), Estelle Axton (1918–2004), Booker T. & the M.G.'s (Booker T. Jones, Steve Cropper, Donald "Duck" Dunn, Al Jackson), Lance Bass, Jimmy Buffett, Ace Cannon, Joe Frank Carollo, Johnny Cash (1932–2003), Sam Chatmon, Alex Chilton (1950–2010), Jack "Cowboy" Clement, Sam Cooke (1931–1964), Rita Coolidge, Harry Connick, Jr., Tommy Couch, Miley Cyrus, Del Rays (Jimmy Johnson, Norbert Putnam, Jimmy Ray Hunter and Roger Hawkins), Rick Dees, Jim Dickinson (1941–2009), Bo Diddley, Willie Dixon (1915–1992), Fats Domino, Dr. John, 827 Thomas Street Band (Bobby Emmons, Reggie Young, Bobby Wood, Mike Leech, and Gene Chrisman), and Sleepy John Estes.

Fred Ford, Aretha Franklin, John Fry, The Gants (Sid Herring, Don Wood, Vince Montgomery, and Johnny Freeman), Rambling Steve Gardner, Bobbie Gentry, The Gentrys, Buddy Guy, Rick Hall, W. C. Handy (1873-1958), Jessie Mae Hemphill, Faith Hill, Al Hirt, David Hood, John Lee Hooker (1917–2001), Jimi Jamison, Jimmy Johnson, Robert Johnson, Albert King, B.B. King, Jimmie Lunceford (1902–1947), Bobby Manuel, The Mar-Keys, Branford Marsalis, Wynton Marsalis, Mac McAnally, Memphis Minnie, Mississippi Sheiks (Armenter Chatmon, Sam Chatmon, Lonnie Chatmon, and Walter Vinson), Willie Mitchell (1928–2010), Chips Moman, Brandy Norwood.

Dolly Parton, Charlie Patton (1891?-1934), Pinetop Perkins (1913–2011), Sam Phillips, Elvis Presley, Charley Pride, Jimmy Reed, Road Runners (Terry Dunn, Jimmie Dunn, Tom Smith, Curt Ayers, James L. Dickerson), LeAnn Rimes, Jimmie Rodgers, Percy Sledge, Jim Stewart, Britney Spears, Pops Staples (1914–2000), Ole Miss Strokers (Jay Sheffield, Bunker Ex Hill, Bill Lemmon, Mike Daniel, James L. Dickerson), Marty Stuart, Greg "Fingers" Taylor, Carla Thomas, Irma Thomas, Rufus Thomas, Justin Timberlake, Allen Toussaint, Ike Turner (1931–2007), Muddy Waters, Jim Weatherly, Tim Whitsett and The Imperials, Sonny Boy Williamson, Howlin' Wolf, and Tammy Wynette.

=== Film ===
Dana Andrews (1909–1992), Shannen Doherty, John Dye, Morgan Freeman, James Earl Jones, Diane Ladd, Dorothy Lamour, John Larroquette, Gerald McRaney, Parker Posey, Annie Potts, Cybill Shepherd, Stella Stevens, Fred Thompson, Ray Walston (1914–2001), Sela Ward, Carl Weathers, Oprah Winfrey, and Reese Witherspoon.

=== Literature ===
Stephen E. Ambrose (1936–2002), Ace Atkins, Howard Bahr, John M. Barry, Larry Brown (1951–2004), Jimmy Buffett, Will D. Campbell, Hodding Carter (1907–1972), Hodding Carter III, Turner Catledge, Ellen Douglas, John Faulkner (1901–1963), William Faulkner (1897–1962), William R. Ferris, Richard Ford, Shelby Foote (1916–2005), John Grisham, Barry Hannah (1942–2010), Beth Henley, Greg Iles, Willie Morris (1934–1999), Lewis Nordan, Walker Percy (1916-1990), William Alexander Percy (1885-1942), Anne Rice, Elizabeth Spencer, Kathryn Stockett, Margaret Walker (1915–1998), Eudora Welty (1909-2001), Curtis Wilkie, Tennessee Williams (1911-1983), Richard Wright (1908-1960), Steve Yarbrough, and Stark Young (1881-1963).

== Writers who have explored the Mojo Triangle ==
James L. Dickerson, a native of the Mississippi Delta, is the author of twenty-nine books. He has worked as a magazine editor and publisher, newspaper editor, reporter, columnist, book critic, and social worker. His book, Mojo Triangle, was the winner of a 2006 IPPY award (Independent Publisher Book Awards) in the non-fiction category. Two other books, Goin' Back to Memphis: A Century of Blues, Rock 'n' Roll and Glorious Soul and That's Alright, Elvis, were finalists for the Gleason Award, given out annually by Rolling Stone magazine, BMI, and New York University. In the mid-to-late 1980s, Dickerson was the publisher/editor of Nine-O-One Network Magazine, the first magazine located in the Mojo Triangle to obtain newsstand circulation in all 50 states. He co-owned and produced a radio syndication, Pulsebeat—Voice of the Heartland, which focused on the music produced in the Mojo Triangle.

Other music historians who have written about musicians from the Mojo Triangle are Stanley Booth (The True Adventures of the Rolling Stones, Rhythm Oil, and Furry's Blues); Peter Guralnick (Sweet Soul Music) and Robert Palmer (Deep Blues). None of those writers were born in the Triangle, but all wrote extensively on the blues. Palmer, who died in 1997, was a music writer for The New York Times and spent the last years of his life living in the Mojo Triangle. Booth, who lives in Georgia, has contributed to Rolling Stone, Playboy, and Esquire. Guralnick is probably best known for his two-volume biography of Elvis Presley.

== Places to experience the Mojo Triangle ==
- Graceland
- Memphis in May (May)
- Tupelo Elvis Festival (June)
- W. C. Handy Music Festival (July)
- Southern Festival of Books (October)
- Crossroads Film Festival (March)
- The Natchez Trace, a 440-mile federal parkway that connects Natchez and Nashville
- Beale Street Music Festival (Memphis)
- Jazz & Heritage Festival (New Orleans)
- French Quarter Festival (New Orleans)
- Essence Music Festival (New Orleans)
