= Mose in Your Ear =

Live album by Mose Allison
- Released: 1972
- Recorded: April 26, 1972
- Venue: In Your Ear, Palo Alto
- Genre: Jazz
- Length: 38:47
- Label: Atlantic
- Producer: Mose Allison

Mose Allison chronology
Western Man (1971)	Mose in Your Ear (1972)	Your Mind Is on Vacation (1976)

Mose in Your Ear is a live album by American pianist, vocalist and composer Mose Allison recorded at the "In Your Ear" club in Palo Alto, California for the Atlantic label in 1972.

== Reception ==
Professional ratings
Review scores
Source	Rating
AllMusic	4/5 stars
The Penguin Guide to Jazz Recordings	3/4 stars

Allmusic awarded the album 4 stars with its review by Scott Yanow calling it a "near-classic set" and stating "This live session from 1972 features Mose Allison at his best".

== Track listing ==
All compositions by Mose Allison except as indicated

1. "Look What You Made Me Do" – 3:28
2. "Fool's Paradise" (Jerry Fuller, Mabel Cordle) – 4:56
3. "I Don't Worry About a Thing" – 2:41
4. "Powerhouse" – 8:41
5. "Hey, Good Lookin'" (Hank Williams) – 1:56
6. "I Ain't Got Nothin' But the Blues" (Duke Ellington, Don George) – 4:26
7. "You Can Count on Me to Do My Part" – 2:33
8. "You Are My Sunshine" (Jimmie Davis, Charles Mitchell) – 3:09
9. "Don't Forget to Smile" – 2:35
10. "The Seventh Son" (Willie Dixon) – 4:22

== Personnel ==
- Mose Allison – piano, vocals
- Clyde Flowers – bass
- Eddie Charlton – drums
