= Western Man =

Studio album by Mose Allison
- Released: 1971
- Recorded: February 2, 3 & 11 and March 3 & 4, 1971
- Studios: Atlantic Studios and Regent Sound Studio, New York City
- Genre: Jazz
- Length: 36:47
- Label: Atlantic
- Producer: Joel Dorn

Mose Allison chronology
Hello There, Universe (1970)	Western Man (1971)	Mose in Your Ear (1972)

Western Man is an album by American pianist, vocalist and composer Mose Allison recorded for the Atlantic label in 1971.

== Reception ==
Professional ratings
Review scores
Source	Rating
AllMusic	3/5 stars
The Penguin Guide to Jazz	3/4 stars

Allmusic awarded the album 3 stars stating, "Allison's wry wit is in fine form, and his ironic yet truthful lyrics are always fun to hear". The Penguin Guide to Jazz commented on the distant studio sound quality and the strange choice of drummer.

== Track listing ==
All compositions by Mose Allison except as indicated

1. "If You Only Knew" – 2:40
2. "How Much Truth" – 3:36
3. "Benediction" – 2:00
4. "Night Club" – 2:36
5. "Do Nothing till You Hear from Me" (Duke Ellington, Bob Russell) – 3:13
6. "Mountains" – 5:25
7. "Western Man" – 3:14
8. "Ask Me Nice" – 3:15
9. "Tell Me Something" – 3:43
10. "If You've Got the Money I've Got the Time" (Jim Beck, Lefty Frizzell) – 3:15
11. "Meadows" – 3:50

== Personnel ==
- Mose Allison – piano, electric piano, vocals
- Chuck Rainey – electric bass
- Billy Cobham – drums
