= Swingin' Machine =

Studio album by Mose Allison
- Released: 1963
- Recorded: November 8 & 9, 1962
- Studio: Atlantic Studios, New York City
- Genre: Jazz
- Length: 33:23
- Label: Atlantic
- Producer: Nesuhi Ertegun

Mose Allison chronology
I Don't Worry About a Thing (1962)	Swingin' Machine (1963)	The Word from Mose (1964)

Swingin' Machine is an album by American pianist, vocalist and composer Mose Allison recorded for the Atlantic label in 1962.

== Reception ==
Professional ratings
Review scores
Source	Rating
AllMusic	2.5/5 stars

Allmusic awarded the album 2 1/2 stars with its review by Eugene Chadbourne stating, "adding horns to Allison's band just doesn't work that well. ...All the vocal tracks here are fine... In all, an enjoyable album but a bit disappointing".

== Track listing ==
All compositions by Mose Allison except as indicated

1. "Swingin' Machine" – 2:31
2. "Do It" – 4:33
3. "Stop This World" – 3:24
4. "Promenade" – 5:10
5. "If You're Goin' to the City" – 3:49
6. "Saritha" – 4:58
7. "I Ain't Got Nothin' but the Blues" (Duke Ellington, Don George) – 3:56
8. "So Rare" (Jerry Herst, Jack Sharpe) – 5:02
- Recorded at Atlantic Studios in NYC on November 8 (tracks 2, 4, 5 & 7) and November 9 (tracks 1, 3, 6 & 8), 1962

== Personnel ==
- Mose Allison – piano, vocals
- Jimmy Knepper – trombone
- Jim Reider – tenor saxophone
- Addison Farmer – bass
- Frankie Dunlop – drums
