= Local Color (Mose Allison album) =

Studio album by Mose Allison
- Released: 1958
- Recorded: November 8, 1957
- Studio: Van Gelder Studio, Hackensack, New Jersey
- Genre: Blues, jazz
- Length: 35:36
- Label: Prestige; PRLP 7121
- Producer: Bob Weinstock

Mose Allison chronology
Back Country Suite (1957)	Local Color (1958)	Young Man Mose (1958)

Local Color is the second album by blues/jazz pianist and vocalist Mose Allison which was recorded in 1957 and released on the Prestige label. The album features the first recording of Allison's "Parchman Farm" which was later covered by John Mayall & the Bluesbreakers on their album Blues Breakers with Eric Clapton.

== Reception ==
Professional ratings
Review scores
Source	Rating
Allmusic	3/5 stars
The Penguin Guide to Jazz	3/4 stars

Scott Yanow, in his review for Allmusic, says "Allison performs eight instrumentals in a trio... displaying his unusual mixture of country blues and bebop... However it is his vocals on "Lost Mind" and particularly the classic "Parchman Farm" that are most memorable". The Penguin Guide to Jazz praised the rendition of "Lost Mind" and highlighted a rare instance of Allison playing trumpet, on "Trouble in Mind".

== Track listing ==
All compositions by Mose Allison except as indicated

1. "Carnival" – 2:59
2. "Parchman Farm" – 3:17
3. "Crepuscular Air" – 3:43
4. "Mojo Woman" – 4:04
5. "Town" – 3:21
6. "Trouble in Mind" (Richard M. Jones) – 3:13
7. "Lost Mind" (Percy Mayfield) – 3:31
8. "I'll Never Be Free" (Bennie Benjamin, George Weiss) – 5:36
9. "Don't Ever Say Goodbye" (Duke Ellington) – 3:12
10. "Ain't You a Mess" – 2:40

== Personnel ==
- Mose Allison – piano, trumpet on 6, vocals
- Addison Farmer – bass
- Nick Stabulas – drums
