= Parchman Farm (song) =

Song first recorded by Bukka White in 1940

"Parchman Farm Blues"

Single by Bukka White
- B-side: "District Attorney Blues"
- Released: 1940
- Recorded: Chicago, March 7, 1940
- Genre: Blues
- Length: 2:38
- Label: Okeh
- Songwriter: Bukka White
- Producer: Lester Melrose

"Parchman Farm" or "Parchman Farm Blues" is a blues song first recorded by American Delta blues musician Bukka White in 1940. It is an autobiographical piece, in which White sings of his experience at the infamous Mississippi State Penitentiary, otherwise known as Parchman Farm.

Jazz pianist-vocalist Mose Allison adapted it for his own "Parchman Farm" and "New Parchman", which are among his most popular songs. Numerous artists have recorded their own renditions, usually based on Allison's songs.

== Background ==
Early in his recording career in 1937, Bukka White was arrested and convicted for a shooting incident and was sentenced to Parchman Farm prison in rural Sunflower County, Mississippi. The institution was operated as a hard-time prison labor work farm, which was notorious for its harsh conditions and use of the trusty system. His recording of "Shake 'Em On Down" became a hit while he was there and as a result, White became somewhat of a celebrity at the prison. While incarcerated, he recorded two songs for John Lomax, who was conducting field recordings for the Archive of Folk Culture at the U.S. Library of Congress. After White was released two years later in 1939 (the circumstances of his early release have been questioned), he resumed his recording career with producer Lester Melrose in Chicago.

== Lyrics and style ==
In March 1940, White arrived at the recording studio prepared to record with several songs. When Melrose saw that they were mostly reworkings of current popular blues numbers, he encouraged White to take a couple of days and prepare some new material. White later recalled, "I got down to it" and returned on March 7 with twelve new songs. One was "Parchman Farm Blues", which he recorded that day (all twelve were recorded over two days, May 7 and 8, 1940). The song has the elements of Delta blues, including a one-chord modal arrangement and a slide guitar break. However, the melody line is distinctive and relies less on blue notes. White delivers the vocal in his characteristic grainy, guttural style accompanied by his acoustic guitar, with Washboard Sam on washboard percussion. His lyrics allude to his time at Parchman:

Oh listen you men, I don't mean no harm (2×)
If you wanna do good, you better stay off ol' Parchman farm
We got to work in the mornin', just at dawn of day (2×)
Just at the settin' of the sun, that's when the work is done

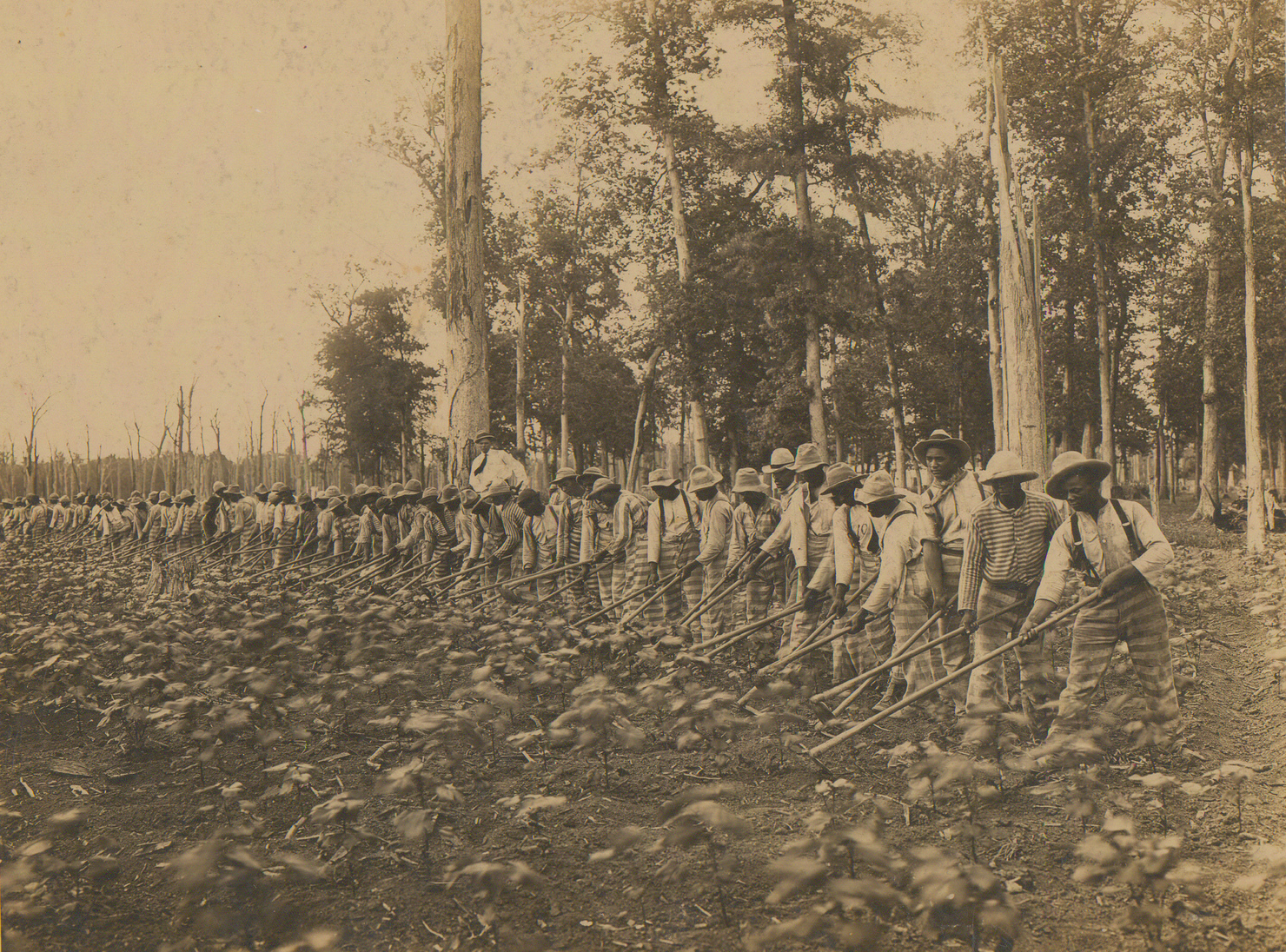
Parchman Farm chain gang in 1911

White never denied responsibility for the shooting, which he claimed was in self-defense: "I shot him where I wanted to shoot him. Broke this thigh". Although he usually downplayed his time at Parchman, the difference in his songs after his release is apparent. According to music historian Ted Gioia, "the rollicking, carefree ethos of 'The Panama Limited', of 'Shake 'Em On Down', is replaced by a darker, more introspective mood in his later recordings. A sense of pathos enters his music ... [and they] take on a more overtly artistic dimension".

When he last recorded commercially in 1937, rural-style blues was giving way to urban, ensemble blues styles. By 1940, performers, such as Louis Jordan with jump blues and T-Bone Walker with West Coast blues, were becoming popular and the electrified-Delta sound of Muddy Waters and John Lee Hooker was still a few years away. As Gioia notes, "It's not clear what audience Melrose had in mind when he agreed to record these songs". When "Parchman Farm Blues" was released as a single by Okeh Records in 1940, it went largely unnoticed. A brief review in the Amsterdam News in July 1940 referred to White's songs as "folk music" and not part of any current popular style. Subsequently, he only performed sporadically until his rediscovery during the American folk music revival in the early 1960s, when Bob Dylan and others began recording his songs, such as "Fixin' to Die Blues". "Parchman Farm Blues" is included on numerous Bukka White and various artists compilations.

== Mose Allison version ==
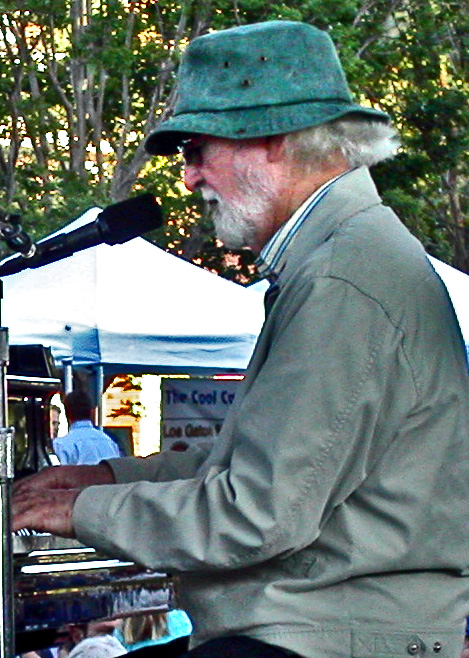
Mose Allison in 2007

In 1957, Mose Allison recorded "Parchman Farm" for his album Local Color. Although it is inspired by White's song, Allison uses a different arrangement and some new lyrics. In pondering his detention in the first verse, the singer claims "I ain't never done no man no harm"; however, by the last he admits "all I did was shoot my wife". The song is performed by a trio with Allison on vocal and piano, backed by Addison Farmer on bass and Nick Stabulas on drums. It is an uptempo song, which gains even greater momentum through modulation in the second verse.

"Parchman Farm" is one of Allison's best-known songs. In 1964, he re-recorded it with some new lyrics as "New Parchman" for The Word from Mose album. Heightening the irony, the first verse includes "Sittin' over here on Parchman Farm, the place is loaded with rustic charm". "Parchman Farm" since has been recorded by a variety of artists.
