= Nick Stabulas =

American musician

- Born: December 18, 1929; New York City, New York, U.S.
- Died: February 6, 1973 (aged 43); Great Neck, New York, U.S.
- Genres: Jazz
- Instrument: Drums
- Spouse: Katherine P Schroeder (died April 8, 1998)

Nicholas Stabulas (December 18, 1929 – February 6, 1973) was an American jazz drummer.

== Career ==
After working in commercial music, Stabulas was a member of Phil Woods group from 1954 to 1957. He did extensive work as a sideman in the 1950s, with Jon Eardley (1955–56), Jimmy Raney (1955–57), Eddie Costa (1956), Friedrich Gulda (1956), George Wallington (1956–57), Al Cohn (1956–57, 1960), Zoot Sims (1957), Gil Evans (1957), Mose Allison (1957–58), Carmen McRae (1958), and Don Elliott (1958). In the 1960s, he worked with Chet Baker, Kenny Drew, Bill Evans, Lee Konitz and Lennie Tristano. He remained active into the 1970s and died in a car crash in 1973.

== Discography ==
With Mose Allison

- Local Color (Prestige, 1957)
- Young Man Mose (Prestige, 1958)

With Al Cohn

- The Al Cohn Quintet Featuring Bobby Brookmeyer (Coral, 1956) with Bob Brookmeyer
- Al and Zoot (Coral, 1957) – with Zoot Sims

With Eddie Costa

- Eddie Costa/Vinnie Burke Trio (Josie, 1956)

With Gil Evans

- Gil Evans & Ten (Prestige, 1957)

With Friedrich Gulda

- Friedrich Gulda at Birdland (RCA Victor, 1957)
- A Man of Letters (Decca, 1957)

With Lee Konitz

- Motion (Verve, 1961)

With Carmen McRae

- Birds of a Feather (Decca, 1958)

With George Wallington

- Jazz at Hotchkiss (Savoy, 1957)

With Phil Woods

- Woodlore (Prestige, 1955)
- Phil and Quill with Prestige (Prestige, 1957)
- Sugan (Status, 1957) – with Red Garland
