= Mose Allison =

American pianist, singer, and songwriter (1927–2016)

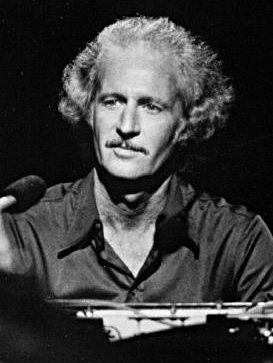
- Allison in 1975

Background information
- Born: Mose John Allison Jr. November 11, 1927; Tippo, Mississippi, U.S.
- Died: November 15, 2016 (aged 89) Hilton Head, South Carolina, U.S.
- Genres: Jazz; blues
- Instruments: Piano; vocals; trumpet
- Years active: 1956–2015
- Website: moseallison.com

Mose John Allison Jr. (November 11, 1927 – November 15, 2016) was an American jazz and blues pianist, singer, and songwriter. He became notable for playing a unique mix of blues and modern jazz, both singing and playing piano. After moving to New York in 1956, he worked primarily in jazz settings, playing with jazz musicians like Stan Getz, Al Cohn, and Zoot Sims, along with producing numerous recordings.

He is described as having been "one of the finest songwriters in 20th-century blues." His songs were strongly dependent on evoking moods, with his individualistic, "quirky", and subtle ironic humor. His writing influence on R&B had well-known fans recording his songs, among them Pete Townshend, who added his "Young Man Blues" into his band's touring repertoire, as captured on the Who's Live at Leeds album in 1970. John Mayall was one of dozens who recorded his classic, "Parchman Farm", and Georgie Fame used many of Allison's songs. Others who recorded his songs included Leon Russell ("I'm Smashed"), The Clash ("Look Here"), and Bonnie Raitt ("Everybody's Cryin' Mercy").

The 1980s saw an increase in his popularity with new fans drawn to his unique blend of modern jazz. In the 1990s he began recording more consistently. Van Morrison, Georgie Fame and Ben Sidran collaborated with him on a tribute album, Tell Me Something: The Songs of Mose Allison. The Pixies wrote the song "Allison" as a tribute.

Allison's music had an important influence on other artists, such as Jimi Hendrix, J. J. Cale, the Yardbirds, the Rolling Stones, Tom Waits, and Pete Townshend. He was inducted into the Long Island Music Hall of Fame in 2006.

== Early life ==
Allison was born in Tallahatchie County, Mississippi on his grandfather's farm (known as "the Island"), located outside the small unincorporated community of Tippo. The farm got the name, according to Allison, "because Tippo Bayou encircles it." He took piano lessons at 5, picked cotton, played piano in grammar school and trumpet in high school, and wrote his first song at 13.

Allison attended the University of Mississippi for a while and then enlisted in the U.S. Army for two years. Shortly after mustering out, he enrolled at Louisiana State University (LSU), from which he graduated in 1952 with a Bachelor of Arts degree in English with a minor in philosophy.

Allison received an Honorary Doctorate of Humane Letters from LSU in 2008.

== Career ==
In 1956, Allison moved to New York City and launched his jazz career, performing with artists such as Stan Getz, Gerry Mulligan, Al Cohn, Zoot Sims, and Phil Woods. His debut album, Back Country Suite, was issued by Prestige in 1957. He formed his own trio in 1958, with Addison Farmer on bass and Nick Stabulas on drums. In 1959, he released a single "The Seventh Son" on one side and "Do Nothing Till You Hear from Me" on the other side.

When Allison plays, his words strike you first. There's a subtlety to his lyrics, taking sly jabs at difficult women and Western culture with impeccable wit. His delivery and resonance come off with a coy matter-of-factness, while his no-frills, laid-back singing sets the mood for his jazz trio to lean back and enjoy the ride.

— Stratton Lawrence

It was not until 1963 that his record label allowed him to release an album entirely of vocals. Entitled Mose Allison Sings, it was a compilation of songs from his previous Prestige albums that paid tribute to artists, including Willie Dixon ("The Seventh Son", the first track the album), the Mojo Triangle: Sonny Boy Williamson ("Eyesight to the Blind"), and Jimmy Rogers ("That's All Right"). However, an original composition, with no connection other than the same title to "Bukka" White's 1940 "Parchman Farm", on the album brought him the most attention: "Parchman Farm". For more than two decades, "Parchman Farm" was his most requested song. He dropped it from his playlist in the 1980s partly because some critics felt it was politically incorrect, but also, he specified, because, "You go to the Mississippi Delta and there are no cotton sacks. It's all machines and chemicals."

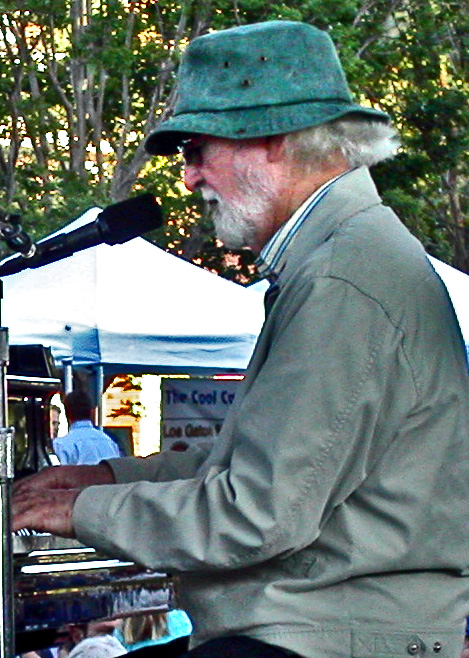
Allison in 2007

Prestige tried to market Allison as a pop star, but Columbia and later Atlantic tried to market him as a blues artist. Because he sang blues, Jet magazine thought that he was black and wanted to interview him.

His album The Way of the World, released in March 2010, was his first after a 12-year absence from the recording studio. In 2012, Allison was honored with a marker on the Mississippi Blues Trail in his hometown of Tippo. On January 14, 2013, he was named a Jazz Master by the National Endowment for the Arts, the nation's highest honor in jazz, in a ceremony at Lincoln Center in New York.

Allison wrote some 150 songs. His performances were described as being "delivered in a casual conversational way with a melodic southern accented tone that has a pitch and range ideally suited to his idiosyncratic phrasing, laconic approach and ironic sense of humour."

== Influence and legacy ==
A reporter interviewing Allison once stated he was "a social critic before Bob Dylan, satirical long before Randy Newman and rude before Mick Jagger." His music influenced many blues and rock artists, including Jimi Hendrix, the Rolling Stones, Tom Waits, the Yardbirds, John Mayall, J. J. Cale, the Who (who made "Young Man Blues" a staple of their live performances), and Georgie Fame, who described him as "more important than Bob Dylan". Blue Cheer recorded a version of his song "Parchman Farm" on their debut album, as did Cactus. The Yardbirds and the Misunderstood both recorded versions of his song "I'm Not Talking". Manfred Mann also recorded a version for the BBC. John Evans, keyboardist for the band Jethro Tull, was influenced by Allison's piano playing, which he described as "so deceptively simple and impressive."

Allison helped open the "blues' racial divide, proving that a white man from rural Mississippi could hold his own in a traditionally black genre." The effort proved difficult, which he described in the lyrics of "Ever Since I Stole the Blues", one of his most famous songs: "Well the blues police from down in Dixieland / Tried to catch me with the goods on hand / Ever since the white boy stole the blues."

His song "Look Here" was covered by the Clash on their album Sandinista!. Leon Russell covered Allison's song "Smashed!" on his album Stop All That Jazz. Allison performed with Van Morrison, Georgie Fame, and Ben Sidran on the album Tell Me Something: The Songs of Mose Allison. Elvis Costello recorded "Everybody's Cryin' Mercy" for his album Kojak Variety and "Your Mind Is on Vacation" for King of America (bonus tracks). Dani Klein, of the Belgian music act Vaya Con Dios, recorded "Mind on Vacation" for the album Roots and Wings, as did Canadian musician Colin James on his 1997 album National Steel.

Frank Black, of the band the Pixies, said that the song "Allison", from their album Bossanova, is about Mose Allison. The film The Whole Nine Yards begins with Allison's song "I Don't Worry About a Thing" during the opening credits. Americana singer-songwriter Greg Brown wrote and performed the song "Mose Allison Played Here" for his 1997 album Slant 6 Mind.

The Dutch musician Herman Brood recorded several of Allison's songs, including "Going to the City", "Stop This World", "Back on the Corner", and "Swinging Machine". Brood's band Wild Romance was named from the line "I lost my mind in a wild romance" after hearing Mose Allison's recording (Local Color album, 1957) of Percy Mayfield's 1951 song "Lost Mind".

Allison received 3 Grammy nominations: in 1983 and 1988 for Best Jazz Vocal Performance, Male, and in 2001 for Best Jazz Vocal Album.

In 2013, he was awarded the NEA Jazzmasters Award at Lincoln Center.

== Personal life and death ==
Mose married his wife, Audre, in 1949. They lived in Smithtown, New York, on Long Island, where they raised four children, including a daughter, Amy, who is a musician. Audre Allison said that when she first met Mose, "I could tell that he was someone who generated his own joy." She also said, "Mose has always paid attention to what is happening in the world, and has always read voraciously both past and present histories." Allison practiced Tai Chi.

Allison died November 15, 2016, four days after his 89th birthday, at his home in Hilton Head, South Carolina.

== Discography ==
=== As leader ===
Year recorded	Title	Label	Personnel/Notes
1957	Back Country Suite	Prestige	Trio, with Taylor LaFargue (bass), Frank Isola (drums)
1957	Local Color	Prestige	Trio, with Addison Farmer (bass), Nick Stabulas (drums)
1958	Young Man Mose	Prestige	Trio, with Addison Farmer (bass), Nick Stabulas (drums)
1958	Ramblin' with Mose	Prestige	Trio, with Addison Farmer (bass), Ronnie Free (drums)
1958	Creek Bank	Prestige	Trio, with Addison Farmer (bass), Ronnie Free (drums)
1959	Autumn Song	Prestige	Trio, with Addison Farmer (bass), Ronnie Free (drums)
1959–1960	Transfiguration of Hiram Brown	Columbia	Trio, with Addison Farmer (bass), Jerry Segal (drums)
1960	I Love the Life I Live	Columbia	Some tracks trio, with Addison Farmer (bass), Jerry Segal (drums); some tracks trio with Henry Grimes (bass), Paul Motian (drums); some tracks trio with Bill Crow (bass), Gus Johnson (drums)
1959–61	Takes to the Hills	Epic	Some tracks trio, with Aaron Bell (bass), Osie Johnson (drums); other tracks previously released on Transfiguration of Hiram Brown or I Love the Life I Live; also issued as V-8 Ford Blues by Epic in 1966
1962	I Don't Worry About a Thing	Atlantic	Trio, with Addison Farmer (bass), Osie Johnson (drums)
1962	Swingin' Machine	Atlantic	Quintet, with Jim Reider (tenor sax), Jimmy Knepper (trombone), Addison Farmer (bass), Frankie Dunlop (drums)
1963	Mose Allison Sings	Prestige	Compilation of vocal tracks from Allison's previous Prestige albums
1964	The Word from Mose	Atlantic	Trio, with Ben Tucker (bass), Don Lundberg (drums)
1965	Wild Man on the Loose	Atlantic	Trio, with Earl May (bass), Paul Motian (drums)
1965	Mose Alive!	Atlantic	Trio, with Stanley Gilbert (bass), Mel Lee (drums)
1968	I've Been Doin' Some Thinkin'	Atlantic	Trio, with Red Mitchell (bass), Bill Goodwin (drums)
1969–70	Hello There, Universe	Atlantic	With Jimmy Nottingham and Richard Williams (trumpet), Jerome Richardson (flute, alto sax), Joe Farrell and Joe Henderson tenor sax; separately), Pepper Adams and Seldon Powell (baritone sax; separately); Bob Cranshaw and John Williams (bass; separately), Joe Cocuzzo (drums)
1971	Western Man	Atlantic	Trio, with Chuck Rainey (electric bass), Billy Cobham (drums)
1972	Mose in Your Ear	Atlantic	Trio, with Clyde Flowers (bass), Eddie Charlton (drums); in concert
1976	Your Mind Is on Vacation	Atlantic	Some tracks trio, with Jack Hannah (bass) Jerry Granelli (drums); some tracks quartet, with Al Cohn (tenor sax) added; some tracks sextet, with Joe Farrell (tenor sax), David Sanborn (alto sax), Al Porcino (trumpet), Hannah (bass), Jerry Granelli (drums)
1978	Pure Mose	32 Jazz	Trio, with Tom Rutley (bass), Jerry Granelli (drums); in concert; released 1996
1982	Middle Class White Boy	Elektra/Musician	Sextet, with Joe Farrell (tenor sax, flute), Phil Upchurch (guitar), Putter Smith (bass), John Dentz (drums), Ron Powell (congas, percussion)
1982	Lessons in Living	Elektra/Musician	With Lou Donaldson (alto sax), Eric Gale (guitar), Jack Bruce (bass), Billy Cobham (drums); in concert
1987	Ever Since the World Ended	Blue Note	Some tracks trio, with Dennis Irwin (bass), Tom Whaley (drums); some tracks quartet, with Kenny Burrell (guitar) added; some tracks have Arthur Blythe (alto sax), Bob Malach (tenor sax, alto sax), Bennie Wallace (tenor sax) added in various combinations
1989	My Backyard	Blue Note	Quintet, with Tony Dagradi (tenor sax), Steve Masakowski (guitar), Bill Huntington (bass), John Vidacovich (drums)
1993	The Earth Wants You	Blue Note	With Ratzo Harris (bass), Ray Mantilla (congas), Paul Motian (drums), Randy Brecker (trumpet), Joe Lovano (alto sax), Bob Malach (tenor sax), Hugh McCracken (harmonica), John Scofield (guitar)
1996	Tell Me Something: The Songs of Mose Allison	Verve	With Van Morrison (vocals, harmonica), Georgie Fame (vocals, Hammond organ), Ben Sidran (vocals, piano), Alec Dankworth (bass), Ralph Salmins (drums), Guy Barker (trumpet), Pee Wee Ellis (tenor sax), Leo Green (tenor sax), Robin Aspland (Wurlitzer piano)
1997	Gimcracks and Gewgaws	Blue Note	With Mark Shim (tenor sax), Russell Malone (guitar), Ratzo Harris (bass), Paul Motian (drums)
2001	The Mose Chronicles: Live in London, Volume 1	Blue Note	Trio, with Roy Babbington (bass), Mark Taylor (drums); in concert
2002	The Mose Chronicles: Live in London, Volume 2	Blue Note	Quartet, with Jim Mullen (guitar), Roy Babbington (bass), Mark Taylor (drums); in concert
2006	American Legend – Live in California	Ibis	Trio, with Bill Douglass (bass), Pete Magadini (drums); in concert; released 2015
2010	The Way of the World	ANTI-	Most tracks with Jay Bellerose (drums, percussion), Greg Leisz (guitar, Weissenborn, mandola), David Piltch (bass), Walter Smith III (tenor sax), Anthony Wilson (guitar); one track with Amy Allison (vocals) added

=== Compilations ===
- 1963 : Mose Allison Sings (Prestige 7279), reissued as Seventh Son (Prestige 10052), 1973; released on CD as Greatest Hits (OJC 6004) in 1988; a "Rudy Van Gelder Remasters" edition (Concord 30011) was released with three additional tracks in 2006
- 1966 : Down Home Piano (Prestige 7423; CD reissue: OJC 922, 1997)
- 1967 : Mose Allison Plays for Lovers (Prestige 7446)
- 1970 : The Best of Mose Allison (Atlantic 1542), released on CD with eight additional tracks in 1988
- 1971 : Retrospective (Columbia C-30564)
- 1972 : Mose Allison (Prestige 24002), Sides A & B previously released in Prestige 7091 – "Back County Suite" Recorded 3/7/57, Sides C & D previously released in Prestige 7121 – "Local Color" Recorded 11/8/57
- 1994 : Allison Wonderland: The Mose Allison Anthology (Rhino R2-71689, two-CD set)
- 1994 : High Jinks! The Mose Allison Trilogy (Columbia/Epic/Legacy J3K-64275, three-CD set containing all the material from Columbia CS-8240, Columbia CS-8365, Epic BA-17031, plus six previously unreleased tracks)
- 1997 : Jazz Profile: Mose Allison (Blue Note 55230)
- 2010 : Mose Allison: The Collection (Floating World/Retro World FLOATM-6068, two-CD set)
- 2014 : The Mose Allison Collection 1956–1962 (Acrobat ACQCD-7078, four-CD set)
- 2015 : Seven Classic Albums (Real Gone Jazz RGJCD-472, four-CD set containing all the material from Back Country Suite, Local Color, Young Man Mose, Ramblin' With Mose, Creek Bank, Autumn Song [all Prestige], and I Love the Life I Live [Columbia])
- 2016 : I’m Not Talkin’: The Song Stylings of Mose Allison 1957–1972 (BGP/Beat Goes Public CDBGPD-304)
- 2021 : The Complete Atlantic/Elektra Albums 1962-1983 (Strawberry Music QCRJAMBOX 003, six-CD set includes 10 studio and 2 live albums)

=== As sideman ===
With Al Cohn

- The Al Cohn Quintet Featuring Bobby Brookmeyer, with Bob Brookmeyer (Coral CRL-57118, 1956)
- Al and Zoot: Al Cohn Quintet Featuring Zoot Sims, with Zoot Sims (Coral CRL-57171, 1957)
- Jazz Alive! A Night at the Half Note, with Zoot Sims, Phil Woods (United Artists UAL-4040/UAS-5040, 1959)
- Either Way, with Zoot Sims and Cecil "Kid Haffey" Collier (vocals on three of the eight tracks) (Fred Miles Presents FM-1, 1961; Zim ZMS-2002, 1976)

With Stan Getz

- The Soft Swing (Verve MGV-8321, 1957, released 1959)
