= Young Man Mose =

Studio album by Mose Allison
- Released: 1958
- Recorded: January 24, 1958
- Studio: Van Gelder Studio, Hackensack, New Jersey
- Genre: Blues, jazz
- Length: 38:32
- Label: Prestige; PRLP 7137
- Producer: Bob Weinstock

Mose Allison chronology
Local Color (1957)	Young Man Mose (1958)	Ramblin' with Mose (1958)

Young Man Mose is the third album by blues/jazz pianist and vocalist Mose Allison which was recorded in 1958 and released on the Prestige label.

== Reception ==
Professional ratings
Review scores
Source	Rating
Allmusic	3/5 stars

The Allmusic site awarded the album 3 stars.

== Track listing ==
1. "Somebody Else Is Taking My Place" (Bob Ellsworth, Richard Howard, Russ Morgan) – 4:03
2. "Don't Get Around Much Anymore" (Duke Ellington, Bob Russell) – 2:47
3. "Bye Bye Blues" (Fred Hamm, Dave Bennett, Bert Lown, Chauncey Gray) – 3:19
4. "How Long Has This Been Going On?" (George Gershwin, Ira Gershwin) – 4:07
5. "I Told Ya I Loved Ya, Now Get Out" (Lou Carter, Herb Ellis, Johnny Frigo) – 4:42
6. "Baby Let Me Hold Your Hand" (Ray Charles) – 3:15
7. "Stroll" – 3:55 (Mose Allison)
8. "I Hadn't Anyone Till You" (Ray Noble) – 2:31
9. "My Kinda Love" (Louis Alter, Jo Trent) – 3:50
10. "Sleepy Time Gal" (Joseph Reed Alden, Raymond B. Egan, Ange Lorenzo, Richard A. Whiting) – 5:23

== Personnel ==
- Mose Allison – piano, trumpet on 6 and 7, vocals
- Addison Farmer – bass
- Nick Stabulas – drums
