= Hello There, Universe =

Studio album by Mose Allison
- Released: 1970
- Recorded: October 16 & 21, 1969 and January 22 & 29, 1970
- Studio: Regent Sound Studio, New York City
- Genre: Jazz
- Length: 36:22
- Label: Atlantic
- Producer: Joel Dorn

Mose Allison chronology
| I've Been Doin' Some Thinkin' (1968) | Hello There, Universe (1970) | Western Man (1971) |

Hello There, Universe is an album by American pianist, vocalist and composer Mose Allison released on the Atlantic label in 1970.

== Reception ==
Professional ratings
Review scores
| Source | Rating |
|---|---|
| AllMusic | 3/5 stars |

Allmusic awarded the album 3 stars with its review by Scott Yanow calling it "a gap-filler rather than an essential recording".

== Track listing ==
All compositions by Mose Allison except as indicated

1. "Somebody Gotta Move" – 2:13
2. "Monsters of the Id" – 4:53
3. "I Don't Want Much" – 2:37
4. "Hello There, Universe" – 3:48
5. "No Exit" – 3:39
6. "Wild Man on the Loose" – 2:24
7. "Blues in the Night" (Harold Arlen, Johnny Mercer) – 4:52
8. "I'm Smashed" – 2:53
9. "Hymn to Everything" – 6:17
10. "On the Run" – 2:17

== Personnel ==
- Mose Allison – piano, organ, vocals
- Jimmy Nottingham, Richard Williams – trumpet
- Jerome Richardson – flute, alto saxophone
- Joe Farrell (tracks 1, 3–7, 9 & 10), Joe Henderson (tracks 2 & 8) – tenor saxophone
- Pepper Adams (tracks 1, 2, 8 & 9) Seldon Powell (tracks 3–7 & 10) – baritone saxophone
- Bob Cranshaw (tracks 2 & 8), John Williams (tracks 1, 3–7, 9 & 10) – bass
- Joe Cocuzzo – drums
