= Transfiguration of Hiram Brown =

Studio album by Mose Allison
- Released: 1960
- Recorded: December 21, 1959 – January 11, 1960; New York
- Genre: Blues / Jazz
- Length: 40:57
- Label: Columbia Records

Mose Allison chronology
Autumn Song (1959)	Transfiguration of Hiram Brown (1960)	I Love the Life I Live (1960)

Transfiguration of Hiram Brown is a studio album by Mose Allison released in 1960 under the Columbia Records label (Columbia CL1444). The album includes nine tracks written by Allison and five covers, all sung by Allison, with Addison Farmer on bass and Jerry Segal on drums.

== Background ==
From the liner notes by Teo Macero:

According to Mose Allison, "Transfiguration of Hiram Brown Suite" is a serio-comic fantasy based on a perennial theme. Hiram Brown is the naive provincial who dreams of a life of opulence in the city. He goes there, is overwhelmed and disillusioned, longs for his youth, realizes that this too is an illusion, despairs, goes through a crisis and is "transfigured...."
Some of the material contained here was written many years ago, and some written especially for this album. (The opening theme, for instance, was written ten to fifteen years ago.) The Suite is a fusion of different elements. The first three parts are the country; the middle section the city; the last part, the denouement....

Per Allmusic.com: "The album begins with the eight-part "Hiram Brown" suite, in which a naïve country boy loses his illusions and optimism in the big city. Five standards complete the album in fine style. "Baby Please Don't Go" and "'Deed I Do" offer Mose's unique, smoky singing at its most touching."

== Track listing ==
All compositions by Mose Allison except as indicated.

1. "Barefoot-Dirt Road" – 3:16
2. "City Home" – 2:29
3. "Cuttin' Out" – 1:38
4. "Gotham Day" – 3:21
5. "Gotham Night" – 4:26
6. "Echo" – 0:59
7. "The River" – 4:07
8. "Finale" – 0:46
9. "Barefoot-Dirt Road" – 3:18 (alternate take on CD reissue)
10. "How Little We Know" (Johnny Mercer, Hoagy Carmichael) – 3:49
11. "Baby, Please Don't Go" (Big Joe Williams) – 2:32
12. "Make Yourself Comfortable" (Bob Merrill) – 4:12
13. "'Deed I Do" (Walter Hirsch, Fred Rose) – 2:32
14. "Love for Sale" (Cole Porter) – 5:02

== Personnel ==
- Mose Allison – piano, vocals
- Addison Farmer – bass
- Jerry Segal – drums
