= I Love the Life I Live =

Studio album by Mose Allison
- Released: 1960
- Recorded: June 28 – September 9, 1960
- Genre: Blues / Jazz
- Length: 44:41
- Label: Columbia
- Producer: Teo Macero

Mose Allison chronology
Transfiguration of Hiram Brown (1959)	I Love the Life I Live (1960)	Takes to the Hills (1961)

I Love the Life I Live is an album by the American musician Mose Allison, released in 1960.

Allison became notable for playing a unique mix of blues and modern jazz, both singing and playing piano. After moving to New York in 1956, he worked primarily in jazz settings, playing with jazz musicians like Stan Getz, Al Cohn, and Zoot Sims, along with producing numerous recordings.

It was produced by Teo Macero.

== Reception ==
AllMusic rated the album four and a half stars.

== Track listing ==
All compositions by Mose Allison except as indicated

No.	Title	Length
1.	"I Love the Life I Live"	2:22
2.	"News"	3:11
3.	"Fool's Paradise"	3:29
4.	"You Turned the Tables on Me"	3:51
5.	"Isobel"	4:26
6.	"You're a Sweetheart"	2:11
7.	"Night Ride"	3:12
8.	"Path"	3:33
9.	"Mad with You"	2:10
10.	"Hittin' on One"	3:30
11.	"I Ain't Got Nobody"	1:51
12.	"Can't We Be Friends"	4:25
13.	"A Pretty Girl Is Like a Melody" (bonus track on CD)	3:18
14.	"Am I Blue" (bonus track on CD)	3:24
Total length:		49:53

== Personnel ==
On tracks 3, 4, 7, 8, and 9 (recorded June 28 and July 5, 1960):

- Mose Allison – piano, vocals
- Addison Farmer – bass
- Jerry Segal – drums

On tracks 1, 2, 6, and 10 (recorded June 30, 1960):

- Mose Allison – piano, vocals
- Henry Grimes – bass
- Paul Motian – drums

On tracks 5, 11, and 12 (recorded September 9, 1960):

- Mose Allison – piano, vocals
- Bill Crow – bass
- Gus Johnson – drums
