= I've Been Doin' Some Thinkin' =

Studio album by Mose Allison
- Released: 1968
- Recorded: July 9, 10 & 12, 1968
- Studio: Annex Recording Studios, Hollywood
- Genre: Jazz
- Length: 29:01
- Label: Atlantic
- Producer: Mose Allison

Mose Allison chronology
Mose Alive! (1965)	I've Been Doin' Some Thinkin' (1968)	Hello There, Universe (1970)

I've Been Doin' Some Thinkin' is an album by American pianist, vocalist and composer Mose Allison recorded for the Atlantic label in 1968.

== Reception ==
Professional ratings
Review scores
Source	Rating
AllMusic	4/5 stars
The Penguin Guide to Jazz	3/4 stars

Allmusic awarded the album 4 stars with its review by Eugene Chadbourne stating, "Three years had gone by between this release and the previous Mose Allison outing on Atlantic, perhaps giving the artist time to concoct some of the really tasty lyrics he came up with". The Penguin Guide to Jazz wrote that the album "is Allison's darkest and most world-aware record".

== Track listing ==
All compositions by Mose Allison except as indicated

1. "Just Like Livin'" – 1:44
2. "City Home" – 3:37
3. "If You're Goin' to the City" – 2:48
4. "Now You See It" – 2:27
5. "You Are My Sunshine" (Jimmie Davis, Charles Mitchell) – 2:07
6. "Your Molecular Structure" – 2:05
7. "Look What You Made Me Do" – 2:31
8. "If You Really Loved Me" – 2:13
9. "Everybody Cryin' Mercy" – 2:39
10. "Feel So Good" – 2:49
11. "Let It Come Down" – 1:56
12. "Back on the Corner" – 2:05

== Personnel ==
- Mose Allison – piano, vocals
- Red Mitchell – bass
- Bill Goodwin – drums
