= The Word from Mose =

Studio album by Mose Allison
- Released: March 10, 1964
- Recorded: 1964
- Genre: Jazz
- Label: Atlantic
- Producer: Nesuhi Ertegun

Mose Allison chronology
Swingin' Machine (1963)	The Word from Mose (1964)	Wild Man on the Loose (1965)

The Word from Mose is a 1964 jazz album by the jazz pianist and singer Mose Allison. The album, described by Allmusic as "light, swinging jazz with a distinctly rural, Southern influence", has been listed as one of the "core collection" albums for jazz fans by the Penguin Guide to Jazz. Originally released on Atlantic Records 1424, the album was released on CD by WEA International in 2000 and subsequently by Rhino in 2001 and 2005.

== Critical reception ==
Professional ratings
Review scores
Source	Rating
The Penguin Guide to Jazz Recordings	4/4 stars

At the time of its release, Stereo Review dubbed it "one of Mose's best recordings", praising it as "one of his most consistently intriguing albums". Much later, Allmusic reviewer Eugene Chadborne noted that some of the songs do not rise to the level of quality of others, but overall praised Allison's reworking "material from the real country blues heritage...into his own style, to brilliant effect", calling out specifically the track "New Parchman" as "a performance that only the most hardened individual would be able to listen to without a smile cracking their face". The Penguin Guide to Jazz includes the album as part of its recommended "core collection" for fans of jazz music.

== Track listing ==
Unless otherwise specified, all songs composed by Mose Allison

1. "Foolkiller" – 2:25
2. "One of These Days" – 3:02
3. "Look Here" – 2:12
4. "Days Like This" – 2:51
5. "Your Red Wagon" (DePaul, Jones, Raye) – 2:14
6. "Wild Man" (Everett Barksdale, Stanley Willis) – 1:58
7. "Rollin' Stone" (Muddy Waters) – 2:58
8. "New Parchman" – 3:04
9. "Don't Forget to Smile" – 2:48
10. "I'm Not Talkin'" – 2:30
11. "Lost Mind" (Percy Mayfield) – 4:08

== Personnel ==
- Mose Allison — piano, vocals
- Nesuhi Ertegun — supervisor
- Lee Friedlander — cover photo
- Phil Iehle — engineer
- Roy Lundberg — drums
- Ben Tucker — bass
